= Easy Star Records =

American independent record label

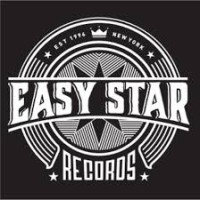
- Parent company: Independent
- Founded: 1996; 30 years ago
- Founder: Michael Goldwasser; Eric Smith; Lem Oppenheimer; Remy Gerstein
- Genre: Reggae, rocksteady, dub, dancehall, ska
- Country of origin: United States
- Location: New York, NY
- Official website: easystar.com

Easy Star Records is an American independent record label founded in 1996. Based in New York City, the label primarily produces and releases albums in the genres of reggae and dub.

The label has had multiple albums chart at No. 1 on the Billboard Top Reggae Albums chart, including Easy Star's Lonely Hearts Dub Band, two albums by The Green, and Vines by Passafire, who signed to the label in 2013. In 2014, the label released albums by Rebelution, Giant Panda Guerilla Dub Squad, Backbeat Soundsystem, New Kingston, and The Expanders, whose June 2015 album Hustling Culture debuted at No. 1 on the Top Reggae Albums chart. Since 2015, the label has released albums by London-based quartet The Skints, Jamaican vocalists Jesse Royal and Protoje, among others. Falling Into Place by Rebelution and A Matter Of Time by Protoje, released via Easy Star Records, each received Grammy Award nominations for Best Reggae Album in 2016 and 2018 respectively. Easy Star Records earned two Grammy nominations in the same year for the first time in 2026 with From Within by Mortimer and No Place Like Home by Jesse Royal. This was Jesse Royal's 2nd Grammy nomination with Easy Star Records after 2022's ROYAL. The label also manages bands such as the Easy Star All-Stars, a touring and recording musical collective, and has worked with artists outside the reggae genre such as Citizen Cope, Corey Harris, Janelle Monáe, Jason Mraz, Kelly Clarkson, Yoko Ono , and Macy Gray.

The Easy Star All Stars joined Geese on their 2026 "Getting Killed Again" North American Tour. Specifically, the Easy Star All Stars opened for Geese's Salt Lake City, UT, Denver, CO, Kansas City, MO, and Chicago, IL, shows, Oct 27th-31st.

== History ==
Easy Star Records was founded in 1996 by friends Michael Goldwasser, Eric Smith, Lem Oppenheimer and Remy Gerstein, in New York City.

Despite coming from various backgrounds and interests, the founders shared a love for live dancehall and Jamaican reggae.

As depicted by United Reggae, the founders "felt there was a place for roots reggae made with live musicians and analog equipment, like it had been back in the 70’s and early 80’s". The inspiration for the label's name came from the "Jamaican patois salutation, ‘Easy, Star,’ as in 'Take it easy, Star.'"

At the time, Goldwasser was working as a musician, while Oppenheimer, a DJ, had recently moved to New York after graduating from Oberlin College in Ohio. Eric Smith, a native New Yorker, studied political science and sociology at SUNY Albany, while maintaining his interest in live reggae and vinyl. He was also working as a news assistant on The New York Times’ Metro desk.

Without any previous experience; Eric, Lem, Michael, and Remy gathered most of their savings -equating to about $5,000 per person, to start Easy Star Records. Eric states, "We had to start from scratch, but we methodically learned everything we could. We focused on the challenges at hand, rather than becoming overwhelmed by the scope of starting a business.”

In 1997 Lem Oppenheimer moved to Charlottesville, Virginia, but stayed connected with the label, serving as an executive from a distance.

== Founding Easy Star All-Stars ==
Michael Goldwasser, already a musician in the New York City reggae scene, brought together a number of musicians to work on original music that he had been working on. Goldwasser stated, "We wanted to be an original Jamaican reggae label, although not run by Jamaicans."

The label shortly started working with artists and producers with unreleased material mostly from the 1970s and 1980s and began reissuing tracks as well. The New York reggae and dub collective, Easy Star All-Stars, was then formed by the label co-founders in 1997. With a rotating roster of musicians, the band originally functioned as a studio band for the label's earliest recordings, however only beginning to tour in 2003. Early on, the Easy Star All-Stars would play around New York City backing up Jamaican artists, including Sugar Minott and Johnny Osbourne. The band also put on tribute shows to artists such as Augustus Pablo, Dennis Brown, and Jackie Mittoo. To note, not all of the co-founders were musically involved in the band; Oppenheimer, for example, remained VP of the label and not a touring member. Michael Goldwasser serves as the group's original composer and "unofficial creative director," playing various instruments on their releases and writing the adaptations before the band goes on tour.

== 1997–2002: Easy Star Records' Early releases ==
Easy Star Records released several singles on 7" vinyl, including "Time Has Come," the first single by Ossie Dellimore, in 1997. Dellimore, a roots reggae singer based in Brooklyn, performed locally for several years before recording with the Easy Star All-Stars.

After 1997, the label ceased releasing singles, instead focusing on EPs and LPs. In January 1998, Easy Star Records released its first compilation, Easy Star Volume One, which included covers by the Easy Star All-Stars and guest performers such as MC Trouble, Rob Symeonn, Gary Pine, Sister Carol, Sluggy Ranks, Ranking Joe, The Meditations, and Sugar Minott.

Among the songs were Dellimore's previous single, "Time Has Come," and other singles the label already released on 7".

AllMusic called the album an "exceptionally good collection of reggae singles...Although all of the tracks benefit from state-of-the-art production technology, the singing and playing are all reminiscent of the late '70s and early '80s, the period when Rastafarian-themed roots reggae was ceding ground to the slicker and more secular dancehall styles." Also giving it 4/5 stars with a positive review.

Regarding the album's production, "The prime mover behind this album is producer Michael G, who provides all the rhythms and a virtuosic touch at the mixing board."

== 1999–2002 ==
On February 9, 1999, Easy Star Records came out with Ghetto Knowledge by The Meditations, a reggae vocal harmony group from Jamaica and the second release on the label. AllMusic describes Ghetto Knowledge as "a match made in heaven: the Meditations, a roots harmony trio that has maintained the same style and lineup since the early 1970s, and Easy Star Records, a label devoted to releasing modern roots reggae that partakes of the spirit and flavor of reggae's classical period while taking advantage of 21st century recording technology."

Almost nine months later, the label released Sugar Minott's compilation album, Hidden Treasures Vol. 1.

In 2000, the label started releasing 7" vinyl again, with over ten singles alone in that year by artists including singer Luciano, Jamaican deejays Anthony B and Triston Palma, and The Meditations. The label also released three full-length albums that year, with the first being the March reissue of Ghetto-ology, a 1979 album by singer and producer Sugar Minott. In October of that year, the label released Sugar Minott's compilation, Hidden Treasures Vol. 2, followed in November by Jamaican deejay Tristan Palma's album, Two Roads.

In February 2001, the label saw the release of All I Have Is Love; a compilation album and the label's seventh release. The original album included artist record remakes of classic Studio One songs produced by Sister Carol. It was received positively by critics such as Stephen Cook of AllMusic, who called it "successful look back at the music before the digital hegemony of dancehall and ragga."

In August 2001, Sugar Minott released Rare Gems, his second release on Easy Star Records. Want Some Freedom by The African Brothers was then released in September 2001, with only two albums released in 2002: Easy Star Vol. 2 Dancehall Culture, and the compilation album Can't Stop Us Now.

== 2003: Dub Side of the Moon ==
Several years after Can't Stop Us Now, the label released one album annually. On February 18, 2003, the Easy Star All-Stars released Dub Side of the Moon, a reggae reinterpretation of Pink Floyd's classic The Dark Side of the Moon. Dollarman, Corey Harris, Frankie Paul, The Meditations, and Ranking Joe were among the performers. The Easy Star All-Stars "hit the ground running in 2003 with the Pink Floyd tribute Dub Side Of The Moon, [and] ...followed that up with regular three-year installments: first came Radiodread, a spacious tip of the hat to Radiohead's OK Computer, before Easy Star's Lonely Hearts Dub Band and Easy Star's Thrillah – a Jamaican-infused take on Michael Jackson's world sales-record album. AllMusic gave Dub Side of the Moon a positive review, stating "dub's psychedelic mysticism is a perfectly good match for Pink Floyd's mannered weirdness." Dub Side of the Moon stayed on the Billboard Reggae Chart for several years after its release in 2003. After its release. there was "a great demand for live renditions of the album all over the world," and the label put together a touring group which has been on the road since 2003. The Easy Star All-Stars were also coined as the trendsetter for cover albums taking off; the Independent states, "The concept only began to take off in the early Noughties, thanks partly to the genius of New York-based reggae outfit The Easy Star All Stars, who have recorded some of the most accomplished and inspired cover albums." Despite the frequent pop song covers, Easy Star co-founder and executive producer Eric Smith has stated "There is a lot of suffering and pain in reggae. It's a struggler's, it's a sufferer's music. The casual fan sees reggae as a summer, spring-break-type music, and that's really far from what it's about. We like some of the darker areas of reggae, and one of our concerns with combining [reggae and Dark Side of the Moon], was we'd have a really, really dark album on our hands."

== 2005–2008: EPs ==
The label had no releases in 2003 or 2004. The label's next release was in April 2005, the album Pressure Points by American reggae band, John Brown's Body. In August 2006, Easy Star All-Stars released their song-by-song cover of Radiohead's OK Computer named Radiodread. Thom Yorke praised Toots & The Maytals version of "Let Down" on Radiodread, and Radiohead guitarist, Jonny Greenwood, also praised the cover version, calling it "truly astounding." Easy Star All-Stars member, Ticklah, released a solo album, Ticklah vs. Axelrod in late 2007. Unlike their previous albums, this album consists of mostly non-cover material, except for "Dubbing Up the Walls," a cover of the Radiohead song "Climbing Up the Walls."

== Marketing and events ==
The label previously organized Easy Star Reggae Tuesdays, a long-running reggae party in New York. The label has consulted on marketing for albums such as Mighty High (2007) by Southern jam band Gov't Mule.[1] The label has also been involved in consulting with SOJA, a Virginia reggae band signed to ATO Records.

== 2009: Tours and charting albums ==
The label released five albums in 2009; John Brown's Body, Amplify, debuted at #1 on Billboard's reggae charts. The band's remix EP Re-Amplify also debuted on the Reggae Albums chart, peaking at #8. This album featured remixes by artists from around the world including; Dubmatix (Toronto), WrongTom (London) and Disashi Lumumba Kasongo from Gym Class Heroes (US). Easy Star All-Stars released Easy Star's Lonely Hearts Dub Band, a reggae cover of The Beatles' Sgt. Pepper's Lonely Hearts Club Band. Music Feeds rated the album 10/10, it made the Billboard Top 200 twice and the first reggae album to do so in over two years. It also reached #1 on Top Reggae Albums, #2 on Top Heatseekers, and #9 on the Top Independent Albums.

Later in 2009, the label also reissued the 2008 album Solid Ground, its first album by New Zealand reggae band, The Black Seeds. This album was the band's first US release and also reached platinum status in New Zealand, and #15 on the US Billboard Reggae Chart. The Black Seeds toured America supporting John Brown's Body, before John Brown's Body came to New Zealand to tour with The Black Seeds.

This tour lead to a musical brotherhood with The Black Seeds and they and John Brown's Body performed together at the 2010 Grassroots Music Festival in Ithaca, NY. The label also released The Prester John Sessions, a solo album by Tommy T, the Ethiopian bassist for the band Gogol Bordello.

== 2010–2013 ==
Easy Star Records released three records in late 2010, including Connection by American vocalist Cas Haley that debuted at #2 on Billboard's Top 200 Best Selling Reggae Albums. a second album by The Black Seeds, and the remix album, Dubber Side of the Moon by Easy Star All-Stars that debuted at #2 on the Billboard Reggae Chart. 2011 marked the first time in almost a decade that the label released a 7" vinyl single: "Pork Eater" by Ticklah, a 2007 track that first appeared on his album Ticklah vs. Axelrod. "Pork Eater" was followed by the single "Don't Stop the Music" by the Easy Star All-Stars. In 2011, the label also released the first original album by the Easy Star All-Stars: First Light. Cas Haley also released another EP. This year, the label signed The Green, a reggae band formed in 2009 in Oahu, Hawaii known for blending Hawaiian music with roots reggae. The band released an LP and EP that year and in May 2011 the LP Ways & Means spent four weeks at #1 on Billboard's Reggae Chart, also winning "Best Reggae Album" at Hawaii's Na Hoku Hanohano Awards In April, 2012 The Black Seeds, a New Zealand-based reggae band, released their albums in the United States for the first time. The new LP Dust and Dirt and four older albums including Into The Dojo were among them. In 2012, the Easy Star All-Stars, released cover album Easy Star's Thrillah, themed to Michael Jackson, and the album JBB in DUB by America Reggae band, John Brown's Body.

== 2013–2015 ==
John Brown's Body released Kings & Queens in early 2013, followed by Cas Haley's La Si Dah and The Green's Hawai'i '13. Easy Star Records also signed Passafire, from Savannah, Georgia, known for infusing rock with reggae, dub, and progressive elements in their music. Their album, Vines, was released that fall, also marking the label's 40th release. Kings and Queens, Hawai'i '13, and Vines, all reached #1 on the Billboard Top Reggae Albums chart that year. Count Me In by Rebelution, was released on June 10, 2014,[3] debuting at #14 on the Billboard 200. Easy Star All-Stars released Dub Side of the Moon: Special Anniversary Edition on September 16, 2014. The band Giant Panda Guerilla Dub Squad released Steady on September 30, 2014, with the album receiving a near perfect 4.5/5 score from The Pier. Backbeat Soundsystem released the album Together Not Apart on October 14, 2014. In November 2014, the New York band New Kingston signed to the label to release their album Kingston City, which came out on January 27, 2015. The Expanders' June 2015 album Hustling Culture on Easy Star debuted at #1 on the Top Reggae Albums chart.

== 2016-2019 ==
In summer 2016, Rebelution released Falling Into Place, their second full-length album via Easy Star Records. Falling Into Place, Rebelution's 6th studio album, debuted at #1 on Billboard's Top Reggae Albums chart, #3 on Billboard's Top Independent Albums chart, and #32 on the Billboard 200. Later that year Easy Star Records put out Live at Red Rocks by Rebelution, which also debuted #1 on Billboard's Top Reggae Albums chart. In September 2016, John Brown's Body released Fireflies, the band's 12th studio album and 7th with Easy Star Records. Fireflies also achieved the #1 spot on Billboard's Top Reggae Albums chart. In 2016, Easy Star Records also released Backbeat Soundystem's Into The Light EP, and The Big Smoke Remixed by Gentleman's Dub Club.

In 2017, Easy Star Records released 9 albums. Lily of da Valley by Jesse Royal, Old Time Something Come Back Again, Vol. 2 by The Expanders, and Marching Orders by The Green each reached the #1 spot on Billboard's Top Reggae Albums chart. Other Easy Star Records releases in 2017 included Dubtopia by Gentleman's Dub Club, Longshot by Passafire, Sharp & Ready by Double Tiger, A Kingston Story: Come from Far by New Kingston, Fabric by The Black Seeds, and Victor Rice's Smoke.

In 2018, Easy Star Records released Free Rein by Rebelution and A Matter Of Time by Protoje, both of which reached #1 on the Billboard's Top Reggae Albums Chart. Protoje's A Matter Of Time also received a Grammy nomination for Best Reggae Album. In 2019, Easy Star Records released new albums from Gentleman's Dub Club, The Green, The Skints, Spragga Benz, Bedouin Soundclash. In tandem with Winta James' Overstand Entertainment, the label also released Fight The Fight, the debut EP from Mortimer.

== 2020 ==
Easy Star released albums from Rebelution, Unified Highway, Victor Rice, The Skints, and Double Tiger in 2020. The label also introduced the debut album, Underrated, from Jamaican trap and "grimehall" artist Fyah Roiall. Additionally, Easy Star released the Lately EP from Hawaii-bred, California-based trio The Late Ones, and Star Chile EP with tracks featuring Lutan Fyah, Pressure Busspipe, and Alandon over a riddim produced by Digital Ancient. On March 13, 2020, Easy Star released the hit single "Natty Pablo" by Jesse Royal, and a corresponding music video on April 10, 2020. The label also released several other singles from artists such as The Expanders, The Steppas, Backbeat Soundsystem, Indubious, Bedouin Soundclash, Gentleman's Dub Club, The Skints, The Black Seeds and Fyah Roiall.

== 2021-2023 ==
Between 2021 and 2023, Easy Star has released albums from Gentleman's Dub Club, Indubious, Rebelution, The Late Ones, Marcus Gad and Tamal, Groundation, JonQuan and Associates, Kirsty Rock, The Black Seeds, and Sundub. In 2021, the label released an album from Jesse Royal, titled Royal, which was nominated for a Grammy. In 2023, Easy Star Records' "Starman" cover with Maxi Priest, a reggae interpretation of the popular David Bowie tune, earned an article and feature in Rolling Stone magazine. The subsequent album, "Ziggy Stardub," featuring another 14 Bowie interpretations, also earned an article with Billboard magazine. Easy Star's late 2023 release from Samory I, "Strength," received an album review from Rolling Stone before it was picked as one of Rolling Stone's Best Albums of 2023, placed at #42. The label also released a number of singles under its various artists.

== 2024-2026 ==
From 2024 to 2026, Easy Star released albums from artists including, but not limited to, Mortimer, SunDub, Royal Blu, Naomi Cowan, Jesse Royal, Runkus, and Flying Vipers. Off World, by Flying Vipers, featured the first ever cassette release in the entirety of the Easy Star Records catalog. Royal Blu released his highly anticipated debut album titled Spain Root, which details Blu's upbringing in Jamaica's historic Spanish Town. Additionally, Naomi Cowan also came out with her debut album, Welcome to Paradise, with Easy Star Records. The album explores themes such as love, loss, and lust, and features the legendary executive producer, Toddla T. Runkus experimented with avant garde art in collaboration with Bahamian artist Tavares Strachan with his album Supernova. Jesse Royal released both the original version of his album No Place Like Home in 2025, and followed up with the deluxe version in 2026 including an expanded dub track list.

== Discography ==
Albums

List of Easy Star Records albums

Year	Cat. #	Release date	Title	Artist(s)	Format	Certifications / Notes
1998	ES-1001	01/01/98	Easy Star Volume One	Various / Easy Star All-Stars	CD	
1999	ES-1002	02/09/99	Ghetto Knowledge	The Meditations	CD	
1999	ES-1003	Oct/99	Hidden Treasures Vol. 1	Various	LP, CD	
2000	ES-1004	Mar/00	Ghetto-ology	Sugar Minott	CD	Re-issue
2000	ES-1005	Oct/00	Hidden Treasures Vol. 2	Various	LP, CD	
2000	ES-1006	Nov/00	Two Roads	Triston Palma	CD	
2001	ES-1007	Feb/01	All I Have Is Love	Various	LP, CD	
2001	ES-1008	Aug/01	Rare Gems	Sugar Minott	CD	
2001	ES-1009	Sep/01	Want Some Freedom	The African Brothers	LP, CD	
2002	ES-1010	01/01/02	Easy Star Vol. 2 Dancehall Culture	Various / Easy Star All-Stars	LP, CD	
2002	ES-1011	07/16/02	Can't Stop Us Now: Linval Thompson Productions	Various	LP, CD	
2003	ES-1012	02/18/03	Dub Side of the Moon	Easy Star All-Stars	LP, CD	#5 Top Reggae Albums
2005	ES-1013	04/26/05	Pressure Points	John Brown's Body	CD	#11 Top Reggae Albums
2006	ES-1014	08/22/06	Radiodread	Easy Star All-Stars	LP, CD, Digital	#5 Top Reggae Albums #43 Top Independent Albums #44 Top Heatseekers
2007	ES-1015	09/18/07	Ticklah vs. Axelrod	Ticklah	CD	
2008	ES-1016	03/25/08	Until that Day EP	Easy Star All-Stars	EP vinyl, CD	
2009	ES-1017	03/17/09	Amplify	John Brown's Body	CD	#1 Top Reggae Albums
2009	ES-1018	04/14/09	Easy Star's Lonely Hearts Dub Band	Easy Star All-Stars	LP, CD	#1 Top Reggae Albums #2 Top Heatseekers #9 Top Independent Albums #117 Billboard 200
2009	ES-1019	03/17/09	Re-Amplify	John Brown's Body	CD	#8 Top Reggae Albums
2009	ES-1020	09/15/09	Solid Ground	The Black Seeds	LP, CD	#15 Top Reggae Albums
2009	ES-1021	11/10/09	The Prester John Sessions	Tommy T	CD	
2010	ES-1022	09/14/10	Connection	Cas Haley	CD	#2 Top Reggae Albums
2010	ES-1023	10/25/10	Dubber Side of the Moon	Easy Star All-Stars	LP, CD	#2 Top Reggae Albums
2010	ES-1024	11/02/10	Specials	The Black Seeds	Digital only	
2011	ES-1025	04/25/11	First Light	Easy Star All-Stars	LP, CD	#4 Top Reggae Albums
2011	ES-1026	10/24/11	Ways & Means	The Green	LP, CD	#1 Top Reggae Albums #6 Top Heatseekers Best Reggae Album at 2011 Na Hoku Hanohano Awards
2011	ES-1027	08/09/11	Love & Affection EP	The Green	LP, CD	#2 Top Reggae Albums #17 Top Heatseekers
2011	ES-1028	11/08/11	Gifts to Give EP	Cas Haley	LP, CD	
2012	ES-1029	04/10/12	Dust and Dirt	The Black Seeds	LP, CD	#3 Top Reggae Albums ('12/'13)
2012	ES-1030	04/10/12	On The Sun	The Black Seeds	CD	Re-issue (US)
2012	ES-1031	04/10/12	Into the Dojo	The Black Seeds	CD	Re-issue (US)
2012	ES-1032	04/10/12	Keep On Pushing	The Black Seeds	CD	Re-issue (US)
2012	ES-1033	04/10/12	The Black Seeds Live: Vol 1	The Black Seeds	CD	Re-issue (US)
2012	ES-1034	08/28/12	Easy Star's Thrillah	Easy Star All-Stars	LP, CD	#1 Top Reggae Albums
2012	ES-1035	07/10/12	Billie Jean (EP)	Easy Star All-Stars	Digital only	
2012	ES-1036	09/18/12	JBB in DUB	John Brown's Body	Digital only	
2013	ES-1037	04/16/13	Kings & Queens	John Brown's Body	LP, CD	#1 Top Reggae Albums #23 Top Heatseekers
2013	ES-1038	05/28/13	La Si Dah	Cas Haley	CD	
2013	ES-1039	08/20/13	Hawai'i '13	The Green	LP, CD	#1 Top Reggae Albums ('13/'14) #18 Top Independent Albums #77 Billboard 200
2013	ES-1040	11/11/13	Vines	Passafire	CD	#1 Top Reggae Albums
2014	ES-1041	06/13/14	Count Me In	Rebelution	LP, CD	#1 Top Reggae Albums #2 Top Independent Albums #4 Digital Albums #14 Billboard 200
2014	ES-1042	09/16/14	Dub Side of the Moon: Special Anniversary Edition	Easy Star All-Stars	LP, CD	
2014	ES-1043	10/14/14	Together Not Apart	Backbeat Soundsystem	CD	#11 Top Reggae Albums
2014	ES-1044	09/30/14	Steady	Giant Panda Guerilla Dub Squad	CD	#1 Top Reggae Albums #32 Top Heatseekers
2014	N/A	10/28/14	Purple Reggae			
	ES-1040	1/27/15	Vines	Passafire		
2015	ES-1045	01/27/15	Kingston City	New Kingston	CD	#1 Top Reggae Albums
2015	ES-1046	03/09/15	FM	The Skints	LP, CD	#5 Top Reggae Albums
2015	ES-1047	04/07/15	Kings And Queens In Dub	John Brown's Body	CD	#4 Top Reggae Albums
2015	ES-1048	03/24/15	Interval EP	Passafire	Digital only	
2015	ES-1049	05/18/15	Bright Days	Giant Panda Guerilla Dub Squad	LP, CD	
2015	ES-1050	06/16/15	Hustling Culture	The Expanders	LP, CD	#1 Top Reggae Albums
2015	ES-1051	11/13/15	The Big Smoke	Gentleman's Dub Club	LP, CD	#11 Top Reggae Albums
2016	AC-1001	4/4/16	Unified Highway			
2016	ES-1057	10/28/16	Live At Red Rocks	Rebelution	DVD, CD, LP	#1 Top Reggae Albums #31 Top Independent Albums
2016	ES-1054	06/03/16	Falling Into Place	Rebelution	LP, CD	#1 Top Reggae Albums #3 Top Independent Albums #14 Top Tastemakers Albums #32 Billboard 200
2016	ES-1055	7/16	Radiodread (Special Edition)	Easy Star All-Stars		
2016	ES-1056	09/09/16	Fireflies	John Brown's Body	LP, CD	#1 Top Reggae Albums #25 Top Heatseekers
2016	ES-1057	10/07/16	Into The Light	Backbeat Soundsystem	Digital only	
2016	ES-1058	11/11/16	The Big Smoke Remixed	Gentleman's Dub Club	Digital only	
2017	ES-1059	04/07/17	Dubtopia	Gentleman's Dub Club	LP, CD	#8 Top Reggae Albums
2017	ES-1060	05/12/17	Longshot	Passafire	LP, CD	#35 Top Independent Albums
2017	ES-1061	06/30/17	Sharp and Ready	Double Tiger	CD	#5 Top Reggae Albums
2017	ES-1062	08/25/17	A Kingston Story: Come from Far	New Kingston	LP, CD	#4 Top Reggae Albums
2017	ES-1063	10/06/17	Lily of da Valley	Jesse Royal	LP, CD	#1 Top Reggae Albums
2017	ES-1064	09/08/17	Fabric	The Black Seeds	LP, CD	#3 Top Reggae Albums
2017	ES-1065	09/29/17	Old Time Something Come Back Again, Vol. 2	The Expanders	LP, CD	#1 Top Reggae Albums
2017	ES-1066	11/03/17	Smoke	Victor Rice	LP	
2017	ES-1067	10/20/17	Marching Orders	The Green	LP, CD	#1 Top Reggae Albums
2018	ES-1068	06/29/18	A Matter Of Time	Protoje	LP, CD	#1 Top Reggae Albums #7 Top Heatseekers #19 Top Independent Albums
2018	ES-1069	06/15/18	Free Rein	Rebelution	LP, CD	#1 Top Reggae Albums #3 Top Independent Albums #6 Top Tastemakers Albums #41 Billboard 200
2019	ES-1070	1/25/19	Lost In Space	Gentleman's Dub Club	LP, CD	#8 Top Reggae Albums
2019	ES-1071	3/22/19	Black & White	The Green	LP, CD	
2019	ES-1073	5/10/19	Swimming Lessons	The Skints	LP, CD	#1 Top Reggae Albums
2019	ES-1074	7/5/19	Refabricated	The Black Seeds		
2019	ES-1075	9/27/19	Chiliagon	Spragga Benz	LP, CD	#1 Top Reggae Albums
2019	ES-1076	10/4/19	MASS	Bedouin Soundclash	LP, CD	
2019	ES-1077	11/15/19	Fight The Fight	Mortimer	LP, CD	
2020	ES-1078	4/24/2020	Headlines	Unified Highway	LP, CD	
2020	ES-1080	5/15/2020	Drink	Victor Rice	LP	
2020	ES-1082	6/19/2020	Underrated	Fyah Roiall	Digital only	
2020	ES-1081	7/17/2020	Dub Collection	Rebelution	LP, CD	#8 Top Reggae Albums
2020	ES-1083	7/24/2020	Live At Electric Brixton	The Skints	Digital only	
2020	ES-1084	10/30/2020	Star Chile EP	Various Artists	Digital only	
2020	ES-1086	12/04/2020	Lately EP	The Late Ones	Digital only	
2020	ES-1079	12/11/2020	The Journey	Double Tiger	Digital only	
2021	ES-1087	3/12/2021	Down To Earth	Gentleman's Dub Club	LP, CD	
2021	ES-1088	4/9/2021	The Bridge	Indubious	LP, CD	
2021	ES-1090	6/4/2021	Royal	Jesse Royal	LP, CD	
2021	ES-1091	6/18/2021	In The Moment	Rebelution	LP, CD	
2021	ES-1089	10/8/2021	The Fourth Quarter	The Late Ones	LP, CD	
2021	ES-1092	11/5/21	Brand New Eyes	The Green		
2021	ES-1095	11/5/2021	Brave New World	Marcus Gad / Tamal	LP	
2022	ES-1098	3/4/2022	Down To Earth Remixes	Gentleman's Dub Club	Digital only	
2022	ES-1096	3/4/2022	One Rock	Groundation	LP, CD	
2022	ES-1099	4/22/2022	Gratitude Riddim	Various Artists	Digital only	
2022	ES-1094	4/29/2022	Easy Star Presents JonQuan & Associates	Various Artists	LP	
2022	ES-1093	5/6/2022	Slow Burn	Kirsty Rock	Digital only	
2022	ES-1101	6/3/2022	The Bridge Remixed	Indubious	Digital only	
2022	ES-1097	6/17/2022	Love & Fire	The Black Seeds	LP, CD	
2022	ES-1102	11/11/2022	Spirits Eat Music	Sundub	LP, CD	
2023	ES-1104	02/10/2023	Ready For Battle	Marcus Gad	LP, CD	
2023	ES-1103	04/07/2023	Love In Time	Giant Panda Guerilla Dub Squad	LP	
2023	ES-1100	04/21/2023	Ziggy Stardub	Easy Star All-Stars	LP, CD	
2023	ES-1106	05/26/2023	Dreaming From An Iron Gate	Groundation / Brain Damage	LP, CD	
2023	ES-1107	05/26/2023	Right Right Time	Johnny Osbourne	LP, CD	
2023	ES-1105	06/09/2023	On A Mission	Gentleman's Dub Club	LP, CD	
2023	ES-1108	09/15/2023	Ladders	The Loving Paupers	LP	
2023	ES-1109	11/17/2023	Strength	Samory I	LP, CD	#42 The Best 100 Albums of 2023
2024	ES-1110	02/23/2024	L.A.B VI	L.A.B	LP, CD	
2024	ES-1111	05/10/2024	The Ghost of Ladders	The Loving Paupers / Victor Rice	Digital Only	
2024	ES-1113	09/20/2024	From Within	Mortimer	LP, CD	
2024	ES-1114	10/18/2024	Tales of Reality	Kumar Meets the 18th Parallel	LP, CD	
2025	ES-1119	04/11/2025	Off World	Flying Vipers	LP	
2025	ES-1120	06/20/2025	Brooklyn Riddim	SunDub	Digital Only	
2025	ES-1121	06/27/2025	Spain Root	Royal Blu	Digital Only	
2025	ES-1122	10/10/2025	Welcome To Paradise	Naomi Cowan	Digital Only	
2025	ES-1123	9/26/2025	World Inversion	Flying Vipers	Digital Only	
2025	ES-1124	08/29/2025	No Place Like Home	Jesse Royal	Digital Only	
2026	ES-1125	02/06/2026	Tampa Riddim Whole Album	Paris La Mont	Digital Only	
2026	ES-1127	05/01/2026	Supernova	Runkus	Digital, LP	
2026	ES-1131	05/01/2026	Live Lizards	Flying Vipers	CD, Digital, Cassette	
2026	ES-1124	05/15/2026	No Place Like Home Deluxe Digital	Jesse Royal	Digital, LP	
2026	ES-1133	05/15/2026	Shoot Your Arrow	SunDub	Digital Only	
2026	ES-1134	06/19/2026	For All	Marcus Gad / Tamal	Digital Only	

Singles

Incomplete list of Easy Star Records singles

Year	Cat. #	Single name	Artist(s)	Format
1997	ES-001	"Anything For Jah"	Rob Symeonn	7" vinyl
1997	ES-002	"What Goes Around"	Ruff Scott	7" vinyl
1997	ES-003	"Sight Of An Eagle"	Father Sweets	7" vinyl
1997	ES-004	"Time Has Come"	Ossie Dellimore	7" vinyl
2000	ES-005	"Hopes On High"	Luciano	7" vinyl
2000	ES-006	"Third Eye Blind"	Anthony B	7" vinyl
2000	ES-007	"Two Roads"	Triston Palma	7" vinyl
2000	ES-008	"Run Away Heathen"	The Meditations	7" vinyl
2000	ES-009	"Keep On Trying"	Rob Symeonn	7" vinyl
2000	ES-010	"God Love"	Luciano, Triston Palma, Beres Hammond, Michigan, Marcia Griffiths, Delly Ranks, Courtney Melody	7" vinyl
2000	ES-011	"Love So Divine"	Anthony B	7" vinyl
2000	ES-012	"Love Potion No.9"	Half Pint	7" vinyl
2000	ES-015	"Search"	Mojah	7" vinyl
2000	ES-016	"Rescue Me / Rocker's Salvation"	Ticklah	7" vinyl
2007	ES-018	"Pork Eater"	Ticklah	7" vinyl
2007	ES-019	"She's Leaving Home"	Easy Star All-Stars	7" vinyl
2011	ES-020	"Don't Stop The Music"	Easy Star All-Stars	7" vinyl
2019	ES-3053	"Fyah Nuh Hot Like You"	New Kingston	Digital only
2019	ES-3058	"Not Another Word"	Protoje	Digital only
2019	ES-3056	"LionOrder"	Jesse Royal	Digital only
2019	ES-3059	"Tell Me Not"	The Late Ones	Digital only
2019	ES-3060	"If Yuh Ready"	Spragga Benz	Digital only
2019	ES-3062	"Where I'm Coming From"	Lila Ike	Digital only
2019	ES-3063	"Out Of This World"	Gentleman's Dub Club	Digital only
2019	ES-3064	"Riddim Punks Remix"	The Skints	Digital only
2019	ES-3065	"Nobody Man"	Sevana	Digital only
2019	ES-3066	"Lightning"	Mortimer	Digital only
2019	ES-3067	"Bring Your Rays"	New Kingston	Digital only
2019	ES-3068	"Salt Water"	Boudoin Soundclash	Digital only
2019	ES-3069	"Wicked Love"	Spragga Benz	Digital only
2019	ES-3070	"Differ"	Spragga Benz	Digital only
2019	ES-3071	"Differ Remix"	Spragga Benz	Digital only
2019	ES-3072	"Spread Out"	Spragga Benz	Digital only
2019	ES-3073	"Full Bloom"	Bedouin Soundclash	Digital only
2019	ES-3074	"Sweet And Slow"	The Expanders	Digital only
2019	ES-3075	"100%"	Gentleman's Dub Club	Digital only
2019	ES-3076V	"Amageddon"	The Skints	7" Vinyl
2019	ES-3077	"My Hawai'i"	The Green	Digital only
2020	ES-3078	"Use Me"	Gentleman's Dub Club	Digital only
2020	ES-3079	"Headline"	Unified Highway	Digital only
2020	ES-3080	"Unique"	Unified Highway	Digital only
2020	ES-3081	"The Truth"	Unified Highway	Digital only
2020	ES-3082	"Born Into Bad Times"	Boudoin Soundclash	Digital only
2020	ES-3083	"Natty Pablo"	Jesse Royal	Digital only
2020	ES-3084	"Simao"	Victor Rice	Digital only
2020	ES-3085	"Bebida"	Victor Rice	Digital only
2020	ES-3086	"Drop Sound"	Double Tiger	Digital only
2020	ES-3087	"Rub A Dub Party"	Double Tiger	Digital only
2020	ES-3088	"Attention Span Dub"	Rebelution	Digital only
2020	ES-3089	"Lazy Afternoon Dub"	Rebelution	Digital only
2020	ES-3090	"Roots Reggae Music Dub"	Rebelution	Digital only
2020	ES-3091	"Inhale Exhale Dub"	Rebelution	Digital only
2020	ES-3092	"Settle Down Easy Dub"	Rebelution	Digital only
2020	ES-3093	"Disquietude"	Backbeat Soundsystem	Digital only
2020	ES-3094	"Nobody"	Fyah Roiall	Digital only
2020	ES-3095	"Energy"	Fyah Roiall	Digital only
2020	ES-3096	"Oh My Love"	The Skints	Digital only
2020	ES-3097	"No Selfie"	Lutan Fyah	Digital only
2020	ES-3098	"Never Left"	Pressure Busspipe	Digital only
2020	ES-3099	"Stay"	The Steppas	Digital only
2020	ES-3100	"Tribute to Toots"	The Expanders	Digital only
2020	ES-3101	"Universal Love"	Double Tiger	Digital only
2020	ES-3102	"Shadow Dweller"	Double Tiger	Digital only
2020	ES-3103	"Babylon Exists"	The Late Ones	Digital only
2020	ES-3104	"Troubled Streets"	The Late Ones	Digital only
2020	ES-3105	"Neva Bow"	Indubious	Digital only
2020	ES-3106	"Castle In The Sky"	Gentleman's Dub Club	Digital only
2020	ES-3107	"Raised With Love"	The Black Seeds	Digital only
2020	ES-3108	"Play With Fire"	Alandon	Digital only
2020	ES-3109	"Star Chile"	Digital Ancient	Digital only
2020	ES-3110	"Never Left"	Pressure Busspipe	Digital only
2020	ES-3111	"Choppa"	Fyah Roiall	Digital only
2021	ES-3113	"The Truth (Subdocta Remix)"	Unified Highway	Digital only
2021	ES-3114	"Honey"	Gentleman's Dub Club	Digital only
2021	ES-3115	"Night Shift"	Gentleman's Dub Club	Digital only
2021	ES-3116	"Down To Earth"	Gentleman's Dub Club	Digital only
2021	ES-3117	"The Throne"	Indubious	Digital only
2021	ES-3118	"Ease and Flow"	Indubious	Digital only
2021	ES-3119	"The Offering"	Indubious	Digital only
2021	ES-3121	"Satisfied"	Rebelution	Digital only
2021	ES-3122	"Rich Forever"	Jesse Royal	Digital only
2021	ES-3123	"Dirty Money"	Jesse Royal	Digital only
2021	ES-3124	"Natty Dread"	Jesse Royal	Digital only
2021	ES-3125	"Old School Feeling"	Rebelution	Digital only
2021	ES-3126	"Heavy As Lead"	Rebelution	Digital only
2021	ES-3127	"Fake Reggae"	The Late Ones	Digital only
2021	ES-3128	"Tempo"	Marcus Gad, Tamal	Digital only
2021	ES-3129	"Accidental Badman"	JonQuan, Carlton Livingston	Digital only
2021	ES-3130	"One Bright Road"	JonQuan, Elliot Martin	Digital only
2021	ES-3131	"Feeling Myself"	The Late Ones	Digital only
2021	ES-3132	"When Ya Hold Me"	JonQuan, Screechy Dan	Digital only
2021	ES-3133	"Spread Love Around"	JonQuan, Vernon Maytone	Digital only
2021	ES-3134	"In A Man's Heart"	JonQuan, Sammy Dread	Digital only
2021	ES-3138	"Let The Sunshine Through"	The Black Seeds	Digital only
2021	ES-3139	"Sunshine"	Marcus Gad, Tamal	Digital only
2021	ES-3140	"The Weed Song"	Zac Jone$	Digital only
2021	ES-3141	"Brave New World"	Marcus Gad, Tamal	Digital only
2021	ES-3142	"Dancehall Session"	Royal Blu, The Autos	Digital only
2021	ES-3135	"Special Request To Pupa Quan (It A Murdah"	JonQuan, Jonny GoFigure	Digital only
2021	ES-3143	"I Can Breathe (Gaudi Remix)	Indubious, Gaudi	Digital only
2021	ES-3137	"I Am Trying"	JonQuan, Kelly DiFillipo	Digital only
	ES-3136	"Lean"	JonQuan, Danny Rebel	Digital only
2022	ES-3144	"Sugar Rush (Bish and Gray Remix)"	Gentleman's Dub Club	Digital only
2022	ES-3145	"Bring The Sun"	The Black Seeds	Digital only
2022	ES-3146	"Human Race"	Groundation	Digital only
2022	ES-3147	"Sunny Monday"	JonQuan, Eazy D	Digital only
2022	ES-3148	"One Rock"	Groundation	Digital only
2022	ES-3149	"It's So Real"	The Black Seeds	Digital only
2022	ES-3150	"Game Over"	The Black Seeds	Digital only
2022	ES-3151	Original Riddim"	Groundation	Digital only
2022	ES-3152	"Night Shift (GDC Mix)"	Gentleman's Dub Club	Digital only
2022	ES-3154	"Down to Earth" (Dubmatix Remix)	Gentleman's Dub Club	Digital only
2022	ES-3153	"Ease and Flow (Ted Bowne Remix)	Indubious, Passafire, Mike Love	Digital only
2022	ES-3155	"Market Price"	Groundation	Digital only
2022	ES-3156	"The Offering" (Kalya Scintilla Remix)	Indubious	Digital only
2022	ES-3157	"The Feeling"	Kirsty Rock	Digital only
2022	ES-3158	"LEO"	Kirsty Rock	Digital only
2022	ES-3159	"Green Is"	Kirsty Rock	Digital only
2022	ES-3160	"Neva Bow" (Evton B Remix)	Indubious	Digital only
2022	ES-3161	"Gratitude"	Jaz Elise	Digital only
2022	ES-3162	"Love and Mercy"	Samory I	Digital only
2022	ES-3163	"The Throne" (E.N. Young Dub)	Indubious	Digital only
2022	ES-3164	"Life Joyful"	Indubious	Digital only
2022	ES-3165	"Will of Jah"	The Autos, Nick Sefakis	Digital only
2022	ES-3166	"Whole Heap"	Mortimer	Digital only
2022	ES-3167	"Jump and Dance"	Sundub, Lutan Fyah	Digital only
2022	ES-3168	"Spirits Eat Music"	SunDub	Digital only
2022	ES-3169	"New Ways To Love"	SunDub	Digital only
2022	ES-3170	"The Weed Song"	Zac Jone$, Jesse Royal, Sheen	Digital only
2022	ES-3171	"Blood In The Streets"	Samory I	Digital only
2022	ES-3173	"Ready For Battle"	Marcus Gad	Digital only
2023	ES-3174	"Artillery"	Royal Blu, Roe Summerz, The Autos	Digital only
2023	ES-3175	"Chants"	Giant Panda Guerilla Dub Squad, Clinton Fearon	Digital only
2023	ES-3176	"Revolution"	Giant Panda Guerilla Dub Squad, The Movement	Digital only
2023	ES-3177	"Long Way Home"	Marcus Gad	Digital only
2023	ES-3178	"Starman"	Easy Star All-Stars, Maxi Priest	Digital only
2023	ES-3179	"Moonage Daydream"	Easy Star All-Stars, Naomi Cowan	Digital only
2023	ES-3180	"Five Years"	Easy Star All-Stars, Steel Pulse	Digital only
2023	ES-3181	"Rock N Roll Suicide"	Easy Star All-Stars	Digital only
2023	ES-3182	"The Throne" (Enzymes Remix)	Indubious	Digital only
2023	ES-3183	"Run For Cover/Sugar Coated Lies"	Gentleman's Dub Club	Digital only
2023	ES-3184	"High Hopes"	Gentleman's Dub Club	Digital only
2023	ES-3185	"Play My Games"	Gentleman's Dub Club	Digital only
2023	ES-3186	"Gone"	Gentleman's Dub Club	Digital only
2023	ES-3187	"Rice & Peas"	Jaz Elise	Digital only
2023	ES-3188	"Kiss Somebody"	Johnny Osbourne	Digital only
2023	ES-3189	"Hope"	Jesse Royal, Romain V	Digital only
2023	ES-3190	"Forgiveness"	Groundation, Brain Damage	Digital only
2023	ES-3191	"Deaf Ears"	Groundation, Brain Damage	Digital only
2023	ES-3192	"Get Up"	Johnny Osbourne	Digital only
2023	ES-3193	"In Your Eyes"	Johnny Osbourne	Digital only
2023	ES-3194	"Crown"	Samory I	Digital only
2023	ES-3195	"Doe Care"	Zac Jone$	Digital only
2023	ES-3196	"Ladder"	Loving Paupers	Digital only
2023	ES-3197	"Mary"	Loving Paupers	Digital only
2023	ES-3198	"Wrath"	Samory I, Kabaka Pyramid, Capleton	Digital only
2023	ES-3199	"Cali Heart"	Arise Roots, The Autos, Massif	Digital only
2023	ES-3201	"Continent"	Samory I	Digital only
2023	ES-3202	"History of Violence"	Samory I	Digital only
2023	ES-3203	"High Hopes - Selecta J-Man Remix (Dub)"	Gentleman's Dub Club, Eva Lazarus, Selecta J-Man	Digital only
2023	ES-3204	"Your Love"	Giant Panda, Laura Hanrahan	Digital only
2023	ES-3205	"Outside"	Samory I	Digital only
2023	ES-3206	"Blessing"	Jesse Royal, Yohan Marley	Digital only
2023	ES-3207	"Oh No (Pt. 2)"	L.A.B.	Digital Only
2024	ES-3209	"Slowly"	Mortimer	Digital Only
2024	ES-3208	"Ocean Demon"	L.A.B.	Digital Only
2024	ES-3212	"Cool & Easy"	The Autos, Chris Malachi	Digital Only
2024	ES-3216	"Dubbing My Friends"	The Loving Paupers, Victor Rice	Digital Only
2024	ES-3213	"Cultivator"	JonQuan, Linval Thompson	7" Vinyl
2024	ES-3218	"Chants Dubbed and Remixed"	Giant Panda Guerilla Dub Squad, Clinton Fearon	Digital Only
2024	ES-3217	"Dub In The Pocket Of My Hometown"	The Loving Paupers, Victor Rice	Digital Only
2024	ES-3219	"Not A Day Goes By"	Mortimer	Digital Only
2024	ES-3220	"Light My Way"	Royal Blu, Kabaka Pyramid, The Autos	Digital Only
2024	ES-3221	"My Child"	Mortimer	Digital Only
2024	ES-3222	"World Wide Love"	Kumar meets The 18th Parallel	Digital Only
2024	ES-3224	"Don't Cry"	Kaylan Arnold, The Autos	Digital Only
2024	ES-3214	"Bound To Fall"	JonQuan, Linval Thompson	7" Vinyl
2024	ES-3223	"Bruises"	Mortimer	Digital Only
2024	ES-3225	"Salvation"	Kumar meets The 18th Parallel	Digital Only
2024	ES-3227	"Kingston Heat"	Samory I	Digital Only
2024	ES-3228	"Follow (Edit)"	L.A.B.	Digital Only
2024	ES-3215	"Top Ranking"	JonQuan, Ranking Joe, Victor Rice	Digital Only
2024	ES-3229	"Stranger Twice"	Royal Blu	Digital Only
2024	ES-3226	"Show Me / Show & Tell"	Flying Vipers	7" Vinyl
2024	ES-3231	"Your Soul"	Jesse Royal	Digital Only
2024	ES-3230	"Unforgettable"	Jaz Elise	Digital Only
2025	ES-3232	"Believers & Deceivers"	Flying Vipers	Digital Only
2025	ES-3234	"Arms"	Royal Blu, D'yani	Digital Only
2025	ES-3233	"Jackals"	Flying Vipers	Digital Only
2025	ES-3235	"Light of Mine"	Jesse Royal	Digital Only
2025	ES-3236	"Hard Fight"	John Brown's Body	Digital Only
2025	CSSL001	"Elevation"	HIRIE	Digital Only
2025	ES-3237	"Hard Fight Dub"	John Brown's Body, I Grade Dub	Digital Only
2025	ES-3238	"Brooklyn Riddim Batch 1"	SunDub, Giant Panda Guerilla Dub Squad, Sailor Jane, Clatta Bumboo	Digital Only
2025	ES-3239	"True Lies"	Naomi Cowan	Digital Only
2025	ES-3240	"Brooklyn Riddim Batch 2"	SunDub, Cas Haley, Salomon Beda, The Meditations, Vysionaer	Digital Only
2025	ES-3241	"Never Get A Good Shot"	The Autos, Christos DC	Digital Only
2025	ES-3243	"3310"	Runkus	Digital Only
2025	ES-3242	"Life from Kingston"	Royal Blu, Protoje	Digital Only
2025	ES-3244	"40,000 Years"	John Brown's Body	Digital Only
2025	ES-3245	"Brooklyn Riddim Batch 3"	SunDub, Easy Star All-Stars, Mo'Kalamity, Kumar, Coolie Ranx, Taj Weekes	Digital Only
2025	ES-3247	"Up to di Time"	Naomi Cowan	Digital Only
2025	ES-3248	"40,000 Years of Dub"	John Brown's Body	Digital Only
2025	ES-3246	"Cherry On Top"	Naomi Cowan	Digital Only
2025	ES-3249	"Yearning"	Double Tiger, Sly & Robbie	Digital Only
2025	ES-3251	"Persistency"	Flying Vipers, Earl Sixteen	Digital only
2025	ES-3252	"Little Bit of Some"	John Brown's Body	Digital only
2025	ES-3253	"Burn It To The Ground"	Paris La Mont, Mortimer	Digital only
2025	CSSL003	"I Am Your Vibe"	HIRIE	Digital only
2025	ES-3254	"Tampa Riddim Set 1"	Paris La Mont	Digital only
2025	ES-3255	"Tampa Riddim Batch 2"	Paris La Mont	Digital only
2025	ES-3256	"Existential Dread at the Control"	Flying Vipers	Digital only
2025	CSSL004	"All Is Ok"	HIRIE	Digital only
2025	ES-3258	"Sword of Sorrow Dub"	John Brown's Body	Digital only
2025	ES-3259	"Sure As The Sun"	Runkus	Digital only
2025	ES-3260	"Tampa Riddim Batch 3"	Paris La Mont	Digital only
2025	ES-3261	"Immortality"	The Autos, Micah Shemaiah	Digital only
2025	ES-3262	"Spirits Eat Music"	SubDub, Scientist	Digital only
2025	ES-3263	"Try" (Tampa Riddim)	Paris La Mont, Chris Malachi, Joby Jay	Digital only
2025	ES-3264	"Inna Earth"	Medisun, The Autos	Digital only
2025	ES-3265	"Jump and Dance"	SunDub, Scientist	Digital only
2025	ES-3266	"Gwan Walk"	JonQuan, Rik Jam	Digital only
2025	ES-3267	"Love Garden"	Double Tiger	Digital only
2025	ES-3268	"876#"	Medisun, The Autos	Digital only
2026	ES-3269	"A Believer"	Runkus	Digital only
2026	ES-3250	"Life Over Death"	Runkus	Digital only
2026	ES-3271	"Ignite"	Jesse Royal	Digital only
2026	ES-3272	"Sent Us Away"	SunDub	Digital only
2026	ES-3273	"Walk Away"	Double Tiger	Digital only
2026	ES-3274	"Don't Let Me Down"	SunDub	Digital only
2026	ES-3270	"Every Ghetto Youth is a Star"	Runkus	Digital only
2026	ES-3276	"Shoot Your Arrow"	SunDub	Digital only
2026	ES-1132	"Live Lizards"	Flying Vipers	Digital only
2026	ES-3280	"Herbs Man"	Kamrun, Jesse Royal, Paris La Mont	Digital only
2026	ES-3279	"Clean Energy"	The Autos, Kxng Izem	Digital only
2026	ES-3278	"Something Wrong In Dub"	The Expanders	Digital only
2026	ES-3281	"Santa"	Mmzy, Paris La Mont	Digital only
2026	ES-3282	"Volcano"	Spice	Digital only
2026	ES-3283	"Shine A Light"	Marcus Gad, Tamal	Digital only
2026	ES-3284	"Home"	The Skints	Digital only

DVDs

Cat. #	Date	DVD title	Artist(s)	Notes
ES-2001	June 27, 2006	June 27, 2006	Easy Star All-Stars	Live concert video
