= The Skints =

English reggae punk band

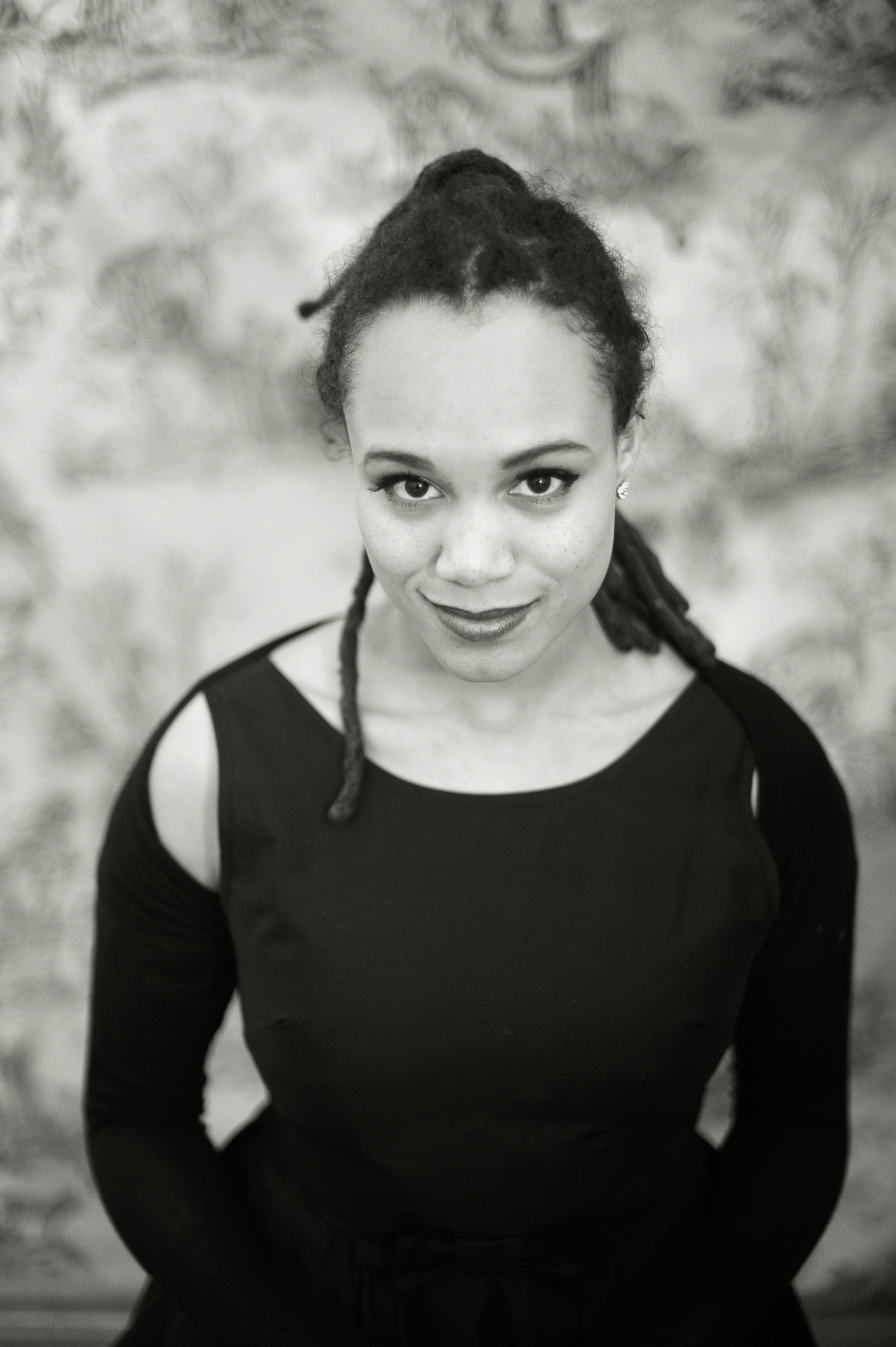
- Marcia Richards. The Skints. 2013.

Background information
- Origin: London, England
- Genres: Reggae fusion, reggae, ska, dub, punk
- Years active: 2007–present
- Labels: Penny Drop Recordings (imprint); Easy Star Records; Mr Bongo Records; Bomber Music
- Members: Jamie Kyriakides; Marcia Richards; Joshua Waters Rudge; Jonathan Doyle
- Website: www.theskints.co.uk

The Skints are an English reggae punk band from London, described by Clash Music as "the torchbearers for modern British reggae music." The Skints mix reggae, ska, dub, punk rock, dancehall, soul, and rap, touring extensively across the UK, Europe and the United States. Their album Swimming Lessons (2019) debuted at number 1 on the Billboard reggae chart. Their original style of music has been described as "tropical punk".

== History ==
=== Early years ===
The Skints formed as school friends at Woodbridge High School (London). The band hail from the Leyton/Walthamstow and South Woodford/Woodford areas of east London. They settled on the current line-up in May 2007. The Skints relentlessly gigged all over London's punk rock and squat party circuit before venturing out of the M25 to play their first self-booked DIY tour, alongside fellow east Londoners ClayPigeon in summer 2008. The band then released a six-track ska-punk/reggae EP on Do The Dog Music and were subsequently offered their first UK tour, as main support to The King Blues. This was extremely successful and allowed them to start making a name for themselves in the UK underground punk scene.

=== 2009-2011: Live. Breathe. Build. Believe. ===
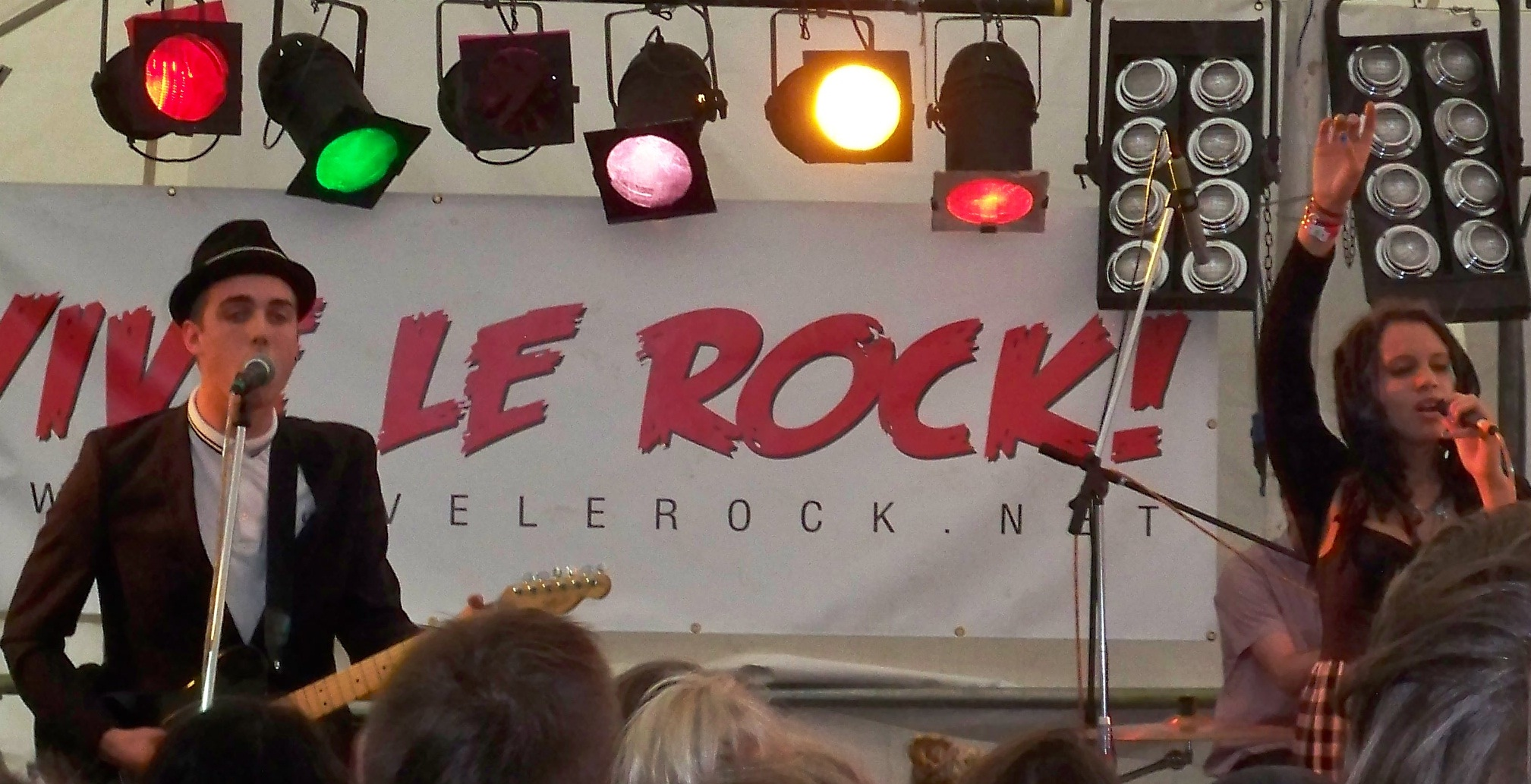
The Skints at Guilfest 2011

Over the next year the band toured with the likes of The Slackers, Sonic Boom Six, The Aggrolites and Random Hand. Recorded by Peter Miles, the debut album Live.Breathe.Build.Believe was initially released on 9 November 2009 and contains 10 tracks (plus one hidden track) mixing reggae, ska and dub with a thrash of hardcore punk rock. Recording was done in 5 days, with an extra 2 days allowed for mixing. The band's first headline UK run started with a sold-out show at Camden Barfly. In January 2010 the band were featured on the BBC Radio 1 Punk Show with Mike Davies and toured the UK with Random Hand, Chris Murray and Mouthwash as the "Rebel Alliance Tour". Live.Breathe.Build.Believe was re-released through their publisher, Bomber Music, in June 2010. They then toured Germany for the first time with The Slackers and played extensively across the UK that summer, culminating in their first appearance on The Lock Up Stage at Reading and Leeds Festivals. A seven-inch picture disc vinyl single, "Up Against The Wall" was released on Seven Inch Records in October 2010, featuring a dub version by prolific dub producer Mad Professor. Shortly afterwards the band embarked on a 5-week tour of the UK consisting of headline shows (including a sell out at the Camden Underworld) and two separate support runs with Bedouin Soundclash and Sublime with Rome, respectively. February 2011, The Skints supported Reel Big Fish on a 28-date tour of the UK and Europe.

=== 2012-2014: Part & Parcel ===
In April 2011 The Skints started a successful campaign through Pledgemusic to crowdfund their second album. That summer they recorded with Mike "Prince Fatty" Pelanconi as producer, as well as a host of festival appearances including Slam Dunk Festival and their first Boomtown Fair. Autumn 2011, The Skints toured the UK supporting Gym Class Heroes. In January 2012, The Skints announced the title and release date of the album to be "Part & Parcel", released officially by Bomber Music on 12 March 2012. The Skints collaborated with British dancehall MC Parly B on the album. They opened for British rock band You Me at Six on their UK tour in March 2012, which also had sets played by Mayday Parade and Kids In Glass Houses. In May 2012, the band's splitter van was stolen on a day off between shows from outside guitarist Josh Waters Rudge's home, containing all their equipment. Banquet Records helped the band out by putting on a benefit show for the band to play in Kingston, with all proceeds going towards new equipment. In October 2012 The Skints did a 10 headline date tour of the UK, in support of Part & Parcel, selling out every show and ending at an oversold Scala in London. May 2013 they followed this up with a 21-show-in-19-day headline run which so them headline London's KOKO (music venue) with new single "Out My Mind". Part & Parcel was released in France on 29 January 2013 on Soulbeats Records. This launched the band into 2 years of heavy touring across France, including a main stage performance at Reggae Sun Ska Festival replacing Chronixx, who was delayed due to tour bus problems. 2014 saw the release of the "Short Change EP" on their own label, Penny Drop Recordings, a heavy festival summer and support slots with Fat Freddy’s Drop in Utrecht and Berlin and Me First and the Gimme Gimmes in the UK. The Skints then entered the studio with Prince Fatty to begin work on their third LP.

=== 2015-2017: FM ===
The Skints released "FM" on 9 March 2015 after signing a one-album deal with New York City independent reggae label Easy Star Records. A concept album of sorts (virtually unheard of in the reggae/ska genre), FM is set on a fictional pirate radio station on the "hottest day of the year" in London, the three featured MCs across the album (Tippa Irie, Horseman and Rival) play the station's DJs in the album's skits, as well as an appearance from English comedian Rufus Hound. The Skints have said they were inspired by Songs For The Deaf by Queens Of The Stone Age and the Spike Lee movie, Do The Right Thing in regards to the album's audio-theatrical concept.
FM reached number 5 on the Billboard Reggae Albums chart and number 7 on the Independent Albums Chart in the UK.
Touring was kicked off with a 4-week headline run in Europe and the UK with support from Hollie Cook, culminating in a headline show at Shepherd’s Bush Empire. The band then flew to the USA for their first ever American tour which including supporting Easy Star All-Stars and Fishbone on the East Coast and flying to the West for their first Cali Roots and a Punk Rock Bowling side show supporting The Mighty Mighty Bosstones and The English Beat. In 2016 The Skints travelled the USA a further 4 times, Tribal Seeds ‘Winter Reggae Land’ Tour in January/February, a May/June tour featuring West Coast dates with The Expanders and Morgan Heritage and an October East Coast tour supporting Sublime With Rome, taking them to Canada for the first time. They ended the year with a sold-out headline show at the Knitting Factory in Brooklyn, The Mighty Mighty Bosstones Hometown Throwdown in Boston and a New Year's Eve show with Sublime With Rome in Pennsylvania. 2016 saw the band host their own pop-up party/mini festival "Nice Time London" in Hackney which featured live performances from Jamaican rising star Jesse Royal and New Kingston and full sound system session on the other side of the room from Reggae Roast. That year The Skints also joined the Fireball "Fuelling The Fire" tour alongside Less Than Jake and Mariachi El Bronx across the UK's O2 Academy venues. In 2017 they collaborated with Signature Brew to produce "Nice Time" pale ale, stocking it in venues across the UK which they subsequently sold out with their own shows. The band flew back to North America for Victoria Ska Fest in Canada and a USA summer tour opening for 311. Autumn saw them tour Japan with Asian Man Records legends Kemuri and Bruce Lee Band before coming home to write their next full-length record.

=== 2018-present: Swimming Lessons ===
In 2018, The Skints entered the Fish Factory in Harlesden, London to begin work on the follow-up to "FM". With a view to "push all ends of the spectrum of what The Skints music is and can be", the band headed production and creative vision and enlisted engineer Ben Lamdin (Nostalgia 77) to record the majority of the instrumentation, with Jack Longman covering additional vocal recording and production. During sessions, the band went to their first album producer Peter Miles in Devon to record the "heavier rock moments" of the album, before delivering the project to Prince Fatty who mixed the album at Jah Dub Studios in Si Racha District, Thailand. Spending the majority of 2018 in the studio, the band emerged to play a handful of festivals including Slam Dunk Festival, Summerjam, Boomtown Fair and a sold out O2 Brixton Academy as main support to Californian punk legends NOFX.

‘Learning To Swim’ was the first new single, accompanied by a video directed by Tom Sykes at Drop Drop Clothing's warehouse in Sheffield. A song about Marcia Richards coping with the loss of her younger sister Roanna, the verses see the band playing in a steppers lovers rock reggae style, before breaking out into a heavy guitar-driven rock chorus.

Before flying out to Florida for the 311 Caribbean Cruise 2019, it was announced that The Skints fourth album would be titled "Swimming Lessons" and released 10 May 2019 on Easy Star Records (North/South America) and Brighton-based label Mr Bongo Records (Rest of World).

Lyrically their darkest and most introspective release to date, Swimming Lessons sees The Skints go from heavy rubadub, to blistering punk, to chiptune-influenced dancehall beats, to harmony laden soul. Whilst the band experimented with more guitar driven styles of music, all three featured artists across the album were from Jamaica; Runkus, Jesse Royal and Grammy-nominated vocalist, Protoje.

‘Restless’ featuring Protoje was the next video, released the same week as Swimming Lessons, and saw the band acting as "the world's worst news station", a single non-breaking, all-in-one shot with Protoje appearing as the "foreign correspondent."

"Swimming Lessons" has proved to be the band's best received record to date, debuted at number 1 on the reggae Billboard charts in the USA, number 1 Independent Album Breakers Chart, number 4 Independent Record Store Sales Chart and number 6 on Vinyl Album Chart in the UK.

Shortly after release, The Skints were invited by legendary British reggae DJ legend David Rodigan to be interviewed on his BBC Radio 1xtra, who praised the songwriting and diversity of Swimming Lessons, as well as the band's journey and work ethic, which was followed up with a live session at BBC Maida Vale Studios. BBC Radio 6 Music also showed support for Swimming Lessons, making it ‘Album Of The Day’ upon release and playlisting ‘Armageddon’ ft. Runkus that summer.

May and June 2019 the band returned to Cali Roots Festival and made their main stage debut at Punk Rock Bowling before embarking on their first headline tour of the American West Coast, including shows at Los Angeles’ Echoplex and The Casbah in San Diego.

The Skints headed out for a month on the road across Germany, France, Belgium, the Netherlands and the UK for their biggest headlining tour to date, including a 1500-capacity sold-out hometown show at Electric Brixton. Support on the UK dates came from long time friends of the band Bedouin Soundclash from Toronto.

January 2020 the band made their debut UK TV appearance as guests on CBeebies show "YolanDa's Band Jam". Hosted by YolanDa Brown, the show consists of YolanDa inviting musical guests to play along with a live audience of children aged five to seven.

The Skints were invited as special guests to tour with Hellcat Records LA band The Interrupters UK tour throughout January/February, before releasing an animated music video for their controversial anti-Brexit song, "The Island".

=== Touring and work ethic ===
The Skints are renowned for their heavy touring ethic and despite a lack of attention from mainstream media outlets, have gained a sizeable cult following over time.

To date, The Skints have toured in the United Kingdom, the United States, Canada, Germany, France, Italy, Spain, Greece, Bulgaria, Slovenia, Slovakia, Luxembourg, Poland, the Netherlands, Belgium, Switzerland, the Czech Republic, Croatia, Finland, Réunion, Japan and Thailand.

The band have also never signed with a major record label and have instead opted to do one-album licensing deals with independent record companies in order to retain rights and creative freedom.

=== Musical style and influences ===
The Skints are known for their stylistic diversity across genres and tempos, and have the unique feature of three different lead vocalists in the group. While the very early inception of the band was rooted in a ska-punk style, The Skints have evolved to envelop the full range of influences from Jamaica from traditional ska, to rubadub, dub and dancehall plus British grime music, soul, pop and hardcore punk.

Influences for Swimming Lessons have been cited as far reaching as Bad Brains, Popcaan, No Doubt, Alton Ellis, Michael Prophet, Wiley and Weezer.

Their style has been referred to as "East London Reggae" and "music from Jamaica in a London style."

More recently they have used the term "tropical punk" to describe their sound which started as a joke in the studio with Prince Fatty in reference to friend Hollie Cook; "if Hollie's tropical pop then this album is tropical punk!"

== Band members ==
- Jamie Kyriakides – vocals, drums, guitar
- Joshua Waters Rudge – vocals, guitar
- Jonathan Doyle – bass guitar
- Marcia Richards – vocals, keyboards, alto saxophone, melodica, flute, guitar, sampler, harp

== Discography ==
=== Albums ===
Year	Title	Label
2009; 2010 (re-release)	Live.Breathe.Build.Believe	Rebel Alliance; Bomber Music (re-release)
2012	Part & Parcel	Bomber Music/Penny Drop Recordings/asbestos records
2015	FM	Easy Star Records
2019	Swimming Lessons	Mr Bongo / Easy Star Records

=== EPs ===
Year	Title	Label
2008	The Skints EP	Do The Dog
2014	Short Change EP	Penny Drop Recordings/Soulbeats Records
