= Brain Damage (dub band) =

French dub band

Brain Damage is a French dub band from Saint-Étienne. The band was founded in 1999 by Martin Nathan and bass player Raphael Talis. It is considered one of the pioneering dub bands in France.

== History ==
In the early 2000, Brain Damage experimented their first international collaborations in London with Dub specialists like The Disciples, Alpha and Omega, Zion Train or with the MC Tena Stelin. Their works based on Spoken word and Dub Poetry led them to include numerous voices in their tracks, like Black Sifichi and many others afterwards.

From 2011 on, with the departure of Raphael for other projects, Brain Damage was to be composed solely of its frontman, Martin Nathan.

In 2015 and 2016 the band released two albums based on collaborations with Jamaican artists Horace Andy, Winston Mc Anuff, Kiddus I, Willi Williams and Ras Michael.

In 2017, Martin's first collaboration with Harrison Stafford, leader of Groundation, gave birth to the album Liberation Time.

In 2021 Brain Damage produced Brain Damage meets Big Youth-Beyond the Blue, with Big Youth.

In 2023 Groundation meets Brain Damage-Dreaming From An Iron Gate, a second major collaboration with Harrison Stafford.

== Discography ==
=== EPs ===
- Bipolar Disorder (Bangarang) – 1999
- Brain Damage Dub Sessions meets Sir Jean (Jarring Effects) – 2012

=== Studio albums ===
- Always greener (on the other side) (Bangarang/Hammerbass) – 2002
- Ashes to ashes / Dub to dub (Bangarang/Hammerbass/Sounds Around) – 2004
- Spoken dub manifesto vol.1 (Bangarang/Jarring Effects) – 2006
- Short Cuts (Bangarang/Jarring Effects) – 2008
- Burning before Sunset (Jarring Effects/Discograph) – 2010
- Burning before sunset featuring Black Sifichi (Jarring Effects) – 2010
- High Damage by High Tone meets Brain Damage (Jarring Effects) – 2012
- What you gonna do? (Jarring Effects) – 2012
- Empire Soldiers by Brain Damage meets Vibronics (Jarring Effects) – 2013
- Walk The Walk (Jarring Effects) – 2015
- Talk The Talk (Jarring Effects) – 2016
- Liberation Times by Brain Damage meets Harrison Stafford (Jarring Effects) – 2017
- Ya no mas ! (Jarring Effects) – 2018
- Beyond the Blue by Brain Damage meets Big Youth (Jarring Effects) – 2021
- Dreaming From an Iron Gate by Groundation meets Brain Damage (Baco Records) – 2023

=== Live albums ===
- Short Cuts Live (Jarring Effects/Discograph) – 2009
- Empire Soldiers Live (Jarring Effects / L'Autre Distribution) – 2015
