= Outlook festival =

Music festival in Croatia

Outlook
- Gentleman's Dub Club performing at Outlook Festival
- Genre: Dubstep, reggae, hip hop, ragga, Drum and Bass, Garage, House, techno.
- Dates: July–September
- Locations: Croatia (Petrčane, Novalja, Pula)
- Years active: 2008 – present
- Website: https://outlookfestival.com/

Outlook Festival is a musical event, started as a subsidiary of Leeds event SubDub, hosting all kinds of bass music. Previously, the festival was held just outside the city of Pula, Croatia, before relocating to Tisno, Croatia in 2020. Although held in Croatia, many of the attendees come from the United Kingdom as do much of the team involved in organizing the festival, however there is a large global following for the festival.

Previously held in Fort Punta Christo and the surrounding beaches, the festival is unique in its setting, with sound systems and stages being erected in various tunnels and even the moat of the abandoned ruins.

The festival also plays host to a number of boat parties which feature artists from the festival and sail around the Adriatic coastline playing more individual selections of music than other stages around the festival.

The 2011 edition of the festival saw an increase of almost double the capacity and the introduction of a number of new stages. This led to mixed reviews from attendees of the previous festival, some of whom preferred the more intimate setting, however the larger audience allowed festival organisers to book some relatively exclusive artists who perhaps may not have been within the budget otherwise.

Past performers include Skream, Benga, Digital Mystikz, Johnny Clarke, Pharoahe Monch, Horace Andy, David Rodigan, Jamie xx, Shy FX, Friction, Dawn Penn, Iration Steppas, P Money, Plastician, Phi Life Cypher, Phaeleh, Channel One, Eksman, Gentleman's Dub Club, Congo Natty, Jehst, Foreign Beggars, D Double E, Loyle Carner and Boiler Room (music broadcaster).

The UK Festival Awards gave Outlook the title of ‘Best Overseas Festival’ in 2011.

== See also ==
- List of electronic music festivals
