= Naomi Cowan =

Jamaican-Canadian reggae musician

- Cowan in 2019

Background information
- Born: Kingston, Jamaica
- Genre: Reggae
- Occupation: Musician
- Years active: 2000–present
- Label: Easy Star Records

Naomi Cowan is a Jamaican-Canadian reggae musician.

== Life and career ==
Cowan was born in Kingston, Jamaica, the daughter of Tommy Cowan, a musician, and Carlene Davis, a gospel and reggae singer. She attended and graduated from Toronto Metropolitan University. She began her career in 2000, where she performed background vocals on the song Redeemed in 2000, and in 2004, she performed background vocals on the song The Author & Finisher.

Later in her career, in 2017, Cowan collaborated with Mark Pelli and released the song Things You Say You Love, and in 2018, she released her breakout song Paradise Plum. She collaborated with Easy Star Records, an independent record label. In 2025, she released the album Welcome to Paradise, for which she won a Juno Award in the category Reggae Recording of the Year in 2026.
