= Passafire =

American reggae rock band

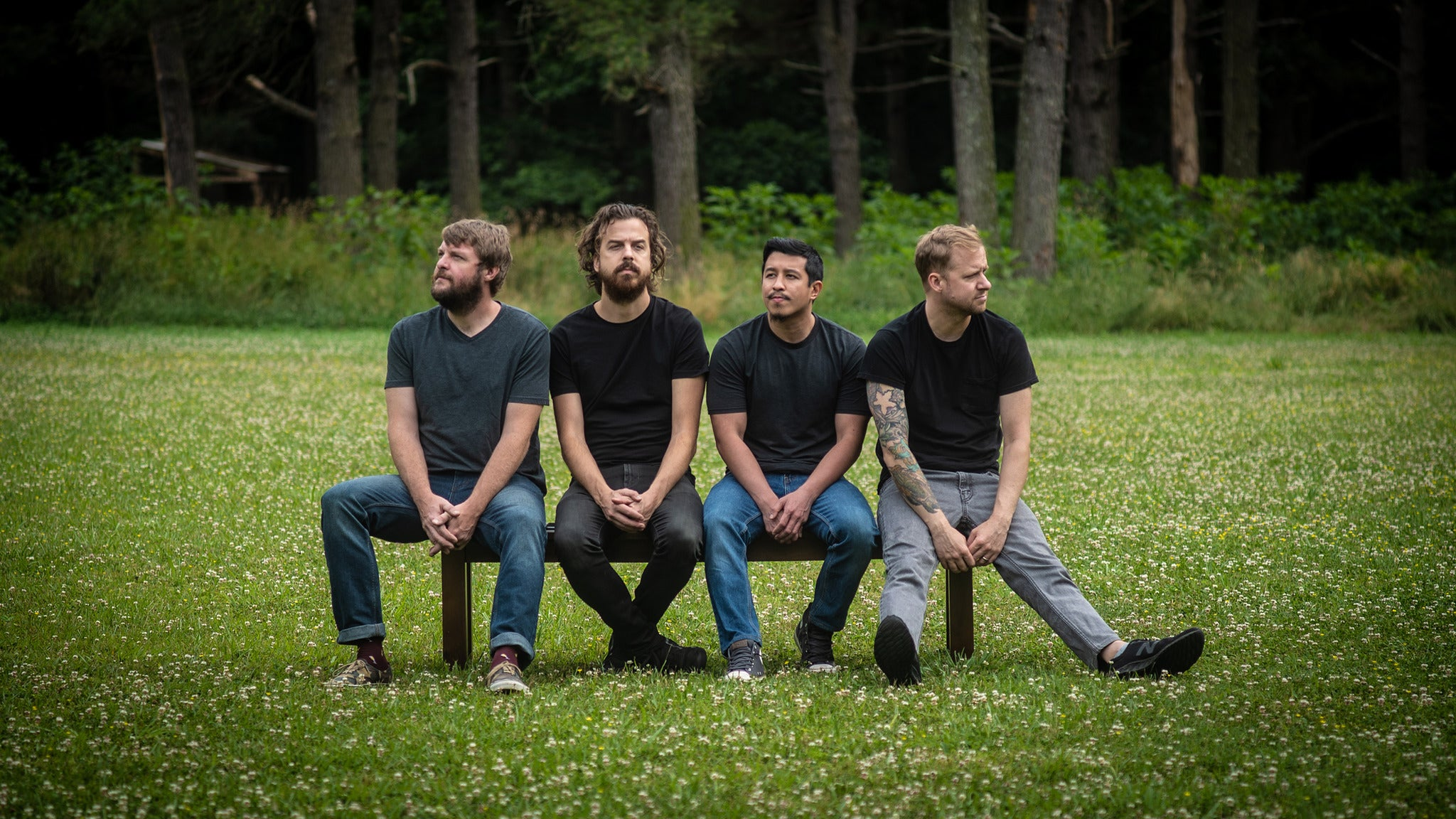
- Left to right: Ted Bowne, Will Kubley, Mike DeGuzman, Nick Kubley

Background information
- Origin: Savannah, Georgia, United States
- Genres: Reggae rock; progressive rock
- Label: Easy Star
- Members: Ted Bowne; Will Kubley; Mike DeGuzman; Nick Kubley
- Past members: Adam Willis; Tom Heet
- Website: passafire.com

Passafire is a reggae rock band based in Savannah, Georgia.

== History ==
=== Formation and Self-titled album (2003–2006) ===
Passafire was founded in 2003 by Savannah, Georgia natives Ted Bowne on vocals/guitar and Nick Kubley on drums who at the time were students attending Savannah College of Art and Design (SCAD). Adding Tom Heet on bass and Adam Willis on keyboard, Passafire became a quartet. Their debut self-produced, self-titled album Passafire was released on August 29, 2006.

=== Submersible (2007) ===
After Heet's departure from the band, Passafire added Nick's brother Will Kubley on bass and additional vocals. Their sophomore album, Submersible was released on September 18, 2007. It was recognized by iTunes as one of the "Top 10 Best Reggae Albums of 2007".

=== Everyone on Everynight (2009) ===
Passafire's third album, Everyone on Everynight, was released on September 15, 2009, on Pepper's recording label, LAW Records.

=== Start From Scratch (2011) ===
Their fourth album, Start From Scratch was released on their on record label FlameGuy Records. It was produced by Paul Leary and debuted on September 27, 2011. The album reached #1 on the Billboard Top Reggae Albums chart.

Start from Scratch marked the departure of original keyboardist Adam Willis from the band in 2010. It was the first album to feature Mike DeGuzman on the keys, who was discovered after playing with The Expendables in Chicago during the 2010 Winter Blackout Tour. Adam Willis had left the band for personal reasons after the decision to not continue touring and parted ways with Passafire amicably.

They also released Remixed From Scratch in 2012, which featured dub music mixes and remixes of their songs from the previous album.

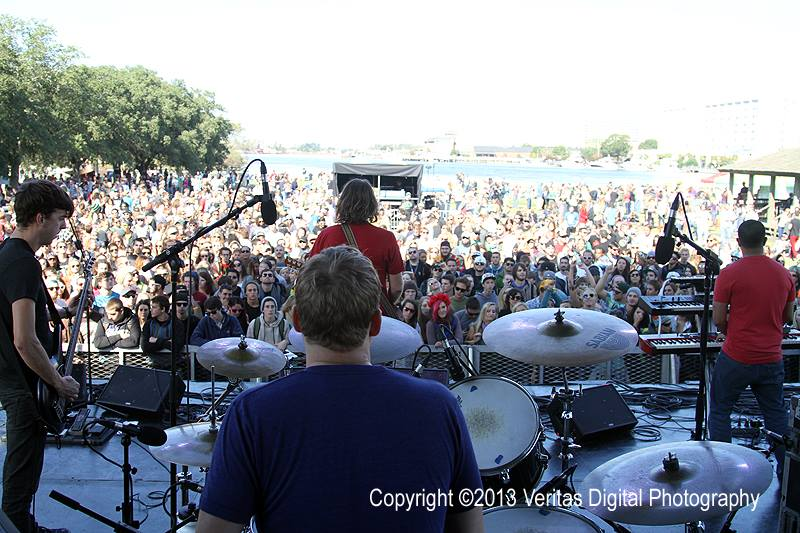
Passafire at The Cali Roots Festival: Carolina Sessions in 2013

=== Vines (2013) ===
In 2013, Passafire signed with NYC's Easy Star Records, who welcomed them to the Easy Star family.

Passafire's fifth album, Vines, was released on November 11, 2013, and ranked at #1 on the Billboard Top Reggae Albums chart. This came after working again with Paul Leary, who also worked alongside Sublime, Pepper, U2, Slightly Stoopid, and several other successful groups.

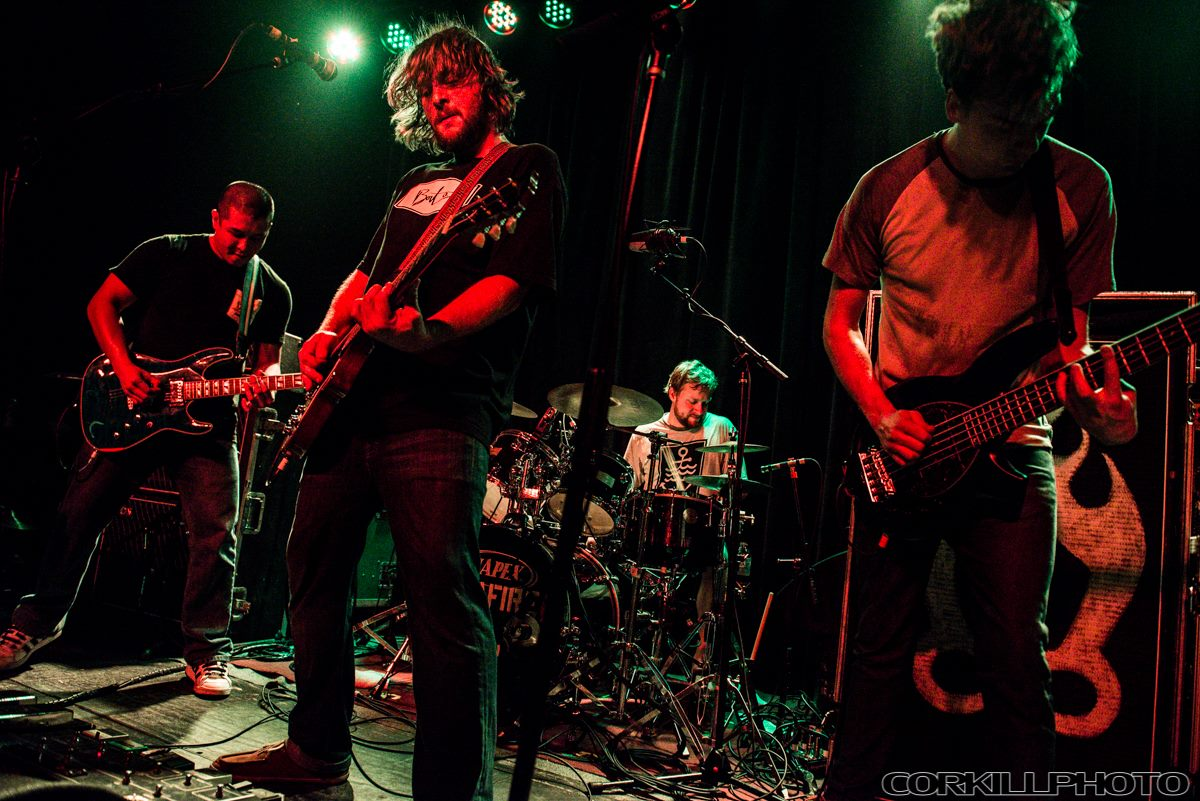
Passafire performing at the Constellation Room in Santa Ana, CA on January 28, 2014

=== Interval EP (2015) ===
The band released their EP, Interval on March 24, 2015, which featured four new songs that continued their sound in new directions into "progressive reggae".

=== Longshot (2017) ===
On May 12, 2017, the band released their sixth album, Longshot, along with a 2-song Longshot B-Sides EP on June 28, 2017, which included bonus track left off the LP.

A year later, Passafire released their latest live album Live in Atlanta on November 2, 2018. In 2019, they were also featured on Sugarshack Sessions Selects Vol. 1 with a live acoustic single of their song "Submersible".

Passafire was featured as one of many reggae bands on Collie Buddz riddim album, Cali Roots Riddim 2021 with their single, "Waste No Time", which was produced by Buddz and mixed by Stick Figure's touring guitarist, producer Johnny Cosmic.

In 2021, Passafire was one of several reggae and punk bands on The House That Bradley Built, a charity compilation honoring Sublime's lead singer Bradley Nowell, helping musicians with substance abuse. They covered Sublime's song "Greatest Hits".

=== Strata (2021) ===
Passafire recorded their seventh album, Strata which released on Flame Guy Records on September 17, 2021. "The first three singles on Strata ("Keepin' On", Sleepless", and "Friends") were written and released before the COVID-19 pandemic. Bowne explains, "The pandemic kinda stopped things. We're all dispersed across the country now so when the pandemic hit we all went back to our home bases. When we were able to get together, we wrote and recorded the last seven songs on the album within a week. We're excited that we're able to tour again and perform our old and new jams. It's touring and sharing our music that keeps our band alive."

=== Remember a Time (2023) ===
On October 20, 2023, Passafire released their 8th full-length studio album titled, Remember a Time. It features 9 tracks which includes musical artists, Brendan Bayliss of Umphrey's McGee, reggae rocker Joe Samba, and rap duo Little Stranger.

== Tours ==
Passafire has been regularly touring, playing shows with bands such as 311 (on the 311 Cruise in 2012 & 2019), Pepper (playing on the LAW Records Tour in October 2008), Rebelution, Matisyahu, Michael Franti and The Wailers. They also toured with Slightly Stoopid at the end of December, 2013.

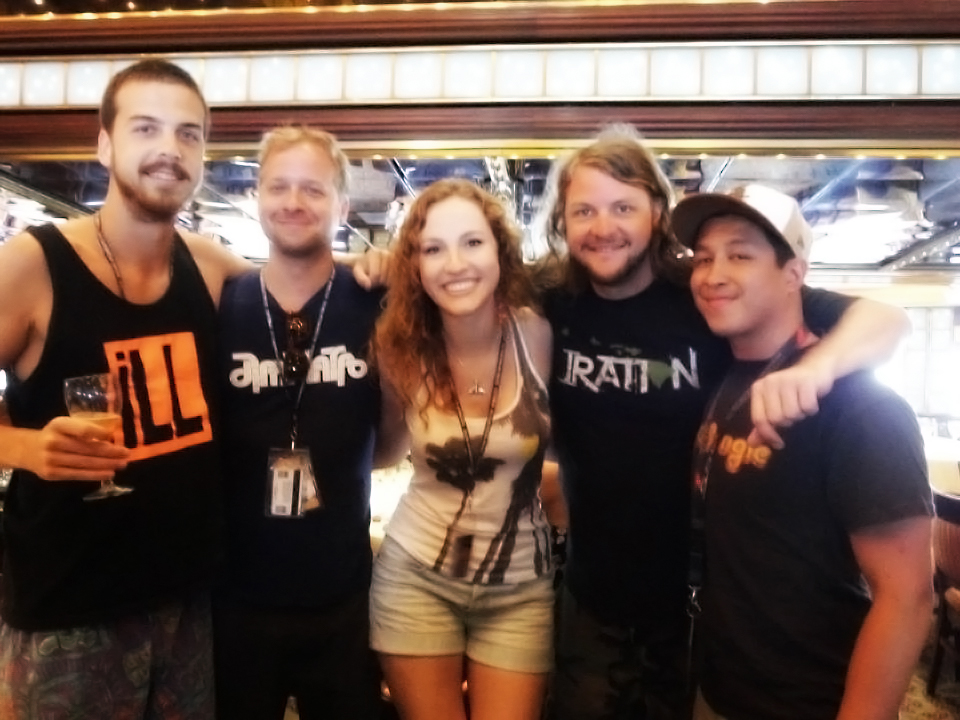
Passafire with a fan on the 311 Cruise in 2012

== Musical style ==
While earlier work mostly fits within the reggae-rock genre, the band's sound has taken on many forms since their self-titled release. Elements such as intricate lead guitar and unexpected instrumental breakdowns are reminiscent of progressive rock. This and other alternative influences are evident as early as their 2007 release, Submersible. In 2011, Start from Scratch explored more organic textures that touched on folk rock. The use of banjos, mandolins, acoustic guitar, and melodica (most notably on the album's title track, performed by new member Mike DeGuzman) were a temporary shift in sound that would influence later releases.

== Other projects ==
In the fall of 2023, Passafire collaborated with Wise Man Brewing in Winston-Salem, North Carolina for a West Coast Pilsner Style Lager called "Stash Pils'" named after their single, "Stash". It's a "classic brew giving it a fresh spin" by dry-hopping it with Citra and Mosaic hops.

== Lineup ==
=== Current members ===
- Ted Bowne – Guitar, Vocals (2003–present)
- Nick Kubley – Drums (2003–present)
- Will Kubley – Bass, Vocals (2006–present) (beginning with the album Submersible).
- Mike DeGuzman – Keyboards (2011–present) (beginning with the album Start From Scratch).

=== Former members ===
- Adam Willis – Keyboards (2003–2010) (on albums Passafire, Submersible, and Everyone On Everynight).
- Tom Heet – Bass (2003–2006) (on album Passafire).

== Discography ==
=== Studio albums ===
Passafire
Year	Album	Label
2006	Passafire	Self-produced
2007	Submersible	LAW Records
2009	Everyone On Everynight	LAW Records
2011	Start From Scratch	FlameGuy Records
2013	Vines	Easy Star Records
2017	Longshot	Easy Star Records
2021	Strata	FlameGuy Records
2023	Remember a Time	FlameGuy Records

=== Live albums/EPs ===
Passafire
Year	Album	Label
2010	Live From The Road Vol. 1	Self-produced
2011	Live From The Road Vol. 2	Self-produced
2012	Remixed From Scratch	FlameGuy Records
2015	Interval (EP)	Easy Star Records
2018	Live In Atlanta	FlameGuy Records

=== Singles ===
Title	Release date	Album
"Feel It"	2006	Passafire
"Workingman's Song"	2006	Passafire
"Rude Boi"	2006	Passafire
"Laquiji"	2006	Passafire
"The Breeze"	2006	Passafire
"Ghost Man"	2007	Submersible
"Kilo"	2007	Submersible
"Unfamiliar"	2007	Submersible
"Mr. Massive"	2007	Submersible
"Leave The Lights On"	2009	Everyone On Everynight
"Here in Front of Me"	2009	Everyone On Everynight
"Keeping in Touch"	2009	Everyone On Everynight
"Carouser"	2009	Everyone On Everynight
"Dimming Sky"	2011	Start From Scratch
"Start From Scratch"	2011	Start From Scratch
"Kiss My Head"	2011	Start From Scratch
"Earthquake"	2013	Vines
"Same Old Story"	2013	Vines
"All in Our Minds"	2013	Vines
"Wheels of Steel"	March 24, 2015	Interval EP
"Finding Me"	March 24, 2015	Interval EP
"Longshot"	2017	Longshot
"Growing Up"	2017	Longshot
"Tacoma"	2017	Longshot
"Rapunzel"	2017	Longshot
"Fireside"	2017	Longshot
"One Blink"	2017	Longshot
"Gone Yesterday"	2017	Longshot
"Drifter"	2017	Longshot
"Would Have Known"	June 28, 2018	Longshot B-Sides
"Call It What It Is"	June 28, 2018	Longshot B-Sides
"Submersible" (Live Acoustic)	May 10, 2019	Sugarshack Sessions Selects Vol. 1
"Keepin' On"	November 1, 2019	Strata (Single)
"Sleepless"	January 31, 2020	Strata (Single)
"Friends"	June 12, 2020	Strata (Single)
"Feel It" (Umberto Echo Dub)	July 3, 2020	(Single)
"Greatest Hits" (Sublime cover)	January 15, 2021	The House That Bradley Built (Single)
"Waste No Time"	May 28, 2021	Cali Roots Riddim 2021 (Single)
"Down That Road"	September 3, 2021	Strata (Single)
"Watchful Eyes" (feat. Joe Samba)	April 26, 2023	Remember a Time (Single)
"Offer"	June 16, 2023	Remember a Time (Single)
"Stash" (feat. Little Stranger)	July 14, 2023	Remember a Time (Single)
"16 Beat"	August 24, 2023	Remember a Time (Single)
"Ocean Floor" (feat. Brendan Bayliss)	October 20, 2023	Remember a Time (Single)

== See also ==
- SCAD Notable Alumni
