= New Kingston (band) =

U.S. reggae group

- Origin: Brooklyn, New York, United States
- Genres: Reggae
- Years active: 2006–present
- Label: Easy Star Records
- Members: Courtney "Fadah P" Panton; Courtney M. Panton; Tahir Panton; Stephen Suckarie
- Website: NewKingstonMusic.com

New Kingston is a progressive reggae group whose members combine their Jamaican heritage with the urban sounds of their New York home, New Kingston are a family band consisting of brothers Tahir, Courtney Jr., and Stephen along with their father, Courtney Panton Sr. A first-generation Jamaican-American, Courtney the elder was active in New York's reggae scene before turning his sons on to the music of their island heritage. Born out of jam sessions in the family's Brooklyn basement, the brothers began their career playing Bob Marley and Earth, Wind & Fire covers at parties and gatherings around the neighborhood. By 2010, they'd become focused on their own writing, which fused R&B, hip-hop, and dancehall with traditional reggae sounds. With each brother writing and offering vocals, Courtney Sr. filled in on bass. Following their self-released debut, In the Streets, New Kingston went on a European tour with rising reggae star Collie Buddz, playing a number of prominent festivals. Their sophomore LP, 2013's Kingston University, earned them a deal with New York label Easy Star Records, which issued their third LP, Kingston City, in early 2015. Boasting an increased production value and guest spots by the Tribal Seeds, The Wailing Souls, Sister Carol, and Sugar Minott, Kingston City raised the band's visibility considerably, topping Billboard's reggae chart upon its release. An EP, Kingston Fyah, arrived in the summer of 2016.

== History ==
=== Formation and early years (2006–2008) ===
New Kingston was first formed in 2006 in Brooklyn, New York. The three primary members are brothers, Tahir Panton on keys, Courtney Panton Jr. on drums, and Stephen Suckarie on guitar, with all three contributing vocals. Their father Courtney Panton Sr, a first-generation American-Jamaican, initially contributed bass. Courtney Sr had also previously played in the New York reggae scene along with artists such as Michael Goldwasser, and had introduced the brothers to reggae music when they were young. New Kingston at first covered songs by artists such as Bob Marley, Earth Wind and Fire, Dennis Brown, and The Whispers. After a time performing in basements and small backyard parties in Brooklyn, the group began to work on original music.

=== First albums and touring (2009–2014) ===
External videos
- New Kingston - "LA LA LA" (Official Video) - July 9, 2013

New Kingston's first album, In the Streets, was self-released in 2010, and fused reggae with genres such as hip hop & Dancehall. The band began touring as the supporting act + band for Collie Buddz. Touring with Buddz they played some of their first overseas shows, and would perform at festivals such as the Reggae on the River, Summer Jam in Germany, and Uppsala Reggae Festival in Sweden. Their music video "Can't Give Up" in 2012 was produced and directed by Raised Fist Propaganda.

Their second album, Kingston University, was released in 2013, with guest artists such as J Boog. After its release, the band continued heavy touring, opening for acts such as The Green (band) & Tribal Seeds. In November 2014, New Kingston signed to Easy Star Records to release their upcoming album Kingston City, becoming the first New York City-based act on the reggae label since Ticklah and Easy Star All-Stars.

=== Kingston City and touring (2015–2016) ===
External videos
- New Kingston - "PROTECT ME" (Official Video) - Sep 9, 2015

Kingston City is the third studio album by the band. Released on January 27, 2015 on Easy Star Records, the album features guest artists such as Tribal Seeds, Sister Carol, The Wailing Souls, Sugar Minott, and Hawaiian artist Kimie Miner. It was mostly recorded at the band's Kingston Studio, while some instrumentation was recorded at E.N. Young's Imperial Sounds. The band produced the majority of the twelve tracks, though Dub Incorporation from France produced two, and Sydney Mills of Steel Pulse produced one as well. Fabian Cooke of Ziggy Marley's work mixed the album.

It reached No. 1 on the Billboard Top Reggae Albums chart the week of February 14, 2015. As of March 29, 2015, the album was still at No. 1. The Pier Magazine gave Kingston City four of five stars, and wrote that the album is "a mix of roots, dancehall, R&B and hip hop influences." In February 2015, the band performed its first headlining show in Brooklyn. The next month New Kingston started their Kingston City Tour of the United States, performing in the Pacific Northwest at the end of March and announcing appearances in the Midwest. The band is also scheduled to appear at Austin Reggae Festival in Texas, Summer Meltdown in California, and Reggae on the Block in Florida. Supporting acts include Kimie Miner and Arise Roots.

=== A Kingston Story: Come From Far (2017) ===
New Kingston, the Brooklyn-based progressive reggae group, released A Kingston Story: Come From Far in 2017, on maverick indie imprint Easy Star Records. This marks the band’s fourth studio album and follows their 2015 breakout release Kingston City (Easy Star), which debuted at #1 on the Billboard Reggae chart followed by international touring and critical praise from tastemakers including Yahoo! Music and Sirius XM.

The opening title track “Come From Far,” premiered by Mass Appeal on July 13, encompasses the band’s live energy as New Kingston’s soulful vocals speak about the band’s journey – where they come from, where they’re at, and where they’re going. Guitarist/vocalist Stephen elaborates, “Everyone has a journey they are on or one that has ended. It all starts somewhere and we are no different. We have ‘come from far’ but ‘look how far we haffi go’.”

== Style and influences ==
New Kingston's music is primarily reggae, though genres such as R&B, roots, dancehall, and hip hop are influential on their sound as well.

== Members ==
Members

- Tahir Panton (2006–present) - keyboards, vocals
- Stephen Suckarie (2006–present) - guitar, vocals
- Courtney Panton Jr. (2006–present) - drums, vocals
- Courtney Panton Sr (2006–present) - bass

Rotating members

- Kristoff Harmon (2016–present) - percussion

== Discography ==
=== Albums ===
Albums by New Kingston
Year	Album title	Release details	Charts
Year	Album title	Release details	US Reggae
2010	In The Streets	Released: Nov 2010; Label: Self-released; Format: CD, digital	—
2013	Kingston University	Released: Feb 5, 2013; Label: Ineffable Records; Format: CD, digital	—
2015	Kingston City	Released: Jan 27, 2015; Label: Easy Star Records (ES1045); Format: CD, digital	1
2017	A Kingston Story: Come From Far	Release date: Sept 1, 2017; Label: Easy Star Records (ES1045); Format: CD, digital	4
"—" denotes a recording that did not chart or was not released in that territory.

=== EPs ===
Albums by New Kingston
Year	Album title	Release details	Charts
Year	Album title	Release details	US Reggae
2011	The Kingston E.P.	Released: July 2011; Label: Self-released; Format: Digital	—
2016	Kingston Fyah	Released: July 29, 2016; Format: CD, digital	13
"—" denotes a recording that did not chart or was not released in that territory.

=== Music videos ===
Yr	Song title	Filmmaker	Video date
2008	"Empress Love"	New Kingston LLC	Apr 5, 2008
2009	"In the Streets"	New Kingston LLC	May 6, 2009
2011	"Love So"	New Kingston LLC	Mar 15, 2011
2012	"Can't Give Up"	Raised Fist Propaganda	Mar 5, 2012
2013	"Life"	Edwin Escobar Films	Feb 4, 2013
2013	"La La La"	Edwin Escobar Films	July 9, 2013
2015	"Today"	Dameon Gayle	Mar 30, 2015
2015	"Protect Me"	Edwin Escobar Films	Sep 8, 2015
2015	"Honorable"	IFE	Dec 10, 2015
2016	"Mystery Babylon" feat. Maad T Ray & E.N Young	Damian Mancia	Feb 11, 2016
2016	"Kingston Fyah"	Rob Driscal	July 26, 2016
2016	"Coming Right Away"	Rob Driscal	Aug 22, 2016
2016	"Ready"	Edwin Escobar Films	Sep 27, 2016
2016	"i"	Rob Driscal	Dec 1, 2016
