= Destroy Babylon =

American band

- photo by Lara Woolfson

Background information
- Also known as: DB, The Culture Pirates, Flying Vipers
- Origin: Hudson, New Hampshire, United States
- Genres: Dub, punk, reggae
- Years active: 2001–present
- Labels: Music ADD, Jump Up! Records
- Members: John Beaudette; Marc Beaudette; Rob Carmichael; Sean Carmichael; Casey Gruttadauria; Kellee Webb
- Past members: Chris Moran; Jon Mercer
- Website: destroybabylon.com

Destroy Babylon are a Boston, Massachusetts based band originally from Hudson, New Hampshire. Formed in 2001, their music is influenced by a wide range of styles, including post-punk, dub, Jamaican backing bands, and 1960's psych and prog rock.

== History ==
=== 2001-2008 ===
Twin brothers John and Marc Beaudette formed Destroy Babylon with their friend Chris Moran during the summer of 2001 in Hudson, New Hampshire, before attending college. The band name was taken from a song by the Bad Brains. They began writing music influenced by the energy and DIY ethics of punk rock and the rhythms of Roots reggae and Dub music. The band relocated to Boston in 2005 and released their first full-length, Oligopuzzled, in 2006 on their own Music ADD label. Rob Carmichael joined the band on lead guitar and they released two EPs, sEParation and The Shadow Army. Jon Mercer then joined the band on keys and live dub effects, and after some national touring, released a live full-length, Backyard Babylon.

=== 2009-2010 ===
Destroy Babylon gained national airplay with their 2009 single, Culture Pirates, released on a 7" vinyl record packaged with a 28-page art book. In January 2009, the band started a "Dub of the Month" series, releasing a new song once a month for a full year. Each song debuted on WMBR's Pipeline! show. The 12 songs were collected and released as Dub of Ages, Vol. 1 in 2010. DB toured and supported the likes of Lee "Scratch" Perry, The Wailers, Eek-A-Mouse, Bad Brains frontman H.R., plus contemporaries like The Slackers, The Aggrolites, Dub Trio, and Westbound Train, among others.

=== 2011-2014 ===
The band worked with Craig Welsch (John Brown's Body, 10 Foot Ganja Plant) on their latest full-length, Long Live the Vortex. Both Jon Mercer and Chris Moran left the band before the album was released. John Beaudette switched to bass and Casey Gruttadauria joined on keys. In August the band completed a short tour with the Easy Star All-Stars. In 2012, Kellee Webb became a full-time singer and percussionist, Rob's brother Sean Carmichael took over on bass (moving John back to guitar), and the band typically performs as a 6-piece.

=== 2015-Present ===
In the summer of 2015, the band announced a side project, Flying Vipers, and released a cassette tape of low fidelity instrumental dub reggae. The band followed up with another tape in 2016.

== Discography ==
- Long Live the Vortex (2011)
- Dub of Ages Vol. 2 (2010)
- Dub of Ages Vol. 1 (2010)
- Culture Pirates (2009)
- Backyard Babylon: Live in Queens (2008)
- The Shadow Army (2008)
- sEParation (2007)
- Oligopuzzled (2006)
