= Flying Vipers =

American dub reggae band

- Origin: Waltham, Massachusetts, United States
- Genres: Dub, reggae
- Years active: 2015–present
- Labels: Easy Star Records, Music ADD
- Members: John Beaudette; Marc Beaudette; Zack Brines; Kellee Webb
- Website: flyingvipers.com

Flying Vipers are a Boston based dub reggae band. The group was formed by twin brothers John and Marc Beaudette and Zack Brines from the Kings of Nuthin', originally as a side project of Destroy Babylon. Jay Champany produced the group's first two releases, both recorded and mixed direct to cassette tape.

In 2024, the band released "Show Me", their first single for Easy Star Records.

== Line up ==
- John Beaudette – bass, guitar, melodica
- Marc Beaudette – drums, percussion
- Zack Brines – organ, piano, clavinet
- Kellee Webb – vocals, percussion

== Discography ==
- The Green Tape (2015)
- The Copper Tape (2016)
- The Shadow Tape (2017)
- Cuttings (2020)
- Off World (2025)
