= Gentleman's Dub Club =

British dub band

- Gentleman's Dub Club performing at Outlook Festival in Croatia

Background information
- Origin: Leeds, Yorkshire, England
- Genres: Dub, dubstep, ska, dubtronica, reggae, reggae fusion, 2-tone
- Years active: 2006–present
- Labels: Ranking Records, Easy Star Records
- Members: Jonathan Scratchley (vocals); Toby Davies (bass guitar, keyboards, vocals); Luke Allwood (keyboards, vocals); Matt Roberts (trumpet); Kieren Gallager (alto sax); Nick Tyson (guitar); Niall Lavelle (percussion, samples); Tommy Evans (drums); Doug Hunt (Engineer)
- Past members: Ed Thomas (keys); Harry Devenish (engineer)
- Website: gentlemansdubclub.com

Gentleman's Dub Club are a British dub band, originating from Leeds, Yorkshire.

== Biography ==
Having built a reputation for delivering energetic live shows, the group has played for crowds from Goa to Glastonbury, Bestival, V Festival, Secret Garden Party, France's Telerama Dub Festival, Poland's Ostróda Reggae Festival, and Croatia's Outlook Festival. Their records remain within the top 40 of the iTunes store album reggae charts since release, hailing support from some of the UK's most prominent underground representatives including Huw Stephens (BBC Radio 1), Rob Da Bank (BBC Radio 1), David Rodigan (BBC Radio 1Xtra), and Don Letts (BBC Radio 6 Music).

Gentleman's Dub Club have supported a number of established artists such as Roots Manuva, The Streets, The Wailers, Busy Signal, U-Roy, and Finlay Quaye. Their debut album, FOURtyFOUR, was released on 18 October 2013 on Ranking Records.

Their second album The Big Smoke was released in 2015. On 1 February 2017 Gentleman's Dub Club announced their third album, titled Dubtopia, would be released on 7 April. At the same time, the band also launched the Dubtopia tour, starting in Falmouth, Cornwall, UK on 17 February and ending at Festival Insolent in Lanester, France on 22 April.

== Discography ==
=== Studio albums ===
Year	Album details	Peak chart positions
Year	Album details	UK
2009	Members Only EP: Released: 23 March 2009; Label: Ranking Records; Formats: CD, digital download	-
2012	Open Your Eyes EP: Released: 12 March 2012; Label: Ranking Records; Formats: CD, digital download	-
2013	FOURtyFOUR: Released: 18 October 2013; Label: Ranking Records; Formats: CD, digital download	-
2015	The Big Smoke: Released: 13 November 2015; Label: Easy Star Records; Formats: CD, digital download, vinyl	-
2017	Dubtopia: Released: 7 April 2017; Label: Easy Star Records; Formats: CD, digital download, vinyl	-
2018	Pound for Pound (vs. The Next Men): Released: 22 June 2018; Label: Pound for Pound; Formats: CD, digital download, vinyl	
2019	Lost in Space: Released: 25 January 2019; Label: Easy Star Records; Formats: CD, digital download, vinyl	
2021	Down to Earth: Released: 12 March 2021; Label: Easy Star Records; Formats: CD, digital download, vinyl	
