= Pressure (reggae musician) =

Delyno Busspipe
- Birth name: Delyno Brown
- Born: 5 August 1981 (age 43); St. Thomas, U.S. Virgin Islands
- Genres: Reggae
- Years active: 2005–present
- Labels: Busspipe
- Website: pressurebusspipe.com

Delyno Brown (born August 5, 1981), better known as Pressure or Pressure Busspipe, is a reggae musician from Saint Thomas, U.S. Virgin Islands.

He gained his early experience working on the Star Lion sound system in the late 1990s.

His debut album, The Pressure Is On, was produced by Dean Pond and released in 2005. He had a hit in Jamaica in 2007 with a remixed version of "Love and Affection", a song originally recorded for Pond but updated by producer Don Corleon. Corleon produced an album of the same name.

His third album was called Coming Back For You, again produced by Pond and released in 2009.

Pressure is known for his commitment to the Rastafari movement.

His fourth album, Africa Redemption, was released in December 2012. He worked on the album with producer Trevor "Baby G" James in Jamaica and Damian and Stephen Marley in Miami.

After being a victim of gun crime and in response to the rise in violent crime in the islands, Pressure Busspipe organized a peace concert in St. Thomas in August 2013.

Fifth album The Sound was released in 2014.

His 2016 album Red Rose reached the top ten of the Billboard Top Reggae Albums chart.

In November 2019 he released the album Rebel With a Cause.

== Discography ==
- The Pressure Is On (2005), Tsuni
- Love and Affection (2007), Don Corleon
- Coming Back for You (2009), Rymshot Productions
- The Sound (2014), I Grade/BussPipe
- Africa Redemption (2014), BussPipe/Yard Vibes
- Red Rose (2016), Jalpo/Busspipe - US Reggae no. 8
- Rebel With a Cause (2019), Zojak Worldwide
