= The Expanders =

American roots reggae band

- Origin: Los Angeles, California, U.S.
- Genres: Roots reggae, Rocksteady
- Years active: 2003–present
- Label: Easy Star
- Members: John Asher; John Butcher; Roy Fishell; Chiquis Lozoya; Devin Morrison (aka Man Like Devin)
- Past members: Evan Heins
- Website: www.theexpanders.com

The Expanders are an American roots reggae band from Los Angeles, California.

== Biography ==
=== Formation and Self-titled album ===
The Expanders formed in Los Angeles, California in the summer of 2003. The band's sound is influenced by vintage 1970s and early 1980s Jamaican reggae groups, with three-part vocal harmonies, conscious songwriting, and an indie-DIY spirit.

The Expanders self-titled debut album was recorded from 2006 to 2010 and was released in 2011 on Man-Like Records. It captured the retro Jamaican sound they hoped to create by recording at Killion Sound studio in Los Angeles, California alongside sound engineer Jay Bonner, the original bass player for The Aggrolites.

=== First covers album ===
In 2012, the Expanders released a covers album titled, Old Time Something Come Back Again, Vol. 1, a free 13-track covers album of rare Jamaican songs. It was released on Jump Up! Records.

=== Hustling Culture ===
The Expanders returned to L.A.'s Killion Sound studio between 2012 and 2014 to record their third studio album (second original song album) Hustling Culture. Recordings were done entirely on analogue tape.

In 2015, the band signed with New York City's Easy Star Records, who released Hustling Culture on June 26, 2015. They explained, "'Hustling Culture' is the band coming into its own with our songwriting and musicianship." The album debuted #1 on the Billboard's chart of Top Reggae Albums.

=== Second covers album ===
On September 29, 2017, The Expanders released their second covers album and fourth studio album, Old Time Something Come Back Again, Vol. 2 via Easy Star Records. The album was their second release to debut #1 on the Billboard chart of Top Reggae Albums. The second volume features The Expanders versions of songs by Burning Spear, The Gladiators, The Ethiopians, The Itals, Little Roy, Yabby You, among other reggae artists.

=== Change in the lineup ===
In 2018, there was a change in the lineup when rhythm guitarist Devin Morrison left the band, which was an amicable departure to explore other musical endeavors. Along with the remaining members, the band added Evan Heins from Ital Vibes and Prime Livity on bass. They also switched Chiquis Lozoya from bass to lead vocals rhythm guitar.

=== Collaborations and riddim albums ===
Also in 2018, The Expanders collaborated with renowned Grammy Award-winning producer Walshy Fire for two separate riddim albums of their tracks "Top Shelf" and "Thanks For Life." The albums feature vocals from reggae artists like Cocoa Tea, Randy Valentine, Queen Omega, Fyakin, and others.

The Expanders collaborated with Kyle McDonald of Slightly Stoopid on a track titled "Sweet & Slow" which was released on November 22, 2019.

In the summer of 2020, The Expanders were asked to record two covers of classic Toots & Maytals songs in anticipation of a month-long tribute to Toots Hibbert on Rootfire. However, directly after they finished the recordings, Toots Hibbert died at 77 years old after contacting COVID-19. The band released their two-track tribute EP Two For Toots on October 23, 2020. It featured covers "True Love" and "Love Is Gonna To Let Me Down". The proceeds from the album was donated to Toots' family.

On November 6, 2020, The Expanders once again teamed up Walshy Fire for another riddim album of their title track "Peace of Love". The album featured artists such as Buzzrock, Blessed, Hanali, Tóke, Promise No Promises and more reggae artists.

== Lineup ==
=== Current band members ===
- Devin Morrison aka Man Like Devin – Guitar, Lead Vocals (2011–2018, 2026–Present)
- John Butcher – Lead Guitar, Backing Vocals (2003–Present)
- Chiquis Lozoya – Bass Guitar, Backing Vocals (2003–Present)
- John Asher – Drums, Backing Vocals (2003–Present)
- Roy Fishell – Keyboard (2014–Present)

=== Past band members ===
- Evan Heins – Bass (2018–2022)

== Discography ==
=== Studio albums ===
The Expanders Chart History
Year	Album	Label	Billboard peak
2011	The Expanders	Man-Like Records	—
2012	Old Time Something Come Back Again, Vol. 1 (Covers Album)	Jump Up! Records	—
2015	Hustling Culture	Easy Star Records	#1
2017	Old Time Something Come Back Again, Vol. 2 (Covers Album)	Easy Star Records	#1

=== Riddim albums ===
The Expanders Chart History
Year	Album	Label	Billboard peak
2018	Walshy Fire and The Expanders Present Thanks For Life	Self-produced	—
2018	Walshy Fire and The Expanders Present Top Shelf Riddim	Self-produced	—
2020	Walshy Fire and The Expanders Present Peace of Love Riddim	Self-produced	—

=== Singles ===
Title	Release date	Album
"Race Is Run"	2011	The Expanders
"Snow Beast"	2011	The Expanders
"Merciless Deeds" (feat. Alex Desert & Deston Berry of Hepcat)	2011	The Expanders
"Something Wrong"	2011	The Expanders
"Turtle Racing" (feat. Jah Faith)	2011	The Expanders
"Moving Along"	2011	The Expanders
"Evilous Number"	2011	The Expanders
"Careful"	2011	The Expanders
"Down In The Valley"	2011	The Expanders
"Follow It"	2011	The Expanders
"Gone Away"	2011	The Expanders
"Thanks For Life"	2015	Hustling Culture
"World of Happiness"	2015	Hustling Culture
"Uptown Set"	2015	Hustling Culture
"Hustling Culture"	2015	Hustling Culture
"Iron Throne"	2015	Hustling Culture
"Piece of Love"	2015	Hustling Culture
"Reggae Pops" (feat. Dan Hastie)	2015	Hustling Culture
"Flesh and Bone"	2015	Hustling Culture
"Too Late"	2015	Hustling Culture
"People Business"	2015	Hustling Culture
"Struggler's Time" (Ghetto Connection cover)	2017	Old Time Something Come Back Again, Vol. 2
"Blood Morning"	February 16, 2018	(Single)
"Top Shelf"	2018	Top Shelf Riddim
"We Deya"	2018	Top Shelf Riddim
"Roots Daughter Flex"	2018	Top Shelf Riddim
"Medical Marijuana"	2018	Top Shelf Riddim
"Rubble Rebel"	2018	Walshy Fire and The Expanders Present Thanks For Life
"Don't Waste My Time"	2018	Walshy Fire and The Expanders Present Thanks For Life
"Sweet and Slow" (feat. Kyle McDonald of Slightly Stoopid)	November 6, 2019	(Single)
"Herb Dream"	2020	Peace of Love Riddim
"The Wall"	2020	Peace of Love Riddim
"Scarlet Begonias" (Grateful Dead/Sublime cover)	September 4, 2020	The House That Bradley Built (Single)
"I Will Love You Girl"	May 28, 2021	Cali Roots Riddim 2021 (Single)
