= Ossie Dellimore =

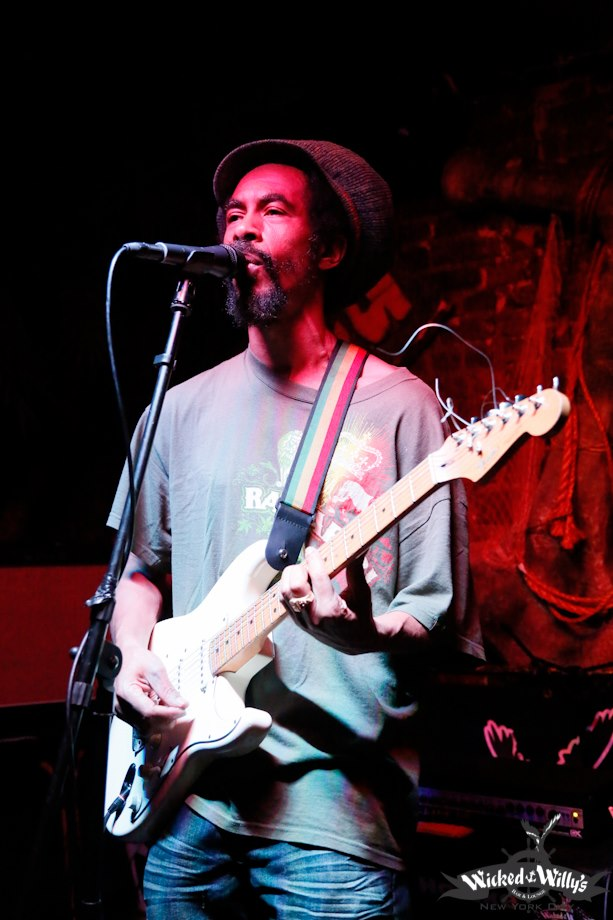

Background information
- Born: St. Vincent
- Origin: Brooklyn, New York, United States
- Genres: Roots reggae
- Years active: Late 1980s–present
- Labels: AB, Skank

Osbert A. "Ossie" Dellimore is a roots reggae singer born in St. Vincent who has lived in Brooklyn since 1981. He has so far released two albums, his first in 2000 and his second in 2010.

== Biography ==
Born in St. Vincent and the Grenadines, Dellimore moved to Brooklyn, New York, in 1981 where he went on to establish himself as a reggae singer and musician. He won a Caribbean Amateur Night at the Apollo Theater in 1990, but after several years of performing locally got his big break in the late 1990s when he recorded with the Easy Star All Stars, contributing "Time Has Come" to the Easy Star Volume One album. His debut album, Freedom's Journal, was released in 2000, featuring his band the Soldiers of Justice, with critics drawing comparisons with Peter Tosh.

Freedom's Journal was reissued by Skank Records in 2004 with bonus tracks. His second album, Reggae Music, was released in 2010 on Skank Records.

== Discography ==
- Freedom's Journal (2000), AB
- Reggae Music (2010), Skank
