= Sister Carol =

Jamaican singer (b. 1959)

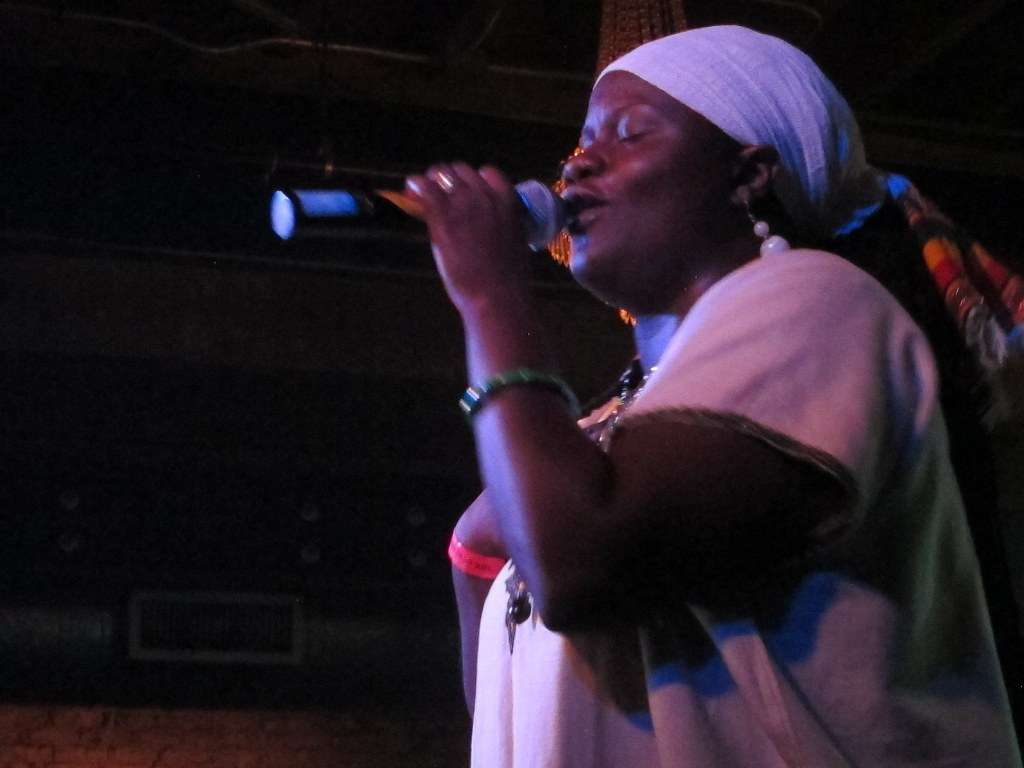
- Sister Carol performing in 2012

Background information
- Also known as: Black Cinderella, Mother Culture
- Born: Carol Theresa East; 15 January 1959 (age 67)
- Origin: Kingston, Jamaica
- Genres: Reggae, dancehall
- Occupation: Singer
- Years active: 1983 – present
- Labels: RAS, Heartbeat, Black Cinderella
- Website: www.sistercarol.com

Carol Theresa East (born 15 January 1959), known by her stage name of Sister Carol, is a Jamaican reggae recording artist. She has used many other stage names, including Black Cinderella (also the name of her record label) and Mother Culture.

== Early life and education ==
Carol Theresa East was born in the Denham Town district of West Kingston. Her father, Howard East, was a Senior Engineer with Radio Jamaica and contributed to recording sessions as Studio One. When she was 14-years-old, her family moved to Brooklyn, New York.

She earned a degree in education from the City College of New York in 1981, the same year she gave birth to her first child. Around that time she met Brigadier Jerry, a Jamaican DJ, who encouraged her to try DJ chatting in Jamaican dancehall style, rather than singing.

== Career ==
After winning competitions in New York and Jamaica, she toured with The Meditations. Her first album, Liberation for Africa, was released in 1983, as a limited edition on the Jamaican SG label. The 1984 album Black Cinderella established her. She formed her own record label, also called Black Cinderella. Jah Disciple followed in 1989.

East has appeared in the Jonathan Demme movies Something Wild (1986), Married to the Mob (1988), and Rachel Getting Married (2008). Demme featured East's songs in Ricki and the Flash (2015).

== Personal life ==
In the 2000s she returned to Jamaica, living in St. Ann. Her daughter Nakeeba Amaniyea is a deejay.

== Discography ==
- Liberation for Africa (1983), Serious Gold
- Black Cinderella (1984), Jah Life
- Jah Disciple (1989), RAS
- Mother Culture (1991), RAS
- Call Mi Sister Carol (1994), Heartbeat
- Lyrically Potent (1996), Heartbeat
- Potent Dub (1997), Heartbeat
- Isis - The Original Rasta Womb-man (1999), Tuff Gong
- Direct Hit! (2001), Catapult
- Empressive (2003), M10
- 1Derful Words (2006), Black Cinderella
- Togetherness (2012) - Sister Carol & Friends
- Live No Evil (2014), Black Cinderella
