= Groundation =

American roots reggae band

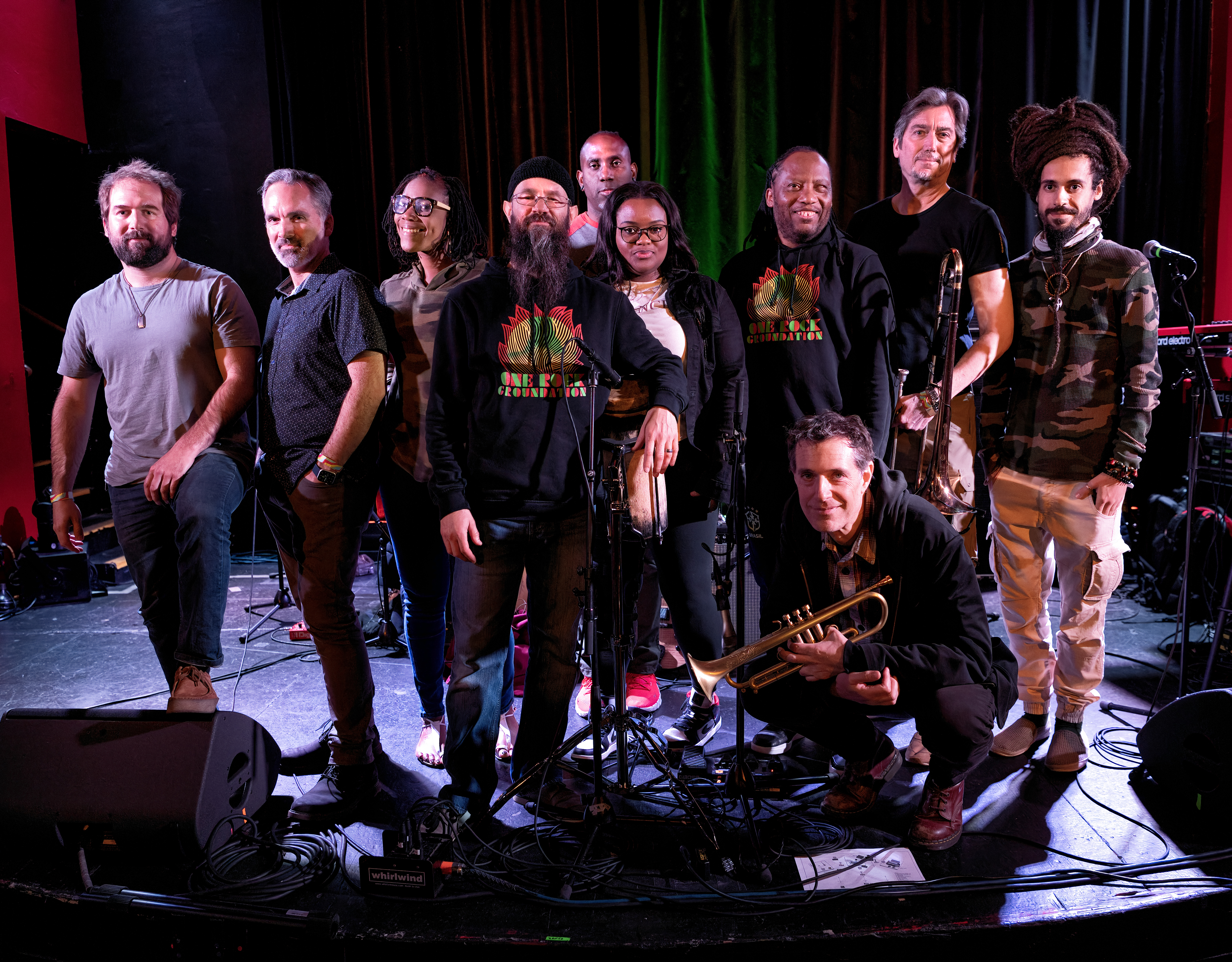
- Lee Abel captures the group GROUNDATION in San Francisco 2023

Background information
- Origin: California, United States
- Genres: Roots reggae, Jazz fusion, Dub
- Years active: 1998–present
- Label: Young Tree
- Members: Harrison Stafford; Eduardo Gross; Isaiah Palmer; Zach Morillo; Roger Cox; Jeff Cressman; Darren Johnston; Pau Dangla Valls
- Website: www.groundation.com

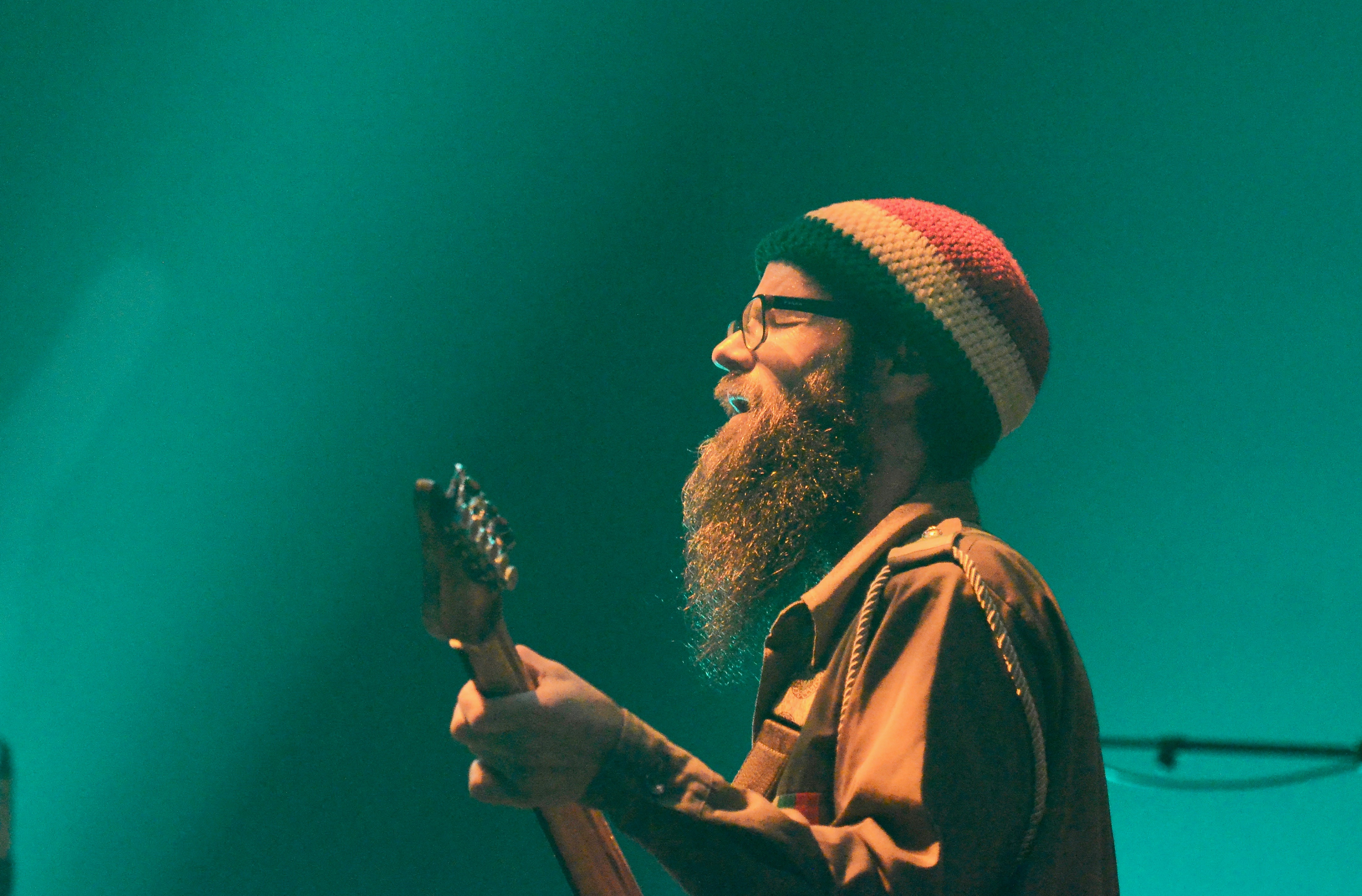
Groundation in concert in Brussels October 20th 2018

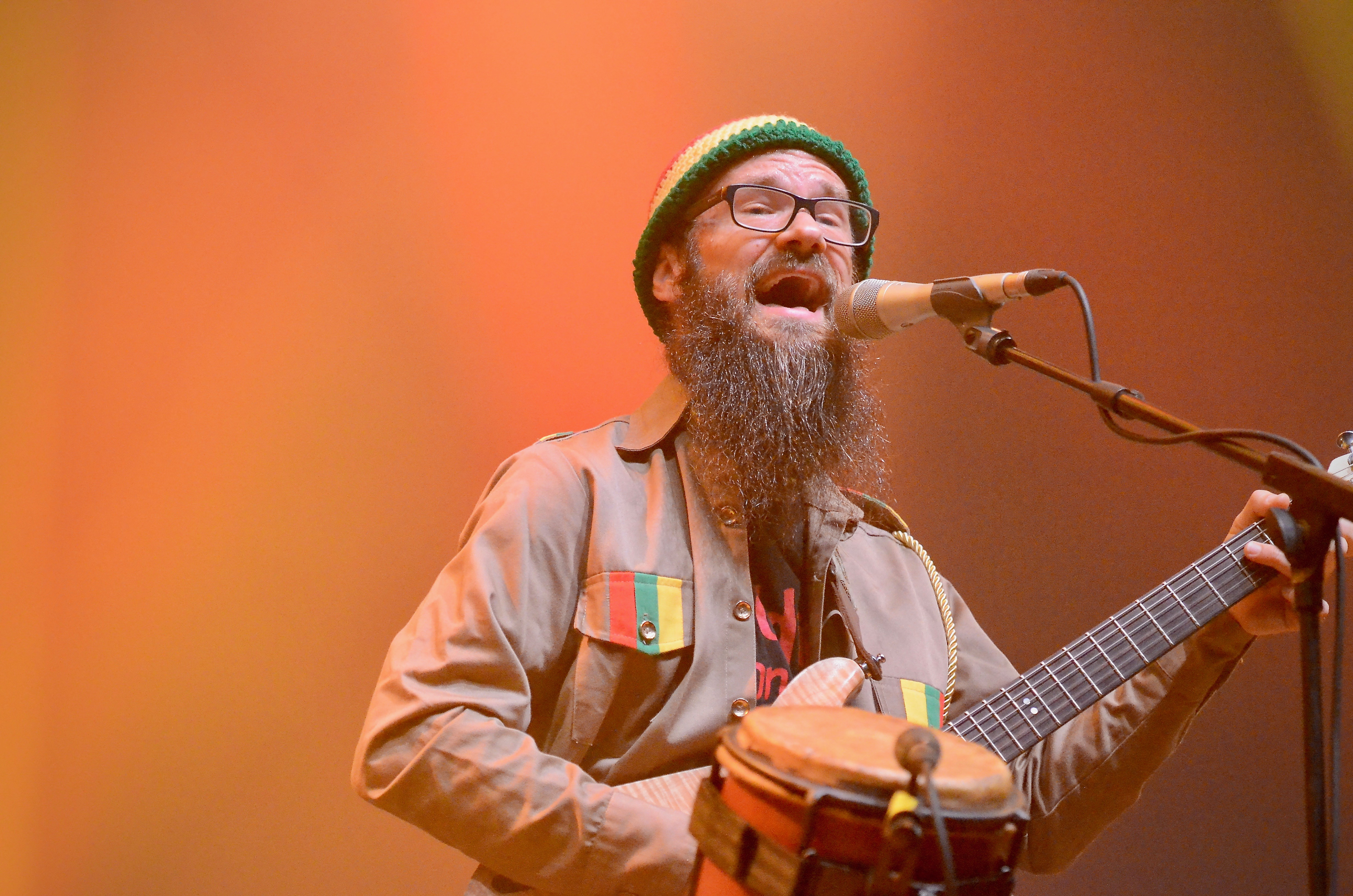
Groundation in concert in Brussels October 20th 2018

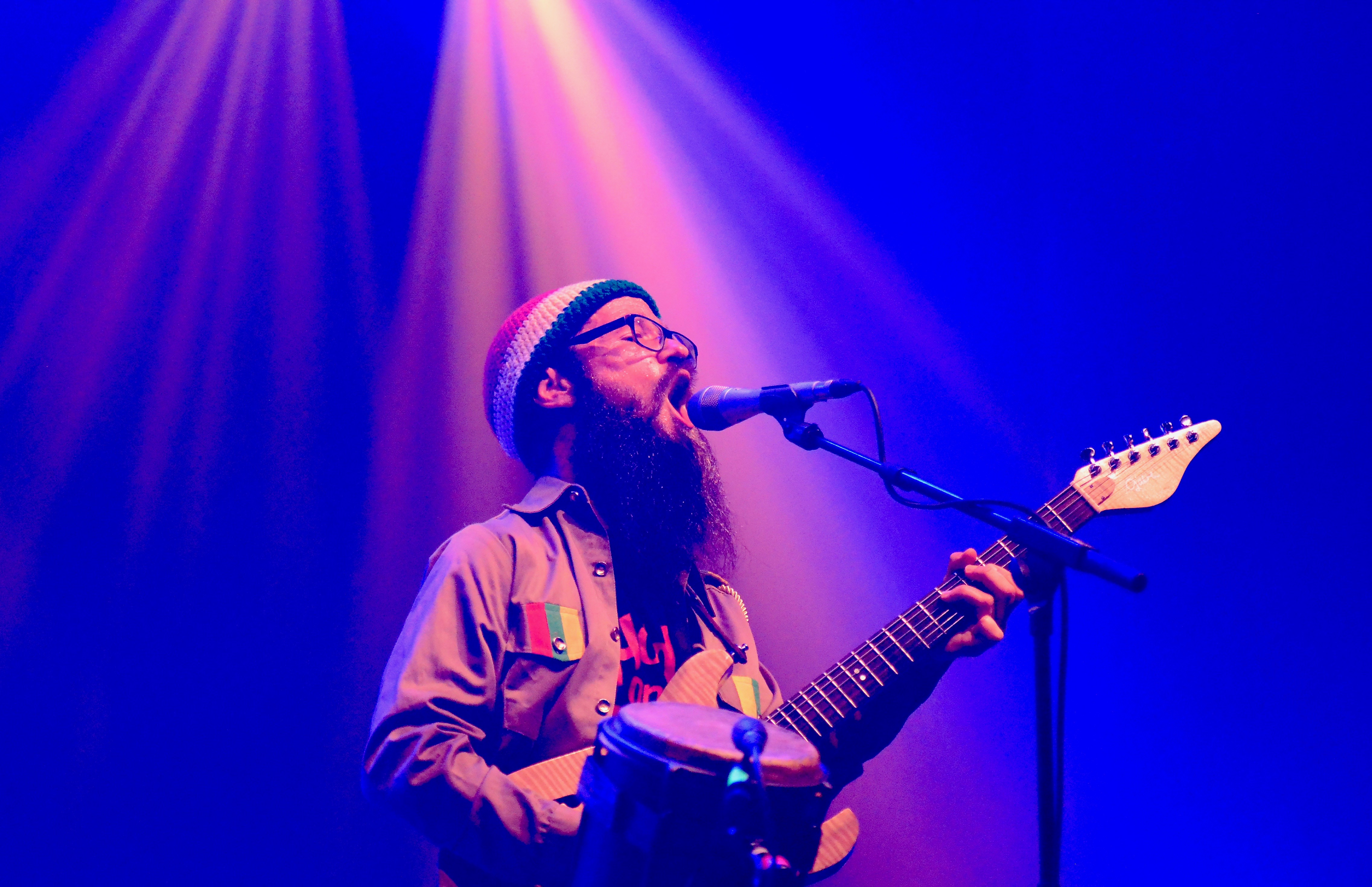
Groundation in concert in Brussels October 20th 2018

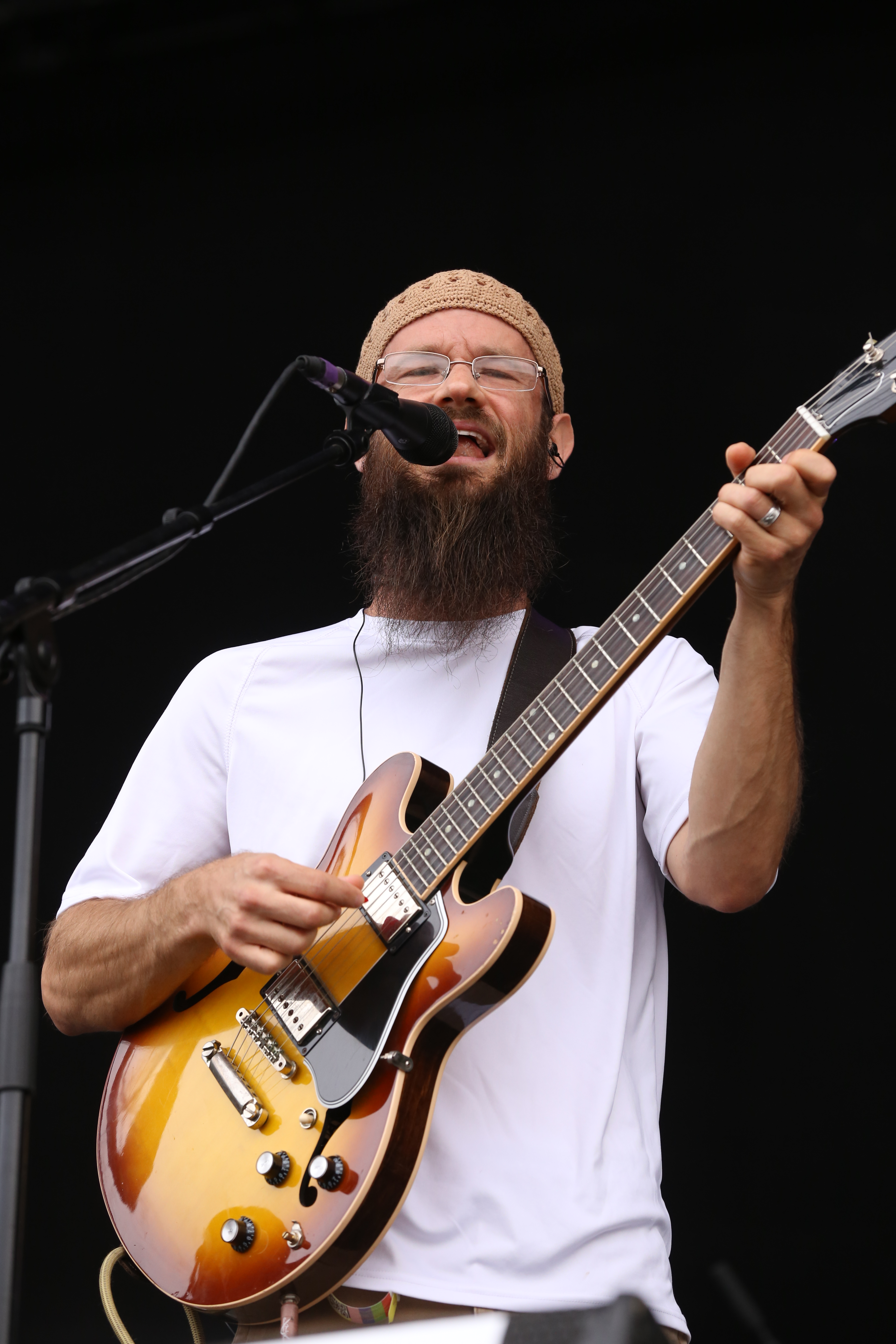
Harrison Stafford (2013)

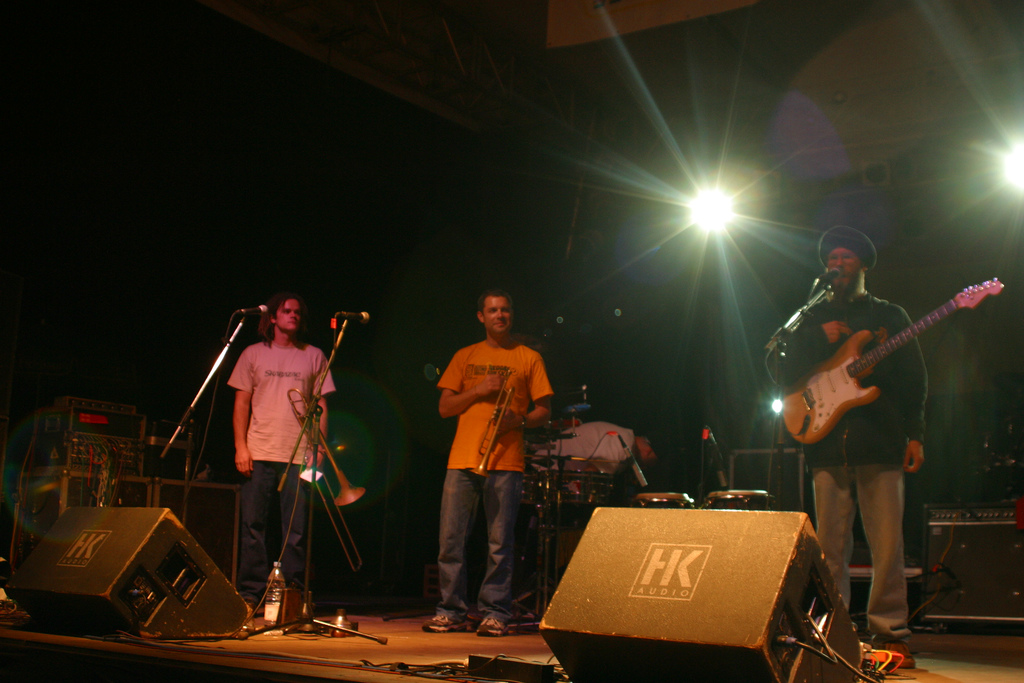
Groundation performing at the 2006 Jamaican Reggae Festival in Kandel, Germany

Groundation is an American roots reggae band with jazz and dub influences, from Sonoma County in Northern California. It is named for Rastafarian ceremony of Grounation.

== History ==
Created in 1998 by Harrison Stafford, Groundation began on the campus of Sonoma State University's Jazz Program. Harrison formed the initial group by calling in bassist Ryan Newman, keyboardist Marcus Urani, and drummer Jason Bodlovitch, who were fellow students under the Jazz Performance department. Between 1999 and 2001, Harrison Stafford taught the first course on the history of reggae music at the university. In 1999, Stafford teamed up with Kris Dilbeck to found Young Tree Records and release Groundation's debut album Young Tree. "Groundation" comes from the Rasta term "Grounation".

Grounation Day is an important Rastafarian holy day celebrated April 21, which commemorates Haile Selassie's first visit to Jamaica in 1966. Grounation Day is second in importance to Coronation Day, which is celebrated November 2, in honor Haile Selassie's Coronation in 1930.

In 1999, while in Jamaica, Harrison met the legendary engineer Jim Fox, who was involved with the production of many of RAS Records’ most iconic releases. Fox remastered both Young Tree and Each One Teach One and recorded Hebron Gate (2002), the album that launched Groundation to international acclaim. Fox has continued working with the band on every subsequent release, helping to shape their sound on We Free Again (2004), Upon The Bridge (2006), Here I Am (2009), Building An Ark (2012), and A Miracle (2014) creating a catalog of genre-bending, deep, progressive roots reggae music. Similarly, Groundation's artwork had a consistent look and feel, in collaboration with Stafford's childhood friend, Giovanni Maki, creating all visual designs from the very beginning.

The band creates an altogether new reggae sound, featuring swirling, jazz/funk inspired horns, stout Latin and African based poly-rhythmics, and soulful harmony vocals. Their concerts utilize live improvisation, in classic jazz fashion, and are renowned for their high energy, communion-type atmosphere. Having gained international notoriety for their progressive fusion style, Groundation regularly plays at major international festivals like Summerjam.

The band uses analog instruments and recording equipment rather than digital, with Stafford explaining "No digital, we don't work with synthesisers. Just like in the 1970s we stick to that format."

Through the years, Groundation has performed in over 35 countries on 5 continents. The band, which had a number of personnel changes over the years, but always built around Harrison Stafford's leadership, continued to bring reggae into new worlds, with their studio album The Next Generation (2018) opening with a full jazz big band (featuring 12 horn players). This album beat out Ziggy Marley and others to win Reggae.fr's “Best Roots Reggae Album of 2018,” voted on by over 16,000 media members, musicians, producers, and fans.

In 2022 Groundation released their 10th studio album One Rock. They addressed issues of selfishness and greed emerged during COVID-19 pandemic throughout the record, and paid tribute to the victims and honoring the many reggae legends who had passed away since 2020. The group also honored the "veterans" on this album. For One Rock, they brought together the reggae vocal groups Israel Vibration, The Abyssinians, and The Congos.

== Lineup ==
=== Members ===
- Harrison Stafford – vocals, guitar
- Isaiah Palmer - Bass player
- Zach Morillo - Drummer
- Eduardo Gross - Guitarist
- Roger Cox- Saxophone
- Jeff Cressman - Trombone
- Darren Johnston - Trumpet
- Pau Dangla Valls - Keyboardist

=== Former members ===
- Matt Jenson – b3, keyboards
- Will Blades – b3, keyboards
- Marcus Urani – b3, keyboards
- Ryan Newman – bass
- David Chachere – trumpet
- Rich Armstrong – trumpet
- Craig Berletti – trumpet Keyboards
- Te Kanawa Haereiti aka. Rufus – drums
- Jake Shandling – drums
- Kim Pommell – chorus
- Sherida Sharpe – chorus
- Nicholas Daniel Wlodarczyk – trombone
- Jason Robinson – sax, flute
- Paul Spina – drums (from December 2001 to July 2008; credited as a guest on some more recent albums).
- James Stafford – drums (on the first two albums)
- Shawna Anderson – chorus (from 1999 to 2004)
- Adaria Armstrong - chorus (2004)
- Ikesha Johnson – chorus (Upon The Bridge)
- Benjamin Krames – congas, timbales, percussion (in 2007, during Mingo's break)
- Kelsey Howard – trombone (from 2000 to 2012)
- Kerry-Ann Morgan – chorus (Upon The Bridge, Building An Ark)
- Stephanie Wallace – chorus (Here I Am)
- Mingo Lewis Jr. – congas, timbales, percussion (2003–2013)

== Discography ==
=== Studio albums ===
- 1999: Young Tree (Remastered in 2002)
- 2001: Each One Teach One
- 2003: Hebron Gate
- 2004: We Free Again
- 2005: Dub Wars
- 2006: Upon the Bridge
- 2008: Rockamovya (Groundation's Stafford, Newman, and Urani project featuring Will Bernard and Leroy "Horsemouth" Wallace),
- 2009: Here I Am
- 2011: Gathering of the Elders
- 2011: We Dub Again (Dub Remixes of We Free Again)
- 2012: Building an Ark
- 2014: A Miracle
- 2016: Each One Dub One
- 2018: The Next Generation
- 2020: The Next Generation Live
- 2022: One Rock
- 2025: Candle Burning
