= California Roots Music and Arts Festival =

Annual music and art festival

Coordinates: 36.5946°N 121.8625°W

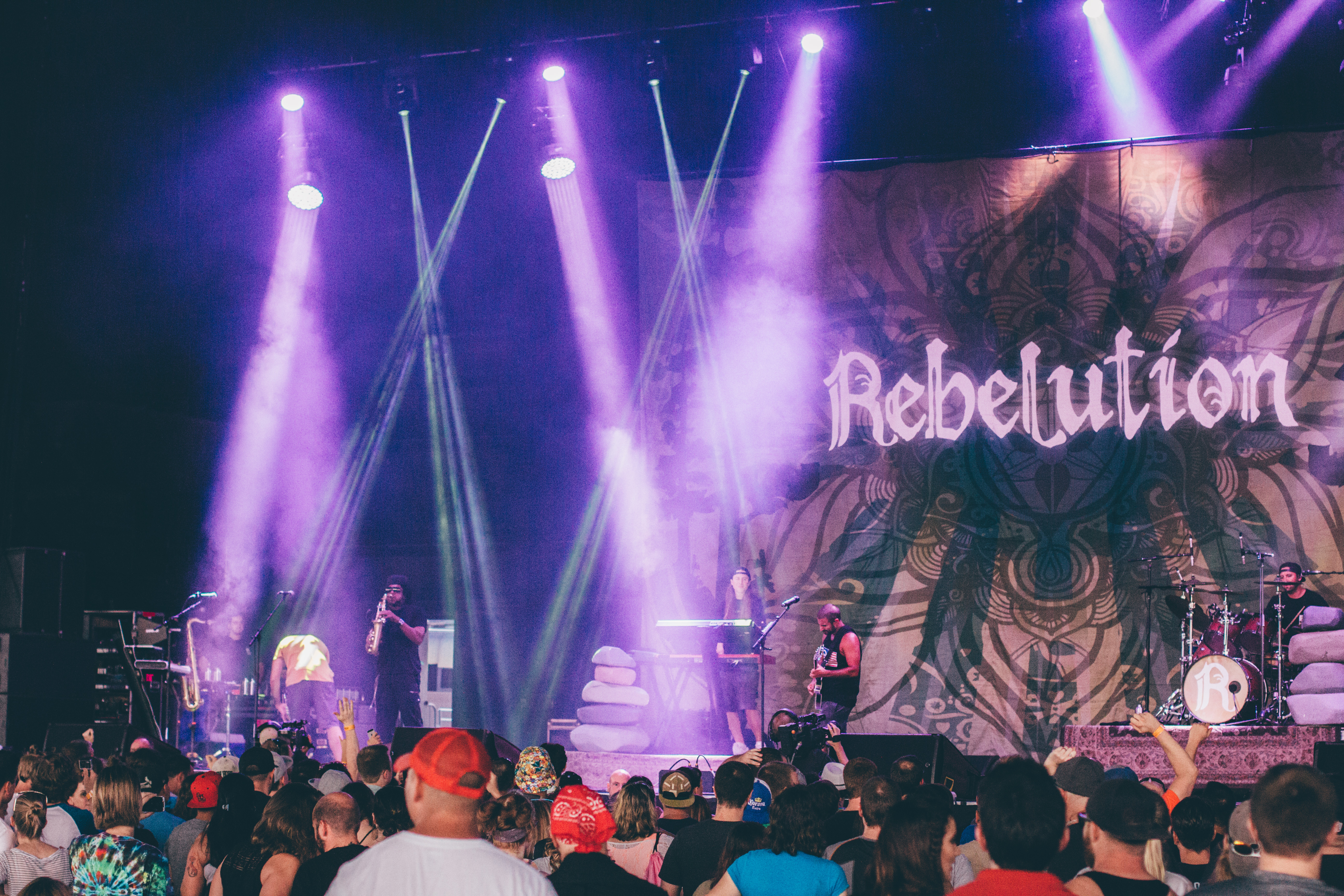
- Rebelution performing at Cali Roots
- Genre: Reggae, Roots Reggae, Reggae rock, Folk, Hip-hop
- Dates: May (last weekend)
- Locations: Monterey County Fairgrounds, Monterey, California
- Years active: 2010–Present
- Founders: Jeff Monser
- Attendance: 13,000 (per day)
- Website: Official website

The California Roots Music and Art Festival (Cali Roots) is an American annual music and art festival, featuring reggae, reggae rock, folk, hip hop acts and live painting on-stage (Live painting stopped after 2019). The festival was founded in 2010 by Jeff Monser, and is held at the Monterey County Fairgrounds in Monterey, California, which was previously home of the Monterey Pop Festival where Jimi Hendrix set his guitar on fire in 1967. In its first year, the festival began as a one-day event headlining the Dirty Heads and Tribal Seeds. Today, The California Roots Festival has grown enormously in both size and attendance. It is organized over three full days with more than 11,000 attendees each day. It is described as the largest reggae-rock festival in the world and claims to one of the largest reggae festivals in the United States.

== History ==
The first installment of Cali Roots was a small one-day live music event with local attendance and mostly limited to bands drawn from a limited geographic area. California Roots was created and founded n 2010. Dan Sheehan joined the festival and was able to lay the groundwork for exponential growth - managing logistics and securing major reggae acts in order to play at the festival. These changes enabled this one-day music event to evolve into its current four-day format. Sheehan was able to construct one of the largest reggae and reggae-rock music festival in the world.

== Festival organization ==
The current festival involves curated lineups of live music, interactive art on stage, and engagement of a variety of events related to the practice and celebration of reggae culture over three days. The festival also works closely with pairs with non-profit organizations to raise funds for causes that align with the brand of Cali Roots. In recent years, the event has attracted more than 13,000 people each day. The California Roots Music and Arts Festival continues to grow rapidly. The festival takes steps to allows for freedom of expression and for fans to engage politically through music. Cali Roots Festival has headlined many notable reggae-like bands and artists over the years, including Atmosphere, Rebelution, Nas, Dirty Heads, and Slightly Stoopid.

== Performers ==
Date	Year	Headliners	Openers
May 29	2010	Dirty Heads; Tribal Seeds	Thrive, Top Shelf, Seedless, One Drop, Pyrx, The Holdup, 880 South, Pacific Dub, Meet Me @ The Pub, Through The Roots, Hallway Ballers, The Alliez, The Release, Matt Masih & The Messengers, Ease Up, Sinizen, Dubious, Kapakahi, My Peoples
May 28–29	2011	Rebelution; Iration; Tribal Seeds	The Holdup, Thrive, Tomorrow's Bad Seeds, Ooklah The Moc, Mystic Roots, Through The Roots, Wooster, Matt Masih, Stranger, Seedless, Clear Conscience, Top Self, Fortunate Youth, Conscious Souls, E.N. Young, HaleAmanO, True Press, High Tide, Jet West, Wasted Noise, Ease Up, Sinizen
May 26	2012	Pepper (26th); SOJA (27th)	J Boog, Anuhea, Mishka, Passafire, Micah Brown, Haleamano, True Press, Hi Roots, E.N. Young, Matt Masih, The Simpkin Project, HB Surround Sound, Clear Conscience, One A Chord, Beyond I Sight, Seedless
May 27	2012	Pepper (26th); SOJA (27th)	The Expendables, Iration, The Green, Thrive, Fortunate Youth, Seedless, Katastro, Whiskey Avengers, Just Chill, Sono Vero, Wasted Noise, Fiction 20 Down, Zen Robbi, Jam Kwest, Bare Feet, The Closeouts
May 24–26	2013	Slightly Stoopid; Rebelution; Matisyahu	The Expendables, Dirty Heads, Collie Buddz w/ New Kingston, Tribal Seeds, The Green, Katchafire, Don Carlos, Tomorrow's Bad Seeds, Rootz Underground, Ballyhoo!, Natural Vibrations, Pacific Dub, Stick Figure, Seedless, Fortunate Youth, Through The Roots, Thrive, Mystic Roots, Josh Heinrichs w/ 77 Jefferson & Skillinjah, Mike Pinto, Stranger, Indubious, Naia Kete, Whiskey Avengers, Fear Nuttin Band, Inna Vision, Three Legged Fox, The VeraGroove, Wait For Green, Arden Park Roots, Matt Masih & The Messengers, High Tide, Just Chill, One A Chord, Wheeland Brothers, Wasted Noise, Dub Seeds, The Closeouts, Kings & Comrades, Codi Jordan, Simple Creation, Black Salt Tone
May 23	2014	SOJA, Steel Pulse (23th); Rebelution, Ziggy Marley (24th); Damian "Jr. Gong" Marley, 311 (25th)	J Boog, Katchafire, Stick Figure, Passafire, B Side Players, Cisco Adler, Kimie, Maoli, The Expanders, Simpkin Project, Bumpin Uglies, The Steppas, The Stircrazies, Reeform
May 24	2014	SOJA, Steel Pulse (23th); Rebelution, Ziggy Marley (24th); Damian "Jr. Gong" Marley, 311 (25th)	Iration, Zion I, Alborosie, Nahko and Medicine for the People, AER, Los Rakas, Cas Haley, Katastro, Saraitah, True Press, Ojo De Buey, Tatanaka, Parafish, Dewey & The Peoples
May 25	2014	SOJA, Steel Pulse (23th); Rebelution, Ziggy Marley (24th); Damian "Jr. Gong" Marley, 311 (25th)	Pepper, The Green, Skunk Records (25th anniversary live on stage), Groundation, The Movement, New Kingston, HIRIE, Micah Brown, Beyond I Sight feat. Gonzo, Krooked Treez, Clear Conscience, Black Salt Tone, Iriefuse, White Glove Service
May 22	2015	SOJA (22nd); The Roots, Michael Franti and Spearhead (23rd); Slightly Stoopid (24th)	John Butler Trio, Steel Pulse, Nahko and Medicine for the People, Trevor Hall, Dilated Peoples, Giant Panda Guerilla Dub Squad, Blue King Brown, The Supervillains, Dustin Thomas, John Wayne and The Pain, Leilani Wolfgramm, Sun-Dried Vibes
May 23	2015	SOJA (22nd); The Roots, Michael Franti and Spearhead (23rd); Slightly Stoopid (24th)	Dirty Heads, Collie Buddz, Chronixx, John Brown's Body, The Skints, Mike Love, The Ethan Tucker Band, Beebs and Her Honey Makers, Soul Majestic, Arise Roots, KBong
May 24	2015	SOJA (22nd); The Roots, Michael Franti and Spearhead (23rd); Slightly Stoopid (24th)	Iration, Cypress Hill, Tribal Seeds, G. Love & Special Sauce, Common Kings, Fishbone, Fortunate Youth, Cas Haley, Pacific Dub, Fear Nuttin Band, E.N. Young, Animo
May 27	2016	Slightly Stoopid; Atmosphere (27th); Damian "Jr. Gong" Marley, Stephen "Ragga" Marley (28th); Rebelution, Michael Franti and Spearhead (29th)	The Expendables, J Boog, Barrington Levy, Katchafire, Fortunate Youth, Ooklah The Moc, Sticky Fingers, Thrive, Seedless, Peni Dean, Eli Mac, AMP Live, Adam Twelve, Westafa
May 28	2016	Slightly Stoopid; Atmosphere (27th); Damian "Jr. Gong" Marley, Stephen "Ragga" Marley (28th); Rebelution, Michael Franti and Spearhead (29th)	Pepper, The Green, Tarrus Riley, Mike Love, The Skints, The Expanders, Nattali Rize, Katastro, Jordan T, The Oles, Expanders Sound System, Dub Architect
May 29	2016	Slightly Stoopid; Atmosphere (27th); Damian "Jr. Gong" Marley, Stephen "Ragga" Marley (28th); Rebelution, Michael Franti and Spearhead (29th)	Tribal Seeds, Stick Figure, Protoje, HIRIE, Raging Fyah, Gondwana, Tomorrow's Bad Seeds, Josh Heinrichs, Wheeland Brothers, South Bay Dub All Stars, Tunnel Vision, AMP Live, Bulby York, J. Bowman
May 26–28	2017	Rebelution; Nas; Dirty Heads	SOJA, Iration, Thievery Corporation, Jurassic 5, Stick Figure, Nahko and The Machine For The People, Matisyahu, Collie Buddz, Alborosie, Common Kings, Anthony B, Protoje, Easy Star All Stars, Rising Appalachia, John Brown's Body, Yellowman, Unified Highway, Jah9, Jesse Royal, Mellow Mood, Passafire, RDGLDGRN, Ballyhoo!, Six60, Through The Roots, Zach Deputy, Tribal Theory, Humble Soul, Roots of Creation, Iya Terra, Beebs, Synrgy, The Late Ones, Tyrone's Jacket, Darenots, Skanks Roots Project
May 25	2018	Iration; Atmosphere (25th); Rebelution, Dispatch (26th); Slightly Stoopid; 311 (27th)	Steel Pulse, Chronixx, E-40, Alpha Blondy, HIRIE, Brother Ali, Sammy J, The Movement, Ocean Alley, Tropidelic
May 26	2018	Iration; Atmosphere (25th); Rebelution, Dispatch (26th); Slightly Stoopid; 311 (27th)	Stephen Marley, J Boog, Fortunate Youth, Ozomatli, Trevor Hall, The Holdup, The Hip Abduction, Anuhea, Xiuhtezcatl, The Ries Brothers
May 27	2018	Iration; Atmosphere (25th); Rebelution, Dispatch (26th); Slightly Stoopid; 311 (27th)	Tribal Seeds, The Green, Tash Sultana, Xavier Rudd, The Original Wailers, Mike Love, Raging Fyah, New Kingston, Darenots
May 24	2019	Stick Figure; Ben Harper and The Innocent Criminals; Atmosphere (24th); Slightly Stoopid; Dirty Heads (25th); Rebelution; SOJA (26th)	Citizen Cope, Steel Pulse, The Green, Common Kings, Fiji, The Skints, Don Carlos, Ballyhoo!, For Peace Band
May 25	2019	Stick Figure; Ben Harper and The Innocent Criminals; Atmosphere (24th); Slightly Stoopid; Dirty Heads (25th); Rebelution; SOJA (26th)	Tash Sultana, Pepper, Protoje, The Expendables, G. Love and Special Sauce, The Movement, Iya Terra, Jo Mersa Marley, Ocean Alley, Roots of a Rebellion
May 26	2019	Stick Figure; Ben Harper and The Innocent Criminals; Atmosphere (24th); Slightly Stoopid; Dirty Heads (25th); Rebelution; SOJA (26th)	UB40 feat. Ali & Astro, Nahko and Medicine for the People, Cypress Hill (performing Black Sunday), Collie Buddz, Matisyahu, Alborosie, Dread Mar I, Jesse Royal, Kabaka Pyramid, Xiuhtezcatl, The Elovaters
May 22–24*	2020	CANCELLED	*Original dates were postponed to October 9–11 due to the COVID-19 pandemic, but eventually festival was canceled. Scheduled performers: Oct. 9: Rebelution, Atmosphere, Chronixx, Pepper, Trevor Hall, Nahko and Medicine for the People, Tarrus Riley, The Movement, Satsang, Nattali Rize, Earthkry, Natural Vibrations, Arise Roots, Kash'd Out; Oct. 10: Stick Figure, Sean Paul; Tribal Seeds, J Boog, The Green, Collie Buddz, The Expendables, HIRIE, Dub Inc, Bumpin Uglies, The Elovaters, Sensi Trails; Oct. 11: Damian Marley, Ice Cube; Jimmy Cliff, Common Kings, Durand Jones, Iya Terra, Natiruts, Mike Love, Keznamdi, Through The Roots, Artikal Sound System, Vana Liya, Sublime with Rome
May 26–29*	2021	CANCELLED	*Twice delayed 11th annual festival was postponed due to the COVID-19 pandemic.
May 26	2022	Dirty Heads; Stephen Marley (26th); Rebelution; Atmosphere (27th); Slightly Stoopid; Stick Figure (28th); Damian "Jr. Gong" Marley; Ice Cube; Sean Paul (29th)	Protoje feat. Lila Ike & Sevana, Fortunate Youth, Alborosie, Demarco, DENM, Turbulence, Tropidelic, Eli Mac, Tunnel Vision
May 27	2022	Dirty Heads; Stephen Marley (26th); Rebelution; Atmosphere (27th); Slightly Stoopid; Stick Figure (28th); Damian "Jr. Gong" Marley; Ice Cube; Sean Paul (29th)	Chronixx, Pepper, J Boog, The Movement Brother Ali, Tarrus Riley, Satsang, Nattali Rize, Sa-Roc, Earthkry, Arise Roots, Natural Vibrations, Kash'd Out
May 28	2022	Dirty Heads; Stephen Marley (26th); Rebelution; Atmosphere (27th); Slightly Stoopid; Stick Figure (28th); Damian "Jr. Gong" Marley; Ice Cube; Sean Paul (29th)	Beenie Man, Tribal Seeds, Trevor Hall, The Green, Collie Buddz, The Expendables, Dub Inc, Bumpin Uglies, The Elovaters, FIA, Sensi Trails
May 29	2022	Dirty Heads; Stephen Marley (26th); Rebelution; Atmosphere (27th); Slightly Stoopid; Stick Figure (28th); Damian "Jr. Gong" Marley; Ice Cube; Sean Paul (29th)	Common Kings, Durand Jones & The Indications, Anthony B, HIRIE, Iya Terra, Mike Love, Keznamdi, Through The Roots, Artikal Sound System, Vana Liya, Sublime with Rome (debut performance)
May 25	2023	Rebelution (25th); Wu Tang Clan (26th); Stick Figure (27th); Dirty Heads (28th)	Michael Franti & Spearhead, Atmosphere, SOJA, Thievery Corporation, Katchafire, Dub Inc, Mahali, Subatomic Sound System, Anuhea, Thrive
May 27	2023	Rebelution (25th); Wu Tang Clan (26th); Stick Figure (27th); Dirty Heads (28th)	Sublime with Rome, Cypress Hill, Steel Pulse, Common Kings The Interruptors, L.A.B., Maoli, Jesse Royal, Lila Iké, Surfer Girl, Joe Samba, Kyle Smith, Soulwise
May 28	2023	Rebelution (25th); Wu Tang Clan (26th); Stick Figure (27th); Dirty Heads (28th)	Shaggy, Collie Buddz & Friends, Hieroglyphics feat. Del the Funky Homosapien, Gentlemen, HIRIE, Ozomatli, Alborosie, Badfish, KES, The Skints, The Hip Abduction, Little Stranger, Chali 2na & Cut Chemist, Cydeways
May 29	2023	Rebelution (25th); Wu Tang Clan (26th); Stick Figure (27th); Dirty Heads (28th)	Iration, Dispatch, Kolohe Kai, Matisyahu, The Movement, Natiruts, The Elovaters, Long Beach Dub Allstars, DENM, The Sacred Souls, Shwayze, KBong & Johnny Cosmic, Tunnel Vision, B Foundation, The Rudians
May 24	2024	E-40 & Too Short (24th); Damian "Jr. Gong" Marley; Stephen Marley (special acoustic set); Burning Spear (25th); Rebelution; Ice Cube (26th)	J Boog, The Elovaters, Fortunate Youth, Living Legends, Souls of Mischief, Kabaka Pyramid, Tropidelic, Arise Roots
May 25	2024	E-40 & Too Short (24th); Damian "Jr. Gong" Marley; Stephen Marley (special acoustic set); Burning Spear (25th); Rebelution; Ice Cube (26th)	Tribal Seeds, The Expendables, Xavier Rudd, Rawayana, L.A.B., Claire Wright, The Wide Eyed Kids
May 26	2024	E-40 & Too Short (24th); Damian "Jr. Gong" Marley; Stephen Marley (special acoustic set); Burning Spear (25th); Rebelution; Ice Cube (26th)	Pepper, Lupe Fiasco, Collie Buddz, The Green, Little Stranger, Artikal Sound System, Coyote Island, DMP

== See also ==
- List of reggae festivals
