= Iya Terra =

American roots reggae, dub band

- Genres: Roots reggae Reggae; Dub
- Years active: 2012–2023
- Label: Ineffable Records
- Members: Nathan Feinstein; Nick Loporchio; Luis Tovar; Nick Sefakis; Tanner Arebalo
- Past members: Danny Monar; Blake Bartz
- Website: www.iyaterra.com

Iya Terra were an American roots reggae and dub band based in Los Angeles, California.

== History ==
=== Formation and Self-titled EP (2013–2014) ===
Iya Terra first formed in 2013 when vocalist and lead guitarist Nathan Feinstein & bassist Nick Loporchio met. In the winter of 2013, Feinstein had moved to Las Vegas, and met Loporchio who was then attending UCLA, where he graduated with a degree in Molecular Biology

The duo added more members to their band including Luis Tovar on keyboard and Danny Monar on percussion in the spring of 2014.

With the newly added members, the band recorded their first raw album, a 6-song self-titled EP In Ventura, CA at Castaway 7 Studios; that released in the spring of 2014.

=== Full Circle (2015) ===
After the addition of Blake Bartz on drums in the fall of 2014 and Nick Sefakis on rhythm guitar in March 2015, they released their first studio album titled Full Circle on April 14, 2015. The 10-song album was engineered by the award-winning producer J.P. Hesser and recorded at Castaway 7 Studios in Ventura, California. It debuted at #4 on the iTunes Reggae Charts and #12 the Billboard Top Reggae Albums charts.

=== Sacred Sound (2017) ===
Iya Terra's second album Sacred Sound, which debuted on March 17, 2017, featured several reggae artists like Stick Figure and E.N Young from Tribal Seeds among others. The album peaked at #1 on the Billboard reggae albums chart on April 8, 2017.

=== Coming To Light (2019) ===
Because of Blake Bartz's departure, Iya Terra added Tanner Arebalo on drums in 2019.

The band's third album, Coming To Light released on July 26, 2019, peaked at #2 on the Billboard Top Reggae Albums chart. It featured The Movement, Zion Thompson of The Green, Jesse Royal among other reggae artists.

On May 29, 2020, the band released a live acoustic album, Iya Terra Live at Sugarshack Sessions.

Iya Terra was featured as one of many reggae bands on Collie Buddz riddim album, Cali Roots Riddim 2020 with their single, "Monterey Sunshine", which was produced by Collie Buddz and mixed by Stick Figure's touring guitarist, producer Johnny Cosmic.

In September 2020, Iya Terra was one of several reggae and punk bands on The House That Bradley Built, a charity compilation honoring Sublime's lead singer Bradley Nowell, helping musicians with substance abuse. They covered Sublime's song "Mary" on the Deluxe Edition.

=== Ease & Grace (2021) ===
The band released their fourth album, Ease & Grace on July 30, 2021. The album peaked at #11 on the Billboard Reggae Albums chart, just short of the Top 10.

Ease & Grace debuted at #1 on the current chart after selling 372 copies in its first week in the United States, according to data provided by sales tracker MRC Data (formerly Nielsen SoundScan). The album's total consumption from pure album sales plus stream equivalent albums was 974 units. This included 743,160 audio streams and 5,083 video streams in the U.S.

== Collaborations ==
The band collaborated with The Ries Brothers' song "Troubadour".

They also collaborated with The Movement on their song "Redwoodz".

They collaborated with Fortunate Youth on their song, "Groovin", which released on September 17, 2021.

== Touring ==
Iya Terra performed on their first tour in August 2014 planned by Nathan and Nick L. without additional management proved to be a success. It was called "The Link Up Tour" with Ital Vibes.

The banded signed up with Rude Entertainment Productions after The Link Up Tour and quickly went back on tour performing with the biggest reggae artists like: Arise Roots, Alborosie, Barrington Levy, Black Uhuru, Collie Buddz, Common Kings, Easy Star All Stars, The Expanders, The Green, House of Shem, John Brown's Body, Julian Marley, Ky-Mani Marley, Marlon Asher, Matisyahu, Nahko, Pepper, Stick Figure, Yellowman and others.

The band made their debut at the 31st annual Reggae on the River in Humboldt County, California in August 2015. Then followed it up with some shows with Tomorrow's Bad Seeds and Hawaii's own Ina Vision.

Iya Terra performed live with Twiddle, with which they also toured in 2018.

Iya Terra were slotted to support Stick Figure during their 2020 Once In A Lifetime summer tour. They were also scheduled to support Iration for their Heatseekers spring tour that same year. Both tours were canceled due to the COVID-19 pandemic.

Having originally announced their participation at the 2020 California Roots Music and Arts Festival before the cancelation, the group instead appeared as part of the "Cali Roots: Can't Stop The Music An Online Music Festival Experience" due to COVID-19 restrictions.

== Awards and honors ==
On December 26, 2021, Iya Terra made it to third place with the third most votes by Facebook, Instagram and Twitter users for the fans-choice "2021 Album of the Year" by Surf Roots TV & Radio for their album Ease & Grace. This is the band's first time being nominated with the reggae rock streaming TV channel on Amazon Fire TV, Apple TV, and Roku.

== Other projects ==
To celebrate Iya Terra's album Ease & Grace, the band teamed up with The Wine Boss (Paso Robles) for a special bottle of Red called "Ease & Grapes". It's a blend of 60% Cabernet Franc, 30% Petit Verdot and 10% Cabernet Sauvignon, flavored with cherries and spices.

== Lineup ==
- Nick Loporchio – Bass (2012–2023)
- Luis Tovar – Keyboard (2014–2023)
- Nick Sefakis – Rhythm Guitar (2015–2023)
- Tanner Arebalo – Drums (2018–2023)
- Blake Bartz – Drums (2014–2018)
- Danny Monar – Percussion (2014–2019)
- Nathan Feinstein – Lead Vocals, Lead Guitar (2012–2023)

== Discography ==
=== Studio albums ===
Iya Terra Chart History
Year	Album	Label	Random #
2014	Iya Terra EP	Self-released	—
2015	Full Circle	Self-released	#12
2017	Sacred Sound	Ineffable Records	#1
2019	Coming To Light	Ineffable Records	#2
2020	Iya Terra Live at Sugarshack Sessions	Sugarshack Records	—
2021	Ease & Grace	Ineffable Records	#11

=== Singles ===
Title	Release date	Album
"New Roots" (feat. Jah Faith)	2014	Iya Terra EP
"Love Is Crucial"	2014	Iya Terra EP
"The Hit"	2014	Iya Terra EP
"Bless Up" (feat. Karim Israel of Arise Roots & Kennedy Peneueta-Peapea of Ital Vibes)	2015	Full Circle
"Nice It Up"	2015	Full Circle
"Iya Lovin'"	2015	Full Circle
"Stand Strong" (feat. Vince Villagomez)	2015	Full Circle
"Real Sensi" (feat. New Kingston)	2015	Full Circle
"Movement"	2017	Sacred Sound
"Love & Respect"	2017	Sacred Sound
"Give Thanks" (feat. Stick Figure)	2017	Sacred Sound
"Humble Yourself"	2017	Sacred Sound
"...A Livication"	2017	Sacred Sound
"Gypsy Girl" (feat. E.N. Young)	2017	Sacred Sound
"Loving Design" (feat. Jacob Iosia)	2017	Sacred Sound
"Life Goes On" (feat. The Simpkin Project)	2017	Sacred Sound
"Anti-Establishment"	2017	Sacred Sound
"Break Down The Walls" (feat. The Movement)	2019	Coming To Light
"Wash Away"	2019	Coming To Light
"One Life" (feat. Satsang & Cas Haley)	2019	Coming To Light
"Marching On" (feat. Jesse Royal)	2019	Coming To Light
"Stars"	2019	Coming To Light
"Rainbow Road"	2019	Coming To Light
"Follow Your Heart" (feat. Zion Thompson of The Green)	2019	Coming To Light
"Carry The Weight"	2019	Coming To Light
"Many Rhythms One Sound"	2019	Coming To Light
"Burn For You"	2019	Coming To Light
"Fire & Water"	2019	Coming To Light
"Ganja Must Burn"	2019	Coming To Light
"Hold Ah Vibes"	2019	Coming To Light
"Give Thanks" (Live Acoustic)	2019	Sugarshack Sessions Selects, Vol. 1
"Don't Matta" (Live Acoustic)	May 8, 2020	Iya Terra Live at Sugarshack Sessions
"Monterey Sunshine" (feat. Collie Buddz)	May 22, 2020	Cali Roots Riddim 2020
"Streets Run Red"	June 2, 2020	(Single)
"Outer Space" (Produced by Stick Figure)	June 19, 2020	(Single)
"Mary" (Sublime cover)	September 4, 2020	The House That Bradley Built
"Ease & Grace"	February 5, 2021	Ease & Grace (Single)
"Price You'll Pay" (feat. Tribal Seeds)	March 2, 2021	Ease & Grace (Single)
"We All Walk Our Own Roads" (feat. Trevor Hall)	April 30, 2021	Ease & Grace (Single)
"Wiser Now"	June 15, 2021	Ease & Grace (Single)
"Forwards Bound" (feat. Steel Pulse)	July 23, 2021	Ease & Grace (Single)
"All Life" (feat. Mike Love)	July 30, 2021	Ease & Grace
"Take Control" (feat. Alborosie & Bobby "Lee" Jefferson)	July 30, 2021	Ease & Grace
"Take Control (Ganja White Knight Remix)" (feat. Alborosie & Bobby Lee of SOJA)	January 13, 2022	(Single)
"Helena" (My Chemical Romance Reggae Cover)	August 10, 2023	Pop Punk Goes Reggae, Vol. 1 (Single)
