= Natural Vibrations =

Hawaiian reggae band

- Origin: Kahalu'u, Hawaii, United States
- Genres: Reggae, Rock, Pop, Hawaiian
- Years active: 1992–Present
- Labels: Cinnamon Red Records; Go Aloha Entertainment
- Members: Wayne Enos; Sam Ites; Lucas Hom; Wayne Tejada; Pu'unui; Shane Abraham; Jehua Evans
- Past members: Penidean Pua'auli; Kayton Macariola; Keoni Macariola; Ricky Ibarra; Tony Saenz; Ekona Ravey; Jamin Wong; Brett Cummings; Max O'Leary; Timothy Pacheco; Stacey Medeiros
- Website: www.naturalvibrations.com

Natural Vibrations, (Natural Vibes for short or known by their fans as Natty Vibes), is a reggae band originally from Kahalu'u, Oahu, Hawaii, based out of San Diego, California with rock and pop influences. The band has received several awards at the Hawaii Music Awards and three Na Hoku Hanohano Awards.

== History ==
=== Formation ===
Natural Vibrations was formed by a group of friends who loved playing music; Penidean Pua'auli (lead vocals), Shane Abraham (keyboard, vocals), Kayton "Sly Mongoose" Macariola (percussion, vocals), Ricky "Koa" Ibarra (drums), Keoni Macariola (bass), and Wayne Enos (guitar, vocals) in 1992. They created a unique Hawaiian reggae sound with a party and dance style energy, which is described as "Jawaiian" (infusing Hawaiian music with Jamaican reggae). They became the premiere Hawaiian reggae band at backyard parties and festivals. Romantic love songs and smoking marijuana is a common theme in the band's songs.

=== Balls Rolling and All Natural ===
The band's first studio album, Balls Rolling, was released on June 1, 1996, and was a strong debut.

Their second album, All Natural, which was released on Cinnamon Red Records in late 1998. It won the Na Hoku Hanohano Award for best reggae album of the year in 1999.

=== Getting High & The Circle ===
Drummer Koa Ibarra was eventually replaced with Stacy Medeiros in 1997, and in 2000 Jehua Evans replaced Keoni Macariola on bass.

In 2000, the band's third album, Getting High, also released on Cinnamon Red Records, won them a second best reggae album award at the Hawaiian Music Awards.

Natty Vibes won the best reggae album category a third time for their fourth album, The Circle on September 2, 2003, which was released on their own label, Natural Vibrations Records. The album also peaked at #12 on the Billboard Top Reggae Albums chart.

=== From The Heart & Best of album ===
After five years in which the band concentrated on performing internationally and spending time with their families, their fifth album, From the Heart, was released on April 17, 2007, which in 2008 won a third best reggae album award at the Hawaiian Music Awards. The album gave them their highest Billboard chart placing, peaking at #5 on the Top Reggae Albums chart.

Their first compilation album, Ultimate Vibes, The best of Natural Vibrations, released on May 31, 2009. It peaked at #15 on the Billboard Reggae Albums chart.

=== Got This Music ===
Fatty Vibes released their sixth studio album, Got This Music, on September 6, 2011, on Go Aloha Entertainment. It was the band's first LP in five years. The album peaked at #12 on Billboard Reggae Albums charts. The album featured collaborations with Papa T from B.E.T. on two tracks and Jay 2boi, as well as Penidean's daughter Quela Pua'auli-Puahi singing a duet with her father.

After a couple years, Natty Vibes released two singles in 2013, "Make You Stay" on February 2 and "Let It Grow" featuring Marlon Asher on July 16. But the band slowly dismantled after.

=== Departure of Penidean ===
In July 2014, after 23 years in Natural Vibrations, Penidean Pua'auli decided to leave the band and move back to Hawaii to focus on family and concrete on a solo career under the name "Peni Dean". He reunited with Kayton Macariola who joined his band on percussion and vocals, and worked on several tracks together.

=== Reunion ===
Penidean returned for a Natural Vibrations island-wide reunion tour called The Mahalo Tour in January 2018. It had been five years since the original members performed together and the concert included a two-hour set with over 30 of their greatest hits. It included special guests Three Plus Ekolu, Ho'onu'a, Malino, and Ten Feet.

Penidean was once again on lead vocals for the single "Better Believe" which was released on August 8, 2019.

=== Legal battle ===
Penidean did not permanently return to Natty Vibes since the reunion tour. He continued to be a solo artist, along with bandmate Kayton Macariola. Despite writing most of the songs, the band asked him not to perform from the Natural Vibrations catalog while on stage as a solo artist like in the past, going so far as to order a cease and desist order from his former band.

=== Continuing band ===
Natural Vibrations was scheduled to perform at the 2020 and 2021 California Roots Festival, but both were postponed then eventually canceled due to the COVID-19 pandemic. On May 27, 2022, Natural Vibrations current lineup performed in "The Bowl" at California Roots Festival.

== Lineup ==
=== Current band members ===
- Wayne Enos – Guitar, Vocals (1992–Present)
- Sam Ites – Drums, Vocals (2021–Present)
- Lucas Hom – Keyboard, Vocals (2021–Present)
- Pu'unui – Bass, Vocals (2020–Present)
- Wayne Tejada – Lead Vocals (2021–Present)
- Shane "SKA Squiddy" Abraham – Keyboard, Vocals (1992–Present)
- Jehua Evans – Guitar, Bass, Vocals (2000–Present)

=== Past band members ===
- Penidean "Peni Dean" Pua'auli – Lead Vocals (1992–2014, 2018)
- Kayton "Sly Mongoose" Macariola – Percussion, Vocals (1992–2015, 2018)
- Keoni Macariola – Bass (1992–2007)
- Ricky "Koa" Ibarra – Drums (1992–2000)
- Tony Saenz – Drums (2014–2016)
- Brett "Big Chill" Cummings – Saxophone, Vocals (2016)
- Ekona Ravey – Bass, Vocals (2014–2016)
- Jamin "Chief Raga" Wong – Guitar, Vocals (2014–2016)
- Max O'Leary – Trumpet
- Timothy Pacheco – Drums
- Stacy Medeiros – Drums (2000–2014)

== Discography ==
=== Studio albums ===
Natural Vibrations Chart History
Year	Album	Label	Billboard peak
1996	Balls Rolling	Cinnamon Red Records	—
1998	All Natural	Cinnamon Red Records	—
2000	Getting High	Cinnamon Red Records	—
2003	The Circle	Cinnamon Red Records	#12
2007	From The Heart	Natural Vibrations Records	#5
2011	Got This Music	Go Aloha Entertainment	—

=== Compilations ===
- Ultimate Vibes: The Best of Natural Vibrations (2009), Natural Vibrations Records – Billboard Top Reggae Albums #15

=== Singles ===
Title	Release date	Album
"Balls Rolling"	1996	Balls Rolling
"Nice Day"	1996	Balls Rolling
"Luv Me Know"	1996	Balls Rolling
"Come & Skank"	1996	Balls Rolling
"Put A Little Love"	1998	All Natural
"One on One"	1998	All Natural
"Into Me"	1998	All Natural
"Chronics"	1998	All Natural
"Green Harvest"	2000	Getting High
"Bettah World"	2000	Getting High
"Getting High"	2000	Getting High
"Put Some Time"	2003	The Circle
"Never, Never"	2003	The Circle
"Hot Like Fire"	2003	The Circle
"Maryjane"	2003	The Circle
"Hopin' & Prayin'"	2003	The Circle
"Freedom Fighter"	2003	The Circle
"Natural Vibrations"	2003	The Circle
"Okana Road"	2007	From The Heart
"You and I"	2007	From The Heart
"So Nice"	2007	From The Heart
"Where Is The Love"	2007	From The Heart
"How Would I Know"	2007	From The Heart
"Lovin' You Too Much"	2007	From The Heart
"Squeeze My Head"	2007	From The Heart
"Irie Sensation"	2007	From The Heart
"Shawty"	2009	Ultimate Vibes: The Best of Natural Vibrations
"Man Down"	2009	Ultimate Vibes: The Best of Natural Vibrations
"Party & Dance"	2011	Got This Music
"Anxiously Awaiting"	2011	Got This Music
"The Vibes" (feat. Jay 2boi)	2011	Got This Music
"Sensi Nation" (feat. Papa T)	2011	Got This Music
"Don't Worry" (feat. Quela Pua'auli)	2011	Got This Music
"Sounds So Easy"	2011	Got This Music
"Are You Ready"	2011	Got This Music
"Make You Stay"	February 2, 2013	(Single)
"Let It Grow" (feat. Marlon Asher)	July 16, 2013	(Single)
"Better Believe"	August 8, 2019	(Single)
