= Pacific Dub =

American reggae band

- Origin: Huntington Beach, California
- Genres: Reggae rock, dub, alternative rock
- Years active: 2008–present
- Labels: Ineffable Records, Pacific Dub, Morning House Records, Zojak
- Members: Colton Place; David Delaney; Nathan Ueda
- Past members: Bryce Klemer; Ryan Naglich; Justin Quaress; Hunter Porter

Pacific Dub is an American reggae band from Huntington Beach, California, formed in 2008. Inspired by their hometown of Surf City, USA, their music conveys a message of peace and love. Their sound is known for its catchy choruses, surf-style guitar melodies, and smooth reggae rhythms. The band consists of lead vocalist and guitarist Colton Place, drummer David Delaney, and bassist Nathan Ueda.

== History ==
=== Early years: Fire Eye (2008–2011) ===
Pacific Dub was formed in 2008 as teenagers looking to put out music from the West Coast reggae rock, punk scene they were inspired from. They released their debut EP, First Drop, on March 9, 2009.

On August 28, 2009, they released their first studio album, Fire Eye. On April 20, 2010, they released another EP, To The Sky.

=== Tightrope (2012) ===
On June 26, 2012, they released their second studio album, Tightrope. The album debuted at #1 on iTunes Reggae Charts and allowed the group to headline their first national tour. The band performed 83 shows in over 30 states that year, supporting national acts, which included Collie Buddz, Dirty Heads, Matisyahu, Pepper, and Tomorrows Bad Seeds.

=== On hiatus (2015–2016) ===
The band took a break to rest and recover from extensive touring. However, in 2015 and 2016, this break turned into a hiatus after members had doubts about returning to the band and resuming a heavy touring schedule. So they went playing around 200 shows to zero. After starting their careers so young as teenagers, some members wanted to focus on themselves.

=== Take Me Away EP (2017) ===
On February 17, 2017, they released the EP Take Me Away, their first new music in five years with only four members coming back. It features 6-tracks with the single, "Running Back". The band also found a as they say, a more "mature" sound as the once heavy guitar solos and hip-hop elements are things of their past. They replaced them with a surf guitar style with "costal vibes" reminiscent of their environment.

=== Guide You Home (2019) ===
The next year, on May 25, 2018, they released their third studio album, Guide You Home. It features 11-tracks with the single, "Fly Away" featuring Brett Bollinger from Pepper.

On March 22, 2019, they released their fourth EP, Riptide with 4 new tracks.

=== Million Pieces (2021–present) ===
On June 25, 2021, they released their fourth studio album, Million Pieces. According to frontman Colton Place, the album is "100% a byproduct of the downtime that came as a result of the (COVID-19) Pandemic" and during that time the band had gained a new process for writing and recording from being able to take a step back and reprioritize when (they) were all forced to slow down.

In October 2022, Pacific Dub released the single "Live That Way", which was co-written with Kyle Ahern of Rebelution. In the summer and fall of 2023, they went on tour across the U.S. with punk/reggae band Tunnel Vision.

== Lineup ==
=== Current members ===
- Colton Place – Lead vocals, guitar
- Nathan Ueda– Bass
- David Delaney – Drums

=== Past members ===
- Hunter Porter – Lead guitar
- Bryce Klemer – Lead guitar
- Ryan Naglich – Bass
- Justin Quaress – Keyboard
- Casey Eubanks – Audio engineer

== Discography ==
=== Studio albums ===
Title	Released	Label
Fire Eye	August 28, 2009	Self-released
Tightrope	June 26, 2012	Zojak
Guide You Home	May 25, 2018	Morning House Records
Million Pieces	June 25, 2021	Ineffable Records

=== Extended plays ===
Title	Released	Label
First Drop	March 9, 2009	Self-released
To the Sky	April 20, 2010	Self-released
Take Me Away	February 17, 2017	Self-released
Riptide	March 22, 2019	Ineffable Records

=== Compilations ===
Title	Released	Label
The Summer Singles	May 27, 2014	Self-released

=== Singles ===
Title	Released	Album
"Best of All Time"	2010	Non-album single
"Listen Up"	2014	The Summer Singles
"Cross That Line"	2014	The Summer Singles
"Fly Away" (featuring Bret Bollinger of Pepper)	2017	Guide You Home
"Reaching"	2018	Guide You Home
"Don't Tell Me" (featuring Andy Chaves of Katastro)	2018	Guide You Home
"I'll Be There"	2019	Non-album singles
"Hold Me Down"	2019	Non-album singles
"Million Pieces"	2021	Million Pieces
"Until I Get Home"	2021	Million Pieces
"I Got You"	2021	Million Pieces
"Take Me Home"	2021	Million Pieces
"Sunny Day" (featuring Arise Roots)	2022	TBA
"Live That Way"	2022	TBA
"Rearview"	2023	TBA
"Swisher Sweet"	2023	TBA
"It's All Good"	2023	TBA
"Head Down" (feat. Passafire)	2024	TBA
