= Raging Fyah =

- Origin: Kingston, Jamaica
- Genres: Reggae
- Years active: 2006–present
- Labels: Dub Rockers; VP Records
- Members: Odean "Journey" Ricketts; Delroy "Pele" Hamilton; Anthony "ToniDrumz" Watson; Courtland "Gizmo" White; Demar "Demz" Gayle; Nicolas "Grossy" Groskopf; Back vocal
- Website: ragingfyah.com

Raging Fyah is five-piece reggae band from Kingston, Jamaica, formed in 2006. They released their first album in 2011, and in 2016 signed to VP Records, with third album Everlasting earning them a Grammy nomination.

== Career ==
Delroy "Pele" Hamilton, Demar "Demz" Gayle, and Anthony "ToniDrumz" Watson met while studying music at Edna Manley College of the Visual and Performing Arts in Kingston, where they studied under Ibo Cooper, former keyboardist with Third World. They formed Inside Out in 2002, changing their name to Raging Fyah in 2006. According to Gayle, the band's name came from their time as house band at a studio in Standpipe owned by a man known as 'Raging', with someone remarking after one of their performances that the band's sound "was not just Raging, it was a 'Raging Fyah'".

In 2011, they released their debut album Judgement Day. In that same year the band hit the road to perform on a number of global stages as well as to headline several major reggae festivals in Europe including Summerjam, Rototom Sunsplash and Garance.

The group's second album, Destiny, was released in 2014, and included the anti-bullying themed single "Brave".

In Fall 2015 Raging Fyah signed a multi-album deal with VP Records. In Spring 2016 Raging Fyah released Everlasting, their debut album for VP Records’ Dub Rockers imprint, recorded live at Kingston's Tuff Gong Studios with producer Llamar "Riff Raff" Brown, and featuring collaborations with Busy Signal, J Boog, and Jesse Royal. The album peaked at no. 2 on the Billboard Reggae Albums chart, and featured at no. 5 in the magazine's "10 Best Reggae Albums of 2016". It also reached the top 10 of the CMJ World Charts. Raging Fyah spent the rest of the year touring the US with Stick Figure and Fortunate Youth, and a 2016 European tour bringing Stick Figure as support. That year they were nominated in the 'Most Outstanding Show Band' category at the International Reggae & World Music Awards.

2016 ended with Everlasting receiving a Grammy nomination for Best Reggae Album. 2017 began with an extensive tour across the US supporting Tribal Seeds, followed by a summer tour in the UK supporting Ali Campbell's version of UB40. In 2018 lead singer Kumar Bent left the band to concentrate on a solo career. In 2019 the band released the single "Better Tomorrow."

== Band members ==
- Odean "Journey" Ricketts – guitar/lead vocal
- Delroy "Pele" Hamilton – bass
- Anthony "ToniDrumz" Watson – drums
- Demar "Demz" Gayle – keyboards
- Nicolas "Grossy" Groskopf – guitar

== Videos ==
- "Far Away"
- "Brave"
- "Irie Vibe"
- "Jah Glory"
- "Barriers"
- "Running Away"
- "Nah Look Back"
- "Milk & Honey"
- "Dash Wata"

== Albums ==
- Judgement Day (2011), Raging Fyah Production
- Destiny (2014), Corner Stone Music
- Everlasting (2016), Dub Rockers
