= Arise Roots =

American roots reggae band

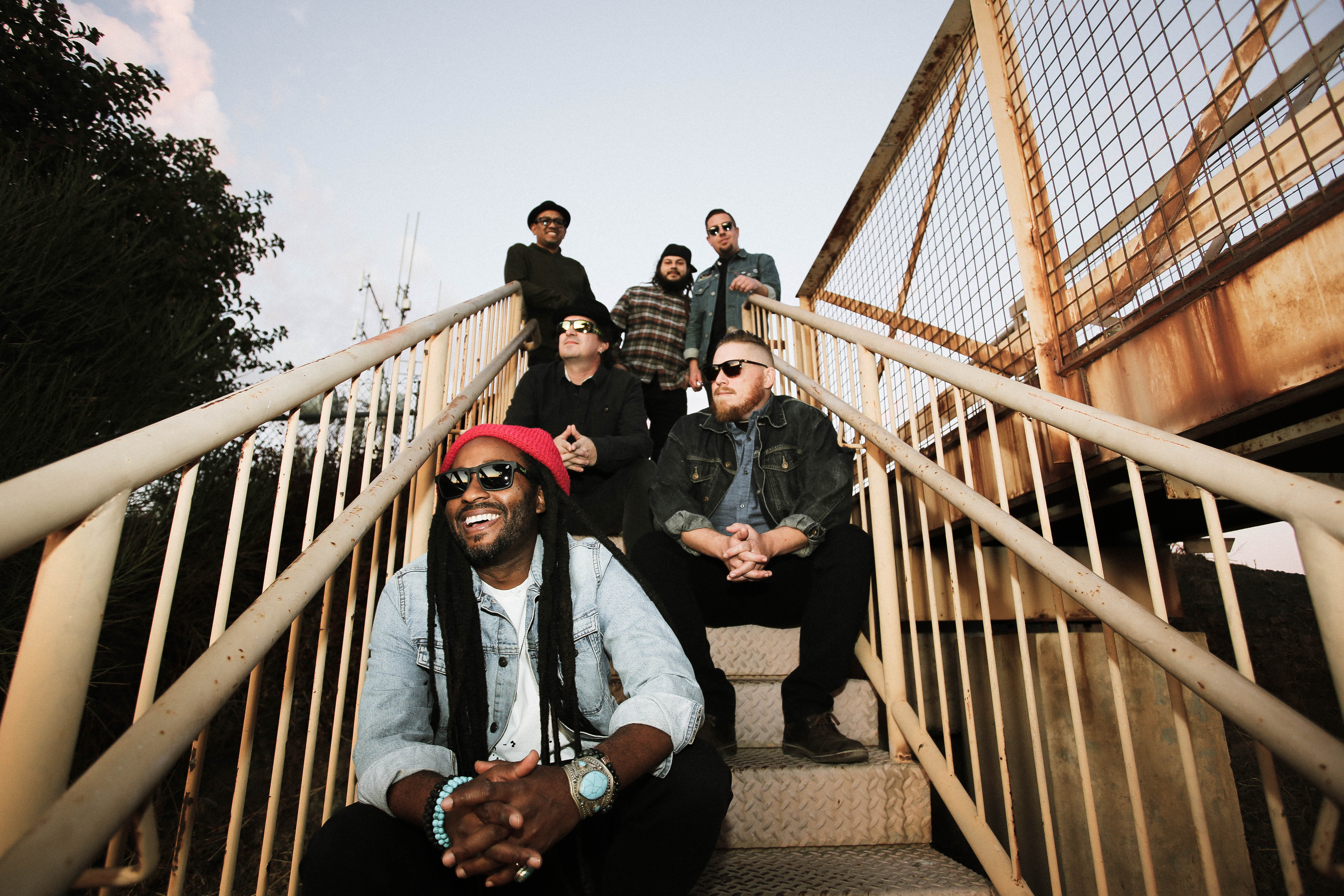
- Arise Roots in 2019

Background information
- Origin: Los Angeles, California
- Genres: Roots reggae Rock
- Years active: 2010 – Present
- Label: Ineffable Records
- Members: Karim Israel; Todd Johnson; Robert Sotelo; Hashim Russell; Christopher Brennan; Eduardo Lozoya
- Past members: Ron Montoya, Blake Colie, Rodolfo Covarrubias, Angel Salgado
- Website: http://www.ariseroots.com

Arise Roots is an American roots reggae band based out of Los Angeles, California. Their music is described as a "positive classic roots sound with a modern twist".

== History ==
=== Formation and Lay Your Guns Down EP (2010) ===
Arise Roots formed in 2010 in L.A. with a focus on traditional reggae music.

With Montoya on the drum kit, Rudy Covarrubias on bass, Todd Johnson on keys and harmonies, Arise Roots needed a soulful singer. Karim Israel was added on lead vocals when he answered Montoya's ad on Craigslist. A month later, lead guitarist, Robert Sotelo was added to the band.

On November 16, 2010, the band self-released their first EP titled, Lay Your Guns Down.

=== Moving Forward (2013) ===
On February 19, 2013, the band released their first full-length album, Moving Forward, a 16-song LP they self-produced. The album was recorded at one of L.A.'s top studios, Kingsize Soundlabs. It was mastered by veteran recording engineers Brian Dixon and Richard Robinson.

=== Love & War (2014) ===
Their second album, Love & War was released on August 5, 2014. The album was engineered by E.N Young of Tribal Seeds at his Imperial Sound Recording Studio in San Diego, California. It features E.N. Young himself, Rootz Underground, HIRIE, Dan Kelly of Fortunate Youth and other reggae artists on some tracks.

In 2016, Arise Roots released two summer singles, "Rootsman" featuring reggae legend Capleton and the second single "Crisis" exclusively on vinyl via Angel City Records.

=== Pathways (2020) ===
Arise Roots was featured as one of many reggae bands on Collie Buddz riddim album, Cali Roots Riddim 2020 with their single, "Cali Love", which was produced by Collie Buddz and mixed by Stick Figure's touring guitarist, producer Johnny Cosmic.

On July 30, 2020, the band released their third album, Pathways on Ineffable Records. However, Ron Montoya did not return and Blake Colie was added on drums.

The 15-track studio album was recorded at 17th Street Recording Studio in Costa Mesa, California. It features Kyle McDonald of Slightly Stoopid, Eric Rachmany of Rebelution, Lutan Fyah, Nattali Rize and Turbulence.

Arise Roots announced on their social media pages that they will release their first dub album, titled Dubways, an accompaniment to their Pathways album. The LP album is mixed by Zion I Kings and only available digitally on January 27, 2023 on Ineffable Records. The band will be releasing a new single every Friday, starting with their first single, "For Who You Are Dub".

== Lineup ==
=== Current band members ===
- Karim Israel – Lead Vocals (2010–Present)
- Todd "Rootsbubbler" Johnson – Keyboard, Backing Vocals (2010–Present)
- Robert "Sloedub" Sotelo – Lead Guitar (2010–Present)
- Rodolfo "Rudy" Covarrubias – Bass (2010–Present)
- Chris Brennan – Rhythm Guitar, Backing Vocals (2014–Present)
- Hashim "Scorpion" Russell – Drums (2022–Present)

=== Past band members ===
- Ron Montoya – Drums (2010–2017)
- Winston Peters – Drums (2017–2018)
- Blake Colie – (2018–2021)
- Angel Salgado – Rhythm Guitar, Backing Vocals (2010–2014)

=== Subs ===
- Jamey "Zeb" Dekofsky – Drums
- Jason Beltran – Bass
- Eddie "Chiquis" Lozoya – Rhythm Guitar

== Discography ==
=== Studio albums ===
Arise Roots Chart History
Year	Album	Label	Billboard peak
2013	Moving Forward	Self-released	—
2014	Love & War	Self-released	—
2020	Pathways	Ineffable Records	—

=== EPs/Dub Album ===
Arise Roots Chart History
Year	Album	Label	Billboard peak
2010	Lay Your Guns Down EP	Self-released	—
2020	One Life To Live EP	Ineffable Records	—
2023	Dubways LP	Ineffable Records	—

=== Singles ===
Title	Release date	Album
"The Vibe"	2010	Lay Your Guns Down EP
"Compromise"	2010	Lay Your Guns Down EP
"Lay Your Guns Down (Murderer)"	2010	Lay Your Guns Down EP
"Arise"	2013	Moving Forward
"Mellow Mood"	2013	Moving Forward
"Never Gonna Give You Up"	2013	Moving Forward
"Cool Me Down" (feat. HIRIE)	2014	Love & War
"Dangerous" (feat. Matt Liufau)	2014	Love & War
"Better Man"	2014	Love & War
"Give It Up"	2014	Love & War
"Warrior"	2014	Love & War
"Lost In Your Ocean" (feat. Dan Kelly of Fortunate Youth)	2014	Love & War
"Bring It All"	2014	Love & War
"What A Shame" (feat. Rootz Underground)	2014	Love & War
"Love You Right"	2014	Love & War
"A Little More" (feat. E.N. Young of Tribal Seeds)	2014	Love & War
"Back To You"	2014	Love & War
"Fear Factory"	2014	Love & War
"Rootsman Town" (feat. Capleton)	June 14, 2016	(Single)
"Crisis"	June 28, 2016	(Single)
"Indigenous People"	December 1, 2016	(Single)
"So High" (feat. Marlon Asher, Josh Heinrichs & SkillinJah)	June 14, 2017	(Single)
"Cali Love" (feat. Collie Buddz)	May 22, 2020	Cali Roots Riddim 2020 (Single)
"Come and Get It" (feat. Kyle McDonald of Slightly Stoopid & Eric Rachmany of Rebelution)	2020	One Life To Live EP
"Nice and Slow"	2020	One Life To Live EP
"One Life To Live"	2020	One Life To Live EP
"Here I Am"	2020	Pathways
"Lions in the Jungle" (feat. Lutan Fyah, Turbulence & Nattali Rize)	2020	Pathways
"For Who You Are"	2020	Pathways
"You Can Have It All"	2020	Pathways
"Stepping Like a General"	2020	Pathways
"If You Let Me"	2020	Pathways
"Selecta"	2020	Pathways
"Follow The Leader"	2020	Pathways
"Fade Away"	2020	Pathways
"Babylon Bwoy"	2020	Pathways
"Colors"	2020	Pathways
