= Soul Majestic =

Reggae band

- Origin: Santa Barbara, California, U.S.
- Genres: Roots reggae; dub
- Years active: 2001–present
- Labels: Zojak
- Members: Eric Iverson; Oriana Sanders; David Lyons; Michael Mendez; Westin Byrley; Kevin Long
- Website: https://soulmajestic.com

Soul Majestic is an American reggae band from Santa Barbara, California. The band consists of founding members: Eric Iverson and Oriana Sanders on lead vocals, David Lyons on lead guitar, and a rotating cast of other musicians including Michael Mendez on keys, Westin Byrley on drums, and Kevin Long on bass. They are best known for their songs "New World Rising" and "First Light".

== History ==
The band was originally formed in 1999 as a three-piece, consisting of Eric Iverson, Oriana Sanders, and David Lyon. Iverson and Sanders are now married and have kids. Soul Majestic released their debut album, a self-titled album, in 2003. The album was recorded at Tuff Gong Studios in Jamaica. Iverson has said places like Jamaica and Hawaii have inspired the band to connect with their inner creativity and express themselves from within.

The band's sixth record, Keep It Burning, was born primarily during the Standing Rock Protests of 2016 and was released in July 2020. They released an instrumental/dub version of the album in 2023.

== Discography ==
=== Studio albums ===
- Soul Majestic (2003)
- Until That Day (2004)
- Better World (2009)
- Setting the Tone (2014)
- Pass it Around (2016)
- Keep It Burning (2020)

=== Singles ===
Title	Year	Album
"First Light"	2009	Better World
"Medical Condition 215"	2011	Non-album single
"Setting the Tone"	2014	Setting the Tone
"Back in the Day"	2014	Setting the Tone
"Rockaway"	2015	Pass It Around
"Deep Green"	2015	Pass It Around
"Dub It Out"	2015	Pass It Around
"Falling in Love"	2016	Pass It Around
"Stay With Me"	2016	Pass It Around
"Right Kinda Vibe"	2017	Non-album single
"Time Has Come"	2019	Keep It Burning
"Can't Wait" (feat. Josh Heinrichs and Dread Kennedy)	2020	Keep It Burning
"Don't Give Up"	2020	Keep It Burning
"Blue Summer"	2022	Non-album singles
"Touch the Sky" (feat. Inna Vision)	2022	Non-album singles
"Ashes To Ashes"	2024	TBA
