= DENM =

American musician

Mac Montgomery, better known by his stage name DENM, is an American bedroom pop/reggae musician, songwriter, and producer from Santa Barbara, California.

== History ==
Montgomery got into music at a young age, and when he was 14 he taught himself to play guitar to replicate parts of Led Zeppelin's second album, Led Zeppelin II. He formerly played in a band called FMLYBND before he began focusing on performing as a solo artist. FMLYBND has been on hiatus since 2015.

In 2016, he began recording music as DENM, a name that he believed felt "unique to him". He released his debut single, "Lit", on May 19, 2016. The song was featured on his debut EP Dreamhouse, which was released on August 26, 2016.

DENM signed a license agreement with Ineffable Records in 2020. On November 13, 2020, he released the single "My Wave". It was followed by the singles "Fallin" and "Califas", the latter featuring Jared Watson of Dirty Heads, in early 2021. On April 16, 2021, DENM released the Califas EP, which includes these three songs plus "Blow It Up". On May 14, 2021, DENM released his debut studio album, Slum Beach Denny. It includes every song from the Califas EP, plus guest appearances from Casey Veggies, GDSN, Darnell Williams, and more.

== Tours ==
In late 2022–2023, he went on tour with Boostive and Jakob Nowell. DENM performed on Iration's Daytrippin' Tour which featured Pepper and opener Artikal Sound System in the summer of 2024. DENM performed on Slightly Stoopid’s Road Trippin’ Tour in 2026.

== Influences ==
He considers some of his biggest musical influences to be the Marley's (such as Bob), Chris Cornell, Bradley Nowell of Sublime, Jimi Hendrix, Lenny Kravitz, and Kendrick Lamar.

== Band ==
=== Current lineup ===
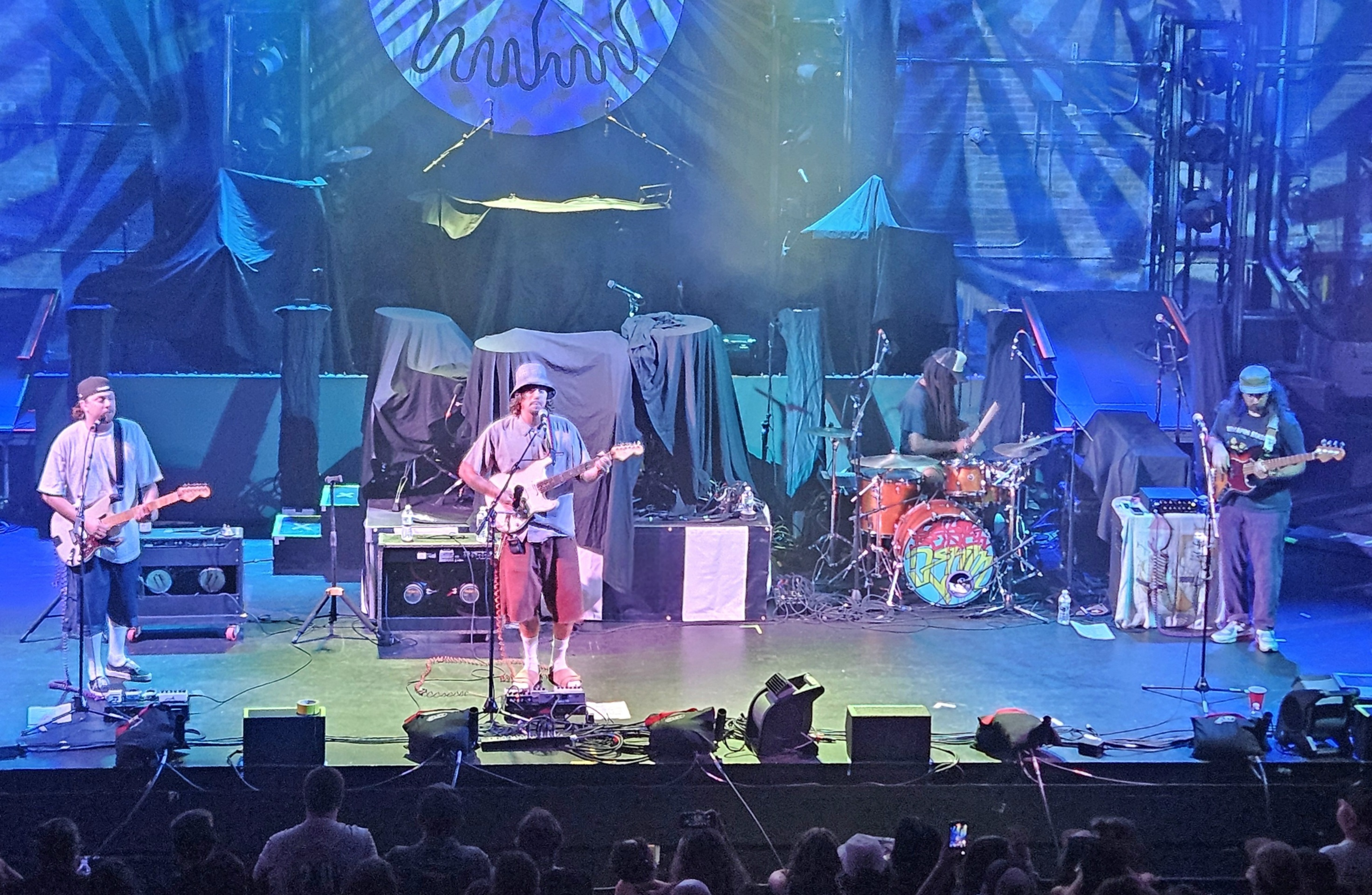
DENM and his band performing on tour in New Haven, CT, Summer 2024

DENM's band members:

- DENM – lead vocals/guitar
- Benny Ranks – guitar/backing vocals/raps
- Cowabunga – bass
- Saxamon - Sax
- Kimo C – drums

== Discography ==
=== Studio albums ===
- Slum Beach Denny (2021)
- Hot N Glassy (2025)

=== Extended plays (EP's) ===
- Dreamhouse (2016)
- Is Whatever (2018)
- Califas (2021)
- Slum Beach Posse, Vol. 1 (w/ Landon McNamara) (2023)
- DENM | OurVinyl Sessions (2023)

== Personal life ==
DENM was born in San Diego, CA, and lived in San Diego until he was 14. He had some run ins with trouble and moved to Santa Barbara to be with his mother, and was kicked out of her house when he was 16. He got married at a young age and has four children. He is in his early 30's. His oldest is 12, then 8, then 7, and then 4. The Montgomery family now lives in Southern California
