= Through The Roots =

American reggae rock/pop band

- Origin: San Diego, California
- Genres: Reggae; Rock; Pop
- Years active: 2007–Present
- Labels: LAW Records; Ineffable Records
- Members: Evan Hawkins; Brady O'Rear; Corrick Watson; Ekona Ravey
- Past members: Bryan Jackson; Chris Cruz; Taylor Boatwright; Scott Goldberg; Budda Foster; Ross Garcia
- Website: http://www.throughtheroots.com

Through The Roots is an American reggae rock and pop band based out of San Diego, California. They are described as "easy-listening music with positive Cali-vibes and inspiring messages".

== History ==
=== Formation (2007–2008) ===
Through The Roots (or TTR) started out in San Diego, California in 2007 when frontman/guitarist Evan Hawkins and drummer Taylor Boatwright met one day at a local Guitar Center with an idea to start a reggae/rock band. Next, bassist Bryan Jackson and guitarist Chris Cruz met the two through mutual friends and joined the band, naming it Through The Roots. In 2008, keyboardist Brady O'Rear who was from Hilo, Hawaii was found through an ad on Craigslist. The quartet became friends in college and officially came together as a band in 2008 by playing backyard house parties, college parties, and eventually local festivals.

They blended their unique sounds of reggae, rock and pop music and created their first raw album with the singles "Best Friend", "Stay Positive", and "Man Down" which all received solid airplay on San Diego and Santa Barbara radio stations in 2008. They opened up for Pepper at San Diego State University in 2009 and Rebelution the same year.

=== Touring and Self-titled EP (2010–2011) ===
TTR then joined Iration for their Time Bomb Tour in spring 2010, performing 20 shows in 25 days, which added to their fan base. The added guitarist Corrick Watson and bassist Budda Foster who both played on tour after the departure of original member Chris Cruz.

TTR started off 2011 by being named The Pier Magazine's "2011 Newcomer of the Year". The online website which covers the reggae/rock genre based its selection on fan voting across country.

After officially releasing their self-titled 6-song EP (which included their three singles) on February 16, 2011, TTR quickly captured music fans' attention all over the West Coast as the band rose in popularity and became a must-see show.

=== Here To Stay EP (2011) ===
After adding Scott Goldberg on lead guitar, the band released their second EP titled, Here To Stay on March 10, 2011, which featured four more tracks. They quickly went on tour performing three-shows in Oahu, Hawaii with The Green and Pressure Drop. Then one show in Hilo with SOJA. Here To Stay EP quickly rose on the iTunes Reggae Top 200 chart to #2 in the first week and remained amongst the best selling albums. It also garnered air time on the West Coast and in Hawaii, adding to their self-titled six-song EP, with both EPs remaining in iTunes Top 50 selling reggae CDs for the year.

They released a Remix EP called Zombies that featured the title track plus its seven remixes by DJ's and Dub artists.

=== Take You There (2013) ===
Through The Roots released their debut full-length album, Take You There on July 30, 2013. They added Ross Garcia who took over for Bryan Jackson on bass. Their first single off the 9-song album was "Dancing in the Rain". Take You There debuted at #3 on the iTunes Reggae Top 20 chart in late July and reached #5 on the Billboard Top Reggae Albums chart. They closed 2013 with Take You There being nominated for the Reggaeville 2013 Album of the Year, with fans voting online to announce the winner. It was a prestigious honor for TTR to be on the nominees' list that included some of the biggest names in reggae.

=== Stripped and Exposed EP (2015) ===
After another lineup change that included bassist Ekona Ravey, TTR's third EP, Stripped and Exposed was released on April 28, 2015, which included acoustic versions of their previous songs, as well as a new single, "Bear With Me" featuring Eric Rachmany of Rebelution. The EP reached #5 on the Billboard Reggae Albums chart.

=== Arrival (2019) ===
The band signed to Pepper's label LAW Records for their second LP album, Arrival which released on June 7, 2019. Evan Hawkins described the album as "finding their sound as a band. We didn't have any features on that album, because we wanted that to be our thing and showcase us as a band." It reached #4 on the Billboard Reggae Albums chart.

=== Departure (2020) ===
TTR decided to sign with Ineffable Records for their third album, Departure, which released on November 20, 2020. It featured Duddy B of Dirty Heads, Lutan Fyah, Eli Mac, Katastro and other reggae artists. Evan Hawkins explained, "We wanted to showcase some of the best artists that could help us shine a light on different genres in the right way.

In January 2021, Through The Roots was one of several reggae and punk bands on The House That Bradley Built, a charity compilation honoring Sublime's lead singer Bradley Nowell, helping musicians with substance abuse. They covered Sublime's song "Real Situation" on the Deluxe Edition.

Through The Roots was featured as one of many reggae bands on Collie Buddz riddim album, Cali Roots Riddim 2021 with their single, "Everywhere I Go", which was produced by Buddz and mixed by Stick Figure's touring guitarist, producer Johnny Cosmic.

On October 8, 2021, TTR digitally released Departure Remix EP on Ineffable Records. It features six remixed versions of songs from their 2020 Departure album by top producers, Amp Live, Iotosh, Green Lion Crew, Calvin Valentine, Squeeda, and Coast Club.

=== TTR (2022) ===
Through The Roots recorded their fourth full-length studio album, simply titled TTR which was released on August 26, 2022. The band wanted to "take things in a different direction" for this project. Everything from the "vibe, songwriting, production, studio they recorded these songs in, and the visual aspect". In December 2021, they decided to head to Nashville, Tennessee on a "new adventure" and to start recording for seven days. The 8-track album features appearances from Walshy Fire and Just Liv and Zac Jone$.

On December 20, 2023, the band released their first live album titled, TTR Live at Garden Amp on all streaming platforms. The album showcases their live and raw performance at Garden Amp in Garden Grove, California. The band says, "We really thought it would be cool to give our fans the experience to be at a show and literally hear themselves screaming and singing along."

== Other projects ==
In the fall of 2023, Through The Roots teamed up with Pablo Robles of Wine Boss to make a limited run bottle of rosé called, "Fire Away Rosé" after their single "Fire Away".

== Lineup ==
=== Current band members ===
- Evan Hawkins – Lead Vocals, Guitar (2007–Present)
- Brady O'Rear – Keyboards (2008–Present)
- Calvin Canha – Drums (2020–Present)

=== Past band members ===
- Bryan Jackson – Bass (2007–2011) (featured on TTR's three EPs)
- Chris Cruz – Guitar, Keyboard (2007–2013) (featured on TTR's three EPs)
- Taylor Boatwright – Drums, Vocals (2007–2017) (featured on TTR's three EPs)
- Budda Foster – Bass, Keyboard (2010–2019) (featured on Take You There and Arrival album)
- Scott Goldberg – Lead Guitar, Vocals (2011–2013) (featured on Take You There album)
- Ross Garcia – Bass (2013–2014) (featured on Take You There album)

== Discography ==
=== Studio albums ===
Through The Roots Chart History
Year	Album	Label	Billboard peak
2013	Take You There	Self-released	#5
2019	Arrival	LAW Records	#4
2020	Departure	Ineffable Records	—
2022	TTR	ONErpm	TBD

=== Extended Plays (EPs) & Live albums ===
Chart History
Year	Album	Label	Billboard peak
2011	Through The Roots EP	Self-released	—
2013	Here To Stay EP	Self-released	—
2015	Stripped and Exposed EP	Self-released	#5
2023	TTR Live at Garden Amp	Self-released	—

=== Compilations ===
- Primavolta & Protohype Feat. Through The Roots – Bigger Than You & Me (2013) Vicious Bitch Records (Single/Remix EP)

=== Singles ===
Title	Release date	Album
"Best Friend"	2011	Through The Roots EP
"Stay Positive"	2011	Through The Roots EP
"Man Down"	2011	Through The Roots EP
"Weekend"	2013	Here To Stay EP
"Paradise"	2013	Here To Stay EP
"Here To Stay"	2013	Here To Stay EP
"Zombies"	2013	Zombies Remix EP
"On This Vibe"	2013	Take You There
"Higher"	2013	Take You There
"Down To Earth"	2013	Take You There
"Take You There"	2013	Take You There
"Slow Down"	2013	Take You There
"All of Your Love"	2013	Take You There
"Like That"	2013	Take You There
"Bear With Me" (feat. Eric Rachmany of Rebelution)	2015	Stripped and Exposed EP
"Bloodshot Eyes"	December 1, 2016	(Single)
"Dancing in the Rain"	2019	Arrival
"Catch A Flight"	2019	Arrival
"Such A Shame"	2019	Arrival
"Come Home"	2019	Arrival
"Not This Time"	2019	Arrival
"You + Me"	2019	Arrival
"Start the Clock"	2019	Arrival
"Lovely and Rich"	2019	Arrival
"Dancing in the Rain" (Live Acoustic)	May 10, 2019	Sugarshack Sessions Selects, Vol. 1
"In My Head" (feat. Duddy B of Dirty Heads)	2020	Departure
"Rollin'" (feat. Eli Mac)	2020	Departure
"At Peace" (feat. Lutan Fyah)	2020	Departure
"Cool Down" (feat. Pepper & Katastro)	2020	Departure
"Words As Weapons" (feat. Runkus & Iotosh)	2020	Departure
"My Girl" (feat. Jesse Royal)	2020	Departure
"Action" (feat. Yung L)	2020	Departure
"Paper Planes" (feat. Likkle Jordee)	2020	Departure
"Everywhere I Go"	May 28, 2021	Cali Roots Riddim 2021 (Single)
"At Peace" – Squeeda Remix (feat. Lutan Fyah)	September 10, 2021	(Single)
"Delivery" (feat. Walshy Fire)	May 27, 2022	TTR (Single)
"No Friends"	July 1, 2022	TTR (Single)
"Call On Me"	July 29, 2022	TTR (Single)
"Tequila X Cannabis"	August 26, 2022	TTR
"Can't Stand Up" (feat. Just Liv & Zac Jone$)	August 26, 2022	TTR
"Refund" (feat. Busy Signal)	May 11, 2023	(Single)
"Fire Away"	August 30, 2023	(Single)
"Hot Damn"	February 13, 2024	(Single)
"Hey Love" (feat. Kaylan Arnold)	May 4, 2024	(Single)
