= The Ries Brothers =

American musical duo

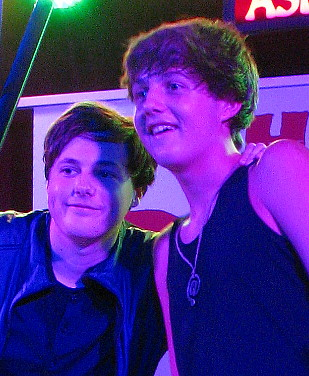
- The Ries Brothers at The Saint, Asbury Park, NJ August 18, 2015.

Background information
- Origin: Clearwater, Florida, United States
- Genres: Rock; blues; funk; reggae; pop rock; alternative rock
- Years active: 2012–present
- Labels: Management: David Parnes
- Members: Charlie Ries; Kevin Ries
- Website: riesbrothers.com

The Ries Brothers (pronounced "Rees") are a musical duo from Tampa, Florida, playing a mix of rock, blues, funk, and reggae. Older brother, Charlie, sings lead vocals while playing drums and keyboard bass. Younger brother, Kevin Jordan, plays guitar, provides background vocals, and co-writes many of their songs.

== Early career ==
Charlie Ries' interest in music was inspired by The Beatles. During his childhood he started piano, drums, and singing, which he can now play simultaneously. This self-taught technique was inspired by The Doors' Ray Manzarek. Charlie's other influences include Jack Johnson, John Mayer, and The Black Keys.

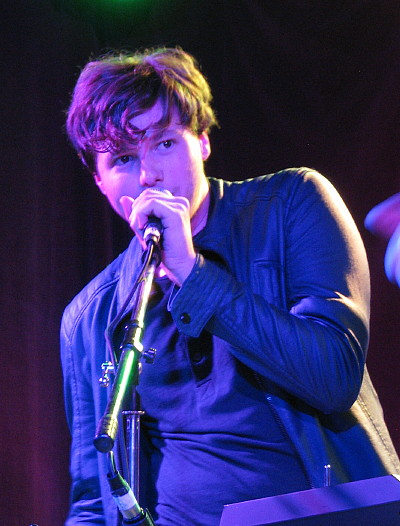
Charlie Ries performing at The Saint, Asbury Park, NJ on August 18, 2015.

Kevin was inspired by Jimi Hendrix to become a guitarist.

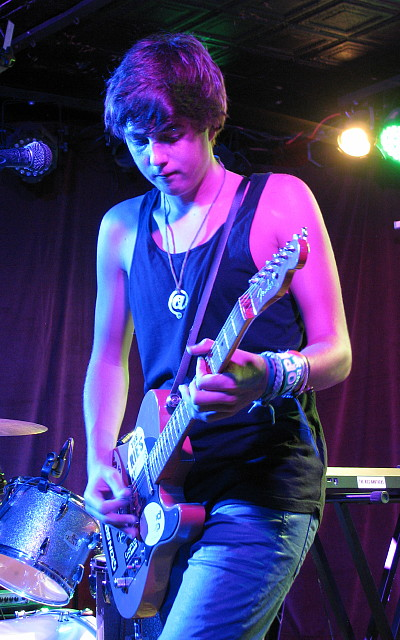
Kevin Ries performing at The Saint, Asbury Park, NJ on August 18, 2015.

Their music is a blend of pop, jazz, blues, classic and alternative rock.

The brothers come from a non-musician family. The Ries Brothers attended a high school online to accommodate the demands of their musical careers. Their early gigs consisted of playing covers of their parent's favorite classic rock bands' songs at "Crabby Bill's on the Beach" in Clearwater, Florida. An employee of the band Chicago heard them at one of those shows, establishing their connections to the band. The family coordinates almost all of their own booking and publicity. While interviewing potential management companies, they were taken aback when they heard their original songs altered and abbreviated by one company.

== Recent work ==
In 2018, they completed a 27-city tour in support of G. Love & Special Sauce. The same year, they appeared at the Gasparilla Music Festival in Tampa, Florida, SunFest in West Palm Beach, Florida, and the California Roots Music and Arts Festival in Monterey, California. They have twice toured nationally as the opening act for the iconic band CHICAGO and did a 15-city tour opening for the late Butch Trucks (Allman Brothers) & The Freight Train Band. The brothers headlined their second show at "The House that Les Paul Built", the legendary Iridium Jazz Club in New York City. They have sold out three headlining shows at Ruth Eckerd Hall's Murray Theatre in Clearwater, Florida. In the summer of 2013, the boys participated in the exclusive Los Angeles Grammy Museum's Music Revolution Project at Ruth Eckerd Hall. In the summer of 2014, the boys were a part of the Van's Warped Tour in Florida. The Ries Brothers were named by The Tampa Bay Times as one of their favorite artists of 2015 and by Creative Loafing as a 2016 "Breakout Artist". They have released three EP's and a Live Concert DVD. Their first full album The View From The Outside, produced by Ted Bowne of Passafire, was released on November 10, 2017.

== Personnel ==
- Charlie Ries (lead vocals, drums, and keyboard bass)
- Kevin Ries (background vocals and guitar)

== Discography ==
- Live in Clearwater, FL (2015)
- The View From The Outside (2017)
