= Tribal Theory =

Tribal Theory is a band based in San Diego, California. Formed in 2005, Tribal Theory blends their Pacific Island roots with reggae, rock, ska, and R&B influences to create a sound that spans multiple genres, including Island Reggae, Alternative, and World music. Tribal Theory has been described as the original Urban Reggae band.

== Early history ==
The original members - A.J. Blount, Dominic Blas, and Richard Duenas - began their musical journey as dancers in the Polynesian troupe Kaleo O'Nalani and the Guamanian cultural dance group Imahen Taotao Tano. The group initially performed under the name "Last Minute" before evolving into Tribal Theory with the addition of Seuko “Ku” Hawkins, Nico Tuilesu, and Paul Bowen. Several members have Guamanian roots, contributing to the band's multicultural influence. They were influenced by various artists, including Earth, Wind & Fire.

== Career milestones ==
Tribal Theory has performed alongside artists like Steel Pulse, Barrington Levy, The Wailing Souls, Fiji, and Collie Buddz. They have also shared stages with contemporary acts such as SOJA, Katchafire, and Common Kings. The band's self-titled debut EP was released in May 2011, recorded at Quino's Catacumba Studio and mixed by Wendell Ching. Their first full-length album, Hell of a Night, was released in August 2012 and won Best World Music Album at the 2013 San Diego Music Awards.

Over the years, Tribal Theory has headlined concerts across the West Coast, Hawaii, the Polynesian Islands, and Eastern Asia. The band has undergone several lineup changes, with Nico Tuilesu, Peter Cruz, and Rudy Duenas becoming the core members by 2018.

Tribal Theory has released multiple albums, including Cali Love (2013) and Reclamation (2016), which featured the songs "Burnin'" and "My Roots." They headlined the Mostraland festival in San Diego in 2022 to help raise money for The Leukemia & Lymphoma Society.

== Discography ==
- Tribal Theory (EP, 2011)
- Hell of a Night (Album, 2012)
- Cali Love (Album, 2013)
- Tribal Theory (Album, 2013)
- Reclamation (EP, 2016)
- "Burnin'" (Single, 2016)
- "Part Time Lovers" (Single, 2017)

== Tours and performances ==
- Vans Warped Tour (2011)
- Mr.2Nite Fall Tour (2014)
- Reggae on the River Festival
- Reggae Rise Up Festival
- Cali Roots Festival
- Hafa Fest
- Pala Vibes
- Reggae in The Hills
- Shoreline Jams
- Mayjah Rayjah

== Awards and honors ==
- San Diego Music Awards 2013 - Best World Music Album for Hell of a Night
- VANS Warped Tour Battle of the Bands Champions (2011)
- Orange County Mai Tai Rumble Champions (2013)

== Current members ==
- Nico Tuliesu – Lead vocals
- Peter Cruz – Lead guitar, backing vocals
- Rudy Duenas – Bass
- Seuko "Ku" Hawkins – Vocals
- Benjah Guzman – Keyboards
- Brian Baker – Drums
