= Josh Heinrichs =

American reggae singer/songwriter (born 1981)

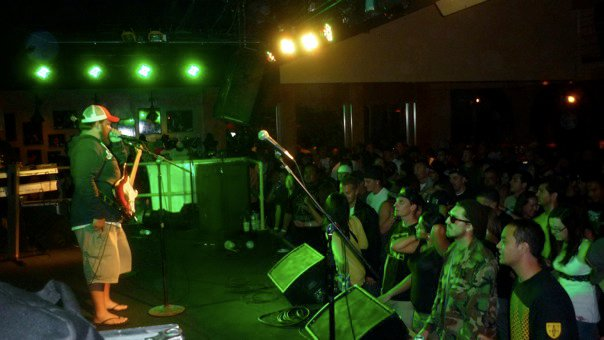
- Josh Heinrichs performing live in San Diego at The Soundwave

Background information
- Born: May 20, 1981 (age 45); Springfield, Missouri, United States
- Genres: Roots reggae, reggae, reggae rock
- Instruments: Vocals, Rhythm Guitar
- Years active: 1999 - present
- Label: GanJah Records
- Website: www.joshheinrichs.com

Josh Heinrichs is an American reggae singer/songwriter who was the former lead singer of internationally known indie reggae band, Jah Roots and current owner/operator of indie reggae record label, GanJah Records. Since leaving the band in 2008, Heinrichs has launched a successful solo career and has released several albums, including a number one Billboard charting release with Good Vibes in 2016.

== History ==
Junior Marvin of Bob Marley & The Wailers was quoted about Heinrichs, saying “Josh is one of those guys who comes along and fills his music with such an inspiration and with such energy that it translates so easily and positively to anyone hearing it. He is a rare talent in both his ability to craft a song with a certain timeless quality to it, and then, man, his voice, well, I mean, damn, the kid can sing as good as anyone out there; a bright future – that one.”

Heinrichs released his first solo EP in July 2009, "Things Change" a 6-song EP on GanJah Records.

In late 2009 Heinrichs released a statement that he had recorded a full album of reggae classics and covers entitled Favorites with friend Cas Haley due to be released in 2010 via Jim Slaton and his label, Big Karma Records, but the album was being indefinitely shelved due to Jim Slaton's untimely death from a heart attack. Although songs were used from the album for both Heinrichs' and Haley's 2010 albums.

In 2010 Heinrichs released his first live solo album, Live in Hawaii, recorded from his 2009 performance at The Kulia Roots Fest in Honolulu, Hawaii. Heinrichs was backed by the Hawaii reggae band Gomega for this performance.

On September 28, 2010, Heinrichs released his first solo studio album, Josh Heinrichs and Friends to a number four debut on USA iTunes Best Selling Reggae Albums. The album also debuted on Amazon's Top 20 Best Selling Reggae Albums. For this album Heinrichs worked with reggae artists, including Aston Barrett, Hani Totorewa of Katchafire, Caleb Keolanui of The Green, Koko of Inna Vision, Cas Haley and more.

On May 17, 2011, Heinrichs' second solo studio album, Jah Roots, was officially released internationally, debuting as Amazon's number one hottest-selling reggae album and at number six on iTunes(USA) Top 200 Best Selling Reggae Albums.

The Emergency Spliff album with Heinrichs former Jah Roots bandmate SkillinJah was officially released on August 16, 2011, and debuted at number 16 on iTunes Top 200 Best Selling Reggae Albums.

Satisfied, Heinrichs' third solo studio album, was released on October 18, 2011, and debuted at number three on iTunes Top 200 Best Selling Reggae Albums and as Amazons number two hottest-selling reggae album.

Reality, Heinrichs' second collaboration album with his former Jah Roots bandmate, SkillinJah, was released to a number six debut on iTunes and Amazon's Top Reggae Album on January 22, 2012.

In March 2012 Heinrichs brought Junior Marvin of Bob Marley and The Wailers to play lead guitar in his band for a very special one-night-only performance in Heinrichs' hometown of Springfield, Missouri.

In October 2012 Heinrichs brought Marlon Asher from Trinidad and Natural Vibrations from Hawaii to his hometown for his first annual Springfield, Missouri, Reggae festival.

The Rooftop Session EP was released March 26, 2013, and immediately debuted at number one on the iTunes Best selling reggae charts and debuted in its first week at number two on the Billboard Reggae Charts.

Good Vibes, Heinrichs' fourth solo studio album, was officially released March 11, 2016, and debuted at number one on the Billboard, iTunes and Amazon Reggae Charts.

The Best Yet, Heinrichs' first "Greatest Hits" album, was officially released November 25, 2016, and debuted at number 13 on the Billboard, number four on iTunes Reggae and number two on Amazon Reggae Charts.

== GanJah Records ==
GanJah Records is a midwest US reggae record company founded by Heinrichs and his wife, Kaytee. Writing, recording, producing and marketing independent reggae albums worldwide since 2001. To date they have released albums for Jah Roots, Josh Heinrichs, SkillinJah, 77 Jefferson and Lance Sitton and The Seed.

== Albums ==
Josh Heinrichs and Friends

On September 28, 2010, Heinrichs released his first studio album. Josh Heinrichs and Friends was released internationally on GanJah Records. The mostly duets album featured appearances by lifelong Bob Marley & The Wailers bassist Aston Barrett, Katchafire keyboardist and vocalist, Hani Totorewa, and America's Got Talent runner up, Cas Haley. The album also featured members of The Green, Inna Vision, Clear Conscience, 77 Jefferson and more.

The album debuted at number four on iTunes Top 200 Best Selling Reggae Albums.

On January 20, 2011, the music video for "New Love" Ft. Clear Conscience was officially released via Heinrichs' website, YouTube page and different reggae news websites.

On February 23, 2011, the second music video/single "These Days" Ft. 77 Jefferson, from Josh Heinrichs & Friends was officially released via Heinrichs website, YouTube page and different reggae news websites.

Jah Roots

On May 17, 2011 Jah Roots, Heinrichs' second studio album was released internationally on GanJah Records to a Top 10 debut on both Amazon and iTunes, actually debuting as Amazon's number one Hottest Reggae Album. The acoustically driven album is described by Heinrichs as "A collection of his favorite songs from the albums he wrote while in the band, Jah Roots".

Emergency Spliff

On August 16, 2011, Heinrichs' label, GanJah Records, released SkillinJah's first online album, Emergency Spliff, to a debut of number 16 on iTunes Best Selling Reggae Charts. The album, a mostly acoustic reggae album, featured SkillinJah in combination with his former Jah Roots bandmate and songwriting partner, Josh Heinrichs. The album was entirely co-written by SkillinJah and Heinrichs, during a summer get-together while SkillinJah had returned from his home in Brooklyn, New York, to where he was raised in Missouri to visit family and friends.

Satisfied

Heinrichs third solo album, was released October 18, 2011. The album debuted at number three on iTunes Top 200 Best Selling Reggae Albums and as Amazons number two Hottest Selling Reggae Album. The 12-track album recorded with the help of a full backing band and digital riddims, featured 3 guest appearances. SkillinJah, Heinrichs' former Jah Roots bandmate on two songs, "Ganja" and "Fight and Fuss", Rexie Adlawan of the Hawaiian reggae band, Inity Collective, joined Heinrichs for his first-ever duet with a female, for the song "What Can I Do", and New Zealander Regan Perry joins for the last song of the album, "Cruisin".

The first music video for the album, Satisfied (acoustic version), was released via the GanJah Records website on November 8, 2011.

The second music video, Crusin Ft Regan Perry, filmed entirely in New Zealand, was released November 26, 2011, via Josh Heinrichs and GanJah Records websites.

On February 19, 2012, the third music video Ganja Ft. SkillinJah was officially released via Heinrichs website, YouTube page and different reggae news websites.

Reality

SkillinJah "Reality" was released on January 22, 2012, debuting at nimber six on iTunes and Amazon's Top USA Reggae Albums.

Like SkillinJah's previous album Emergency Spliff, Reality was entirely co-written by SkillinJah and Heinrichs, with this album featuring a full backing band, differing to the Emergency Spliff, which was an all-acoustic album. The album received favorable reviews from Reggaeville.com, TheDubSide.com and ThePier.org.

On January 8, the first official music video for the first single "Skilla Dan Dem" was officially released via GanJah Records website.

Rooftop Session EP

Heinrichs' Rooftop Session EP was released March 26, 2013, debuted at number one on the iTunes Best selling reggae charts and debuted in its first week at number two on the Billboard Reggae Charts.

High On Love EP

Heinrichs' High on Love EP was released early on July 22 via Heinrichs' successful online pledgemusic.com campaign to fans who donated to the album recording and 2013 summer tour with Tribal Seeds. The album was officially released Aug 6, 2013, debuted atnumber four on the iTunes Best selling reggae charts and debuted in its first week in the top 20 on the Billboard Reggae Charts.

Good Vibes

Heinrichs fourth solo album, was released March 11, 2016. The album debuted at number one on The Billboard Reggae Chart, iTunes Reggae and Amazon Reggae charts and for this was mentioned in both of Jamaica's top newspapers, The Jamaica Gleaner and The Jamaica Observer. The 10-track album recorded with the help of producer Miles Brown, features 4 guest appearances. SkillinJah, Heinrichs' former Jah Roots bandmate guests on the song "High Grade". Inna Vision, a Hawaiian reggae band, guests on the song "Make A Way. "Like An Angel" features E.N Young on the Melodica and the last song of the album Start With Yourself features all 3 of Heinrichs' children, Kaya; Aston and Olivia on guest harmony vocals at the end of the song.

The first music video for the album, "Puff Herbs" was released before the album dropped to help promote the release dates via GanJah Records YouTube page on February 18, 2016.

The Best Yet

The Best Yet, Heinrichs' first "Greatest Hits" album, was officially released November 25, 2016, and debuted at number 13 on the Billboard, number four on iTunes Reggae and number two on Amazon Reggae Charts.

Made In California EP

Heinrichs teamed up with his long time musical collaborator, SkillinJah for this 2018 EP. The 5 song EP that features both artists on every song, officially dropped May 20, 2018, and featured guest performances by Polynesian Reggae artists, Dread Kennedy, Inna Vision and Preston Lee. The album was recorded, produced, mixed and mastered in Los Angeles, California by Ryan "Gonzo" Gonzalez of Tribal Seeds, Aaron Kaili (produced for Sammy J and Jordan T), Studio 637 and Jesse Mestas. The album debuted at number four on the Billboard Reggae Charts.

The first music video for the album, "Cannabis (Acoustic) [feat. Inna Vision & Dread Kennedy Peneueta-PeaPea]" was filmed, recorded and edited by Studio 637 in Los Angeles, California. The video is a live acoustic performance that is also featured on the EP. The video was released March 17, 2018, to help promote the upcoming release date of the official EP via the GanJah Records YouTube page. The second music video for the album Peaceful Conference, was shot in and around Lake Springfield (Missouri). The video was officially released on May 20, the same day the album was released to help promote the release. The video was filmed, edited and made by Miles Brown of 77 Jefferson. The third music video made from the album was for the studio version of Cannabis which features Inna Vision. The video was filmed in Huntington Beach, California, by Garret Laver and released via YouTube on December 7, 2018.

Resist EP

Heinrichs returned with SkillinJah for this 2020 EP. Released on February 14, 2020. The album immediately debuted at number one on iTunes Reggae charts and at number 33 in the top 40 overall on iTunes. The album features guest appearances by Nattali Rize, Bobby Hustle & the band Artikal Sound System. The album was entirely written and recorded in Boynton Beach, Florida at Chris Montague studio. The album artwork features a mix of different visual political & social issues with Heinrichs & SkillinJah standing in the middle of the image with the word RESIST.

Rollercoaster Single

Heinrichs & SkillinJah's second release for 2020. This single was recorded and produced by Miles Brown between Springfield and Kansas City, Missouri. The single debuted at number one on iTunes Reggae singles chart the day it was released December 8, 2020. The single artwork was created by Miles Brown as well.

Josh Heinrichs

The 2021 self-titled album found Heinrichs teamed up with his long-time musical collaborator & producer, Miles Brown (Drummer & Producer for his own band 77 Jefferson). The 13-song album featured all-new original songs by Heinrichs and had no features or guest appearances other than his children on the last track "Numidia". Josh's son, Aston plays the slide guitar on the song, and his daughters, Kaya and Olivia sing the backup vocals. The album was recorded between Heinrichs home studio and Brown's studio in Kansas City during the 2020 and 2021 Covid lockdown with the two sending files back and forth via the internet for months and not actually ever seeing each other physically at all during the entire making of the album. The album was released on May 21, 2021, and immediately shot to number one on the iTunes Reggae chart.

The first music video for the album, "Feel's Good" was filmed, recorded, and edited by Yunggtrip in and around Venice Beach and Los Angeles, California in June 2022. The official music video dropped on July 1, 2022. The lyric video for "Lifted" was filmed simultaneously with the "Feels Good" music video and was released July 12, 2022.

== Billboard chart appearances ==
Year	Artist	Title	Chart category	Peak position	Role
2013	Josh Heinrichs	"Rooftop Session"	Billboard Reggae	No. 2	Writer/performer/co-producer
2013	Josh Heinrichs	"High On Love"	Billboard Reggae	No. 11	Writer/performer/co-producer
2016	Josh Heinrichs	"Good Vibes"	Billboard Reggae	No. 1	Writer/performer/co-producer
2016	Josh Heinrichs	"The Best Yet"	Billboard Reggae	No. 13	Writer/performer/co-producer
2018	Josh Heinrichs	"Made in California"	Billboard Reggae	No. 4	Writer/performer/co-producer

== Solo touring ==
Heinrichs has toured successfully as a solo artist. Touring the entire US and Hawaii multiple times. Heinrichs also toured in Guam in January 2015. Heinrichs toured California with Ooklah The Moc in 2010, with a finale show at the world-famous Roxy Theatre (West Hollywood). Heinrichs toured Florida and Georgia in December 2010 with MTV alumni Jimi Haha of the band Jimmie's Chicken Shack Heinrichs has also toured in Hawaii three times between 2009 - 2011, solo in 2009, with Cas Haley in 2010 and with J Boog and Anuhea in 2011. In 2011 Heinrichs embarked on a coast-to-coast US tour w/ Mike Pinto ending with a CD release show in DiPiazza's in Long Beach, California. In 2012 Heinrichs toured Florida with Bam Margera, also performed at the California Roots Festival and Reggae In The Hills Festival with his GanJah Records label mates(77 Jefferson, Lance Sitton and SkillinJah) and also did a special benefit performance with Kyle McDonald and C-Money of Slightly Stoopid in Seattle. In May 2013 Heinrichs opened the California Roots festival with his label mates SkillinJah and 77 Jefferson. In July and August he toured the midwest and east coast USA with Tribals Seeds and label mate SkillinJah In March 2014 Heinrichs performed a special one-night show in Honolulu, Hawaii, with Father Psalms backing band at The Republik. In May 2014 Heinrichs performed again at The California Roots Festival on the main stage. In 2015 Heinrichs performed at the Trenchfest Festival in Guam alongside Iration, Fortunate Youth and The Green. In May 2016 Heinrichs performed for his fourth time at California Roots Festival. In August 2016 he performed at Thunder Vibes Festival alongside Michael Franti and Hirie in Lincoln, California. In September 2016 Heinrichs played The Shoreline Jam Festival in Long Beach, California, alongside Tribal Seeds, J Boog and Iration. In January 2017, Heinrichs performed in the territory of Guam for his second time, once again at The Trenchfest Festival alongside Katchafire and Fortunate Youth. March to late May 2017, Heinrichs was direct support for Fortunate Youth's spring album release tour. Heinrichs started 2018 with an eight-date California tour that included a performance at One Love Cali Reggae Fest 2018 and a sold out debut performance at The Observatory in Santa Ana, California. For this tour Heinrichs assembled a 10 piece band including back up singers and horns.

== Discography ==
- 'Big Hits w/ Phen' album (2001)
- 'Steppin Out of Babylon w/ Jah Roots' album (2002)
- 'More Herbs for the Youth w/ Jah Roots' album (2005)
- 'Babylon Weak Heart w/ SkillinJah w/ Jah Roots' album (2005)
- Crucial (album) w/ Jah Roots album (2006)
- Joy (Jah Roots album) w/ Jah Roots album (2008)
- 'Things Change' - EP (2009)
- 'Favorites' w/ Cas Haley unreleased album (2009)
- 'Live in Hawaii' album (2010)
- 'Josh Heinrichs & Friends' album (2010)
- 'Jah Roots' album (2011)
- 'Emergency Spliff w/ SkillinJah' album (2011)
- 'Satisfied' album (2011)
- 'Reality w/ SkillinJah' album (2012)
- 'Rooftop Session' - EP (2013)
- Sweet Sensi with Fortunate Youth (2013)
- 'High on Love' - EP (2013)
- Signs appearance with SkillinJah & Nowlege (2014)
- Star Gazing appearance with Zack Mufasa (2015)
- 'Good Vibes' album (2016)
- 'The Best Yet' album (2016)
- So High appearance with Arise Roots, Marlon Asher & SkillinJah (2017)
- Made in California - EP w/ SkillinJah (2018)
- Easy Road appearance with Artikal Sound System (2018)
- Revolution appearance with Inna Vision (2018)
- Good Vibes appearance with Nowlege & SkillinJah (2019)
- Resist - EP w/ SkillinJah (2020)
- Can't Wait appearance with Soul Majestic (2020)
- Rollercoaster - Single w/ SkillinJah (2020)
- So Crucial - Single w/ Tuff Lion, Leno Banton & SkillinJah (2021)
- Herbs, You & Me - Single w/ SkillinJah & Freddy For Peace (2021)
- Use My Mind - Single from 'Cali Roots Riddim 2021' album. Produced by Collie Buddz (2021)
- Gunman - Single w/ SkillinJah (2021)
- ‘Josh Heinrichs’ - Self-titled album (2021)
- Just Cool - Single w/ Hale' (2022)
- New Day - Single w/ Gary Dread of The Movement (2022)
- Fade Away - Single w/ Bobby Hustle (2022)
- Harvest - Single w/ Lopaka Rootz & SkillinJah (2022)
- You Can Heal Your Life - Single w/ Inna Vision (2023)
- 'Acoustic Sesh' album (2023)
- Kush - Single w/ Soul Rebel Project (2024)
- Valerie - Single (2024)
- The Man Who Got So High - Single with Aston Heinrichs (2024)
