= Fortunate Youth =

American reggae rock band

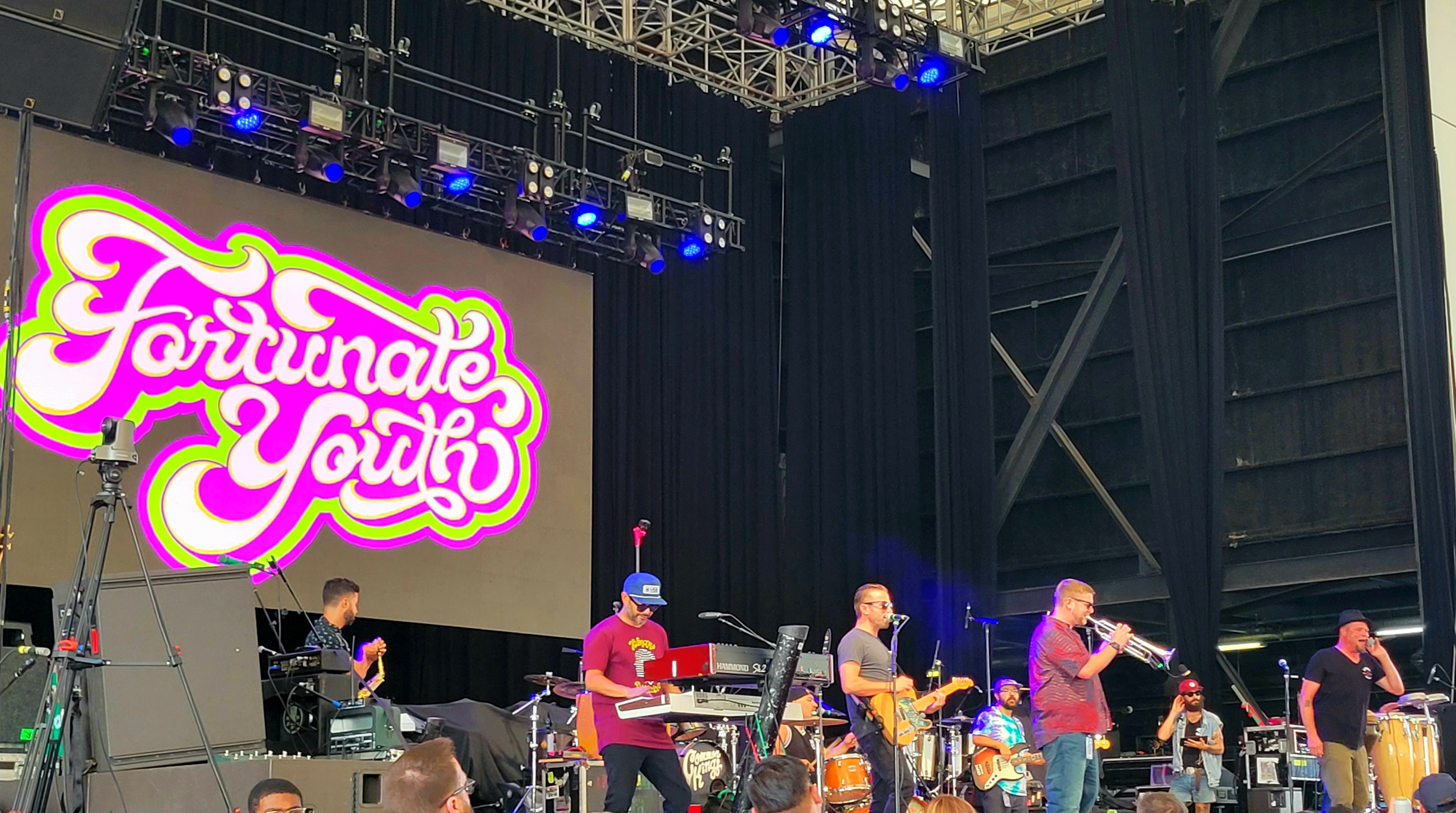
- Fortunate Youth performing in Boston in 2022

Background information
- Origin: Hermosa Beach, California, U.S.
- Genres: Reggae, reggae rock, roots reggae
- Years active: 2009–present
- Labels: Fortunate Youth Entertainment; Controlled Substance Sound Labs
- Members: Dan Kelly; Jered Draskovich; Corey Draskovich; Travis Walpole; Greg Gelb; Revelation Kalauli
- Past members: Ryan Gonzales; Myles Poydras; Sam Mandelbaum; Joey Muraoka; Evan Hein; Jordan D. Rosenthal
- Website: fortunate-youth.com

Fortunate Youth is an American reggae rock sextet from Hermosa Beach, California.

== History ==
=== Formation and Up-Lifted EP (2009–2010) ===
Fortunate Youth was formed in 2009 in Hermosa Beach, California by Travis Walpole, Dan Kelly, Jered Draskovich, Corey Draskovich and Greg Gelb during the birthday party of their friend and longtime manager, Jared Segawa. Gelb, Walpole, and Gonzales, along with Jered and Corey Draskovich, attended Mira Costa High School together prior to the band's formation. While in Rude Boy Roots Travis Walpole & Manager Jared Segawa witnessed singer Dan Kelly perform at an Open Mic Night in Hermosa Beach and recruited him to join the band. After their disbandment the remaining members (Walpole, Draskovich and Kelly) brought on Jered's younger brother Corey and Greg Gelb, who were members of the band Irie State of Mind, to play bass. They also added Ryan "Gonzo" Gonzales on guitar and Myles Poydras on drums.

Ever since the band's formation, Fortunate Youth is devoted to its roots with one simple mission; "spread peace, love, and unity with music". They released their first EP, Up-Lifted, on January 8, 2010.

=== Irie State of Mind and It's All A Jam (2011–2013) ===
One year later on July 11, 2011, Fortunate Youth released their debut album Irie State of Mind, premiering at #2 on the iTunes reggae charts and peaking at #13 on Billboard's Top 100 Reggae Albums Chart.

The artwork and conceptual layout for the album was developed and created by Redondo Beach, California artist and photographer Mike Davids, a close friend of the band. That same year, Fortunate Youth supported Tribal Seeds during their Tribal Youth Tour, and released their first single "One Love" in November 2011. The band also toured briefly with Hawaii-based reggae band The Green.

In 2012, Fortunate Youth toured with The Expendables and Tribal Seeds while heavily promoting Irie State of Mind. In September that year, Fortunate Youth performed a stripped-down acoustic set featuring songs from both the Up-Lifted EP and Irie State of Mind during a Moboogie Loft Session. They released an album version of this performance titled, Moboogie Loft Session with Fortunate Youth on December 18, 2012. During 2012, the band headlined their own Nationwide Sweet Summer Love Tour, as well as four shows in Costa Rica, marking their first overseas performances.

They released their sophomore album, It's All A Jam on March 19, 2013. The album peaked at number one on the Billboard Reggae chart, number 10 at the Billboard Pacific Heatseekers Chart, number 23 at the Billboard National Heatseekers Chart, number one on the iTunes Reggae Charts and number 46 on the iTunes Overall chart.

In 2013, Fortunate Youth headlined a nationwide tour with fifty-five shows and played the California Roots Music and Arts Festival.

=== Don't Think Twice (2014–2016) ===
Fortunate Youth headlined a tour in the spring of 2014, and headlined the 2014 Fall With Friends Tour accompanied by supporting acts such as The Steppas, New Kingston, Ashes of Babylon, Thrive, and The Expanders.

The band released a six-song extended play, The Dub Collections, Vol. 1 that same year and began recording their third album, Don't Think Twice, which was released on May 5, 2015. The album hit the #1 spot on both the Billboard and iTunes Reggae charts at the time of its release, and kicked off a "Don't Think Twice Fall Tour" that October. While discussing the album, Kelly stated the meaning behind the record was, "Don't think twice, we all end up at the same place. If you look at the back of the album, two roads come back into each other. Y'know, no matter what you think, it's all gonna be...alright."

In 2016, the band released their first official music video entitled "Burn One". The video was filmed at the members' place of residence in Redondo Beach by Jeff Pliskin. A second video for the album,"One Love," was filmed by the same director.

That same year, they released Love Is The Most High, a compilation of love songs near Valentine's Day. Then quickly released their third EP, Dub Collections, Vol. 2 and began recording their self-titled fourth album at 17th Street Recording Studio in Costa Mesa, California, where they had previously recorded Irie State of Mind, It's All A Jam, and Don't Think Twice. Fortunate Youth was added as a supporting act in Stick Figure's 2016 Set In Stone tour.

=== Self-titled album & Live From California (2017–2020) ===
In January 2017, they released a music video for "Left My Love In California." On February 3, they released another music video for the song "Friends and Family." On February 10, Fortunate Youth released their eponymous fourth album. The album peaked at #1 on the iTunes and Billboard Reggae Albums charts, and #29 on the Billboard Independent Albums chart. It remained in the Top 10 for five weeks. The album featured artists such as Slightly Stoopid and Kumar Bent.

On March 2, the band released yet another music video, "Things", and launched their Spring Tour to promote their fourth album on March 16, 2017, in Ventura, California, with supporting acts such as Josh Heinrichs, Iya Terra, and For Peace Band. On May 26, 2017, they released the music video for "Vibes".

In 2019, they collaborated with reggae musician Half Pint to record on their instrumental of "Pass the Herb." The collaboration was released as a limited edition vinyl on Raised Fist Records during their subsequent tour, in addition to a music video being released by Jeff Pliskin. The band added Hawaii's Revelation Kalauli on drums after the departure of Jordan Rosenthal.

The band held an annual Thanksgiving show at Hermosa Beach venue Saint Rocke as a tribute to their city of origin from 2011 to 2019. Saint Rocke closed in 2020 as a result of statewide closures during the COVID-19 pandemic. On May 22, 2020, Fortunate Youth released a live album titled, Live From California, a 20-song live performance set featuring the band's greatest hits. In January 2021, Fortunate Youth was one of several reggae and punk bands on The House That Bradley Built, a charity compilation honoring Sublime's lead singer Bradley Nowell, helping musicians with substance abuse. They covered Sublime's song "Jailhouse" on Disc 2 of the Deluxe Edition.

=== Good Times (Roll On) (2021–present) ===
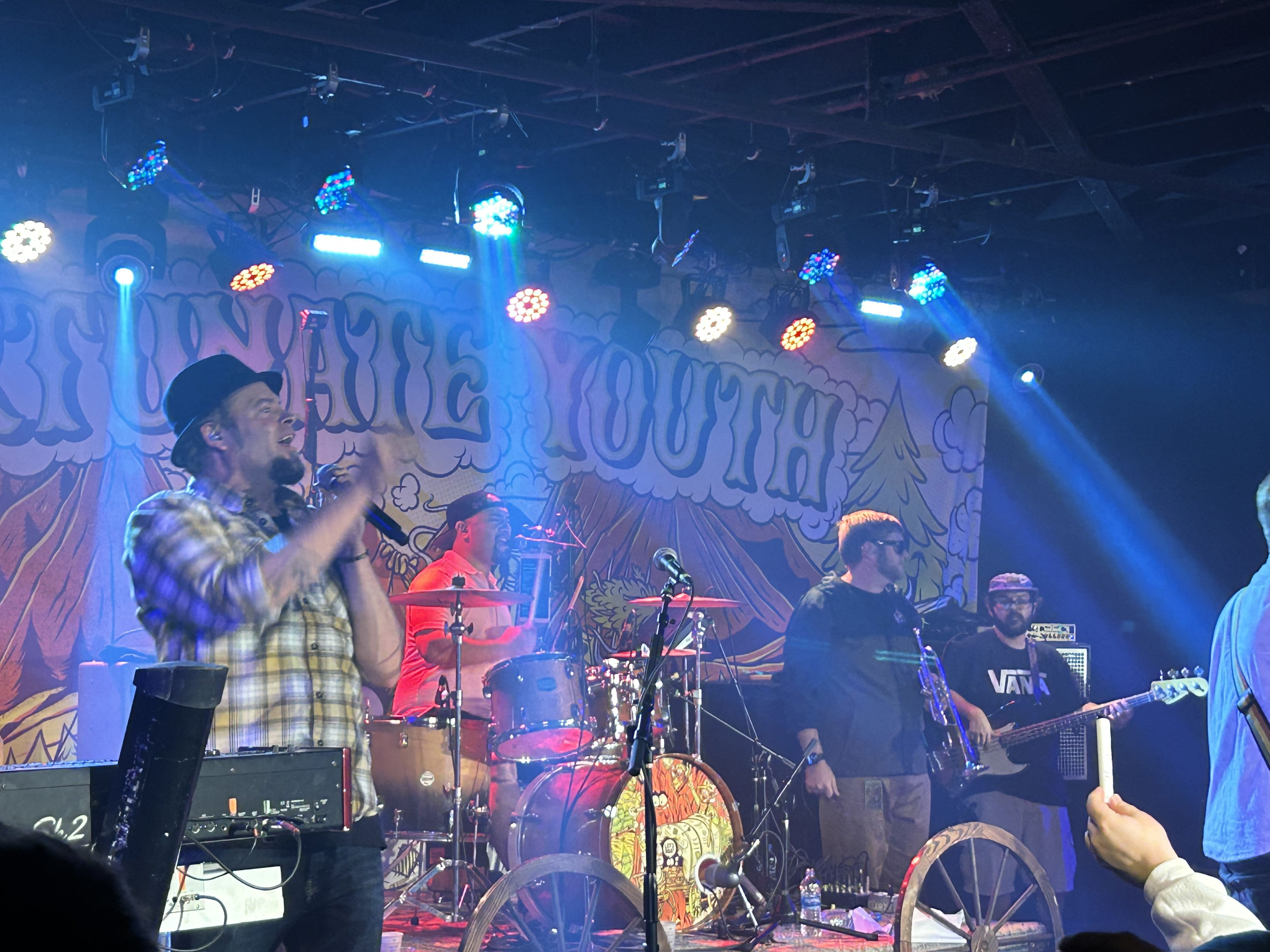
Fortunate Youth performing at the Stone Pony in Asbury Park, NJ in 2022.

Fortunate Youth recorded their fifth album, Good Times (Roll On), which released on September 30, 2021. Starting in July 2020, mid-lockdown during the COVID-19 pandemic, the album went through pre-production recordings at Kona Town Studio in Redondo Beach, California and then they tracked key essentials at the legendary Total Access Recording (Sublime, Pennywise). The band also worked with reggae producer Lewis Richards at 17th Street Studios in Costa Mesa, California and tracked the horns remotely at Kromatic Sound recording studio on the east coast.

Jered Draskovich describes the album's title, "We are all living through this global event and to me we chose the title to help ensure that 'Good Times' are indeed going to 'Roll On' regardless of all the hardships that our recent environment has provided for everyone." Instead of three to four weeks, they worked on the album for nine months. Cory Draskovich adds, "2020 was a tough year, especially for the touring music industry. With the down time at home, we were able to spread out the sessions and take our time."

The 12 track album features special guests including, FY's touring horn section (trumpet and saxophone), Nathan Feinstein of Iya Terra, former FY guitarist, Gonzo currently of Tribal Seeds on background vocals, Italy's reggae twins Mellow Mood, and Skillinjah & Dread Kennedy.

According to FY's Facebook page, Good Times (Roll On) is being considered for the 64th Annual Grammy Awards for Best Reggae Album.

== Musical Influences ==
The band has incorporated a wide variety of influences, including blues, ska, rock and punk into their sound, and cite acts such as Bob Marley, Katchafire, Van Morrison and The Grateful Dead as various influences.

== Other projects ==
Since 2013, Fortunate Youth teamed up with L.A. Ale Works to create a special beer and 40-ounce can; first starting with a double-dry pale ale named "Sweet Sensi" after their song from It's All A Jam album. Next they developed a dry-hopped lager called "Live Life" from their 2019 EP of the same name. Then to commemorate the band's 2021 album, the brewing company came out with "Let the Good Times Roll On", a hazy IPA infused with pineapple and guava juice.

In October 2021, Fortunate Youth teamed up with The Wine Boss (Paso Robles) for a limited edition and hand numbered bottles of Cabernet Franc and Chenin Blanc, both named after their latest album, "Good Times Roll On". The 2018 Cabernet Franc O.G. edition bottle features dark berries, herbs and spices, while the 2019 Chenin Blanc blue edition bottle features flavors of citrus and pear. Both bottles are numbered to 200.

Fortunate Youth teamed up with Dixxon Flannel Co. for a collaboration of a men's woven, short sleeve button up "party shirt". It's a black shirt with the band's mascot, a green, red, and yellow banana smoking a joint as a print throughout the shirt, as well as a left chest pocket with a Fortunate Youth brand tag.

== Lineup ==
The lineup has no set designated musician, and all members rotate positions within the band during live performances.

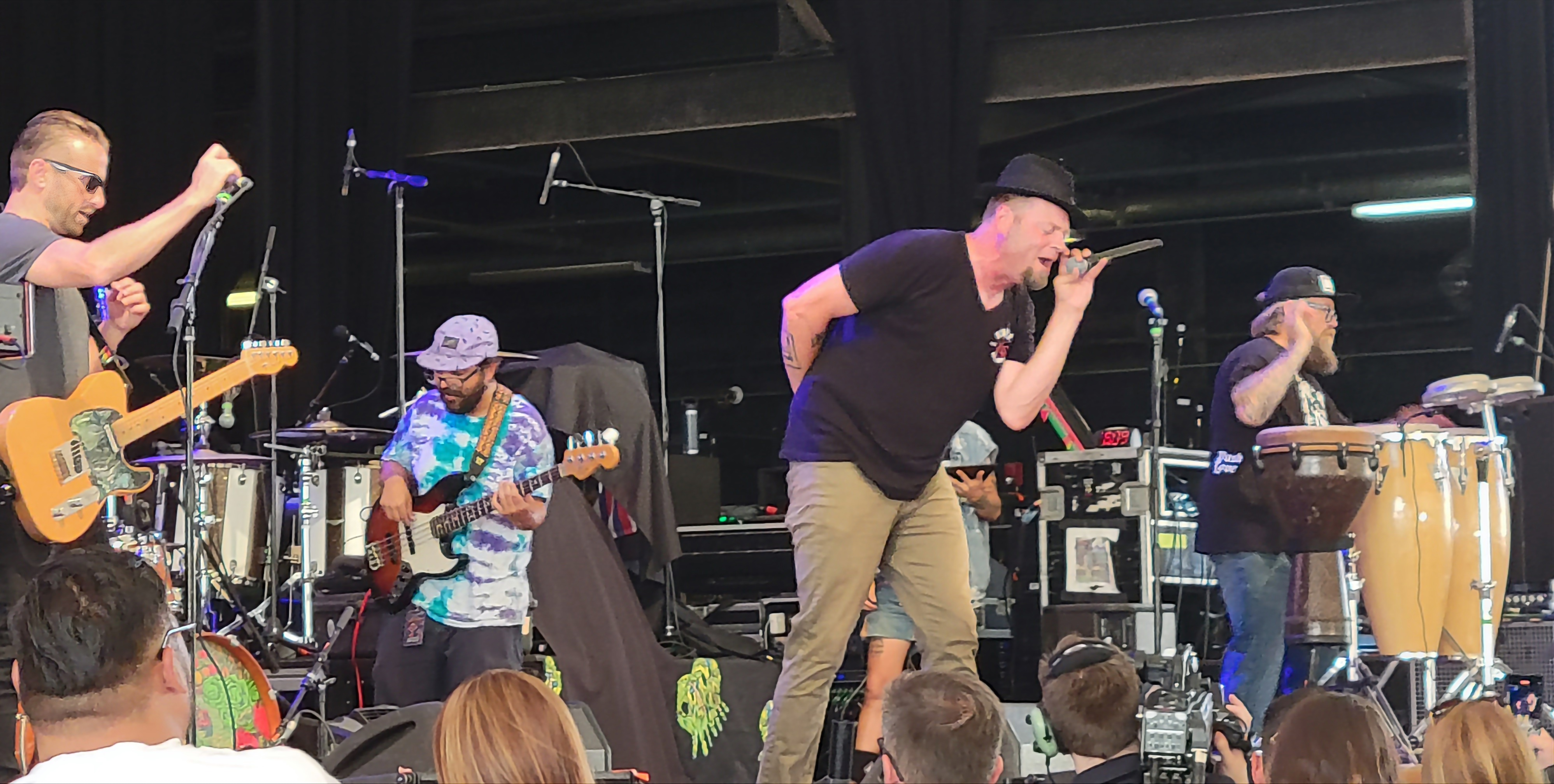
Fortunate Youth performing in Boston, MA (Summer Traditions Tour July 2022)

=== Current band members ===
- Dan Kelly – Lead Vocals (2009–Present)
- Travis "Travi Bongo" Walpole – Percussion, Guitar, Backing Vocals (2009–Present)
- Jered Draskovich – Keyboard, Bass (2009–Present)
- Greg Gelb – Bass, Guitar (2009–Present)
- Corey Draskovich – Guitar, Bass Keyboard (2009–Present)
- Revelation Kalauli – Drums (2019–Present)

=== Past band members ===
- Ryan "Gonzo" Gonzales – Lead Guitar, Backing Vocals (2009–2011)
- Myles Poydras – Drums (2009–2010)
- Sam Mandelbaum – Drums (2011–2013)
- Evan Hein – Bass (2012)
- Jordan D. Rosenthal – Drums (2013–2018)
- Joey "Hawaiiantist" Muraoka – Drums (2014)
- CB "Machomidz" Wilson- Guest Percussion (Aug 5 2023)

== Discography ==
=== Studio albums ===
Fortunate Youth Chart History
Year	Album	Label	Billboard peak
2011	Irie State of Mind	Independent Records	No. 13
2013	It's All A Jam	Self-produced	No. 1
2015	Don't Think Twice	Self-produced	No. 1
2017	Fortunate Youth	Fortunate Entertainment	No. 1
2021	Good Times (Roll On)	Controlled Substance Sound Labs	
2025	Love For The Music	Self-produced	

=== Extended Plays (EPs) ===
Fortunate Youth Chart History
Year	Album	Label	Billboard peak
2010	Up-Lifted EP	Self-produced	—
2014	Dub Collections, Vol. 1 EP	Self-produced	No. 3
2016	Love Is The Most High EP	Self-produced	—
2016	Dub Collections, Vol. 2 EP	Self-produced	No. 6
2019	Live Life EP	Fortunate Entertainment	No. 2

=== Live albums ===
Chart History
Year	Album	Label	Billboard peak
2012	Moboogie Loft Sessions (Live Acoustic)	Independent Records	—
2017	Sugarshack Sessions, Vol. 1 (Live Acoustic)	Sugarshack Records	No. 1
2018	Sugarshack Sessions, Vol. 2 (Live Acoustic)	Sugarshack Records	No. 1
2019	Sugarshack Sessions, Vol. 3 (Live Acoustic)	Sugarshack Records	No. 1
2020	Live From California	Fortunate Entertainment	—

=== Singles ===
Title	Release date	Album
"Salvation"	2010	Up-Lifted EP
"Earthquake"	2010	Up-Lifted EP
"Burn One"	2010	Up-Lifted EP
"Trippin"	2011	Irie State of Mind
"Love is the Most High"	2011	Irie State of Mind
"Skankin"	2011	Irie State of Mind
"Reggae Radio"	2011	Irie State of Mind
"Jah Music" (feat. Matt Liufau)	2011	Irie State of Mind
"Sweet Love"	2011	Irie State of Mind
"Alibi"	2011	Irie State of Mind
"Farmer" (feat. Juan Rios)	2011	Irie State of Mind
"Tossin"	2011	Irie State of Mind
"Bastard" (feat. Susie Fiufau)	2011	Irie State of Mind
"One Love" (Live Acoustic)	2012	Moboogie Loft Sessions
"Burn One" (Live Acoustic)	2012	Moboogie Loft Sessions
"Peace Love Unity" (Live Acoustic)	2012	Moboogie Loft Sessions
"Sweet Sensi" (feat. Josh Heinrichs, Steven Jacobo & Steffano Lasso)	2013	It's All A Jam
"So Rebel"	2013	It's All A Jam
"Till The End"	2013	It's All A Jam
"Positive"	2013	It's All A Jam
"Ali's Song"	2013	It's All A Jam
"Peace Love Unity" (feat. Zion Thompson of The Green)	2013	It's All A Jam
"Some Might Say"	2013	It's All A Jam
"Vibration Dub"	2013	It's All A Jam
"Love Won't Leave Me Alone"	2013	It's All A Jam
"Pass the Herb" (feat. The Green & Marlon "Ganja Farmer" Asher)	2015	Don't Think Twice
"Vibes"	2015	Don't Think Twice
"My Love"	2015	Don't Think Twice
"Wasting Away"	2015	Don't Think Twice
"Midnight Lover"	2015	Don't Think Twice
"All Night" (feat. The Expanders)	2015	Don't Think Twice
"Left My Love In California"	2017	Fortunate Youth
"Friends & Family"	2017	Fortunate Youth
"Things"	2017	Fortunate Youth
"One & Only"	2017	Fortunate Youth
"Irie State" (feat. Slightly Stoopid)	2017	Fortunate Youth
"Dial My Number" (feat. Kumar Bent)	2017	Fortunate Youth
"Young & Innocent" (feat. Half Pint)	May 3, 2019	(Single)
"Live Life" (feat. Alborosie & Harrison Stafford of Groundation)	2019	Live Life EP
"Jailhouse" (Sublime cover)	January 15, 2021	The House That Bradley Built (Single)
"Around The World" (feat. Mellow Mood)	June 11, 2021	Good Times (Roll On) (Single)
"Good Times (Roll On)"	July 23, 2021	Good Times (Roll On) (Single)
"Sunlight"	August 20, 2021	Good Times (Roll On) (Single)
"Groovin" (feat. Iya Terra)	September 17, 2021	Good Times (Roll On) (Single)
Riddim Rydah (feat. Skillinjah & Dread Kennedy)	2021	Good Times (Roll On)

== Collaborations ==
Dan Kelly (Fortunate Youth) has collaborated or was featured on songs with artists and bands throughout the years.

- Tomorrow's Bad Seeds – "iBurn" (4/7/2022)
- Kyle Smith – "My Friend" (4/9/2021)
- New Reb – "Fly Away" (3/11/2021)
- Roots of Creation – "Casey Jones" (Grateful Dead Cover) (7/3/2020)
- Fluid Foundation – "All or Nothin" (2/10/2019)
- Treehouse! – "Natural High" (11/4/2018)
- Seedless – "I Just Want To Know" (feat. Essel) (9/29/2016)
  - Seedless – "The Light" (8/28/2010)
- Thick As Thieves – "Dance In Heaven" (feat. David Ornelas) (3/4/2015)
- Arise Roots – "Lost In Your Ocean" (2014)
- 77 Jefferson – "On The Run" (5/17/2012)
