= Cas Haley =

American singer-songwriter (born 1980)

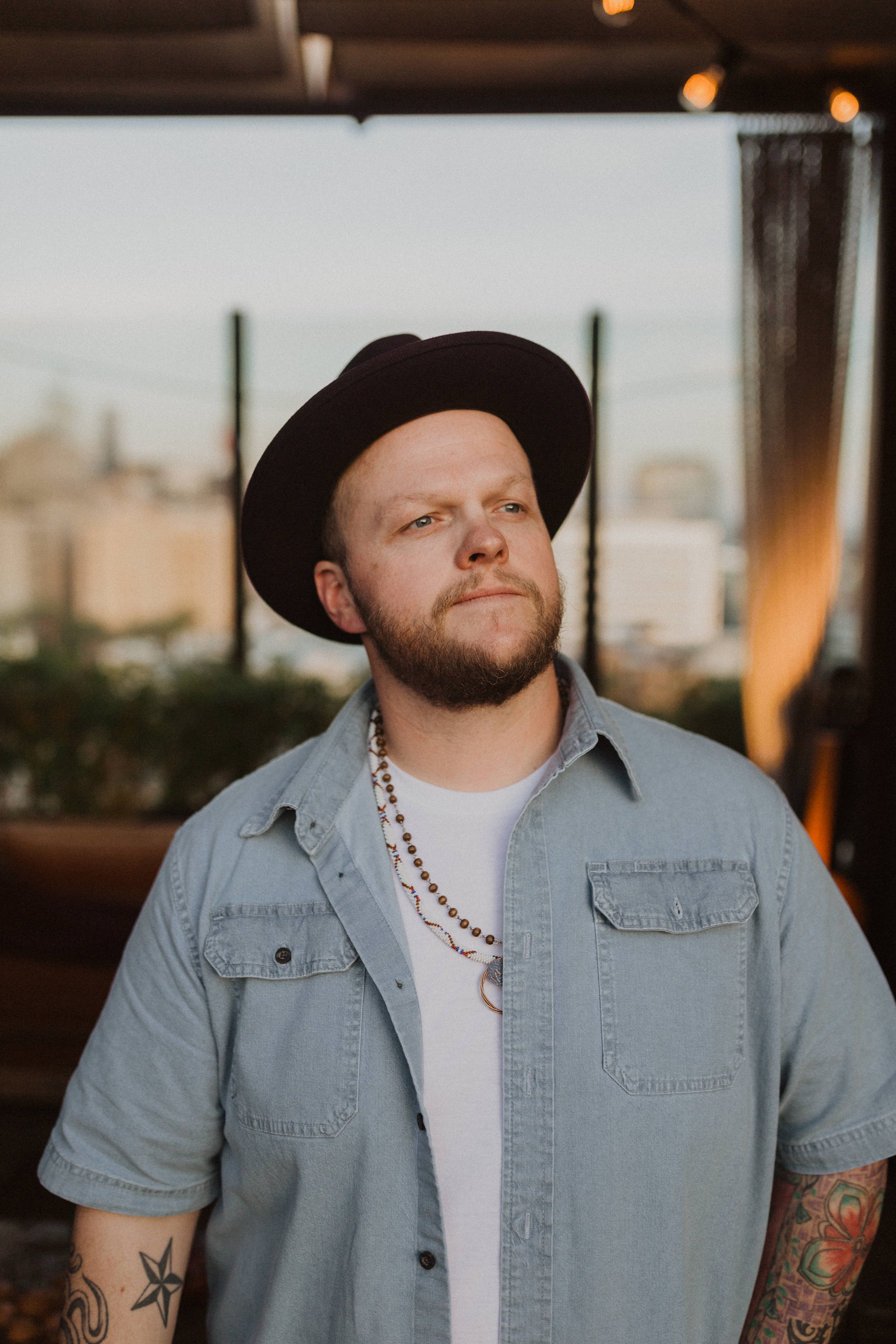
- Cas Haley, singer-songwriter & winner of Lincoln "Chart Your Course" competition

Background information
- Born: Benjamin Cas Haley; December 27, 1980 (age 45); Paris, Texas, U.S.
- Genres: folk, rock, blues, reggae
- Occupation: Singer/songwriter
- Instruments: vocals, guitar, piano, bass, drums
- Years active: 1998–present
- Labels: Cartel Records (2008–2010); Easy Star (2010–2013); Mailboat Records (2015–present)

Cas Haley (born as Benjamin Cas Haley in 1980; Paris, Texas) is an American singer-songwriter, who specialises in reggae-inflected music when singing. He rose to national prominence by appearing on America's Got Talent in 2007, finishing as runner-up on that season's competition, whereupon he has conducted several tours and produced several albums during his career with a number of different recording labels.

== Career ==
Haley began his career developing pieces inspired by reggae music. In 2007, he auditioned for the second season of America's Got Talent, conducting several songs with his reggae-inflected music; his first for his audition earned praise from Piers Morgan, a judge for the program at the time, who praised his version of "Walking on the Moon" as being far better than when it had been sung by the musician Sting. His performances earned him national recognition, leading to him finishing the competition as runner-up. After his involvement on the program, he released a self-titled debut album later in the year, reaching No. 8 on Billboard's Reggae Albums chart.

In June 2010, Haley toured Hawaii with Josh Heinrichs playing shows in Hawaii, in which he made appearances on several local radio programs and the television morning news portion of Hawaii News Now. Three months later, he signed a deal with Easy Star Records, who released his follow-up album, Connection, on September 14. It reached No. 2 on Billboard's Reggae Albums chart in 2010. In October, he toured the U.S. west coast and Europe in support of Connection with the Easy Star All-Stars.

Haley released his third album, La Si Dah, on May 28, 2013, which consisted of thirteen songs, funded by his fans, and produced by both Haley and Grammy-winning producer-engineer Rob Fraboni. The release was followed by a European tour. Later that same year, Cas was nominated as best reggae rock entertainer for the 32nd annual International Reggae and World Music Awards.

In 2014, Haley suffered a skiing accident that left serious muscle and nerve damage in his neck. He endured eight months of acupuncture and vocal and physical therapy to get his voice back. The following year, on November 6, he released the album More Music More Family on Jimmy Buffett's Mailboat Records. Nine of its 12 songs were recorded in Hawaii, and three were recorded in Haley's home in Texas and filmed as part of a video series for the Dallas News.

On June 21, 2019, Haley released Lessons and Blessings, which was written during the time of his wife's illness. It was recorded at the Haley family farm, and his wife contributed to the songwriting.

In 2020, Cas Haley was the grand prize winner of the Lincoln Motor Company's "Chart Your Course" contest. His winning song, "Every Road I'm On," beat out over 1,600 entrants. Haley won a talent contract and a recording session at Capitol Studios, a Lincoln Corsair, and appeared in a national Lincoln marketing campaign. As part of the promotion, Haley met and worked with actor Matthew McConaughey, and musicians Jon Cleary, Tank of Tank and the Bangas, Ruthie Foster, and more. Lincoln filmed his cross-country journey, which ended at Capitol Studios in Hollywood, where he recorded the song. The campaign includes a national broadcast and online spot and a 24-minute documentary.

"Every Road I'm On" was included on Cas Haley's album, All the Right People, released in early 2021 on Jimmy Buffet's label, Mailboat Records.

== Personal life ==
Haley was born in Paris, Texas on December 27, 1980, and is currently married to his wife, Cassy. The couple have two children - a son, Eben, and a daughter, Nolah. In 2018, Cas's wife, Cassy, was diagnosed with an aggressive form of breast cancer. Subsequently, Haley cancelled his tour dates and set up a GoFundMe campaign to help cover the family's medical expenses.

== Discography ==
=== Albums ===
Year	Album	Peak			Certifications (sales threshold)
Year	Album	US	US Reggae	Year end Reggae	Certifications (sales threshold)
2008	Cas Haley: Released: February 14, 2008; Label: Cartel Records (All Rights Reserved); Format: CD, digital download	—	2	8	US sales: 40,000
2010	Connection: Released: September 14, 2010; Label: Easy Star Records; Format: CD, digital download	—	2	—	
2013	La Si Dah: Release: May 28, 2013; Label: Easy Star Records; Format: CD, digital download	—	—	—	
2015	More Music More Family: Release: November 6, 2015; Label: Mailboat Records; Format: CD, digital download	—	—	—	
2019	Lessons and Blessings: Release: June 21, 2019; Label: Mailboat Records; Format: CD, digital download	—	—	—	
2021	All the Right People: Release: 2021 TBD; Label: Mailboat Records; Format: CD, digital download	—	—	—	
"—" denotes the album did not chart.

=== Singles ===
Year	Single	Peak	Album
Year	Single	US	Album
2010	"Better"	—	Connection
2020	"Every Road I'm On"	—	All the Right People
2020	"All the Right People"	—	All the Right People
2020	"Blue Jeans"	—	All the Right People
"—" denotes the single did not chart.
