= The Holdup =

American reggae, hip-hop/pop band

- Origin: San Jose, CA
- Genres: Reggae, hip hop, pop
- Years active: 2006–2020, 2024–present
- Labels: Dub Rock Records
- Past members: Mike Garmany (vocalist); Tyler Scurti (guitarist); Danny Flores (drummer); Kyle Christensen (bassist); Clev Stiles (DJ/band manager); Nick Santana (keyboardist); Grant Averill (guitarist); Justin Kastner (bassist)
- Website: www.theholdupmusic.com

The Holdup is an American band from San Jose, California. Their music incorporates elements of reggae, hip-hop, pop, and indie.

== History ==
=== Formation (2006–2007) ===
The Holdup formed initially when drummer Danny Flores and guitarist Tyler Scurti added vocalist Mike Garmany in the autumn of 2006. A second lineup was formed by Danny Flores (drums), Tyler Scurti (guitar), and Mike Garmany (lead vocals/guitar) in 2007 after recruiting Kyle Christensen (bass guitar).

When the band began performing their original songs at local venues around San Jose, a fan base developed for their multi-genre music. As demand for an album began to increase the band recruited Clev Stiles as DJ and band manager.

=== Stay Gold (2008) ===
Their first EP quickly sold one thousand copies in the summer of 2008. A few weeks later the band signed with local independent record label, Dub Rock, and began production on their first album, Stay Gold. Once released, Stay Gold debuted at the #1 spot on the iTunes Reggae Charts. Due to the album's success on iTunes, it was featured on the “What’s Hot” list for six weeks.

=== Confidence (2010) ===
After a successful first album, The Holdup went back into the studio to create their sophomore record, Confidence in 2010. The song “Faster” adds a hip-hop style by incorporating an up-tempo beat and quick delivery by vocalist Garmany. “Motion” is an acoustic sound with heartfelt lyrics, providing musical diversity to the album. Confidence debuted at #1 on the iTunes Reggae Charts and earned the band the award of iTunes "Best New Reggae Artist of 2010".

=== Still Gold (2011) ===
The Holdup produced a third album in 2011, Still Gold. Prior to its release, a half cover of "Young Folks" by Peter Bjorn and John, renamed by The Holdup as "Young Fools", entered the music mainstream. While the third album was in post-production, iTunes recognized the band's talent once more by placing their song "Summertime Baby", off of the album Confidence, on the iTunes Essentials "Rising Stars: Reggae" playlist that was released on March 28, 2011.

Still Gold was launched on April 26, 2011, and debuted at #1 on the iTunes Reggae Charts. It also earned the #2 spot on the Billboard Charts for Reggae Albums.

=== Consequence (2012) ===
The band released their fourth album on May 18, 2012, Consequence.

A single, "Real With You" was released November 7, 2012, for free on the Dub Rock Records website.

=== Fool's Gold, Pt. 1 (2013) ===
On October 15, 2013, they released their first single from their fifth album, Fools Gold, Pt. 1, called "IHTST" (an abbreviation of "I Hate The Summer Time"), available on iTunes. Fools Gold Pt. 1, was released on December 6, 2013.

In promotion for their upcoming album, The Holdup released two singles, "Let's Get High" and a demo version of "Have a Good Summer" on SoundCloud. They then officially released both songs, with a finished version of "Have a Good Summer" on iTunes.

=== H.A.G.S. (2014) ===
On May 12, 2014, The Holdup officially announced via their Facebook page that their newest album was to be called H.A.G.S. (an acronym for "Have a good summer"), and on August 4, it was revealed to be an EP. H.A.G.S. - EP was released on August 26, 2014.

The Holdup has released three new singles since then. "Girls Love Toast" was released for free with the option of donating on their own website on November 10, 2014, later being released on iTunes with an acoustic and remixed version on January 9, 2015. "Wish I" was released on February 10, 2015, on iTunes. Later, "Smell These Roses" was released to iTunes as well on June 9, 2015.

On June 12, 2015, bassist Kyle Christensen announced via his Facebook that he was no longer a part of the band.

Following the departure of Christensen, he was quickly replaced by a temporary bass player on their "It's All Good Tour" in the fall of 2015, touring with the Wheeland Brothers.

=== Leaves In The Pool (2016) ===
The Holdup released their sixth studio album, Leaves In The Pool on December 1, 2016. It featured 16 tracks.

=== Killing Time (2019) ===
In January 2019, the band released their seventh studio album, Killing Time.

=== The Farewell Show (2020) ===
In 2020, The Holdup released an acoustic greatest hits and a live album titled, The Farewell Show. This was the band's final album together, as the members broke up the same year.

DJ/band manager, Clev Stiles created a new band of his own called, Kruel Summer, which, in his words, "picks up where the old Holdup sound used to be before the split."

== Final Lineup ==
=== Members ===
- Mike Garmany – lead vocals (2006–2020)
- Tyler Scurti – guitar (2006–2020)
- Danny Flores – drummer (2006–2020)
- Clev Stiles – DJ/band manager (2007–2020)
- Kyle Christensen – bass (2007–2015)
- Justin Kastner – bass (2015–2020)
- Nick Santana – keyboard
- Grant Averill – guitar

== Discography ==
=== Studio albums ===
Chart History
Year	Album	Label	Billboard peak
2009	Stay Gold	Dub Rock Records	—
2010	Confidence	Dub Rock Records	—
2011	Still Gold	Dub Rock Records	#2
2012	Consequence	Dub Rock Records	—
2013	Fool's Gold, Pt. 1	Dub Rock Records	—
2016	Leaves In The Pool	Dub Rock Records	—
2019	Killing Time	Dub Rock Records	—
2020	The Acoustic Album	Dub Rock Records	—
2020	The Farewell Show (Live)	Dub Rock Records	—
