= Ooklah The Moc =

Roots reggae band

- Origin: Palolo, Hawaii
- Genre: Roots reggae
- Years active: 1994–present
- Labels: Ghetto Circus Records, Father Psalms Studios
- Members: Ryan "Jah Gumby" Murakami; John Davis; Asher Philippart; James LaPierre; Micky Huihui; Kali Navales; Brad Watanabe; Gary Nakano; Mike Cueva; A Bush
- Website: https://www.facebook.com/share/19bjsq6aNW/

Ooklah The Moc is a band originating from Palolo, Oahu, Hawaii, formed in 1997. Ooklah plays strictly roots dub reggae. They currently tour with an o.g. 9-person lineup.

== Name origin ==
The band is named for a character from the animated series Thundarr the Barbarian, the large and powerful leonine humanoid creature Ookla the Mok.

== Band members ==
- Ryan "Jah Gumby" Murakami (Bass)
- John Davis (Drums)
- Asher "Killer P" Philippart (Guitar)
- James "Ras Bird" LaPierre (Vocals)
- Nicholas "Kali" Navales (Vocals)
- Curtis "Mr 83" Helm (Vocals)
- Gary "garotte" Nakano (Trumpet, Flugelhorn)
- Tony Bush (Trombone)
- Robert Daguio (Keys)
- Mike Cueva (Tenor Sax)
- Bernard Soriano (Trumpet)
- "Sista Micky" Huihui (Vocals)

== Discography ==
Year	Album	Songs
January 14, 2001	Ites Massive	1. Blessed 2. Creator 3. Sound Creation 4. Haunted House 5. Live Love 6. Fafa Island 7. No More Tears 8. Herbal Meditation 9. Spliff Mood 10. Dance Ram 11. Melvin's Surprise 12. Humble Vibes!
2004	Rearrange Your Positive	1. Hawaiian Man 2. Jah Will Be There 3. Lovers Rock 4. A.T. Attack 5. The Box 6. In This Time 7. Concrete Vibes 8. You Light 9. Hellfire 10. Hot Hawaiian Nights 11. My Plea 12. The Longest Road
February, 2006	Koko Meets Ooklah The Moc: Struggling Soldier	1. One Big Family 2. My Woman 3. Ghettoman Tribulation 4. Kali Man 5. Style 6. Rude Boy 7. Love Mi Island So 8. Struggling Soldier 9. Version The Family 10. Woman Woman 11. New Style (Freestyle Version) 12. Guiding Star
November 18, 2008	Vaults	1. Thin Line 2. World Party 3. Revolutionary 4. Creation Man 5. Vibes 6. Only If You Want Me to 7. Tree 8. Ital (Featuring koko) 9. Sweet Spot 10. Scene Gal 11. Runaway Love
August 22, 2017	Every Posse	1. Truth & Right 2. Love Is Meant To Be Nice 3. Summer Sun 4. Reggae Journey 5. King 6. Rocket Crucial 7. Too Much Black Gold

== Influences ==
- Rastafari
- Aswad
- Roots Radics (Early 1980s)
- Black Slate
- Lincoln Thompson
- Wu-Tang Clan (mid-1990s)
- Steel Pulse
- Coltrane
- Black Uhuru
- Sly & Robbie
- The Abyssinians
- Junior Reid
