= Prophet Benjamin =

Trinidad and Tobago musician

Prophet Benjamin (born Devon Samuel, c. 1978) is a reggae singer. He was born in the rural village of Newlands in Point Fortin, Trinidad, West Indies.

"Pretty Boy", his debut recording, was number one in Trinidad's Genesis Countdown for 5 weeks.

He has also released songs entitled "Field of weed", "Delilah", "Pension Plan", "Coming from Moruga", "the Usual Suspect" and "Talk Nah".

He is currently one of the leading names in the expanding reggae industry in Trinidad and Tobago

He also is pursuing the soca/chutney industry with famous songs such as: "Throw Wine" (2012), "Lokani" (2013) and "Another One" (2013)

He made it to the Chutney Soca Finals with his famous song "Lokani" (2013) and placed 9th with 22.2 points (out of 45).
