= Nattali Rize =

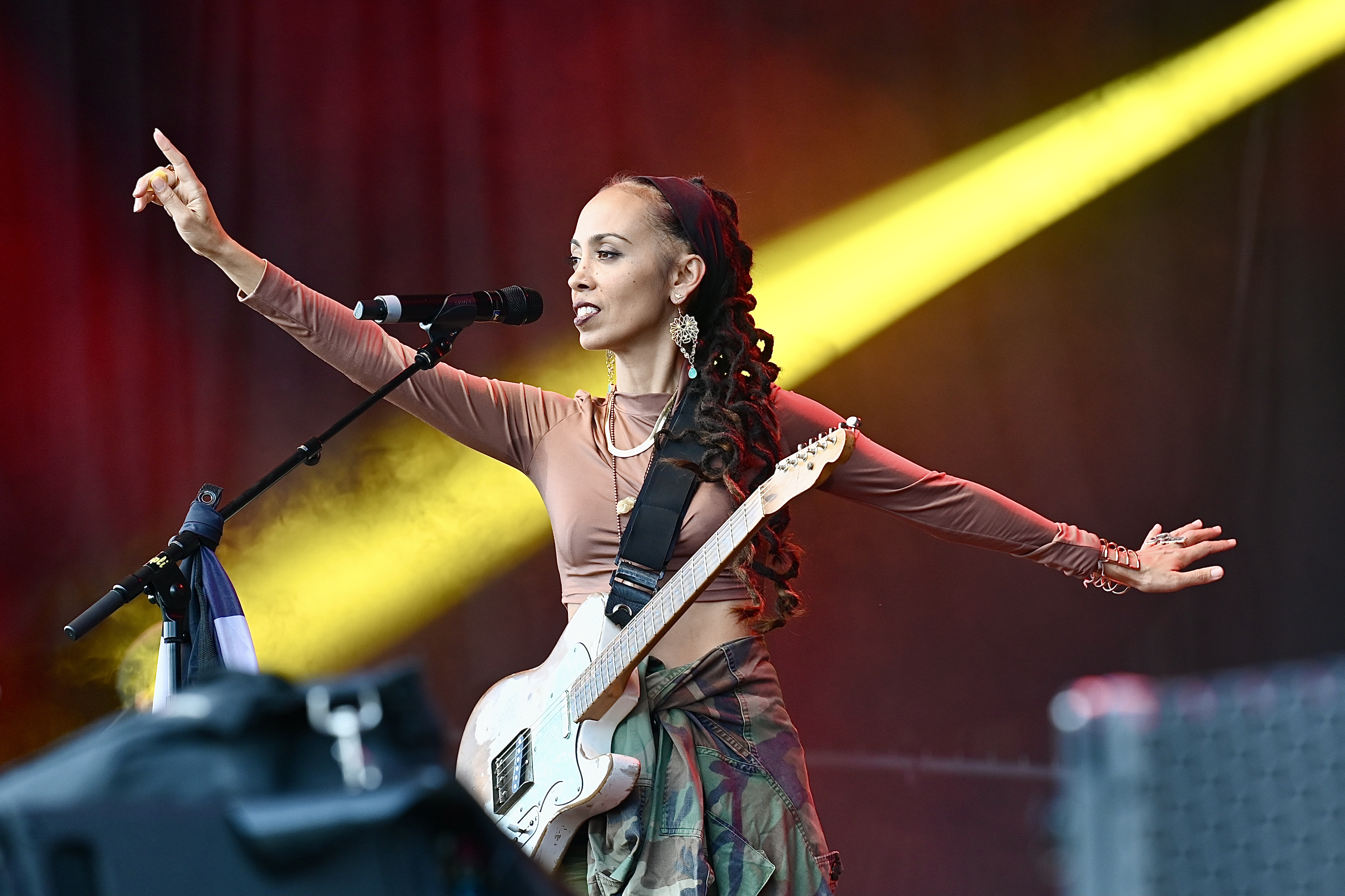
- Nattali Rize at Reggae Geel, Belgium, 2023

Background information
- Also known as: Natalie Pa'apa'a
- Born: Natalie Magdalena Chilcote; Byron Bay, New South Wales, Australia
- Genres: Roots
- Occupations: Musician; producer; social activist
- Instruments: Vocals; guitar; percussion
- Years active: 2000–present
- Website: nattalirize.com

Nattali Rize (born Natalie Magdalena Chilcote) is an Australia-born, Jamaica-based musician, record producer and social activist. In 2003, as Natalie Pa'apa'a, on lead vocals and lead guitar, she was joined by her domestic partner, Carlo Santone, on bass guitar and percussion, to form Blue King Brown, an urban roots ensemble, in Byron Bay.

She issued a single, "Rebel Love", in collaboration with local group, Notis; it was co-written by Rize, Wayne Thompson, Patterson, Sellton and Wels. They toured the US in support of Michael Franti. The collaborators followed with a nine-track EP, New Era Frequency (7 August 2015). Her first album, Rebel Frequency, was released in March 2017.

She also performed in several playing for change songs.
