= Marlon Asher =

Trinidad and Tobago musician

Marlon Sobers
- Also known as: Farmer, Cowboy, Asher
- Origin: Enterprise, Chaguanas, Trinidad and Tobago
- Genres: Reggae
- Occupations: Singer, Ganja Farmer
- Years active: 2006–present

Marlon Asher is a Trinidadian reggae singer from Enterprise, Chaguanas, Trinidad and Tobago. His first hit was "Ganja Farmer", and he later went on to release more reggae songs, one being "Fit and Strong."

Marlon Asher grew up in Enterprise Street, Chaguanas, Trinidad and Tobago. He was a member of the Mount Ararat Spiritual Baptist Church Choir and later converted to Rastafari.

Asher was a pioneer of the Trinidadian reggae movement and his first song "Ganja Farmer" sparked controversy in his country despite being a runaway hit. In an exclusive interview with the Trinidad and Tobago Express, he answered his critics by explaining what the song meant to him:

"I was never a farmer, but I have friends who are, and seeing what they have to go through when police burn their fields inspired me to create the song. People must understand that planters have mouths to feed and this is how they earn a living to do so. Putting aside the fact that herb is life and everything else about that when you think about the work and money a man puts into his field and then see it being burnt, it's not easy."

"Herb is not for everyone. It has people who will smoke and trip. My music is not about promoting hate and violence, it's about uplifting people. I may not be able to change the world, but I can lead people into thinking differently about life and living with each other. Also, the lyrics in the song that tell about the rocket launcher, do not mean that people should kill police. I am showing the anger that a farmer has inside when he sees his field being burnt. That anger and frustration is real."

Asher was once a joiner and a mason but left the trade due to allergies. His left index finger was lost in a sawing accident. He is currently a member of a pan side led by his father Glenford Sobers.

Asher has toured with artists including Sizzla, Slightly Stoopid, Fortunate Youth, Beenie Man, Israel Vibration, Ras Shiloh, Matisyahu, Capleton, Maxi Priest, Kottonmouth Kings, and, the American R&B Group, Boyz II Men. He has toured the continental United States, Hawaii, Canada, Africa, Amsterdam, Germany, the United Kingdom, and other parts of Europe.

He has since paved the way for other local reggae performers such as Prophet Benjamin, I-sasha, Khari Kill, Jah Bami, Xebulon, King David, Mr. Royal Dainties, etc.

In 2015, he released the full studio album from Vas Productions, “Illusions.” He released “Rebirth” in 2019. He was on the compilations “Life Of A Ghetto Youth,” released in 2017, and “Life Of A Ghetto Youth Chapter 2,” released in 2019. He has collaborated on music with other reggae artists and producers including Sizzla, Anthony B, Slightly Stoopid, Pressure Busspipe, Orlando Octave, Fortunate Youth, Don Corleon, and Teflon Zincfence.

During the worldwide COVID-19 pandemic, Marlon worked on his next album release, “Life Of A Ghetto Youth Chapter 3." In 2020, he released two singles, “Family Love” and “Use Me", and performed a few live streams and drive-in shows with the band Slightly Stoopid. In 2021, he performed his first show to the public in over a year due to COVID-19 in Arcata, California on March 20, 2021.
