= Shrub (band) =

American reggae rock and rap band

- Origin: Columbus, Ohio, United States
- Genres: Reggae fusion, reggae rock, hip hop, reggae, ska, acoustic rock, alternative rock
- Years active: 2010–present
- Labels: RASTATARI Records
- Members: Jay Shrub; Benny Coles; Kevin Oliver; Josh Altfater; Jasen Baskette
- Website: www.shrublove.com

Shrub is an American reggae, rock and rap group from Columbus, Ohio. The band released their debut album, Senorita, a six-song EP in February 2010 and was voted by readers as High Times magazine's Unsigned Band of the Month in September 2010.

== History ==
=== Formation and Señorita EP (2010) ===
Shrub formed in 2010 when founding member software developer Jay "Shrub" Shawberry who was a student at Bowling Green State University, with his love for reggae and hip-hop, started rapping and producing music in his own basement the year before and wanted to go further in the music industry under his "Shrub Project".

The band name is derived from a nickname Shawberry's older brother got in college because their last name sounds like "shrubbery" when you're feeling tipsy, so it's not from marijuana like many fans think.

He put an advertisement on Craigslist looking for musicians and teamed up with fellow Ohio-native Blaine Dillinger, at the time the guitarist for reggae band Clear Conscience and current HIRIE guitarist.

They self-produced and recorded their debut album, Señorita, a six-song EP which released on February 17, 2010. Señorita features the respected artwork of Opie Ortiz from Sublime fame and singer from the Long Beach Dub Allstars.

The album also features a guest appearance by DJ Rasta Root (former DJ for Phife Dawg of A Tribe Called Quest). It also reached #21 on the Amazon Reggae Bestseller charts. And registered three songs in the "Top Alternative Hip Hop" charts on CDBaby.com, with their song "Cherries" reaching the #1 spot.

Shrub was voted by readers as High Times magazine's "Unsigned Band of the Month" in September 2010.

=== Highceratops (2013) ===
After several changes in Shrub's lineup, the duo added Benny Coleman on bass who was in his first-year in jazz studies at Ohio State University. Coleman was a Shrub fan as soon as he saw the band in concert for the first time opening for Rebelution at Newport Music Hall back in February 2011.

On September 23, 2013, Shrub released their first full-length album, Highceratops. The album also features the guitar of Shrub's latest addition to its full-time lineup, Kevin Oliver, a former guitarist for George Clinton and Parliament-Funkadelic.

The album has guest appearances by C-Money of Slightly Stoopid, Canadian mix-master Dubmatix, Kimberly Freeman of One-Eyed Doll and Cleveland-rockers Tropidelic. Highceratops debuted at #5 on the iTunes Reggae Charts. Soon after this album, Shrub started touring heavily throughout the United States, until abruptly stopped in the summer of 2017.

=== Back To Earth (2020) ===
After a three-year hiatus from touring and seven-years since their last album, Shrub was back with their second studio album, the aptly titled Back To Earth which released on May 15, 2020. Jay and Blaine were back together with help from Blaine's HIRIE bandmates: Matt Benoit (drums), Andy Flores (bass), Chris Del Camino (saxophone, tribal flute) and Andrew McKeezy (trombone) on the single "Shrub Love" an homage to all of Shrub's reggae influences.

Also featured on the album is violinist Jaime Shadowlight on the song "Momma Always Told Me" and keyboardist Mike DeGuzman from Passafire on the track "Bright Side of the Moon", as well as songs featuring Beebs and Jenny Flory of Wonder Twin Powers. The album was mixed by Ohio local B.J. Davis and mastered by famous reggae rock producer Danny Kalb (The Movement).

=== Touring ===
The band's largest tours was SXSW in Austin, Texas in March 2013. They performed at the 2014 Reggae In The Hills Festival in Northern California.

Shrub has shared the stage with: The Dirty Heads, Collie Buddz, Rebelution, Yellowman, The Expendables, Kottonmouth Kings, Gov't Mule, Hed PE, Badfish (Sublime tribute band), Scotty Don't, Marlon Asher, Yonder Mountain String Band, Ballyhoo!, ekoostik hookah, Zach Deputy, Don Carlos, Mighty Diamonds, Tribal Seeds, The Young Dubliners, Passafire, Seedless, Micah Brown, The Revivalists, Fortunate Youth, Big B, Spiritual Rez, Tomorrow's Bad Seeds, Echo Movement, Best Coast, Dinosaur Jr, The Dirty Projectors, Grizzly Bear, Tennis, Jul Big Green, etc.

== Musical Influences ==
Shrub's music draws inspiration and has been compared to artists Atmosphere, Cypress Hill, Dirty Heads, G Love and Special Sauce, Kottonmouth Kings, and Sublime. However, Shrub has created a style and sound of their own. With a recipe of reggae, hip hop, rock and even pop, their music will make listeners feel the "Shrub Love" from the moment the first beat drops.

In an interview, Blaine Dillinger, describes Jay Shrub's character:

"Jay said, 'I don't want to be famous, I simply want to change the world.' I will never forget these words. Here was a musician (by night) and a software developer (by day), putting out some of the most intriguing music of anyone in the Columbus, Ohio area. Yet even back then, he shied away from the spotlight. So many people wondered what happened to Shrub? Truth is, a recent three-year hiatus proved to be the ultimate low point. Everyone thought the music was dead but in fact the story had just begun."

== Discography ==
=== Studio albums/EPs ===
Shrub Chart History
Year	Album	Label	Billboard peak
2010	Señorita EP	RASTATARI Records	—
2013	Highceratops	RASTATARI Records	—
2020	Back To Earth	RASTATARI Records	—

=== Singles ===
Title	Release date	Album
"We Wanna Smoke"	2010	Señorita EP
"Come and Get It"	2010	Señorita EP
"Señorita"	2010	Señorita EP
"Cherries"	2010	Señorita EP
"I Did It For Us"	2010	Señorita EP
"My Blood"	2010	Señorita EP
"Fast Lane"	2013	Highceratops
"Herbivore"	2013	Highceratops
"What I Would Do To You"	2013	Highceratops
"Triple Play"	2013	Highceratops
"Coconut Tree"	2013	Highceratops
"Rolling Rock" (feat. Tropidelic)	2013	Highceratops
"Go Run"	2013	Highceratops
"I Just Wanna Love You"	2013	Highceratops
"Supergirl" (feat. One-Eyed Doll & C-Money of Slightly Stoopid)	2013	Highceratops
"Dying Like Some Dinosaur"	2013	Highceratops
"Here We Grow Again"	2013	Highceratops
"Got Away"	2013	Highceratops
"I Dub It For Us (Remix)" (feat. Dubmatix)	2013	Highceratops
"Shrub Love"	2020	Back To Earth
"Help Me Ganja"	2020	Back To Earth
"My Radio"	2020	Back To Earth
"Someday You Won't Look This Good" (feat. Jenny Flory)	2020	Back To Earth
"Momma Always Told Me" (feat. Beebs)	2020	Back To Earth
"Bright Side of the Moon"	2020	Back To Earth
"Down On Me"	2020	Back To Earth

=== Appearances ===
Shrub also appears on the following compilations/albums:

- One Big Family 9 (2011) album on One Big Family Records.

The compilation also features: SOJA, Pacific Dub, Pato Banton, Toko Tasi, Jack Maness, Stick Figure, The Expendables, Jon Wayne and The Pain, Josh Heinrichs, and more.

- "Headphones" song by Tropidelic on their All Heads Unite album (2012), which also features vocals by Jul Big Green.

== Lineup ==
=== Current band members ===
- Jay "Shrub" Shawberry – Lead Vocals (2009–Present)
- Blaine Dillinger – Lead guitar (2010–2013, 2020–Present)

=== Past band members ===
- Benny Coleman – Bass/Vocals (2013–2017)
- Kevin Oliver – Lead Guitar (2013–2017)
- Josh Altfater – Guitar (2013–2017)
- Jasen Baskette – Drums (2013–2017)
- Jason "Lyrical" Woodward – Vocals/Raps (2014)
- Daniel Zwelling – Drums on Highceratops album (2014)
