= Tropidelic =

American reggae rock band

- Origin: Cleveland, Ohio
- Genres: Funk, Rock, Rap Rock, Reggae
- Years active: 2008–present
- Label: Ineffable Records
- Members: Matthew Roads; James Begin; Bobby Chronic; David Pags; Rob Schafer; Rex Larkman
- Past members: Darrick Willis Derek McBryde
- Website: http://www.tropidelic.com

Tropidelic is an American band from Cleveland, Ohio. They infuse multiple genres into a style that's a blend of reggae rock, hip-hop and high energy funk.

== History ==
=== Formation (2005–2006) ===
Tropidelic was formed by founding members Matthew Roads (originally from Pittsburgh) and Kyle "Chevontez" Cheuvront while jamming together in the dorms at Kent State University, located in Kent, Ohio, in 2005. After collaborating with rapper Skillzz (Erick Steckel), the two recruited him as their hype man, as well as adding guitarist Andrew Mastrian to the band. In 2006, they found bassist Neal Badolato and drummer Rob Paternite on MySpace.

With the band now complete, Tropidelic self-produced their first raw album, Funk Love the same year.

=== Self-produced EPs and lineup changes (2007–2011) ===
Tropidelic built up a following after they self-distributed over 10,000 free copies of their first self-produced EP, Rebirth of the Dope and relocated to Cleveland.

After the original ensemble (including co-founding member Kyle Cheuvront) went on with their own lifestyles, Roads reformed the band with like-minded professional musicians which included, Chris Dunne on guitar, Corey Harper on bass, Jasen Bakette on drums and DJ Mekadog on the turntables. The band was finding their sound with all different musical styles. Roads describes himself as a "hip-hop guy", guitarist Dunne is mainly an "old-school punk kind of guy", and drummer Bakette is more into alternative rock, so they all make it work into this "reggae-rock style". Bassist Corey Harper, the most recent addition, has only been with the band since May 2010. And "scratcher" DJ Mekadog uses all original records to create his sound; around 7,000 vinyl records in his basement.

With the new members, the band's self-produced second release, and first studio recording, Tree City Exodus was released in 2008. It was titled after the city of Kent's nickname. They followed it up with another EP, Erie Vibes & Irie Tides in winter 2010. Later that year, the band released a six-song EP titled, Working Class Phoenix that Roads described as "symbolic of the rise of our country's lost and disregarded generation."

=== All Heads Unite (2012) ===
Over the years, the band has evolved through several member changes (the original and last lineup moved or got married) and Roads added Bobby "Chronic" Markouc as the lead guitarist, David "Pags" Paglisotti on bass, and Derek Willis on drums. The addition of a horn section, Derek McBryde on trumpet, and James Begin on trombone, as well as vocals/raps, who were both super fans of Tropidelic, led up to their first full-length major-released album, All Heads Unite, being released on November 15, 2012. Special guests featured on the album were Echo Movement, Jul Big Green, Shrub and Alex Fagan.

=== Police State (2015) ===
Since the release of All Heads Unite, Tropidelic has released six additional albums and EPs. Their follow-up self-produced album Police State, which released on March 21, 2015. It included their first big single "Alcoholic" featuring Brandon Hardesty of Bumpin Uglies and their second single "If I Die Tomorrow" with Zach Fowler of Sun-Dried Vibes.

=== Go Down With The Ship (2016) ===
Tropidelic released their third independent album, Go Down With The Ship on April 2, 2016 and featured the songs "Bad Cookie" and "Too Loose".

Later that year on December 2, The Hard North EP was released. It featured two new tracks plus remixes of their previous songs.

=== Heavy Is The Head (2017) ===
Their fourth album, Heavy is the Head, was released on November 10, 2017 on Pepper's LAW Records and reached #3 on the Billboard charts on December 2, 2017. The band won Reggae 360's inaugural contest for Album of the Year in 2017 with their Heavy Is The Head album.

=== Here In The Heights (2019) ===
Tropidelic's fifth album, Here in the Heights was released on June 7, 2019 through Ineffable Music Group. This full-length album features other notable artists such as Angelo Moore of Fishbone, Howi Spangler of Ballyhoo!, and Zach Deputy, among others. Here in the Heights peaked at #2 on the Billboard reggae charts on June 22, 2019.

The band also finished out 2019 by releasing a five-track EP, Flyover Renaissance, with Ineffable Music Group on December 13, 2019.

=== Of Illusion (2020) ===
Tropidelic's sixth studio album, titled Of Illusion was released on November 13, 2020. It features artists Bumpin Uglies, Devin the Dude, Dirty Heads, The Elovaters, Matisyahu, and Shwayze. Of Illusion was Reggae 360's "2020 Album of the Year" winner. The album went up against top contender, Arise Roots' Pathways album in a tournament-style bracket in the final round.

Tropidelic was featured as one of many reggae bands on Collie Buddz riddim album, Cali Roots Riddim 2021 with their single, "Pivot Foot", which was produced by Buddz and mixed by Stick Figure's touring guitarist, producer Johnny Cosmic.

In 2021, Tropidelic was one of several reggae and punk bands on The House That Bradley Built, a charity compilation honoring Sublime's lead singer Bradley Nowell, helping musicians with substance abuse. They covered Sublime's song "Smoke Two Joints" on the Deluxe Edition.

On September 22, 2021, Tropidelic was voted by their hometown, the Winners of Best of Cleveland 2021 for "Best Band".

=== All The Colors (2022) ===
Tropidelic recorded their seventh full-length studio album, titled All The Colors which was released on August 5, 2022. It features special musical guests Brother Ali, Geoff Weers of The Expendables, Nick Hexum of 311, Krayzie Bone, Little Stranger, Prof, and Surfer Girl.

This is the last album with the band's long-time trumpet player Derek McBryde who announced on Facebook on June 29 that he is moving to Florida with his wife to "help build an alcohol & drug rehabilitation center and run transitional housing". His last local show was at the band's own festival, Everwild. He finished up touring with 311 in September. Shortly after, West Virginia native Robert Schafer joined the band, playing trumpet and keyboard.

All The Colors was "considered" for a Grammy Award nomination for "Best Pop Vocal Album" at the 65th Grammy Awards in 2023.

As seen on their social media pages, Tropidelic threw out the ceremonial first pitch and performed live before the fireworks started at the Cleveland Guardians game at Progressive Field on May 26, 2023.

=== Royal Grove ===
Tropidelic released their eighth full-length studio album titled Royal Grove on July 19, 2024 on Ineffable Records. For this album, the band blends reggae, rock, and pop.

While the uptempo songs emphasize positivity, as Roads describes,

"I'm a firm believer in the idea that we make ourselves happy, although it's not always easy to do. As far as my input on Royal Grove went, I wanted everything on this record to have positive energy."

The album's lead single, "Floating", features the silky smooth voices of Micah Pueschel and Jackson Wetherbee of reggae rock bands Iration and The Elovaters. The band also collaborated with The Pharcyde, The Palmer Squares, Rittz, and Tobyraps.

== Musical influences ==
Through the years, Tropidelic formed their sound by fusing together reggae rock, hip-hop, funk and some punk rock. The band's influences range from music artists and bands such as, Sublime, 311, Pepper, Red Hot Chili Peppers, Bad Brains, Mike Patton, Alborosie, Tom Morello, Parliament, Funkadelic, Slightly Stoopid, Outkast, Atmosphere, Pantera, Incubus and Unified Culture.

== Tours ==
Tropidelic has been featured at Electric Forest Festival, California Roots Music & Art Festival, 311 Caribbean Cruise VI, and Warped Tour. Since 2017, Tropidelic has also hosted their own annual grassroots music festival, The Freakstomp Music Festival.

== Official festivals ==
=== The Freakstomp Music Festival ===
Tropidelic started hosting a music festival in 2017. The Freakstomp Music Festival is named after their song "Freakstomp" off of their 2015 album Police State and is hosted in annually in August. After hosting the first two events in Medina, Ohio, the event has most recently moved to Clear Fork Adventure Park in Butler, Ohio. The weekend event hosts national and local acts, including artists such as Too Many Zooz, Bumpin Uglies, Mike Pinto, and Afroman.

During the COVID-19 pandemic, the festival was canceled in 2020 and was eventually transformed into the Everwild Festival. It was decided by Tropidelic to embark on a "fresh musical journey" with their fans after stepping into a "New World" after COVID-19.

=== Everwild Festival ===
2021: In the summer of 2021, Tropidelic debuted their second official music festival, called "Everwild", a two-night music festival, presented by JSGLive. Held on August 13 and 14, Everwild is a weekend of "music and memories" featuring two nights of Tropidelic at Brushy Fork Phamily Ranch in Newark, Ohio. The lineup includes: Ballyhoo!, Passafire, Kash'd Out, The Palmer Squares, The Ries Brothers, Sun-Dried Vibes, Bikini Trill, and Zoo Trippin', as well as local bands.

2022: Reggae rock music festival EVERWILD returned for its second year on August 12 and 13. The fest was hosted at the gorgeous Legend Valley in Thornville, Ohio, to accommodate its rapid growth. The Dirty Heads, Tropidelic, and HIRIE were headliners. Friday’s artists included Tropidelic and HIRIE headlining with support from Little Stranger, Joe Samba, The Quasi Kings, The Palmer Squares, Toby & Friends, and Rockstead. Saturday featured Dirty Heads and Tropidelic headlining and Bumpin Uglies, 99 Neighbors, Artikal Sound System, Mike Pinto, Cassidy King, Mooky, Derek McBryde, Slim Boogie, and Blind Joe Wallace. 2-day passes were $149 and fees, while Saturday single-day tickets were $89 and fees. Camping was $20 for walk-in and $50 for car camping. VIP includes early entry on Thursday, VIP car camping, t-shirt, poster, exclusive bathrooms, and an autograph session with Tropidelic. This was an all-ages event with children under 12 being admitted free with a ticketed adult.

2023: Previously a two-day event, the third edition of EVERWILD Music Festival was held at Legend Valley in Thornville, OH, on August 3–5. Headliners for 2023 included Tropidelic, Pepper, Bone Thugs-N-Harmony, Prof, and Iya Terra, with support from Bumpin Uglies, Little Stranger, Mike Pinto, Kyle Smith, Surfer Girl, and more.Tickets went on sale Wednesday, February 15. Limited camping and VIP upgrades will be available. EVERWILD was an all-ages event with children 12 and under getting in free with a ticketed adult.

2024: Tropidelic's official music festival is the coming together of like-minded concertgoers at Legend Valley in Thornville, Ohio for a weekend of camping and fun. Performers taking the stage August 1–4, 2024 include Rebelution, Stick Figure, The Movement, Tropidelic, Apostle Jones, Ballyhoo!, Benny & Zach, Brandon Hardesty, Bumpin Uglies, Cultivated Mind, Dale and the ZDubs, Devin the Dude, James Begin, Jarv, Kyle Smith, Little Stranger, Rubix Groove, Sensamotion, SOJA, TDK, The Hip Abduction, The Palmer Squares, The Quasi Kings, Tobyraps, and Wookiefoot. ===

== Other projects ==
In December 2019, Tropidelic partnered with Platform Brewing Co. in Cleveland, Ohio to create a winter-inspired cream ale, a 16-ounce can called "Snow Country" after their popular single. It's brewed with flaked corn and a touch of cinnamon, with 4.7% ABV.

Tropidelic collaborated with Engine Athletics. First in 2020 with a basketball jersey paying homage to two classic Cleveland Cavaliers uniforms. Then with a baseball jersey in 2021 with two color styles to choose from, representing their hometown Cleveland Indians.

== Lineup ==
Current members:

- Matthew Roads – Lead Vocals/Guitar (2005–present)
- James Begin – Vocals/Trombone (2012–present)
- Bobby "Chronic" Markouc – Lead Guitar (2012–present)
- David "Pags" Paglisotti – Bass (2012–present)
- Rex Larkman – Drums (2017–present)
- Robert Schafer – Trumpet/Keyboard (2022–present)

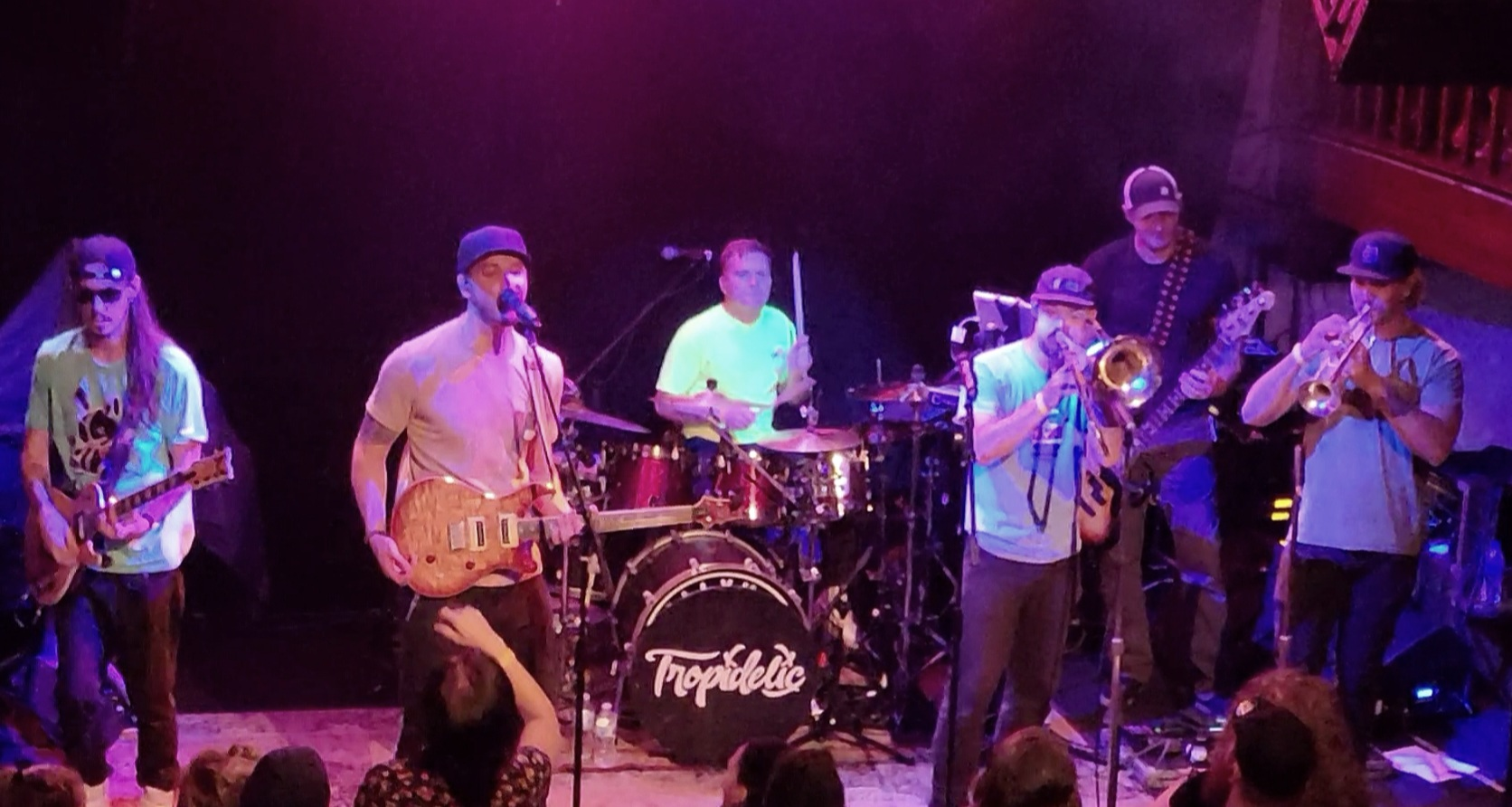
Tropidelic performing at Bird & Betty's in Beach Haven, NJ on June 12, 2021

Former members:

- Kyle "Chevontez" Cheuvront – Guitar (2005–2008)
- Andrew Mastrian – Guitar (2005-2006)
- Erick "Skillzz" Steckel – Rapper (2005–2006)
- Neal Badolato – Bass (2006–2007)
- Rob Paternite – Drums (2006–2007)
- Chris Dunne – Guitar (2007–2011)
- Corey Harper – Bass (2007–2011)
- Jasen Bakette – Drums (2007–2011)
- DJ Mekadog – Turntables (2007–2011)
- Darrick Willis – Drums (2012–2017)
- Tim Younessi – Saxophone (2016)
- Frank Toncar – Keyboard, Saxophone and Percussion (2017)
- Derek McBryde – Trumpet (2012–2022)

== Discography ==
=== Studio albums ===
Tropidelic Chart History
| Year | Album | Label | Billboard peak |
|---|---|---|---|
| 2012 | All Heads Unite | Tropidelic | — |
| 2015 | Police State | Tropidelic | — |
| 2016 | Go Down With the Ship | Tropidelic | — |
| 2017 | Heavy is the Head | LAW Records | #3 |
| 2019 | Here in the Heights | Ineffable Records | #2 |
| 2020 | Of Illusion | Ineffable Records | TBD |
| 2022 | All The Colors | Ineffable Records | TBD |
| 2024 | Royal Grove | Ineffable Records | TBD |

=== EPs/remixes/live albums ===
| Year | Album | Label |
|---|---|---|
| 2008 | Tree City Exodus (EP) | None |
| 2010 | Erie Vibes & Irie Tides (EP) | PeacefulRiot Recordings |
| 2016 | The Hard North (Remixes) | Tropidelic |
| 2019 | Flyover Renaissance (EP) | Ineffable Records |
| 2020 | Live at Sugarshack Sessions | Sugarshack Records |

=== Singles ===
| Title | Release date | Album |
|---|---|---|
| "Gritz" | November 13, 2012 | All Heads Unite |
| "Only Rider" (feat. Echo Movement) | November 13, 2012 | All Heads Unite |
| "Headphones" (feat. Shrub & Jul Big Green) | November 13, 2012 | All Heads Unite |
| "Ain't No Game" | November 13, 2012 | All Heads Unite |
| "Alcoholic" (feat. Bumpin Uglies) | March 21, 2015 | Police State |
| "Freakstomp" | March 21, 2015 | Police State |
| "If I Die Tomorrow" (feat. Sun-Dried Vibes) | March 21, 2015 | Police State |
| "Ideal" | March 21, 2015 | Police State |
| "Police State" | March 21, 2015 | Police State |
| "Look Forward" | March 21, 2015 | Police State |
| "Bad Cookie" | April 2, 2016 | Go Down With the Ship |
| "Too Loose" | April 2, 2016 | Go Down With the Ship |
| "Volume" | April 2, 2016 | Go Down With The Ship |
| "The Line" | April 2, 2016 | Go Down With The Ship |
| "Atonement" | December 2, 2016 | The Hard North EP |
| "Volume" (Savage Royale Remix) | December 2, 2016 | The Hard North EP |
| "Dollar Saved" | November 10, 2017 | Heavy is the Head |
| "Hey Now" | November 10, 2017 | Heavy is the Head |
| "Leviathan" | November 10, 2017 | Heavy is the Head |
| "High and Lows" | November 10, 2017 | Heavy is the Head |
| "Offer It Up" | November 10, 2017 | Heavy is the Head |
| "Bad One" | June 7, 2019 | Here in the Heights |
| "Cali" | June 7, 2019 | Here in the Heights |
| "Good Times" (feat. Fishbone) | June 7, 2019 | Here in the Heights |
| "Impossible" | June 7, 2019 | Here in the Heights |
| "Snow Country" | June 7, 2019 | Here in the Heights |
| "The Works" (feat. Ballyhoo!) | June 7, 2019 | Here in the Heights |
| "Money & Time" | December 13, 2019 | Flyover Renaissance EP |
| "Open Book" (feat. Flobots) | December 13, 2019 | Flyover Renaissance EP |
| "Pressure" (feat. The Palmer Squares) | December 13, 2019 | Flyover Renaissance EP |
| "Snowman" (feat. Dirty Heads) | April 24, 2020 | Of Illusion |
| "New World" (feat. Matisyahu, Bumpin Uglies & The Elovaters) | June 28, 2020 | Of Illusion |
| "Feels Like Home" (feat. Shwayze) | September 18, 2020 | Of Illusion |
| "Sunny Days" (feat. Devin the Dude) | October 23, 2020 | Of Illusion |
| "Busted Kids" | November 13, 2020 | Of Illusion |
| "Criminal" | November 13, 2020 | Of Illusion |
| "Sleepers" | November 13, 2020 | Of Illusion |
| "IDWD" (feat. The Quasi Kings) | November 13, 2020 | Of Illusion |
| "Rolling Stone" | November 13, 2020 | Of Illusion |
| "Smoke Two Joints" (The Toyes cover) | January 15, 2021 | The House That Bradley Built (Single) |
| "Busted Kids" (Nikoshouse Remix) (feat. Howie Spangler of Ballyhoo!) | March 5, 2021 | (Single) |
| "Pivot Foot" | May 28, 2021 | Cali Roots Riddim 2021 (Single) |
| "Neighborhood" (feat. Krayzie Bone & Prof) | September 17, 2021 | (Single) |
| "Falling Down" (feat. Nick Hexum of 311) | April 8, 2022 | (Single) |
| "People Talk" (feat. Brother Ali) | June 3, 2022 | (Single) |
| "For You" (feat. Geoff Weers of The Expendables) | July 8, 2022 | Royal Grove (Single) |
| "Ease Up" | February 2, 2024 | Royal Grove (Single) |
| "Same Hat" (feat. Ritzz) | February 8, 2024 | Royal Grove (Single) |
| "Floating" (feat. Iration & The Elovaters) | May 17, 2024 | Royal Grove (Single) |
| "Movie Star" (feat. The Pharcyde) | June 21, 2024 | Royal Grove (Single) |
