= Big Green =

Big Green may refer to:

- The nickname for Dartmouth College
  - Athletic teams are known as the Dartmouth Big Green
- The Big Green, a 1995 Disney film
- Big Green (Dragon Ball), a nickname for Piccolo
- Big Green (non-profit company), a US-based business
- Big Green Island, part of the Big Green Group of islands northeast of Tasmania, Australia
- Jul Big Green (born 1990), American musician and producer
- Lake Big Green, Green Lake County, Wisconsin
- Hokkaido Big Green, a nickname for Hokkaido University, Sapporo, Japan
- Big Green, a numbers game run by the Oneida Nation of Wisconsin
- A nickname for Charlie Green (c. 1895–1935), American jazz trombonist
