= The Elovaters =

American reggae rock band

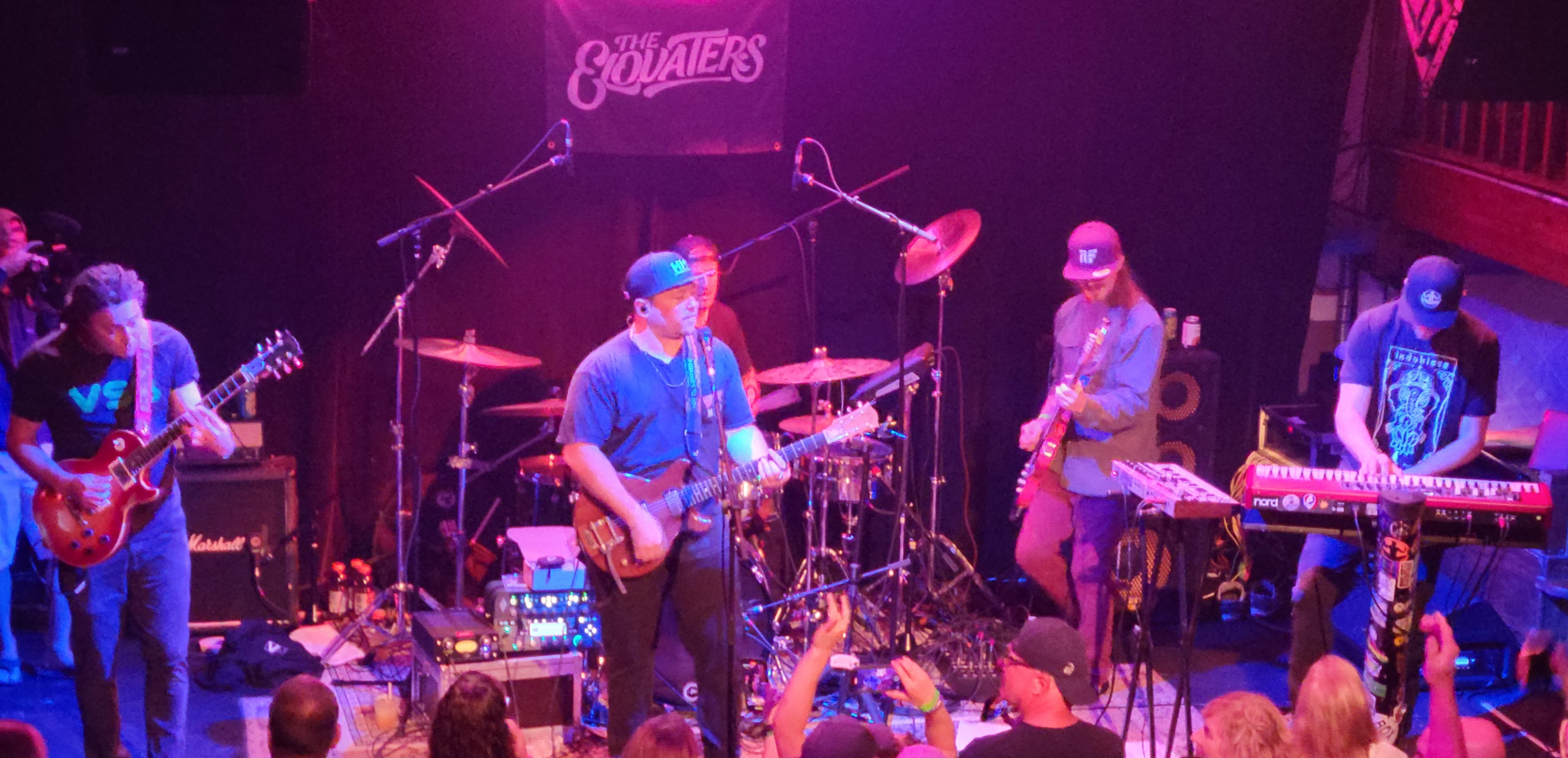
- The Elovaters performing in June 2021

Background information
- Origin: Boston, Massachusetts, US
- Genres: Reggae rock; dub; surf rock
- Years active: 2014–present
- Labels: Rootfire Cooperative; Ineffable Music Group
- Members: Jackson Wetherbee; John Alves; Nick Asta; Matt Link; Derrick Cabral; Greg Nectow
- Past members: Mark King; Nick Frenay; Myles Sweeney
- Website: www.theelovaters.com

The Elovaters are an American reggae rock band from Boston that formed in 2014.

== History ==
=== Formation and The Cornerstone (2014–2017) ===
Formed in 2014 in their original hometown of Marshfield, Massachusetts, The Elovaters were formally The Cornerstone, a 7-piece reggae rock band rising on the Boston concert scene.

The band later changed their name to The Elovaters, and re-released their debut album now taking their former title The Cornerstone. It was officially released on January 20, 2017 and was recorded, mixed, and mastered by Mike Caplan at the Lion and Fox Studios in Washington, D.C.

=== Defy Gravity (2018–2019) ===
Their sophomore album, Defy Gravity released on October 26, 2018 through Rootfire Cooperative and was produced by Danny Kalb. It debuted #1 on Billboard's Reggae chart and iTunes Reggae chart. It was also voted people's choice "Album of the Year" by Surf Roots TV & Radio.

Rootfire defined their music as "warm weather reggae out of one of the coldest places in the country." The band is currently represented by Madison House Agency.

Their song "Boston" was played during the Boston Red Sox World Series parade. And "People Go" was featured on CBS's Hawaii Five-0. Both songs are from their Defy Gravity album.

=== Double Vision EP (2020) ===
The Elovaters released their Double Vision EP on May 29, 2020; their second collaboration with producer Danny Kalb. The 5-song EP features Brett Bollinger of Pepper, Giant Panda Guerilla Dub Squad, Slightly Stoopid, among others. It was recorded at The Noise Floor in Dover, New Hampshire. The EP introduced their first single "Fast and Slow". In December 2020, Double Vision was also voted "EP of the Year" by online reggae news website, Reggae 360.

=== Live albums and Defy Dub ===
The band released an acoustic live album titled Live @ Sugarshack Sessions on November 16, 2019. And a dub album, Defy Dub on August 28, 2020.

They also released a live stream and digital album Live From The Felton Music Hall on October 25, 2020. It featured an hour and a half live performance of songs from their previous albums and EP at the Felton Music Hall in Felton, California.

The Elovaters was featured as one of many reggae bands on Collie Buddz riddim album, Cali Roots Riddim 2020 with their single, "Sensimilla", which was produced by Collie Buddz and mixed by Stick Figure's touring guitarist, producer Johnny Cosmic.

In January 2021, The Elovaters was one of several reggae and punk bands on The House That Bradley Built, a charity compilation honoring Sublime's lead singer Bradley Nowell, helping musicians with substance abuse. They covered Sublime's song "Get Ready" on the Deluxe Edition.

=== Castles (2021) ===
The Elovaters released their third full-length album, Castles on August 13, 2021 on their own imprint Belly Full Records. It was produced by Johnny Cosmic and recorded at Stick Figure's Great Stone Studios in Oakland, California in only 16 days. Jackson Wetherbee said [it's the] "most eclectic album we've ever done. I've brought in more singer/songwriter stuff. We weren't trying to be overly reggae on this album." Starting in March, they released singles from the upcoming album which features reggae artists The Movement, Brother Ali, G. Love & Special Sauce, Keznamdi, Stick Figure, Luke Mitrani, and St. Maarten reggae group, Orange Grove.

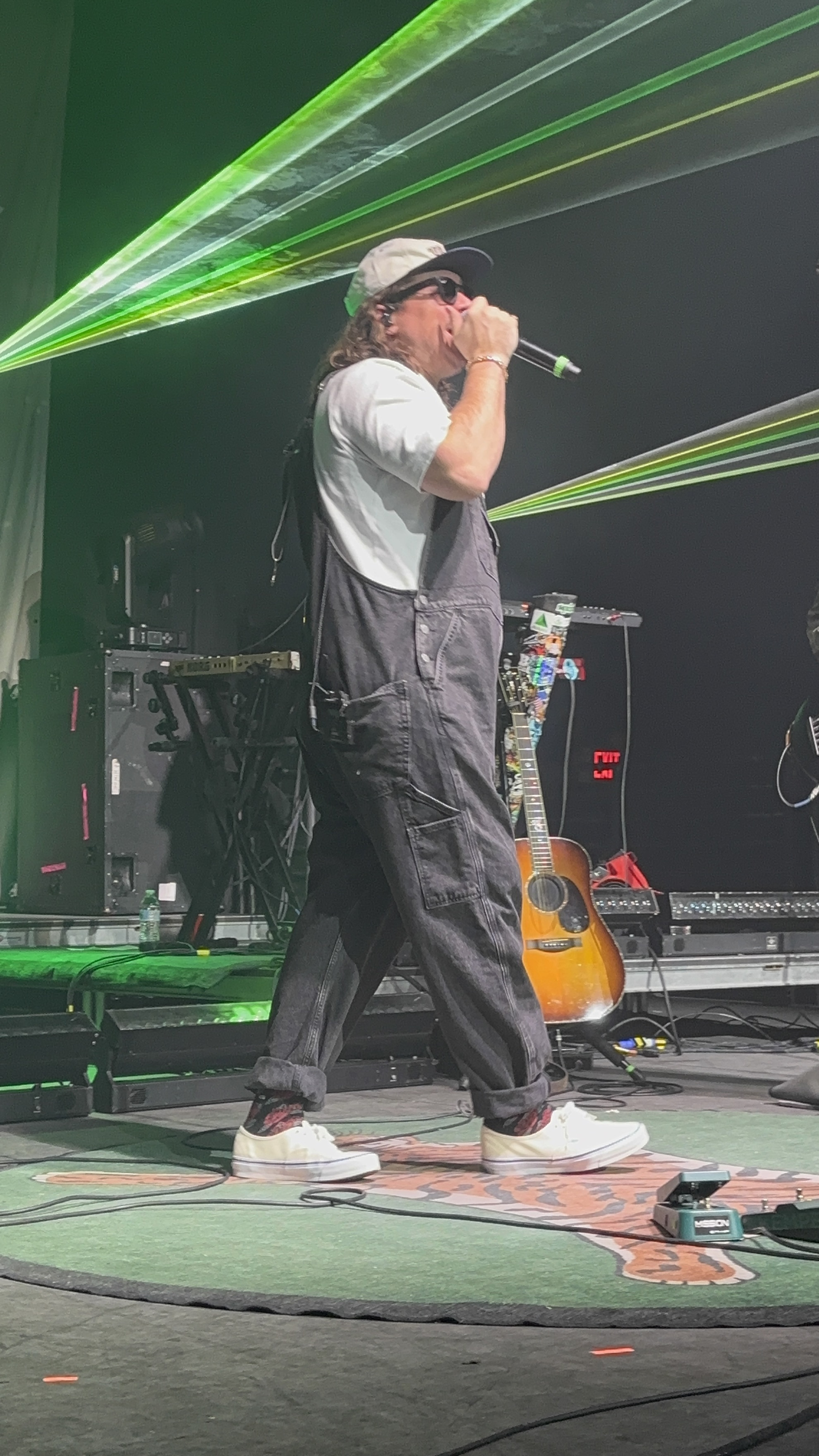
Jackson Wetherbee of The Elovaters performs at Union Transfer in Philadelphia on January 11, 2025.

=== Endless Summer (2023) ===
In June 2023, The Elovaters announced their fourth studio album, Endless Summer, which was released on July 28. Starting in March, they released singles, "All Her Favorite Songs" (feat. Little Stranger), "Sunlight", "M.I.A., and "Come and Get It". The 14-track album was produced by Danny Kalb with additional production and songwriting by Nick Bailey. It was engineered by assistant Marco Ramiez at Sonic Ranch in Tornillo, Texas and mastered by Chris Gehringer at Sterling Sound in Edgewater, New Jersey. The cover features artwork by Laihha Organna, who designed the band's single covers. The album was released on July 28, 2023. The band went on tour with Shwayze and Surfer Girl to promote the album in fall 2023.

On October 18, 2024, a deluxe edition of Endless Summer was released.

=== Shark Belly Motel (2026) ===
The Elovaters released the single "Sky High" in July 2024, featuring Jared Watson of the Dirty Heads, plus several other singles intended for a new album. The album Shark Belly Motel was announced in early 2026 and features 18 tracks. It was released on May 15, 2026. It has been described as an evolution from Endless Summer that includes sharper hooks, polished production, and a broader emotional range.

== Awards and honors ==
In 2018, The Elovaters won the annual Surf Roots TV & Radio fans-choice "Album of the Year" with their Defy Gravity album.

In August 2021, The Elovaters were entered into the New England Music Awards. They were nominated for three categories: "Act of the Year", "Live Act of the Year", and "Roots Act of the Year". The winners were announced on October 18, and The Elovaters won "Roots Act of the Year".

On December 26, 2021, The Elovaters won the most votes by Facebook, Instagram and Twitter users for the "2021 Album of the Year" by Surf Roots TV & Radio for their album Castles. This is the band's second time winning with the reggae rock streaming TV channel for Amazon Fire TV, Apple TV, and Roku, making them the first two-time winners.

The Elovaters were once again entered into the New England Music Awards for 2022. This time, they were nominated for four categories: "Artist of the Year", "Live Act of the Year", "Album of the Year" for Castles, and "Song of the Year" with "Margaritas". The winners were announced on November 13 during the award show at Six String Grill and Stage in Foxborough, MA. The band won "Artist Of The Year" and "Live Act of The Year".

The Elovaters were awarded "Best Reggae/Ska Artist” of the year at the 2022 Boston Music Awards.

== Tours ==
Over the years, the Elovaters have been an opening act for Pepper, Ziggy Marley, Easy Star All-Stars, the Movement, and Stick Figure. They have played in festivals such as the Sierra Nevada World Music Festival, Reggae Rise Up (both Florida and Utah), Levitate Music Festival, and One Love Cali Reggae Festival, and the California Roots Music and Arts Festival.

On September 11, 2021, the Elovaters was one of the headliners that opened for Slightly Stoopid, along with special performances by Stephen Marley, and Don Carlos & the Dub Vision Band at Petco Park, home of the San Diego Padres in San Diego, California.

The Elovaters joined Slightly Stoopid on their "Summer Traditions" Tour in the Summer of 2022. Openers included Pepper, Common Kings, and Fortunate Youth.

During the Summer of 2023, the Elovaters were on tour with Pepper and Stick Figure during their headlining "Wisdom Tour".

In the Summer of 2024, the Elovaters joined Dirty Heads and Slightly Stoopid on their "Slightly Dirty Summer Tour", which including opening bands, Common Kings and Fortunate Youth. Other acts in some cities included Passafire, HIRIE, Eli-Mac, and Johnny Cosmic & K Bong.

== Other projects ==
The Elovaters collaborated with Vitamin Sea Brewing, LLC in their home state Weymouth, Massachusetts on an IPA called "Criminal" (7%) after their single. The brewery describes it as, "smooth and full of soul, this one is packed with Juicy Simcoe and Sabro hops". They also have a special merchandise collection with the company, featuring the band's 'smoking bear' logo on beach towels, bags, and drink containers.

In November 2022, The Elovater's collaborated with Wine Boss to make a special reserve Cabernet Sauvignon that is named after the band's hit single, "Criminal". Inspired by Jackson Wetherbee's choice of wine that "paired well with the positive energy and the 'Getaway' feels of their music", it has notes of red fruit and hints of oak, vanilla and a touch of bell pepper. In February 2023, The Elovaters announced that "Criminal Cabernet" won a gold medal in the 2023 WineJudging.com wine tasting competition. There were over sixty judges at the event, representing various North American wine regions, evaluating 5,500 wines from nearly 1,000 wineries.

== Lineup ==
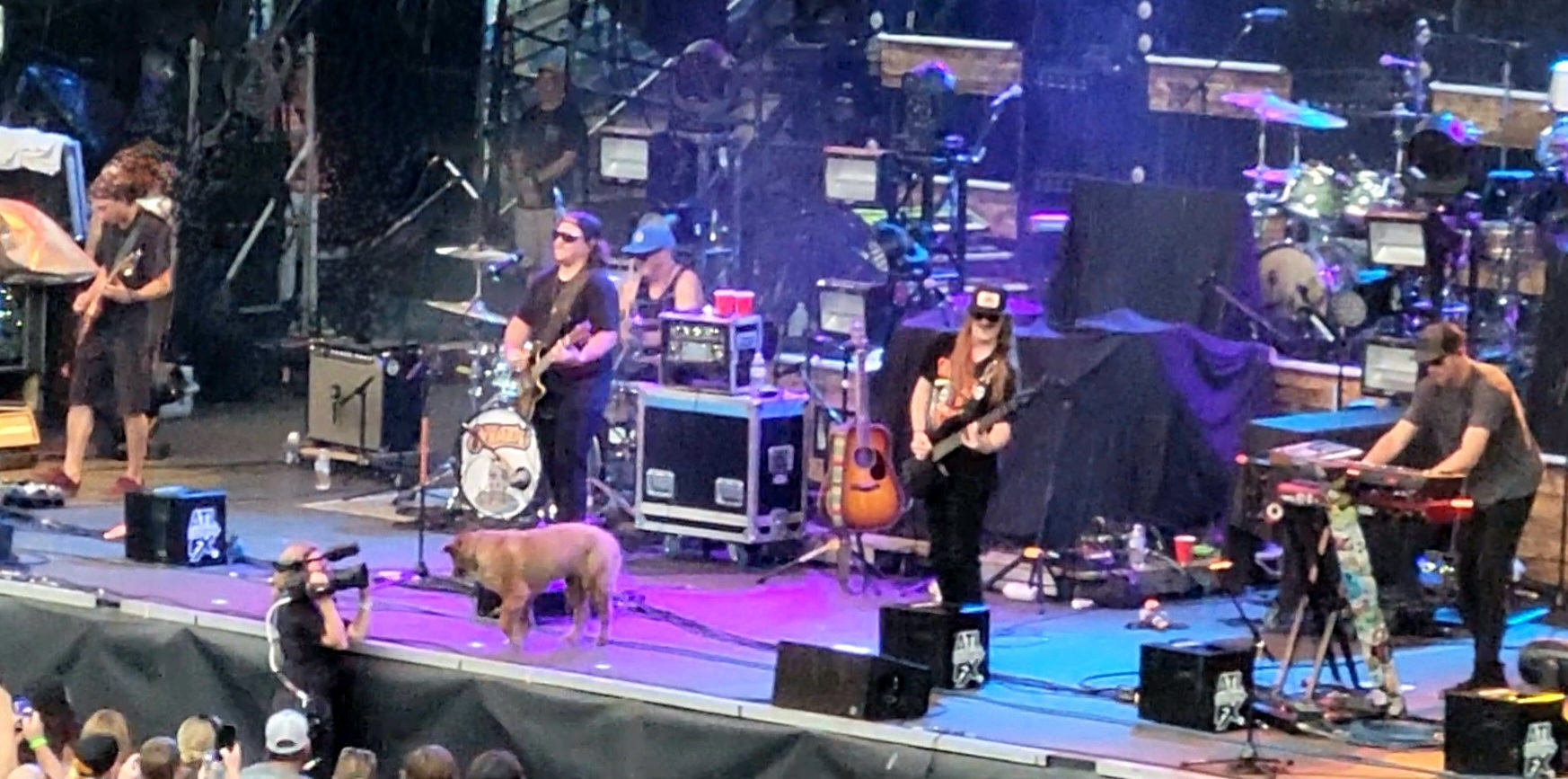
The Elovaters performing at the Westville Music Bowl in New Haven, CT in July 2023.

=== Current members ===
- Jackson Wetherbee – lead vocals, rhythm guitar (2014–present)
- John Alves – lead guitar (2014–present)
- Matt Link – bass (2018–present)
- Nick Asta – drums (2014–present)
- Derrick Cabral – percussion (2014–present)
- Greg Nectow – keyboard (2017–present)

Past

- Nick Frenay – trumpet, saxophone (2014–2017)
- Myles Sweeney – keyboard (2014–2017)
- Mark King - bass (2014–2016)

== Discography ==
=== Studio albums ===
The Elovaters Chart History
Year	Album	Label	Billboard peak
2017	The Cornerstone	Self-released	9
2018	Defy Gravity	Rootfire Cooperative	1
2021	Castles	Ineffable Music Group	—
2023	Endless Summer	Ineffable Music Group	—
2026	Shark Belly Motel	Ineffable Music Group	—

=== EPs/Live/Dub albums ===
The Elovaters Chart History
Year	Album	Label	Billboard peak
2019	Live @ Sugarshack Sessions (EP)	Sugarshack Records	8
2020	Double Vision (EP)	Ineffable Music Group	—
2020	Defy Dub (Dub album)	Ineffable Music Group	1

=== Singles ===
Title	Release date	Album
"Sunshine"	January 20, 2017	The Cornerstone
"Wind On My Back"	January 20, 2017	The Cornerstone
"Stop Arresting Johnny"	January 20, 2017	The Cornerstone
"House of the Stoic"	January 20, 2017	The Cornerstone
"Freedom"	January 20, 2017	The Cornerstone
"Don't Wanna Love You"	January 20, 2017	The Cornerstone
"Boston"	October 26, 2018	Defy Gravity
"Hold On"	October 26, 2018	Defy Gravity
"Gonna Shine"	October 26, 2018	Defy Gravity
"The Ladder"	October 26, 2018	Defy Gravity
"Meridian" (feat. The Late Ones)	October 26, 2018	Defy Gravity
"People Go"	October 26, 2018	Defy Gravity
"Shaking Off The Wolves"	October 26, 2018	Defy Gravity
"Live By The Day"	October 26, 2018	Defy Gravity
"Catch Your Wave" (feat. Organically Good Trio)	2019	(Single)
"Gonna Shine" (Live Acoustic)	2019	Live @ Sugarshack Sessions EP
"So Many Reasons" (Live Acoustic)	2019	Live @ Sugarshack Sessions EP
"Fast and Slow"	February 7, 2020	Double Vision EP
"Let It All Out" (feat. Brett Bollinger of Pepper)	March 6, 2020	Double Vision EP
"Nostalgia"	May 1, 2020	Double Vision EP
"Won't Be The Last Time" (feat. Giant Panda Guerilla Dub Squad)	May 1, 2020	Double Vision EP
"Sensimilla" (feat. Collie Buddz)	May 22, 2020	Cali Roots Riddim
"Meridian (Cosmic Dub)" (feat. Johnny Cosmic & KBong)	July 31, 2020	Defy Dub
"My Baby (E.N. Young Dub)"	August 7, 2020	Defy Dub
"So Many Reasons (Gaudi Dub)"	August 14, 2020	Defy Dub
"Cool Down (E.N. Young Dub)"	August 21, 2020	Defy Dub
"Boston (Green Lion Crew Dub)"	September 14, 2020	Defy Dub
"Get Ready" (Sublime cover)	January 15, 2021	The House That Bradley Built
"Criminal"	March 12, 2021	Castles
"Margaritas" (feat. Orange Grove)	April 23, 2021	Castles
"My Friend" (feat. The Movement & Keznamdi)	May 21, 2021	Castles
"DeLorean" (feat. Brother Ali & G. Love)	June 25, 2021	Castles
"Gardenia" (feat. Stick Figure)	July 30, 2021	Castles
"Gimme Love"	August 5, 2022	Endless Summer
"All Her Favorite Songs" (feat. Little Stranger)	January 13, 2023	Endless Summer
"Sunlight"	March 17, 2023	Endless Summer
"M.I.A."	April 28, 2023	Endless Summer
"Come and Get It"	June 9, 2023	Endless Summer
"Gimmie Love" (Acoustic)	April 25, 2024	Endless Summer (Deluxe)
"Endless Summer" (Deepend Remix)	April 26, 2024	Endless Summer (Deluxe)
"Sky High" (feat. Jared Watson of Dirty Heads)	July 12, 2024	Shark Belly Motel
"Roll Up" (feat. The Black Seeds)	August 16, 2024	Endless Summer (Deluxe)
"Red Wine" (feat. Corrella)	September 20, 2024	Endless Summer (Deluxe)
"Castaway" (feat. Draphto)	October 4, 2024	Endless Summer (Deluxe)
"Leave the Light on"	February 19, 2026	Shark Belly Motel
"Jean Jacket"	March 20, 2026	Shark Belly Motel
"Pockets Full Of Sand" (feat. Bryce Vine)	May 15, 2026	Shark Belly Motel
"Air Tonight"	May 15, 2026	Shark Belly Motel
"Tommy Bamhama"	May 15, 2026	Shark Belly Motel
"Wickedest Style"	May 15, 2026	Shark Belly Motel
"Wrong Idea"	May 15, 2026	Shark Belly Motel
"Children On The Run" (feat. DENM)	May 15, 2026	Shark Belly Motel
"Cut Em' Loose"	May 15, 2026	Shark Belly Motel
"Sandy Roads"	May 15, 2026	Shark Belly Motel
"Water Under The Bridge"	May 15, 2026	Shark Belly Motel
"Borderline"	May 15, 2026	Shark Belly Motel

== Collaborations ==
=== Featured artist ===
The Elovaters (Jackson Wetherbee) has collaborated or was featured on songs with artists and bands throughout the years.

- Bryce Vine - "Pockets Full Of Sand" (5/15/2026)
- DENM - "Children On The Run" (5/15/2026)
- O.A.R. – "Gonna Be Me (J-Vibe Version)" (feat. DJ Premier) (4/11/2025)
- Claire Wright – "If You Wanna Roll" (2/14/2025)
- Tropidelic – "Floating" (feat. Iration) (5/17/2024)
- Johnny Cosmic – "Georgia Rain" (2/9/2024)
- Tribal Seeds – "Mellow Mood" (2/9/2024)
- Dirty Heads – "Constellation" (6/8/2023)
- Passafire – "Keepin' On" Remix (feat. The Movement) (4/20/2023)
- Ballyhoo! – "Sleepin' on the Couch" (2/17/2023)
- Roots of Creation –"False Alarm" (2022)
- Shwayze – "Gone With The Wind" (2022)
- Surfer Girl – "Sunrise" (2022)
- Bumpin Uglies – "Everything Changes" (2022)
- Organically Good Trio – "Earthquake" (2022)
- Elliott Martin (John Brown's Body) – "Double Down" (2022)
- Joe Samba – "Losing It" (2022)
- Dale and the Z-Dubs – "This Time" (2022)
- Th3rd Coast Roots – "Have You Ever" (2022)
- Of Good Nature – "Valerie" (2021)
- Kyle Ahern – "You and Me" (feat. Kings and Comrades) (2020)
- Little Stranger – "I'm Fine" (2021)
- Artikal Sound System – "Spiritual Broadcaster" (2021)
- Mihali – "Greater Escape" (feat. The Movement) (2021)
- Dub Town Rockers – "On A Sunday" (2021)
- Dub Town Rockers – "Keep on the Sunny Side" (feat. Cas Haley) (2021)
- Dub Town Rockers – "Sweet Dreams" (feat. HIRIE) (2021)
- The Irie – "Turn Me Up" (2020)
- Tropidelic – "New World" (feat. Matisyahu & Bumpin Uglies) (2020)
- Indubious – "One By One" (2019)
- Signal Fire – "Too Late" (2019)
- Organically Good Trio – "Live By The Day" (2017)
- Chase Stebbins – "Summer Sun" (2015)
