= Little Stranger (band) =

American alternative hip hop group

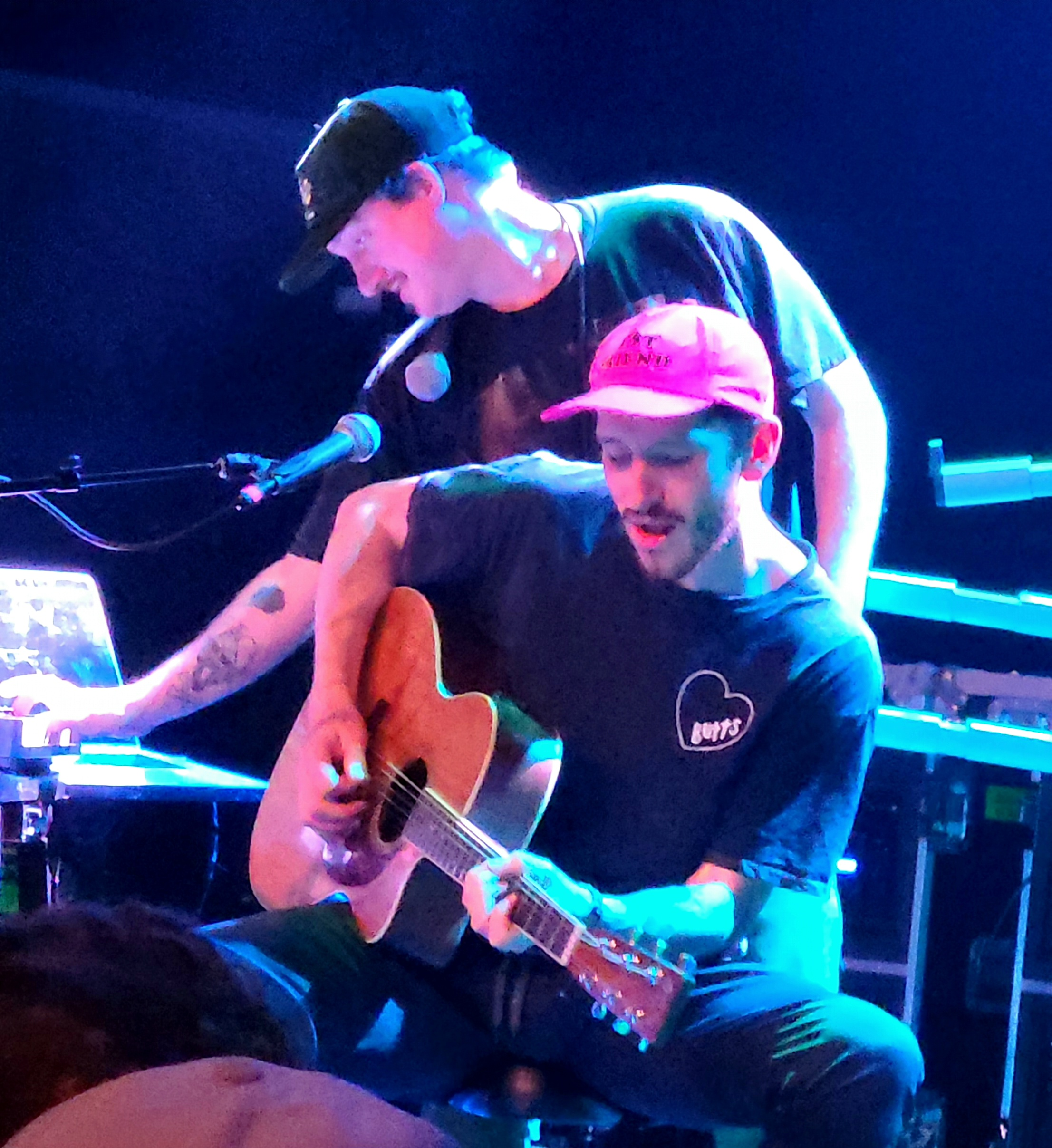
- Little Stranger (Kevin & John Shields) performing in New Jersey in 2022.

Background information
- Origin: Charleston, South Carolina, U.S.
- Genres: Alternative hip hop; reggae
- Years active: 2015–present
- Label: Ineffable Music Group
- Members: Kevin Shields; John Shields
- Website: littlestrangermusic.com

Little Stranger is an American alternative hip hop duo that formed in 2015. It consists of Kevin and John Shields, who are unrelated. They were born in Philadelphia, Pennsylvania, and started the group in Charleston, South Carolina.

== Members ==
- Kevin Shields (aka Classic Kevin) – Lead vocals/raps, melodica
- John Shields – Guitar, vocals/raps, keyboard

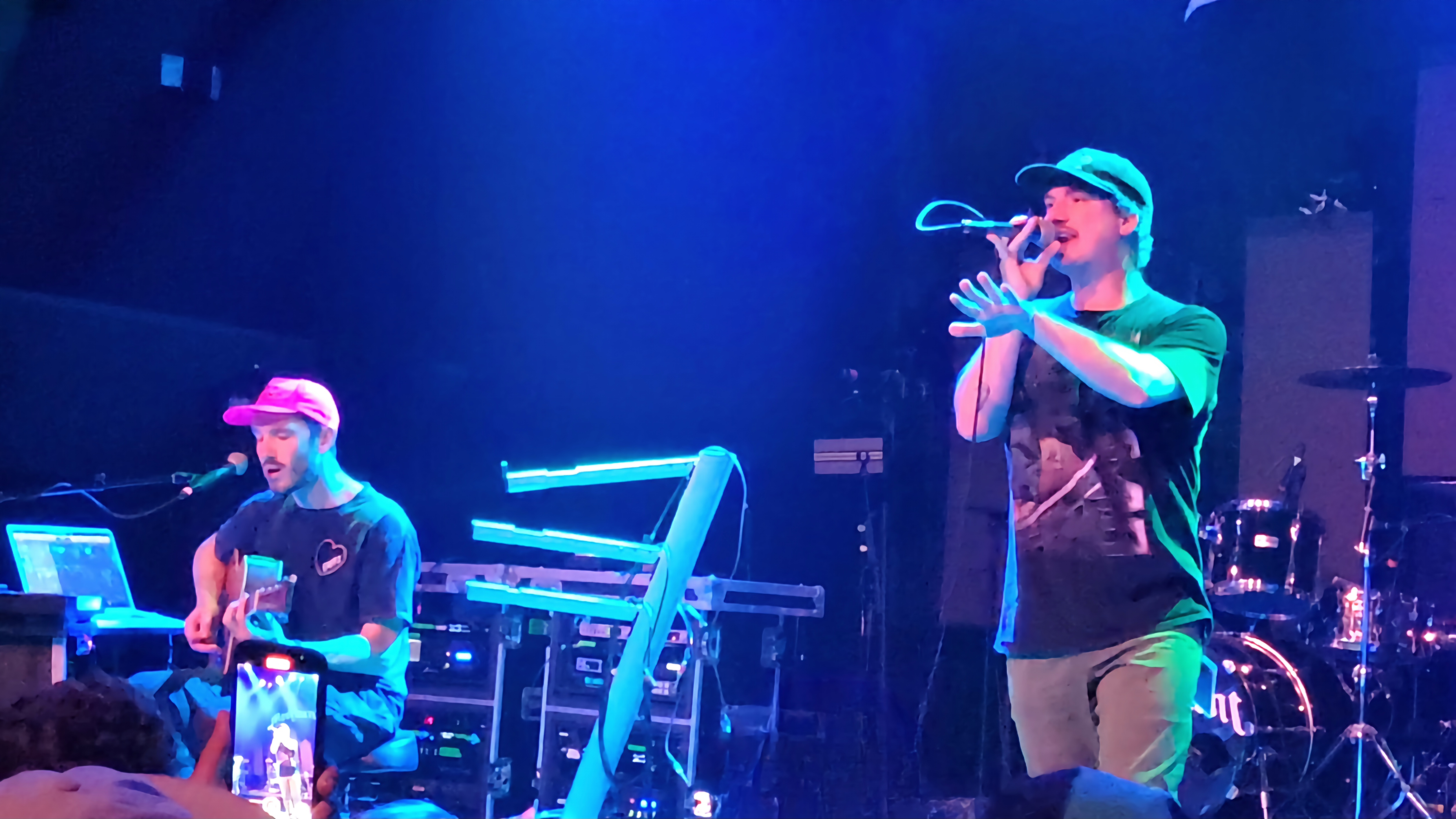
Little Stranger (left to right: John Shields & Kevin Shields) performing at White Eagle Hall in Jersey City, New Jersey on June 23, 2022

== Discography ==
=== Studio albums ===
| Year | Title | Release date | Label |
|---|---|---|---|
| 2015 | Buddha the Beast | October 26, 2015 | Self-released |
| 2021 | Trip Around Saturn | November 5, 2021 | Ineffable Music Group |
| 2024 | Sat Around Trippin | June 28, 2024 | Ineffable Music Group |
| 2026 | Broken Hearted Boys Club | July 17, 2026 | Ineffable Music Group |

=== EPs ===
| Year | Title | Release date | Label |
|---|---|---|---|
| 2017 | Techniques | May 19, 2017 | Self-released |
| 2018 | Styles & Dynamics | October 26, 2018 | Self-released |
| 2020 | Human Stranger (with Human Resources) | May 29, 2020 | Coast Records Better Noise Music |

=== Live albums ===
| Year | Title | Release date | Label |
|---|---|---|---|
| 2019 | Little Stranger (Live at Sugarshack Sessions) | November 15, 2019 | Sugarshack Records |
| 2023 | Little Stranger (Live at Sugarshack Sessions Vol. 2) | November 3, 2023 | Sugarshack Records |
| 2024 | Little Stranger and Friends (Live at Sugarshack Sessions) | December 27, 2024 | Sugarshack Records |

=== Singles ===
==== As lead artist ====
| Year | Title | Release date | Album |
|---|---|---|---|
| 2016 | "Queens of the Nile" | December 20, 2016 | Non-album single |
| 2017 | "Me & You" | April 19, 2017 | Techniques |
| 2020 | "Blister In The Sun" | August 14, 2020 | Non-album single |
| 2020 | "Christmas Jawn" | October 23, 2020 | Non-album single |
| 2021 | "Sunburn" (featuring Tropidelic) | August 6, 2021 | Trip Around Saturn |
| 2021 | "Red Rover" (featuring Jarv) | September 3, 2021 | Trip Around Saturn |
| 2021 | "Brain Fog" (featuring Del the Funky Homosapien) | October 1, 2021 | Trip Around Saturn |
| 2021 | "I'm Fine." (featuring The Elovaters) | October 29, 2021 | Trip Around Saturn |
| 2021 | "COLOSSO" (featuring Wrekonize) | November 4, 2021 | Trip Around Saturn |
| 2022 | "Coffee & a Joint" | April 20, 2022 | Trip Around Saturn (Deluxe) |
| 2022 | "UP2ME" (featuring Pip the Pansy) | July 1, 2022 | Trip Around Saturn (Deluxe) |
| 2023 | "Cool Kids" (featuring Jarv & Damn Skippy) | March 10, 2023 | Non-album single |
| 2023 | "Waste My Time" (with Collie Buddz) | June 29, 2023 | Cali Roots Riddim 2023 (by Collie Buddz) |
| 2024 | "Kama Sumatra" | February 2, 2024 | Sat Around Trippin' |
| 2024 | "Fly Guy" (with The Movement) | March 15, 2024 | Sat Around Trippin' |
| 2024 | "God at a Festival" (with Andy Frasco & The U.N. & Damn Skippy) | May 3, 2024 | Sat Around Trippin' |
| 2024 | "Sofia" | May 31, 2024 | Sat Around Trippin' |
| 2024 | "Mad Dumb" (with Wax) | June 28, 2024 | Sat Around Trippin' |
| 2024 | "Live Illegal" (with G. Love) | June 28, 2024 | Sat Around Trippin' |
| 2024 | "Busted Brain" (with Jarv) | June 28, 2024 | Sat Around Trippin' |

=== Collaborations ===
==== As featured artist ====
| Year | Title | Release date | Album |
|---|---|---|---|
| 2020 | "Bad Bad" (by Playboy Sideburn featuring Damn Skippy) | October 30, 2020 | Non-album single |
| 2022 | "Looking For It (Light Up Remix)" (by Of Good Nature featuring Tropidelic) | January 7, 2022 | Input (by Of Good Nature) |
| 2022 | "When I Wanna" (by Artikal Sound System) | January 14, 2022 | Welcome to Florida (by Artikal Sound System) |
| 2022 | "No Love" (by Bumpin Uglies) | July 29, 2022 | Mid-Atlantic Dub (by Bumpin Uglies) |
| 2022 | "All It Takes" (by Surfer Girl) | September 15, 2022 | Sunrise (by Surfer Girl) |
| 2022 | "Oh, What A Life" (by Andy Frasco & The U.N.) | September 28, 2022 | L'Optimist (by Andy Frasco & The U.N.) |
| 2023 | "All Her Favorite Songs" (by The Elovaters) | January 13, 2023 | Endless Summer (by The Elovaters) |
| 2023 | "Lemonade" (by Sierra Lane) | January 27, 2023 | Non-album single |
| 2023 | "Homewrecker" (by The Expendables) | June 9, 2023 | Pleasure Point (by The Expendables) |
| 2023 | "Stash" (by Passafire) | July 14, 2023 | Remember A Time (by Passafire) |
| 2023 | "Chainz [Remix]" (by The Movement) | August 3, 2023 | Always With Me (Deluxe) (by The Movement) |
| 2023 | "Puerto Rico" (by Wax) | September 1, 2023 | Non-album single |
| 2023 | "Batshit Crazy" (by Artikal Sound System) | October 6, 2023 | Non-album single |
| 2023 | "High With You" (by Badfish) | December 15, 2023 | Non-album single |
| 2024 | "Pretend" (by Big B featuring Killer Mike and Jakob Nowell) | October 24, 2024 | Non-album single |
| 2024 | "We Are" (by Mihali) | November 15, 2024 | Non-album single |
