= Bumpin Uglies =

American ska/punk/reggae band

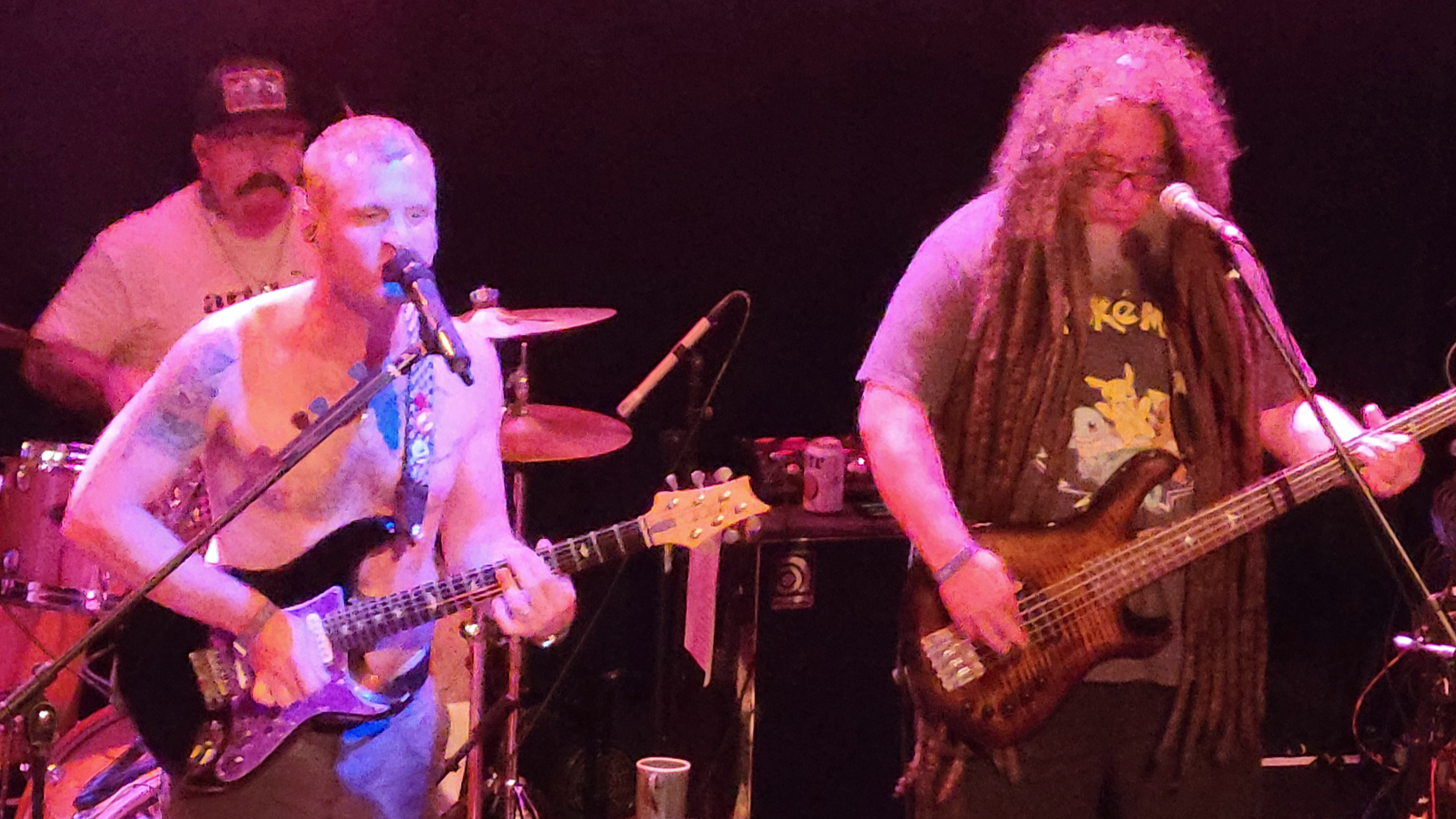
- Bumpin Uglies performing in 2021

Background information
- Origin: Annapolis, Maryland, U.S.
- Genres: Reggae, ska, punk
- Years active: (2008–present)
- Labels: Space Duck; CD Baby; Right Coast Records; Ineffable Records
- Members: Brandon Hardesty; T.J. Haslett; Will Lopez; Ethan Lee Lichtenberger Brent Schraffenberger
- Past members: Zach Pfefferkorn; Ben McNulty; Keenan Leader; Bruce Givens; Mike Breach; Chad Wright; Dave Wolf
- Website: Official website

Bumpin Uglies is an American band from Annapolis, Maryland. AllMusic described their music as a "melody-driven, free-spirited blend of ska, reggae, and punk with a strong focus on lyrics and crowd-pleasing grooves." The band was influenced by pioneering bands Sublime, Bad Religion, Reel Big Fish, and Goldfinger.

== History ==
=== Formation and Free Candy (2008–2011) ===
The group was founded in 2008 by guitarist and vocalist Brandon Hardesty, and percussionist Zach Pfefferkorn. The band name came from Zach, who threw out the idea of Bumpin' Uglies as they were trying to think of the funniest and most memorable band name possible.

Later, Ben McNulty joined as a bass player and Keenan Leader joined as the drummer. Since then the band has refined its sound with complimentary musicians, ending with the current band consisting of Brandon Hardesty, Dave Wolf, T.J. Haslett, and Ethan Lichtenberger.

The band's first full-length album Free Candy was released on June 11, 2011, and was a strong debut. The release party was thrown at "The Whiskey", a former music venue in Annapolis, Maryland. It featured the singles "Addictive Personality" and "Hallucinations".

=== Go Folk Yourself and Ninjah: Reggae Assassins (2012–2014) ===
A year later on June 17, 2012, Go Folk Yourself, their second album, was released.

Then another rapid release, their third LP, titled Ninjah: Reggae Assassins, premiered on May 28, 2013, with their first single, "Morning After".

The next year, they followed up with a live album titled Load In/Load Out: Live at 8x10, released on April 8, 2014.

Since these albums, Bumpin Uglies went from regional favorites on the East Coast, first starting out in clubs and smaller venues, to a more national draw, with heavily touring all over the United States, then onto bigger festivals.

=== Touring and EPs (2015–2016) ===
While continuously touring, their first EP, Freakout Hell Bus, was released on June 2, 2015. A followup EP, Sublime With No One, was released on October 16, 2015, and garnered as much attention from its title as the new songs it contained. Their third EP, Better. Faster. Stronger, was released on June 4, 2016.

=== Keep It Together and Beast from the East (2016) ===
The band's fourth album, Keep It Together, was released on September 9, 2016, on Right Coast Records.

In December 2016, the trio became a quartet when they added a fourth member, Chad Wright, on keyboard and some vocals. His first album with the band was their fifth LP, Beast from the East, their most acclaimed album, which released on April 6, 2018. The band had four Billboard Top Reggae Album of the Week placements, including a #1 spot with Beast From The East on April 21, 2018.

They are currently signed to Ineffable Records.

The band recorded their first acoustic album, Songs From the Basement on September 26, 2017, which featured acoustic versions of popular singles from their past albums.

=== Buzz EP and live acoustic album (2019) ===
On March 22, 2019, the band released their fourth EP, titled Buzz, a six-song complication, including their single "Buzz", featuring friends, Tropidelic. They released Live @ Sugarshack Sessions, their second acoustic album, on October 4, 2019.

=== Keep Your Suitcase Packed (2020) ===
Their sixth album, Keep Your Suitcase Packed, was released on Ineffable Records on June 12, 2020. The album featured singles "Florida Showers" (feat. Leilani Wolfgramm), "I Just Am", and "Suburbia". Shortly after the release, Chad Wright left the band to concentrate on other projects. He was replaced on keyboard by Ethan Lichtenberger, who also plays the trumpet and trombone.

=== 'The Never Ending Drop' project (2020–2021) ===
In 2020 and 2021, the band worked on their own project called "The Never Ending Drop". In a year when they had to stop touring due to the COVID-19 pandemic, Hardesty explained, "we decided to double down on the music making portion of our job description", and then released a single every month; whether if it was a viral video, acoustic set or a studio track released to stream.

Bumpin Uglies was featured as one of many reggae bands on Collie Buddz riddim album, Cali Roots Riddim 2020 with their single, "Mid-Atlantic Dub", which was produced by Buddz and mixed by Stick Figure's touring guitarist, producer Johnny Cosmic.

On January 15, 2021, Bumpin Uglies was one of several reggae and punk bands on The House That Bradley Built, a charity compilation honoring Sublime's lead singer Bradley Nowell, helping musicians with substance abuse. They covered Sublime's song "Same In The End".

=== Mid-Atlantic Dub (2022) ===
Bumpin Uglies recorded their seventh studio album, Mid-Atlantic Dub, released on September 16, 2022. The 13-track album features special guests; Ballyhoo!, The Elovaters, Little Stranger, Jacob Hemphill of SOJA, Trevor Young, Wax and Tropidelic.

Mid-Atlantic Dub is also being "considered" for a Grammy Award nomination "Best Reggae Album" at the 65th Grammy Awards in 2023.

Bumpin Uglies was one of the many featured reggae rock artists on Crossed Heart Clothing presents Pop Punk Goes Reggae, Vol. 1, which was produced by frontman Nathan Aurora of Iya Terra. The 16-track album was released on September 15, 2023, by Ineffable Records. The band covered "Hands Down" by Dashboard Confessional.

=== Lyrics Over Everything (2024) ===
On June 21, 2024, Bumpin Uglies released their eighth full-length studio album, titled Lyrics Over Everything on Controlled Substance Sounds. The 14-track album is produced by Howie Spangler of Ballyhoo!, as well as self-produced by the band. It blends reggae, rock, punk, and ska with Brandon Hardesty's master of lyrics on emotionally new and remastered songs. Special guests featured are G. Love and Special Sauce, Kyle Smith, Joint Operation, The Grilled Lincolns, and Maryland musician Joey Harkum.

== Other projects ==
Bumpin Uglies created a custom beer with Maryland's RAR Brewing to celebrate the release of the band's latest album, Mid-Atlantic Dub. The limited edition Mid-Atlantic Dub Lime Lager 16 ounce can was available exclusively at OktoberWest (West Virginia's "largest beer festival") in Charleston, West Virginia on September 24, 2022.

== Lineup ==
=== Current members ===
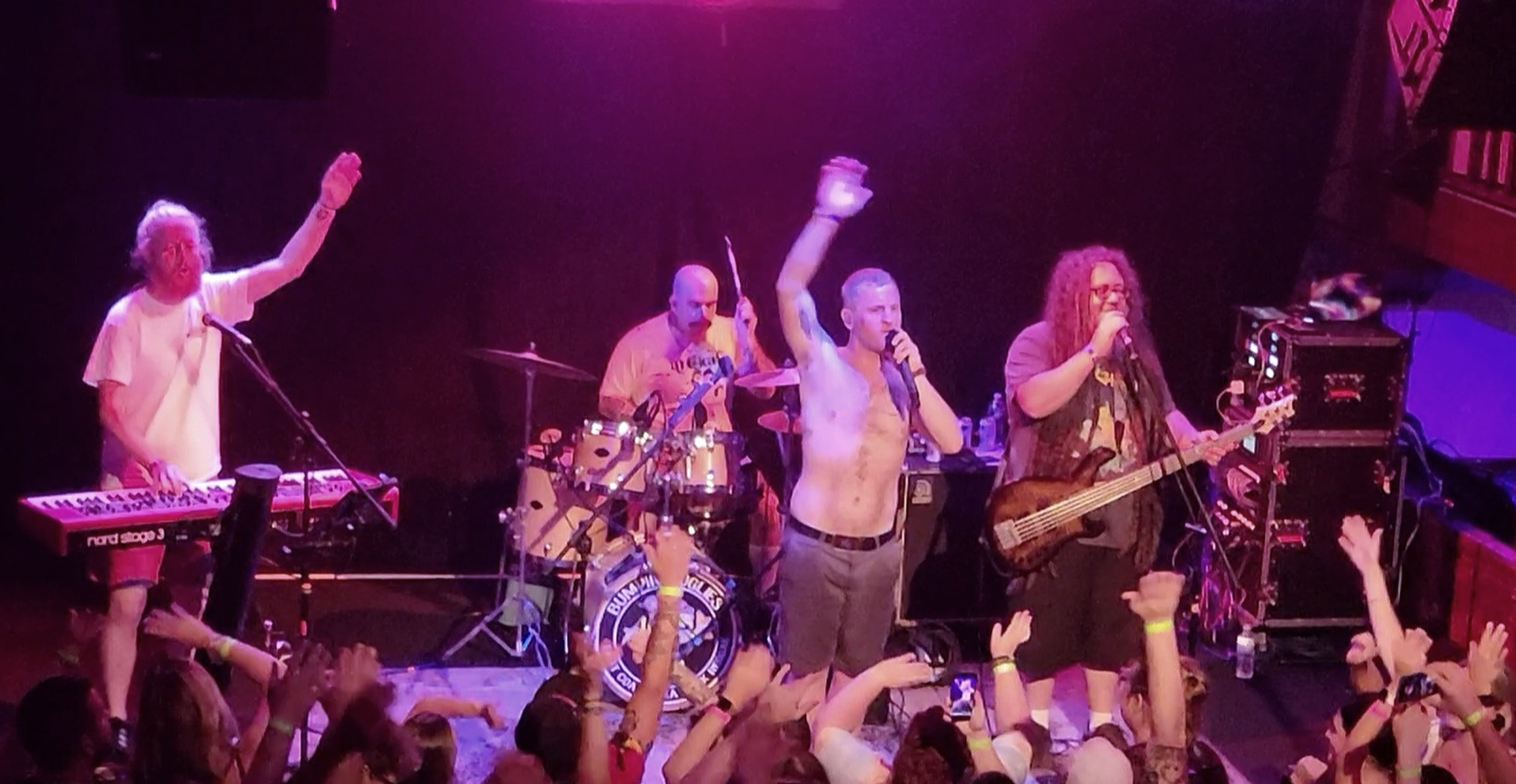
Bumpin Uglies performing (with new member Ethan) at Bird & Betty's in Beach Haven, New Jersey on July 11, 2021

- Brandon Hardesty – lead vocals, guitar, songwriter (2008–present)
- T.J. Haslett – drums (2015–present)
- Ethan Lee Lichtenberger – keyboard, trombone (2021–present)
- Will Lopez – tenor saxophone, guitar (2022–present)
- Brent Schraffenberger – bass, guitar, vocals (2024-present)

=== Former members ===
- Zach Pfefferkorn – percussion (2008–2009)
- Ben McNulty – bass (2008–2010)
- Keenan Leader – drums (2008–2013)
- Mike Breach (2009–2010)
- Chad Wright – keyboard, vocals (2017–2020)
- Dave "Wolfie" Wolf – bass, vocals (2010–2024)

== Discography ==
=== Studio albums ===
Bumpin Uglies chart history
Year	Album	Label	Billboard peak
2011	Free Candy	Self-released	—
2012	Go Folk Yourself	Self-released	—
2013	Ninjah: Reggae Assassins	CD Baby	—
2016	Keep It Together	Right Coast Records	#3
2018	Beast From The East	Space Duck Records	#1
2020	Keep Your Suitcase Packed	Ineffable Records	—
2022	Mid-Atlantic Dub	Ineffable Records	TBD
2024	Lyrics Over Everything	Ineffable Records	TBD

=== Live albums/EPs ===
Bumpin Uglies chart history
Year	Album	Label	Billboard peak
2014	Load In/Load Out: Live at 8x10	N/A	—
2015	Freakout Hell Bus (EP)	N/A	—
2015	Sublime With No One (EP)	N/A	—
2016	Better. Faster. Stronger (EP)	N/A	#2
2016	Songs From the Basement (Acoustic EP)	N/A	—
2019	Buzz (EP)	Ineffable Records	#2
2019	Live @ Sugarshack Sessions	Sugarshack Records	—

=== Singles ===
Title	Release date	Album
"Addictive Personality"	June 11, 2011	Free Candy
"Hallucinations"	June 11, 2011	Free Candy
"Burn My Candle"	June 11, 2011	Free Candy
"Nine Words"	June 11, 2011	Free Candy
"They Remain"	June 11, 2011	Free Candy
"Morning After"	June 17, 2012	Go Folk Yourself
"One Foot in Front of the Other"	June 17, 2012	Go Folk Yourself
"Pocket of Ones"	May 28, 2013	Ninjah: Reggae Assassins
"Struggling"	May 28, 2013	Ninjah: Reggae Assassins
"White Boy Reggae"	May 28, 2013	Ninjah: Reggae Assassins
"Grind"	May 28, 2013	Ninjah: Reggae Assassins
"Free Taste"	May 28, 2013	Ninjah: Reggae Assassins
"Dayman"	2013	It's Always Sunny in Philadelphia
"Grass Is Greener"	May 29, 2015	Freakout Hell Bus
"Bad Decisions"	May 29, 2015	Freakout Hell Bus
"Nostalgia"	October 16, 2015	Sublime With No One
"Fuck It"	October 16, 2015	Sublime With No One
"DIY"	May 15, 2016	Better. Faster. Stronger
"Sorry I'm Not Sorry"	September 9, 2016	Keep It Together
"Stop The Fall"	September 9, 2016	Keep It Together
"Load In Load Out"	September 9, 2016	Keep It Together
"Oh! Darling" (The Beatles Cover)	February 8, 2017	(Single)
"Crazy"	April 6, 2018	Beast From The East
"Hard Liquor" (feat. Ballyhoo!, Sun-Dried Vibes & Oogee Wawa)	April 6, 2018	Beast From The East
"Budtender" (feat. Gary Dread)	April 6, 2018	Beast From The East
"All In Stride" (feat. Passafire)	April 6, 2018	Beast From The East
"Radio" (feat. Tropidelic)	April 6, 2018	Beast From The East
"Island Time"	January 1, 2019	Buzz (EP)
"Buzz" (feat. Tropidelic)	January 1, 2019	Buzz (EP)
"Buzz" (Live Acoustic) (feat. Tropidelic)	October 4, 2019	Live @ Sugarshack Sessions
"Money"	August 16, 2019	(Single)
"Mid-Atlantic Dub" (feat. Collie Buddz)	May 22, 2020	Cali Roots Riddim 2020 (Single)
"Suitcase"	June 12, 2020	Keep Your Suitcase Packed
"I Just Am"	June 12, 2020	Keep Your Suitcase Packed
"New Socks"	June 12, 2020	Keep Your Suitcase Packed
"Suburbia"	June 12, 2020	Keep Your Suitcase Packed
"Florida Showers" (feat. Leilani Wolfgramm)	June 12, 2020	Keep Your Suitcase Packed
"Underinsured"	November 13, 2020	The Never-Ending Drop (Project) (Single)
"Serotonin"	December 11, 2020	The Never-Ending Drop (Project) (Single)
"Predator" (feat. Vana Liya)	January 8, 2021	The Never-Ending Drop (Project) (Single)
"Same In The End" (Sublime cover)	January 15, 2021	The House That Bradley Built (Single)
"Loud & Clear"	February 11, 2021	The Never-Ending Drop (Project) (Single)
"Roles We Play"	March 12, 2021	The Never-Ending Drop (Project) (Single)
"Cali Sober" (feat. Kaleo Wassman of Pepper)	April 8, 2021	The Never-Ending Drop (Project) (Single)
"Too Stoned" (feat. Artikal Sound System)	May 14, 2021	The Never-Ending Drop (Project) (Single)
"Right & Clever"	June 18, 2021	The Never-Ending Drop (Project) (Single)
"Machanics & Barstools" (feat. Joey Harkum)	July 23, 2021	The Never-Ending Drop (Project) (Single)
"Slow Burn" (feat. Jacob Hemphill of SOJA)	January 14, 2022	Mid-Atlantic Dub (Single)
"Make It Through The Day"	March 25, 2022	Mid-Atlantic Dub (Single)
"Everything Changes" (feat. The Elovaters)	June 24, 2022	Mid-Atlantic Dub (Single)
"No Love" (feat. Little Stranger)	July 29, 2022	Mid Atlantic Dub (Single)
"Wild Girls"	October 3, 2022	Mid Atlantic Dub (Single)
"Healthy Competition" (feat. Tropidelic & Ballyhoo!)	December 22, 2022	Mid Atlantic Dub (Single)
"Hands Down" (Dashboard Confessional Reggae Cover)	August 25, 2023	Pop Punk Goes Reggae, Vol. 1 (Single)
"Cheat Codes"	March 15, 2024	Lyrics Over Everything (Single)
"Passion is Contagious" (feat. Kyle Smith)	April 19, 2024	Lyrics Over Everything (Single)
"Lyrics Over Everything" (feat. Joey Harkum)	May 14, 2024	Lyrics Over Everything (Single)
"Maryland Boys" (feat. The Grilled Lincolns and Joint Operation)	June 21, 2024	Lyrics Over Everything (Single)
