= Rootfire Cooperative =

American not-for-profit record label

- Founded: 2016
- Founder: Seth Herman
- Genre: Reggae, Independent
- Country of origin: United States
- Official website: Official website

Rootfire Cooperative is an American not-for-profit record label that was created in 2016, which specializes in zero interest micro loans for bands. It is a partnership between Rootfire and Ineffable Music Group. Artists maintain 100% ownership of their music. The microloan program is also supported by merchandise and music shows.

== Background ==
“Launched in the spring of 2016, Rootfire Cooperative is a partnership between Rootfire and Ineffable Music Group that offers interest-free microloans to artists.” – as featured in Forbes, Aug 22, 2017. The intention behind developing the label services program was to provide interest-free loans for the production and marketing of recorded music.

The Movement’s album Golden was the first release on Rootfire Cooperative, followed by albums from HIRIE, Giant Panda Guerilla Dub Squad, The Holdup, Satsang, and Nattali Rize.

In April 2016, the label released their first album by The Movement titled Golden which hit #1 in the Billboard and iTunes Reggae charts

In August 2016, they released Hirie's sophomore album Wandering Soul. The album topped the Reggae Billboard chart and was the first time a female reggae artist topped the chart since Joss Stone's album "Water" from August 2015.

In September 2016, the label released their third Billboard topping album titled Make It Better by Giant Panda Guerilla Dub Squad. The album debut at #1 on Billboard's Reggae chart.

In 2017, Rootfire Cooperative released Rebel Frequency by Nattali Rize, followed by "Pyramid(s)" from Satsang, topping the Billboard Reggae chart for a fourth time in the label's first year of operation.

== Official Rootfire Cooperative Records releases ==
- Steel Pulse – Mass Manipulation – TBD
- The Elovaters – Defy Gravity – October 26, 2018
- For Peace Band – Always Love – July 27, 2018
- The Expanders – Blood Morning – January 23, 2018
- Thunder Body – Solstice - October 13, 2017
- Nattali Rize – Rebel Frequency - March 24, 2017
- Satsang – Pyramid(s) March 20, 2017
- The Holdup – Leaves In The Pool - December 1, 2016
- Giant Panda Guerilla Dub Squad – Make It Better - September 16, 2016
- HIRIE – Wandering Soul - August 19, 2016
- The Movement (reggae band) – Golden - April 8, 2016
