= The Palmer Squares =

American hip-hop duo

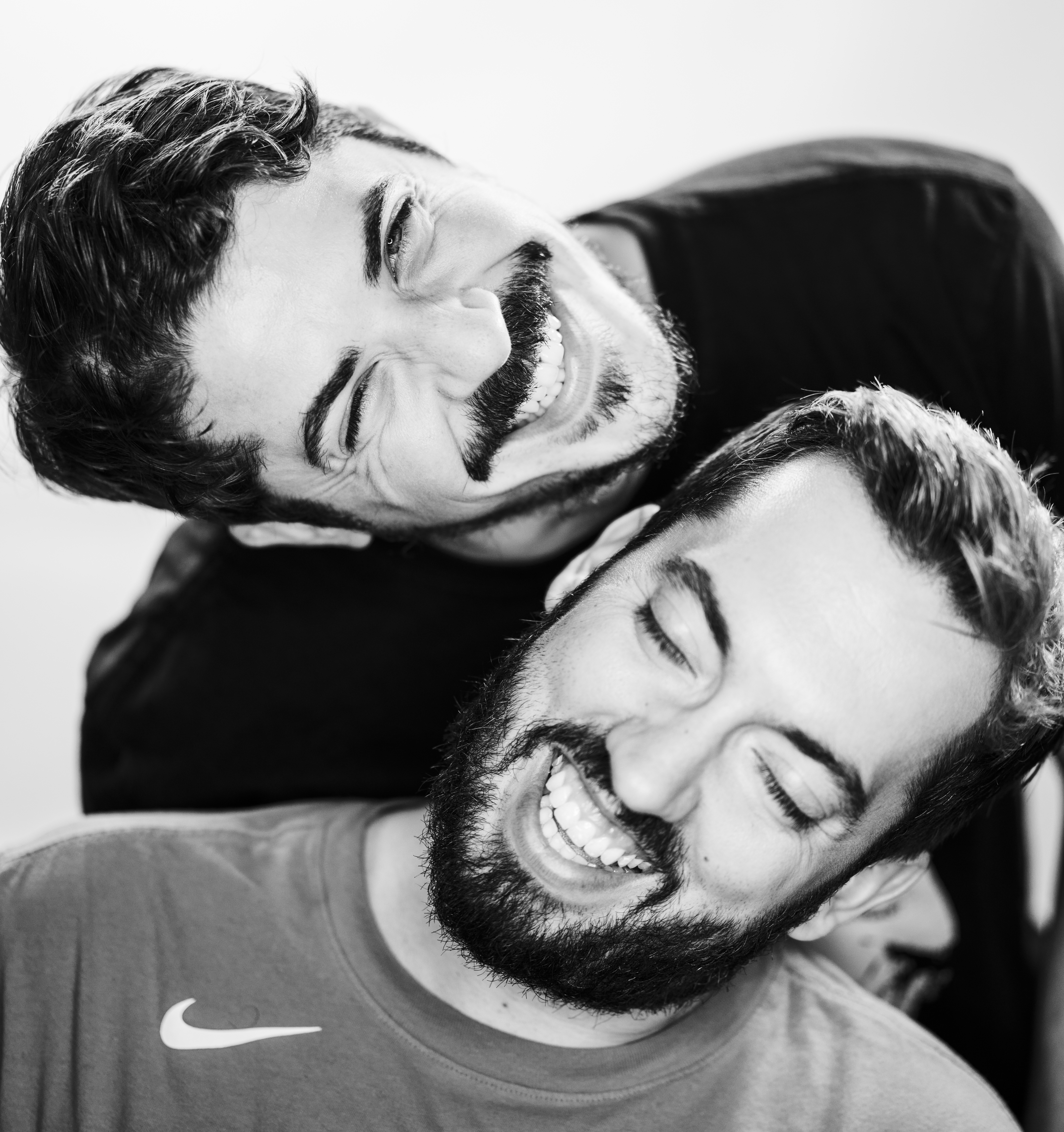
- The Palmer Squares in 2022

Background information
- Origin: Chicago, Illinois
- Genre: Hip-hop
- Occupation: Rappers
- Years active: 2010–present
- Label: Spooky Language LLC
- Members: Acumental; Term K
- Website: thepalmersquares.com

The Palmer Squares are a Chicago-based hip-hop duo composed of Acumental (Ac) and Terminal Knowledge (Term K). The two generated a following on YouTube and have since released four studio albums.

== History ==
Friends since childhood, they began writing music together in high school, calling themselves Ordinary Dogs, and later iLLiteracy. In 2010 they changed their name to The Palmer Squares, after the Chicago neighborhood they were living in at the time. They gained early notoriety on YouTube, participating in various cyphers and have gone on to release a number of studio albums, EPs, and mixtapes. The duo continues to tour North America and produces a weekly podcast titled TPS Reports Podcast.

== Personal lives ==
The Palmer Squares were born Ronald Matt Brands and Seth Zamost and both grew up in Wheeling, IL, a northwest suburb of Chicago. Brands, an only child, was first exposed to hip-hop at an early age and played percussion in school band programs. He attended Columbia College for Cinema & Television Arts. Zamost, the youngest of three, was raised in a very musical household, and his father Paul Zamost is a founding member of Chicago punk band The Effigies. Zamost attended the American Academy of Art in Chicago and has a BFA for illustration.

== Music career ==
=== YouTube ===
In 2011, they gained notoriety on YouTube by uploading long-form one-take rap videos and participating in various cyphers with artists such as Wax and Dumbfoundead. Their videos have garnered over 21 million views.

=== EPs and Finna ===
In 2012 The Palmer Squares recorded and released their first two EP's titled Spooky Language and Square Tactics. Spooky Language was produced by Nate Kiz and is heavily influenced by comedian George Carlin, containing numerous vocal samples and borrowing its name from one of his comedy routines. Square Tactics was produced by Canadian beat maker D.R.O.. In October 2013 the Palmer Squares made their official full-length album debut with Finna. The project was released through the group's newly formed independent record label Stank Face Records and features appearances from Saba, Kembe X, and ProbCause.

=== Stank Face Records ===
Over the course of the next year they added fellow Chicago rappers Will is Chillin', Rebel Legato, Vantablac Sol, Loud Mouth, and producer Irineo to the Stank Face collective. In October 2014, Stank Face Records released the all-inclusive collaborative album Face Melt with each track featuring two or more members over production from Irineo, D.R.O. or Drew Mantia, who would go on to become the group's sole engineer and an integral part of Stank Face.

In May 2015, The Palmer Squares released the mixtape In Context, made up of songs that would not make the cut for their upcoming album. A year later in May 2016 they released their second studio album titled Planet of The Shapes, boasting features from Watsky and fellow Chicago emcee Psalm One. the album explored the bounds of The Palmer Squares' sound.

On June 12, 2017, The Palmer Squares released the EP, NaPalm with producer Nate Kiz, as a follow-up to Spooky Language.

After a tour across North America, titled "The No More Jobs Tour", The Palmer Squares announced a project of the same name, which they created with their tour mates, Vantablac Sol & Netherfriends, during the tours' downtime. It was Released on March 6, 2018.

In October 2018, The Palmer Squares & ProbCause collaborated on an album titled, Junkyard Samurai. The album was produced by Drew Mantia and released independently.

=== Post Stank Face ===
In 2019 The Palmer Squares dissolved Stank Face Records after legal disputes with previous management.

On July 29, 2019, The Palmer Squares and ProbCause, as Junkyard Samurai, released a 4-song project of remixed versions of previously released collaborations called REMASK. The project was produced by Drew Mantia.

On March 10, 2020, The Palmer Squares released their third studio album With or Without It.

== Discography ==
Studio Albums

Title	Album details
Finna	Released: October 22, 2013; Label: Spooky Language LLC; Formats: CD and Digital Download
Planet of The Shapes	Released: May 25, 2016; Label: Spooky Language LLC; Formats: CD and Digital Download
With or Without It	Released: March 10, 2020; Label: Spooky Language LLC; Formats: Vinyl, CD and Digital Download

Mixtapes

Title	Mixtape Details
First That, Now This	Released: December 2, 2010; Label: Independent; Formats: Digital Download
In Context	Released: May 27, 2015; Label: Spooky Language LLC; Formats: Digital Download

EPs

Title	EP Details
Spooky Language	Released: May 8, 2012; Label: Spooky Language LLC; Formats: Vinyl, CD and Digital Download; Entirely produced by Nate Kiz
Square Tactics	Released: December 11, 2012; Label: Spooky Language LLC; Formats: CD and Digital Download; Entirely produced by D.R.O.
NaPalm	Released: June 12, 2017; Label: Spooky Language LLC; Formats: Vinyl, CD and Digital Download; Entirely produced by Nate Kiz

Collaborative Projects

Title	Collab Details
Face Melt	With Stank Face Crew; Released: October 30, 2014; Label: Stank Face Records; Formats: CD and Digital Download
No More Jobs Tour	With Netherfriends and Vantablac SOL; Released: March 14, 2018; Label: Spooky Language LLC; Formats: Digital Download
Junkyard Samurai	With ProbCause (As Junkyard Samurai); Released: October 26, 2018; Label: Independent; Formats: CD and Digital Download; Entirely produced by Drew Mantia
REMASK	With ProbCause (As Junkyard Samurai); Released: July 29, 2019; Label: Independent; Formats: Digital Download; Entirely produced by Drew Mantia
