= Ballyhoo! =

American reggae rock, punk band

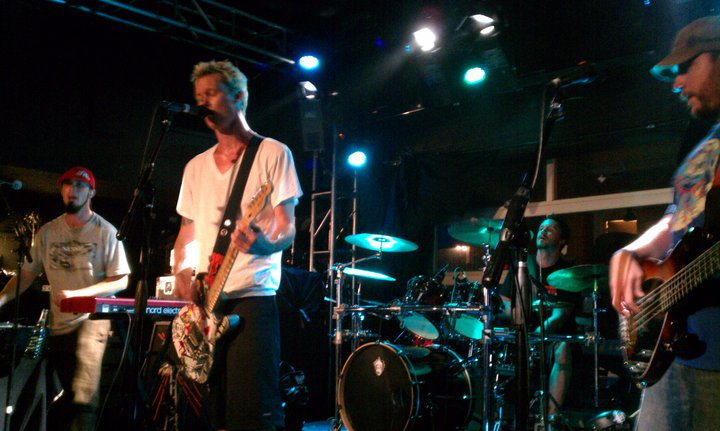
- Ballyhoo! in concert

Background information
- Origin: Aberdeen, Maryland, U.S.
- Genres: Alternative rock; Reggae rock; Pop rock; Punk rock
- Years active: 1995–present
- Labels: Ineffable Records; LAW Records; Surfdog Records; Right Coast Records
- Members: Howi Spangler; Donald Spangler; Scott Vandrey; Nick Lucera; Mike Bush
- Past members: J.R. Gregory; Cassius King; Josh Farley; Sebastian Tenorio-Vallejo
- Website: ballyhoorocks.com

Ballyhoo! is an American reggae rock and punk band from Aberdeen, Maryland. The group has sold over 30,000 copies of its five albums and more than 200,000 digital tracks.

Ballyhoo! played the House of Marley Stage on the Warped Tour of 2012. The band has opened up for bands 311, Dirty Heads, Tribal Seeds, and Slightly Stoopid on previous tours. The group played over 166 shows in 2012.

== History ==
=== Formation (1995) ===
Ballyhoo! was formed in July 1995 by brothers Howi Spangler (vocals and guitar) and Donald Spangler (drums) with their friend Josh Farley on bass. In 1997, Farley left the band, and Cassius King took over on bass.

=== 365-Day Weekend (2000) ===
In 2000, Ballyhoo! released their debut album, 365-Day Weekend around the same time they became a quartet with the addition of Scott Vandrey on keyboard. Next, they released their first EP titled The Green in 2004. Both were released on Hooligan Records.

=== Do It For The Money! (2006) ===
The band's self-released second album Do It For The Money! in 2006 (produced by Jerome Maffeo) featured their first singles, "Cali Girl" and "Cerveza". After this release, the band switched bassists again, from Cassius King to J.R. Gregory.

=== Cheers! (2009) ===
The follow-up third album, Cheers!, released in 2009 on Surfdog Records, was produced by Scotch Ralston (311 collaborator). The album also features mix work by 311 drummer, Chad Sexton.

Ballyhoo! released a single, "Front Porch", in October 2010 (produced by Jerome Maffeo).

=== Daydreams (2011) ===
The band's fourth album, Daydreams, was the group's first release under Pepper's LAW Records. The 12-track album was recorded and produced at Sound Lounge studios in Orlando, Florida, by Greg Shields and Mike Stebe and released in September 2011. The album debuted at No. 1 on the iTunes Reggae Charts, as well as No. 4 on Amazon. Their single "Last Night" saw rotation at various alternative radio stations, including WHFS Baltimore, WRFF Philadelphia, KUKQ Phoenix, Star 101.9 Honolulu, and SiriusXM's Faction, as well as various specialty shows around the country. The band's second single "Walk Away" opened even more doors at radio stations with its melodic chorus and sing along vibe. Pepper's drummer Yesod Williams and owner of his band's label LAW Records says of his newest addition, "Having Ballyhoo! join the LAW family is a perfect fit. They are an incredibly talented band with a really catchy style."

By this time, Ballyhoo! was listed on MTV's "Top 100 Bands to Watch" by the Artist on the Verge Project and even featured two downloadable songs on the popular video game Rock Band.

After heavily touring across the country, Ballyhoo! released a compilation album titled Medium Rare: A collection of tasty cuts on December 22, 2012. This was a collection of live tracks, unreleased songs and early versions of their favorite songs.

=== Pineapple Grenade!! (2013) ===
Pineapple Grenade!!, Ballyhoo!'s fifth album, was recorded in three weeks in January 2013 and was released on June 25, 2013. This is the first album produced under Right Coast Records, Ballyhoo!'s record label. All songs were produced by Paul Leary (Sublime) and Matt Wallace (Maroon 5, Faith No More). Their first single, "Run", saw much radio play. Their second single, "No Good", was produced by Rome Ramirez from Sublime with Rome. The album climbed the Billboard Top 200 album chart at No. 189, as well as reaching No. 4 Billboard Heatseekers and No. 5 at iTunes Alternative charts.

On February 26, 2013, Ballyhoo! released a single, "Marijuana Laws". After both releases, Nick Lucera took over as the band's bassist after J.R. Gregory's departure in 2014.

=== Girls. (2017) ===
The same year, the band released The Cool Down, Vol. 1 EP, along with their single "Mixtape", which was later featured on their sixth studio album, Girls. which was released on March 17, 2017, on their label Right Coast Records.

=== Detonate (2018) ===
The band's seventh album, Detonate, was released on September 28, 2018, again on their own label. Howi Spangler described this album as "the closest I've come to a diary. These songs are me dealing with the passing of my Dad in 2016 and my Mom in 1996 as a kid, nearly wanting to quit music, the struggle of having a family and being away all the time..."

The band released a two-song singles sample called Sounds of Summer '19 on August 23, 2019, which featured "California King" and "Dark Sunglasses". These two tracks are also on the 4-song EP, Fighter, that was released on Valentine's Day. The EP also included the single "Renegade", featuring Ted Bowne of Passafire.

=== Message to the World (2020) ===
The band's eighth studio album, Message to the World, was released on June 5, 2020, during the height of the COVID-19 pandemic. Top tracks are "Social Drinker" and "Renegade" featuring Ted Bowne from Passafire, as well as the self-titled single.

On August 21, 2020, the single "I'll Be Ok" was released with Howi Spangler on acoustic guitar. Wanting to "shed light on depression and help people find the resources they need to cope", he explained, "I wrote this song when I was feeling really down one night...Nothing felt right. It was hard to be happy in that moment. So I wrote about it."

In January 2021, Ballyhoo! was featured as one of the reggae/punk artists on The House That Bradley Built, a charity compilation honoring Sublime's lead singer Bradley Nowell, helping musicians with substance abuse. They covered Sublime's song "S.T.P." Also, the band was featured on Collie Buddz' second riddim album, Cali Roots Riddim 2021 with their single, "The Come Up".

On December 24, 2021, Ballyhoo released their fourth EP, titled Planet Sad Boi, on Right Coast Records. It's a 4-song EP that features the single "Beachside Baby" and includes a cover of The Eagles' song "Please Come Home For Christmas".

On August 9, 2022, Ballyhoo! digitally released a live album, Live at Toad's Place, that was recorded at Toad's Place in New Haven, Connecticut on December 29, 2019. It featured 42 minutes of 11 live tracks.

=== Shellshock (2023) ===
Ballyhoo! recorded their ninth studio album, Shellshock, which was released on Ineffable Records on August 25, 2023. The first single was released on June 2, titled "Clip My Wings". The 14-track album features reggae rock artists, The Elovaters, HIRIE, Iya Terra, Kyle Smith and Tropidelic, as well as their home state buddies, Bumpin Uglies.

Ballyhoo! was one of the many featured reggae rock artists/bands on Crossed Heart Clothing presents Pop Punk Goes Reggae, Vol. 1, which was produced by frontman Nathan Aurora of Iya Terra. The 16-track album was released on September 15, 2023, by Ineffable Records. The band covered "I'd Do Anything" by Simple Plan.

== Tours and other works ==
Tour highlights include: 311 Pow Wow Festival in 2011, the 311 Caribbean Cruise in 2012 and 2013, The Bamboozle Festival in 2012, the entire Vans Warped Tour in 2012, and the California Roots Music and Arts Festival in 2013.

After releasing Pineapple Grenade, Ballyhoo! co-headlined the Summer Sickness tour in 2013 alongside Authority Zero and special guests Versus the World.

In 2015, Ballyhoo! joined a tour with Reel Big Fish and Less Than Jake.

Ballyhoo! performed the entire Vans Warped Tour in 2016.

In 2018, Ballyhoo! joined a tour with Reel Big Fish once again, this time to promote their new album Detonate.

In 2019, Ballyhoo! joined Rebelution and Collie Buddz on the Good Vibes summer tour.

In 2021, Ballyhoo! got back to touring in the spring with their first tour since the COVID-19 pandemic. It started out on the east coast with Tropidelic and was followed by a summer tour of the Midwest, including Tropidelic's Everwild Festival in Ohio. Starting on September 26, they headlined a fall tour with The Expendables called "The ExpendaHoo! 2021 Tour", which included Tunnel Vision as the opening band. Ballyhoo! even collaborated with The Expendables on their 2011 single "Walk Away", creating a remixed version with both Howie Spangler and Geoff Weers on vocals. Ballyhoo also covered The Expendables 2007 song, "Down Down Down".

=== In popular culture ===
Ballyhoo!'s music has appeared in numerous surf/skate videos and compilation albums, including Forever Free: A Tribute to Sublime, which featured a cover of "40 Oz. to Freedom". Ballyhoo! songs also appeared in the feature films Beach Kings and Road Trip: Beer Pong.

== Lineup ==
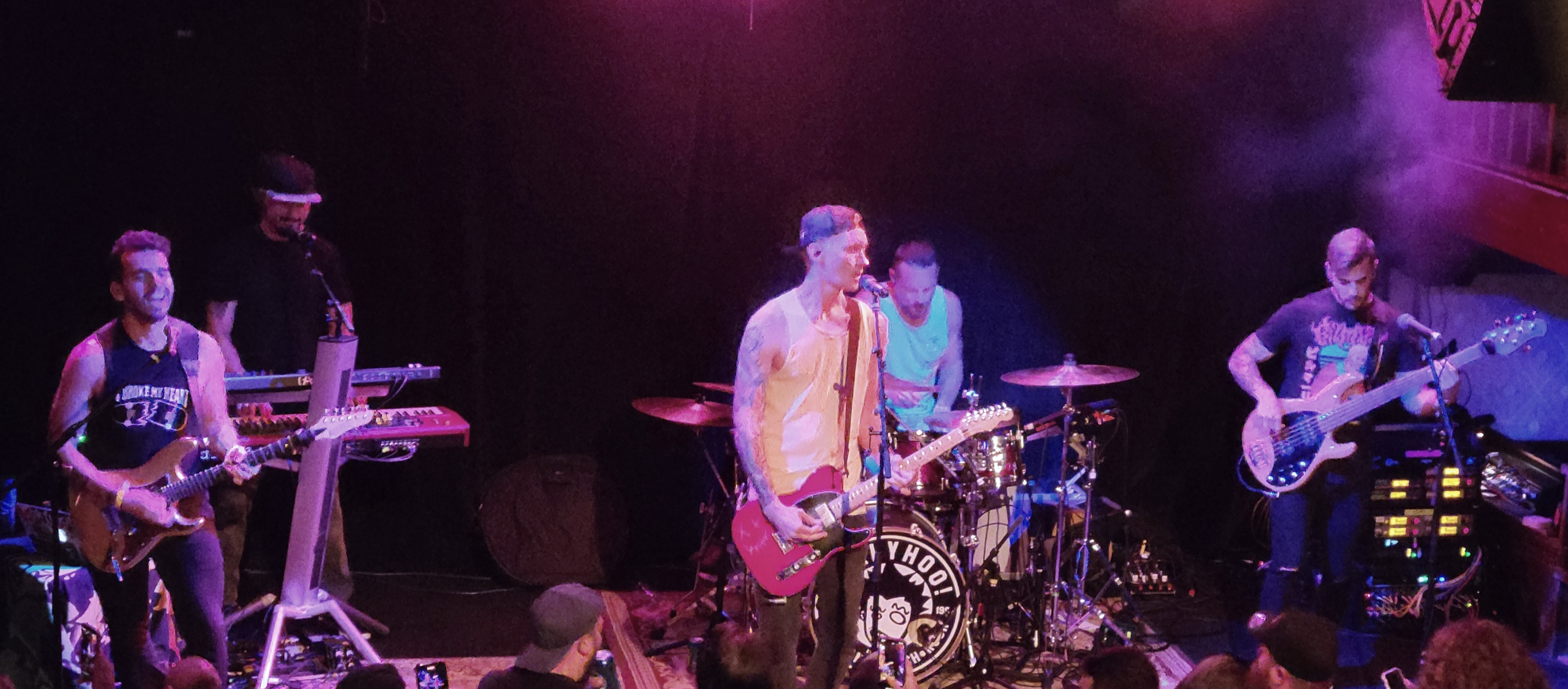
Ballyhoo! performed at Bird & Betty's in Beach Haven, NJ on June 12, 2021.

=== Current members ===
- Howi Spangler – lead vocals, guitar (1995–present)
- Donald Spangler – drums (1995–present)
- Scott Vandrey – keyboards, programming, vocal harmonies (2000–present)
- Nick Lucera – bass (2014–present)

=== Former members ===
- J.R. Gregory – bass (2004–2014)
- Cassius King (UNKSTA) – bass (1997–2003)
- Josh Farley – bass (1995–1997)
- Sebastian Tenorio-Vallejo – guitar, vocals (2020–2024)

== Discography ==
=== Studio albums ===
Ballyhoo! Chart History
| Year | Album | Label | Billboard peak |
|---|---|---|---|
| 2000 | 365-Day Weekend | Hooligan Records | — |
| 2006 | Do It For The Money! | Hooligan Records | — |
| 2009 | Cheers! | Surfdog Records | — |
| 2011 | Daydreams | LAW Records | — |
| 2013 | Pineapple Grenade | Right Coast Records | 189 |
| 2017 | Girls. | Right Coast Records | — |
| 2018 | Detonate | Right Coast Records | — |
| 2020 | Message to the World | Right Coast Records | — |
| 2023 | Shellshock | Ineffable Records | — |
| 2025 | SELF EMPLOYED | Right Coast Records | — |
| 2026 | Do It For The Money! - STILL DOIN' IT $TWENTY (DELUXE) | Right Coast Records | — |

=== Extended play (EPs)/Live albums ===
| Year | Album | Label | Billboard peak |
|---|---|---|---|
| 2004 | The Green (EP) | Hooligan Records | — |
| 2012 | Medium Rare: A Collection of Tasty Cuts | N/A | — |
| 2014 | The Cool Down, Vol.1 (EP) | Right Coast Records | — |
| 2020 | Fighter (EP) | Right Coast Records | — |
| 2021 | Planet Sad Boi (EP) | Right Coast Records | — |
| 2022 | Live at Toad's Place | Right Coast Records | — |
| 2025 | Close to Me | Right Coast Records | — |

=== Singles ===
| Title | Release date | Album |
|---|---|---|
| "Cali Girl" | 2006 | Do It For The Money! |
| "Cervesa" | 2006 | Do It For The Money! |
| "Bad Credit" | 2006 | Do It For The Money! |
| "I lately Notice" | 2006 | Do It For The Money! |
| "The Struggle" | 2008 | Cheers! |
| "Somewhere Tropical" | 2008 | Cheers! |
| "Saw Her Standing" | 2008 | Cheers! |
| "Alcohol Looks Beautiful Tonight" | 2008 | Cheers! |
| "The Friend Zone" | 2008 | Cheers! |
| "Paper Dolls" | 2008 | Cheers! |
| "Close To Me" | 2008 | Cheers! |
| "The Front Porch" | 2010 | (Single) |
| "Walk Away" | 2011 | Daydreams |
| "Say I'm Wrong" | 2011 | Daydreams |
| "Antisocial" | 2011 | Daydreams |
| "Last Night" | 2011 | Daydreams |
| "Evil Penguin" | 2011 | Daydreams |
| "Diamonds" | 2011 | Daydreams |
| "If You Gotta Go" | 2011 | Daydreams |
| "Sandcastles" | 2011 | Daydreams |
| "Kingston Town" (Lord Creator/UB40 Cover) | 2012 | (Single) |
| "Marijuana Laws" | 2013 | (Single) |
| "Beautiful Day (Halo)" | 2013 | Pineapple Grenade |
| "No Good" | 2013 | Pineapple Grenade |
| "Love Letters" | 2013 | Pineapple Grenade |
| "Fast Times" | 2015 | (Single) |
| "Blaze This Weed" | 2017 | Girls. |
| "One In A Million" | 2017 | Girls. |
| "Mixtape" | 2017 | Girls. |
| "She Wants Love" | 2017 | Girls. |
| "I Don't Wanna Go" | 2018 | Detonate |
| "Maryland Summer" | 2018 | Detonate |
| "This Chick is Wack" (feat. Eric Rachmany of Rebelution & Reel Big Fish) | 2018 | (Single) |
| "Armatage Shanks" (Green Day cover) | 2019 | (Single) |
| "Message To The World" | 2020 | Message To The World |
| "Social Drinker" | 2020 | Message To The World |
| "Fighter" | 2020 | Message To The World |
| "California King" | 2020 | Message To The World |
| "Dark Sunglasses" | 2020 | Message To The World |
| "Renegade" (feat. Ted Bowne of Passafire) | 2020 | Message To The World |
| "S.T.P." (Sublime cover) | January 15, 2021 | The House That Bradley Built (Single) |
| "I'll Be OK" | August 21, 2020 | (Single) |
| "The Come Up" (feat. Collie Buddz & Johnny Cosmic) | May 8, 2021 | Cali Roots Riddim 2021 (Single) |
| "Middle Finger" | June 11, 2021 | (Single) |
| "Walk Away" (feat. The Expendables) | July 9, 2021 | The ExpendaHoo! 2021 Tour |
| "Down Down Down" (The Expendables cover) | July 30, 2021 | The ExpendaHoo! 2021 Tour |
| "Social Drinker" (feat. The Expendables) | August 20, 2021 | The ExpendaHoo! 2021 Tour |
| "Please Come Home For Christmas" | December 24, 2021 | Planet Sad Boi EP |
| "Beachside Baby" | December 24, 2021 | Planet Sad Boi EP |
| "The Front Porch" (feat. Kash'd Out) | June 17, 2022 | (Single) |
| "Dammit!" (Blink-182 cover) | September 29, 2022 | (Single) |
| "Sleepin' on the Couch" (feat. The Elovaters) | February 17, 2023 | Shellshock |
| "Clip My Wings" | June 2, 2023 | Shellshock |
| "Drunk Texter" (feat. HIRIE) | June 30, 2023 | Shellshock |
| "Under The Sun" (feat. Tropidelic) | August 25, 2023 | Shellshock |
| "Shellshock" (feat. Iya Terra) | August 25, 2023 | Shellshock |
| "I'd Do Anything" (Simple Plan Reggae Cover) | September 15, 2023 | Pop Punk Goes Reggae, Vol. 1 (Single) |
| "Four Days" | February 16, 2024 | SELF EMPLOYED |
| "Love Letters (Sad Boi Mix) | March 1, 2024 | SELF EMPLOYED |
| "Meaningful" | February 26, 2025 | Close to Me (EP) / SELF EMPLOYED |
| "SWIM' | May 23, 2025 | Close to Me (EP) / SELF EMPLOYED |
| "ICARUS" (feat. Saxl Rose) | July 30, 2025 | Close to Me (EP) / SELF EMPLOYED |
| "Close to Me" | August 29, 2025 | Close to Me (EP) / SELF EMPLOYED |
| "Johnny Quest Thinks We're Sellouts" (feat. Pepper) | Septemeber 19, 2025 | (Single) |

=== Compilation appearances ===
- Sense Boardwear: Poetry In Motion, Vol. 5 (2008), The Pier Magazine / 2 tracks: ("Dead By Tomorrow", "Scarlet Blue")
- Sense Boardwear: Amplified – An Acoustic Collective, Vol. 6 (2010), The Pier Magazine / 2 tracks: ("Love Letters", "Mad Love")
