= Jul Big Green =

American singer

- Born: Julien Raymond Huntley; March 25, 1990 (age 36); Queens, New York
- Genres: Pop, hip hop, indie rock, singer-songwriter, pop rock
- Occupations: Rapper, singer, songwriter, multi-instrumentalist, dj, record producer, actor
- Instruments: Vocals, guitar, piano
- Years active: 2007–present
- Website: julbiggreen.com

Julien Raymond Huntley (born March 25, 1990), known professionally as Jul Big Green, is an American singer, musician, songwriter, actor and audio producer.

== Early life and education ==
Jul is from Cleveland, Ohio. Growing up in a musical family led him to develop a passion for the art at a young age. This passion would later drive him to receiving a Bachelor of Arts degree in music from the University of Akron graduating in 2013.

== Career ==
He start his solo and group projects under the name Jul Big Green. Jul released his first full-length album All Things in May 2015.

Jul's name is in part a nod to his style of always wearing green in public. He has performed as a solo artist or with his full band at many locations around Cleveland and has also done several tours touching Florida, Michigan, and New York. He has also been a guest performer on Cleveland news stations such as Fox 8 News.

== Musical style ==
He performs in diverse styles that range from pop to hip-hop and jazz acoustics.
