= Stick Figure =

American reggae and dub band

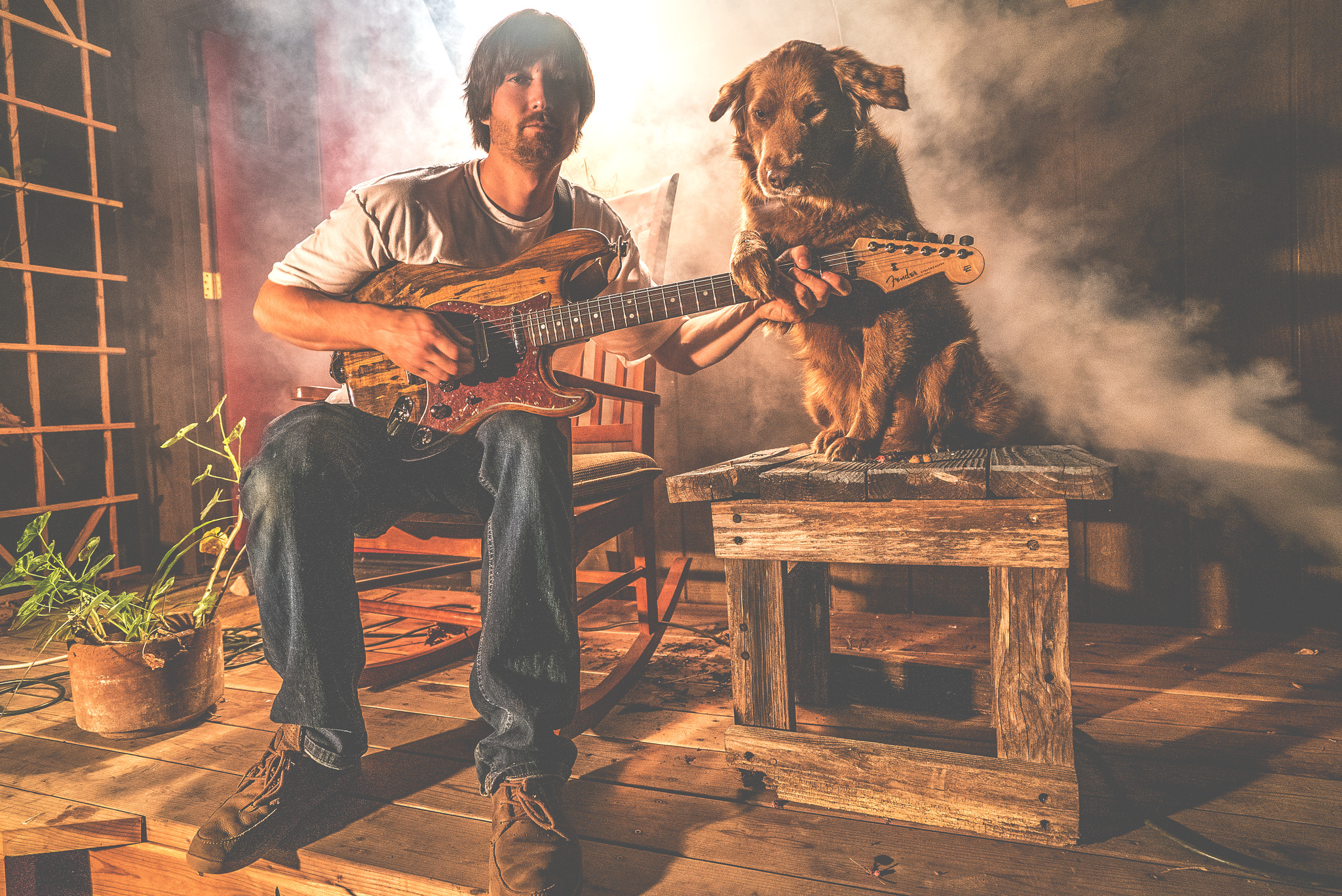
- Frontman Scott Woodruff and Cocoa the Tour Dog, May 2016

Background information
- Origin: Duxbury, Massachusetts, U.S. San Diego, California
- Genres: Roots reggae; dub
- Years active: 2005–present
- Label: Ruffwood Records
- Members: Scott Woodruff; KBong; Kevin Offitzer; Tommy Suliman; Johnny Cosmic; Will Phillips
- Past members: Brendan Dane (Alific); Eric Emerson; Brad Pineau; Todd Smith
- Website: stickfigure.com

Stick Figure is an American reggae band founded in 2005 by frontman and multi-instrumentalist Scott Woodruff. Woodruff writes, records, produces and performs nearly all of the band's music which has been featured on grammy award winning projects and a number of film/tv placements. Recognized by Forbes and Billboard as the top-selling living reggae artist by total consumption worldwide, Stick Figure has earned gold album certification and surpassed billions of streams over eight full-length studio albums. The live band consists of Woodruff, keyboardist Kevin Bong (KBong), drummer Kevin Offitzer, bassist Tommy Suliman, guitarist, keyboardist, and guitarist/backup vocalist Johnny Cosmic and percussionist Will Phillips. Collectively the touring band has performed at major festivals including Coachella and in 2025 was named a top summer tour by Pollstar.

== History ==
=== Early career ===
Stick Figure was founded in 2005 as a one-man band by songwriter and producer Scott Woodruff. Woodruff, originally from his hometown of Duxbury, Massachusetts, began playing instruments at the age of 9, and was primarily drawn to reggae. His style of layering tracks to create songs was particularly inspired by Keller Williams who utilized a looping method to create music.

Woodruff began writing and producing music in 2005, incorporating roots reggae with dub, a subgenre of reggae. As a freshman in college, he began submitting instrumental tracks to the Sublime archive website and then adopted the moniker "Stick Figure".

=== Early releases ===
On December 11, 2007, Woodruff released his first album The Sound of My Addiction under Ruffwood Records (a pun on his last name). Scott Woodruff started Ruffwood Records and it has released all of his albums to date. The Sound of My Addiction established Stick Figure's style of self-production. Woodruff created the album by "recording instruments individually, [and] layering tracks on top of one another in unison", a style he used to create subsequent albums.

On January 16, 2008, Scott Woodruff released his sophomore album, Burnin' Ocean under Ruffwood Records. The album was one of the Top 10 Best Reggae Albums in 2008 on the iTunes charts; notable tracks include "Burnin' Ocean", "So Good" and "We Get High".

=== Smoke Stack and Reprise Sessions (2009–2011) ===
In the summer of 2009, Woodruff moved to the San Diego area and shortly after released his album, Smoke Stack which followed the same recording style of the previous two albums where he individually recorded and layered each track creating a song. Songs on the album include "Livin' It", "Hawaii Song" and "Vibes Alive".

Smoke Stack was well-received and peaked at No. 8 on the Billboard Reggae Albums chart and No. 17 on the Heatseekers Album Chart. Next, he released, The Reprise Sessions on August 3, 2010, under Ruffwood Records. The rare album was an extension to Smoke Stack. Two of the songs are Your Way" and "Dead End Street".

=== Burial Ground (2012) ===
On June 12, 2012, two years after releasing Reprise Sessions, Woodruff released the fourth Stick Figure studio album, Burial Ground. All 14 tracks were written and produced by Woodruff, one of which features vocals by reggae singer Half Pint, and one features vocals from Woodruff's close friend, T.J. O'Neill. Woodruff co-wrote five of the tracks with O'Neill; the two traveled abroad together in Indonesia, Australia, Fiji, Thailand, and New Zealand for quite a while, beginning in 2010 and finding mutual inspiration for songwriting. The album was No. 1 on the iTunes and Billboard Reggae charts, and reached #17 on the Heatseekers Albums chart in the United States.

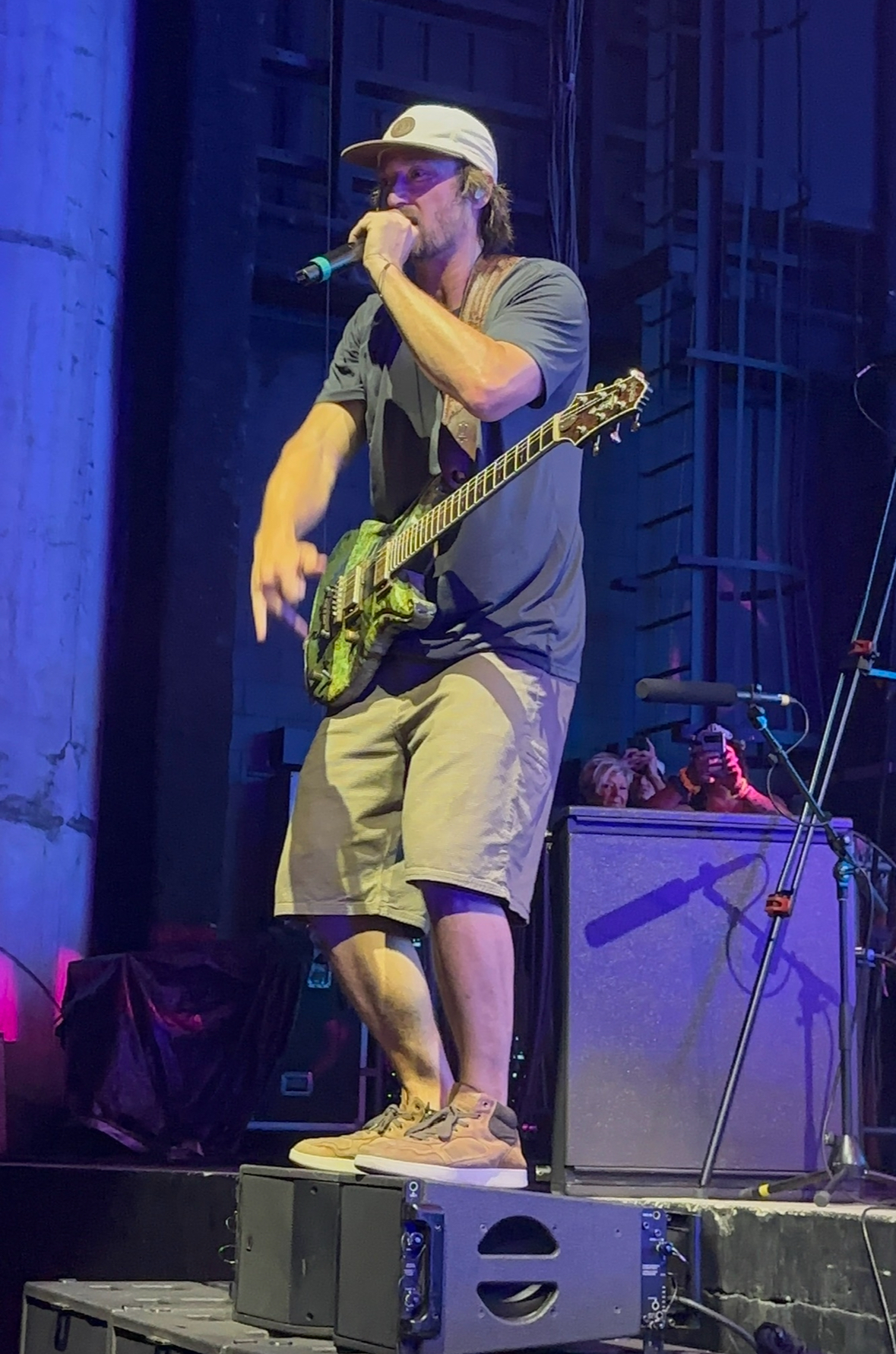
Scott Woodruff performs with Stick Figure in Tampa, Florida in 2025.

Burial Ground was met with a positive critical response, with a number of critics pointing out the mixing of upbeat reggae and dub. According to The Reggae Review, "Original, bass-heavy, one drop beats are consistent throughout the album, as are the subtle nuances...and sometimes not so subtle nuances... of dub. Stick Figure's digits remain firmly on the pulse of roots reggae/dub music." The Pier said, "the album represents a new milestone in Stick Figure's musical growth and innovative abilities, with more layering, instrumental transcendence, and lyrical complexity [than their previous albums]."

=== Live touring band ===
After the release of Burial Ground in 2012, Woodruff organized a live band, adding members Kevin Bong (KBong) on keyboards, Todd Smith on drums, and Tommy Suliman on bass. The quartet toured with reggae band The Green starting in September 2012 and included eighteen stops along the East Coast of the United States.

In August 2012, Stick Figure embarked on their first headlining tour with stops in major cities including Boston(With The Jackson Wetherbee Band), Austin, Denver and Chicago with multiple sold-out shows. Also in 2012, they went on three national tours alongside reggae bands Passafire, John Brown's Body, and Tribal Seeds. In 2014, they headlined their first national tour, with numerous sold-out shows including a performance at West Hollywood, California's renowned Roxy Theater which sold out two weeks before the show date.

Within two years of forming a live band, Stick Figure toured with other major acts including Rebelution, Slightly Stoopid, Collie Buddz, a reggae band from Bermuda; Passafire, Tribal Seeds and The Expendables. They performed at various internationally recognized festivals including Reggae on the River, Cali Roots Festival, Life is Beautiful, Closer to the Sun, Levitate, and Bonnaroo, amongst others.

=== Move to Northern California ===
In 2015, Scott Woodruff moved from San Diego to a home in the woods in the outskirts of Santa Cruz. Immediately after that, he built Ruffwood Studios where he recorded the Stick Figure album, Set in Stone. He derived inspiration for Set in Stone from the redwood forest just outside of his studio.

=== Set in Stone and touring (2015–2018) ===
On November 13, 2015, Woodruff released his fifth studio album, Set in Stone. The album went to No. 1 on the Billboard Reggae Albums chart, and was on the chart for 78 weeks. It appeared on six Billboard charts overall, including No. 101 on the Billboard 200, No. 24 on Digital Albums, No. 1 on Heatseekers Albums, No. 7 on Independent Albums, and No. 65 on the Top Album Sales chart. Woodruff produced it in the same way he produced the five previous albums. The 14-track album has collaborations with Eric Rachmany of Rebelution, Slightly Stoopid, KBong, and Collie Buddz.

External videos
- "Fire on the Horizon," Stick Figure (Official Music Video) - November 10, 2015

After the album's release, in January 2016, the live band embarked on a U.S. tour with the Southern California reggae band Fortunate Youth. John Gray (a.k.a. Johnny Cosmic), a multi-instrumentalist, made his debut appearance as a member of the Stick Figure live band on tour playing keyboards, singing backup vocals, and playing guitar. With the success and popularity of Set In Stone, Stick Figure released their first instrumental album, Set In Stone: Instrumentals on April 1, 2016.

=== World on Fire and Fire & Stone (2019–2021) ===
Stick Figure collaborated with long-time friend and musician T.J. O'Neill on his first solo single, the Jimmy Buffett cover "A Pirate Looks at 40" also featuring KBong and Johnny Cosmic. The music video was shot live on location at a resort in Mexico with thousands of fans surrounding the band while performing. On August 30, 2019, Stick Figure released their sixth studio album, World on Fire. Like previous projects, the album was written, recorded, and produced by Scott Woodruff, playing every instrument and recording each vocal himself. However, the album was created at Stick Figure-owned Great Stone Studios in Oakland, California, the former home of punk band Green Day. With assistance from associate producer Johnny Cosmic (Stick Figure live guitarist, keys, and back up vocals), the album included guest appearances from Slightly Stoopid, Citizen Cope, and O'Neill; it has 15 songs.

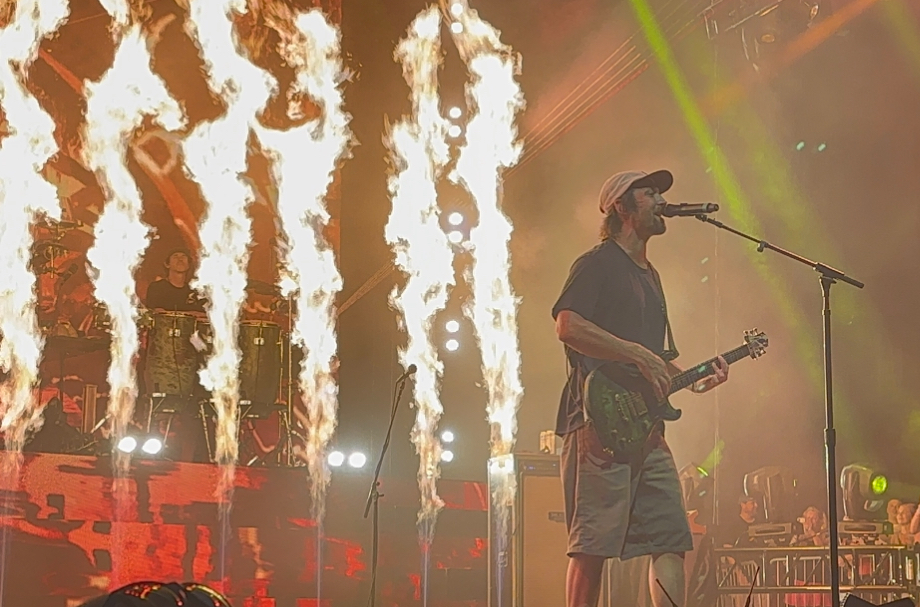
Scott Woodruff performs with Stick Figure in Tampa, Florida in 2025.

The album debuted on a number of Billboard charts. It was No. 34 on the Top 200 chart, held the top spot on the Billboard Reggae Albums chart, No. 4 on the Digital Albums chart, No. 5 New Albums, No. 6 Current Albums, and No. 2 on the Independent Albums chart. The highest selling debut week album of the year, World on Fire sold more copies in week one (over 10,000) than the previous year's winner (Sting and Shaggy's "44/876"). The album remained at #1 on the Billboard Reggae Albums chart for four consecutive weeks.

The album received considerable radio play. SiriusXM's The Joint, SiriusXM's No Shoes Radio, and SiriusXM's Margaritaville played it. Stick Figure was the first artist to be named the face of Cali Reggae Countdown on Pandora Radio. In 2020, Stick Figure announced their first ever headline amphitheater tour. The tour was to feature support from Collie Buddz, Iya Terra, and The Movement as well as visits to 19 cities nationwide. However, the tour was canceled due to the COVID-19 pandemic. On March 18, 2021, Stick Figure released their second instrumental album, World on Fire: Instrumentals.

Stick Figure teamed up with UK producer and dub music master Prince Fatty to remix some of the band's favorite songs from albums, Set in Stone and World on Fire. The full remix album titled after the albums, Fire & Stone was released on April 30, 2021. A single from the album, "Weary Eyes (Prince Fatty Presents)" premiered on April 9. The new tracks have all new instrumentation.

=== Wisdom (2022) ===
After three years in the making, Stick Figure recorded their seventh full-length studio album titled, Wisdom, which was released on September 9, 2022. The 14-track album was once again recorded and mixed at Woodruff's Great Stone Studio with TJ O'Neill assisting in the writing process. Woodruff added a full brass section with Liam Robertson on saxophone, Quinn Carson on trombone and Glenn Holdaway playing trumpet on some tracks. With cover art by Juan Manuel Orozco, the album features Barrington Levy from Jamaica, Collie Buddz, and Slightly Stoopid on two tracks.

Woodruff said that the album's name, "Wisdom is a journey and a search for what matters in life—a search for meaning, purpose, place and belonging. Wisdom is a code to live by where we can accept that it is okay to start over, to make mistakes, to love, and to feel pain. It is a reminder to focus on the little things that bring joy and know that all of it is a part of our individual story." It debuted at No. 51 on the Billboard 200 chart, No. 1 on the Billboard Reggae Albums chart and No. 6 on the Billboard Independent Albums chart with 13,900 units sold from traditional sales and streaming during its first week of release making it the fourth consecutive Stick Figure album to debut at No. 1 on Billboard's Reggae Albums chart. By September 23, the album's total sales, including pre-released tracks, totaled over 41,000 units. Wisdom was the first album to debut No. 1 On the Reggae chart In over two years.

Stick Figure was one of the many featured reggae rock artists on Crossed Heart Clothing presents Pop Punk Goes Reggae, Vol. 1, which was produced by lead singer Nathan Aurora of Iya Terra. It was released on September 15, 2023, by Ineffable Records and has 16 songs. The band put a reggae spin on their cover of "Boulevard of Broken Dreams" by Green Day.

On April 24, 2024, Stick Figure collaborated with surf-rock artist Jack Johnson with a single titled, "Home". The proceeds from "Home" benefit the Kōkua Hawai'i Foundation, a non-profit organization which supports environmental education in the communities and schools of Hawaii.

In 2025, Stick Figure played 15 dates across the United States as the headliner for the Island Holiday Summer Tour. They were supported by Stephen Marley and The Hip Abduction on the highly celebrated tour. The tour was met by fantastic reviews from fans in the Stick Figure Family.

== Other projects ==
Stick Figure’s song, "Burial Ground" was featured on MLB The Show 16 MVP Edition video game. Stick Figure has collaborated with Wachusett Brewing Company to promote the new Cocoanut IPA, which is distributed in New England.

== Live lineup ==
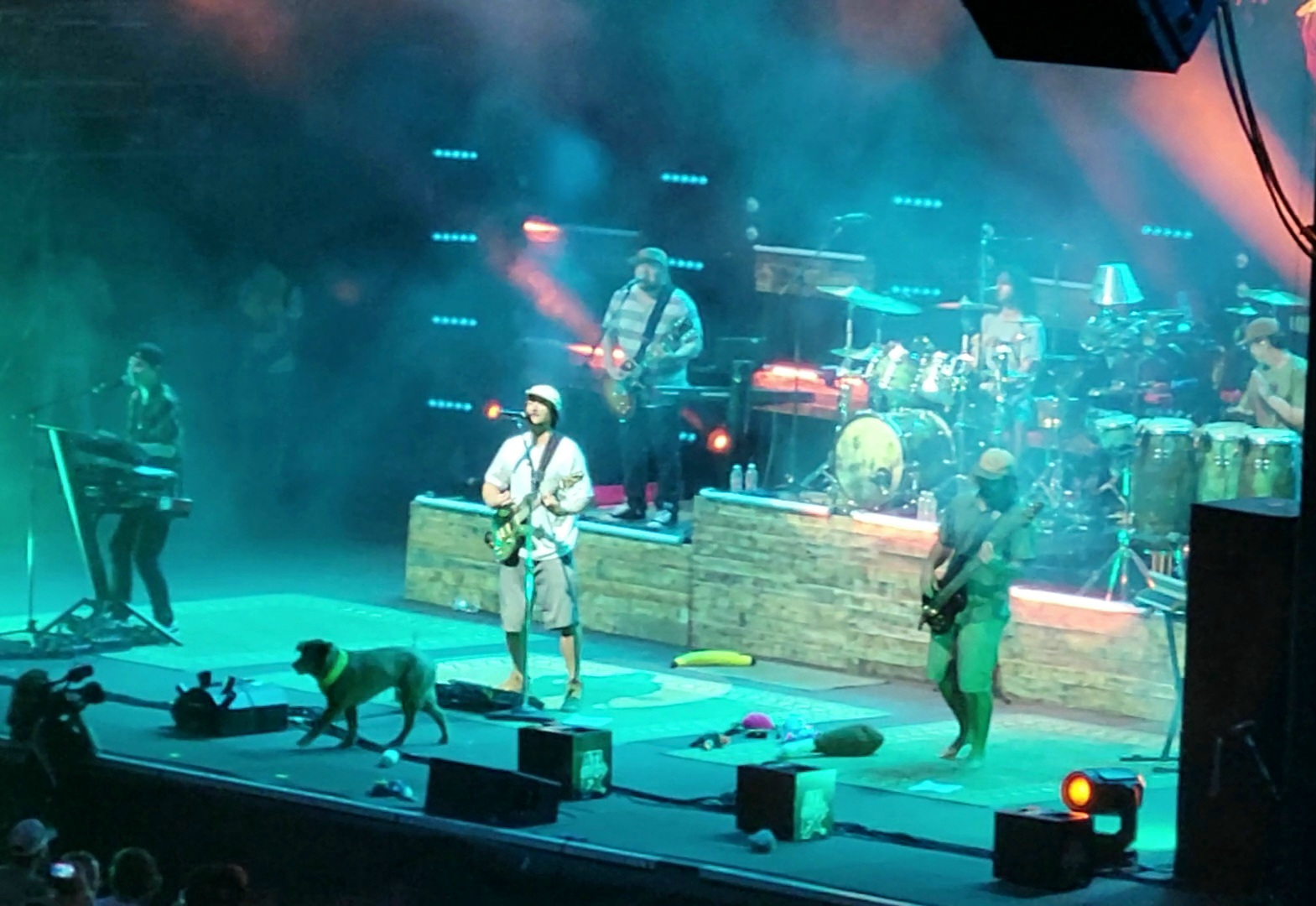
Stick Figure with Cocoa the Tour Dog performing at the Westville Music Bowl in New Haven, Connecticut, July 2023

=== Members ===
- Scott Woodruff – lead vocals, lead guitar (2006–present)
- KBong – keyboards (2012–present)
- Kevin Offitzer – drums (2012–present)
- Tommy Suliman – bass (2012–present)
- Johnny Cosmic – keyboard, backup vocals, guitar (2016–present)
- Will Phillips – percussion (2022–present)
- Cocoa the Tour Dog – Scott's Australian Shepherd/band mascot (2012–2025, died 2026)

== Discography ==
=== Studio albums ===
List of albums by Stick Figure
Title	Details	Peak chart positions	
Title	Details	US	US Reggae
The Sound of My Addiction	Released: April 6, 2006; Label: Ruffwood	—	—
Burning Ocean	Released: January 16, 2008; Label: Ruffwood	—	—
Smoke Stack	Released: November 3, 2009; Label: Ruffwood	—	8
The Reprise Sessions	Released: August 3, 2010; Label: Ruffwood	—	—
Burial Ground	Released: June 15, 2012; Label: Ruffwood	—	1
Set in Stone	Released: November 13, 2015; Label: Ruffwood	101	1
World on Fire	Released: August 30, 2019; Label: Ruffwood	34	1
Wisdom	Released: September 9, 2022; Label: Ruffwood	51	1

=== Other releases ===
Year	Title	Release details
2016	Set In Stone: Instrumentals	Ruffwood Records (April 1, 2016)
2017	Above the Storm	Ruffwood Records (October 20, 2017)
2018	World en Fuego	Ruffwood Records (June 8, 2018)
2021	World on Fire: Instrumentals	Ruffwood Records (March 18, 2021)
2021	Prince Fatty Presents Fire & Stone; (remix album)	Ruffwood Records (April 30, 2021)
2025	Who Set the World on Fire; (with Ganja White Night)	SubCarbon Records (January 17, 2025)
2026	Run Run River (Angels Above Me); (with David Guetta and Alok)	B1 Recordings GmbH (June 2, 2026)

=== Compilation appearances ===
- Sense Boardwear: Amplified – An Acoustic Collective, Vol. 6 (2008), The Pier Magazine / 1 track: ("Trouble Up There")
