= Laurie McLay =

Autism spectrum disorder researcher in New Zealand

Academic background
- Education: University of Canterbury, University of Canterbury
- Theses: Acquisition, generalisation and retention of object names in 4 year old children : a comparison of child-led and adult-led learning interactions (2003); A study of teaching strategies that facilitate stimulus generalisation in children with autism (2011)
- Doctoral advisor: John Church, Dean Sutherland
- Other advisor: John Church

Laura-Lee Kathleen McLay is a New Zealand academic, and is a full professor at the University of Canterbury, specialising in research on sleep disorders, communication and behavioural assessments in autistic children.

== Academic career ==
McLay completed a master's degree titled Acquisition, generalisation and retention of object names in 4 year old children: a comparison of child-led and adult-led learning interactions at the University of Canterbury, followed by a PhD titled A study of teaching strategies that facilitate stimulus generalisation in children with autism in 2011. McLay then joined the faculty of the University of Canterbury, where she was promoted to full professor in 2022.

McLay leads the Waiora Tamariki Programme, which is a nationwide research and clinical delivery service that aims to "promote the health and wellbeing of children on the autism spectrum and their whānau". In 2017, McLay was one of thirteen researchers to receive an emerging researcher first grant from the Health Research Council, to research effective treatments for sleep disorders in autistic children. According to McLay, up to 83% of autistic children experience some form of sleep disturbance, but there are few evidence-based treatments available. McLay has since been part of a research team that received a one-year HRC grant to establish the research priorities of end-users in the autism community. She also researches Functional Behavioural Assessments, toilet training and communication systems for autistic children.

== Selected works ==
- Sigafoos, Jeff; Lancioni, Giulio Eugenio; O'Reilly, Mark F.; et al. (2013). "Teaching two boys with autism spectrum disorders to request the continuation of toy play using an iPad®-based speech-generating device". Research in Autism Spectrum Disorders. 7 (8): 923–930. doi:10.1016/j.rasd.2013.04.002. Wikidata Q124795840.
- Llyween Couper; Larah van der Meer; Martina C M Schäfer; Emma McKenzie; McLay, Laura Lee Kathleen; O'Reilly, Mark F.; Lancioni, Giulio Eugenio; Peter B Marschik; Sigafoos, Jeff; Dean Sutherland (2014). "Comparing acquisition of and preference for manual signs, picture exchange, and speech-generating devices in nine children with autism spectrum disorder". Developmental Neurorehabilitation. 17 (2): 99–109. doi:10.3109/17518423.2013.870244. PMID 24392652. Wikidata Q50344986.
- Donna Achmadi; Sigafoos, Jeff; Larah van der Meer; Dean Sutherland; Lancioni, Giulio Eugenio; O'Reilly, Mark F.; Flaviu Hodis; Green, Vanessa; McLay, Laura Lee Kathleen; Peter B. Marschik (2014). "Acquisition, Preference, and Follow-up Data on the Use of Three AAC Options by Four Boys with Developmental Disability/Delay" (PDF). Journal of Developmental and Physical Disabilities. 26 (5): 565–583. doi:10.1007/s10882-014-9379-z. Wikidata Q124795839.
- McLay, Laura Lee Kathleen; Dean Sutherland; John Church; Gaye Tyler-Merrick (2013). "The formation of equivalence classes in individuals with autism spectrum disorder: A review of the literature". Research in Autism Spectrum Disorders. 7 (2): 418–431. doi:10.1016/j.rasd.2012.11.002. Wikidata Q124795836.
- McLay, Laura Lee Kathleen; Larah van der Meer; Martina C. M. Schäfer; Llyween Couper; Emma McKenzie; O'Reilly, Mark F.; Lancioni, Giulio Eugenio; Peter B. Marschik; Green, Vanessa; Sigafoos, Jeff; Dean Sutherland (2014). "Comparing Acquisition, Generalization, Maintenance, and Preference Across Three AAC Options in Four Children with Autism Spectrum Disorder" (PDF). Journal of Developmental and Physical Disabilities. 27 (3): 323–339. doi:10.1007/s10882-014-9417-x. Wikidata Q124795835.
- Hien Vu; Nicholas Bowden; Gibb, Sheree; et al. (2024). "Mortality risk among Autistic children and young people: A nationwide birth cohort study". Autism. doi:10.1177/13623613231224015. Wikidata Q124795789.
- McLay, Laura Lee Kathleen; Dean Sutherland; Wendy Machalicek; Jeff Sigafoos (2020). "Systematic Review of Telehealth Interventions for the Treatment of Sleep Problems in Children and Adolescents". Journal of Behavioral Education. 29 (2): 222–245. doi:10.1007/s10864-020-09364-8. Wikidata Q124795795.
