= Rugby Sound Festival =

Italian music festival

Rugby Sound Festival, Legnano
- Genre: Rock, folk, pop, hip hop, indie, rap, electronic dance music
- Dates: Consecutive 10 days between late June and early July (currently)
- Locations: Visconti Castle (Legnano, Italy)
- Coordinates: 45.5848°N 8.9265°E
- Years active: 2000–2019, 2022–present
- Founders: Pietro Dallù
- Capacity: 8,000
- Organizer: Parabiago Rugby 1948 and Shining Production
- Website: https://www.rugbysound.it

The Rugby Sound Festival is an annual music and cultural festival held in the city of Legnano, in the Metropolitan City of Milan, in the Lombardy region of Italy. Founded in the 1980s, the festival has evolved to host diverse musical genres from both local and international performers.

The festival's lineup includes a range of musical genres, including rock, folk, pop, hip hop, indie, rap and electronic dance music. The festival is now managed by Shining Production, which combines musical and street food offerings.

== History ==
The Rugby Sound Festival was founded in the early 1980s. It was created as the Parabiago Rugby team's end-of-year party. The festival became accessible to the public from 2000 and has become one of the most important festivals in northern Italy. In 2012, the festival organizers decided that the increasing popularity required professional management and started a collaboration with Shining Production. The organizers began collaborating with external professionals from diverse fields including communication, sponsorship, advertising, and street food. This allowed the festival to gain attendance and popularity. The Rugby Sound Festival held in 2023 had the largest number of visitors in the festival's history and became known as the "record" edition. The event was attended by 70,000 individuals and tickets sold out in 12 days, establishing it as one of the most popular festivals in Italy.

Chi non avanza, retrocede.

— Rugby Sound founder Pietro Dalu's motivations when starting the Rugby Sound project

=== The Parabiago Rugby Team ===
The Parabiago Rugby team was created in 1948 by Pietro Dallù with Nino Cataldi as the first president. In two years the team was promoted to the first division (Serie A). Over 200 members of the Parabiago Rugby team, including men and women, subsequently formed a group named "Squadra dei 200" to promote sport and teamwork, and continues to actively contribute to the Festival by participating in security.

== Festival Locations ==
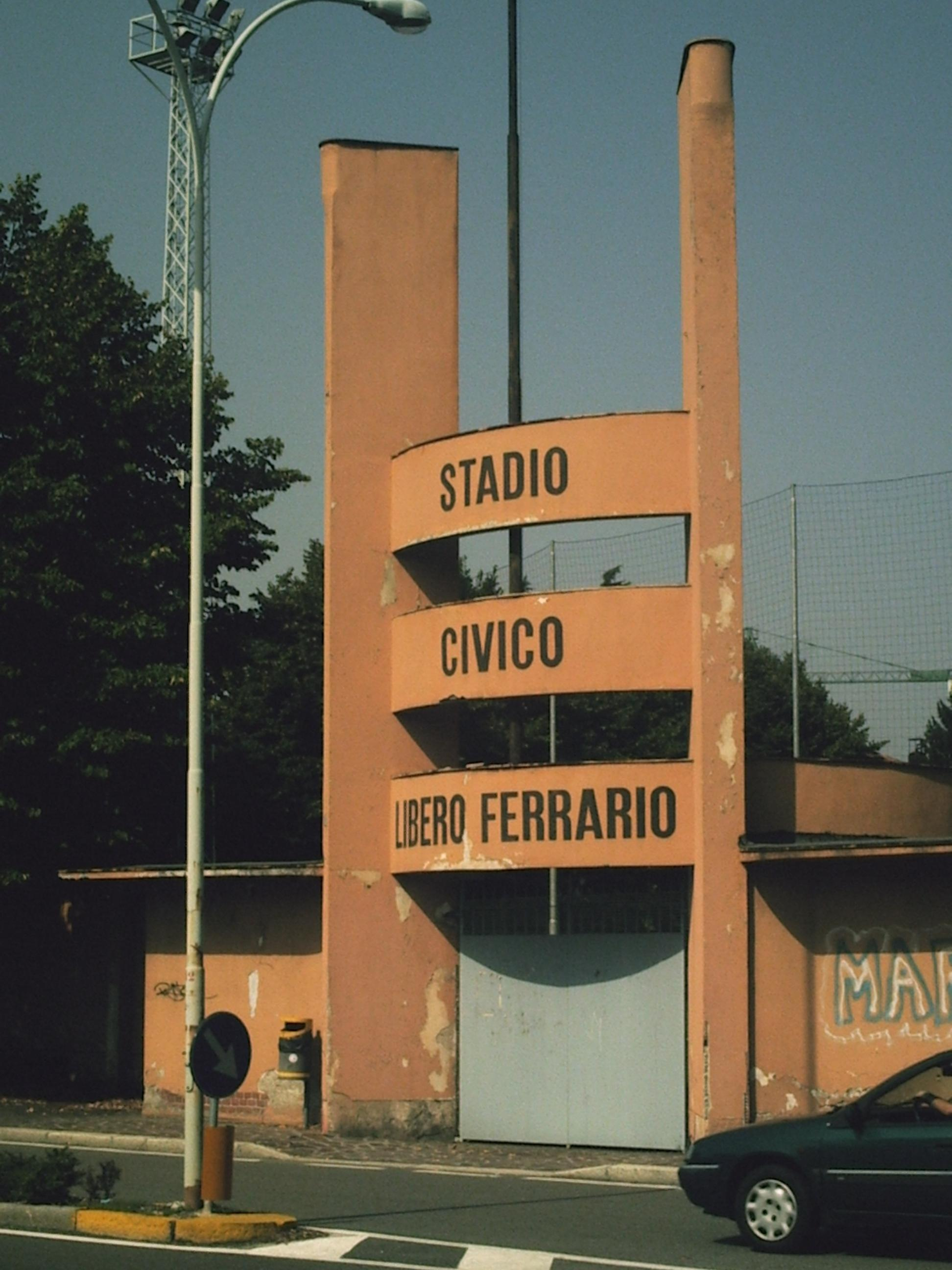
Libero Ferrario Stadium, Parabiago (Mi)

=== Libero Ferrario Stadium ===
From 2000 to 2007 the Rugby Sound Festival was held at the Libero Ferrario Stadium, a football stadium located at Viale Guglielmo Marconi in the city of Parabiago. The stadium was originally opened in 1933 in honor of the cyclist Libero Ferrario and hosts Parabiago's home games, with a capacity of 700 seats.

=== "Venegoni – Marazzini" sports court ===
From 2008 to 2016, the Festival was held at the Parabiago Rugby team's sports center, "Vengoni – Marazzini" Sports Court in Via Carso in the city of Parabiago. The centre has been home to Rugby Parabiago since 1985 when the club relocated from its previous headquarters, the "Libero Ferrario" Sports Centre. It is a conceptual modern construction that has been regularly updated and improved. It has spread across an area of approximately 38,000 m^{2} to the southwest of the municipal jurisdiction.

=== Visconti Castle ===
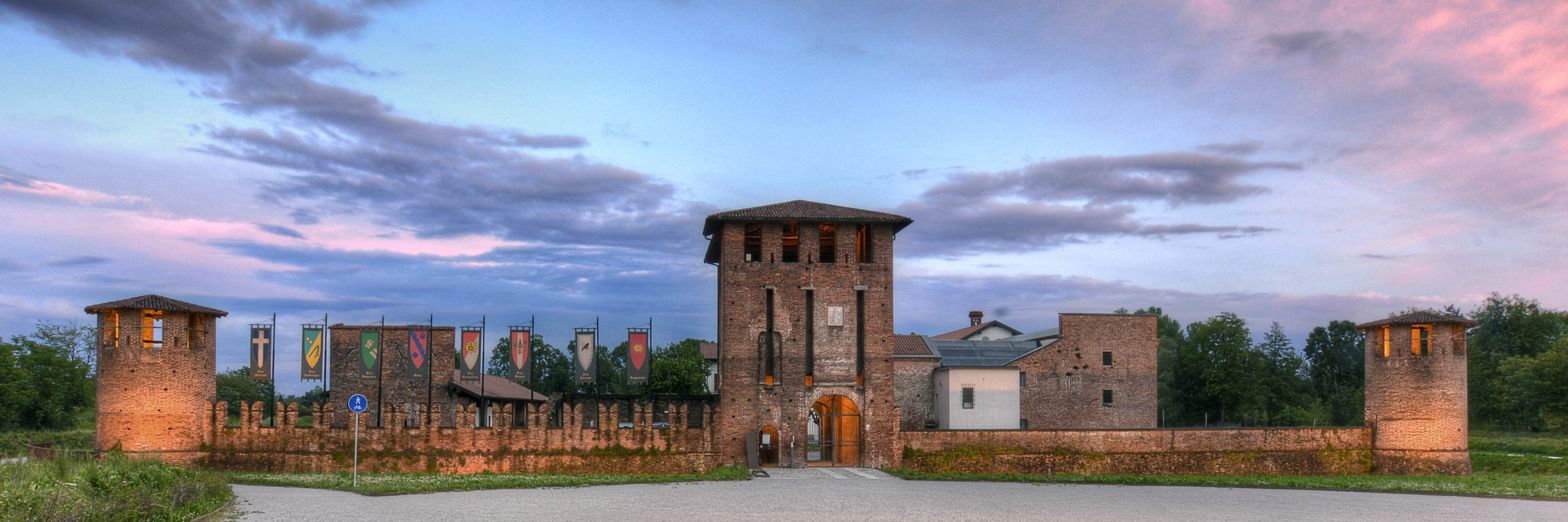
Visconti Castle, Legnano (Mi)

From 2017 – 2023 the Festival has been held at the Visconti Castle (Legnano) (also known as San Giorgio Castle) in Lombardy. The castle is located on raised ground to the south of Legnano (part of the Metropolitan City of Milan) and is situated on a small island created by the Olona river. The precise location of the 'Rugby Sound Festival' is P.zza della Concordia, 1, 20025 Legnano (MI).

== Organization ==
Since 2016 the Rugby Sound Festival has been organised with the collaboration of Shining Production, the Comune di Legnano and Parabiago Rugby, who provide volunteer support.

International and local artists are contacted in October and continue through November, with a concentration on international artists and groups until December. Italian artists are sourced immediately after the Sanremo Music Festival, which puts a hold on activities until February. The final names of the various artists are finalised between February and April. In response to increasing numbers the organisers developed a VIP experience and enhanced checkout procedures to shorten wait times.

Festival security organisation involves the Polizia di Stato, Municipal Police, Carabinieri, Guardia di Finanza, Protezione Civile, Italian Red Cross and Agenzia di Sicurezza. It is supported with the aid of a surveillance system and emergency preparations. Security management for the 2023 Festival was the responsibility of Deputy Commissioner Ilenia Romano.

The Festival organization includes maintaining rules aimed at discouraging inappropriate behavior, alcohol abuse and violence.

== Street Food Parade ==
The Street Food Parade is organized by "Associazione Culturale Le Officine", a cultural organization that operates mainly in the provinces of Varese and Milan. The event consists of numerous food trucks coming from all over Italy, with particular regard to traditional Italian street foods. The event was held in Legnano for the first time in October 2016, and more than 30,000 people attended. Because of the unexpected popularity of the event, many food trucks ran out of food.

The success of the 2016 event led to cooperation between Shining Production and "Associazione Culturale Le Officine" to combine the music festival and food parade to realize "an event inside the event" In 2019 a portion of the island was assigned to the Street Food Parade for the duration of the festival. This allowed the visitors of the festival to try the different street foods while attending the musical events of the festival. The initiative was continued for successive editions of the festival.

2019	2022
Hamburgers; Fried Gnocchi; Abruzzese Skewers; American Barbecue; Fried Vegetables; Puglian Friselle; Brazilian Picanha and Grilled Meat; Hot Dogs; Teriyaki Chicken Sandwich; Japanese Takoyaki; Modenese Tigelle; Salsiccia and Friarielli; Sicilian Arancini; Grilled Vegetables; Fried, Grilled, and Smoked Fish; Piadina Romagnola; Seadas with Pecorino and Honey; Fish & Chips; Sangria	Meatballs; Steaks and Fillet Steak; Modenese Tigelle; Asian Food; Gourmet Hamburger; Panzerotti; Abruzzese Skewers; Burrito, Tacos and Nachos; Pizza; Japanese Takoyaki; Hot Dogs; Hamburgers with typical Roman ingredients; Gourmet Bruschetta; Octopus Sandwiches; Waffles, Pancakes, and Crepes; Various Street Desserts

== 2023 Festival "Record" Edition ==
The 2023 Rugby Sound Festival at Legnano Castle island ran from 29 June to 10 July and included concerts, performances and free DJ sets at the end of the night. It had a record attendance of 70,000 people, with a total of six sold-out performances, two of which sold out three weeks before the start. The event achieved The festival was structured as follows:

- 29 June: performance by Planet Funk, an Italian electronic band, followed by the Motel Connection
- 30 June: performance by a pop and punk band Finley, followed by a music party called Teenage Dream. This date is one of the two that sold-out three weeks before the start of the Festival
- 1 July: the lineup featured the dance-pop band Eiffel 65, followed by a dance-themed music party named Zarro Night.
- 2 July: the singer Cristina D'Avena along with the band Gem boy
- 3 July: performance of a young rapper known as Rondodasosa, followed by 4 other rappers: Neima Ezza, Medy, Neza, and Artie5five
- 4 July: started with hip-hop band Articolo 31, composed of singer J-Ax and DJ Jad, followed by dance, pop, and hip-hop DJ Wlady
- 6 July: Sfera Ebbasta, the rapper with the highest number of streams (on Spotify) in Italy
- 7 July: two rappers performed, Salmo followed by Nitro
- 8 July: pop band Boomdabash
- 9 July: two rappers from Naples, Luchè followed by Geolier
- 10 July: comedian Andrea Pucci – the second of the two shows that reached full capacity three weeks before the start of the festival

== Festival summary by year ==
Edition	Year	Dates	Location	Headliners and prices	Attendance
13th	2012	26 June – 1 July	Sport Court "Venegoni – Marazzini" – Rugby Parabiago	26 June – Battle of the Bands 2012 – Free entry; 27 June – Egidio Brugali & The Jamaican Bus + Rootical Foundation + Legend (Bob Marley Cover Band) – Free entry; 28 June – Maddog + Rumatera + Linea 77 – Free entry; 29 June – Vito War Dj Set + Giuliano Palma & The Bluebeaters – €5 after 9:00pm; 30 June – Nena & The SuperYeas + Planet Funk – €5 after 9:00pm; 1 July – 667 + Clairvoyants and Dennis Stratton (Iron Maiden Cover Band) – Free entry	
14th	2013	23–30 June	Sport Court "Venegoni – Marazzini" – Rugby Parabiago	23 June – Rock This Town, Rock n Roll festival – Tony Tuono and the Black Roosters + Backseat Boogie + The Good Fellas – Free entry; 24 June – Goodbye To Gravity – The Bastard Sons Of Dioniso – Free entry; 25 June – Battle Of The Bands 2013 – Free entry; 26 June – War Machine AC/DC Tribute Band – Blackin Head Metallica Tribute Band – Free entry; 27 June – Egidio Brugali unplugged + Vito War + Serious Thing Dj Set+ Mellow Mood + Alborosie – €10; 28 June: Merdonald's + Maddog + Punkreas – €5; 29 June – Junior Sprea + Good Vibe Styla + Sud Sound System – €5; 30 June – Club Dogo – €5	
15th	2014	11–20 July	Sport Court "Venegoni – Marazzini" – Rugby Parabiago	11 July – Dj Gabry Ponte + Dj Set Borotalko (Valtellina cuisine) – €10; 12 July – Giuliano Palma + Monaci del Surf (Hungary cuisine) – Free entry; 13 July – Rock'n'Roll Kamikaze + Izzy + the Catastrophics (USA cuisine) – Free entry; 14 July – 'Bottle of Band' presented by Chiara Karse di Radio Deejay (Rome cuisine) – Free entry; 15 July – Ki-Mani Marley + Raphael + Eazy Skankers + Serious Things (Austria cuisine) – Free entry; 16 July – Tre Allegri Ragazzi Morti + Figli di Madre Ignota (Sicily cuisine) – Free entry; 17 July – Salmo (Spanish cuisine) – €10; 18 July – Bunny Wailer (Mexico cuisine) – €10; 19 July – Motel Connection + Boosta (Milan cuisine) – €10; 20 July – Cristina D'Avena + Gem Boy – €10	
16th	2015	26 June – 5 July	Sport Court "Venegoni – Marazzini" – Rugby Parabiago	26 June – Caparezza – €10; 27 June – Sud Sound System + Train to roots + The Black Beat Movement – €5; 28 June – Lollipop + 50s festival + Olly Riva & the SoulRocket + Messer Chups – Free entry; 29 June – Battle of the bands – Free entry; 30 June – Folkstone + Uncle Bard & The Dirty Bastards (Celtic Night) – Free entry; 1 July – Rumatera + L'invasione degli omini verdi – Free entry; 2 July – The Fratellis + i Monaci del Surf – €10; 3 July – Punkreas + Vallanzaska + PAY – €5; 4 July – Mellow Mood + Dub inc – Free entry; 5 July – Ruggero de I Timidi + Manolo Strimpelli Nait Orkestra – Free entry	
17th	2016	24 June – 3 July	Sport Court "Venegoni – Marazzini" – Rugby Parabiago	24 June – Lacuna Coil – Free entry; 25 June – Bandabardò – Free entry; 26 June – Salmo – €10; 27 June – Four Fighters – Free entry; 28 June – Shandon + Gli Statuto – Free entry; 29 June – Derozer Punk Rock – Free entry; 30 June – Alborosie + Mahout + Vito War – €10; 1 July – Davide Van De Sfroos – €10; 2 July – Gogol Bordello -€10; 3 July – IRON MAIS – €10	
18th	2017	30 June – 9 July	Island of Visconti Castle (Legnano)	30 June – Elio e Le Storie tese – €15; 1 July – Planet Funk – €5; 2 July – Paddy's la Festa Irlandese – Free entry; 3 July – I Legnanesi – Free entry; 4 July – Boomdabash – Free entry; 5 July – Tre Allegri Ragazzi Morti – Free entry; 6 July – The Darkness – €15; 7 July – J-Ax & Fedez – €30; 8 July – Litfiba – €20; 9 July – Holi – The Festival of Colors – Free entry	40,000
19th	2018	29 June – 8 July	Island of Visconti Castle (Legnano)	29 June – Ziggy Marley – €10; 30 June – Fabri Fibra + Gemitaiz; 1 July – Max Pezzali – Nek – Francesco Renga – €23; 2 July – Saor Patrol – Free entry; 3 July – Lacuna Coil + Rezophonic – Free entry; 4 July – Alborosie + Mellow Mood – €11,65; 5 July – Sfera Ebbasta – €28,75; 6 July – The Hives + I Ministri – €17,25; 7 July – Deejay Time – Free entry; 8 July – Negrita – €23	45,000
20th	2019	28 June – 7 July	Island of Visconti Castle (Legnano)	28 June – The Bloody Beetroots + Nitro + Destroy The Disco – €5; 29 June – Subsonica – €20; 30 June – Max Gazzè – €20; 1 July – Gazzelle + Coma Cose – €25; 2 July – Omar Pedrini + Alex Uhlmann – Free entry; 3 July – J-Ax & Articolo 31 – Mr. Rain – €32.80; 4 July – Folkstone + Luf – Free entry; 5 July – Salmo – €32.80; 6 July – Zarro Night with Il Pagante – free entry; 7 July – Skunk Anansie + The Sweet Life Society – €35	50,000
–	2020	cancelled due to the COVID-19 pandemic			
–	2021	cancelled due to the COVID-19 pandemic			
21st	2022	30 June – 10 July	Island of Visconti Castle (Legnano)	30 June – Lacuna Coil + Moonlight Haze – €1 (free entry for children under 10); 1 July – Sud Sound System + Vito War + Train To Roots – €1 (free entry for children under 10); 2 July – Deejay Time – €12; 3 July – Litfiba – €34.50 (free entry for children under 10); 4 July – Paky + Shiva + Rhove (opening Nerissima Serpe) – €21.74 (free entry for children under 10); 5 July – Gemitaiz – €30.44 (free entry for children under 10); 6 July – Punkreas + The Bastard Sons Of Dioniso – €1 (free entry for children under 10); 7 July – Irama – €33.91 (free entry for children under 10); 8 July – Subsonica + Bluvertigo – €30 (free entry for children under 10); 9 July – Zarro Night with Il Pagante – €12; 10 July – Fabri Fibra – €33.91 (free entry for children under 10)	55,000
22nd	2023	29 June – 10 July	Island of Visconti Castle (Legnano)	29 June – A/V Show, with Planet Funk and Motel Connection; 30 June – Finley + Teenage Dream; 1 July – Eiffel 65 + Zarro Night; 2 July – Cristina D'Avena + Gem Boy; 3 July – Rondodasosa + Neima Ezza + Medy + Neza + Artie 5ive; 4 July – Articolo 31 + Wlady; 5 July – Voglio tornare negli anni '90; 6 July – Sfera Ebbasta; 7 July – Salmo + Nitro; 8 July – Boomdabash; 9 July – Luchè + Geolier; 10 July – Andrea Pucci	70,000

== See also ==
- Music festival
- List of music festivals in Italy
- Palio di Legnano
- Legnano, Music
- Summer Festival
- Coachella (festival)
- Voodoo Music + Arts Experience
- Musilac Music Festival
- Skopje Summer Festival
- Summer Festival, Albania
