= Tribal Seeds =

American reggae band

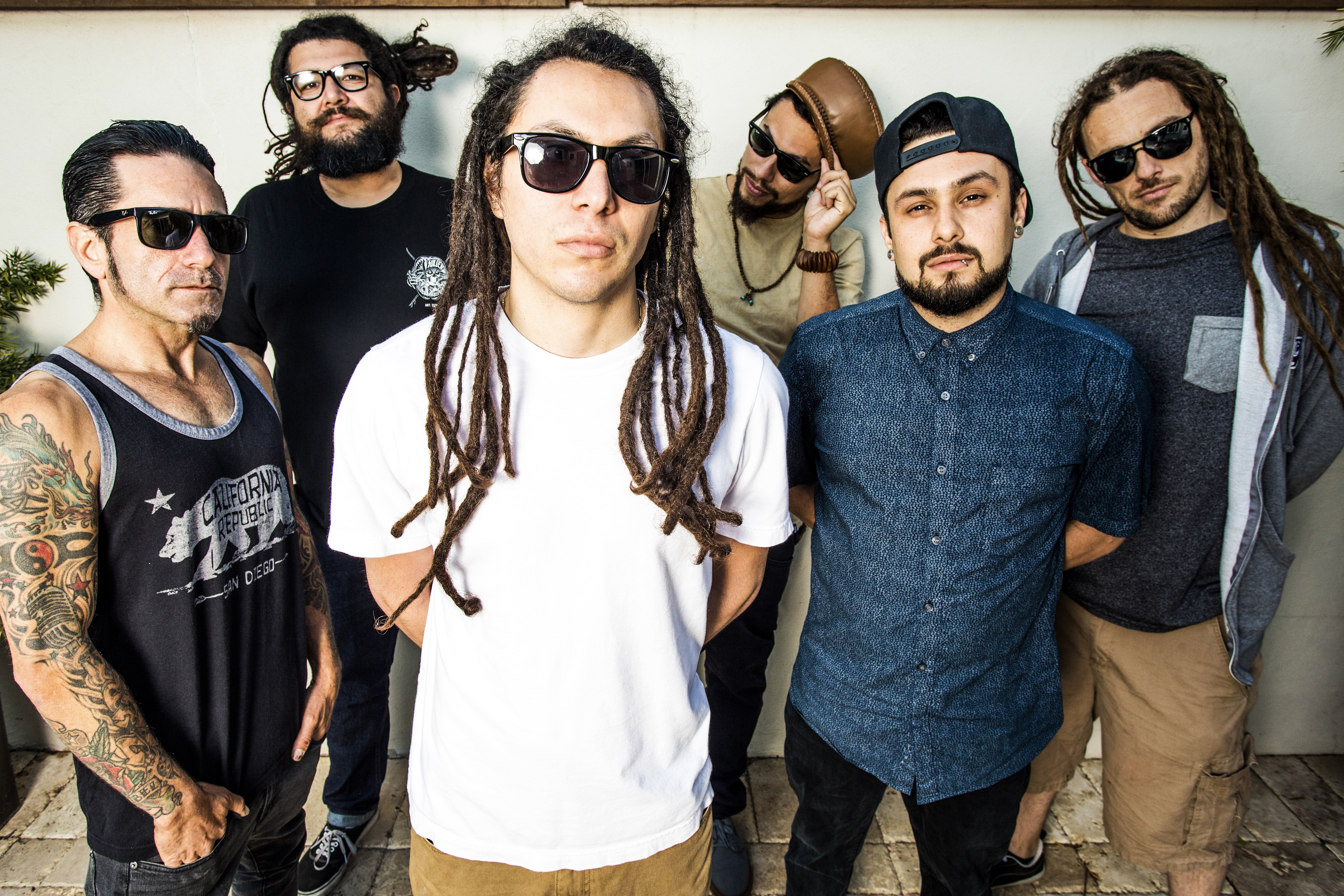
- Tribal Seeds in 2017

Background information
- Origin: San Diego, California, United States
- Genres: Reggae, reggae rock
- Years active: 2005–Present
- Labels: Tribal Seeds Music iSeed Industries LLC
- Members: Steven Jacobo; Tony-Ray Jacobo; Victor Navarro; Ryan Gonzo; Luis Castillo; Jamey "Zeb" Dekofsky
- Past members: Daniel Lopilato; John Wegener; Tony Navarro; Carlos Verdugo; Marc Muñoz; E.N. Young; Joe Rodriguez
- Website: www.tribalseeds.net

Tribal Seeds is an American reggae band based in San Diego that was formed in 2005 by the Jacobo brothers, singer Steven Rene and producer Tony-Ray.

== Biography ==
=== Formation (2003–2005) ===
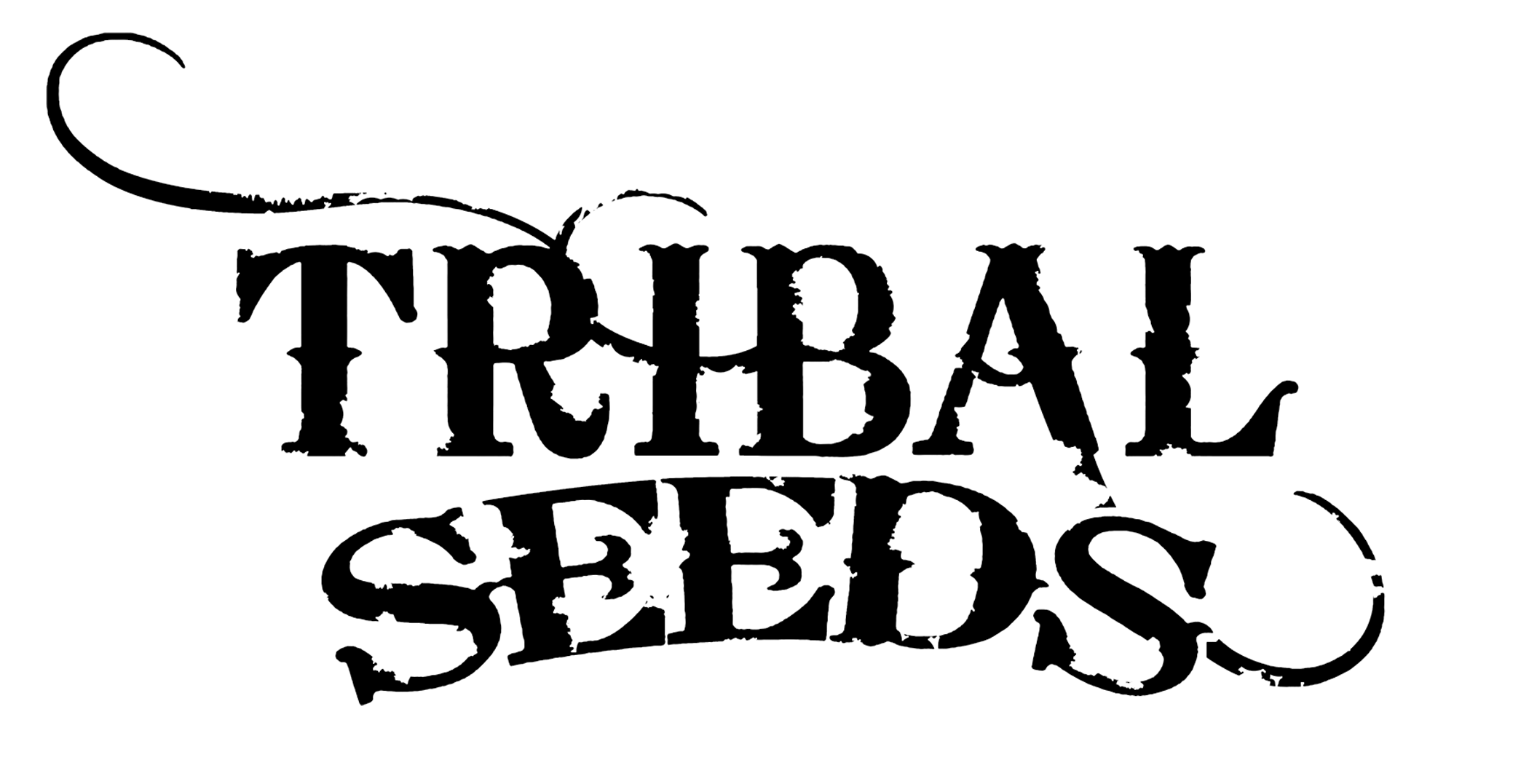
Logo

From San Diego, California, award-winning reggae group Tribal Seeds have become known for their spiritually driven, refreshing rock vibe they have infused with the roots style of reggae music.

Originally started by two brothers, Steven Rene Jacobo (lyrics, vocals, guitar) and Tony-Ray Jacobo (keyboardist, producer) in 2005 (though the idea came about in 2003), Tribal Seeds went through a lot of different members over the years.

=== Youth Rebellion and Self-titled album (2005–2008) ===
With the original lineup of the Jacobo brothers, along with brothers Victor and Antonio "Tony" Navarro on guitar and percussion, they added another guitarist Mark Muñoz, keyboardist John Wegener and drummer Carlos Verdugo.

The band issued their debut album, Youth Rebellion in 2005. The album was the first of many to be released on the group's own label.

Tribal Seeds self-titled album, their second, was released on their own label on January 16, 2008. iTunes named this album "Best Of" in the Reggae genre. Their debut album helped garner them the "Best World Music" title at the San Diego Music Awards in 2008.

=== The Harvest and Soundwaves EP (2009–2011) ===
Their third album, The Harvest, followed on May 26, 2009, once again, on their own label. It featured 14 original songs and debuted at the #5 spot on the Billboard Top Reggae Albums Charts, as well as earning iTunes "Best Of" category just like their debut album.

On July 19, 2011, Tribal Seeds released their first EP titled, Soundwaves, which peaked at #2 on the Billboard Top Reggae Albums chart.

=== Representing (2013–2015) ===
In the beginning of 2013, the band parted ways with guitarists Marc Muñoz, percussionist Tony Navarro, and bassist John Wegener. They added their friend, producer, keyboardist and lyricist E.N. Young who previously produced the band's Soundwaves EP.

On May 13, 2014, Tribal Seeds released their fourth studio album, Representing. It debuted at #1 on the Billboard Reggae Charts (114 Top Billboard 200), as well as the iTunes and Amazon Top Reggae charts. Representing contains 12 original recordings featuring Don Carlos, Mykal Rose, Kyle McDonald of Slightly Stoopid, Vaughn Benjamin of Midnite, New Kingston, Maad T-Ray (Tribal Seeds' producer), and guitarist, Gonzo.

=== Major lineup change (2016) ===
Once again, the band announced another lineup change with the departure of two influential members: Carlos Verdugo and E.N. Young.

Long-time drummer Carlos Verdugo decided to leave the band on good terms and was recruited as the new full-time drummer for Sublime with Rome. The band quickly named Jamey "Zeb”Dekofsky who was most notably the drummer for Barrington Levy and backing band, Detour Posse.

However, E.N. Young didn't leave so quietly. He took to social media to announce his abrupt departure and express his frustration with the Jacobo brothers (owners) and the band's management on how they handled the situation by a "letter of termination" email after asking questions about the band's future. Meanwhile, Steven Rene responded by saying had "nothing bad to say about E.N. but it just didn't work out with him." Jacobo added, that "all the negatively surrounding the topic shouldn't have been made into a scene online."

Tony-Ray Jacobo decided to ditch the keyboard and live performances to solely focus on producing Tribal Seeds' music and albums, so he will remain with the band behind the scenes. He also wanted to focus on his solo career with different musical genres. He goes by the name "Maad T-Ray".

=== Roots Party EP (2017) ===
Tribal Seeds released a second EP titled, Roots Party on December 1, 2017, which debuted at the top of the charts at #1 on Billboard, iTunes, and Amazon Reggae charts. The EP consists of five new tracks including; "Aroma", "Gunsmoke" (featuring Protoje), "Roots Party", "Empress" and "Rude Girl", along with three dub tracks. (The European version of Roots Party EP was released on June 6, 2018. It includes five bonus tracks.)

=== Live album (2020) ===
The band recorded their first live album titled Tribal Seeds Live: The 2020 Sessions, which released on November 20, 2020.

=== Ancient Blood (2024) ===
Tribal Seeds released their fifth studio album, titled Ancient Blood on February 9, 2024. The 17-track album features: Gonzo & Maad T-Ray, Hector Roots Lewis, Hempress Sativa, Hollie Cook, Kabaka Pyramid, The Movement, Romain Virgo, The Elovaters, Twinkle Brothers, as well Spanish singer Chiquis Lozoya.

== Awards and honors ==
Their debut album helped garner them the Best World Music title at the San Diego Music Awards (2008).

Tribal Seeds won Artist of the Year at the San Diego Music Awards in 2017.

== Lineup ==
=== Current band members ===
- Steven Jacobo – Lead Vocals, Guitar (2005–Present)
- Tony-Ray Jacobo ("Maad T-Ray") – Keyboard, Vocals (2005–Present), Producer (2005–Present)
- Victor Navarro – Bass (2005–Present)
- Ryan "Gonzo" Gonzalez – Guitar, Backing Vocals (2013–Present)
- Luis Castillo – Keyboards, Backing Vocals (2017–Present)
- Jamey "Zeb" Dekofsky – Drums (2017–Present)
- Hector Roots Lewis - Guest Vocals (2022–Present)

=== Past band members ===
- Daniel Lopilato – Keyboard (2017–2020)
  (featured on Roots Party EP)
- Marc Muñoz – Guitar (2005–2008)
  (featured on Youth Rebellion, Tribal Seeds)
- John Wegener – Bass (2005–2009)
  (featured on Youth Rebellion, Tribal Seeds, The Harvest)
- Tony "Dready" Navarro – Guitar, Percussion (2005–2014)
  (featured on Youth Rebellion, Tribal Seeds, Soundwaves EP, The Harvest)
- Carlos "C-Los" Verdugo – Drums (2006–2017)
  (featured on Youth Rebellion, Tribal Seeds, The Harvest, Soundwaves EP, Representing)
- E.N. Young – Keyboard, Melodica, Backing Vocals (2013–2017)
  (featured on Representing)
- Joe Rodriguez – Percussion, Keyboard (2013–2017)
  (featured on Representing)

== Discography ==
=== Studio albums ===
Chart History
Year	Album	Label	Billboard peak
2005	Youth Rebellion	Self-released	—
2008	Tribal Seeds	Tribal Seeds Music	—
2009	The Harvest	Tribal Seeds Music	#5
2011	Soundwaves EP	Tribal Seeds Music	#2
2014	Representing	Tribal Seeds Music	#1
2017	Roots Party EP	Tribal Seeds Music	#1
2020	Tribal Seeds Live: The 2020 Sessions	Tribal Seeds Music	—
2024	Ancient Blood	Tribal Seeds Music	TBD

=== Singles ===
Title	Release date	Album
"Dark Angel"	2005	Youth Rebellion
"Beautiful Mysterious"	2005	Youth Rebellion
"Dawn of Time"	2007	Tribal Seeds
"Island Girl"	2007	Tribal Seeds
"The Garden"	2009	The Harvest
"Vampire" (feat. Whiteboy John)	2009	The Harvest
"Love Psalm"	2009	The Harvest
"Come Around"(feat. Whiteboy John)	2009	The Harvest
"Warning"	2009	The Harvest
"Night Raver"	2009	The Harvest
"Stillness of the Night"	2009	The Harvest
"Libertad" (feat. Dready)	2009	The Harvest
"144,000"	2009	The Harvest
"Mad Man"	2009	The Harvest
"Away"	2009	The Harvest
"Herby"	2009	The Harvest
"Soundwaves" (feat. Eric Rachmany of Rebelution)	2011	Soundwaves EP
"In Your Eyes"	2011	Soundwaves EP
"Run The Show"	December 20, 2011	(Single)
"Did Wrong"	March 13, 2012	(Single)
"Run The Dubsteb" (Tha Maad T-Ray ReMIX)	April 20, 2012	(Single)
"Night & Day"	2014 (also released as a single on August 28, 2012)	Representing
"In Your Area" (feat. Kyle McDonald of Slightly Stoopid)	2014	Representing
"Moonlight"	2014	Representing
"Rock the Night" (feat. Maad T-Ray)	2014	Representing
"Blood Clot" (feat. Don Carlos)	2014	Representing
"Ruined"	2014	Representing
"Fill It Up" (feat. Gonzo & New Kingston)	2014	Representing
"Representing" (feat. Vaughn Benjamin of Midnite)	2014	Representing
"Undercover Lover" (feat. Gonzo)	2014	Representing
"Herb Stock" (feat. Mykal Rose)	2014	Representing
"Surrender"	February 12, 2016	(Single)
"Rude Girl"	April 27, 2017	Roots Party EP
"Aroma"	2017	Roots Party EP
"Gunsmoke" (feat. Protoje)	2017	Roots Party EP
"Empress"	2017	Roots Party EP
"Roots Party"	2017	Roots Party EP
"Tempest" (Live)	2020	Live: The 2020 Sessions
"Down Bad Vibes" (Live)	2020	Live: The 2020 Sessions
"Fallen Kings" (Live)	2020	Live: The 2020 Sessions
"Wicked & Riled" (feat. Hempress Sativa)	September 17, 2021	Ancient Blood (Single)
"Dusk Till Dawn" (feat. Hector Roots Lewis)	August 18, 2022	Ancient Blood (Single)
"Tempest"	October 14, 2022	Ancient Blood (Single)
"Breathe Easy" (feat. The Movement)	October 24, 2022	Ancient Blood (Single)
"Mellow Mood" (feat. The Elovaters)	February 9, 2024	Ancient Blood
"Tokyo"	February 9, 2024	Ancient Blood
