= Hinckson =

Hinckson is a surname. Notable people with the surname include:

- Erica Hinckson (fl. from 1997), New Zealand academic
- Jaime Hinckson (born 1988), American pianist and composer
