= Africa United =

Africa United may refer to:

- Africa United (2010 film), a film by Deborah Gardner-Paterson
- Africa United (2005 film), a film by Olaf de Fleur Johannesson
- Africa Unite (band), an Italian reggae band, founded as Africa United in 1981

== See also ==
- Africa Unite (disambiguation)
