= Quartiere Coffee =

Italian reggae band

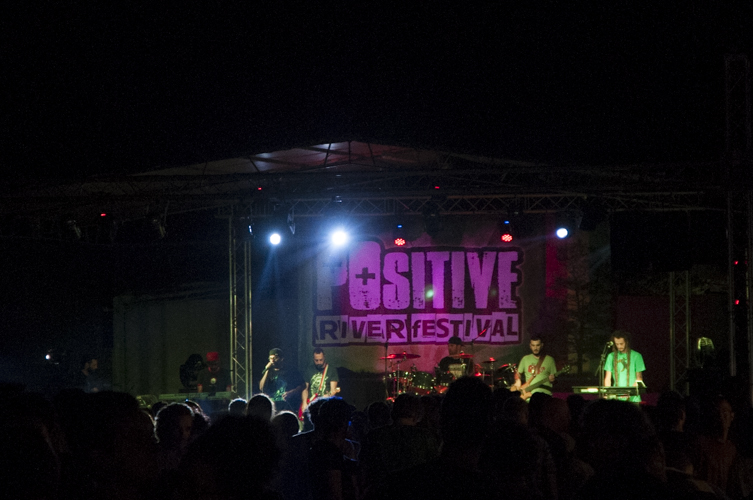
- Quartiere Coffee performing at Positive River Festival in 2013

Background information
- Origin: Grosseto, Italy
- Genres: Reggae; Dancehall reggae
- Years active: 2004–present
- Labels: One Step Records; Red Gold Green Label
- Members: Tommaso "Kg Man" Bai; Filippo "Rootman" Fratangeli; Matteo Varricchio; Marco Vagheggini; Matteo Maggio; Filippo Scandroglio
- Past members: Gianluca Acquilino; Matteo Breschi; Giulio Grillo

Quartiere Coffee is an Italian reggae band from Grosseto, formed in 2004.

== History ==
They debuted in 2008 with the studio album In-A, produced by Ciro "Prince Vibe" Pisanelli, and performed at Rototom Sunsplash on 12 July 2008.

In 2010 they released the single "Sweet Aroma", which became one of the most successful songs of the band. The band won the "Jammin' Contest" of the Heineken Jammin' Festival in July 2010 and they performed as the opening act for Vasco Rossi on 11 July 2011.

Lead guitarist Gianluca Acquilino died on 16 April 2014 at the age of 34 and frontman Kg Man left the band later that year. Keyboardist Filippo "Rootman" Fratangeli became the new leader and vocalist of the band.

In 2016 Quartiere Coffee participated at the Reggaeville's World Reggae Contest, performing at the Ostróda Reggae Festival in Poland. The band ended up second to the Dutch band The Dubbeez. Their fourth album Conscience was released on 5 May 2017.

On 13 November 2020, the band announced the comeback of lead vocalist Kg Man, and the new single "Back in Town" was released on 3 December.

== Discography ==
=== Studio albums ===
- In-A (2008)
- Vibratown (2010)
- Italian Reggae Familia (2013)
- Conscience (2017)
- La mia terra (2024)

=== Singles ===
- "Suffer" (2009)
- "1st Round" (2010)
- "Sweet Aroma" (2010)
- "Italian Reggae Familia" (2013)
- "We Are" (2016)
- "Sometimes" (2016)
- "In Jamaica" (2016)
- "Un viaggio" (2020) with I Matti delle Giuncaie
- "Back in Town" (2020)
- "Love mi vida" (2021)
- "Just One" (2022) feat. Mellow Mood
- "Countdown" (2022)
- "Centro di gravità permanente (2022) feat. Simone Cristicchi
- "La tempesta" (2023)
- "Mr. Propaganda" (2024) feat. Finaz
- "Cultura" (2025) feat. Mama Marjas

== Bibliography ==
- Ten. Dieci anni di musica di una delle reggae band più importanti della penisola. Scarlino: Ouverture Edizioni. 2014.
