= Erica Hinckson =

New Zealand public health researcher

Academic background
- Education: University of California, San Diego, University of Oregon, Auckland University of Technology
- Thesis: Effect of simulated altitude exposure on sea level performance (2004)
- Doctoral advisor: Patria Hume, Will Hopkins

Erica Hinckson is a New Zealand academic, and is a full professor at the Auckland University of Technology (AUT). She is interested in how the built environment affects physical activity, and how to use approaches such as citizen science and participatory research to achieve large-scale change.

== Academic career ==
Hinckson undertook a Bachelor of Science in biochemistry and cell biology at the University of California San Diego, and then studied exercise physiology with a Master of Science from the University of Oregon and a PhD titled Effect of simulated altitude exposure on sea level performance at the Auckland University of Technology. In 1997 Hinckson joined the faculty of the Unitec Institute of Technology, where she lectured in exercise physiology before moving to AUT in 2004, rising to full professor in 2017. As of 2024 she is Head of the School of Sport and Recreation at AUT.

Hinckson's background in exercise science has led her to a greater interest in public health, and how physical activity and sedentary behaviour are influenced by the built environment. Her approaches include evidence-based citizen science and community-based participatory research, and she is interested in issues such as children's active travel to school, how physical activity varies with life stage and built environment, and health equity. Hinckson leads a project within an $8 million MBIE-funded project called Te Hotonga Hapori – Connecting Communities, where researchers are working with Kāinga Ora to investigate how the built environment itself, and being part of a community redevelopment, affects people's wellbeing.

In 2020 Hinckson was elected to a three-year term as president of the International Society of Behavioral Nutrition and Physical Activity, which has around 1000 members from 44 different countries. Hinckson co-chaired the steering committee for the Lancet series on physical activity 2024, which found that Auckland scored below average as a sustainable city. She is on the executive committee of the Global Observatory of Healthy and Sustainable Cities.

== Selected works ==
- Sedentary Behaviour Research Network (2012). "Letter to the editor: standardized use of the terms "sedentary" and "sedentary behaviours"". Applied Physiology, Nutrition, and Metabolism. 37 (3): 540–542. doi:10.1139/h2012-024. PMID 22540258. Wikidata Q61852618.
- Leslie J. McGrath; Will G. Hopkins; Erica A. Hinckson (2015). "Associations of objectively measured built-environment attributes with youth moderate-vigorous physical activity: a systematic review and meta-analysis" (PDF). Sports Medicine. 45 (6): 841–865. doi:10.1007/s40279-015-0301-3. PMID 25618013. Wikidata Q38330963.
- Erica A. Hinckson; Annette Dickinson; Tineke Water; Madeleine Sands; Lara Penman (2013). "Physical activity, dietary habits and overall health in overweight and obese children and youth with intellectual disability or autism". Research in Developmental Disabilities. 34 (4): 1170–1178. doi:10.1016/j.ridd.2012.12.006. PMID 23400004. Wikidata Q39469064.
- Hinckson, Erica; Amy Curtis (2012). "Measuring physical activity in children and youth living with intellectual disabilities: a systematic review". Research in Developmental Disabilities. 34 (1): 72–86. doi:10.1016/j.ridd.2012.07.022. PMID 22940161. Wikidata Q38039776.
- D Van Dyck; Ester Cerin; I De Bourdeaudhuij; et al. (2014). "International study of objectively measured physical activity and sedentary time with body mass index and obesity: IPEN adult study". International Journal of Obesity. 39 (2): 199–207. doi:10.1038/ijo.2014.115. PMC 4282619. PMID 24984753. Wikidata Q34807387.
- Witten, Karen; Blakely, Tony; Nasser Bagheri; Hannah Badland; Vivienne Ivory; Pearce, Jamie Robert; Suzanne Mavoa; Hinckson, Erica; Schofield, Grant (2012). "Neighborhood built environment and transport and leisure physical activity: findings using objective exposure and outcome measures in New Zealand". Environmental Health Perspectives. 120 (7): 971–977. doi:10.1289/ehp.1104584. PMC 3404665. PMID 22456536. Wikidata Q36115411.
- Saeideh Aminian; Erica A. Hinckson (2012). "Examining the validity of the ActivPAL monitor in measuring posture and ambulatory movement in children". International Journal of Behavioral Nutrition and Physical Activity. 9 (1): 119. doi:10.1186/1479-5868-9-119. PMC 3490870. PMID 23031188. Wikidata Q28714232.
