= Mellow Mood (band) =

Italian reggae band

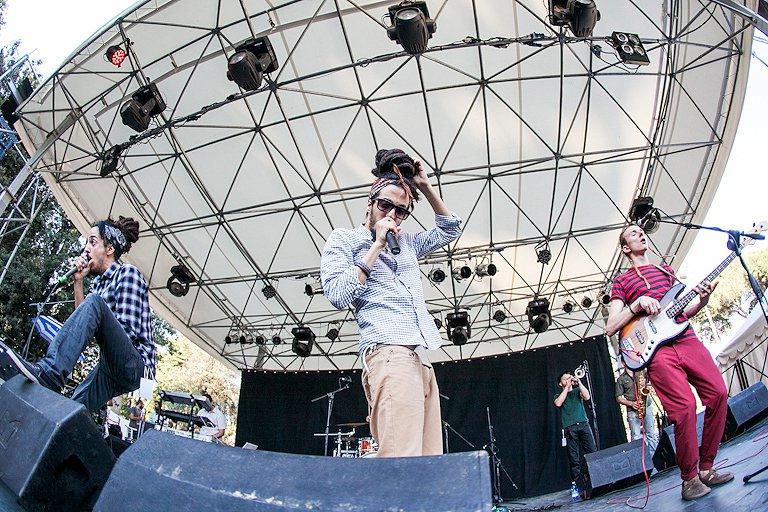
- At the Storm Twin in Rome, 2012

Background information
- Origin: Italy
- Genres: Reggae, New Roots, Dub, Rocksteady
- Years active: 2005–present
- Labels: Graduate, DEP, EMI
- Members: Jacopo Garzia; Lorenzo Garzia; Antonio Cicci; Giulio Frausin; Filippo Buresta
- Past members: Ricky Batondo; Stefano Salmaso; Roberto Dazzan
- Website: mellowmoodmusic.com

Mellow Mood is an Italian reggae band from Pordenone, Italy that formed in 2005.

== History ==
Mellow Mood first formed in 2005 when most members were in high school together, led by twins Jacopo and Lorenzo Garzia.

The band officially debuted in 2009 with their first studio album, Move!, produced by Paolo Baldini, who was later to become their sound architect. The album was intended to be their first "move" on the reggae scene and gained unexpected international success. Thanks to their heartfelt live shows, Rototom Sunsplash named Mellow Mood "best Italian reggae band", and ranked them third at European level in the same year. The two singles off the album, "Only You" and "Dance Inna Babylon", now have a total of more than fifty million views on YouTube.

After a line-up change, Mellow Mood went back into the studio with Baldini to record Well Well Well, and were signed by Italy's most important independent label, La Tempesta, in 2012. Sailing through roots-reggae, rocksteady and tribal clubbing, Mellow Mood proved to be among the protagonists of a new generation of reggae artists hailing from all over the world. A major European tour followed and led the band to play in 12 countries, performing at important festivals like Rototom Sunsplash, Sziget Festival, and Reggae Camp.

Mellow Mood then released two albums, Twinz and 2 The World in 2014 and 2015 respectively. Produced by Paolo Baldini and published by La Tempesta, the albums are enriched by international collaborations (Tanya Stephens, Jah9, Richie Campbell, Hempress Sativa, Sr. Wilson, Forelock, and KG Man, among others) and couple the rediscovery of roots music with a deeper knowledge of the most recent Jamaican sounds.

In late 2015, Mellow Mood also celebrated the birth of their own sub-label, La Tempesta Dub (to release the band's future works) with a touring mini-festival featuring international guests.

Mellow Mood kept busy touring Europe and America intensively in 2016 and 2017, performing at many of the most important reggae events of both continents.

In 2020, Mellow Mood was one of many reggae bands that were featured on Collie Buddz Cali Roots Riddim 2020 album, which included their song "Unstoppable".

Mellow Mood was featured on Fortunate Youth's 2021 single, "Around The World".

== Lineup ==
=== Current members ===
- Jacopo Garzia – Vocals, Guitar (2005–present)
- Lorenzo Garzia – Vocals, Guitar (2005–present)
- Giulio Frausin – Bass, Vocals (2005–present)
- Filippo Buresta – Keyboards (2011–present)
- Antonio Cicci – Drums (2015–present)

=== Former members ===
- Ricky Batondo – Keyboards (2005–2011)
- Stefano Salmaso – Saxophone (2005–2012)
- Roberto Dazzan – Trumpet (2005–2013)

== Discography ==
=== Albums ===
- 2009 - Move!
- 2012 - Well Well Well
- 2014 - Twinz
- 2015 - 2 the World
- 2018 - Large
- 2022 - Mañana
- 2025 - 7

=== Singles ===
- 2010 - "Dance inna babylon"
- 2010 - "Only You"
- 2012 - "Inna Jail"
- 2012 - "She's So Nice"
- 2012 - "Refugee"
- 2012 - "Free Marijuana" feat. Damas Music
- 2013 - "Show Us"
- 2013 - "Do mi Thing"
- 2013 - "Informers" feat. KG Man
- 2013 - "Dig Dig Dig"
- 2013 - "Extra Love" feat. Tanya Stephens
- 2014 - "Inna Jamaica" feat. Richie Campbell
- 2015 - "Inna Jamaica pt.2" feat. Hempress Sativa & Forelock
- 2015 - "Criminal" feat. Andrew I

=== Collaborations ===
- 2010 - "Sensi" (Africa Unite)
- 2012 - "Nel giardino dei fantasmi" (Tre Allegri Ragazzi Morti)
- 2022 - "Just One" (Quartiere Coffee)

== Awards ==
- 2009 - Italian Reggae Contest of Rototom Sunsplash.
