= Sigafoos =

Sigafoos is a surname. Notable people with the surname include:

- Frank Sigafoos (1904–1968), American baseball player
- Jeff Sigafoos, New Zealand professor of educational psychology
