= Africa Unite =

Africa Unite may refer to:

- Africa Unite: The Singles Collection, an album by Bob Marley and the Wailers
- "Africa Unite" (song), by Bob Marley
- Africa Unite (band), an Italian reggae band

== See also ==
- Africa United (disambiguation)
