= Research in Developmental Disabilities =

- Discipline: Child psychiatry
- Language: English
- Edited by: Dagmara Dimitriou

Publication details
- Former name(s): Analysis and Intervention in Developmental Disabilities, Applied Research in Mental Retardation
- History: 1987–present
- Publisher: Elsevier
- Frequency: Bimonthly
- Impact factor: 3.635 (2021)

Standard abbreviations
- ISO 4: Res. Dev. Disabil.

Indexing
- CODEN: RDDIEF
- ISSN: 0891-4222 (print); 1873-3379 (web)

Links
- Journal homepage

Research in Developmental Disabilities is a bimonthly peer-reviewed medical journal covering developmental disabilities. It was formed in 1987 by the merger of Analysis and Intervention in Developmental Disabilities and Applied Research in Mental Retardation, which were established in 1981 and 1980, respectively. It is published by Elsevier and the editor-in-chief is Dagmara Dimitriou (UCL Institute of Education).

In early February of 2015, the journal's founding editor-in-chief Johnny Matson (Louisiana State University) was accused of excessively citing his own works and thereby inflating his citation counts. An investigation by Elsevier came to the conclusion that Matson had used his position to have papers published without proper peer review that used assessment batteries developed by himself and sold through a company registered in his wife's name, failing to report this conflict of interest. This eventually led to the retraction of 24 papers across Research in Developmental Disabilities and Research in Autism Spectrum Disorders, a second Elsevier journal edited by Matson. Matson was also criticized for publishing a large number of his own papers, citing his own work, in these journals. Effective March 2015 Elsevier appointed Dagmara Dimitriou as the new editor-in-chief and updated the journal's editorial policies.

== Abstracting and indexing ==
The journal is abstracted and indexed in:

- BIOSIS Previews
- Behavioral Medicine Abstracts
- Elsevier Biobase
- Current Contents/Social & Behavioral Sciences
- Current Index to Journals in Education
- MEDLINE
- Embase
- ERIC
- PASCAL
- PsycINFO/Psychological Abstracts
- Scopus

According to the Journal Citation Reports, the journal has a 2021 impact factor of 3.635.
