= Questions About Behavior Function =

- Purpose: assess maladaptive behavior

The Questions About Behavior Function (QABF) measure is a widely used indirect assessment tool designed to assist mental health practitioners in assessing the function of maladaptive behaviors in individuals diagnosed with a developmental disability. It was co-developed by Johnny Matson. The measure a reporter-based instrument, which relies on information from raters who are familiar with the individual being assessed. As such, parents and caregivers are frequently asked to provide pertinent information. The measure consists of 25 items, each of which ask a question about an individual's behavior and require the rater to respond on a Likert-type rating scale. On the basis of the 25 items, the QABF produces scores in 5 distinct categories: Attention, Escape, Physical, Tangible, and Nonsocial.

== Empirical Support ==
The QABF is viewed to have good psychometric properties. Convergent validity between the QABF and the Motivation Assessment Scale (MAS) appears to be strongest, while convergent validity with analogue functional analyses appears to be lower than expected. Research suggests that since many behaviors may be contingent on multiple factors, measures such as the Functional Assessment for Multiple Causality may be better measures of behavioral function than the QABF.
