= Patria Hume =

New Zealand sports biomechanics academic

Patria Hume ONZM
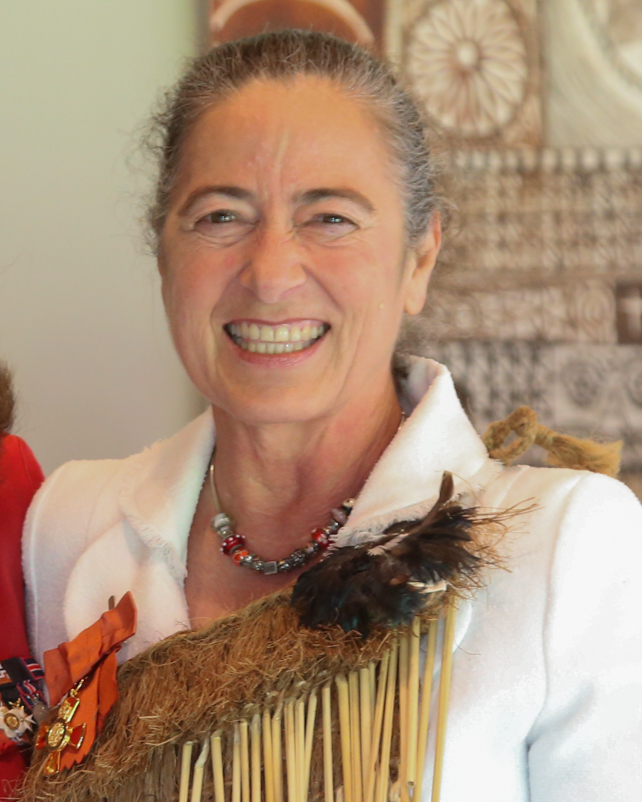
- Hume in 2026
- Born: 1966 (age 59–60)
- Citizenship: New Zealand
- Education: University of Otago, University of Auckland
- Awards: 2016 International Society of Biomechanics in Sports Geoffrey Dyson Award, 2016 AUT University Medal for outstanding contribution to research, 2008 Academic Challenge Award overall category winner and health category winner for the Zephyr Bioharness project.
- Scientific career
- Fields: Sports biomechanics, sports injury prevention, sports injury epidemiology, sports kinanthropometry
- Workplaces: University of Auckland, Auckland University of Technology
- Thesis: Effects of the Aircast ankle brace on the ankle during inversion movement (1999)
- Doctoral advisor: Barry Wilson; David Chalmers; Will Hopkins
- Doctoral students: Erica Hinckson

Patria Anne Hume ONZM is a New Zealand sports biomechanics academic. She is currently a full-time professor of human performance at the Auckland University of Technology Sport Performance Research Institute New Zealand (SPRINZ) at AUT Millennium.

Hume represented New Zealand in rhythmic gymnastics for six years, before coaching gymnasts who won medals at the 1990 Commonwealth Games. She is a Fellow of the Royal Society Te Apārangi.

== Academic career ==
Professor Patria Hume studied at the University of Otago in Biomechanics, MSc (Hons) with a double major in Sports Physiology and Sports Psychology University of Auckland, BSc with a double major in Physiology and Psychology University of Auckland, Postgraduate Certificate in Epidemiology (Rollins School of Public Health), Criterion Certification in Anthropometry (ISAK level 4), and ISAK Certification in Photoscopic Anthropometry. 2002 International Olympic Committee Diploma in Sport. Post doctorate studies from 1994 to 1996 were in sports injury biomechanics and sports injury prevention and were conducted at the University of Calgary with Professor Benno Nigg, in Zurich at ETHZ with Dr Alex Stacoff and at the University of Wollongong with Professor Julie Steele. Hume's biomechanics mentors have been Professor Barry Wilson (Otago), Professor James Hay (USA) and Professor Benno Nigg (Canada), with career mentors AUT Vice Chancellor Derek McCormack (NZ), and merchant banker Lex Henry (NZ). Her 1999 PhD thesis was titled Effects of the Aircast ankle brace on the ankle during inversion movement. Hume became full Professor in 2007 at the Auckland University of Technology. after starting there in 1999. Previous employment was at The University of Auckland and The University of Otago.

Hume's work on head injuries in rugby has been covered extensively in the press.

Hume's notable doctoral gradudates include Professor Erica Hinckson; Dr Doug King; Dr Ken Quarrie; Associate Professor Chris Whatman; Associate Professor Kelly Sheerin; Dr Clara Soper; Dr Jennie Coker; Dr Simon Gianotti; Dr Simon Gianotti; Dr Joshua McGeown; Dr Stephven Kolose; Dr Brian Russell; Dr Steve Hollings; Dr Simon Pearson; Dr Sarah Kate Miller; Dr Pornratshanee Weerapong; Dr Peter Maulder; Dr Lisa McDonnell; Dr Matt Kritz; Dr Jennifer Hewitt; Dr Rodrigo Bini; Victoria Neilson; Dr Ian Renshaw; Dr Boris Bacic; Dr Bobby Wilcox; Dr Anna Lorimar; Dr Scott Brown; Stephen Kara; Mel Henderson; Mark Jones; Glen Joe; Dan Vogel; Paul Davey; Karoline Cheng; Amy Honeyfield.

== Honours and awards ==
Hume was named a fellow of the International Society of Biomechanics in Sports at the 2010 conference in Marquette, Michigan.

In March 2021, Hume was created a Fellow of the Royal Society Te Apārangi, recognising that her research has "helped transform concussion injury awareness and management in New Zealand and internationally".

In the 2025 King’s Birthday Honours, Hume was appointed an Officer of the New Zealand Order of Merit, for services to sports science and injury prevention.

Professor Hume is Honorary Professor Auckland Bioengineering Institute University of Auckland, New Zealand, and Honorary Professor Law School University of Western Australia. Professor Hume is full time Professor of Human Performance at Auckland University of Technology, based at AUT Millennium.

== Selected works ==
- King, D., Hume, P. A., Cummins, C., Foskett, A., & Barnes, M. J. (2020). Changes in the stress and recovery of injured versus non-injured amateur domestic women's rugby union team players over a competition season in New Zealand. New Zealand Journal of Sports Medicine, 46(2).
- McGeown, J., Kara, S., Crosswell, H., Borotkanics, R., Hume, P. A., Quarrie, K., & Theadom, A. (2019). Predicting sport-originated brain injury recovery trajectory using initial clinical assessment findings: a retrospective cohort study. Sports Medicine. https://doi.org/doi.org/10.1007/s40279-019-01240-4
- King, D., Hume, P. A., Gissane, C., & Clark, T. (2017). Semi-professional rugby league players have higher concussion risk than professional or amateur participants: A pooled analysis. Sports Medicine, 47(2), 197–205. https://doi.org/10.1007/s40279-016-0576-z
- Pearson, S. N., Hume, P. A., Cronin, J. B., & Slyfield, D. (2016). America's Cup sailing: Effect of standing arm-cranking (‘grinding’) direction on muscle activity, kinematics, and torque application. Sports, 4(3), 12. https://doi.org/10.3390/sports4030037
- Hewit, J. K., Cronin, J. B., & Hume, P. A. (2012). Asymmetry in multi-directional jumping tasks. Physical Therapy in Sport, 13(4), 238–242.
- Bradshaw, E., & Hume, P. A. (2012). Biomechanical approaches to identify and quantify injury mechanisms and risk factors in women's artistic gymnastics. Sports Biomechanics, 11(3), 324–341. https://doi.org/10.1080/14763141.2011.650186
- Hume, P. A., Hopkins, W. G., Robinson, D. M., Robinson, S. M., & Hollings, S. C. (1993). Predictors of attainment in rhythmic sportive gymnastics. Journal of Sports Medicine and Physical Fitness, 33(4), 367–377.
- Hume, P. A. (1993). Netball injuries in New Zealand. New Zealand Journal of Sports Medicine, 21(2), 27–31.
- Hopkins, W. G., Hume, P. A., Robinson, D. M., & Robinson, S. M. (1991). Training intensity of elite male distance runners. Medicine and Science in Sports and Exercise, 23(9), 1078–1082.
