= Research in Autism Spectrum Disorders =

- Discipline: Psychiatry
- Language: English
- Edited by: Dagmara Dimitriou

Publication details
- History: 2007–present
- Publisher: Elsevier
- Frequency: Monthly
- Open access: Hybrid
- Impact factor: 2.907 (2012)

Standard abbreviations
- ISO 4: Res. Autism Spectr. Disord.

Indexing
- ISSN: 1750-9467
- OCLC no.: 85899250

Links
- Journal homepage; Online access

Research in Autism Spectrum Disorders is a peer-reviewed medical journal published monthly by Elsevier. It covers applied topics pertaining to autism spectrum disorders. Since the spring of 2023, the editor-in-chief is David Beversdorf (University of Missouri).

According to the Journal Citation Reports, in 2012 the journal had an impact factor of 2.907.

In early February 2015, the journal's founding editor-in-chief Johnny Matson (Louisiana State University) was accused of excessively citing his own works and thereby inflating his citation counts. An investigation by Elsevier came to the conclusion that Matson had used his position to have papers published without proper peer review that used assessment batteries developed by himself and sold through a company registered in his wife's name, failing to report this conflict of interest. This eventually led to the retraction of 24 papers across Research in Autism Spectrum Disorders and Research in Developmental Disabilities, a second Elsevier journal edited by Matson. Matson was also criticized for publishing a large number of his own papers, citing his own work, in these journals. In February 2015 Elsevier appointed Sebastian Gaigg (City University of London) as the new editor-in-chief and updated the journal's editorial policies.

== Editors ==
The following persons have been editor-in-chief:

- Johnny Matson (Louisiana State University), 2007–2015
- Sebastian Gaigg (City University London), 2015–2023
- David Beversdorf (University of Missouri), 2023–2025
- Dagmara Dimitriou (University College London), 2026–to present
