= Jaime Hinckson =

Jamaican-American musician (born 1988)

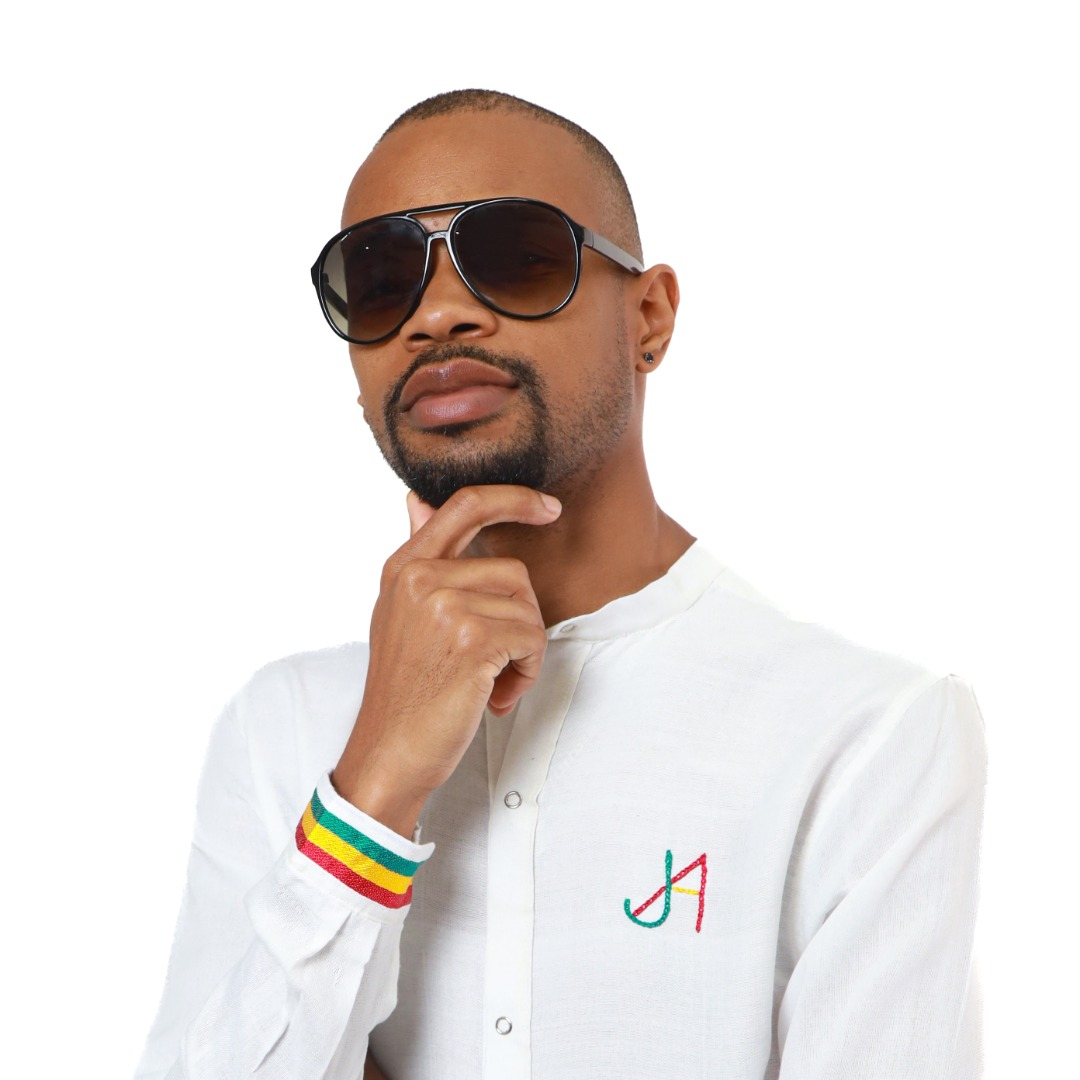

Background information
- Born: Jaime Andrew Hinckson; June 4, 1988 (age 38); Miami, Florida, US
- Genres: Reggae, Jazz, Hip Hop, Instrumental
- Occupations: Pianist, Composer, Producer
- Instruments: Piano, Hammond Organ, Clavinet, Synth
- Years active: 2006 – present
- Label: Miss Mac Music
- Website: www.jaimehinckson.com

Jaime Hinckson (born Jaime Andrew Hinckson on June 4, 1988) is a Jamaican American jazz pianist and composer who produces reggae, hip hop, and R&B music. Hinckson's unique improvisational style draws from traditions of jazz along with his strong Caribbean heritage. His musical influences include Erroll Garner, Monty Alexander, and his childhood jazz piano instructor Leslie Butler (musician).

== Early years ==
Jaime Hinckson was born on June 4, 1988, in Miami, Florida. Hinckson began playing classical piano at the age of seven studying music with Joan McMorris, the inspiration for his first album and the woman he credits for encouraging him to pursue music. At the age of 12, Hinckson began playing contemporary jazz with instructor Leslie Butler, a prodigious pianist out of Jamaica. Much of Hinckson's style was developed during his time studying jazz piano.

As a sophomore in high school at age 14, Hinckson was a national winner of the NAACP ACT-SO competition performing as a solo pianist.

In 2006, Hinckson went on to perform at the Air Jamaica Jazz and Blues Festival in Montego Bay, Jamaica alongside well-known artists including John Legend, Shaggy, Patti LaBelle, Al Green and Air Supply.

== Career ==
Hinckson's self-produced debut album, Take Flight, was released on September 7, 2013. The record consists of nine studio recorded instrumental covers of popular songs from Bob Marley, Bruno Mars, Michael Jackson, John Legend, Erroll Garner and Toots and the Maytals as well as his original composition, “Miss Mac,” named after his childhood music instructor and mentor Joan McMorris. The album made its radio debut on local Miami stations WDNA 88.9 FM and The Biz 880 AM. Hinckson also recorded a remix of “Miss Mac,” at Tuff Gong Studios in Kingston, Jamaica in 2013.

In 2014, he toured around the U.S. performing with U.K. reggae artist, Hollie Cook, including live performances on 90.3 KEXP-FM Seattle Radio, Sirius XM Satellite Radio and AtGoogleTalks. Throughout 2015, he performed at several iconic venues including House of Blues on Sunset, The Troubadour (Los Angeles), Wiltern Theater and Greek Theatre (Los Angeles) where he opened for Lauryn Hill. Shortly thereafter, Hinckson released three reggae jazz piano singles, "Sun Daze", "Care Less" and "Nostalgia".

Hinckson is best known for his role as keyboardist and musical director in son of Bob Marley, Julian Marley's band, The Uprising. He continues to tour with The Uprising but has worked with other reggae artists, including The Wailing Souls, Hollie Cook, The Wailers Band, Hempress Sativa, and Jesse Royal (musician).

In 2016, Hinckson began experimenting with hip hop jazz instrumental music with the release of his debut single, entitled "Push". Continuing within this genre, he released another hip hop jazz single, "Osmosis", in 2018.

Hinckson released his second album, Take Time—a 13-track collection inspired by hip hop musicians such as J Dilla and Pete Rock in July 2020.

Continuing to record through 2022, the Miami-based artist released his latest project, Fresh Produce, in tandem with an assortment of international remixes distributed on his very own label, Miss Mac Music.

== Discography ==
=== Albums ===
- Take Flight (2013)
- Take Time (2020)
- Fresh Produce (2022)

=== Singles ===
- "Sun Daze" (2015)
- "Care Less" (2015)
- "Nostalgia" (2015)
- "Push" (2016)
- "Osmosis" (2018)
