= The Harvest (Tribal Seeds album) =

Studio album by Tribal Seeds
- Released: June 2009
- Recorded: Signature Sound Studios, San Diego, California
- Genre: Roots Reggae
- Length: 1:02:31
- Label: Independent

Tribal Seeds chronology
Tribal Seeds (2008)	The Harvest (2009)

The Harvest is the third full-length studio album by American Roots Reggae band Tribal Seeds. The album was released in 2009 and debuted at number five on the Billboard reggae charts.

== Track listing ==
All songs written by Steven Rene Jacobo and Tony-Ray Jacobo.

No.	Title	Length
1.	"The Garden"	4:58
2.	"Warning" (feat. Sonny Sandoval from P.O.D.)	4:17
3.	"All I Know"	3:16
4.	"Stillness of Night"	4:32
5.	"Herby"	3:39
6.	"Love Psalm"	4:35
7.	"Come Around"	4:27
8.	"144,000"	5:36
9.	"Away"	4:49
10.	"Mad Man"	3:57
11.	"Night Raver"	4:08
12.	"Libertad" (ft. Dready)	4:48
13.	"The Harvest"	5:12
14.	"Vampire" (feat. Whiteboy John)	4:24
Total length:		1:02:31

== Credits ==
Performers

- Steven Rene Jacobo – Lead Vocals/Guitar
- Tony-Ray Jacobo – Keys/Percussions
- John Wegener – Bass (Vocals on Vampire and Come Around)
- Tony Navarro – Guitar (Vocals on Libertad)
- Carlos Verdugo – Drums

Additional Credits

- Recording and Mixing – Alan Sanderson
- Mastering – Erik Lobson
