= L'Invasione degli Omini Verdi =

Italian punk rock band

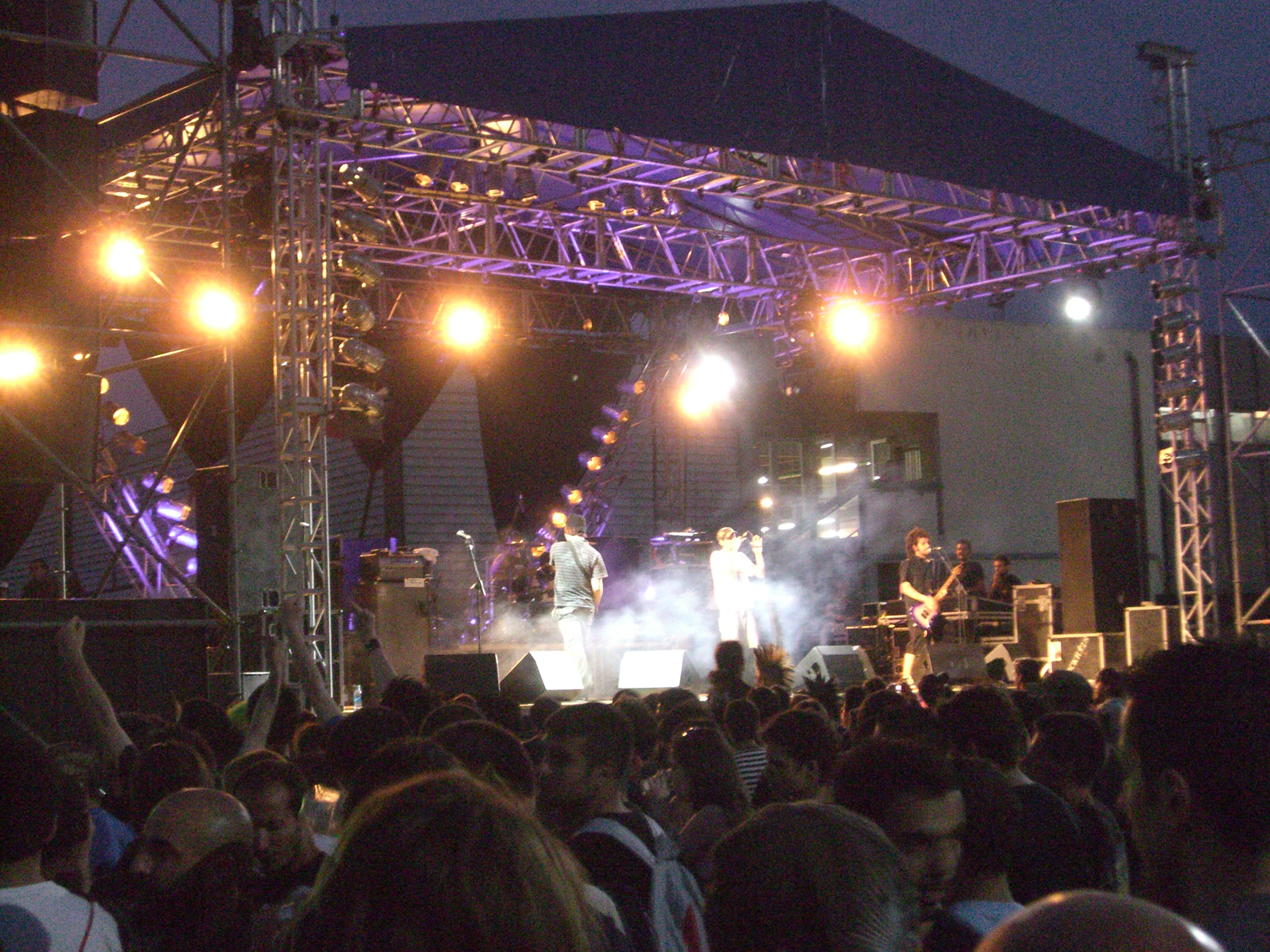
- L'Invasione degli Omini Verdi live in Cagliari, Sardinia (2008)

Background information
- Origin: Lombardy, Italy
- Genres: Melodic hardcore, hardcore punk
- Years active: 1999–present
- Labels: Indiebox Records
- Members: Ale; Gio; Giaco; Mauri
- Past members: Fano; Peco; Patrick
- Website: www.linvasionedegliominiverdi.it

L'invasione degli Omini Verdi is an Italian punk rock band, formed in July 1999 in the province of Brescia, Lombardy. They are associated with bands like Derozer, Punkreas, Porno Riviste, Shandon and Cattive Abitudini, which play a leading role in the Italian punk rock scene.

== History ==
The band was formed in 1999, between Mantua and Brescia, and made up of Maurizio (drums), Alessandro (singer), Patrick (bass) and Peco and Fano (guitars). Soon Fano left the band and Ale played guitar. The first official album, Veniamo in pace, was released in 2001.

Peco left the group during a 2002 tour and they found a new guitarist, Gio, which let Ale focus on singing. The lineup has not changed since.

== Lineup ==
- Ale – singer
- Gio – guitarist
- Giaco – bassist
- Mauri – drummer

== Discography ==
=== Albums ===
- Demo Autoprodotto (Self-produced demo) 2000
- Veniamo in Pace (We come in peace) 2001
- Non è un Gioco (It's not a game) 2003
- Contro (Against) 2005
- Mondo a parte (World apart) 2007
- Nel nome di chi? (In the name of who?) 2010
- Il banco piange (The kitty is short) 2013

== Available videos ==
- Rottami live @ Boulevard
