= Hempress Sativa =

Jamaican singer-songwriter (born 1984)

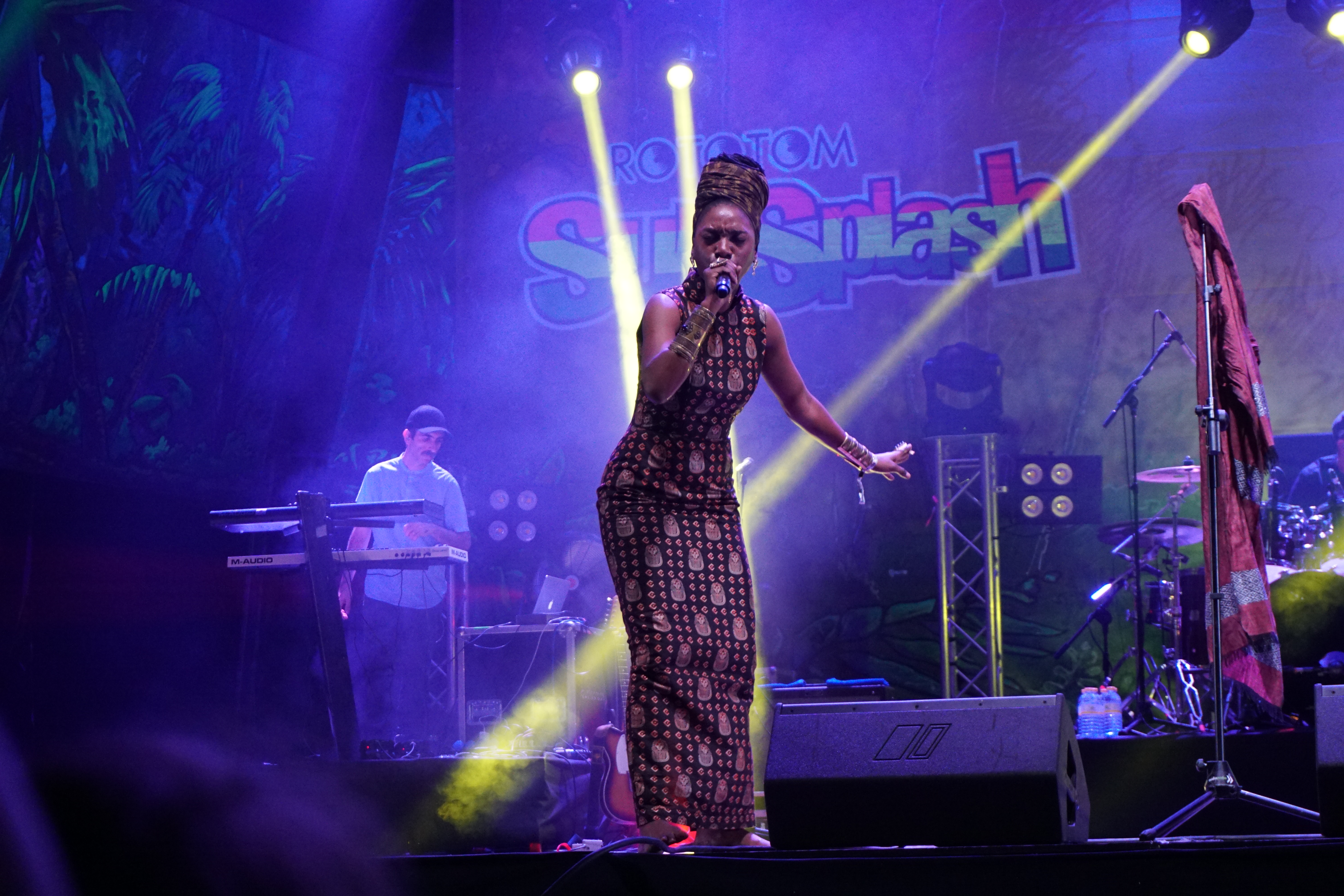
- Hempress Sativa at Rototom Sunsplash 2017

Background information
- Also known as: Queen Cannabis, The Lyrical Machine
- Born: Kerida Shushana Johnson; 15 July 1984 (age 41)
- Origin: Papine, Jamaica
- Genres: Reggae, dub
- Occupation: Singer · songwriter
- Labels: Conquering Lion Records
- Website: hempresssativa.com

Kerida Shushana Johnson (born 15 July 1984), known professionally as Hempress Sativa, is a contemporary reggae singer and songwriter from Jamaica. Her music aligns with the roots reggae tradition with variants of hip hop, afrobeats and R&B.

== Early life ==
Born and raised in Papine, Jamaica to Rastafarian parents, Doris-Ray Johnson and Albert ‘Ilawi Malawi’ Johnson of Jah Love Sound System, Sativa was exposed to music from a very early age. During an interview with World A Reggae, she spoke of her early life:

"My father would give my siblings and I the microphone and record anything that came out. So I have on records what I sounded like at age 4 and older. At the age of 13, I performed for the very first time at King Bebo Lawn at a Twelve Tribes of Israel showcase".

== Recording career ==
In 2013, Sativa was involved in a series of releases as part of the Jah Ova Evil Movement, including "Jah Have Mi Back", "Children Of The Emperor", "Get High", "Judgement", "Top Rank Queens" and "Marching Outta Babylon". The Movement, which also included the likes of Chronixx, The Gideon & Selah, Kazam and Infinite was created to celebrate and carry on the legacy of reggae artist, Alty 'Lil Joe' Nunes who died in 2011. Sativa also released "Ooh LaLaLa (The Weed Thing)", which is a tribute to marijuana and its healing properties. The song also pays homage to Lauryn Hill, the Fugees and their international hit, "Fu-Gee-La".

In 2015, she was featured on Mellow Mood’s, "Inna Jamaica, Pt.2", Micah Shemaiah's, "Dread At The Control" and Paolo Baldini Dubfiles'’, "Boom (Wah Da Da Deng)".

In 2016, Sativa sang on Kabaka Pyramid's track, "All For One" alongside Protoje, Koro Fyah and Pressure. The track, which featured on the "Accurate Mixtape" was produced by Walshy Fire of electronic dance music trio, Major Lazer.

In 2017, Sativa released her debut album Unconquerebel. Featuring previously released tracks such as "Rock It Ina Dance", "Boom (Wah Da Da Deng)", "Fight For Your Rights" and "Twisted Sheets", the album reached Number 1 in the Global Reggae Charts. She also released the single, "No Retreat", featuring the vocals of Junior Murvin.

In 2018, Sativa released Scientist Meets Hempress Sativa In Dub – a dub version of 2017's, Unconquerebel. The album, which was mixed by Scientist and produced by Conquering Lion Records featured guest appearances from reggae vocalist, Ranking Joe and Italian producer, Paolo Baldini.

2019 saw the release of the "Ancient Kingdom EP" and the single "Boom Shakalak", which reached in excess of one million YouTube views within a year of its release. She also made a guest appearance on the "Anbessa World Mixtape" – a collection of tracks curated by reggae singer, Kelissa and deejay, Shacia Päyne Marley. Sativa was featured on Kelissa's track, "Pass Dat Kutchie", which is an interpolation of Missy Elliot's, "Pass That Dutch".

Sativa's most recent work is 2020's, "Rastafari Rise", a collaboration with music collective, Suns of Dub.

== Touring and events ==
She has performed at Reggae Geel, Rototom Sunsplash, Reggae on the River, Red Bull Sound Select, Rebel Salute, Dallas Reggae Festival, Austin Reggae Festival, Beloved Festival, Viña Rock, Sierra Nevada World Music Festival and Reggae Sumfest.

Hempress Sativa also runs 'Hempress Sativa Live' – an annual event in Kingston, Jamaica providing a platform for up and coming musicians to showcase and hone their talent.

== Discography ==
=== Albums ===
- Unconquerebel (2017)
- Scientist Meets Hempress Sativa in Dub (2018)
- Charka (2023)

=== EPs ===
- Ancient Kingdom (2019) – with Daweh Congo and Ras Malekot

=== Singles ===
- "Jah Have Mi Back" (2013) – with Jah Ova Evil Movement
- "Children of the Emperor" (2013) – with Jah Ova Evil Movement
- "Get High" (2013) – with Jah Ova Evil Movement
- "Judgement" (2013) – with Jah Ova Evil Movement
- "Top Rank Queens" (2013) – with Jah Ova Evil Movement
- "Marching Outta Babylon" (2013) – with Jah Ova Evil Movement
- "Ooh LaLaLa (The Weed Thing)" (2013)
- "Kushite Love" (2013)
- "Still Surviving" (2014)
- "Freedom" (2014)
- "Inna Jamaica, Pt.2" (2015) – with Mellow Mood and Forelock
- "Dread at the Control" (2015) – with Micah Shemaiah, Tj Likkle Briggie, Infinite and Jahkime
- "Jah Live" (2015) – with Jah Ova Evil Movement
- "Boom – Wah Da Da Deng" (2015) – with Paolo Baldini Dubfiles
- "All For One" (2016) – with Kabaka Pyramid, Protoje, Koro Fyah and Pressure
- "Song Embassy Medley, Pt.3" (2016) – with Paolo Baldini Dubfiles, Damas, The Gideon & Selah
- "Rock It Ina Dance" (2016)
- "Twisted Sheets (So High)" (2016)
- "Fight For Your Rights" (2016)
- "Motherland" (2017) – with Micah Shemaiah and Infinite
- "Roots Rockin" (2017) – with Marla Brown
- "No Retreat" (2017) – with Junior Murvin
- "Rock It Ina Dance" (Extended Mix) (2018)
- "No Retreat" (Extended Mix) (2018) – with Junior Murvin
- "Boom Shakalak" (2019)
- "Pass Dat Kutchie" (2019) – Hempress Sativa is a guest vocalist on this Kelissa track
- "Rastafari Rise" (2020) – with Suns of Dub
- "Scheme" (2021)
- "Wicked And Riled" (2021) - with Tribal Seeds
