= Vanessa Green =

New Zealand educational theorist and academic

Vanessa Ann Green
- Education: Queensland University of Technology
- Scientific career
- Fields: bullying, autism
- Workplaces: University of Texas at Austin, University of Tasmania, Victoria University of Wellington
- Thesis: Gender and social competence as predictors of social interaction in a limited resource situation (1998)

Vanessa Ann Green is a New Zealand educational theorist and academic. She is currently a full professor at the Victoria University of Wellington.

== Academic career ==
After a 1993 Master's in Education thesis titled 'The effects of non-sexist literature on children's sex-typed toy-play behaviour' and a 1998 PhD titled 'Gender and social competence as predictors of social interaction in a limited resource situation,' both from the Queensland University of Technology, Green worked at the University of Texas at Austin and the University of Tasmania before moving to Victoria University of Wellington, where she became a full professor in 2016.

Green's research focuses on bullying and communication interventions for children with autism.

== Selected works ==
- Green, Vanessa A., Keenan A. Pituch, Jonathan Itchon, Aram Choi, Mark O'Reilly, and Jeff Sigafoos. "Internet survey of treatments used by parents of children with autism." Research in developmental disabilities 27, no. 1 (2006): 70–84.
- Kagohara, Debora M., Larah van der Meer, Sathiyaprakash Ramdoss, Mark F. O'Reilly, Giulio E. Lancioni, Tonya N. Davis, Mandy Rispoli et al. "Using iPods® and iPads® in teaching programs for individuals with developmental disabilities: A systematic review." Research in developmental disabilities 34, no. 1 (2013): 147–156.
- Hemsley, Bronwyn, Jeff Sigafoos, Susan Balandin, Ralph Forbes, Christine Taylor, Vanessa A. Green, and Trevor Parmenter. "Nursing the patient with severe communication impairment." Journal of advanced nursing 35, no. 6 (2001): 827–835.
- Kagohara, Debora M., Larah van der Meer, Donna Achmadi, Vanessa A. Green, Mark F. O'Reilly, Austin Mulloy, Giulio E. Lancioni, Russell Lang, and Jeff Sigafoos. "Behavioral intervention promotes successful use of an iPod-based communication device by an adolescent with autism." Clinical Case Studies 9, no. 5 (2010): 328–338.
- Green, Vanessa A., and Ruth Rechis. "Children's cooperative and competitive interactions in limited resource situations: A literature review." Journal of Applied Developmental Psychology 27, no. 1 (2006): 42–59.
