= Karen Witten =

New Zealand public health academic

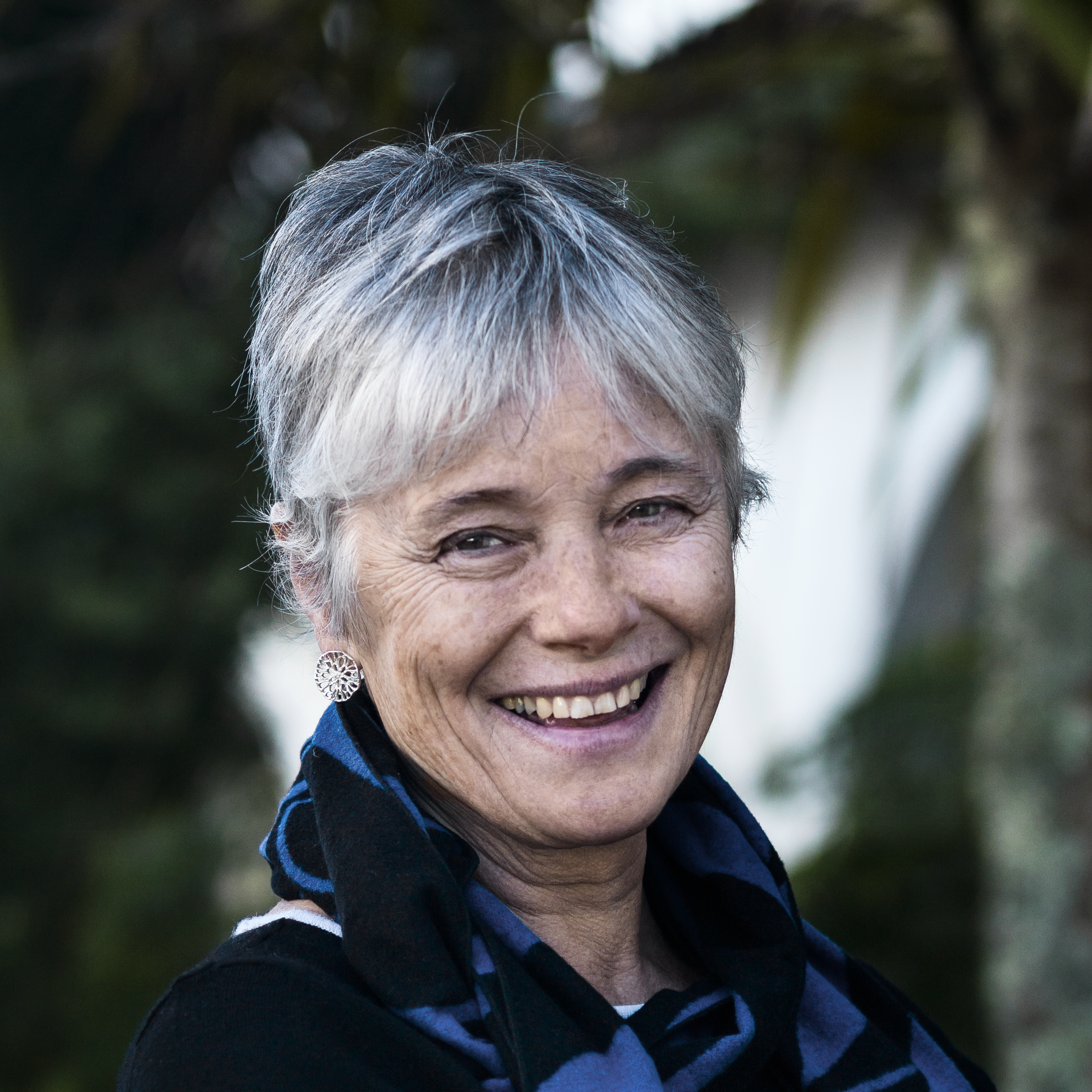
- Education: University of Auckland
- Scientific career
- Fields: public health
- Workplaces: University of Auckland; Massey University
- Thesis: Placing caregiving : parenting in diverse localities in suburban Auckland (2005)

Karen Witten is a New Zealand public health academic. She is currently a full professor at Massey University.

== Academic career ==
Witten's 2005 PhD geography thesis from the University of Auckland concerned the six diverse suburban localities in Auckland and the implications of living there for parents raising children and the impacts on health and health inequality. The title of her thesis was Placing caregiving: parenting in diverse localities in suburban Auckland.

Witten has worked at the University of Auckland and Massey University, where her work has continued to relate to geographic determiners of health and health inequality, studying things such as fast-food locations, open spaces and bicycling.

== Selected works ==
- Pearce, Jamie; Blakely, Tony; Witten, Karen; Bartie, Phil (2007). "Neighborhood deprivation and access to fast-food retailing: a national study". American Journal of Preventive Medicine. 32 (5): 375–382.
- Pearce, Jamie; Witten, Karen; Bartie, Phil (2006). "Neighbourhoods and health: a GIS approach to measuring community resource accessibility". Journal of Epidemiology and Community Health. 60 (5): 389–395.
- Pearce, Jamie; Witten, Karen; Hiscock, Rosemary; Blakely, Tony (2006). "Are socially disadvantaged neighbourhoods deprived of health-related community resources?". International Journal of Epidemiology. 36 (2): 348–355.
- Mavoa, Suzanne; Witten, Karen; McCreanor, Tim; O’Sullivan, David (2012). "GIS based destination accessibility via public transit and walking in Auckland, New Zealand". Journal of Transport Geography. 20 (1): 15–22.
- Witten, Karen; Hiscock, Rosemary; Pearce, Jamie; Blakely, Tony (2008). "Neighbourhood access to open spaces and the physical activity of residents: a national study". Preventive Medicine. 47 (3): 299–303.
- Witten, Karen; Exeter, Daniel; Field, Adrian (2003). "The quality of urban environments: mapping variation in access to community resources". Urban Studies. 40 (1): 161–177.
