= Sud Sound System =

Italian reggae band

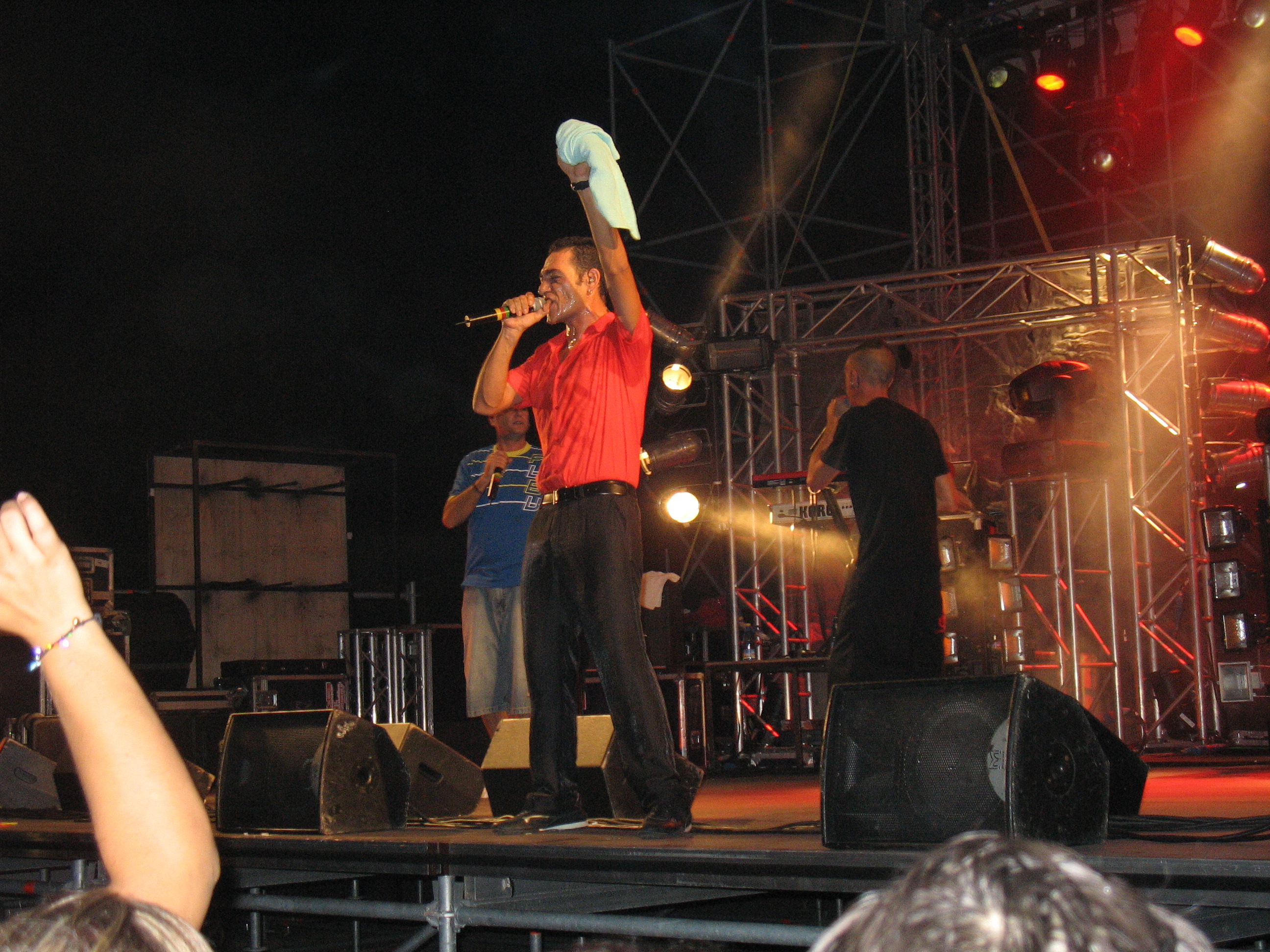

Background information
- Origin: Salento, Apulia
- Genres: Reggae
- Years active: 1991–present
- Members: Don Rico (Federico Vaglio); Papa Gianni, GGD; Terron Fabio (Fabio Miglietta); Nandu Popu (Fernando Blasi)
- Past members: Gopher D; Militant P; Treble; Dj War (until 1994)
- Website: sudsoundsystem.it

Sud Sound System is a dancehall reggae sound system from Salento, Apulia, Italy. The group combines Jamaican rhythms and local culture, such as their Salentino dialect in their lyrics and dance moves from pizzica and tarantella. They are pioneers of Italian ragga music, a branch of reggae. Although the group is popular throughout Italy, they have become well known for their lyrics—always in dialect—about social, political and economic issues in Southern Italy.
