= Jeff Sigafoos =

New Zealand professor of educational psychology

Jeffrey Scott Sigafoos
- Education: University of Minnesota
- Scientific career
- Fields: educational psychology
- Thesis: Comparing explicit to generic vocabulary in teaching requests (1989)

Jeffrey Scott Sigafoos is a New Zealand professor of educational psychology.

After a PhD from the University of Minnesota, Sigafoos has held roles at University of Queensland, University of Sydney, and the University of Texas at Austin. He is currently a professor at Victoria University of Wellington and an adjunct professor at James Madison University.

Sigafoos has been editor-in-chief of the journals Evidence-based Communication Assessment and Developmental Neurorehabilitation. In 2015, Sigafoos was implicated in a scandal involving Johnny Matson and another two academic journals, Research in Developmental Disabilities and Research in Autism Spectrum Disorders, according to which Matson allegedly accepted papers by a select group of authors including himself and Sigafoos for publication in these journals without first sending them out for peer review.

== Selected works ==
- Challenging behavior and developmental disability
- Technology and teaching
- One-to-one training : instructional procedures for learners with developmental disabilities
- Implementing augmentative and alternative communication : strategies for learners with severe disabilities
