= Dready =

Jamaican character and art style

Dready is a character and a style of art created by West Indian (Jamaican born) artist Shane Aquart. The art began by focusing on a humorous Caribbean character called Dready but grew over time to become a style of its own in which the artist himself is ″Dready″.

== History ==
Dready began as a doodle, in the vein of those in Mad Magazine, around the edges of Shane’s workbooks, but he didn’t begin planning the first Dready designs until the late 1990s. He began selling his art on postcards and T shirts in Barbados, Grenada, Cayman and Jamaica in late 2005, and on bags and baseball caps in 2006.

Dready as a business was launched in January 2008. This coincided with a shift by the artist from merchandise to contemporary wall art, with his first group show in 2009 and his first permanent gallery placement in 2010. Dready’s first solo art show was in 2013 at the National Gallery of the Cayman Islands in a show called; ‘Things that exist only in my fading memory.'

Dready was included in the national collection of the Cayman Islands in 2011 and again in 2013 and 2019. He has had a permanent placement in the Walking Gallery at the Ritz-Carlton since 2011. His first solo shows in Jamaica were held in 2014 and 2015. His first group show was at the OXO tower in London in 2017. Dready art has also been included in the Ritz-Carlton, Grand Cayman.

In 2021 Dready became the first artist in Cayman to be asked to do an NFT linked artwork to auction, the Koman Fine Art Gallery in Vero Beach, Florida. The art was featured in the Half Moon resort in Jamaica.

== Work ==
Dready is a mixture of pop art and poster art. His designs are drawn digitally. Common motifs include Range Rovers.

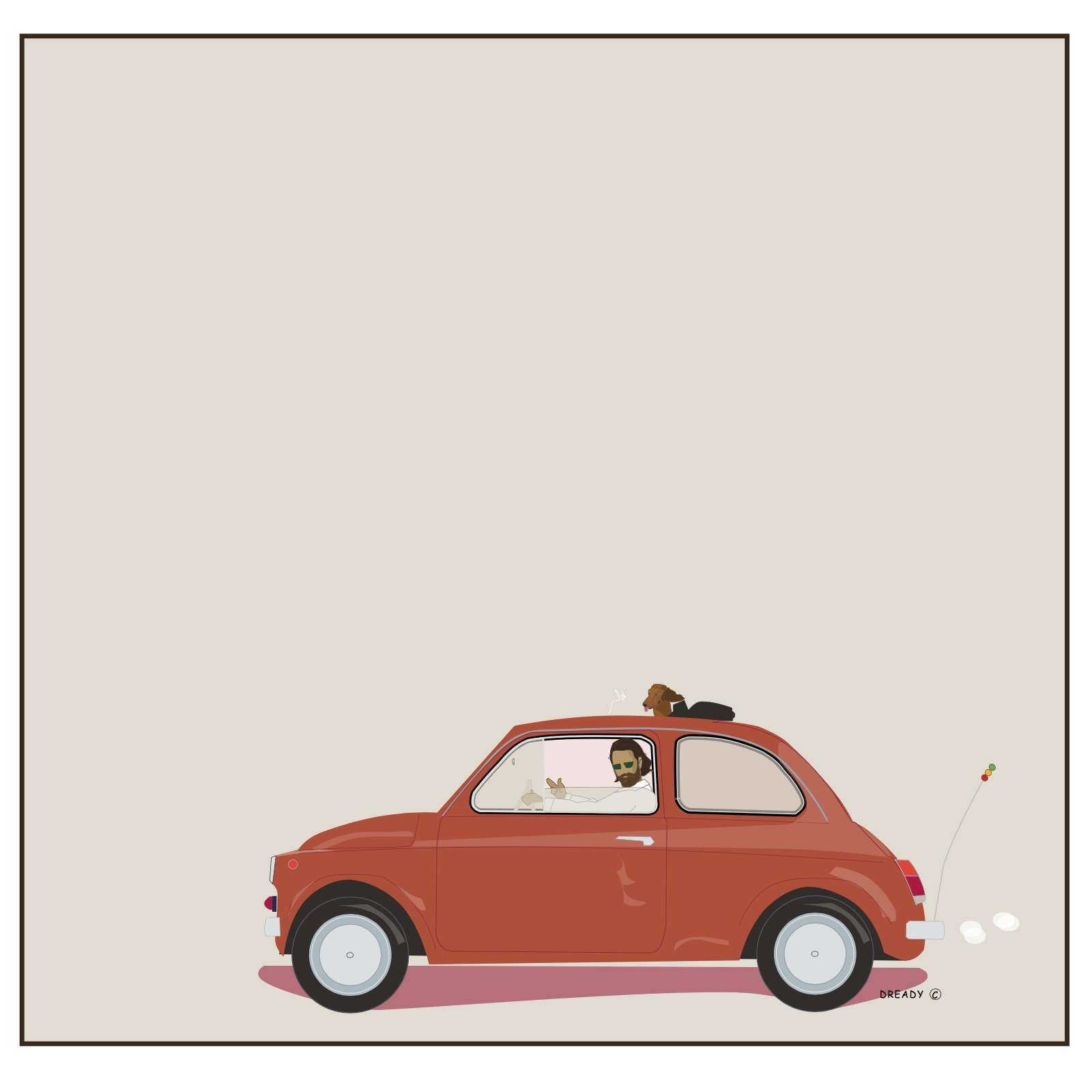
Dready pablo takes a breeze out - fiat 500
