= Rototom Sunsplash =

Annual reggae festival in Spain

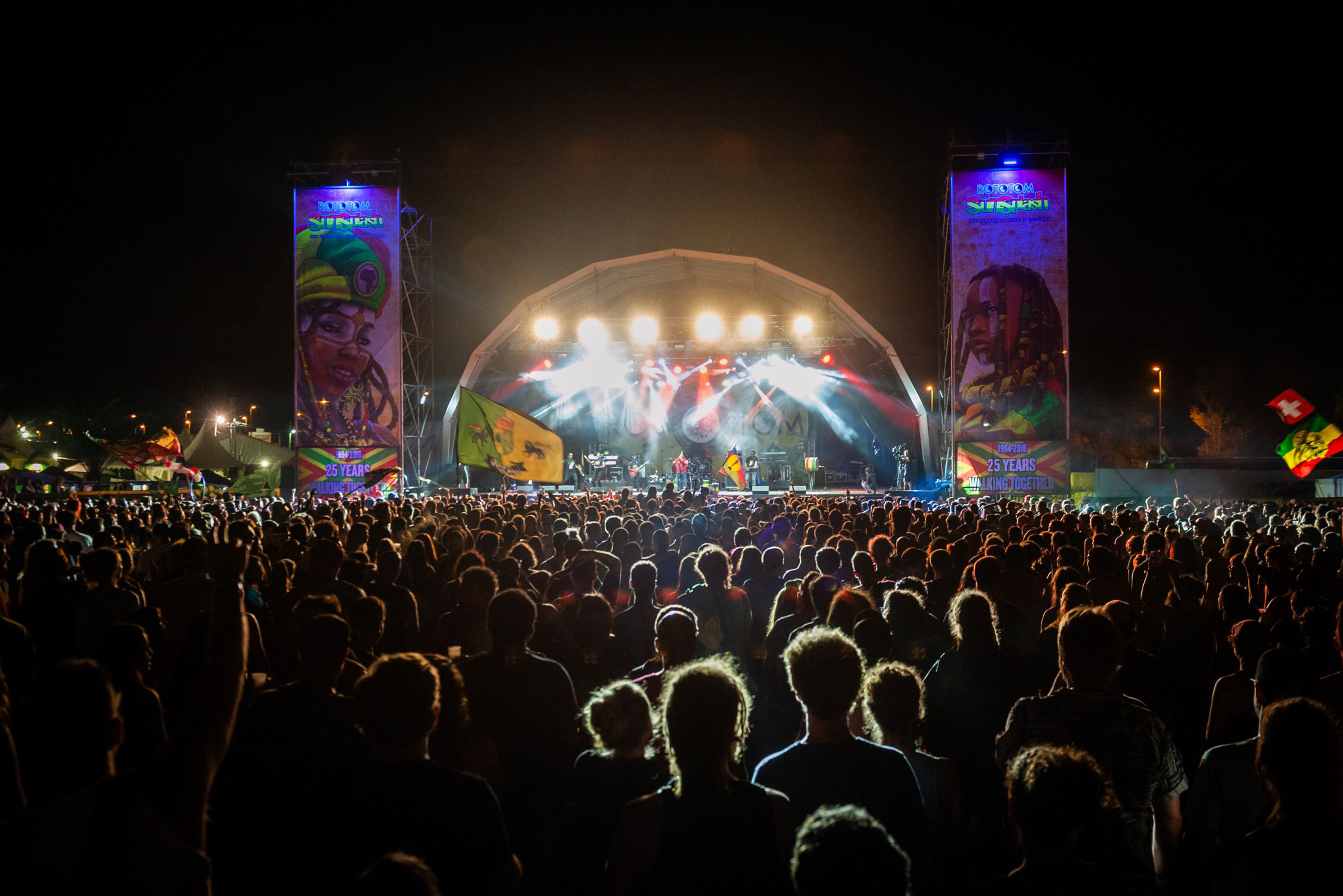
- Rototom Sunsplash 2018 main stage
- Genre: Reggae
- Dates: 16–21 August 2027
- Locations: Benicàssim, Valencian Community, Spain
- Years active: 1994–present
- Founders: Associazione Culturale Rototom
- Attendance: 250,000
- Website: rototomsunsplash.com

Rototom Sunsplash is a large European reggae festival founded in 1994 in Gaio di Spilimbergo (Pordenone, Italy), and since 2010 held in Benicàssim, a few miles north of Valencia, Spain. It attracts thousands of fans from all over the world, thanks to a cultural and musical program that lasts for up to ten days.

== History ==
=== 1991–1999: Rototom Association and the clubs in Gaio and Zoppola ===
The birthplace of the festival is the small Italian town of Gaio di Spilimbergo, province of Pordenone, in the region of Friuli-Venezia Giulia, close to Venice. On 13 December 1991, the Rototom Cultural Association was born and with it a nightclub of the same name. It was an alternative music scene showcasing various styles from punk rock to reggae, indie, and electronic music. The name was taken from the rototom drum, and ascribed to the fact that like the drum, the club creates a variety of sounds. In 1997, the club moved to the municipality of Zoppola in the same province. At this point, the Rototom Club was divided into three rooms, each playing different genres of music: rock, pop, and rap in one; another played reggae and African music; and the last one dedicated to electronic music. Over the next nine years, the club hosted performances by the Ramones (1993), Massive Attack (1998), Bad Religion, NOFX, Suede, and Soulfly; legends like the father of Afrobeat, Fela Kuti, and reggae greats such as Burning Spear, Steel Pulse, Black Uhuru, Inner Circle, U-Roy, Yellowman, Itals, The Meditations, Junior Reid, Linton Kwesi Johnson, Misty in Roots, The Gladiators (band), Pablo Moses, Shaggy (musician), and Buju Banton, among many others.

=== 1994: Rototom Sunsplash is born ===
The Rototom Sunsplash festival was born as a self-financed project at the Rototom club in 1994. The name Sunsplash was taken from what was then the world's biggest reggae event, Reggae Sunsplash, held annually in Jamaica since 1978, and discontinued in 1998.

The event lasted the entire weekend of 2 and 3 July, with a lineup of 14 artists, including Africa Unite, Almamegretta, and Buju Banton. The first edition of the festival attracted a thousand people, mostly musicians and producers. In addition, a dedicated radio station was created, called Radio Rototom.

The second year, the event attracted 3,000 festivalgoers in two days, and the numbers continued to increase during the third and fourth editions. In 1998, the festival relocated to Latisana, due to larger audience numbers and the need for a bigger space.

=== 1998–1999: Latisana ===
In the summer of 1998, unable to accommodate the number of people attending the festival, the organizers decided to move it to Latisana Marittima, in the province of Udine. At this point, Rototom Sunsplash became a proper outdoor festival, with three stages and complementary cultural areas capable of absorbing thousands of attendees. From the previous year's 8,000, audience numbers grew to 20,000 in 1998. The event stretched to four days, with more acts and sideshows than ever before. For the first time, the festival was broadcast internationally via live stream on Italy's Arcoiris TV.

It was also here that the Italian Reggae Awards were first organized. The director of the Jamaican Reggae Sunsplash, Rae Barret, was invited to choose from the best Italian bands at the festival, in order to become the first group to represent Italy at the festival in Jamaica. Reggae National Tickets took the honour that year, and this launched the solo career of Alborosie, the band's vocalist.

=== 2000–2009: Osoppo ===
In the summer of 2000, Rototom Sunsplash moved its headquarters once more, this time to Osoppo. This move was crucial to the festival's growth from an Italian musical celebration to a major European event. Within the 250,000 m^{2} of the Rivellino Park in Osoppo, the festival assumed the dimensions that it retains to the present. The duration of the festival was first extended to eight days, then later nine and finally ten days in total. An average of 150,000 people from around the world converged on this small Italian town for ten consecutive editions. Apart from a greater number of musical stages than ever before, the festival now included numerous side events and workshops, including conferences; capoeira, percussion, and African dance lessons; spaces for meditation; as well as areas with creative workshops for children.

Rototom Sunsplash continued to fund itself solely through ticket sales, with a complete absence of commercial sponsors, and by 2003, almost a decade after its launch, the festival had zero debt.

Beginning in 2006, the festival began to receive criticism as well as some opposition from several Italian politicians after the adoption of the Fini-Giovanardi law, declared unconstitutional in 2014, which, among other things, proposed up to ten years in prison for the use of recreational drugs such as cannabis inside spaces with leisure and cultural activities. The law essentially criminalized the event, to the point that it was forced to move from Italy to Spain. In 2015, the organizers obtained full judicial acquittal on all charges of having permitted drug consumption.

=== 2010–present: Benicàssim ===
In 2010, Rototom Sunsplash moved one more time, to its current location, the beach resort town of Benicàssim in Spain.

After the final event in Osoppo on 12 July 2009, the festival organizers went in search of a new venue. After seven months of touring various regions of Spain, in February 2010, an agreement was reached with the city of Benicàssim, on the eastern coast of the Iberian nation. The extensive camping area made available for the event was key to the decision. The town of less than 20,000 people in the province of Castellón hosted the 17th edition of Rototom Sunsplash, and has been the festival's home to this day.

The number of people attending the newly-relocated event increased with the space, to an average of 230,000 people per edition. The festival was no longer just a European attraction; fans from all over the world were attending, and the Spanish-speaking venue was especially a draw for reggae aficionados from Latin-American countries. Another major selling point for the festival was its new beach location, providing a sharp contrast to its previous Alpine setting, which was usually colder and often windy and rainy.

== Criticism and controversy ==
- Berliner Zeitung has criticized the fact that the festival offers, apart from its musical attractions, a questionable cultural program with a "crude mixture of enthusiasm for Africa, anti-imperialism, and esotericism". For example, a discussion on the dangers of chemtrails has been listed on the festival's "social forum".
- In August 2015, the festival took the political stance of disinviting the American reggae artist Matisyahu after he refused to state his personal opinion regarding the proposed two-state solution to the Israeli–Palestinian conflict. Matisyahu is not Israeli, but he is Jewish. The artist stated that he never includes his own political views in his shows, and he declined to clarify his previous statements on the topic. It was also reported that other musicians threatened to cancel their performances unless Matisyahu made a declaration supporting Palestinian statehood. Many human rights groups and the Spanish government suggested that the banning had anti-Semitic overtones. The Spanish foreign minister said: "Imposing a public declaration (from Matisyahu), puts into question the principle of non-discrimination on which all plural and diverse societies are based". The concert had also included singer Capleton, whose lyrics call for the murder of gays and lesbians, and who had not been disinvited. After strong reactions from various critics and accusations of anti-Semitism, Rototom Sunsplash admitted that cancelling Matisyahu's performance had been the wrong decision. The artist was then reinvited to the festival. In an official statement issued on their web page, Rototom Sunplash said: "Rototom Sunsplash rejects anti-Semitism and any form of discrimination towards the Jewish community; we respect both their culture and religious beliefs and we sincerely apologize for what has occurred". During his set, Matisyahu performed the song "Jerusalem", while several pro-Palestinian activists waved Palestinian flags and heckled him.
- Within the context of the Matisyahu controversy, Jungle World pointed out the irony that "in a festival with a strong focus on human rights", the violent, homophobic lyrics of Capleton have not been called out by anyone.

== Gallery ==
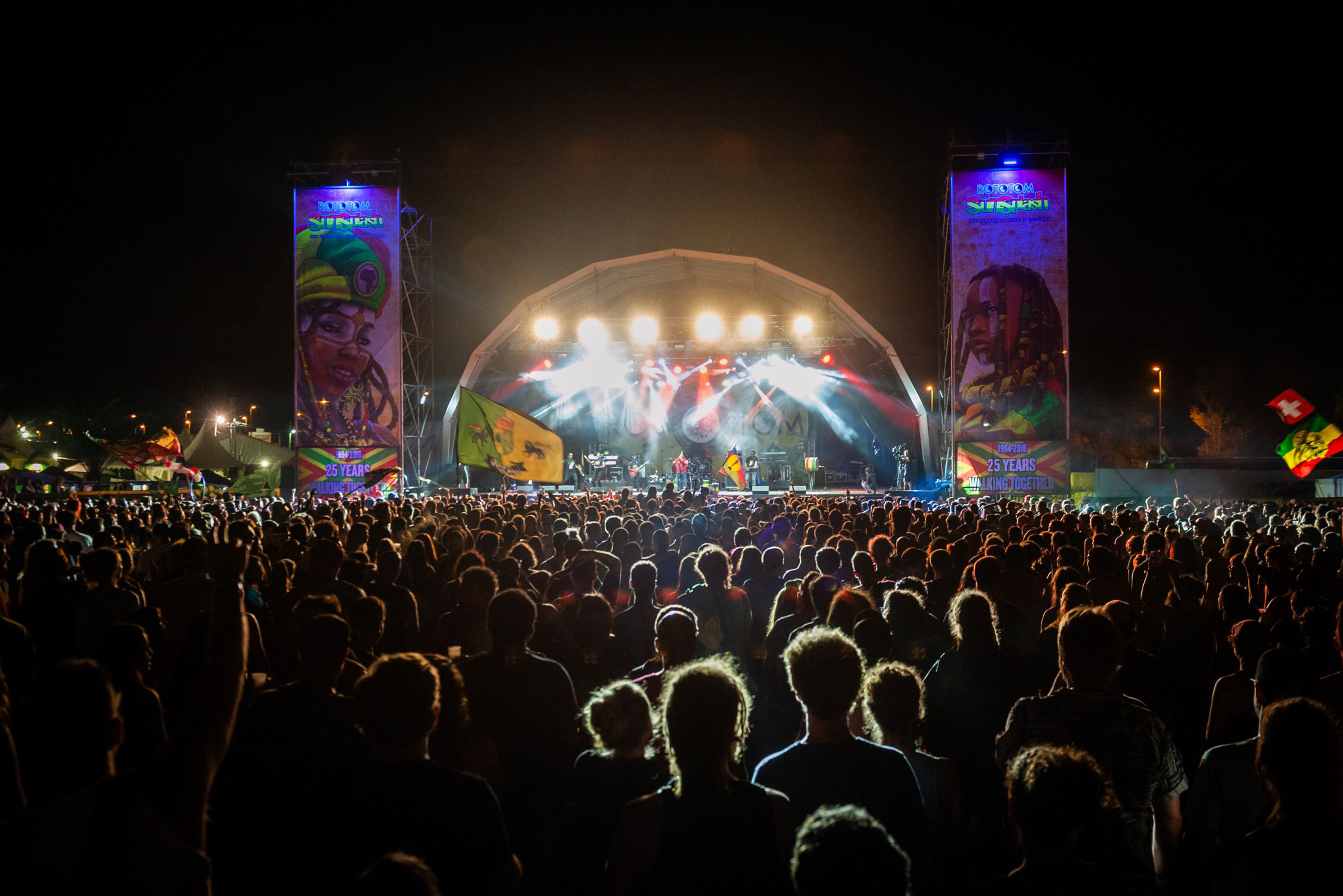
Rototom Main Stage

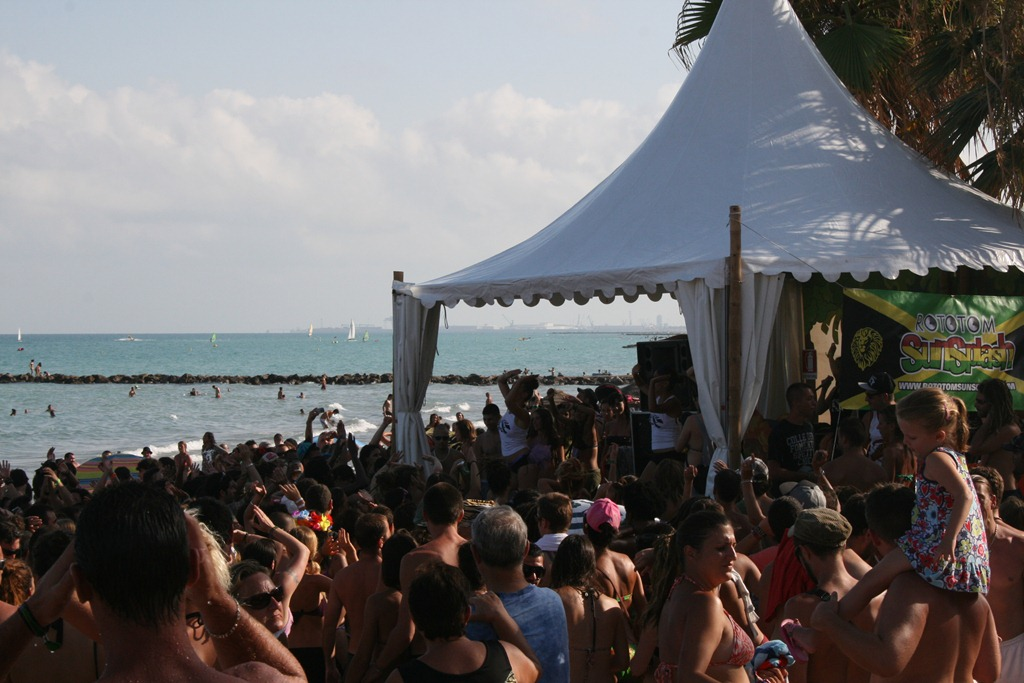
Rototom Sunbeach

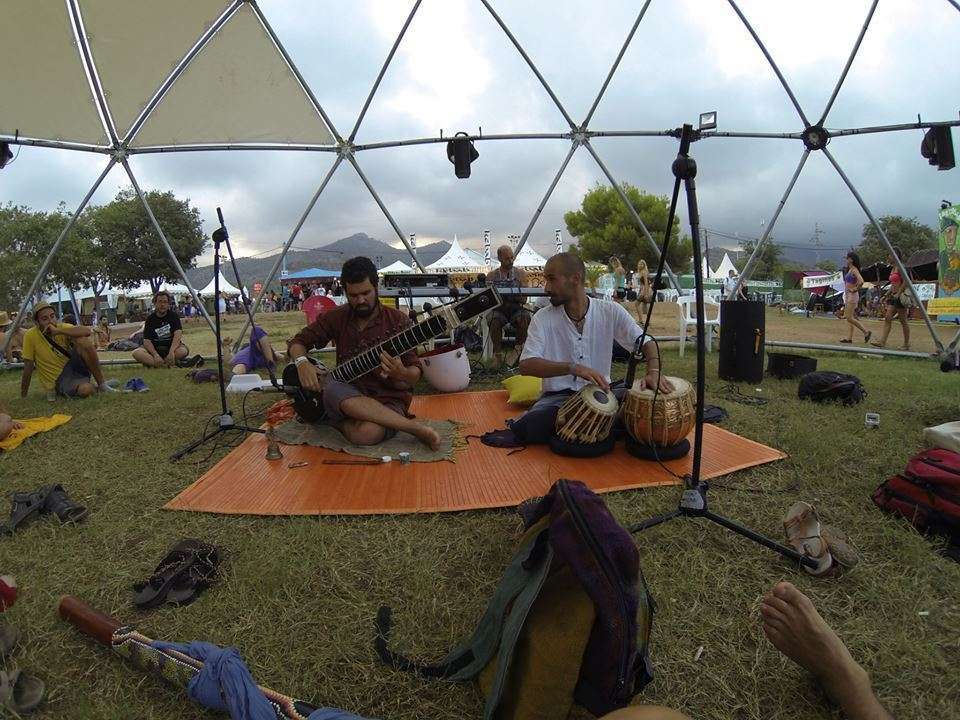
Rototom Pachamama

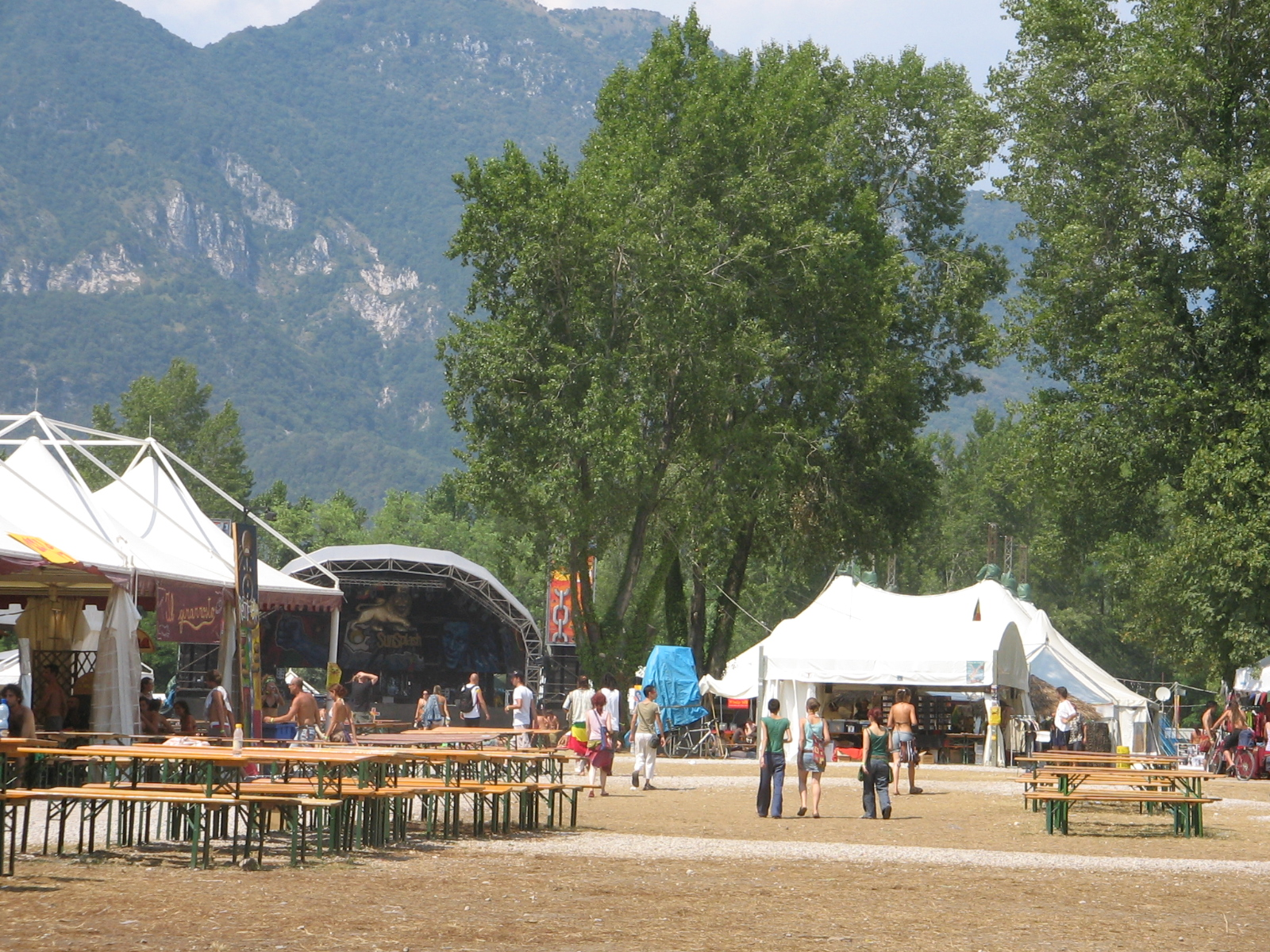
Rototom at Osoppo

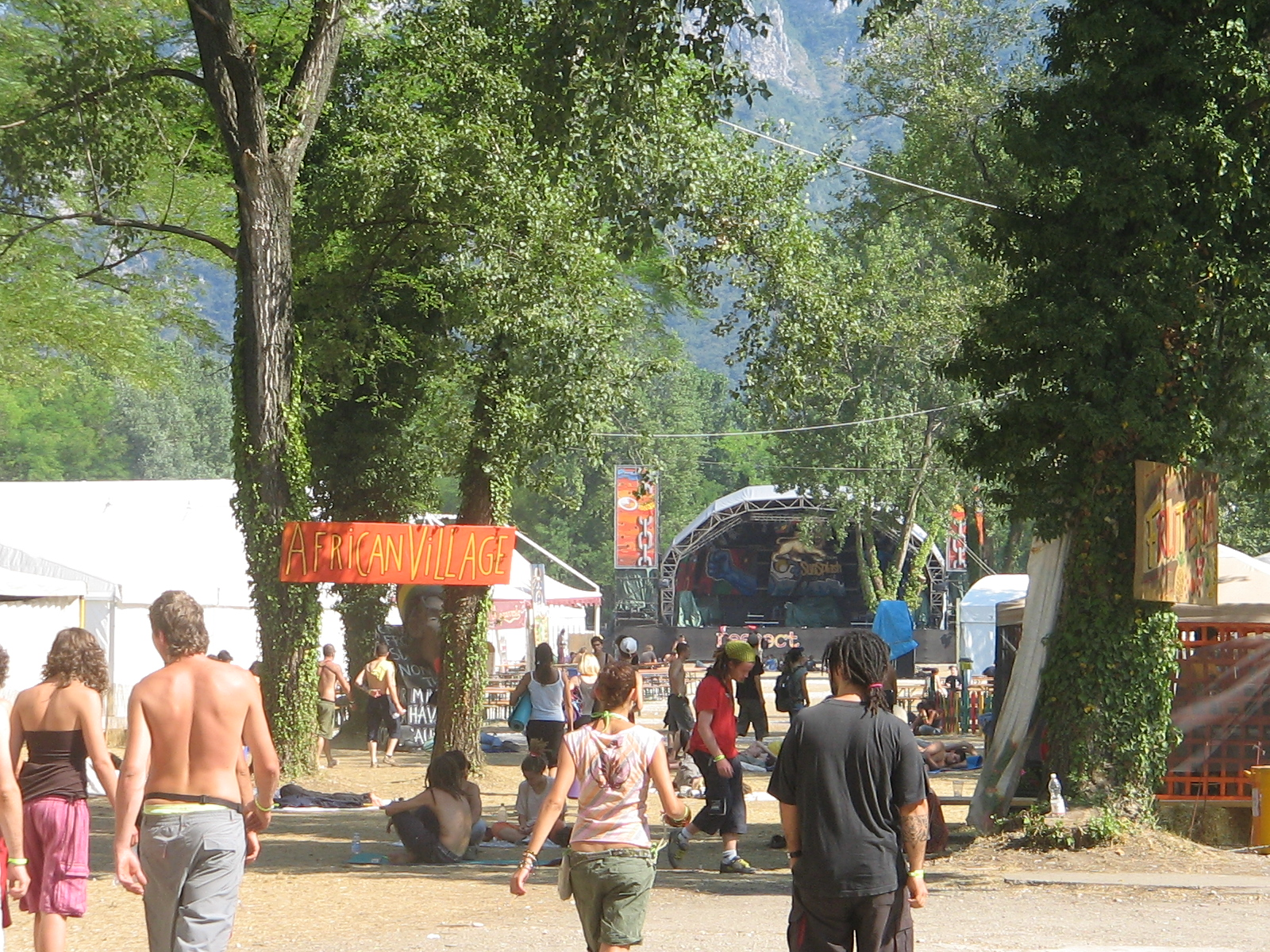
Rototom at Osoppo

== See also ==
- List of reggae festivals
