= Johnny Matson =

American psychologist

- Born: Johnny Lee Matson; June 23, 1951 (age 75); Watseka, Illinois, U.S.
- Education: Eastern Illinois University, Indiana State University
- Spouse: Yes
- Children: Two
- Scientific career
- Fields: Child psychology
- Workplaces: Louisiana State University
- Thesis: A study of positive practice overcorrection versus time-out for eliminating the classroom disruptions of relatively normal children (1976)

Johnny Lee Matson is a former professor in the Department of Psychology at Louisiana State University recognized for his work in the social sciences. Matson's research topics were development, assessment and treatment of co-morbid conditions in developmental intellectual disabilities, including autism spectrum disorders. Matson's high number of self publications, self citations, and peer review practices have been questioned by social scientists. In 2023 it was reported that Matson had 24 of his research papers retracted due to scientific misconduct.

== Background and research career ==
Matson was born on June 23, 1951, in Watseka, Illinois. He received a Bachelor of Science degree in Psychology and Biology, and a Master of Science degree in Counseling Psychology from Eastern Illinois University. Matson received a Ph.D. in Psychology from Indiana State University in 1976 and completed his internship in Clinical Psychology at Central Louisiana State Hospital. Matson was an assistant professor of child psychiatry and psychology at University of Pittsburgh from 1978 through 1981, associate professor and professor in the Department of Learning, Developmental and Special Education at Northern Illinois University, and starting in 1985 a professor in the Department of Psychology at Louisiana State University.

Matson's research career focused upon the assessment and treatment and functioning of people with intellectual disabilities and autism spectrum disorders, including psychotropic medication side effects, social skills of children and adults, psychopathology, symptoms of autism spectrum disorders, problem behavior, behavioral function, and feeding problems. Matson supported the use of indirect assessment measures to assess symptoms, side-effects, and treatment progress. Matson participated in the development of the Psychopathology Inventory for Mentally Retarded Adults (PIMRA) and the Questions About Behavior Function (QABF) measure. Matson is also the co-developer of the Functional Assessment for Multiple Causality (FACT) measure, which has been found to have superior psychometric properties to the QABF, when a given behavior is reinforced by multiple factors.

== Scientific misconduct ==
Since 2015 researchers have raised concern about Matson's high number of self publications and self citations. His peer review practices as a journal editor have also been questioned. In 2023 Matson had 24 of his research publications retracted, with the original journal publisher citing undisclosed conflicts of interest, duplicated methodology and a compromised peer-review process as reasons for the retractions. Matson responded by writing, "This only applies to a small handful of articles [and] there is no rule about self-citations."

== See also ==
- Questions About Behavior Function
- Scientific misconduct
- List of scientific misconduct incidents
