= Africa Unite (band) =

Italian reggae band

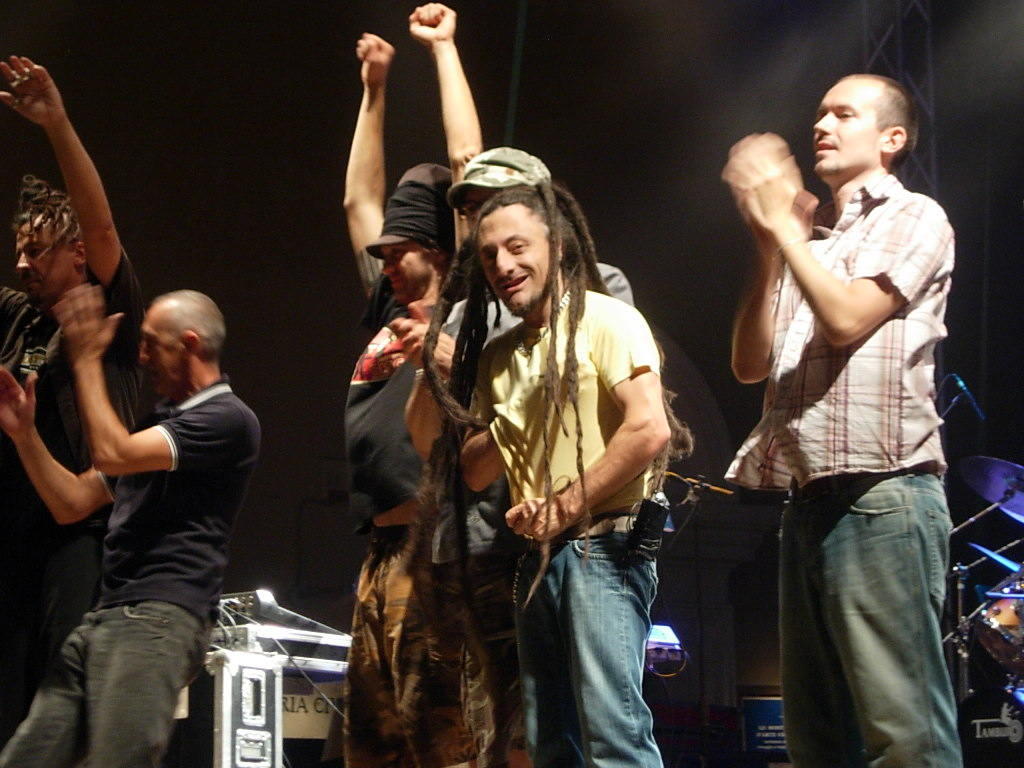
Africa Unite in 2007

Africa Unite is an Italian reggae band, active since 1981.

== Career ==
The band was founded as Africa United in 1981 in Pinerolo by Vitale Bonino (born 1964) aka Bunna and Francesco Caudullo (born 1965) aka Madaski, on the occasion of a tribute concert for the recently deceased Bob Marley. In 1987, they made their recording debut with the self-produced album Mjekrari. In 1992, they adopted their current name, and started the hip hop side project To.sse. In 1993, they released their first work in Italian language, Babilonia e poesia. Their 1995 album Il sole che brucia marked their mainstream breakout, while their 1996 live album In diretta dal sole was their first work for a major (PolyGram). In the second half of the 1990s, Madaski launched a solo side project, while Bunna started collaboraing with Giuliano Palma & the Bluebeaters. After Vibra (2000), in 2003, they returned to self-produce their works.

== Style ==
Ernesto Assante described Africa Unite's style as "a direct offshoot of 1980s British reggae, stemming from that blend of roots reggae and pop". Enrico De Regibus noted a clear and constant influence of Bob Marley, fused with "Mediterranean elements, and distinctly indigenous ones, which gradually lend a more personal touch to the poetic style of the ensemble".

== Discography ==
Album

- 1987 – Mjekrari (EP)
- 1988 – Llaka! (EP)
- 1991 – People Pie
- 1992 - Cantè (EP)
- 1993 – Babilonia e poesia
- 1995 – Un sole che brucia
- 1997 – Il gioco
- 2000 – Vibra
- 2001 – 20
- 2003 – Mentre fuori piove
- 2006 – Controlli
- 2010 – Rootz
- 2015 – Il punto di partenza
- 2019 – In tempo reale (with Architorti)
- 2022 – Non è fortuna
