= List of reggae musicians =

This is a list of reggae musicians. This includes artists who have either been critical to the genre or have had a considerable amount of exposure (such as in the case of one that has been on a major label). Bands are listed by the first letter in their name (not including the words "a", "an", or "the"), and individuals are listed by last name.

== A ==
- The Abyssinians
- The Aces
- Glen Adams
- Bryan Art (formerly known as, Brah Yhan, or Brayhan Art)
- Admiral T
- Yasus Afari
- African Brothers
- The Aggrovators
- Aidonia
- Aisha
- Bobby Aitken
- Laurel Aitken
- Alaine
- Alpha Blondy
- Alborosie
- Dennis Alcapone
- Alkaline
- Alozade
- Alpha & Omega
- Roland Alphonso
- Althea & Donna
- Al Anderson
- Lynford Anderson (a.k.a. "Andy Capp")
- Bob Andy
- Horace Andy
- Mike Anthony
- Patrick Andy
- Anthony B
- Apache Indian
- De Apostle
- Arise Roots
- Marlon Asher
- Aswad
- Audio Active

== B ==
- Baba Brooks
- Baby Cham
- Baby Wayne
- Ballyhoo!
- Billy Boyo
- Bad Brains
- Admiral Bailey
- Spanner Banner
- Buju Banton
- Burro Banton
- Mega Banton
- Pato Banton
- Starkey Banton
- Dave Barker
- Lloyd Barnes
- Aston Barrett
- Carlton Barrett
- Theophilus Beckford
- Bedouin Soundclash
- Beenie Man
- Nayanka Bell
- Lorna Bennett
- Spragga Benz
- Beshara
- Big Joe
- Big Mountain
- Big Youth
- Barry Biggs
- Black Roots
- The Black Seeds
- Black Slate
- The Blackstones
- Black Uhuru
- Everton Blender
- Alpha Blondy
- Blue Riddim Band
- The Blues Busters
- Yami Bolo
- Usain Bolt
- Bongo Herman
- Barry Boom
- Ken Boothe
- Born Jamericans
- Bounty Killer
- Dennis Bovell (a.k.a. Blackbeard)
- Andru Branch
- Brick & Lace
- Annette Brissett
- Peter Broggs
- Cedric Brooks
- Mike Brooks
- Barry Brown
- Dennis Brown
- Foxy Brown
- Glen Brown
- Junior Brown
- Prezident Brown
- U Brown
- Bob Marley
- Buccaneer
- Bumpin Uglies
- Burning Spear
- Bushman
- Busy Signal
- Junior Byles

== C ==
- The Cables
- Susan Cadogan
- Al Campbell
- Cornell Campbell
- Don Campbell
- Icho Candy
- Capleton
- Captain Sinbad
- Don Carlos
- Carlton and The Shoes
- Lacksley Castell
- Chalice
- The Chantells
- Charlie Chaplin
- Charly B
- Lloyd Charmers
- Tessanne Chin
- Tony Chin
- The Chosen Few
- Christafari
- Chronixx
- Geoffrey Chung
- Mikey Chung
- Tami Chynn
- Cidade Negra
- The Cimarons
- The Clarendonians
- Augustus "Gussie" Clarke
- Johnny Clarke
- Jimmy Cliff
- Cocoa Tea
- Stranger Cole
- Collie Buddz
- Ansell Collins
- Common Kings
- The Congos
- Hollie Cook
- Joseph Cotton
- Count Ossie
- Tommy Cowan
- Culcha Candela
- Cultura Profética
- Culture
- Yvonne Curtis

== D ==
- Daab
- Danny Red
- Daddy Freddy
- Daddy Screw
- Tonton David
- Digga D
- Ronnie Davis
- Nora Dean
- Desmond Dekker
- Del Arno Band
- Junior Delgado
- Deliman
- Chaka Demus & Pliers
- Dillinger
- Phyllis Dillon
- Dirty Heads
- Dobby Dobson
- Eric Donaldson
- Dr Alimantado
- Tyrone Downie
- The Drastics
- Mikey Dread
- Don Drummond
- Dry & Heavy
- Dub FX
- Dub Inc.
- Dubmatix
- Lucky Dube
- Sly Dunbar
- Errol Dunkley
- The Dynamites

== E ==
- Earl Flute
- Earl Sixteen
- Echo Movement
- Clint Eastwood
- Clint Eastwood & General Saint
- Easy Star All*Stars
- Clancy Eccles
- Jackie Edwards
- Rupie Edwards
- Eek-A-Mouse
- Elephant Man
- El General
- Alton Ellis
- Hortense Ellis
- The Elovaters
- Junior English
- The Ethiopians
- Etana
- The Expanders
- The Expendables

== F ==
- Jermaine Fagan
- Tiken Jah Fakoly
- Fantan Mojah
- Majek Fashek
- Father Goose Music
- Fathead
- Benjamin Faya
- Clinton Fearon
- Chuck Fenda
- Robert Ffrench
- Edi Fitzroy
- Sharon Forrester
- Fortunate Youth
- Michael Franti & Spearhead
- Dean Fraser
- Lutan Fyah

== G ==
- Boris Gardiner
- Gaudi
- The Gaylads
- General Echo
- General Levy
- General Trees
- Gentleman
- Sophia George
- Giant Panda Guerilla Dub Squad
- The Gladiators
- Deborahe Glasgow
- Edson Gomes
- Vin Gordon
- Eddy Grant
- Rudy Grant
- Owen Gray
- The Green
- Winston Grennan
- Greyhound
- Marcia Griffiths
- Winston Groovy
- Groundation
- Gyptian

== H ==
- Haha
- Half Pint
- Audrey Hall
- Beres Hammond
- Derrick Harriott
- Josh Heinrichs
- The Heptones
- Herbs
- Lennie Hibbert
- Joe Higgs
- Joseph Hill
- Justin Hinds
- The Hippy Boys
- Errol Holt
- John Holt
- Honey Boy
- Keith Hudson
- Peter Hunnigale
- Clive Hunt
- Sheila Hylton

== I ==
- Ijahman Levi
- Inner Circle
- I-Octane
- I-Roy
- Ismaël Isaac
- I-Threes
- The In Crowd
- Iration
- Irie Maffia
- Tippa Irie
- Welton Irie
- Devon Irons
- Gregory Isaacs
- Israel Vibration
- The Itals
- I-Wayne
- Iya Terra

== J ==
- Jah Cure
- Jah Lion a.k.a. Jah Lloyd
- Jah Mason
- Jah Roots
- Jah Shaka
- Jah Stitch
- Jah Woosh
- Jah Warrior
- David Jahson
- Winston Jarrett
- J.O.E.
- John Brown's Body
- Lyndon John X
- Anthony Johnson
- Linton Kwesi Johnson
- Vivian Jones
- Judge Dread
- J Boog

== K ==
- K2R Riddim
- Katchafire
- Kalaeloa
- Israel Kamakawiwoʻole
- Janet Kay
- Ini Kamoze
- Junior Kelly
- Pat Kelly
- Kiddus I
- Diana King
- Jigsy King
- King Django
- King Sounds
- King Stitt
- King Tubby
- Sean Kingston
- Knowledge
- Konshens
- Kranium

== L ==
- L.A.B.
- Lady G
- Lady Saw
- Eric "Bingy Bunny" Lamont
- Byron Lee
- Phillip Leo
- Exco Levi
- Barrington Levy
- Hopeton Lewis
- Aura Lewis
- Lieutenant Stitchie
- Little Hero
- Little John
- Little Kevin
- Little Roy
- Dandy Livingstone
- Jah Lloyd
- Fred Locks
- Locomondo
- June Lodge
- Jimmy London
- Lone Ranger
- Long Beach Dub All-Stars
- Long Beach Shortbus
- Loose Caboose
- Luciano

== M ==
- Macka B
- Maxi Priest
- Mad Cobra
- David Madden
- Mad Lion
- Mad Professor
- Mafia & Fluxy
- Magic!
- Carl Malcolm
- Bob Marley
- Damian "Junior Gong" Marley
- Julian Marley
- Ky-Mani Marley
- Rita Marley
- Stephen Marley
- YG Marley
- Ziggy Marley
- Steven "Lenky" Marsden
- Larry Marshall
- Wayne Marshall
- Junior Marvin
- Jah Mason
- Massilia Sound System
- Massive Dread
- Matisyahu
- Matumbi
- Mavado
- The Maytals
- The Maytones
- Tommy McCook
- Freddie McGregor
- Freddie McKay
- Bitty McLean
- Enos McLeod
- The Meditations
- The Melodians
- Mellow Mood
- Merger
- Meta & The Cornerstones
- Peter Metro
- The Mexicano
- Me & You
- Michigan & Smiley
- Midnite
- The Mighty Diamonds
- Mighty Mystic
- Mikey Dread
- Jacob Miller
- Millie
- Sugar Minott
- Mishka
- Misty in Roots
- Jackie Mittoo
- Mo'Kalamity
- Derrick Morgan
- Morgan Heritage
- The Morwells
- Pablo Moses
- Judy Mowatt
- The Movement
- Mr. Vegas
- Hugh Mundell
- Junior Murvin
- Mungo's Hi Fi
- Musical Youth
- Mutabaruka
- Cedric Myton

== N ==
- Fidel Nadal
- Nando Boom
- Johnny Nash
- Natty Nation
- Natural Vibrations ("Natty Vibes")
- Natiruts
- Natural Black
- New Kingston
- Nicodemus
- Ninjaman
- Nitty Gritty
- George Nooks
- No-Maddz

== O ==
- Oku Onuora
- Opihi Pickers
- Jackie Opel
- O Rappa
- Original Koffee
- O-Shen
- Johnny Osbourne

== P ==
- Augustus Pablo
- Triston Palma
- Pan Head
- Papa Dee
- Papa San
- The Paragons
- Ken Parker
- Lloyd Parks
- Passafire
- Patra
- Frankie Paul
- Sean Paul
- Dawn Penn
- Pepper
- Lee "Scratch" Perry
- Pinchers
- Dwight Pinkney
- The Pioneers
- Pliers
- Jukka Poika
- Popcaan
- Pressure Buss Pipe
- Maxi Priest
- Prince Allah
- Prince Buster
- Prince Far I
- Prince Jazzbo
- Prince Lincoln Thompson
- Prince Mohammed
- Professor Nuts
- Michael Prophet
- Protoje
- Kabaka Pyramid
- The Pyramids

== Q ==
- Finley Quaye
- Queen Ifrica
- Queen Omega

== R ==
- Raappana
- Ernest Ranglin
- Ranking Dread
- Ranking Joe
- Ranking Roger
- Ranking Trevor
- Cutty Ranks
- Gappy Ranks
- Shabba Ranks
- The Rastafarians
- RAS-1
- Ras Michael
- Ras Midas
- Ras Mohammed
- Ras Shiloh
- Rayvon
- Tony Rebel
- Rebelution
- Red Dragon
- Red Rat
- Winston Reedy
- Junior Reid
- The Revolutionaries
- Rhythm & Sound
- Cynthia Richards
- Jimmy Riley
- Tarrus Riley
- Winston Riley
- Johnny Ringo
- Rico Rodriguez
- Max Romeo
- Gene Rondo
- The Roots Radics
- Levi Roots
- Michael Rose
- Jesse Royal
- The Royals
- The Rudies
- Bruce Ruffin
- Devon Russell

== S ==
- Natasja Saad
- Sams'K Le Jah
- Sanchez
- Steven Seagal
- Stevie Face
- Scientist
- Errol Scorcher
- Scotty
- Screwdriver
- B.B. Seaton
- Seeed
- The Selecter
- Serani
- Sevana
- Shaggy
- Shalom
- Bim Sherman
- Pluto Shervington
- Shinehead
- Roy Shirley
- Shrub
- Garnett Silk
- The Silvertones
- Sister Carol
- Sister Nancy
- Sizzla.
- The Slackers
- Slightly Stoopid
- The Slickers
- Sly and Robbie
- Leroy Smart
- Smiley Culture
- Earl "Chinna" Smith
- Ernie Smith
- Mikey Smith
- Slim Smith
- Wayne Smith
- Snoop Lion
- Snow
- SOJA
- Soul Syndicate
- Soul Rebels Brass Band
- The Specials
- Spectacular
- Spice
- Mikey Spice
- Richie Spice
- Steel Pulse
- Steely & Clevie
- Richie Stephens
- Tanya Stephens
- Duane Stephenson
- Lester Sterling
- Roman Stewart
- Tinga Stewart
- Stick Figure
- Sublime
- Super Cat
- Symarip

== T ==
- 311
- Lynn Taitt
- The Tamlins
- Rod Taylor
- The Techniques
- The Tennors
- Thievery Corporation
- Tenor Saw
- Tiger
- Third World
- Jah Thomas
- Nicky Thomas
- Caroll Thompson
- Kemar Thompson (a.k.a. "Noncowa" and "Jr. Pinchers")
- Lincoln Thompson
- Linval Thompson
- Eddie Thornton (a.k.a. "Tan Tan")
- Thriller U
- Through The Roots
- T.O.K.
- Tomorrows Bad Seeds
- Toots & the Maytals
- Andrew Tosh
- Peter Tosh
- Toyan
- Tradition
- Tribal Seeds
- Tribo de Jah
- Trinity
- Tropical Depression
- Tropidelic
- Twenty One Pilots
- Junior Tucker
- Twinkle Brothers

== U ==
- UB40
- The Uniques
- Unity Pacific
- The Upsetters
- U-Roy

== V ==
- Vavamuffin
- Vibronics
- The Viceroys
- Romain Virgo
- Voice Mail
- Vybz Kartel

== W ==
- Wayne Wade
- Bunny Wailer
- The Wailers (Bob Marley & The Wailers)
- The Wailing Souls
- Josey Wales
- Leroy Wallace
- Ward 21
- Warrior King
- E.T. Webster
- Caron Wheeler
- Worl-A-Girl
- Willi Williams
- Delroy Wilson
- Wingless Angels
- Wayne Wonder
- Word, Sound and Power
- Winston Wright

== Y ==
- Yabby You
- Yaadcore
- Yellowman

== Z ==
- Zap Pow
- Benjamin Zephaniah
- Earl Zero
- Zion Train
- Zox
- Tapper Zukie

== See also ==
- Lists of musicians
