= List of roots reggae artists =

This is a list of notable roots reggae musicians, singers and producers.

== A ==
- The Abyssinians
- Laurel Aitken
- Alborosie
- Alpha & Omega
- Roland Alphonso
- Althea & Donna
- Bob Andy
- Horace Andy
- Anthony B
- Antidoping
- Bryan Art
- Aswad
- Alpha Blondy

== B ==
- Macka B
- Boris Gardiner
- Buju Banton
- Beshara
- Big Mountain
- Big Youth
- Black Uhuru
- Black Roots
- Black Slate
- Everton Blender
- Alpha Blondy
- Yami Bolo
- Ken Boothe
- Peter Broggs
- Mike Brooks
- Barry Brown
- Dennis Brown
- Burning Spear
- Bushman

== C ==
- Al Campbell
- Icho Candy
- Capleton
- Don Carlos
- Lacksley Castell
- Charly B
- Chezidek
- Chronixx
- Johnny Clarke
- Jimmy Cliff
- Cocoa Tea
- The Congos
- Count Ossie
- Cultura Profética
- Culture

== D ==
- Ronnie Davis
- Del Arno Band
- Ossie Dellimore
- Desmond Dekker
- Dezarie
- Dillinger
- Dr Alimantado
- Eric Donaldson
- Mikey Dread
- Dry & Heavy
- Lucky Dube

== E ==
- Earl Sixteen
- Eek a mouse
- Alton Ellis
- The Ethiopians
- The Elovaters

== F ==
- Majek Fashek
- Clinton Fearon

== G ==
- Gentleman
- The Gladiators
- Gondwana
- Marcia Griffiths
- Groundation
- Gyptian

== H ==
- Half Pint
- Pam Hall
- Beres Hammond
- The Heptones
- Joe Higgs
- Errol Holt
- John Holt
- Hornsman Coyote singer of Eyesburn

== I ==
- I-Roy
- I-Wayne
- Gregory Isaacs
- Israel Vibration
- The Itals

== J ==
- Jah Cure
- Jah Roots
- Jah Shaka
- John Brown's Body
- Anthony Johnson
- Roydel Johnson

== K ==
- Ini Kamoze
- Katchafire
- Junior Kelly
- King Tubby
- Kiddus I
- Knowledge

== L ==
- Eric "Bingy Bunny" Lamont
- Ijahman Levi
- Barrington Levy
- Aura Lewis
- Little Roy
- Jah Lloyd
- Fred Locks
- Jimmy London
- Loose Caboose
- Luciano

== M ==
- Meta & The Cornerstones
- David Madden
- Bob Marley
- Bob Marley & the Wailers
- Rita Marley
- Damian Marley
- Julian Marley
- Ky-Mani Marley
- Stephen Marley
- Ziggy Marley
- Skip Marley
- Junior Marvin
- Jah Mason
- The Maytones
- Winston McAnuff
- Freddie McGregor
- Freddie McKay
- Me & You
- The Meditations
- The Melodians
- Peter Metro
- Midnite
- The Mighty Diamonds
- Mighty Mystic
- Jacob Miller
- Sugar Minott
- Misty in Roots
- Jackie Mittoo
- Fantan Mojah
- Mo'Kalamity
- Morgan Heritage
- The Morwells
- Pablo Moses
- Judy Mowatt
- Hugh Mundell
- Junior Murvin
- Mutabaruka
- Cedric Myton
- Mikey Dread

== N ==
- Nasio Fontaine
- New Kingston
- No-Maddz

== O ==
- Johnny Osbourne

== P ==
- Addis Pablo
- Augustus Pablo
- Frankie Paul
- Perfect
- Lee Scratch Perry
- Pressure
- Prince Alla
- Prince Far I
- Michael Prophet
- Protoje

== Q ==
- Queen Ifrica
- Queen Omega

== R ==
- The Rastafarians
- Tony Rebel
- Danny Red
- Junior Reid
- Rhythm & Sound
- Jimmy Riley
- Tarrus Riley
- Max Romeo
- Roots Radics
- Michael Rose
- Jesse Royal
- The Royals
- Devon Russell
- Richie Spice

== S ==
- Sanchez
- Scientist
- Garnett Silk
- The Silvertones
- Sister Carol
- Sizzla
- The Skatalites
- The Skints
- Sly & Robbie
- Leroy Smart
- Smiley Culture
- SOJA
- Richie Spice
- Steel Pulse

== T ==
- Judah Eskender Tafari
- Rod Taylor
- Tenor Saw
- Third World
- Lincoln Thompson
- Linval Thompson
- Toots & the Maytals
- Peter Tosh
- Tribal Seeds
- Turbulence
- Twinkle Brothers

== U ==
- U-Roy
- The Upsetters
- The Viceroys

== W ==
- Bunny Wailer
- The Wailers Band
- The Wailing Souls

== Y ==
- Yabby You

== Z ==
- Zap Pow
