= The Disciples (band) =

- Genres: Roots reggae, dub
- Occupation: Musician
- Years active: 1986 to present
- Labels: Vladimir The Great (since 1993); Backyard Movements (since 1996)
- Members: Russ D. Bell-Brown
- Past members: Lol Bell-Brown
- Website: Official website site down

The Disciples are a dub roots reggae group that was formed in 1986 by brothers Russ D. and Lol Bell-Brown, named by Jah Shaka after providing Discomix Dubplates for his sound system. They recorded four albums of instrumental dub for Jah Shaka's King Of The Zulu Tribe label during 1987 to 1990.

Russ D. acquired some basic recording equipment in 1985 which started their productions. Over the years this has seen many changes moving from a bedroom with four- and eight track recording to a small purpose built studio which now comprises full 24 track recording and mixing facilities.

The Disciples built their own sound system in 1991 and played events across the UK for the following five years. They played alongside Aba Shanti-I, Iration Steppas and Channel One Sound System. Musical content was strictly roots reggae and dub music from all eras.

Their first label, Boom Shacka Lacka, was formed in 1993 for releasing heavyweight instrumental dubs and this included a release of discomix Prowling Lion. They also produced another album, For Those Who Understand. During this time their tracks featured on compilations for labels such as Virgin (Macrodub series), Dope On Plastic, Zip Dog and Dubhead. Further albums were released with artists such as Rootsman, Dayjah and Sister Rasheda.

In 1996, they formed their second label, Backyard Movements, as a vehicle for producing roots reggae discomix vocal and dub releases. The label has seen works with both homegrown and Jamaican artists including Prince Alla, Sister Rasheda ( who had previously recorded for Augustus Pablo's Rockers International and Message labels ), Michael Rose, Yami Bolo, Bunny Lie Lie, Lutan Fyah, Prince Malachi, Tony Roots, Danny Vibes, Michael Prophet, Johnny Clarke, Christine Miller, Vivian Jones (singer), Ras Mac Bean, Zion Train and David Ruffy of The Ruts ( under the moniker Powersteppers), Luciano (singer), Alpha & Omega (band), Leroy Smart, High Priest, Anthony Que and others.

Since 1996, the Disciples sound system was dissolved and brother Lol pulled out of the recording business, going on to work for Dub Vendor. Russ D. continued with both the label and DJing, teaming up with long-time friend, mic chanter and percussionist Jonah Dan.

The works continue in the Disciples Backyard Studio for their own productions and other labels. In 2005, Russ Disciple released the Discomix Rootsman with foundation Toaster U-Roy, co-produced with François Kevorkian.
