= Leonard E. Barrett =

Jamaican-American professor

Leonard E. Barrett Senior (1920 in Saint Elizabeth, Jamaica – June 3, 2007 in Cheltenham, Pennsylvania) was a Jamaican-American professor of religion and anthropology known for his foundational works on Rastafari.

== Biography ==
Leonard E. Barrett Senior was born in Jamaica in 1920. He was ordained as a Methodist minister, then migrated to the United States during the 1940s. He received a bachelor's degree from Albright College, then was the pastor of an evangelical church in Pennsylvania. He received a master's of divinity from United Theological Seminary in 1961, a master's degree in history in 1962 and a doctorate in comparative religion and anthropology in 1967 from Temple University.

His dissertation, completed at Temple University, was published as The Rastafarians: a study of Messianic cultism in Jamaica in 1969. His book Soul-Force: African Heritage in Afro-American Religion was a finalist for the National Book Award for Philosophy And Religion in 1975. His book The Rastafarians: the Dreadlocks of Jamaica was reviewed favorably in the 1970s by academics, and has become one of the standard anthropological examinations of the religious movement. It was republished on its twentieth anniversary in 1997. He released numerous writings on different aspects of religious and spiritual life in Jamaica. Barrett made contributions to reference texts in the field of religion.

Barrett was a professor at Temple University. He taught at colleges in Jamaica, Connecticut, and Puerto Rico.

== Awards and honors ==
In 1983, he was awarded the Alumni Citation Award from Albright College.

Barrett's accomplishments throughout his life inspired one of his sons, Terry Lee Barrett, to write a semi-autobiographical novel based on the stories his father told him about Jamaican religion and spirituality.

== Works ==
- The Rastafarians: a study of Messianic cultism in Jamaica, Caribbean monograph series, no. 6. (Puerto Rico: University of Puerto Rico, Institute of Caribbean Studies, 1969).
- Soul-Force: African Heritage in Afro-American Religion, C. Eric Lincoln Series on Black Religion (New York: Anchor Press, 1974).
- The Rastafarians: the Dreadlocks of Jamaica (Kingston, Jamaica: Sangster's Book Stores, 1977). OCLC 932266388
  - Reprinted in 1978, 1979, 1981, 1982.
  - A revised and updated edition titled The Rastafarians: the Sounds of Cultural Difference was published in 1988 that included new research and a new afterword.
  - It was also republished in a 20th anniversary edition in 1997, titled The Rastafarians; this was republished in 2014.
  - It was also translated into Japanese in 1996.
- The Sun and the Drum: African Roots in Jamaican Folk Tradition (Kingston, Jamaica: Sangster's Book Stores, in association with Heinemann, 1979).
