= Darker Than Blue: Soul from Jamdown, 1973–1980 =

Compilation album by Various Artists
- Released: 2001
- Genre: Soul
- Label: Blood and Fire

Professional ratings
Review scores
Source	Rating
AllMusic	4.5/5 stars
Austin Chronicle	4/5 stars

Darker Than Blue: Soul From Jamdown, 1973–1980 is a compilation album released in 2001. It consists of soul and R&B-styled songs recorded by Jamaican reggae artists, including a number of covers of contemporary American singles.

David Dacks of Exclaim! wrote that "the songs of Darker than Blue favour socially conscious American tunes as interpreted by a more diverse selection of artists than Blood and Fire usually covers."

== Track listing ==
1. "Ghetto Funk" - Boris Gardiner and Leslie Butler (3:09) written by Boris Gardiner
2. "Collie Stuff" - The Chosen Few (2:52) written by Bell/Brown/Mickens/Smith/Thomas/Westfield
3. "Slipping into Darkness" - Carl Bradney (3:05) written by Allen/Brown/Dickerson/Dewayne/Jordan/Miller/Oskar/Scott/Sylvester and originally performed by War
4. "Is It Because I'm Black?" - Ken Boothe (3:27) written by Johnson/Jones/Watts and originally recorded by Syl Johnson
5. "Get Involved" - Freddie McGregor (3:34) written by Jackson/Moore/Williams and originally recorded by George Jackson
6. "Ain't No Love in the Heart of the City - Al Brown (3:26) written by Price/Walsh and originally recorded by Bobby "Blue" Bland
7. "Mango Walk" - The In-Crowd (3:22) traditional, arranged by Delroy Wilson
8. "Ain't No Sunshine" - Ken Boothe (2:15) written and originally recorded by Bill Withers
9. "Gypsy Woman" - Milton Henry (3:01) written by Curtis Mayfield and originally recorded by The Impressions
10. "Give Me Your Love (a.k.a. Super Soul)" - Junior Murvin (2:07) written and originally recorded by Curtis Mayfield
11. "For the Love of You" - John Holt (3:39) written by E. Isley/K. Isley/M. Isley/R. Isley/Jasper and originally recorded by The Isley Brothers
12. "It's a Shame" - Alton Ellis (2:48) written by GarrettWonder/Wright and originally recorded by The Spinners
13. "I'm Your Puppet" - Jimmy London (3:38) written by Oldham/Penn and originally recorded by James & Bobby Purify
14. "Get Ready (12" Mix)" - Delroy Wilson (5:40) written by Smokey Robinson and originally recorded by The Temptations
15. "Darker Than Blue" - Lloyd Charmers (2:58) written and originally recorded by Curtis Mayfield
16. "Why Can't We Live Together?" - Tinga Stewart (6:59) written and originally recorded by Timmy Thomas
17. "Baltimore" - The Tamlins (4:01) written and originally recorded by Randy Newman, popularized by Nina Simone
18. "Hotter Reggae Music" - Welton Irie (3:52) written by Welton Irie
