= Hopeton Lewis =

Jamaican-American singer (1947–2014)

- Born: 3 October 1947; Kingston, Jamaica
- Origin: Kingston, Jamaica
- Died: 4 September 2014 (aged 66) Brooklyn, New York, U.S
- Genres: Rocksteady, reggae
- Instrument: Vocals
- Years active: 1960s–2014
- Website: www.songs4lifeministry.com

Hopeton Lewis (3 October 1947 – 4 September 2014) was a Jamaican born singer of rocksteady and reggae, an arranger, and radio music presenter.

== Biography ==
Lewis was born in Kingston, Jamaica. He sang in church from an early age, and started performing as a youth, forming a singing group called the Regals. By the mid-1960s, he began recording and had one of the earliest rocksteady hits with "Take It Easy" in late 1966. The track was recorded with Lynn Taitt and the Jets, and is regarded as one of the first rocksteady singles. He had several more Jamaican hits in the late 1960s and early 1970s, including the first 'herb' song ever recorded there, "Cool Collie". He worked for Duke Reid as an arranger and backing vocalist, and won the Festival Song Contest in 1970 with "Boom Shaka Lacka". He began working as a singer with Byron Lee & the Dragonaires, and in 1971 had a hit with "Grooving Out on Life".

Lewis continued to release records, but his success after the early 1970s was limited. Lewis released This Is Gospel in 1996 on his own label, Bay City Music, founded in the 1980s. Much of his later work was in the gospel genre, including Reaching Out to Jesus (2000).

He lived the later period of his life in Brooklyn, New York, where he presented a show on Grace Deliverance Radio.

Lewis died on 4 September 2014 at his home in Brooklyn, aged 66, after suffering kidney failure.

The Disciples roots reggae and dub musicians have a record label entitled Boom Shaka Laka, named in honour of, and inspired by Hopeton Lewis' song (as well as by Jah Shaka and reggae culture and history in general). The Disciples also wrote an influential roots reggae fanzine called Boom Shaka Laka, also named after the Hopeton Lewis record. The author, Lol Bell-Brown (who works for Dub Vendor) named the magazine after the Hopeton Lewis song. The first issue was released in 1988 and over the four following years the magazine became one of the most important publications to cover, for the time, the current roots scene as well as classic roots records. There were 11 issues released, of which all are sought-after collector's items.

== Albums ==
- Take It Easy (1968), Merritone
- Grooving Out on Life (1971), Dynamic Sounds/Trojan
- Dynamic Hopeton Lewis (1974), Dragon
- All Night Bubblin' (1985), Boss
- Love, Life and Music (1997), Songs 4 Life
- Reaching Out to Jesus (2000), Orchard
- Caribbean Gospel Jubilee (2000), Rockstone
- Inner Peace (2001), Songs 4 Life
- A Holy Christmas (2002), Songs 4 Life
- Love Life & Music (2007), Quartz
- Hopeton Lewis Sings Home Coming Classics (2007), Songs 4 Life
- Hymns (2007), Songs 4 Life
- This Is Gospel (2008), Sun Moon & Stars
- Worship (2008), Songs 4 Life
- Lay Your Hands on Me Jesus (2008), Songs 4 Life
- Love Ballads Vol. One (2008), Rockstone
- Praise and Worship (2008), Songs 4 Life
- The Inspirational Hopeton Lewis
- Country Gospel (2008), Songs 4 Life
- Healing: 42 Years of Music (2009), Songs 4 Life
- All Island Gospel Revival, Songs 4 Life
- Voice of Thanksgiving, Songs 4 Life
- Song's of Faith (2013). Songs 4 Life/VP
- De Word Through Music (2014), Songs 4 Life/VP

Compilations

- Classic Gold Collection (1998), Rockstone
- Take It Easy: Rock Steady Reggae (1999), K&K/VP
- 40 Years: Happy Birthday: Celebrating 40 Years of Music (2008), Songs 4 Life
