= Little Hero (disambiguation) =

Little Hero may refer to:

- "A Little Hero" Malen'kij geroj (Маленький герой), an 1849 short story by Fyodor Dostoevsky
- A Little Hero (film), a 1913 American short comedy film
- Little Hero (born 1972), Jamaican reggae singer
- Little Hero, after Molière, a 1950 play by Paul Goodman
