= Spectacular =

Spectacular may refer to:

- "Spectacular" (Graham Coxon song), a 2004 song by Graham Coxon
- "Spectacular" (Kiely Williams song), the 2010 debut single by Kiely Williams
- Spectacular (album), a 2012 album by ZE:A
- Spectacular!, a 2009 television movie produced by Nickelodeon
- The Spectacular, a 2021 Dutch-Irish crime television series
- Spectacular (singer) (born 1976), Jamaican reggae artist
- Restoration spectacular, an elaborately staged "machine play" popular in Restoration-era London
- "Spectacular" Blue Smith, a member of Pretty Ricky
- Spectacular mark, a term for a type of mark in Australian rules football

== See also ==
- Spectacle, refers to an event that is memorable for the appearance it creates
