= Ossie Hibbert =

- Born: Oswald Hibbert; 16 January 1951; Kingston, Jamaica
- Died: 1 July 2012 (aged 61) Long Island, New York
- Genres: Reggae
- Instruments: Organ, Piano, keyboards
- Years active: Mid-1970s–2012
- Labels: Earthquake, Live & Love
- Formerly of: The Professionals; The Aggrovators; The Revolutionaries

Oswald "Ossie" Hibbert (16 January 1951 – 1 July 2012) was a Jamaican organist, keyboard player and record producer.

== Biography ==
Hibbert began to be active in Jamaican music in the mid-1970s, working as a keyboard player as part of The Professionals, The Aggrovators and The Revolutionaries, and playing on dozens of albums by artists such as Johnny Clarke, Gregory Isaacs, Jimmy London, Delroy Wilson, and Linval Thompson. He recorded two albums in the 1970s, Crueshal Dub (1976) and Satisfaction in Dub (1978), and in the late 1970s began working as a producer of other artists at Channel One Studios, his album productions including Gregory Isaacs Meets Ronnie Davis, Mr. Isaacs (Gregory Isaacs), Creation (Freddie McKay), Cocaine in My Brain (Dillinger), and Earthquake Dub. He opened his own Ossie Hibbert Productions company in the 1980s and worked with artists such as Gregory Isaacs, Carlene Davis, and Pat Kelly. Still active in the 2000s, his recent credits include production work for Chaka Demus & Pliers, Errol Dunkley, Peter Hunnigale, and The Wailing Souls.

== Death ==
Hibbert died in New York on 1 July 2012 of a heart attack.

== Discography ==
- Crueshal Dub (1976), Earthquake
- Satisfaction in Dub (1978), Live & Love – credited to Ossie Hibbert & the Revolutionaries
- Leggo Dub (2005), Hotpot
