= Rod Taylor (singer) =

- Born: 2 March 1957 (age 69)
- Origin: Kingston, Jamaica
- Genres: Reggae
- Instrument: Vocals

Rod Taylor (born 2 March 1957, in Kingston, Jamaica), also known as Rocky T, is a reggae singer and producer.

== Biography ==
After forming a short-lived group called The Aliens with Barry Brown and Johnny Lee, Taylor recorded his first single, "Bad Man Comes and Goes" in 1975 for Ossie Hibbert. He gained exposure as part of Bertram Brown's Freedom Sounds collective (along with other reggae artists such as Prince Alla and Earl Zero), releasing the hit single "Ethiopian Kings", which led to work with Mikey Dread. He subsequently worked with a variety of producers in the late 1970s and early 1980s including Prince Far I, Ossie Hibbert, Prince Hammer, and Nigger Kojak.

Taylor's debut album, If Jah Should Come Now, was issued in 1979, with Where Is Your Love Mankind following in 1980. After a few quiet years, Taylor re-emerged in the late 1980s with the One In a Million album, with further releases following into the 2000s. Rod Taylor is still performing with sound systems or bands, especially with the French Band Positive Roots Band.

== Albums ==
- If Jah Should Come Now (1980) Belva Sounds/Daddy Kool/Little Luke
- Where Is Your Love Mankind (1980) Greensleeves
- One In a Million (1989) Sonic Sounds
- Lonely Girl (1990) King Culture
- Liberate (1993) Word Sound & Power
- Tell Dem (1999) Word Sound & Power
- Ethiopian Kings (1999) Patate
- Blackman History (2000) Mellow Sound
- Shining Bright (2002) Jah Warrior
- Trust In Jah (2003) Cousins
- The Prophet Rise Again Corner Stone
- Garden of Eden (2007) Belleville
- Hold On Strong (2009) Nagona Music Records
- Stop & Look (2009) Sip A Cup
