= Addis Pablo =

Jamaican reggae musician

Addis Pablo is a Jamaican reggae musician, the son of Augustus Pablo.

Addis and his sister Isis have carried on their father's musical heritage both on stage and off. Following in his father's footsteps Addis has been producing his own music and has been touring globally for several years Addis Pablo's debut album titled “In His Father’s House” was released in 2014 and was received worldwide with high ratings. The project featured other Jamaican artists such as Exile Di Brave, Earl Sixteen, Prince Alla, Chezidech, and more. Some of his other projects include Suns of Dub x Walshy Fire Major Lazer Mixtape (2013), Sizzla x Suns Of Dub “Jah Jah Solve Dem” (2014), and Suns of Dub “Far East Mixtape” with Mighty Crown (2015), and his most recent project “Majestic Melodies” mixtape (2017).

Addis has toured globally delivering his father's music and memory to his father's fans as well as delivering his own music to a new generation of fans. He has toured throughout Europe, Japan, Germany, United States, France, and more. He has opened for acts such as Mighty Diamonds and Earl "Chinna" Smith. Addis has been featured on major international reggae festivals including Garance Reggae Festival, Reggae Jam, Reggae on the River, and Berlin Reggae Vintage Night, to name a few.
