= Black Echoes =

- Running time: 2 Hours
- Country of origin: Ireland
- Language: English
- Home station: 103.2 Dublin City FM (since 2003)
- Hosted by: John Public
- Recording studio: East Wall Road, Dublin
- Original release: 12 December 1982 – present
- Audio format: Music
- Website: Black Echoes Online

Black Echoes is a Jamaican music show which has been broadcasting on radio in Dublin, Ireland. The show airs a range of music, including reggae, ska, rock-steady and dub. The show is presented and produced by John Public.

The show broadcasts on Dublin City FM every Saturday on 103.2 FM in Dublin, and via internet radio. The show used to broadcast nationally on a monthly basis on RTÉ 2FM.

== History ==
John Public has presented Black Echoes since late 1982. In the beginning the show centred on many forms of black music but by 1984 it had concentrated solely on reggae music. The show was broadcast on numerous pirate stations based in South Dublin (and one in Bray, Co. Wickow) during the 1980s, 1990s and early 2000s, until he got a slot on Dublin City FM. The last pirate station John Public presented for was Jazz FM in 2003.

Miss Pat joined the programme as producer in 1985, having moved from London, where she grew up listening to all styles of Jamaican music. Since then the programme has incorporated sub-genres including ska, shuffle, rock steady, early reggae, Mento, as well as Deejay, dub, dub poetry and ragga.

In 2008, the show moved its slot from 8–9 pm to 9–10 pm due to schedule changes which include Little Steven's Underground Garage a syndicated show broadcast on various radio stations across the world. In July 2009 the show changed its time slot again to 7:30–9:00 pm, changing again from 7.00 to 9.00 pm in October 2015. It subsequently moved again to the later timeslot of 10pm to midnight.

== Interviews ==
The show has seen interviews with: Desmond Dekker, Toots Hibbert, Sly and Robbie, Derrick Morgan, Dennis Alcapone, Brigadier Jerry, Ranking Joe, Half Pint, Tony Rebel, Mikey Dread Campbell, Edi Fitzroy, Terry Ganzie, Winston Grennan, Denzil Dennis, Winston Francis, Aj Franklin, Jah Woosh, B.B. Seaton, Ranking Miss P. George 'Peckings' Price, Lukes Morgan of Morgan Heritage, L.M.S. Bobby 'Massive B.'Konders, Jah Warrior, Scientist, Tony 'Downbeat' Screw, Tony Chin, Ini Kamoze, Lester Sterling, Vin 'Don. D.Jnr' Gordon, Lehbanchuleh, Brian And Tony Gold, Winston 'Flames' Jarrett, Susan Cadogan, Robert 'Dandy' Thompson, Glen Adams, Peter Hunningale, Stranger 'Strangejah' Cole, Delroy Williams, Jimmy James.
