= Barry Brown (singer) =

- Born: Barrington Michael Brown; March 1957, 6 Jamaica
- Origin: Kingston, Jamaica
- Died: 29 May 2004
- Genres: Reggae
- Years active: Mid-1970s–2004

Barry Brown (Kingston, March 6, 1957 — Kingston — 29 May 2004) was a Jamaican reggae singer-songwriter, initially coming to prominence in the 1970s with his work with Bunny Lee, but remaining popular throughout his career.

== Career ==
Brown was one of a number of singers to find success in the 1970s under record producer Bunny Lee. After forming a short-lived group called The Aliens, with Rod Taylor and Johnny Lee, Brown went solo. Although his first release, Girl You're Always on My Mind, had little impact, his vocal style soon found popularity, with his first hit single coming with 1979's Step It Up Youthman, which led to an album of the same name on Paradise Records. One of the most successful artists of the early dancehall era, Brown worked with some of Jamaica's top producers of the time, including Linval Thompson, Winston "Niney The Observer" Holness, Sugar Minott and Coxsone Dodd, as well as releasing self-produced material. He recorded for Studio One in 1983, including Far East.

After releasing eleven albums between 1979 and 1984, Brown's releases became more sporadic, although his work continued to feature prominently on sound systems such as those of Jah Shaka, who regularly played out discomix vocal and dub excursions like Scientist and King Tubby's engineered radical polemics, Separation, and Step it up Youthman, the spiritually conscious Enter the Kingdom of Zion ( also known as No Wicked Shall Enter ) and his recut of Linval Thompson 's Cool Down Your Temper, which Barry Brown retitled Cool Pon Your Corner and Natty Roots Man, of which the vocal was partially based on Johnny Clarke's Enter into His Gates With Praise, the dub being a recut of jazz standard Take Five, with Tommy McCook on flute .

In 1980, Barry Brown also released the Rockers discomix Natty Dread Nah Run on the Strong Like Samson label with Anthony Johnson (musician) of Mystic I, a musical disc which was in demand amongst the Roots reggae sound system fraternity at the time. In the same year, he teamed up with Jah Thomas to release the Scientist engineered Channel One Studios Discomix, Peace and Love on Keith Stone's Daddy Kool record label out of Dean Street.

== Death ==
In the 1990s, Brown's health deteriorated, suffering from asthma and substance abuse problems, and he died in May 2004 in Sone Waves recording studio in Kingston, Jamaica, after falling and hitting his head.

== Discography ==
- Stand Firm (1978), Justice
- Step It Up Youthman (1979), Paradise
- Cool Pon Your Corner (1979), Trojan
- Superstar (1979), Striker Lee/Jackpot
- I'm Not So Lucky (1980), Black Roots
- Prince Jammy Presents Barry Brown Showcase (1980), Jammy's/Micron
- Showcase (1980), Third World
- Artist of the 80's (1980), TR International
- Vibes of Barry Brown (1981), Gorgon
- Far East (1982), Channel One
- Barry (1982), Vista Sounds – reissued as The Best of Barry Brown (1995), JA Classics
- I'm Still Waiting (1983), Rocktone Records
- Showdown Vol 1 (1984), Empire/Hitbound – with Little John
- Roots & Culture (1984), Uptempo – with Willi Williams
- Right Now (1984), Time
- More Vibes Of Barry Brown Along With Stama Rank (1986), King Culture – with Stama Rank
- Same Sound (1990)
- Reggae Heights (2003), Mafia & Fluxy

Compilations

- The Best Of Barry Brown (1984), Culture Press
- Barry Brown, Thompson Sound
- Mr Moneyman (1991), Lagoon
- Barry Brown & Johnny Clarke Sings Roots & Culture (1992), Fatman – with Johnny Clarke
- Love & Protection (1998), Prestige
- Showcase : Midnight Rock at Channel One (1999), Abraham
- Barry Brown Meets Cornell Campbell (2000), Culture Press
- Platinum – the Greatest Hits (2001)
- Roots And Culture (2002), Studio One
- Roots Ina Greenwich Farm (2002), Cactus – with Johnny Clarke
- Steppin Up Dub Wise (2003), Jamaican Recordings
- Rich Man Poor Man (2003), Moll Selekta
- At King Tubbys Studio (2007), Attack
- Barry Brown in Dub (2010), Black Arrow
