= Stevie Face =

Jamaican reggae singer

Anwar Owen Hanchard (born February 12, 1975) better known as Stevie Face is a Jamaican reggae singer.

== Career ==
Hanchard was born February 12, 1975 in Yallahs, St Thomas. Throughout his career, he has produced a number of albums, and in 2025, he collaborated with Mikey Bennett and Rohan 'Snowcone' Fuller, to record a cover of John Holt's 'I Want You To Want Me'.
