= Mighty Mystic =

Jamaican reggae singer

- Born: Kevin Mark Holness; 11 November 1980 (age 45); St Elizabeth, Jamaica
- Genres: Reggae
- Occupations: Singer-songwriter, record producer
- Years active: 1998–present
- Website: www.mightymystic.com

Kevin Mark Holness (born 11 November 1980), better known as Mighty Mystic, is a Jamaican-born, Somerville, Massachusetts-based reggae artist. He is the younger brother to current Jamaican Prime Minister Andrew Holness.

Born in St Elizabeth, Jamaica, he moved to Boston at the age of nine with his family. He began performing as 'Mystic' and broke through with his 2006 single "Riding on the Clouds", which received radio airplay across the East coast of the US. His debut album Wake up the World (2010) included "Revolution", "Riding on the Clouds", "Original Love", and "Slipped Away", with appearances from Shaggy and roots rocker Lutan Fyah.

== Discography ==
=== Albums ===
- Wake up the World (2010)
- Concrete World (2014)
- The Art of Balance (2016)
- enter the mystic (2019)
- Giant (2022)

=== EPs ===
- Wake up the World EP (2010)

=== Singles ===
- "Riding on the Clouds" (2006)
- "Revolution" (2008)
- "Here I Am" (w/ Shaggy (2008)
- "Slipped Away" (2009)
- "I Alone" (2010)
- "Rems Up" (w/ Lutan Fyah) (2010)
- "Original Love" (2011)
- "Concrete World" (2013)
- "Cali Green" (2014)
- "War (Rumors of War" (2014)
- "True Love" (2014)
- "Happy" (2014)
- "Something Bout Mary" (2016)
- "How I Rock" (2016)

== Television ==
- WCSH Channel 6

== Sources ==
- Mighty Mystic's work of art @ Web.archive.org
- Mighty Mystic The Art of Balance album review @ Topshelfreggae.com
- Mighty Mystic to Release New Record! @ Thepier.org
- Mighty Mystic Says Boston is a Bigger Reggae Town Than You Realize @ Metro.us
- Boston based singer/songwriter, Mighty Mystic, has become a leading trail blazer in the East Coast Reggae Movement @ Reggaearoundtheworld.wordpress.com
- Reggae Artist Mighty Mystic @ Mixturemagazine.wordpress.com
