= Vivian Jones (singer) =

Jamaican-born British reggae singer (1957–2025)

- Born: April 1st 1957; Trelawny Parish, Jamaica
- Died: 27 October 2025 (aged 68)
- Genres: Reggae; roots reggae; dub, lovers rock
- Years active: 1974–2025
- Labels: Jet Star, Freedom Sounds, Fashion Records, Stingray Records, Third World, Seven Leaves, Jah Shaka Music, Imperial House, Ruff Cutt

Vivian Jones (1957 – 27 October 2025) was a Jamaican-born British reggae singer, who performed with several bands in the 1970s before recording as a solo artist from 1980.

== Life and career ==
Born in Trelawny Parish, Jamaica, in 1957, Jones relocated to England at the age of ten to join his parents who had emigrated there a few years earlier. They lived in and around London, moving between Willesden, Alperton, and Harrow, with Jones becoming increasingly involved in the local reggae scene, and in the mid-1970s he began performing with sound systems, initially as a deejay. In the 1970s he was a member of several bands including The Spartans, The Doctor Birds, the Mighty Vibes and the Pieces. In 1980, he began to record as a solo artist, enjoying a hit that year with "Good Morning" (actually a remixed recording by the Mighty Vibes), which topped the UK reggae charts. The following year, he was voted "Most Talented Singer" in a poll for Black Echoes. He had a series of hits, with his popularity also spreading to Jamaica. Disillusioned with the music industry, he returned to Jamaica in 1982 to stay with his grandparents, and also recorded some material there.

Jones returned to London and began work outside of music. He soon began recording again in his spare time, and his debut album, Bank Robbery, was released in 1984, and recorded with London band, Undivided Roots and Creation Rebel, whose members were Carlton "Bubblers" Ogilvie, Tony "Ruff Cut" Philips, Don Campbell and Eskimo Fox ( who had trained at Alpha Boys' School ). Dubplate versions of Flash It And Gwan from the album were particularly well-received on Jah Shaka's sound system, and Jones then went on to work with Jah Shaka and The Fasimbas, collaborating on the Jah Works album, released in 1987. Rarely seen footage of Jah Shaka playing Vivian Jones' Dubs features in Handsworth Songs, a 1986 British documentary film directed by John Akomfrah and produced by Lina Gopaul. It was filmed during the 1985 riots in Handsworth and London and shown on Channel 4. The production company was the Black Audio Film Collective.

He also recorded in Jamaica for producers such as Bobby Digital and Junior Reid and recorded duets with Sylvia Tella, Debbie Gordon, and Deborahe Glasgow. In the 1990s, Jones set up his own Imperial House label and became known primarily for his lovers rock material, enjoying big hits with "Sugar Love" and "Strong Love", but also recorded more roots-oriented music with albums such as Iyaman (1994). In 1991, he was named "Best Male Artist" in the British Reggae Industry Awards. He enjoyed an international hit in the late 1990s with "Jah See Dem a Come". In 2007, he released the album 50th, featuring old rhythms from producers such as Bunny Lee, to celebrate his 50th birthday. Lovers Rocking was released in 2013, and Jones recorded material in Jamaica with Sly and Robbie and Bobby Digital for an album planned for release in 2014.

Jones died on 27 October 2025, at the age of 68.

== Discography ==
- Bank Robbery (1984), Ruff Cut
- Jah Works (1987), Jah Shaka
- Collection 1 (1989), Rosie
- Jamaica Love (1990), Imperial House
- Strong Love (1993), Jet Star
- Iyaman (1994), Imperial House
- Love Is For Lovers (1995), Imperial House
- Big Leaders, Imperial House
- Big Leaders Dub, Imperial House
- Moment of Magic, Imperial House
- The Vivian Jones Songbook Vol.1 (2002), Imperial House
- 50th (2007), Cousins
- One Way Exclusive (2009)
- Lovers Rocking (2013)

Compilations

- Reggae Max (1997), Jet Star
