= Spectacular (singer) =

Jamaican reggae artist

Spectacular (born January 26, 1976) is a Jamaican reggae artist and member of the Rastafari movement who began his career in 1993. He has worked extensively in Europe and worked with Lutan Fyah and the producer Lorenzo "Renzo" Wilson amongst others. In 2005, he released one of his most famous albums titled Evil hymns, Rusty Nails. In 2012, Spectacular was featured on Mavrick Records Karukera Riddim, with a song titled "Dem Frass".
