= Icho Candy =

- Born: Winston Lloyd Evans c. 1955 (age 70–71)
- Origin: Jamaica
- Genres: Reggae, Dub music
- Instrument: vocals
- Years active: late 1970s–present
- Labels: Jah Shaka, Joe Gibbs (producer), Augustus Pablo Rockers label, Tapper Zukie's 'Tappa' label

Winston Lloyd Evans (born c. 1955), better known as Icho Candy, is a Jamaican reggae singer.

== Biography ==
Icho Candy first came to prominence singing with sound systems such as the one run by producer Jack Ruby. Ruby produced Candy's debut release, "Little Children No Cry", but it was not a success, and Candy moved on to work with Joe Gibbs, with whom he recorded "Bandulu". His third single, "Captain Selassie I" gave him a breakthrough, proving to be his biggest hit, although he received little financial reward. His career got a boost when a performance on Ruby's sound system was featured in the Channel 4 documentary Deep Roots Music, leading to interest from the UK. He recorded more successfully for Prince Jazzbo's Ujama label, with singles such as "Mr. User" and "Bloodsucker". He went on to record for Augustus Pablo before working with Jah Shaka in the late 1980s and 1990s, releasing two albums on Shaka's label.

Candy's signature tune, "Captain Selassie I", originally released on the Jwyanza label, has become very popular since its release in 1983 and remains sought after in its 45rpm single format.

Icho Candy continues to perform live, including a set at Rebel Salute in 2009.

== Discography ==
=== Albums ===
- Devils High (1990), Black Star
- Glory to the King (1993), Jah Shaka
- Dub Salute 2 (1994), Jah Shaka

=== Singles ===
- "Little Children No Cry"
- "Bandulu", Joe Gibbs
- "Captain Selassie I" (1982), Joe Gibbs
- "Jah Calling All Over The World" (1986), Creation
- "Cool Down Sufferer" (1987), Selah
- "Babylon" (1987), Rockers
- "Mr. User", Ujama
- "Blood Sucker" (1988), Ujama
- "Send Back The Gun", Captain Selassie-I
- "Change Partner"
- "Down the Lakes"
