= Kemar Thompson =

- Also known as: Jr. Pinchers, Noncowa
- Born: 10 October 1982 (age 43)
- Origin: Jamaica
- Genres: Reggae
- Label: Royal Concert Productions

Kemar Thompson (a.k.a. Noncowa, a.k.a. Jr. Pinchers) (born 10 October 1982, Jamaica) is a Jamaican reggae and dancehall artist. His is the eldest son of reggae mainstay Pinchers.
