= Me and You (band) =

Me and You are a Jamaican reggae trio.

== History ==
Me and You come from a musical family, discovered by Dennis Brown, they began their career in 1974, he, Alton Ellis, Castro Brown and Granville Blake produced two albums, Natty Dread and Natty Dread Version which have recently been released for the first time. They then continued their career in 1979, signing with the DEB Music label run by Castro Brown and Dennis Brown. (DEB stands for Dennis Emmanuel Brown). Their debut "This Love" reached the top 10 of the reggae chart and was followed by "You Never Know What You Got (Til It’s Gone)" produced by Dennis Brown and Castro Brown and backed by the We The People Band, which topped the reggae chart and was also a crossover success reaching number 31 on the UK Singles Chart in July 1979. These two tracks were taken from the From Me To You album produced by Dennis Brown and Castro Brown and backed by the We The People Band. They toured as part of the DEB showcase and in 1980 were voted among the best newcomers in the Black Echoes awards. They continued to enjoy reggae chart hits with singles such as "Let Me Go", "Casual Affair", "Who Told You So" and "Back Together Again" all taken from the album Let Me Go, and "Rock This Rub-A-Dub".

They were then mentored for several years by Alton Ellis whom they met producing songs for their Natty Dread and Natty Dread Version albums and then again doing backing vocals for him at DEB Music. The soulful group has worked with collaborators such as Bob Marley's The Wailers Band, Lee Perry's The Upsetters, Soul Syndicate, Earl "Chinna" Smith's High Times Band, The Studio One Band and We The People. Producers include Coxsone Dodd, Lee "Scratch" Perry, King Tubby, King Jammy, Sly and Robbie, Steely & Clevie, Bobby Digital and Dennis Bovell.

Contrary to popular belief, there are actually three members of the group. Two sisters and a brother. They were only marketed as a duo because DEB Music their then record company run by Dennis Brown and Castro Brown already had several other trios in the stable e.g. Carlton & The Shoes, Tamlins, 15, 16, 17 and Black Harmony.

Although acknowledged as purveyors of classic love songs, when they started in the mid-1970s, the first songs they sang were actually roots reggae, reflecting the social consciousness in Jamaica at the time and comprising half of the two albums, Natty Dread and Natty Dread Version. Songs such as "There Is A Land" based on the Abyssinians' "Satta Massa Gana", "Can't Stop Natty Dread" and "Dreadlocks In Moonlight", written and produced by Lee Perry are backed by various bands such as The Revolutionaries, The Aggrovators, Sly & Robbie, The Upsetters and The Original Wailers band. Love songs include "Hand It Over" (with The Horsemouth Wallace Band) and "Natural High" (with The Wailers Band), "Gee Baby" (with Skin Flesh & Bones) and "I Wanna Know" (with Chinna's High Times Band).

Their music encompasses and often fuses many genres within reggae (e.g. roots, dancehall, ragga, ska, dub and rock steady), as well as R&B, soul, garage and pop. With international hits in Jamaica, the Far East (where they are considered a soul group), US and Europe, they have developed a large and loyal fan base worldwide.

The group is still going strong and has never stopped recording. They have released 16 albums to date and more are due. Some of their singles are shown below.

They also produce other artists which include garage/house/dub fusion outfit AshbaCrew and reggae/dancehall band MegaMovement.

== Discography ==
=== Singles ===
- "This Love" (1979) DEB Music
- "The Melody" (1979) DEB Music
- "You Never Know What You Got (Til It's Gone)" (1979) DEB Music/Warner Bros (UK No. 31)
- "Let Me Go"
- "Casual Affair"
- "Who Told You So"
- "Rock This Rub-A-Dub"
- "Big Beat" Jammy's Records

=== Albums ===
- Natty Dread (Produced by Granville Blake, Dennis Brown, Alton Ellis and Castro Brown)
- Natty Dread Version (Produced by Granville Blake, Dennis Brown, Alton Ellis and Castro Brown)
- Soul Selection
- Stay
- Rough and Ready
- New Shortcake
- Live My Life
- From Me To You (with We The People Band) DEB Music
- Midnight Blue (with The Studio One Band)
- Let Me Go
- Let Me Go Dub
- Make Love Not War (with MegaMovement Band)
- New Shortcake Version
- Looking Somebody (Produced by Bobby Digital [Digital B] and Steely & Clevie)
- Railway Station (produced by Sir Coxsone, Prince Jammy and Steely & Clevie)
- Friends
