= Shalom (singer) =

Jamaican reggae singer

Steve Harper, better known as Shalom is a Jamaican reggae singer.

== Career ==
Harper began performing with the gospel group, Katalys Crew. He cites Sugar Minott as being an early protégé. He released his debut album, Baby I've Got News For You in 1999.

== Personal life ==
Harper is a Christian, and serves as a pastor in Spanish Town, St Catherine.
