= Professor Nuts =

Jamaican dancehall singer (born 1961)

- Born: Carl Wellington; 8 September 1961 (age 64)
- Origin: Kingston, Jamaica
- Genres: Dancehall
- Occupation: Dee jay
- Years active: 1979–present

Professor Nuts (born Carl Wellington, 8 September 1961, Kingston, Jamaica) is a Jamaican dancehall singer.

== History and recordings ==
Professor Nuts is known for the important role he played in Jamaican music. He was one of the first Jamaican artists that combined comedy, social commentary and music.

Professor Nuts started out as a dancer called Disco Nuts. After being inspired by the music of roots reggae artist Nicodemus in 1979, he started to write his own lyrics. Because of his clever and comical style, some friends gave him the name Professor Nuts. The first stage show he performed was at the reggae carnival at Cinema 2 in 1985.

Over the years he did not release a lot of records. In 1991 his first and only album called Make it Again was released. One of Professor Nuts' best known songs, "In A De Bus", is on this album. Other known songs are "Nuttn' Ah Gwan Fada", "Satan Strong", "Fish & Festival", "Funny Guy", "God Damn It" and "Don't" (these songs have mostly been released on dancehall compilation albums).

== Influences ==
Professor Nuts has been influenced by Josey Wales, Charlie Chaplin and Yellowman.

== See also ==
- Dancehall
