= Knowledge (band) =

Jamaican roots reggae band

- Origin: Kingston, Jamaica
- Genres: Roots reggae
- Years active: 1974–early 1980s
- Labels: A&M, Tamoki-Wambesi
- Past members: Anthony Doyley; Delroy Fowlin; Earl MacFarlane; Michael Smith; Michael Samuels; Paul Freeman; Magnus Skeen

Knowledge were a Jamaican roots reggae group, best known for their work in the late 1970s and early 1980s, which saw them sign to A&M Records.

== History ==
The group formed in the Rema area of Kingston, in 1974, the line-up including Anthony Doyley (lead vocals and main songwriter), Delroy Fowlin (vocals) aka Bronco Knowledge, Earl MacFarlane (vocals), Michael Smith (guitar), and Michael Samuels (vocals). Doyley had previously been a member of The Classics, who had recorded for Lee "Scratch" Perry in the late 1960s. Paul Freeman joined the group later in their career. They recorded for deejay and producer Tapper Zukie, first on the "Make Faith" single, with several releases on his "Stars" label. These led to a major label deal with A&M, who issued the group's debut album, Hail Dread (produced by Zukie), in 1978. The deal with A&M proved to be short-lived, with the group's second album, Judgement, issued on the Roach label in 1980. Samuels subsequently embarked on a solo career, and Freeman set up his own 'Sunshine' label, along with Trevor "Leggo Beast" Douglas.

In the early 1980s, the group worked with producer Roy Cousins, achieving reggae hits with "Na Buy Apartheid", "Chant Rasta Man", and "Fire Burn" on Cousins' Tamoki-Wambesi label. They used musicians including keyboard player Pablove Black, Winston Wright, Leroy "Horsemouth" Wallace, and Sowell Radics. Magnus Skeen (vocals) joined the group during this time to replace a member who had left the group earlier. These recordings were collected on the Stumbling Block album in 1982.

Three members of the group were murdered throughout the group's tenure, the last member killed was Magnus Skeen on 22 May 2002. The group split up, with Doyley emigrating to England. He died on 26 February 2011, aged 55. Delroy Fowlin also emigrated to England in 2001, and released his own albums, Tell Me Something and More Knowledge for the People; he now sings in the streets of Toulouse (France). Michael Smith migrated to England in May 2002 where he still resides.

== Discography ==
=== Albums ===
- Hail Dread (1978) A&M, reissued under the title Word, Sound and Power (1978) Tappa
- Judgement (1980) Roach
- Stumbling Block (1982) Tamoki-Wambesi (reissued 1995)

Compilations

- Straight Outta Trenchtown: 1975-1980 (2002) Makasound
- Kebra-Nagast (2005), Tamoki-Wambesi-Dove
- Rasta Don't Take Bribe (2006) Tamoki-Wambesi-Dove
