= Fred Locks =

- Born: Stafford Elliot; 1955 (age 69–70)
- Origin: Kingston, Jamaica
- Genres: Roots reggae
- Occupation: Singer-songwriter
- Years active: mid-1960s–present
- Labels: Jahmikmusic, Grounation, Vulcan, Revelations, Form, Tribesman, Regal, Starlight, Tan Yah, Xterminator, VP

Stafford Elliot (born 1955), better known as Fred Locks, is a roots reggae singer best known for his mid-1970s single "Black Star Liners" and the album of the same name.

== Biography ==
Born in Kingston, Jamaica, Elliott grew up in a strict Catholic home in the Franklin Town area of the city, along with eleven brothers and sisters, moving to Eastern Kingston when he was ten. His father and older brother played the guitar; with his older brother accompanying Elliott's early singing efforts. Like many of the Jamaican solo singers of the 1970s, Elliott began his career in the 1960s as part of a vocal harmony group, in his case a group he formed in secondary school, The Flames, and in 1966 The Lyrics, who recorded for Coxsone Dodd in the late 1960s, with tracks such as "A Get It", "Girls Like Dirt", and "Hear What The Old Man Say". They later moved on to Vincent Chin's Randy's setup, recording "Give Thanks", "East to the Right", and a cover of Simon & Garfunkel's "Bridge Over Troubled Water", also working with Lee "Scratch" Perry, and released the self-financed "Sing A Long" in 1971 on their own Lyric label. Disillusioned by the financial side of the Jamaican music industry, Elliott immersed himself in the Rastafarian faith, living on the beach at Harbour View. Elliott allowed his locks to grow to a great length, giving rise to his nickname of 'Fred Locks'. During his time living on the beach, he continued to write songs, one of which, "Black Star Liners", written with Owen Goode and referring to Marcus Garvey's shipping line (Black Star Line) intended to transport black Americans to Africa as part of the Back-to-Africa movement, came to the attention of producer and Twelve Tribes member Hugh Boothe. Boothe persuaded Locks to record the song, and it was released in 1975 on the Jahmikmusic label in Jamaica, and on Grounation in the United Kingdom, propelling Locks to cult status. This was followed up by "The Last Days", which had a lesser impact. Grounation offshoot Vulcan issued the debut album Black Star Liner/True Rastaman in 1976, an album that has remained popular with roots reggae audiences ever since, with the title track regarded as a roots anthem.

In the late 1970s, Elliott was also a member of the vocal trio Creation Steppers, along with Eric Griffiths and Willy Stepper, releasing records in Jamaica on their own Star of The East label, and having a hit in Jamaica with "Stormy Night". In 1980, the trio travelled to the UK for a small tour, and began an association with London-based sound system operator and producer Lloyd Coxsone, who released a number of singles by the group, and also some Fred Locks solo records. These were collected on the album Love and only Love in 1982.

In 1982, Locks married an American woman and moved to the United States, recording only sporadically until the mid-1990s, when he recorded an album, Culturally, for Phillip Smart. followed by albums on Philip "Fatis" Burrell's Xterminator label and on VP.

== Album discography ==
- Black Star Liners/True Rastaman (1976) Vulcan
- Nebuchadnezzar, King Of Babylon (1980) Revelations (also issued as Love and Harmony (1980) on Form, with different track order) (Fred Locks & The Steppers)
- Love and Only Love (1982) Tribesman/Regal (Fred Locks & The Creation Steppers)
- Culturally (1995) Starlight/Tan Yah
- Never Give Up (1998) Xterminator
- Missing Link (2000) VP
- Glorify The Lord (2008) Cousins
- Music Is My Calling (2012) Irie Sounds International
- Reggae Legends (4-CD Box Set Containing 4 Albums: Black Star Liner, Black Star Liner in Dub, Love And Only Love, The Missing Link 2012)
- Right Away EP (2020)
