= Lutan Fyah =

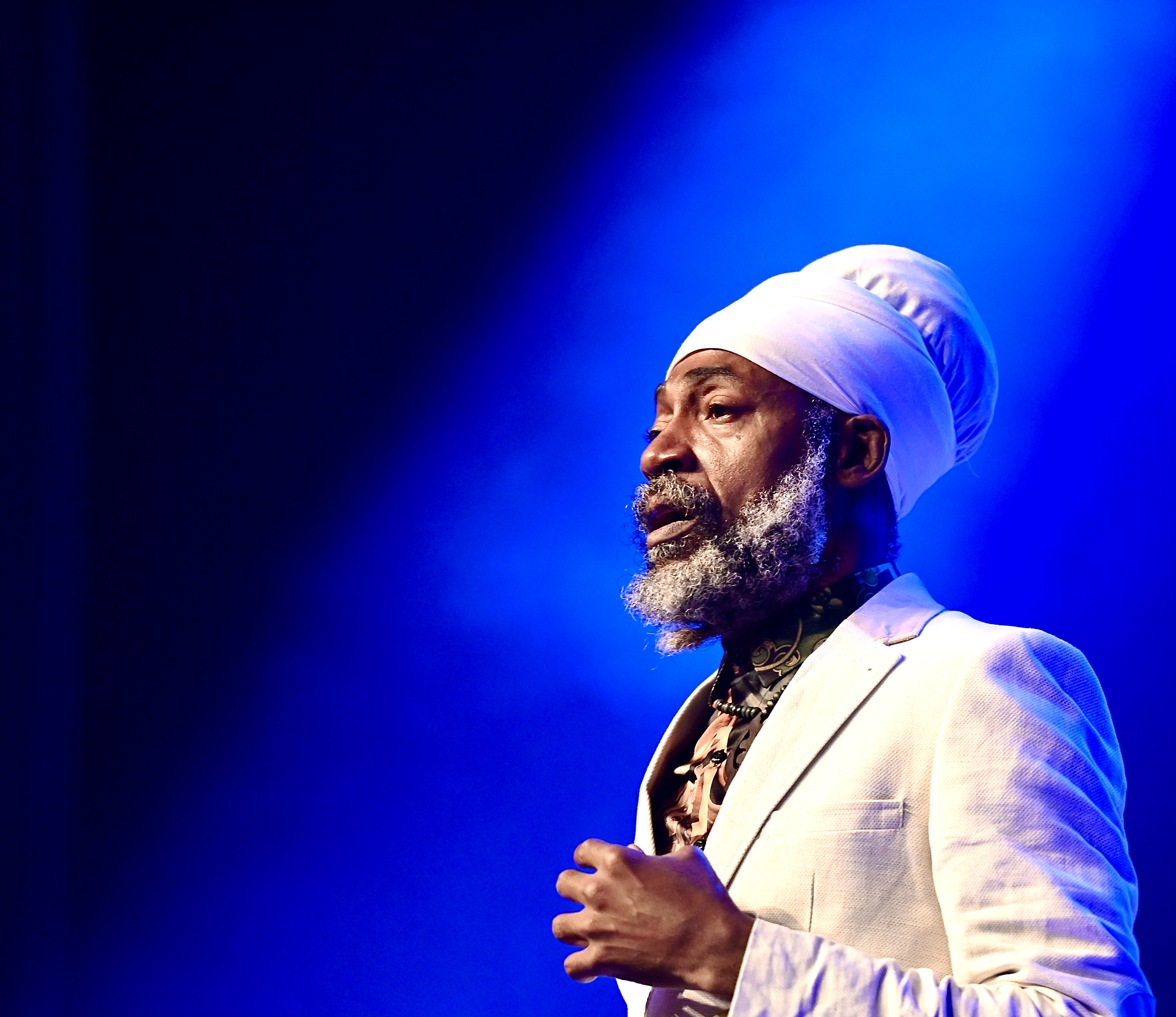
- Lutan Fyah at the Roma, Borgerhout, Belgium in 2023.

Background information
- Also known as: Lutan Fyah
- Born: Anthony Martin; 6 December 1975 (age 50); Spanish Town, Saint Catherine Parish, Jamaica
- Genres: Reggae
- Occupation: Singer
- Years active: 1999–present
- Labels: Various

Anthony Martin (born 6 December 1975), better known as Lutan Fyah, is a Jamaican musician, singer, and member of the Rastafari movement Bobo Shanti.

== Background ==
Born in Spanish Town, Saint Catherine Parish, Jamaica, Martin studied Architecture at the University of Technology and played professional football for Constant Spring F.C. before focusing on music.

Using the stage name Lutan Fyah, sometimes credited as Lute and Fyah, he started his musical career in 1999. He recorded his first songs for Buju Banton's Gargamel Records. His first two albums were released by Lustre Kings and Minor 7 Flat 5, the latter of which included Fyah as guest artist on albums by Turbulence and Luciano.

Fyah also released several singles on various label from Jamaica, United States and the UK, and has also covered Dr. Dre songs and The Fugees. He has appeared on many compilation albums and featured in many other artists song releases. In 2009 Dubstep artist Rusko released Babylon Volume 2 including the track "Sound Guy Is My Target" featuring Fyah.

Fyah has voiced a number of singles for Jah Warrior including Never Surrender My Faith, Let Righteousness Be Your Guide, Jah is living featuring Khalilah Rose and Crab Inna Barrel. Fyah has performed several times at the Uppsala Reggae Festival.

His tenth studio album, Life of a King, was released in September 2013, and was followed by European and African tours. A concert from December 2013 to celebrate his birthday, featuring guests including Chezidek, Jah Mason, Fantan Mojah, Jah Cure, Gyptian, Sizzla, Ninjaman, and Popcaan, was recorded for DVD release.

In September 2019, his fifteenth studio album, Longest Liva, was released, featuring collaborations with Johnny Live and Beenie Man.

== Discography ==
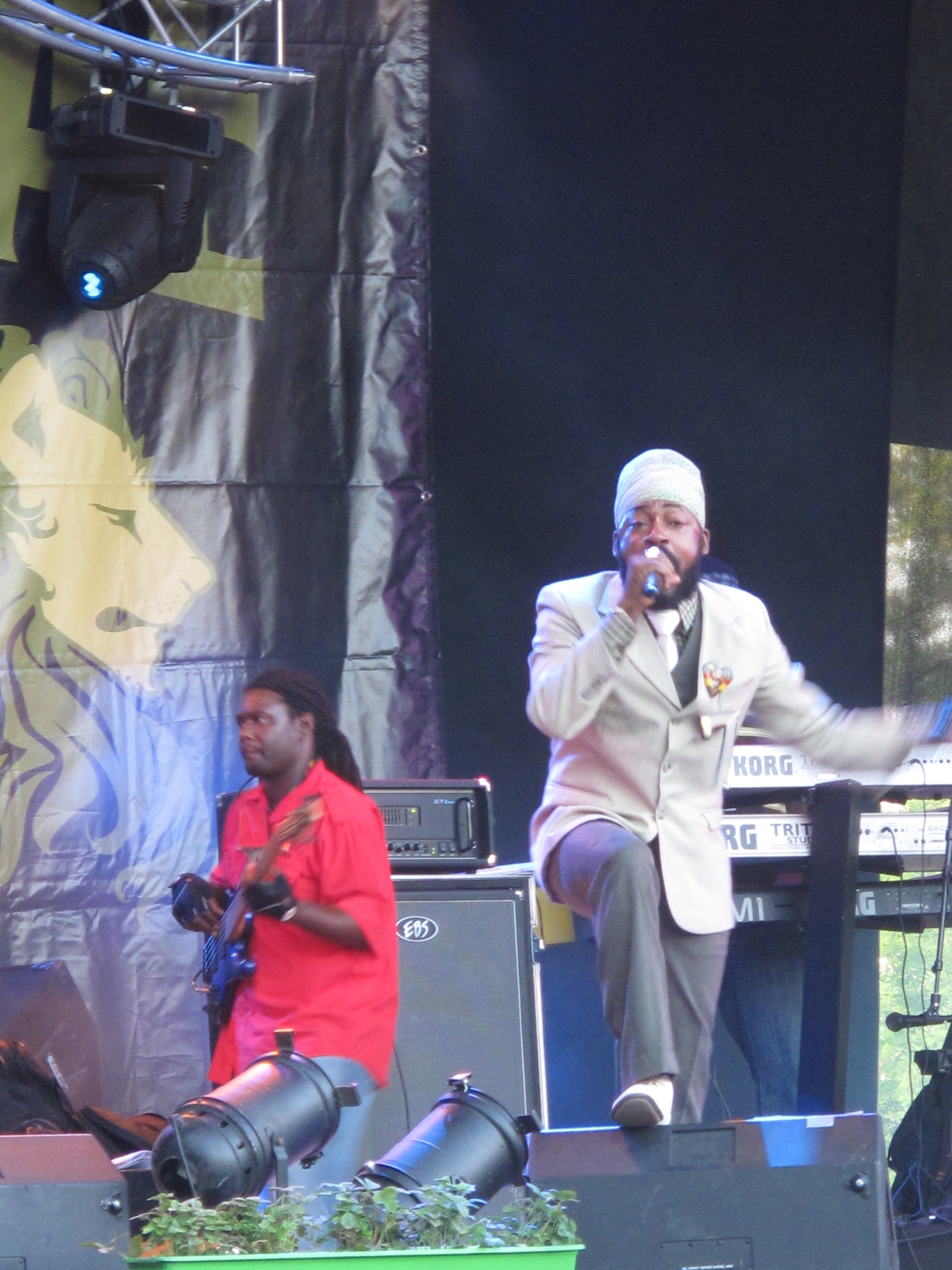
Lutan Fyah, Upsalla (2009)

- Dem No Know Demself (2004), Minor 7 Flat 5
- Time & Place (2005), Lustre Kings
- Phantom War (2006), Greensleeves
- Healthy Lifestyle (2006), VP
- You Bring Blessings, (2007), Cousins
- African Be Proud (2009), Rastar
- Africa (2009), Continental Record Services
- Justice (2009), Philadub
- The King's Son (2009), In the Streetz Music
- A New Day (2011), Starplayer
- Truly (2012), One Drop
- Nuh Fear (2012), (featured with Gisto), Historical
- Life of a King (2013), Grillaras
- Get Rid A Di Wicked (2014), Bread Back
- Dash Ah Fire (2017), Robert E Productions
- Music Never Dies (2017), Grade Records
- Sell Out (2018), Studio Vibes Entertainment
- Longest Liva (2019), Lock City Music Group
- Strength & Resilience (2025), I Grade Records

Live albums

- Live in San Francisco (2009), 2B1
