= Queen Omega (singer) =

Trinidadian reggae singer

- Born: Jeneile Osborne c. 1981; San Fernando, Trinidad and Tobago
- Genres: Dancehall, roots reggae
- Occupation: Singer
- Instrument: Vocals
- Years active: 2000–present
- Labels: Jet Star, Ariwa

Jeneile Osborne (born c. 1981), better known as Queen Omega, is a reggae singer born in Trinidad.

== Biography ==
Osborne was born in 1981 in San Fernando, Trinidad and Tobago. After singing in calypso and soca bands, she turned to reggae, and began performing roots reggae influenced by her adoption of the Rastafarian faith. She became based in England, where she began recording in 2000, releasing her self-titled debut album in 2001, and moved on to work with the Green House Family label. Her second album, Pure Love, was released in 2003. In 2004 she performed at the Rebel Salute festival. Her third album, Away From Babylon, was released in 2004, and Destiny followed in 2005. In 2008 she performed at many reggae festivals in North America, headlining the Northwest World Music festival in Eugene, Oregon. In 2009 she toured Brazil and France. In 2010 she recorded with Jah Sun on his Gravity EP and toured with Marcia Griffiths.

In 2023, she gained viral popularity after her song "No Love Dubplate", with Swiss DJ/music producer Little Lion Sound, gained more than 45 million views on YouTube. In response to the success she said to fans, "You have made this a hit and I'am so grateful. Many years of hard work not looking for hype but more to connect people globally through my music... For this I'm humbled and grateful." She is featured on Hungarian singer Azahriah's song "four moods 2".

During her European tour in the 2022 and 2023 festival seasons, Queen Omega caused controversy with statements on stage in which she described the COVID-19 pandemic as a “plandemic” and as having been made up by governments.

== Discography ==
- Queen Omega (2001), Jet Star
- Pure Love (2003), Green House Family/Jet Star
- Away From Babylon (2004), Charm/Jet Star
- Destiny (2005), Nocturne/Special Delivery
- Servant of Jah Army (2008), Ariwa
- Together We Aspire, Together We Achieve (2012), Greatest Friends Records
- Freedom Legacy (2023), Lions Flow Productions under exclusive license to Baco Music
