= Yami Bolo =

Jamaican reggae singer

- Born: Rolando Ephraim McLean; 1 October 1970 (age 55)
- Origin: Jamaica
- Genres: Reggae
- Years active: 1986–present
- Label: Yam Euphony
- Website: www.yamibolo.com

Rolando Ephraim McLean (born 1 October 1970), better known as Yami Bolo, is a Jamaican roots reggae singer dealing in conscious cultural meditative themes.

== Biography ==
Yami Bolo grew up in postal zone 13 of Kingston. His first professional job and exposure was with Sugar Minott's Youth Promotion Crew. His first singles were released in 1986, produced by Minott, and he had his greatest success working with Augustus Pablo in the late 1980s and early 1990s, on singles such as "Struggle in Babylon", released on Pablo's own Rockers International label. In 1994, Bolo earned international acclaim from his collaboration with Japanese reggae performer, Kazafumi Mizayawa (Miya). Their Love Is Dangerous album sold 500,000 units in Japan. In addition, the duo's "Miya-Yami Project" earned the Japanese "Best Music Video '94" title.

He contributed to Damian Marley's 2001 Grammy Award winning album Halfway Tree (2002 Best Reggae Album).

Bolo has collaborated with some of reggae's most prominent artists and producers; including Damian Marley, Tenor Saw, Sugar Minott, Capleton, Tapper Zukie, Sly and Robbie, and King Jammy's Studios. His success as a reggae artist has allowed him to record many songs professing Rastafari knowledge, referring also to the Ethiopian Orthodox Church, throughout his three decades in the reggae industry. Yami Bolo has been performing Rastafarian works since the mid-1980s touring with many different reggae groups including Augustus Pablo's Rockers crew.

His conscious Rastafari music is listened to around the world, particularly in reggae niche markets such as Japan, Australia, Britain, France, USA and Germany, chanting his aware lyrics about spiritual life, or focusing on geo-political themes of righteousness, such as his compositions protesting blood diamond trade and cobalt mining exploitation. As an ambassador for reggae, Yami Bolo conducted Rastafari cultural studies at world-renowned universities, like SUNY in New York State and MIT in Cambridge, Massachusetts. In addition, Yami Bolo has supported the city of New Orleans and its surrounding areas by volunteering his musical talent at live performances in Louisiana in the Summer of 2009.

In 2014, he was reportedly recording a new album, to be called The Singer.

== Discography ==
Albums

- Jah Made Them All (Rockers, 1990)
- He Who Knows It Feels It (Heartbeat, 1991)
- Up Life Street (Heartbeat, 1992)
- Fighting for Peace (RAS, 1994)
- Wonders and Sign (Super Power, 1997)
- Wisdom Cry (IMAJ, 1998)
- No Surrender (Jet Star Records, 1998)
- Jah Love (VP Records, 1998)
- Freedom and Liberation (Tabou 1, 1999)
- Healing of All Nations (Roots Foundation, 2001)

EPs

- Blood Diamonds Dub Set (Gold Moor Sound, 2008)

Singles

- "Blood Diamonds" (Gold Moor Sound, 2008)
- "Bloody Coltan" (Gold Moor Sound, 2011)

== See also ==
- List of reggae musicians
