= Linval Thompson =

Jamaican reggae and dub musician (born 1954)

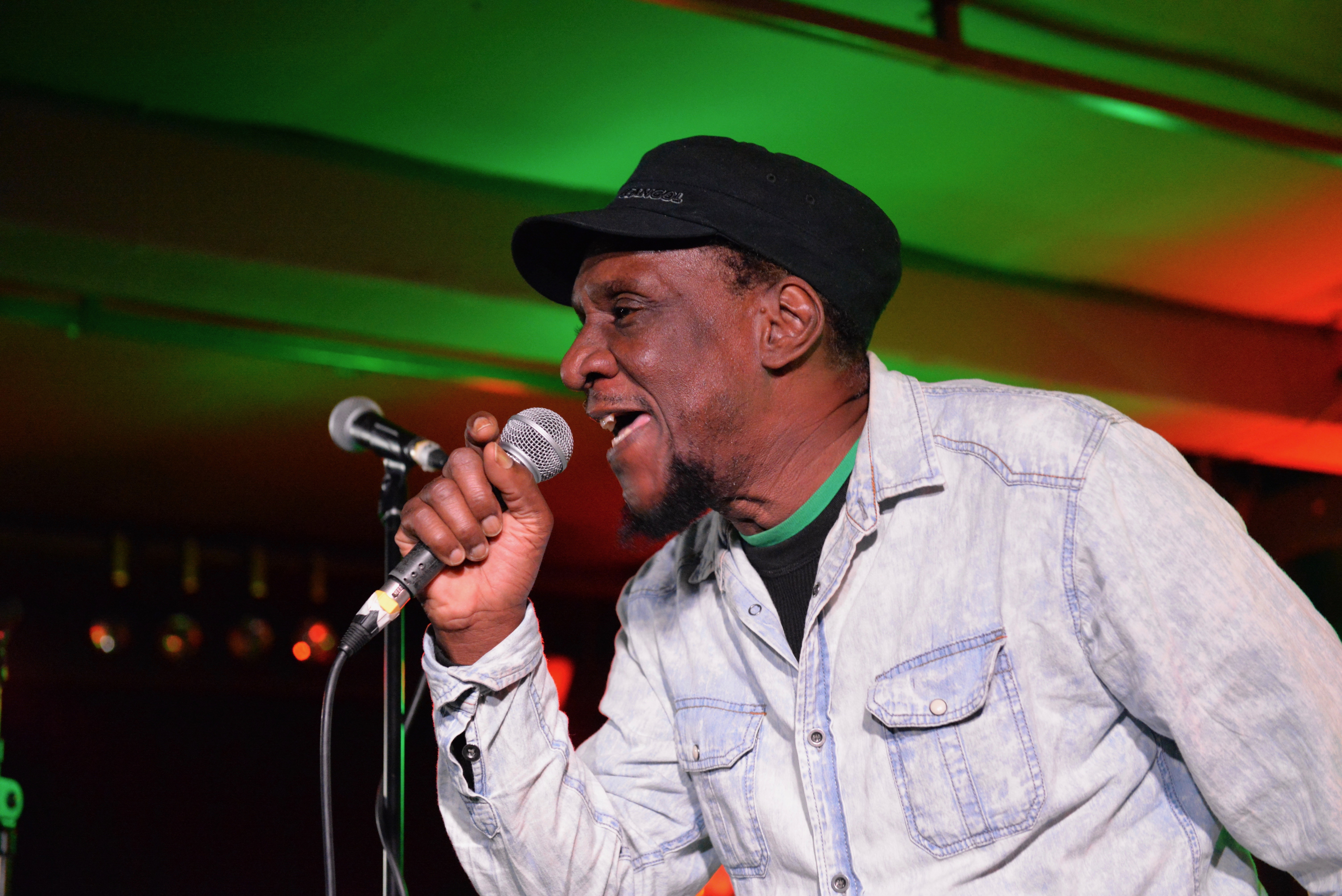
- Thompson performing in Belgium in 2018

Background information
- Born: Leval Alphonso Thompson; 12 October 1954 (age 71); Kingston, Jamaica
- Genres: Reggae, Dub
- Occupations: Musician, singer, record producer, sound engineer.
- Years active: 1970s–present
- Labels: Trojan Records; Greensleeves Records

Leval Alphonso Thompson (born 12 October 1954, Kingston, Jamaica), also known as Linval Thompson, is a Jamaican conscious roots reggae vocalist, dub musician and record producer.

== Biography ==
Thompson was raised in Kingston, Jamaica, but spent time with his mother in Queens, New York City, and his recording career began around the age of 20 with the self-released "No Other Woman," recorded in Brooklyn, New York. Returning to Jamaica in the mid-1970s he recorded with Phil Pratt, only to return to New York to study engineering. Returning again to Jamaica, he worked with Lee "Scratch" Perry at his Black Ark studio, recording "Kung Fu Man", and recorded with Bunny Lee, which resulted in his debut album, Don't Cut Off Your Dreadlocks, in 1976. Thompson began to produce his own material, the first releases being the Trojan album I Love Marijuana (1978), and its dub counterpart Negrea Love Dub. Although he continued to work as a singer, he became increasingly prominent as a producer, working with key artists of the late roots and early dancehall era such as Dennis Brown, Cornell Campbell, The Wailing Souls, Barrington Levy and Trinity, with releases through Trojan Records as well as his own Strong Like Sampson and Thompson Koos record labels.

In 2000, Steve Barrow and Mick Hucknall re-released Thompson's hitherto rare and largely unavailable Bunny Lee vocal and dubwise discomixes on an album on their Blood and Fire label entitled Ride On Dreadlocks 1975–77, thereby introducing generations of new listeners to his music. Thompson's productions were also used as the basis of some of Scientist's best-known dub albums. He has also produced albums for Eek-A-Mouse, Freddie McGregor, Ranking Dread, and The Viceroys.

== See also ==
- Dub music
- List of reggae musicians
- List of roots reggae artists
