= Mo'Kalamity =

French-Cape Verdean singer

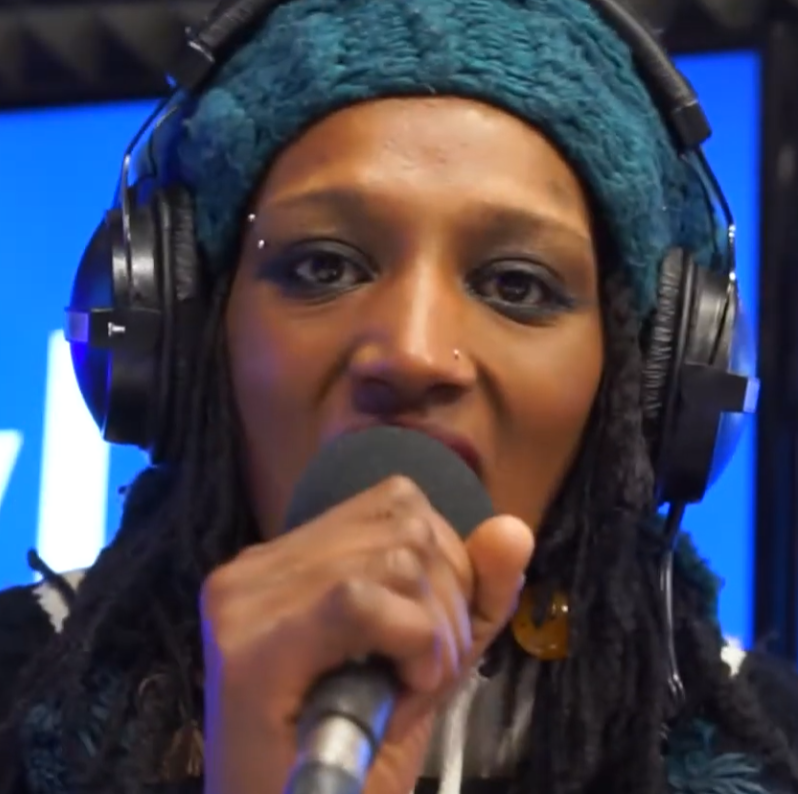
- Mo'Kalamity in 2018

Background information
- Born: Monica Tavares; Cape Verde
- Genres: Roots reggae

Monica Tavares, known professionally as Mo'Kalamity, is a French-Cape Verdean roots reggae singer-songwriter, producer, and composer. She has performed many concerts accompanied by her band, the Wizards.

== Biography ==
Born on the island of Santiago in Cape Verde, Monica Tavares and her family moved to France when she was 5 years old to seek better living standards. She grew up in the Paris region, and began singing as a child in church choirs. Tavares first began attending concerts after she finished secondary school, through which she fell in love with reggae music. Speaking of this, she said "Not only did I appreciate the rhythm, the groove, but I recognized myself in all these Jamaican artists who, in their lyrics, claimed their African origins. That's what helped to appeal to me: they have always felt proud to be African". Self-taught, she began jamming and writing music while at university (where she studied social anthropology).

Tavares first began performing on stage in the early 2000s as a backing vocalist for reggae artist King Malik, and in 2004 formed her own band called "the Wizards". Her stage name, "Mo'Kalamity", is a portmanteau of her first name ("Mo'") and "Kalamity", derived from Calamity Jane (a figure from the American frontier), which she chose to embody the "militant spirit" in a male-dominated scene with which she seeks to infuse her music. Tavares' debut album, Warrior of Lights, was self-produced, and released in 2007. She returned to Cape Verde in 2010 to perform at the Festival de Baía das Gatas on the island of São Vicente. Tavares' second album, Deeper Revolution, was released in 2009 and received three nominations at the 2011 Cabo Verde Music Awards. Previously having been signed to Lassospikante, she founded her own label, Sofia-Théa Records, and learnt guitar for her third album, Freedom of the Soul, released in 2013. She has performed with the Wizards at many concerts worldwide (such as France, Morocco, and Côte d'Ivoire), including as an opening act for Malian singer-songwriter Salif Keita. In 2017 Tavares travelled to Kingston, Jamaica, where she collaborated with producer-duo Sly & Robbie (who she first met at the Garance Reggae Festival) for her fourth album, Mo'Kalamity Meets Sly & Robbie – One Love Vibration, released in 2018. Recorded in Kingston, her fifth album, Shine, was released in 2024.

== Artistry ==
Themes found in Tavares' music include African unity and women's rights. She has stated that she loves late-1970s reggae in particular and cites Bob Marley, Burning Spear, The Gladiators, The Congos, and Otis Redding as influences. She also said that she takes inspiration from African music (especially Mandinka music), blues, gospel, R&B, and jazz.

== Discography ==
- Warrior of Lights (2007)
- Deeper Revolution (2009)
- Freedom of the Soul (2013)
- Mo'Kalamity Meets Sly & Robbie – One Love Vibration (2018)
- Shine (2024)
