= Loose Caboose =

Reggae band

- Origin: Massachusetts, United States
- Genres: Reggae
- Years active: 1972-
- Members: Ras Jahn Bullock, Jonathan Dorr
- Past members: Allyn Dorr, David Boatwright, Jim Cheney, Boo Pearson, Luke Ehrlic, Nori Ikegame, Toru, Randell, Ras Ravin, Derrick.

Loose Caboose is a reggae band from Massachusetts, United States. Formed in January 1972 as Road Hog, in 1975 the band changed their name to The Alan Fuller Band. The band was inspired by the likes of Bob Marley, Jimmy Cliff and other reggae visionaries. The band's goal was to bring reggae to the Northeastern US. In 1996, Loose Caboose was a part of the induction of Bob Marley into the Rock and Roll Hall of Fame and was the first reggae band to ever play the venue. Electric instruments were not allowed to be played that night except bass at a low level. Ras Ravin & Ras Jahn (Hand Drums), Johnathan Door (Acoustic Guitar), Toru (bass), & Nori Ikegame (Claves) performed Bob Marley's track "Rastaman Chant". Afterwards, Bob Marley historian, Roger Steffens, presented his Bob Marley video presentation.

== History ==
The band was formed in Wendell, Massachusetts with the original members: Allyn Dorr (bass), Jonathan Dorr (guitar), David Boatwright (guitar), and Jim Cheney (drums). In 1976 Boo Pearson on percussion and in 1977 Ras Jahn Bullock joined the band on percussion and backing vocals. With Ras Jahn's inspiration from Rastafari he began writing and eventually became the front man of Loose Caboose.

In 1978 Ras Jahn took his first trip to Jamaica to meet with Bob Marley and inform him of the reggae movement in the Northeastern US. His trip was successful. Inspired with his news from Jamaica, Loose Caboose continued their struggle of spreading reggae with determination.

In 1979, Bob Marley invited Ras Jahn to bring the band to Jamaica to record their first album at Tuff Gong.

In 2017, Ras Jahn died after battling liver cancer.

== Discography ==
- Dealers World (1978)
- Caboose Ha Fe Move (1995)

== See also ==
- Bob Marley
- Steel Pulse
- Black Uhuru
- Burning Spear
