= Charly B =

French singer-songwriter

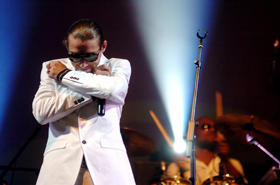
- FRENCH REGGAE SINGER CHARLY B

Background information
- Also known as: Charly B
- Born: Charles Blanvillain
- Genres: Reggae
- Occupation: Singer-songwriter
- Labels: TMMG (& VPal distribution)

Charly B, born Charles Blanvillain in 1981, is a French singer-songwriter who performs, and whose music is distributed, internationally.

== Biography ==
=== Debut ===
Charly B is French, German and Armenian descent. He was fascinated by music, and discovered reggae at the age of 15, when he spent a year at IONA High School in Jamaica, living with a Jamaican family, in a program sponsored by the American Field Service. Later on, he studied sound engineering at Recording Arts Canada in Toronto and Sound and Audio Engineering Institute in Geneva.

He composed his first reggae song at the age of 15. His musical studies in Canada, long visit to Jamaica, and time spent living in France near the Swiss border, together with his international tours, form the cultural underpinnings of his artistic vision. He has collaborated with legends of dancehall reggae such as Capleton, Kiprich, De Marco and Anthony B.

=== Career ===
In 2002, at the age of 21, he was voted best DJ in Geneva. In 2003, he wrote a song for the movie "Destination Jamaica" by George Tait (Jungle George) In December 2003, his song "My Queen" was included in a DVD distributed with the Austrian surfers' magazine Methodmag (60,000 copies). In 2005 he was voted the best DJ in Switzerland, in a contest organized by Giddeon Productions. He was not able to take advantage of the prize, a concert on the main stage of Rototom Sunsplash Festival 2005, as he had committed to visit Jamaica that summer. He therefore gave the prize to Elijah, the runner-up in the competition. In 2007, Eliane Dambre of the Ateliers du Funambule, decided to nominate him for the Eurovision competition as Switzerland's candidate, (in competition with DJ Bobo), but the attempt was made too late to qualify him for the contest. More recently, in 2009, he won an award for "Best Reggae Song" in the Reggae Europe competition. He has hundreds of songs composed by him (music and lyrics), in French and English and in Jamaican slang, registered with the French-based Society of Lyricists, Composers and Music Editors (SACEM). In February 2013, he wins a podium at the Victories of Reggae 2013 in the category "Revelation of the Year". The Jamaican newspapers "Jamaican Observer" write a great article on his career in February 2013, February being the "Reggae Month" In June 2013, he wins the Price of the Public and the best author-composer price at the Zicmeup Competition in Paris organized by Zicmeup/the Voice. In 2015, he joins the TMMG Production group in Kingston and gets a VPal distribution for his single Prophecies Untold, followed in 2016 by "Eyes dem Red" and "Nah Give Up", and in 2017 by "One Phone Call". This collaboration between TMMG and Charly B has led to an album, being released at the end of 2017, with 14 tracks, called JOURNEY OF LIFE.

=== Studios in Jamaica ===
2009-2015: In summer 2009, after winning a competition with Reggae Europe with his song "My Sound", Reggae Europe offered the artist to do some recordings and videos at Geejam Studios in Jamaica. He there had the opportunity to meet with Jon Baker and his team, and several of the artists who recorded there (Grace Jones, Drake, Diplo, Katy Perry, Alicia Keys, John Legend, No Doubt, Lily Allen, Amy Winehouse, Florence and the Machine, Alborosie etc. etc. He recorded there the "Forever" album. In 2015, he starts recording a new reggae album with TMMG, which will see the light at the end of 2017.

=== Encounters, tours and international invitations ===
Between 2009 and 2015, he meets and/or works with many artists, the Jolly Boys, Alborosie, the Shengen Clan, Agent Sasco (Assassin), Chronixx, 2Chainz, Mystic Davis (Aidonia) and many others. He is invited to perform and tour in Spain, Germany, Canada, the United States and Vietnam (Cama Festival and more). During that period, he also makes several videos, among which Ooh No (2009), The Way you wine (2009), Forever (2010), Everything OK (2012), Gypsy (2013), Prophecies Untold (2015), Nah Give Up (2016).

== Discography ==
=== Albums ===
- 2000 : Chu-chu Stylordz Production – Canada
- 2001 : Move Stylordz Production – Canada
- 2002 : Vengeance to God Ladies Party
- 2003 : My Queen Pow Pow records – MethodMag – Europe
- 2004 : Album Reality Redhemption Production
- 2004 : Album More Reality Redhemption Production
- 2005 : Album Thugz Style Severely III Production, La plus belle femme (Video clip on TVM3)
- 2006 : Album Family Affair Redhumption Production, Several titles in album Hemp Higher Sound
- 2007 : Album International Ting – Charly B and the Official Band
- 2008 : Album Zulu Nation Stylordz Production – Canada (Amazon.com an E-music.com)
- 2009 : Several titles in the album Redhemption Sound fi All Africans
- 2010 : Album Tomorrow is just another day (with Henry P.).
- 2012: Album "Forever" French Edition released on 29 October 2012.
- 2015: Single "Prophecies untold" (TMMG/VPal)
- 2016: Single "Eyes dem Red" (TMMG/VPal)
- 2016: Single "Nah Give Up" (TMMG/VPal)
- 2017: Single "One Phone Call" (TMMG/VPal)

end 2017 will see the release of JOURNEY OF LIFE, 14 tracks Album, collaboration of the artist and TMMG

=== Singles ===
- Rock and come in
- Le rêveur
- The dreamer
- Brown Eyes
- "Prophecies Untold"
- "Eyes dem Red"
- "Nah Give Up"
- "One Phone Call"

== Video clips ==
- Chu-chu – shot in Canada
- La plus belle femme – shot in Nyon, Switzerland
- On s'empare de la party – shot with La Dixion in Switzerland
- The way you wine- shot in Port Antonio in Jamaica by the studios Geejam
- Ooh No – shot in Toronto au Canada
- Two documentary videos – shot in Port Antonio en Jamaica
- Documentary video shot in New York November 2009 for the anniversary of Zulu Nation
- Vidéo of the radio interview in Toronto, Canada
- Forever – shot in Port Antonio, Jamaica in September 2010.
- Video of the ROTOTOM Sunsplash festival concert in August 2010
- "Everything OK" - shot in Port Antonio, Jamaica, 2012
- "Gipsy" - shot at Trident Castle, Jamaica, 2013
- "Prophecies Untold" - shot between Portland and Kingston, Jamaica, 2015
- "Nah Give Up" - shot in Blue Mountain, Jamaica, 2016

== TV Program ==
- 2016 – 15 July: Live on CVM TV at D’Wrap entertainment and lifestyle show
- 2016 – 24 May: Live on CVM TV at Sunrise
- "Interview of Charly B by Winford Williams" 2016 – May 14 : Live at "On Stage" programme on TV Jamaica
- "Special Charly B" on TVM3's TRIBBU show, presented by Philippe Morax (on the air 2005 Nov. 1, from 18h to 19h30).

== Shows ==
- 2015-2016 - Various shows and festivals in Jamaica and the Caribbeans - check list on "Charly B's personal website (events)"
- Summer 2003 – Sunrise Festival of Bagnols-sur-Ceze (France)
- 7 January 2005 – Stadium of Sembrancher, Switzerland
- 10 February 2005 – The Hacienda, Chambéry, France
- 3 March 2005 – The Safari Bar – Chamonix, France
- 22 April 2005 – No'Limit – Courchevel, France
- 13 May 2005 Le matin bleu, Annecy, France
- 4 June 2005 – Salzhaus – Winterthur, Switzerland – Singjay Contest 2005
- 10 June 2005 – Schiffbau, Zurich, Switzerland
- 14–20 Nov. 2005 -Palexpo, Fair of Geneva, Switzerland (first part of Michel Fugain)
- 15 June 2005 – Reggae Radio Zurich, Switzerland – Radio show – final – Swiss Singjay Contest
- 27 August 2005 – Turatznurg – Zollikon, Switzerland
- 9 September 2005 – Flon Jugendkulturraum – St. Gallen, Switzerland
- 10 September 2005 – Salle du Séminaire – Porrentruy, Switzerland
- 21 September 2005 – Doors 72 – Bienne, Switzerland
- 18 November 2005 – Bist'rock café, Geneva, Switzerland
- 25 January 2006 – L'auberge du télé – Contamines, Montjoie, France
- 7 January 2006 – Gaskessel – La Coupole – Bienne, Switzerland
- 25 January 2006 – Contamines Montjoie, France
- 18 February 2006 – Alte Kaserne, Zürich, Switzerland
- 17 March 2006 – L'arcade – Geneva, Switzerland
- 6 April 2006 – Piment Rouge – Artamis, Geneva, Switzerland
- 28 April 2006 – Flon Jugendkulturraum – St. Gallen Switzerland
- 29 April 2006 – Sputnik – Mettmenstetten, Switzerland
- 27 May 2006 – Kulturzentrum Schützi – Olten, Switzerland
- 30 September 2006 – La Coupole Bienne, Switzerland
- 20 October 2006 – Ex-Cubitano, Zurich, Switzerland
- 20 December 2006 – Le Chat Noir, Geneva, Switzerland
- 30 December 2006 Arcade, Geneva, Switzerland
- 5 January 2007 Piment Rouge, Geneva(1st part of Yannis Odua), Switzerland
- 6 January 2007 Cosy Bay, Lausanne, Switzerland
- 13 January 2007 KBar Geneva, Switzerland
- 19 January 2007 Loft – Crans Montana, Switzerland
- 26 January 2007 – Loft, Crans Montana, Switzerland
- 2 March 2007 Thyon les Collons (VS) Switzerland
- 9 February 2007 – Doors 72 – Bienne, Switzerland
- 22 February 2007 Matin Bleu, Annecy, France
- 24 February 2007, Gringo Club, Villars, Switzerland
- 2 March 2007 Kbar, Geneva, Switzerland
- 9 mars 2007 – Jet d'eau – Le bateau Geneva, Switzerland
- 10 March 2007 Blue Moon Café, Logras, Rhône Alpes, France
- 24 March 2007 Stand up festival, Bühlhalle, Switzerland
- 20 April 2007 Kbar Geneva, Switzerland
- 26 April 2007 Zélig, Dorigny, Lausanne, Switzerland
- 27 April 2007 Le matin Bleu, Geneva, Switzerland)
- Mai 2007: Concert au cours du Spectacle annuel des Ateliers du Funambule au théâtre de Terre-Sainte à Coppet, Switzerland
- 7–10 June 2007 – Caribana FESTIVAL – Nyon Switzerland
- 30 June 2007 – Piment Rouge, Geneva, Switzerland
- 12 October 2007 Usine de Nyon – Nyon, Switzerland
- 7 December 2007 – Alte Kaserne, Zurich, Switzerland
- 2 February 2008 – Gaskessel – La Coupole, Bienne, Switzerland
- 16 February 2008 – Cosmos, Thyon les Collons – VS, Switzerland
- 14 June 2008 – Rote Fabrik, Zurich, Switzerland
- 16 August 2008 – Lakesplash – Seematte Twaan, Switzerland
- 15 September 2007 – Snowboard contest Tignes, France
- 2 February 2008 – Concert à Gaskessel, Bern, Switzerland
- 15 November 2008 – C.e.r.m – Martigny, Switzerland
- 21 November 2008 – La Coupole, Bienne – Switzerland
- 24 December 2008 – Alte Kaserne – Zurich – Switzerland
- 24 April 2009 Celtic Tavern, Aurillac, France
- 8 January 2009 – KAB de l'usine – GenevaSwitzerland
- 9 January 2009 – Bar59 – Luzern Switzerland
- 10 April 2009 – Regg'Ain Festival, Segny, France
- 27 June 2009 – Sky club – Nyon Switzerland
- 10 October 2009 – Leipzig (Allemagne)
- November 2009 – New York (USA) (Anniversary Zulu Nation – Bronx) and Toronto *12 December 2009 – Bar 59 – Luzern Switzerland
- 19 December 2009 – Bashment – GenevaSwitzerland
- 26 December 2009 – Rockinton Music Pub – Thonon les bains (France)
- 27 March 2010 Les Contamines Montjoie, France
- 1–27 Mai 2010 – Vietnam Tour between Hanoï and Ho Chi Minh City, Vietnam
- 28 May 2010 – Reggae dancehall party – Saint-Genis, France
- 23 July 2010 – Siroco Club – Barcelona, Spain
- 24 August 2010 – ROTOTOM SUNSPLASH FESTIVAL 2010 in Benicassim in Spain
- 27 November 2010 – Crystal Club, Port Antonio (Jamaica)
- 26 February 2011 – Success Prod – St Genis (France) with Inout Experience Band from Paris
