= Little Hero =

- Born: Paul Nathaniel Gayle; 1972 (age 52–53); Farm Town, Discovery Bay, St Ann, Jamaica
- Genres: Reggae
- Years active: 1992–present
- Labels: Inspire

Paul Nathaniel Gayle (born 1972), better known by his stage name Little Hero, is a Jamaican reggae singer.

Born in Farm Town, Discovery Bay, in St Ann, Little Hero emerged in the early-1990s, first recording with producer Courtney Cole in 1992, and had his first major success in 1994 with the Jamaican number one single "God Alone", a collaboration with Merciless and Action Fire.

His debut album, Revelation, was released in 2007 (initially in Japan) and entered the Billboard Top Reggae Albums chart at number one. He was reported to be working on a second album called More Love in 2011. He had success in Jamaica with singles such as "Inna De Ghetto", and released his latest album, The Oracle Unleashed, in 2013.

Gayle's brother is the musician PZ.

== Discography ==
- Revelation (2007), Diamond Edge/Inspire
- The Oracle Unleashed (2013)
