= No-Maddz =

The No-Maddz
- Origin: Kingston, Jamaica
- Genres: Dub poetry, reggae, reggae fusion
- Years active: 2010–present
- Members: Everaldo Creary; Sheldon Shepherd
- Past members: Christopher Downer; Christopher Gordon; Everaldo Creary; Oneil Peart; Sheldon Shepherd
- Website: thenomaddz.com

The No-Maddz is a Jamaican art collective and roots reggae dub poetry band consisting of Sheldon "Sheppie" Shepherd and Everaldo "Evie" Creary. Both are recipients of the prestigious Jamaican Prime Minister's Youth Award for Excellence in Arts and Culture. Their sound is a fusion of a unique dub poetry style with multiple music genres and it carries the spirit of Jamaica's roots music.

== History ==
The members are alumni of Kingston College, Jamaica and are recipients of the Jamaican Prime Minister's Youth Award for excellence, received in 2005, 2006, 2007, and 2009, the highest state award for youths in the country.

In 2010, the group commenced their signature concert series 'The Trod Live' around Kingston and St. Andrew and recorded the first Jamaican produced live album of the new millenenium.

The group signed an endorsement deal with Puma in 2011. The record-breaking Puma FAAS campaign with Usain Bolt became the highest sales for a second quarter in the company's history. The series of adverts were aired on MTV, VH1, TBS, CW (in the United States of America) amongst others worldwide. Also, the adverts played in every Footlocker and Puma store worldwide.

They received a perfect score in the annual Jamaica Cultural Development Commission's performance arts festival.

Shepherd and Creary featured in the film Better Mus' Come, for which Shepherd won a Best Actor award at the American Black Film Festival.

In June 2012, they launched their single "Sort out You Life Jamaica", commemorating 50 years of Jamaican independence.

The group have performed at several of Jamaica's major festivals, including Rebel Salute, Reggae Sumfest and The National Grand Gala. In an April 2013 Rolling Stone magazine article Chris Blackwell, founder of Island Records, stated "There's a band called the No-Maddz who are more like theater than a group. They're actors. It's this whole audio-visual kind of thing. It's different. But they're really good, really talented and really smart."

In mid 2013, they launched the production Breadfruit is the New Bread, Baby, a theatrical expression of the No-Maddz "Bongo Music" that ran for five nights per week for two months; It was later selected by the government as an official representation of Jamaica's performing arts and new popular culture at Carifesta XI in South America.

The Trod Live series was revamped for the re-opening of the historic CountrySide Club in Kingston. The special series saw the band playing every last Saturday for four months.

In 2014, No-Maddz teamed up with producers Sly and Robbie to record their first studio album entitled Sly and Robbie presents No-Maddz. The album was released on 27 January 2015. Saxon Baird of MTV Iggy described the album as "a first-rate debut from a band that seems poised to offer great things to come." In a review, Eric Magni of United Reggae wrote that it the album was "a joy from start to finish."

In April 2015, In The Morning Yah, a book of Shepherd's poetry, was published.

In 2016, the band released three new singles, "Promises", "Unite Us" and "Breadfruit and Banana". In late 2016, they visited Japan for the World Music Festival in Hamamatsu. The same year, The No-Maddz became a two-member band, comprising Sheldon "Sheppie" Shepherd and Everaldo "Evie" Creary.

== Discography ==
=== Albums ===
- The Trod - Live!! (2010)
- Sly and Robbie Presents No-maddz!! (2015)
- Heaven on Earth (2019)

=== EPs ===
- Sort Yuh Life Jamaica (2012)
- New Bread Order (2013)

=== Singles ===
- "Rise Above Profanity" (2011)
- "Shotta" (2014)
- "Clarkz Like Dis" (2018)

== Videos ==
- "The Trod" - (Live video)
- "Sort Out Yuh Life Jamaica" - (Jamaica 50th Anniversary)
- "Face My Fears"
- "PUMA Faas - Blam Blam" - (Advert spot #1)
- "PUMA Faas - Recording" - (Advert spot #2)
- "PUMA Faas - Shut It" - (Advert spot #3)
- "Shotta" (2014)
- "Clarkz Like Dis" (2018)
