= Jah Warrior =

British record label

Jah Warrior is a United Kingdom roots reggae/dub production team, record label, sound system, and musical group centred on Steve Mosco.

== Overview ==
Mosco first got interested in reggae as a teenager in Manchester. He started attending sound system events in Moss Side and Hulme, before travelling further afield, experiencing the likes of Jah Shaka. In 1981 he moved to London and was invited by Tim Westwood to do a reggae show on a pirate radio station called LWR. He also worked as a selector on the Humble Lion sound system, which in 1987 was renamed Jah Warrior. In 1990 he put out an album called Warrior Dub under the name Zulu Warriors. In 1995 he started the Jah Warrior record label, the first release being "The 22nd Book" by Naph-Tali, followed by the album One of These Days. Since 1999, he has concentrated on production.

He has since produced albums by artists such as Hughie Izachaar, Tena Stelin, Prince Alla, Peter Broggs, Trinity, Dillinger, Rod Taylor, U Brown, Alton Ellis, Anthony Johnson, Dennis Alcapone, Horace Andy, and Jah Mason, as well as dub releases as Jah Warrior, working with Dougie Wardrop (aka A. Millgate), and Jah Warrior has become one of the leading independent roots and reggae labels in the UK. His Dub From The Heart series of albums are considered some of the most interesting examples of that genre from the mid to late 1990s.

Jah Warrior's first release in the United States was Peter Broggs' Jah Golden Throne Dubwise album on the BSI label.
