= The Viceroys (musical group) =

Jamaican reggae vocal group

- Also known as: The Voiceroys; The Interns; The Inturns; The Brothers; The Hot Tops; Truth Fact & Correct
- Origin: Kingston, Jamaica
- Genres: Rocksteady, reggae
- Years active: 1966–1984, c.2004–present
- Labels: Studio One, Trojan, Greensleeves, Makasound
- Members: Wesley Tinglin (Deceased); Neville Ingram (Deceased); Michael Gabbidon; Andrew Coombs
- Past members: Daniel Bernard; Bunny Gayle; Norris Reid; Chris Wayne

The Viceroys, also known as The Voiceroys, The Interns, The Inturns, The Brothers, and The Hot Tops, are a conscious roots reggae vocal group who first recorded in 1967. After releasing several albums in the late 1970s and early 1980s, they split up in the mid-1980s. They reformed and recorded a new album in 2006.

== History ==
The group was formed in Kingston, Jamaica by Wesley Tinglin, along with Daniel Bernard and Bunny Gayle, and after auditioning unsuccessfully for Duke Reid, the trio made their debut recording for producer Clement "Coxsone" Dodd in the middle of the rocksteady era in 1967. The group recorded several singles for Dodd's Studio One label, including "Ya Ho", "Fat Fish", and "Love & Unity", and these tracks were collected together by Heartbeat Records for a 1995 compilation album. They went on to record for several other producers in the late 1960s and 1970s, including Derrick Morgan, Winston Riley (who produced their hit "Mission Impossible"), Lee "Scratch" Perry (including "Babylon Deh Pon Fire", which was credited to Truth Fact & Correct), Lloyd Daley, and Micron Music's Pete Weston. They also returned to record at Studio One in the late 1970s. Gayle left, with Neville Ingram taking his place. In 1980 Bernard also left, with Norris Reid joining (Reid also recorded as a solo artist, releasing Give Jah the Praises in 1979 and Roots & Vine in 1988).

The band's first album release was the Phil Pratt-produced Consider Yourself (1978), originally credited to their alias The Interns and later released as Ya Ho, credited to The Viceroys. They had a big hit in Jamaica in 1980 with the Sly & Robbie-produced "Heart Made of Stone" vocal and dub discomix. Other popular records they released at the time were the discomix Linval Thompson production, "Rise in the Strength of Jah" and "Love is the Key", the latter recorded with Errol Flabba Holt and Style Scott of the Roots Radics. Their first album released as the Viceroys was the Linval Thompson production We Must Unite, released in 1982 by Trojan Records, and featuring the Roots Radics. Thompson also produced their 1983 album Brethren and Sistren, and in 1984 they moved on to work again with Winston Riley on the Chancery Lane album, by which time Reid had left to concentrate on his solo career, Chris Wayne taking his place. A further album was started but was not released, the group splitting up before it was finished. It was eventually released in 2004 as Love Is All, with a few new tracks added. Wayne subsequently recorded as a solo artist, releasing three albums in the late 1980s and early 1990s. 2000 saw the original trio get back together for a short lived reunion to rerecord some of their classics and release the cd The Original Voiceroys Revisited.

After a period of inactivity, Tinglin revived the group with Ingram and new member Michael Gabbidon, and they recorded a new album in 2006, a live recording from Earl "Chinna" Smith's yard in French label Makasound's Inna de Yard series.

Tinglin died on 18 September 2018, aged 75, after suffering from lung cancer.

== Discography ==
- Consider Yourself (1978), Chanan-Jah - originally credited as The Inturns (also issued as Do We Have to Fight), reissued in 1979 as Detour, credited as The Interns, and in 1985 as Ya Ho, credited to The Viceroys
- We Must Unite (1982), Trojan - UK Indie #29
- Brethren and Sistren (1983), CSA
- Chancery Lane (1984), Greensleeves
- The Original VoiceRoys Revisited (2000), LGB
- Love Is All (2004), Sankofa
- Inna de Yard (2006), Makasound
- Memories-Iroko Showcase Vol 2 (2016), Iroko
- Why (2018), Luckee Riddims

Compilations

- Ya Ho (Viceroys at Studio One) (1995), Heartbeat
- Slogan on the Wall (2003), Vice Music
