= Meta & The Cornerstones =

Reggae band

- Origin: Senegal; New York City, U.S.
- Genres: Roots reggae; African reggae; Afropop; soul; World music
- Years active: 2006–present
- Labels: 54 Soundz; VP Records; Baco Records; Metarize Music Group LLC
- Members: Meta Dia; Rupert McKenzie; Simon Roger; Bastien Belmokadem
- Past members: Daniel Serrato; Shahar Mintz; Aya Kato; Wayne Fletcher
- Website: https://metaandthecornerstones.com

Meta & The Cornerstones are a reggae band led by the Senegalese front man, Meta Dia. The core of the Cornerstones consist of the Jamaican bass player Rupert McKenzie, and the French musicians Simon Roger on drums and Bastien Belmokadem on keys.

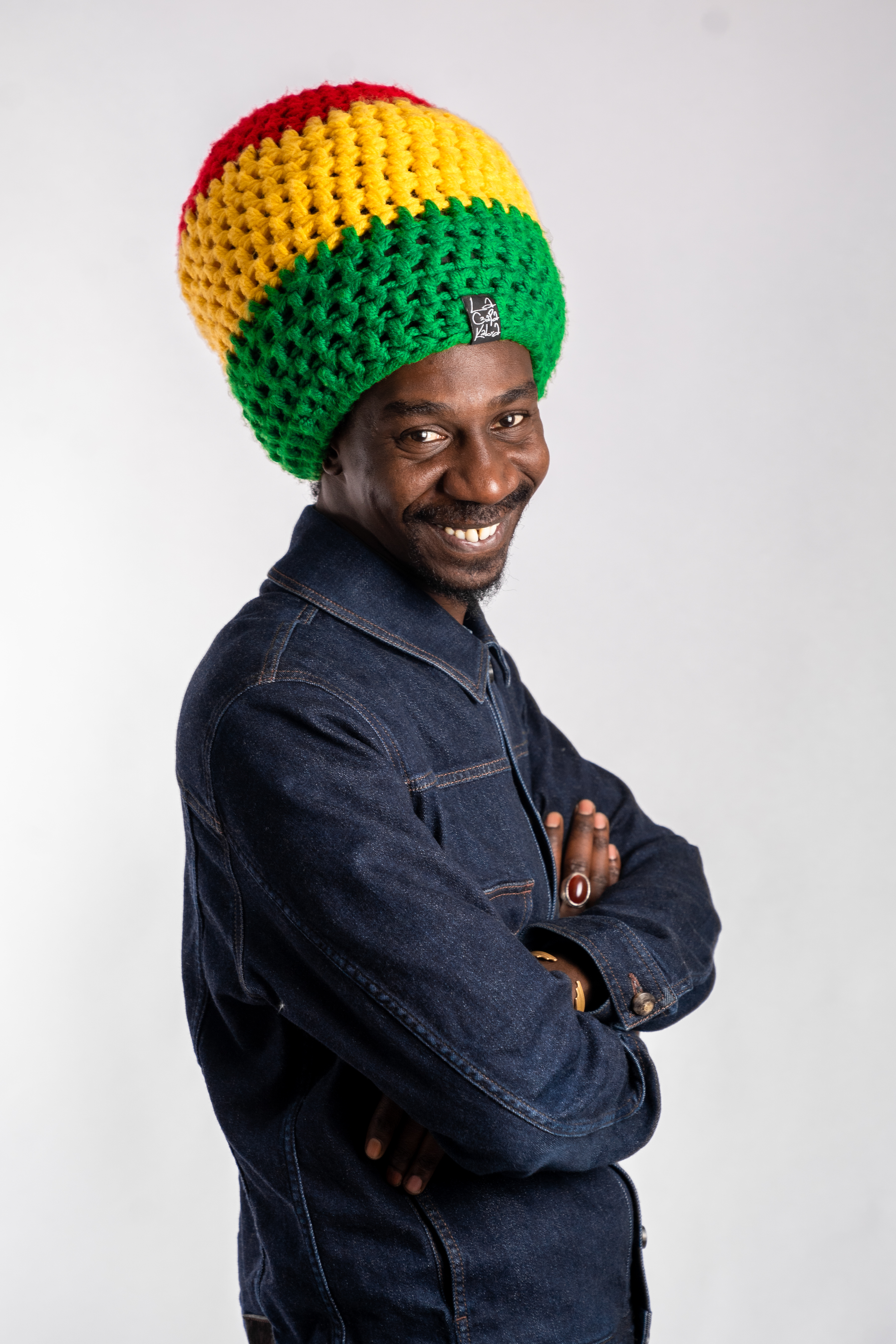
Meta Dia, singer of Meta & the Cornerstones

== History ==
Born and raised in Senegal, West Africa, Meta Dia discovered his love for reggae music at a very young age when he discovered artists like Bob Marley and Gregory Isaacs. Dia was also influenced by the musical traditions of his homeland from a very young age, such as sabar drums and the kora.

In 2002, Dia relocated to New York City where he was exposed to a mix of cultures and musical genres. Influenced by the city’s music scene, he would absorb the improvisation of jazz, the loudness of rock, the social commentary in hip-hop, and the styles of world music. It would eventually lead him to assemble a group of musicians to form The Cornerstones

In 2008 Meta and The Cornerstones released their debut album entitled “Forward Music”, which received critical acclaim. The band's song "Hello Again" was featured in the 2012 film Journey 2: The Mysterious Island.

In 2013, they released their second album "Ancient Power" which was recorded at the Tuff Gong Studios in Kingston Jamaica and co-produced by Sidney Mills (Steel Pulse). The 15-track work features artists like U-Roy, Capleton, and Damian Marley.

In 2018, Meta & the Cornerstoens released their third album "Hira". Recorded at Peter Gabriel’s Real World Studios in the UK, expertly mixed by Shane Brown of Jukeboxxx Productions and produced by Meta Dia himself, “Hira” treats the listener to 14 tracks of solid Roots Reggae which incorporates all kinds of musical flavors such as Bossa Nova, Middle Eastern sounds, Moroccan Gnaoua, classical Jazz, Flamenco, Rock, Soul and African riddims. Hira calls for religious tolerance, spiritual justice, and personal introspection. “Hira carries the potency to create meaningful and necessary change in the world through reggae music”.

Meta & The Cornerstones fourth album "DIA" pronounced "Jah" was recorded at Peter Gabriel’s renowned Real World Studios in the UK, and released with VP Records in 2021 in the midst of a Pandemic.

TMeta Dia sings lyrics in English, French, Wolof, and Fulani.

== Discography ==
=== Studio albums ===
- Forward Music (2008)
- Ancient Power (2013)
- Hira (2016)
- Dia (2021)
- Echoes of Time (2026)

=== Extended plays ===
- Zion Stereo (2014)

=== Singles ===
Title	Year	Album
"Somewhere in Africa" (feat. Peetah of Morgan Heritage)	2008	Forward Music
"My Beloved Africa" (feat. Damian Marley)	2013	Ancient Power
"Breeze"	2021	Dia
"Two Pockets"	2022	Dia
"Million Miles"	2022	Non-album single
"Lively And Up"	2024	Non-album single
"Shout It Out"	2024	Non-album single
"Good Spirit"	2025	Echoes of Time
"Ayee" (feat. Stonebwoy)	2025	Echoes of Time
