= Alpha & Omega (band) =

British reggae band

Alpha And Omega
- Origin: London/Plymouth, England, UK
- Genres: Reggae, dub
- Years active: Mid 1980s–present
- Labels: A&O, Greensleeves, ROIR, BSI
- Members: Christine Woodbridge; John Sprosen

Alpha And Omega are a roots dub duo that mix both analogue and digital elements, comprising bassist Christine Woodbridge and keyboard player John Sprosen, both of whom had played in reggae bands previously, Sprosen also having worked with the Roaring Lion Sound System. They began working together in the mid-1980s, splitting their time between their home towns of London and Plymouth, and issued their debut home-recorded cassette in 1988. They were picked up by Greensleeves Records, who acted as a parent company to the duo's A&O label, and also worked with Jah Shaka, for whom they supplied rhythm tracks. Although they are strongly influenced by artists such as Lee "Scratch" Perry, King Tubby and Augustus Pablo, they have developed a sound that has been described as "uniquely British". In a review of their Mystical Things album, Rick Anderson, writing for Allmusic, wrote: "This prolific London-based duo is responsible for some of the most convincing old-school reggae to come from the first world."

== Discography ==
- Daniel in the Lion's Den (1990) A&O01
- King & Queen (1991) A&O09
- Overstanding (1991) A&O18
- Watch and Pray (1992) A&O27/Greensleeves [CD]
- Almighty Jah (1988) A&O77 (Alpha & Omega meets Dub Judah)
- Everyday Life (1993) A&O93
- Safe in the Ark (1993) A&O/[Marketed & Distributed by Greensleeves Records Ltd.(A&OCD94)]
- The Signs (1994) BUB29 (Iries In Roots meets Alpha & Omega)
- Dubplate Selection Volume 1 (1995) A&O/Greensleeves
- Sound System Dub (1995) ROIR (compilation)
- Tree Of Life (1996) A&O096
- Voice In The Wilderness (1996) Greensleeves
- Dubplate Selection Volume 2 (1997) A&O
- The Sacred Art Of Dub (1998) (Alpha & Omega Meets The Disciples)/ Greensleeves
- Dub Magic (1999) ZGRCD001 [Selected and mastered exquisitely by Zions'Gate Records]
- Mystical Things (2000) BSI
- Dub Philosophy (2001) BSI
- Show Me a Purpose Versions (2001) Hammerbass
- Serious Joke (2001) A&O
- Spirit of the Ancients (2003) A&O (Jonah Dan + Alpha & Omega)
- Trample The Eagle And The Dragon And The Bear (2005) A&O
- Legend of A&O (2006)
- City Of Dub (2006) A&O
- Spirit of the Ancients (Part Two) (2007) ISAO2007 (Jonah Dan + Alpha & Omega)
- Songs From The Holy Mountain (2009) (featuring Jonah Dan, Paul Fox and Dan I)
- Blessed Are The Poor (2012) (Alpha & Omega meets Dan I)
- The Half That's Never Been Told (2014)
- A&O Digital Dubplates from The Half (2014)
- No Beginning No End (2016) (Alpha & Omega meets Ras Tinny)
- One By One (2017)
- Jah Guide & Protect (Remixes) (2017) (Alpha & Omega meets Indica Dubs)
- Dubplate Selection Volume 3 (2018)
- The Sacred Art Of Dub Volume 1 (2019) (Alpha & Omega meets The Disciples)
- The Sacred Art Of Dub Volume 2 (2019) (Alpha & Omega meets The Disciples)
- Shadrach, Meshach And Abednego (2020) A&O2021
