= The Silvertones =

Jamaican reggae harmony group

- Origin: Kingston, Jamaica
- Genres: Ska, rocksteady, reggae
- Years active: 1964–present
- Labels: Dr. Bird, Treasure Isle, Black Art, Trojan, Studio One
- Members: Keith Coley, Joel Oliver Brown aka Kush, Anthony Feurtado
- Past members: Delroy Denton, Gilmore Grant

The Silvertones (who also recorded as The Valentines, The Gold Tones, The Admirals and The Muskyteers) are a Jamaican reggae harmony group formed in 1964, best known for their recordings for Lee "Scratch" Perry in the early 1970s.

In 1964 three vocalists – Delroy Denton, Keith Coley, and Gilmore Grant – came together to form The Silvertones. In 1965 they had success with the singles "True Confession" and "It’s Real", both produced by Duke Reid and released on the Dr. Bird Label. The Silvertones also released "Cool Down" by Duke Reid.

In 1968, The Silvertones released a cover version of Wilson Pickett's song "In The Midnight Hour". Other singles included "Old Man River" and "Slow and Easy" on Reid's Treasure Isle label. They recorded for Sonia Pottinger "Guns Fever" and by 1971 were recording releases such as "Tear Drops Will Fall" for Clancy Eccles. Later, The Silvertones went on to record many songs for Studio One. They also recorded under the name "The Valentines", examples being "Guns Fever" (also called "Bam Bam Fever"), "Old Man Says" and "Stop the Violence".

In the late 1960s and early 1970s, the band worked with Lee "Scratch" Perry, initially as "The Muskyteers". They contributed a version of Brook Benton's "Kiddy-O" to Perry's album "The Upsetter". Perry produced their album titled "Silver Bullets", voiced at King Tubby's Studio, in one night and released it on his Black Ark Label and on Trojan Records in the UK.

Denton migrated to the United States and was replaced by Joel "Kush" Brown. In the late 1970s The Silvertones had successful singles with "I Want To Be There", "Smile", "Stop Crying", "Have a Little Faith", and "Come Forward". They worked again with Clement "Coxsone" Dodd's Studio One. The Silvertones Studio One recordings were collected together along with some of Duke Reid's productions, such as "Young at Heart", for an album in 1999.

== Discography ==
- Silver Bullets (1974) Black Art/Trojan
- Young at Heart (1999) Studio One
- Keep on Rolling (2013) Paris DJs
- Things Gonna Change (2015) Jamaica
