= Jah Mason =

Jamaican singer & deejay (born 1970)

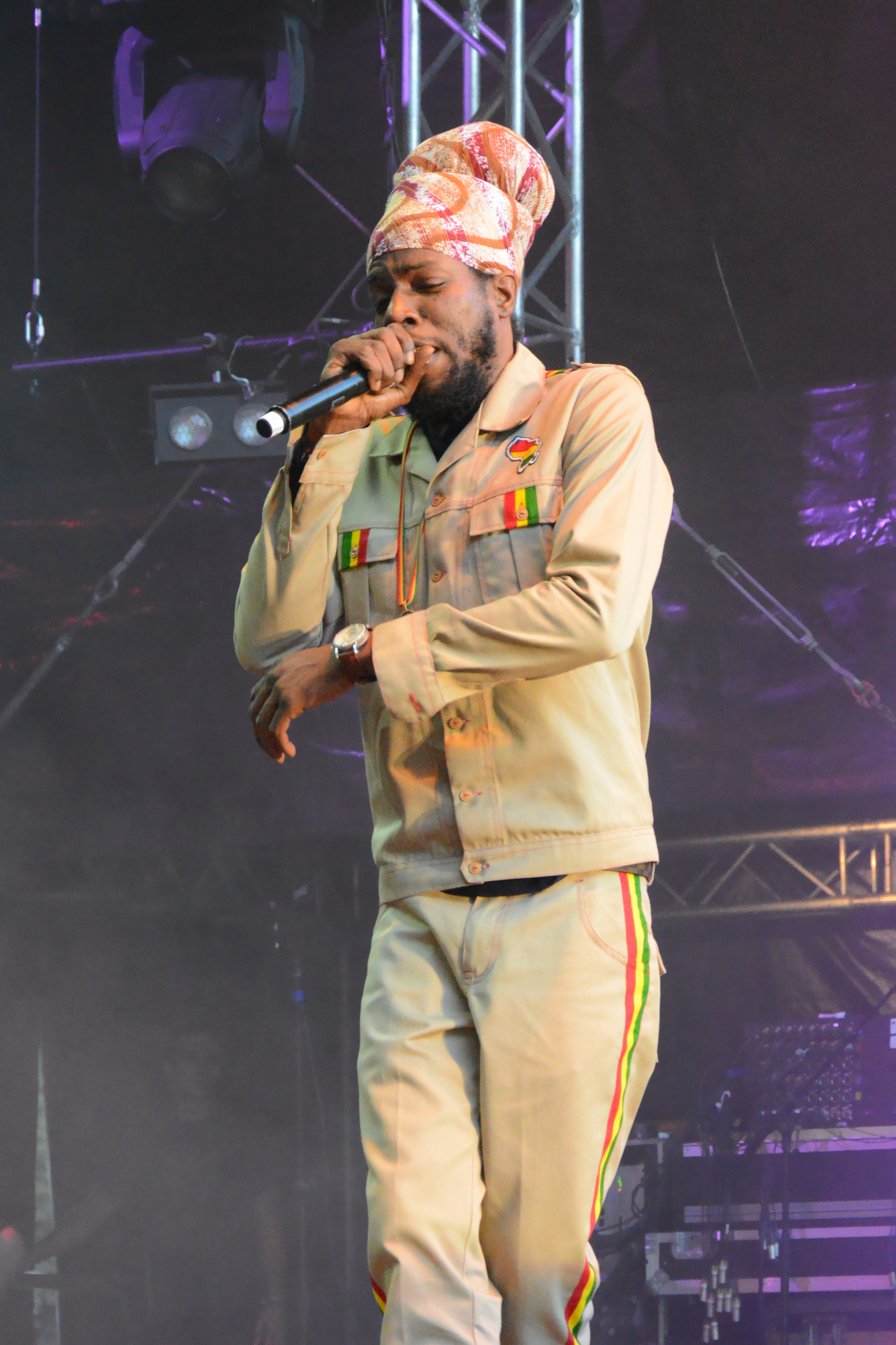
- Jah Mason in 2013

Background information
- Also known as: Fire Mason
- Born: Andre Johnson; 17 November 1970 (age 55)
- Origin: Manchester Parish, Jamaica
- Genre: Reggae
- Occupations: Singer/deejay, recording artist
- Years active: 1991–present
- Labels: New Creation Records, Jah Warrior, VP, Greensleeves

Andre Johnson (born 29 December 1970), better known by his stage name Jah Mason, also known as Fire Mason, is a reggae singer/deejay from Jamaica, active as a recording artist since 1991.

== Biography ==
Jah Mason was born in Jamaica's Manchester Parish, and grew up in a Christian family. During his childhood, he was nicknamed Perry Mason for his ability to resolve disputes, and it was under this name that his debut single "Selassie I Call We" was released in 1991 on Junior Reid's JR record label. In 1995 he joined the Bobo Ashanti order of the Rastafari movement, and began performing and recording as Jah Mason after linking up with the David House group. He had hits in Jamaica with "My Princess Gone" and "Lion Look", and also made guest appearances on singles by his friend Jah Cure. His first albums came in 2002 with Keep Your Joy and Working So Hard. Since then he has released albums at a rate of more than one a year, including Wheat and Tears and Princess Gone...The Saga Bed, both released in 2006 on Greensleeves Records and VP Records respectively, and the latter distributed by Warners. The Jamaica Gleaner, reviewing Wheat and Tears, commented on a lack of originality in Jah Mason's work but went on to say "clichés notwithstanding, the album is musical, and for hardcore reggae fans, the disc should provide enough of a vibe to chill with." David Jeffries of AllMusic described him as "an effortlessly agile artist able to communicate love, pathos, revolution, spirituality, and even sensuality on equal terms."

The song Mi Chalwa, recorded and mixed by Soundism's Vladi Vargas, was included on Greensleeves' compilation album The Biggest Reggae One Drop Anthems 2005, which Jamaica Observer gave accolades and called a "must-have collection".

In November 2015 he released his 19th studio album, Love & Wisdom.

On 29 April 2025 his son, Jabari 'Baba Skenng' Johnson, was killed in a TikTok live streaming in St. Andrew, Jamaica.

== Discography ==
- Keep Your Joy (2002), Ghetto Technology
- Working So Hard (2002), KJ
- Unlimited (2003), Reggae Vibes
- Never Give Up (2003), On the Corner
- Surprise Dem (2004), Vikingsd
- Most Royal (2004), Jah Warrior
- Rise (2005), On the Corner
- Princess Gone...The Saga Bed (2006), VP
- Wheat and Tears (2006), Greensleeves
- Life Is Just a Journey (2007), Maximum Sound/Corner Shop
- The Pow Pow Trilogy (2008), Pow Pow – with Anthony B and Turbulence
- No Matter the Time (2008), Vikings
- Ruff & Tuff Riddim (2008), Pow Pow
- Work Off Selection (2008), IrieVibrations
- Keep Ya Head Up (2010), Rastar
- Love & Wisdom (2015), New Creation Records
