= The Rastafarians =

California-based reggae group

The Rastafarians was a California-based reggae group founded by Jamaican natives Ras Binghi, Big Dread, Michael Ashley aka Haile Maskel (bass and lead vocals), Patrick Houchen aka Shaka (drums and lead vocals) and Californian Herb Daly (guitar) in Santa Cruz, California in 1980. Other members included Constantine "Vision" Walker who had previously worked with both Bob Marley and Rita Marley and noted MC Tony "Moses" Wright, who performed and toured with Spearhead. Some members of the band had also worked with Ras Michael and the Sons of Negus. The ensemble released the critically acclaimed album "Orthodox" in 1981.

== Track listing for Orthodox ==
1. "Seek H.I.M.#"
2. "Hold On Jah Jah Children#"
3. "This Yah Musik#"
4. "Orthodox#"
5. "Occupation#"
6. "A Love We Deal Wit#"
7. "Roll Call#"
8. "Jah's Greatest Blessing#"
9. "Words of Wisdom#"
10. "Rasta Theme"
