= Jimmy London (reggae singer) =

Jamaican reggae singer (born 1949)

- Born: Trevor Anthony Shaw; 30 November 1949 (age 76); Saint Catherine Parish, Jamaica
- Genres: Reggae
- Occupation: Singer-songwriter
- Instrument: Vocals
- Years active: Late 1960s – present
- Labels: Impact, Trojan, Burning Sounds

Jimmy London (born Trevor Anthony Shaw, 30 November 1949 in Saint Catherine Parish, Jamaica) is a Jamaican reggae singer who first recorded in the late 1960s, and achieved chart success both in Jamaica and the United Kingdom in the early and mid-1970s.

== Biography ==
=== The Inspirations ===
London was a member of vocal duo The Inspirations, along with Ransford White (later known as Billy Dyce). White's brother Doraney was a member of The Techniques, and the duo hung out at the Techniques rehearsal premises on King Street, becoming friendly with Roy Shirley, who helped them to get started in the music business. They recorded their debut single "I Need Money" for producer Sir JJ at Linden Pottinger's studio, but when it failed to make much impact, they moved on to work with Lee "Scratch" Perry, recording "Tighten Up" (twice, it was originally recorded at WIRL, but re-voiced at Studio One). They released a further song for Perry, "You Know What I Mean", but dissatisfied with the attention they received from Perry, moved on to Joe Gibbs. With Gibbs, they recorded tracks such as "Take Back Your Duck", "La La", and "The Train is Coming".

=== Solo ===
He was also a member of The Untouchables, and Rocking Horse (along with Keith Poppin). His biggest successes, however, would come in the early 1970s, when he teamed up with the Impact All Stars at the recently built Randy's studio to record tracks such as a cover of The Everly Brothers's "Till I Kissed You", Simon & Garfunkel's "Bridge Over Troubled Waters", and "A Little Love". The latter two tracks were big hits in Jamaica and the UK (London was the first artist to record at the studio). Both of these appeared on London's debut album, Bridge Over Troubled Waters in 1972. Further hits followed with the likes of "Rock and Roll Lullaby", "No Letter Today", "Together", "Jim Say Hello", and "Don't Keep The Kids". In 1975, London toured the UK supporting George McCrae, receiving excellent reviews for his appearance at London's Lyceum Ballroom, with further singles being released in the following years, including the hits "Having a Party" and "In My Heart", which charted on the UK reggae chart in 1978, with further albums released in the late 1970s and one in 1980. London continued to record through the 1980s and 1990s, including tracks for Phillip Fraser's Razor Sounds label, and continued to perform well into the 2000s.

His debut album, Bridge Over Troubled Waters was reissued in 2004 with bonus tracks as A Little Love, the track "A Little Love" also being chosen to promote London as part of Mayor Ken Livingstone’s "Totally London" campaign.

== Albums ==
- Bridge Over Troubled Waters (1972), Trojan
- Jimmy in London (1976), Jama
- Welcome to mMy World (1978), Burning Sounds
- Children Crying in the Ghetto (1979), Rootsman/(1980) GC
- It Ain't Easy Living in the Ghetto (1980), Burning Sounds
- Together With Jimmy London (1989), Blue Mountain
- Hold On (1996), Lagoon (compilation)
- The Jimmy London Collection – 18 Magnificent Hits, Beta (compilation)
- A Little Love (2004), Impact (expanded edition of Bridge Over Troubled Waters)
