= Prince Alla =

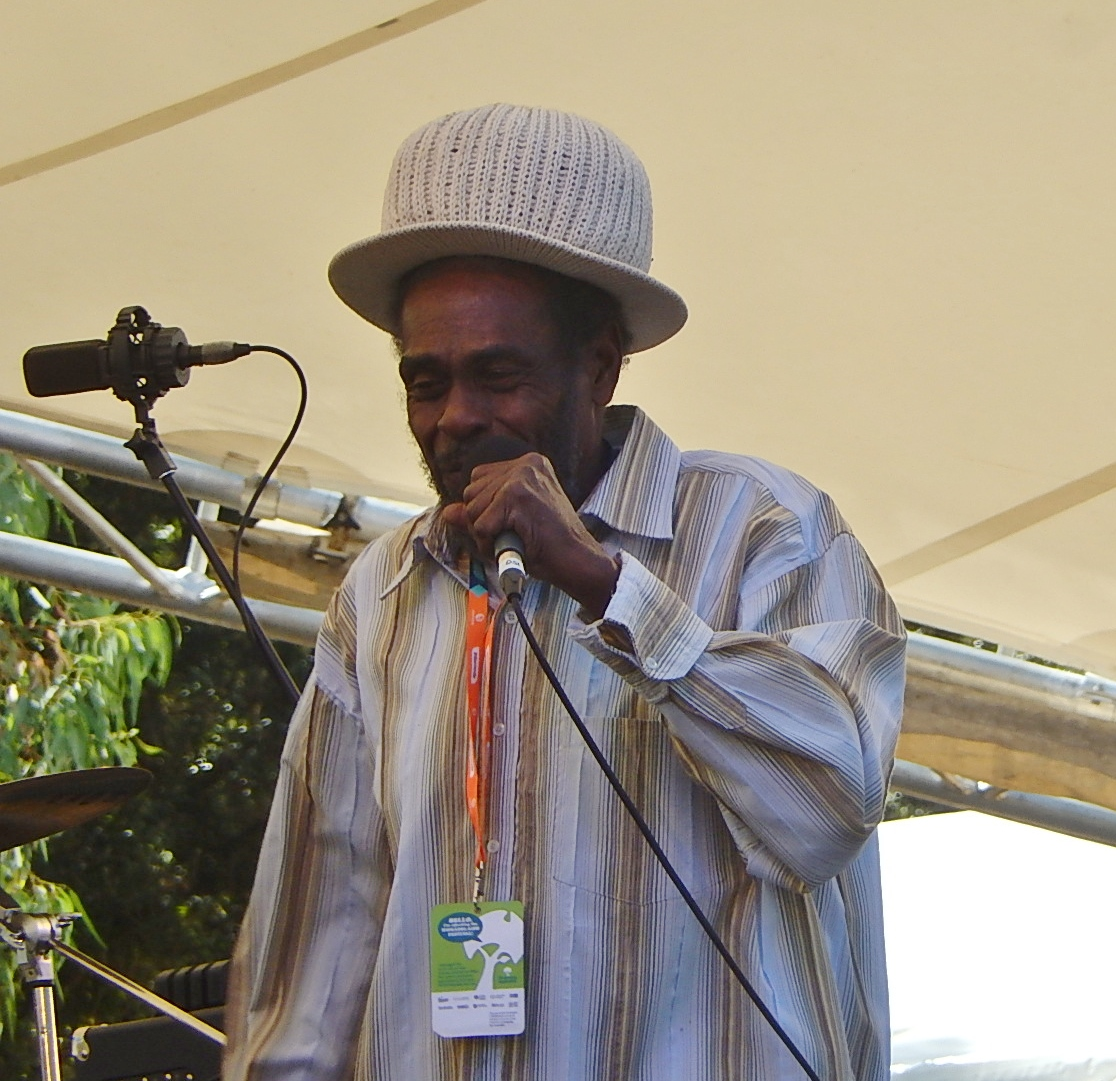
- Prince Alla performing in 2015

Background information
- Also known as: Ras Alla, Prince Allah
- Born: Keith Lorenzo Blake; 10 May 1950 (age 76)
- Origin: St. Elizabeth, Jamaica
- Genres: Roots reggae
- Instrument: Vocals
- Years active: Late 1960s – present

Keith Lorenzo Blake (born 10 May 1950), better known as Prince Alla (sometimes Prince Allah or Ras Allah) is a Jamaican roots reggae singer whose career began in the 1960s, and has continued with a string of releases into the 2000s.

== Biography ==
Born in St. Elizabeth, and raised in Greenwich Town, Kingston, Jamaica, Blake's career began in the vocal group The Leaders with Milton Henry and Roy Palmer, who recorded three tracks for producer Joe Gibbs in the late 1960s. When The Leaders broke up, Blake continued to work with Gibbs, who issued his debut solo release, "Woo Oh Oh". Blake had been interested in the Rastafari movement since he had a vision as a child, and in 1969, Blake's Rastafarian faith saw him get heavily involved in Jamaica's camp community, withdrawing from the music scene and living in Prince Emmanuel Edwards' camp at Bull Bay. He re-entered the music scene in the mid-1970s, releasing a single "Born a Fighter" for producer Teddy Powell, before working with Bertram Brown's Freedom Sounds, with a series of recordings, now under the name Prince Alla, that are now regarded as roots reggae classics, such as "Sun Is Shining", "Bucket Bottom", "Lot's Wife", and "Stone". He also recorded for producer Tapper Zukie, including the album Heaven Is My Roof. Continuing interest in his work saw the release of two albums of material from the 1970s on Blood & Fire records, Only Love Can Conquer and I Can Hear The Children Singing, which brought his work to a new audience. Alla continued to release records occasionally through the 1980s and 1990s, including an album with Jah Shaka. Alla has continued to be in demand with digital roots producers, and has released several albums with the likes of Jah Warrior. Since 2010 Prince Alla is touring the world with Rockers Agency and stays in popular demand for live performances across the globe.

== Albums ==
- Heaven Is My Roof (1978), New Star
- The Best of Prince Alla (1981), Redemption Sounds, reissued as Great Stone (1984), High Times
- King of the Road (1982), Ital International, reissued as Showcase (1984), Vista
- Jah Children Gather Round (1996), Jah Shaka
- Sweet Sensation Corner Stone
- Only Love Can Conquer (1997), Blood & Fire
- Lion a Go Bite Yu (1999), Headphone Music
- Glory (2000), Jah Warrior
- One Bright Day (2002), Back Yard
- More Love (2002), Jah Warrior
- I Can Hear The Children Singing (2002), Blood & Fire
- Archive Recordings Showcase Volume 1 (2009), Archive Recordings
- Showcase (2020), Burning Sounds Record
- Who is Man ? (2026), single 7 inch, Soundation Sound System Records
