= Jah Shaka =

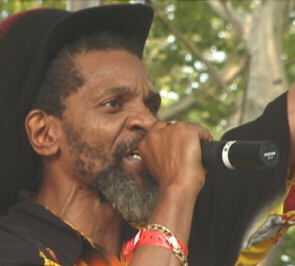
- Jah Shaka in 2002

Background information
- Also known as: Zulu Warrior
- Born: c. 1948; Clarendon Parish, Jamaica
- Died: 12 April 2023 (aged 75)
- Genres: Roots reggae, dub
- Occupation: DJ
- Years active: 1968–2023
- Label: Jah Shaka Music
- Website: Official website

Jah Shaka (born Neville Powell c. 1948 – 12 April 2023), also known as the Zulu Warrior, was a Jamaican reggae/dub sound system operator who operated a South East London-based, roots reggae Jamaican sound system from 1970. His name is an amalgamation of the Rastafarian term for God and that of the Zulu king Shaka Zulu.

== Career ==
Jah Shaka was born in Clarendon Parish, Jamaica, an area which has produced numerous roots reggae stars, amongst them Toots Hibbert, Everton Blender, Barrington Levy and Freddie McGregor.

He arrived in England in 1956 and attended Samuel Pepys school in Brockley, South London.

Jah Shaka started out at the age of 12 on the Freddie Cloudburst Sound System as an operator, before setting up his own sound system. By the late 1970s Shaka's system had rapidly gained a large and loyal following due to the combination of spiritual content, high energy rhythms, massive sonority and his dynamic personal style. That following notably included many of the pioneers of post-punk such as Public Image Ltd and The Slits.

In 1980 Shaka played himself in the film Babylon (directed by Franco Rosso, although he directed the scene he appeared in), operating his Sound System in a soundclash at the climax of the story. In 1986 footage of the Jah Shaka soundsystem appeared in the Black Audio Film Collective's Handsworth Songs.

In addition to Rastafari, Shaka cited Martin Luther King, Malcolm X, George Jackson and Angela Davis as influences.

Shaka stayed true to his spiritual and distinct musical style during the 1980s when many other Sound Systems had started to follow the Jamaican trend towards playing less orthodox styles tending towards slack dancehall music. In 1989, Shaka visited Jamaica and worked with many musicians there, including King Tubby.

On 23 September 2000, he suffered numerous injuries during a house fire. In 2002, Jah Shaka appeared before a large crowd in New York City's Central Park. Live footage of Shaka is featured in the documentary All Tomorrow's Parties based on the musical festival, which was released in 2009.

== Label ==

From 1980, Shaka released music on his own Jah Shaka Music label from Jamaican artists such as Max Romeo, Johnny Clarke, Bim Sherman and Prince Alla as well as UK groups such as Aswad and Dread & Fred. He released a number of dub albums, often under the Commandments of Dub banner.

Artists featured on releases in the 21st Century include both established singers like Tony Tuff, and new emerging artists like Rockaway and Principle - who have sung over riddims produced by his son Malachi, known as Young Warrior.

== Non-musical work ==
In the early 1980s, he ran a three-storey community hub in New Cross, known as the Culture Shop, which acted as a focal point for local black youth and housed a record store, a Caribbean food outlet and a Rastafari-oriented hair salon.

Shaka also established the Jah Shaka Foundation to carry out assistance with projects in Ghana, where the foundation bought 7 acres (28,000 m^{2}) of land in Agri, 30 miles outside of Accra. It has also distributed medical supplies, wheelchairs, library books, carpentry tools, drawing materials and records to clinics, schools and radio stations in the Accra area establishing important links with the local communities.

Shaka himself was actually a youth worker years ago, and was regularly quoted encouraging youths to study geography and history so they know "what's happened, where it's happening and who's doing it".

== Death ==
Jah Shaka died on 12 April 2023, at the age of 75. His official Nine Night was held on 21 April at the Great Hall, Goldsmiths University, followed by an official memorial event at the E1 venue on 22 October 2025.

== Legacy and influence ==
"All sound system followers have their favourites, and there is a certain section of the population who love only Shaka. It seemed that when the other sounds had done with their boasting and toasting, there would come a discreet hiss from the corner, and Shaka would mutter a title, or more often an invocation to Jah RasTafari, and the old-style heavy bakelite-style head of his arm would lower to the vinyl. Then it might seem that the walls were tumbling down around your ears. Then it might seem that your body had never felt those rhythms to impel and overwhelm, you’d find your feet flashing like sparklers."

— Vivien Goldman, "Shaka! Spiritual Dub Warrior", New Musical Express (1981)

Jah Shaka graffiti mural, Brighton, UK, 2025.

Memorial plaque for Jah Shaka installed in Dalston Square, 2025.

Jah Shaka events were renowned for attracting a wide audience from all backgrounds, races and ages. His dances attract numbers previously thought unthinkable for this genre of music. Shaka believes it to be a testament to the quality of the message that he expounds in his choice of music and his Rastafarian beliefs. His followers are known to be vocally ardent, and have developed dance steps that resemble African war dances.

Shaka's uncompromising "Warrior Style" inspired a host of UK reggae artists and Sound Systems such as The Disciples, Iration Steppas, Jah Warrior, Conscious Sounds, and Zion Train.

Non-reggae artists claiming Shaka as an influence include Mark Stewart and Kevin Martin. Basement Jaxx have cited Jah Shaka as being their best night out ever. Don Letts has also frequently referenced the influence of Jah Shaka on John Lydon and on the punk scene as a whole. Neneh Cherry stated that a Jah Shaka dance in Streatham would be the event in the past she would like to revisit and show her children.

Jah Shaka recordings have been sampled in Jungle music, including on tracks by the Ragga Twins and The Dream Team. Drum and bass was also influenced by Jah Shaka's sound system, and a number of the DJ's who feature in that genre, such as Fabio, Bryan Gee, Jumping Jack Frost and Congo Natty followed and were influenced by his sound. He is also cited as an influence on dubstep, especially artists such as Digital Mystikz and Mala.

Jah Shaka's son Young Warrior started his own sound system in 2011 and has played at dub and reggae events across the UK and Europe, including Notting Hill Carnival.

In 2017, Jah Shaka received a JaRIA (Jamaica Reggae Industry Association) Honour Award for "Extraordinary impact on the Reggae Industry (Sound System)" at Courleigh Auditorium, Kingston Jamaica. In that year he also received an International Reggae Day award as a "pioneer of dub".

In October 2023 Jah Shaka was awarded a post-humous special recognition award by the London Chamber of Commerce and Industry.

On 13 September 2025 an engraved stone honouring Jah Shaka was unveilled at Dalston Square in Hackney, in recognition of his groundbreaking soundsystem performances at venues such as The Four Aces Club and Cubies which were located in the area.
