= Snow (musician) =

Canadian musician (born 1969)

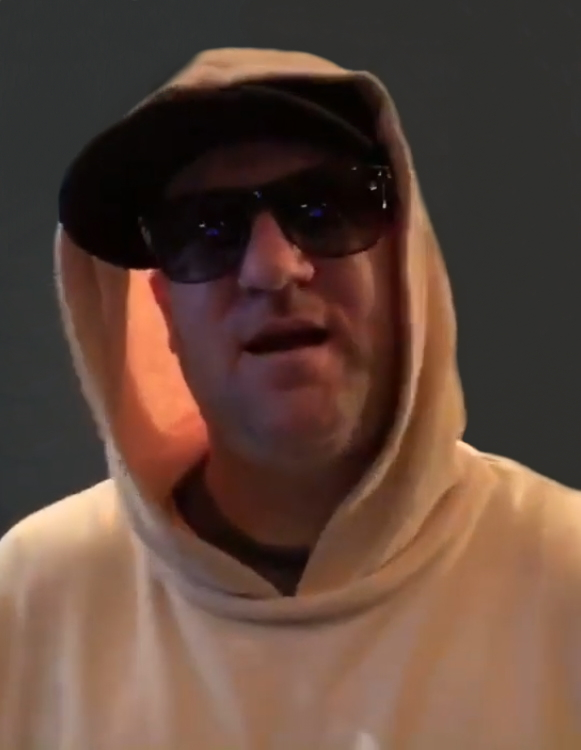
- Snow in 2019

Background information
- Born: Darrin Kenneth O'Brien; October 30, 1969 (age 57); North York, Ontario, Canada
- Genres: Hip-hop; dancehall; reggae; reggae fusion
- Occupations: Rapper; singer; songwriter; musician
- Instruments: Vocals; guitar
- Years active: 1989–present
- Labels: Virgin; EMI; True North; East West; Motorjam/Elektra
- Website: www.daddysnow.com

Darrin Kenneth O'Brien (born October 30, 1969), known professionally as Snow, is a Canadian rapper and musician. His 1992 single "Informer" spent seven weeks at No. 1 on the US Billboard Hot 100.

== Early life, family and education ==
Darrin Kenneth O'Brien was born on October 30, 1969, in North York, Ontario (now part of Toronto), one of three children born to an Irish-Canadian cabdriver and a homemaker. As a child, American musician Rick James served as Snow's babysitter. James was dating a friend's mother at the time. Snow is cousins with both NHL Hall of Famer Brad Park and musician Steven Page.

Following his parents' divorce, he was raised by his mother in the Allenbury Gardens public housing project where he became fascinated with the gangster lifestyle. He became involved in a cycle of fighting, drinking and stealing. He never learned to read properly and dropped out of school while in the 9th grade. Growing up he had a strong interest in rock music, but after an influx of Jamaican immigrants moved to the neighborhood in 1983, his interest turned to reggae music, and he became adept at the use of the Jamaican dialect. He developed his own style of music, by blending dancehall and reggae with rock and pop music.

In 1987, Snow served eight months of a one-year sentence after pleading guilty to beating a person with a crowbar during a bar brawl. In 1988, Snow was involved in an incident at a North York pub in which two people were stabbed "in the lane"; he was accused, and was subsequently charged with two counts of attempted murder. Snow served eight months in jail before a jury acquitted him on both counts. While he was in jail, he wrote music, which he performed for fellow inmates. "Informer" was one of the songs he wrote during his incarceration.

== Career ==
On a trip to New York, Marvin Prince was able to pitch Snow's music to rap star M.C. Shan. In 1991, Snow went to New York, where Shan introduced him to music producers David Eng and Steve Salem. Snow signed a contract to record on their Motorjam/Elektra record label, then they recorded his debut album 12 Inches of Snow. Due to Snow's impending return to prison, the album was recorded very quickly.

12 Inches of Snow was released in 1992, while Snow was in prison. Shan, Eng, Salem, and Prince promoted it and, by the time Snow was released from prison, the single "Informer" was a chart-topping hit. 12 Inches of Snow sold over 8 million copies worldwide, with the "Informer" single remaining number 1 on the American Billboard charts for seven consecutive weeks. "Informer" has been recorded twice in the Guinness Book of World Records as the best-selling reggae single in US history, as well as the highest charting reggae single in history. A second single, "Girl I've Been Hurt", reached Number 19 on the Hot 100. In Japan, Snow received the Recording Industry Association of Japan's 1994 Japan Gold Disc Award for New Artist of the Year.

=== Origin of stage name ===
After one of Snow's neighbouring Jamaican families introduced him to reggae, one of his neighbours called him "Snow White" and the name stuck. Later, Snow's friend Marvin Prince created the backronym "Super Notorious Outrageous Whiteboy", but Snow never claimed the title himself.

=== Legal disputes over production of 12 Inches of Snow ===
While touring as Snow's DJ in December 1994, Marvin Prince abruptly left the tour after discovering that Snow, according to court documents, "was receiving more money from management than he was." While listed as only the writer of the song "Runway" on the 12 Inches of Snow album, Prince claimed to have co-written five songs and co-produced the album with Shan, Eng, and Salem. Prince alleged that Eng and Salem provided "a draft of a multi-album production and recording agreement" to both Snow and himself. Unable to understand the contract, Snow allegedly "sent a copy to his mother to get legal advice from her friend" and Prince "never saw the agreement again." Moreover, Prince claimed to have entered an "oral agreement" with Snow implying that the two would share profits from the album "fifty-fifty". The first agreement, Prince alleged, occurred "in 1990, when the two men began working together on songs in Prince's basement and he "allegedly suggested to" Snow, "if something comes out of this, let's be partners." The second oral agreement, according to Prince, took place in August 1991 while Snow auditioned for Shan. Snow referred to Prince as his partner in a promotional video, but claimed to have used the term "only in the slang sense." Prince "admitted that these discussions were not concrete; the parties never organized a formal business plan, nor was plaintiff in New York to advance defendant's career."

Shan, Eng, and Salem testified that they were unaware of a partnership between Snow and Prince, and Shan denied that Prince co-produced 12 Inches of Snow and co-wrote the five songs in question. "Informer", for example, was officially written by Snow, Shan, and composer Edmond Leary. Years later, after Snow and Prince had their falling out, Prince unsuccessfully sued Snow for compensation. While Prince had initially been awarded a $1.5 million settlement by a jury, the court overturned the original ruling and dismissed Prince's suit on the grounds that he had "no viable claims" to a partnership with Snow.

In a 2019 interview, Prince recounted his history with Snow and claimed that he mentored, recorded demos for, scheduled showcase performances for, and ultimately, arranged for Snow to audition for MC Shan. Prince stated that he and Snow wrote "Informer" over the phone while Snow was serving his sentence at Maplehurst Correctional Complex. Prince claimed that he played Junior Reid's "Foreign Mind" over the phone, and Snow used the track's flute melody as the basis for "Informer". Parts of the first verse and third verse of "Informer", according to Prince, were reworked from Eek-A-Mouse's performance of "Tell Them" at Sunsplash 1981. Originally, Prince alleges, the final verse of "Informer" was written and performed by a second vocalist named "Little Red". Prince maintains that the judge who overturned the original ruling did so illegally, and he believes race played a role in the judge's decision.

Co-producer and co-writer Edmond Leary later claimed M.C. Shan unfairly received most of the production credits for 12 Inches of Snow. He told Vice, "So actually, if you want the truth of the matter, if we hadn't done it equally and had to split up the money I would have gotten 70% of writer's [royalties] off that album they probably would have split up 30, because I wrote most of that album. Most of the words were mine, and the ideas and structures and backgrounds in the vocal booth with me telling him what keys to sing the harmonies in and what have you. So I had a lot to do with that sound that became so popular and went Platinum." After struggling with a cocaine addiction and homelessness, in 2013 Leary was a street performer at Madison Square Park and Union Square.

=== International success ===
In 1994, Snow collaborated with Cyndi Lauper on Junior Vasquez's Homegrown and Sly and Robbie's Pop Goes the Dancehall remix of "Girls Just Want to Have Fun", retitled "Hey Now (Girls Just Want to Have Fun)".

Eng had a studio in Jamaica and, in 1994, Snow recorded his second album Murder Love in Jamaica, Canada, and New York. While not a commercial success in North America, the album featured Snow performing with reggae and dancehall musicians Ninjaman, Junior Reid, Half Pint, Buju Banton, Beenie Man, Dave Kelly, and Sly and Robbie. The "Anything for You" remix became a club favorite and, according to Billboard's Elena Oumano, made Snow a figure of respect on the Jamaican music scene. "Anything For You" became the top-selling single in Jamaica in 1995 and "Si Wi Dem Nuh Know We" also reached the number one slot in Jamaica. Murder Love proved to be a popular album in Asia, with the single "Sexy Girl" remaining on Japan's Top Singles chart for 16 weeks, ultimately reaching number one.

The success of Murder Love allowed Snow to tour Asia and collaborate with Thai rap artist Joey Boy. In 1996, Eng established an office in Bangkok, founded Dimsum Entertainment, and included Snow in this expansion. In 1996, Eng produced Joey Boy's album Fun, Fun, Fun. Snow performed on the chart-topping Thai single "Fun, Fun, Fun" and appeared in the music video. Joey Boy appeared on Snow's Thai single "Me and Joey". In 2008, Snow also featured Joey Boy on the track "Catch a Kick".

By the end of 1996, Murder Love's "Si We Dem Nuh Know We" received a Juno nomination for Best Reggae Recording. Overall, the album produced three music videos: "Anything For You", "Anything For You (All Star Cast Remix)", and "Sexy Girl". In the 1995 film Klash, Snow appears performing "Rivertown".

Snow followed up Murder Love with an album named after his daughter, Justuss. The first single "Boom Boom Boogie" took Asia by storm, achieving gold status with the music video appearing on MTV Japan five to six times a day. Released in the United States and Canada in 1997, the single "If This World Were Mine" failed to chart but the video regularly appeared on The Box. The album reached number 12 on the U.S. reggae charts and in 1998 was nominated for Best Reggae album at the Juno Awards in Vancouver, British Columbia. In late 1997, Snow released a "Greatest Hits" compilation, called The Greatest Hits of Snow.

In 1999, Snow reunited with M.C. Shan, producing the album Cooler Conditions in Japan. The only single, "The Plumb Song", spent eight weeks on the Japan Singles chart, peaking at number 27. It was recorded at Metalworks Studios in Mississauga, Ontario.

=== Return to the Canadian charts ===
In 2000, Snow signed to Virgin Music Canada. Later that year, he released the album Mind on the Moon. The single "Everybody Wants to Be Like You" landed Snow back on the Canadian Singles chart and earned him three Juno nominations.

In 2002, Snow worked with Shaggy and Blu Cantrell's producer to record Two Hands Clapping. "Legal", the first single, reached number 13 on the Canadian Singles Chart.

=== 2013–present ===
In 2013, after Yahoo CEO Marissa Mayer complained about the company's "hold" music during a fourth-quarter earnings call, Snow and the Jingle Punks recorded a much publicized jingle for Yahoo. The lyrics went, "You're on hold / Hold on at Yahoo / Gimme a second while I patch you through," goes the first verse. "The CEO didn't like the hold music / So Daddy Snow wrote this jam for you."

In summer 2014 while in Miami, Florida, Snow signed with Bugatti Music Entertainment and teamed up with Grammy-winning producers Cool & Dre, Kent Jones and Scott Storch and began recording again.

On October 2, 2014, Snow's new single "Shame" was released, featuring Mykal Rose (Black Uhuru). On October 11, 2014, Snow announced that all proceeds from "Shame" will be donated to the fight against cancer.

On June 19, 2017, Snow was awarded the Socan Classics 100,000 Radio Performances in Canada for commemorating more than 100k times his music has played on radio.

On January 23, 2019, Puerto Rican rapper Daddy Yankee released the reggaeton and dancehall song "Con Calma" featuring Snow, which has been described as a remake or reimagination of "Informer". The single peaked at number 22 on the Billboard Hot 100, becoming Snow's first entry on the chart since 1993, and reached number one on the US Hot Latin Songs list. Internationally, the track topped the charts of five Spanish-language countries and reached the top 10 in 10 others in Latin America. Across Europe, the song entered the charts of numerous countries, peaking at number 14 in Italy and number 23 in Switzerland. In the Netherlands, the song rose to number one in April 2019. "Con Calma" also became Snow's first entry on the Canadian Hot 100 chart after debuting at number 99 in February 2019. It eventually peaked at number 6.

On October 17, 2019, Snow and his wife Tara O'Brien attended the 5th Annual Latin American Music Awards in Hollywood, California at the Dolby Theatre. Snow was nominated for three awards. In February 2020, Snow won four awards Song of the Year with Daddy Yankee for "Con Calma" at Premio Lo Nuestro Awards.

In March 2020, Snow was given the Pop Music Award from SOCAN.

Snow and Daddy Yankee won the Top Latin Song of the Year at the 2020 Billboard Music Awards, and "Con Calma" won big at the Latin Billboard Music Awards on October 21, 2020, with Snow taking home six awards. Snow attended the awards with Tara O'Brien in Florida.

== Television and film appearances ==
Drew Carey, a long time Snow fan, had Snow record a reggae version of The Drew Carey Show theme song, "Moon Over Parma", for the series' eighth and ninth seasons.

In 1995, Snow appears as himself in concert performance in the movie Kla$h, Snow performs onstage and does a scene in which he is interviewed by Jamaican media in the film directed by Bill Parker and produced by Kingston Pictures.

In 2001, Snow played a prison guard in the film Prison Song. Snow appears as himself in the 2012 film The Movie Out Here produced by Canadian brewing company Kokanee and Alliance Films.

In 2015, Snow and his then-fiancée, Tara Elizabeth, appeared on a CBC webseries called True Dating Stories to tell the story of one of their first dates: a walk in a ravine turned police operation. Their episode was the most watched and the entire series won Best Web Series at the Hollywood Comedy Shorts Film Festival.

== Personal life ==
In November 2009, Snow's then common-law wife and the subject of many of his songs, Tamei Edberg, was diagnosed with cancer. She died three weeks later on November 27, 2009, at age 41. Their daughter was born in 1995.

On June 24, 2010, Snow held a fundraiser, ClosURE For Cancer, at Alley Catz Restaurant in Toronto during which they raised $15,000. Snow founded his own nongovernmental organization called Pure Snow NGO, which assists "tenants living in non-profit housing".

In May 2016, Snow married model and actress Tara Elizabeth Singh at St. Anselm Catholic Church in Toronto. CTV covered the ceremony, and local radio station KISS 92.5 interviewed the newlyweds on The Roz and Mocha Show on May 22, 2016.

== Discography ==
=== Studio albums ===
Album	Peak chart positions						Certifications
Album	CAN	AUS	JPN	US	US R&B/HH	US Reggae	Certifications
12 Inches of Snow: Released: January 19, 1993; Label: East West Records	3	27	—	5	12	4	RIAA: Platinum; MC: 3× Platinum
Murder Love: Released: February 21, 1995; Label: East West Records	—	—	14	—	—	1	
Justuss: Released: January 14, 1997; Label: East West Records	—	—	—	—	—	12	
Cooler Conditions: Released: September 13, 1999; Label: JVC	—	—	—	—	—	—	
Mind on the Moon: Released: August 15, 2000; Label: EMI	45	—	—	—	—	—	
Two Hands Clapping: Released: November 19, 2002; Label: Virgin Music	—	—	—	—	—	—	
Music: Released: January 21, 2025; Label: Millones Records	—	—	—	—	—	—	

=== Compilation albums ===
- The Greatest Hits of Snow (1997)

=== Remix albums ===
- Best Remix of Snow (1998)

=== Singles ===
Year	Title	Peak positions									Certifications	Album
Year	Title	CAN	AUS	IRE	NED	NZ	SWE	UK	US	US R&B/HH	Certifications	Album
1993	"Informer"	9	1	1	2	1	1	2	1	10	RIAA: Platinum; ARIA: 2× Platinum; BPI: Silver; BVMI: Platinum; IFPI: Gold; NVPI: Gold; RMNZ: Platinum	12 Inches of Snow
1993	"Girl I've Been Hurt"	28	26	20	28	17	37	48	19	78		12 Inches of Snow
1993	"Uhh in You"	—	—	—	—	—	—	67	—	—		12 Inches of Snow
1993	"Runway"	—	122	—	—	—	—	—	—	—		12 Inches of Snow
1993	"Pee-Nile Reunion" (MC Shan featuring Kool G Rap, Neek the Exotic, Diesel & Snow)	—	—	—	—	—	—	—	—	—		Non-album single
1994	"Si Wi Dem Nuh Know We" (featuring Ninjaman and Junior Reid)	—	—	—	—	—	—	—	—	—		Murder Love
1995	"Sexy Girl"	80	—	—	—	—	—	—	—	—		Murder Love
1995	"Anything for You" (All Star Cast Remix) (featuring Buju Banton, Louie Culture, Terror Fabulous, Beenie Man and Nadine Sutherland)	74	161	—	—	—	—	—	—	—		Justuss
1997	"Boom Boom Boogie"	—	—	—	—	—	—	—	—	—		Justuss
1999	"Someday Somehow"	—	—	—	—	—	—	—	—	—		Cooler Conditions
2000	"Everybody Wants to Be Like You"	2	—	—	—	—	—	—	—	—		Cooler Conditions and Mind on the Moon
2000	"Jimmy Hat"	—	—	—	—	—	—	—	—	—		Cooler Conditions and Mind on the Moon
2001	"The Plumb Song"	6	—	—	—	—	—	—	—	—		Cooler Conditions and Mind on the Moon
2001	"Joke Thing"	14	—	—	—	—	—	—	—	—		Mind on the Moon
2001	"Nothin' on Me"	—	—	—	—	—	—	—	—	—		Mind on the Moon
2001	"Still Too Much" (Ghetto Concept featuring Kardinal Offishall, Maestro, Snow, Red-1 and Ironside)	—	—	—	—	—	—	—	—	—		Ghetto Concept Presents...7 Bills All-Stars: Da Album
2002	"Legal"	13	—	—	—	—	—	—	—	—		Two Hands Clapping
2003	"That's My Life" (featuring Jelleestone)	—	—	—	—	—	—	—	—	—		Two Hands Clapping
2008	"Just 4 U" (featuring Kobra Khan)	—	—	—	—	—	—	—	—	—		Non-album singles
2009	"Adore You"	—	—	—	—	—	—	—	—	—		Non-album singles
2014	"Shame" (featuring Mykal Rose)	—	—	—	—	—	—	—	—	—		Non-album singles
2018	"Informer" (Audiofreaks Remix)	—	—	—	—	—	—	—	—	—		Non-album singles
2018	"Paye Nous" (featuring 2s, Ednocveli, YBG, and Lil C)	—	—	—	—	—	—	—	—	—		Non-album singles
2019	"Con Calma" (Daddy Yankee featuring Snow or Daddy Yankee and Katy Perry featuring Snow)	6	—	43	4	—	21	66	22	—	MC: 3× Platinum; BPI: Gold; FIMI: 2× Platinum; PROMUSICAE: 3× Platinum; SNEP: Diamond	El Disco Duro
2020	"Together" (featuring William Dinero, Francesco Antonio and Balam Kiel)	—	—	—	—	—	—	—	—	—		Non-album singles
2022	"City of Toronto Snow Song" (a Toronto PSA)	—	—	—	—	—	—	—	—	—		Non-album singles

== Awards and nominations ==
Latin Billboard Music Awards

Year	Nominee / work	Award	Result	Ref.
2020	"Con Calma"	Latin Rhythm Song of The Year	Won	
2020	"Con Calma"	Streaming Song of The Year	Won	
2020	"Con Calma"	Airplay Song of The Year	Won	
2020	"Con Calma"	Hot Latin Song of The Year	Won	
2020	"Con Calma"	Hot Latin Song Vocal Event of The Year	Won	
2020	"Con Calma"	Digital Song of The Year	Won	
2020	"Con Calma"	Crossover Artist of The Year	Nominated	
2020	"Con Calma"	Top Latin Song of The Year	Won	

Billboard Music Awards

Year	Nominee / work	Award	Result	Ref.
1993	Snow	Top Hot 100 Artist - Male	Nominated	
1993	"Informer"	Top Rap Song	Nominated	
1993	12 Inches of Snow	Top Reggae Album	Nominated	
2020	Con Calma - Daddy Yankee & Snow	Top Latin Song of The Year	Won	

Juno Awards

Year	Nominee / work	Award	Result
1994	"Informer"	Best Reggae Recording	Won
1994	Snow	Best Male Vocalist	Nominated
1994	12 Inches of Snow	Best Album	Nominated
1996	"Si Wi Dem Nuh Know We"	Best Reggae Recording	Nominated
1998	"Justuss"	Best Reggae Recording	Nominated
2001	Snow	Best Male Artist	Nominated
2001	Snow/Patterson	Best Song Writer	Nominated
2001	Mind on the Moon	Best Pop Album	Nominated
2002	"The Plumb Song"	Best Video	Nominated
2003	"Two Hands Clapping"	Best Reggae Recording	Nominated

Latin Grammy Awards

Year	Nominee / work	Award	Result
2019	"Con Calma" (Shared with Daddy Yankee)	Best Urban Fusion/Performance	Nominated

Lo Nuestro Awards

Year	Nominee / work	Award	Result
2020	"Con Calma" (Shared with Daddy Yankee)	Song of the Year	Won
2020	"Con Calma" (Shared with Daddy Yankee)	Single of the Year	Won
2020	"Con Calma" (Shared with Daddy Yankee)	Crossover Collaboration of the Year	Won
2020	"Con Calma" (Shared with Daddy Yankee)	Urban Song of the Year	Won
2020	"Con Calma" (Shared with Daddy Yankee)	Urban Collaboration of the Year	Nominated

=== MTV Video Music Awards ===
Year	Nominated work	Award	Result
2019	"Con Calma"	Best Latin	Nominated

Recording Industry Association of Japan

Year	Nominee / work	Award	Result
1994	Snow	Best New Recording Artist	Won

Society of Composers, Authors, and Music Publishers of Canada Video Award

Year	Nominee / work	Award	Result
2020	"Con Calma Remix"	Socan Pop Music Award	Won
2001	"Everybody Wants to Be Like You"	Much Music Top Video	Won

== Source ==
- "2020 Latin Billboard Awards Winners List". Billboard.
