= Justuss =

Studio album by Snow
- Released: January 14, 1997
- Recorded: 1996
- Studios: Grafton Studio (Kingston, Jamaica); Comfort/Bayside Sound (Toronto); Cherry Beach Sound (Toronto)
- Genres: Reggae fusion; hip-hop
- Length: 53:33
- Label: East West
- Producers: Dave Kelly; Microwave; Tony Kelly; Marcus Kane; Laurie Bogin

Snow chronology
Murder Love (1995)	Justuss (1997)	Cooler Conditions (1999)

Justuss is the third studio album by Canadian musician Snow, released on January 14, 1997, through East West Records. Like his second album Murder Love, Justuss is primarily a reggae album performed in Jamaican Patois and featured fellow reggae stars such as Yami Bolo, Nadine Sutherland, Buju Banton, Beenie Man, and Terror Fabulous. Because of his criminal record, Snow was unable to obtain a visa to promote Justuss in the United States and Japan.

== Production ==
For Justuss, Snow worked with producer Marcus Kane in Canada and with Tony Kelly and Laurie Bogin for three-and-a-half-months in Jamaica. Snow told Billboard magazine in 1996, "The second (Murder Love) was pressure. [Producers] Tony Kelly and Laurie brought out more of my creativity and different styles."

== Marketing ==
According to Elektra Marketing Director Michelle Murray, Murder Love "did well worldwide. So, we have to reconnect Snow with his fans from the Informer days and reestablish his credibility. We think this album is different because Snow has created a musical journey from his life-long experience. This album has really strong songs and a good thematic balance. Justuss has powerful underlying meanings." The marketing strategy for Justuss consisted of releasing limited edition LPs to underground markets and worldwide stations. For the United States and Canada, Elektra planned to market "If This World Were Mine" to various clubs, DJs, and "college and mix shows." Elektra also planned to "iron out" Snow's visa issues but apparently, were unable to do as he did not tour the United States or Japan to promote the album.

== Singles ==
"Boom Boom Boogie" achieved Gold status in Japan and "If This World Were Mine" was released as a twelve-inch single in the United States and Canada. However, the music videos for "If This World Were Mine" regularly appeared on The Box and "Boom Boom Boogie" played "five to six spins a day" on MTV Japan.

== Critical reception ==
Professional ratings
Review scores
Source	Rating
AllMusic	2.5/5 stars
Entertainment Weekly	B

Despite the fact that Justuss is Snow's lowest selling album, it received mostly positive reviews. Elena Oumano of Billboard declared, "His nimble tongued rude bwoy DJ persona remains as persuasive as ever in appealing dance tracks like opener "Steadly Woa" and "Mash Up Da Nation." But for his third album, Snow tips the album toward the sweetly intense he unveiled in only a track or two on his debut set. DJ stardom only spans only a brief season or two and Snow's plush, Afro-Erotic crooning—a sure route to career longevity—surpasses even his mic rocking."

Writing for Vibe magazine, She added, "Justuss covers a wider musical range—fragments of reggae and funk treasures, contemporary hip-hop and soul—opening up dancehalls borders without sacrificing the fundamental hardcore vibe. Snow unfurls nimble-tongued stutters and a heretofore unrevealed gift for intimacy—a mike cuddling singing style with subtlety and chops to match any of today's soul brothers."

Dmitri Ehlrich of Entertainment Weekly gave Justuss a "B" grade and wrote, "Perhaps the most surprising thing about this album of pop- and rap-tinged dancehall is how credible it is. While one is tempted to dismiss the Toronto MC as the Vanilla Ice of dancehall, Snow, in fact, has considerable skills: an easygoing flow, a mastery of Jamaican patois, and enough ideas to keep his songs interesting."

Even longtime Snow critic Rick Anderson, who gave Murder Love a negative review, observed, "Snow's third album finds him slowly emerging from the sophomore slump of his underwhelming Murder Love, but still not delivering any hit singles to rival the success of "Informer," from his debut. By now it's clear that he is more than just a novelty act, but he is still struggling to define a sound for himself that is something more than a hybrid of his influences."

In reviewing the track "Boom Boom Boogie," Larry Flick opined, "for the past few years, Snow has been working hard to strengthen his skills and credibility as a reggae toaster. He reveals a high degree of progress on this single which boldly blends pure Jamaican rhythms with dance/funk keyboards. His vocal style is now a hybrid of soul crooning and raunchy chatting, ripping through the baseline with palpable confidence."

== Track listing ==
No.	Title	Writer(s)	Producer	Length
1.	"Steedly Woa"	Darrin O'Brien; Anthony Kelly	Tony "CD" Kelly	4:16
2.	"Freedom"	O'Brien; Yami Bolo; Kelly	CD Kelly	4:35
3.	"Mash Up da Nation"	O'Brien; Kelly; George David Weiss; Hugo Peretti; Luigi Creatore	CD Kelly	4:46
4.	"If This World Were Mine"	O'Brien; Laurie Bogin; C. Bogin	L. Bogin; Marcus Kane	3:54
5.	"Check Out the Way It's Going Down"	O'Brien	Kane; L. Bogin	4:47
6.	"Day and Nite (Freakin' da Body)"	O'Brien; C. Bogin; L. Bogin	Kane; L. Bogin	4:12
7.	"Anything for You [All Star Cast Remix]" (featuring Buju Banton, Louie Culture, Terror Fabulous, Beenie Man and Nadine Sutherland)	O'Brien; Hurby "Luv Bug" Azor	Kelly	4:31
8.	"Boom Boom Boogie"	O'Brien; Kelly	CD Kelly	4:47
9.	"Hey Mr. D.J."	O'Brien; Kelly	Dave Kelly	4:01
10.	"Sugacaine"	O'Brien; Kelly	CD Kelly	4:46
11.	"It's Alright"	O'Brien; Anthony Johnson; Greg Wesley	L. Bogin; Kane	4:21
12.	"Mercy, Mercy, Mercy"	O'Brien; L. Bogin; C. Bogin	L. Bogin; Kane	4:37

Notes

- "I Want You" appears as a Bonus track on international copies of Justuss.
- "Me and Joey," a collaboration with Thai rapper Joey Boy, appears as a single on Justuss albums sold in Thailand.

Sample credits

- "Mash Up da Nation" samples "The Lion Sleeps Tonight" by Solomon Linda.

== Personnel ==
Adapted from the Justuss liner notes.

- Steve Salem – executive producer
- David Eng – executive producer
- Tony "CD" Kelly – engineering
- Rohan Dwyer – engineering, mixing
- Damian East – assistant engineer
- Frank Heller – mixing (Metal Works)
- Andy Van Dette – mastering (Masterdisk)

== Trivia ==
- Justuss was nominated for a Juno Award for Best Reggae Recording in 1998
- Justuss is the name of Snow's daughter.
