= Anything for You (Snow song) =

Single by Snow

from the album Murder Love
- Released: 1995
- Recorded: 1995
- Genre: Reggae; Hip-hop
- Length: 4:21
- Label: EastWest Records America, Atlantic
- Songwriters: Darrin O'Brien; Hurby "Luv Bug" Azor
- Producer: Hurby "Luv Bug" Azor

Snow singles chronology
"Si Wi Dem Nuh Know We" (1994)	"Anything for You" (1995)	"Sexy Girl" (1995)

Music video
- "Anything for You" on YouTube

"Anything for You" is a song by Canadian reggae recording artist Snow, released in 1995 by EastWest and Atlantic Records as the first single from his second album, Murder Love (1995). While becoming a club favorite and a grassroots hit on The Box in the United States and Canada, the single only peaked at number 74 on the Canadian Singles Chart. The All-Star Remix, however, reached number one in Jamaica and became the country's top-selling single of 1995. Its accompanying music video was directed by Hype Williams and filmed in Jamaica.

== Production ==
Sampling "Everybody Plays the Fool", "Anything for You" featured a young Nadine Sutherland, who previously won Jamaica's "Tastee Talent Contest."

The All-Star remix, recorded at Penthouse records in Jamaica, also featured Beenie Man, Buju Banton, Kulture Knox, Louie Culture and Terror Fabulous. In an interview with Jamaican Gleaner News, Sutherland remembered, "the energy was off the hook. Remember, everyone was creating on the spot. It's a true indication of the talents of these young men at the time. Everyone was busy writing; I don't remember any competition." Despite debates over "whose part was the best," Sutherland claimed Buju Banton's was her favorite and noted "that's the part I deejay when I perform it on stage. All the parts are special though. I love them all."

== Critical reception ==
Dave Sholin from the Gavin Report wrote, "Two years after bustin' out of Toronto with the smash 'Informer', Snow comes out of hiding joined by a sensational vocalist named Nadine Sutherland. Here's a lesson on how sampling delivers genuine impact as the track makes great use of the Main Ingredient's 1972 smash 'Everybody Plays the Fool'." Music & Media commented, "Sometimes it snows in April. The verbal torrent of 'Informer' has turned into a trickle, and the ragga has become plain roots reggae. We're dreaming of a white Easter."

== Music videos ==
Directed by American music video and film director, film producer, and screenwriter Hype Williams, the original video for "Anything for You" featured Snow and Nadine Sutherland performing in Jamaica. The All-star remix featured Snow performing with the other members of the cast at Penthouse Studios. Although not promoted by MTV and Muchmusic, the video regularly topped The Box's most requested videos.

== Legacy ==
Jamaica Gleaner News described "Anything for You" as the most important dancehall song of the 1990s, which created "a generation that overlapped with, and then replaced, the stars of the late 1980s, among those relative 'oldsters' Shabba Ranks, Supercat, Cutty Ranks and Admiral Bailey." Furthermore, journalist Mel Cooke asserted,"There is only one recording on which a large proportion of the dancehall generation which not only changed the beat but was also at the forefront of the visual era of Jamaican music. Performers were not only being heard on radio and sound systems but also seen in formal music videoson television (CVM by then joining the free-to-air fray) and the numerous recordings of dances and live recordings that were increasingly popular. That song is 'Anything For You,' with Canadian deejay Snow, Nadine Sutherland (the two having a version by themselves), Beenie Man, Buju Banton, Terror Fabulous, Louie Culture and Kulcha Knox performing on the remix. And while the audio recording was, and still is, very popular, it was the video which put 'Anything For You' over the top."

== Track listings ==
- CD maxi
1. "Anything for You" (loyal )
2. "Anything for You" (T.K Remix) – 4:14
3. "Anything for You" (Dancehall Remix) – 3:54
4. "Anything for You" (Hip Hop Remix) – 3:31
- 7" single
1. "Anything for You" (All-Star Remix) – 4:29
2. "Anything for You" – 3:45

== Charts ==
Chart (1995)	Peak position
Australia (ARIA)	161
Canada Top Singles (RPM)	74
Jamaica	1

== Personnel ==
- Text : Darrin O'Brien, Herby "Luv Bug" Azor
- Producer : Herby "Luv Bug" Azor
- Executive producer : David Eng, EZ Steve Salem
- Photography : David La Chapelle
