= Murder Love =

Studio album by Snow
- Released: February 21, 1995
- Studios: The Mixing Lab (Kingston, Jamaica); Bayside Sound (Queens, New York); Cherry Beach Sound (Toronto); Soundtrek Studios (New York City)
- Genres: Pop; reggae fusion
- Length: 53:46
- Label: East West
- Producers: MC Shan; Junior Reid; Hurby "Luv Bug" Azor; Michael Warner; John Ficarrotta

Snow chronology
12 Inches of Snow (1993)	Murder Love (1995)	Justuss (1997)

Singles from Murder Love
- 1. "Si Wi Dem Nuh Know We" Released: December 6, 1994; 2. "Anything for You" Released: 1995; 3. "Sexy Girl" Released: July 5, 1995

Murder Love is the second studio album by Canadian musician Snow, released on February 21, 1995, through East West Records. While his preceding album (12 Inches of Snow) featured an array of genres fusing hip-hop, pop, and reggae, Murder Love was recorded in Jamaica and primarily featured dancehall tracks. A number of songs featured dancehall legends Ninjaman, Half Pint, White Mice, and Nadine Sutherland, and Junior Reid produced and appeared on the track "Si Wi Dem Nuh Know We". While not producing a hit in the United States, the track "Sexy Girl" reached number one in Japan (becoming the 6th biggest hit of 1995) and the "Anything for You" remix became the top-selling single of 1995 in Jamaica. Ultimately, Murder Love reached number one the U.S. Reggae charts and "Si We Dem Nuh Know We" was nominated for a Juno for best reggae recording. Due to his criminal record, Snow was unable to enter the United States and promote the album.

== Production ==
In 1993, Snow began touring Jamaica, performing at such venues as the University of the West Indies, Topline, and the Jaguar Lounge in Halfway Tree. While performing at Sun Splash ’93, he befriended Ninjaman and the two began collaborating. As Snow put it, "we just clicked, so now we always hang out. Everyday when I'm in Jamaica I hang with him. When he's doing a track, he'll always invite me to come on it with him." In addition to working with Ninjaman, Snow began recording with one of the artists that influenced his interest in reggae, Junior Reid, who went on to produce the track that also featured Snow and Ninjaman, "Si We Dem Nuh Know We." Junior Reid also performed as guest vocalist on "Yesterday." Ninjaman also appeared as a guest vocalist on "Bad Men." Nadine Sutherland performed on the first single, "Anything For You", and Half-Pint performs on "Rivertown" and joins White Mice on "Time." The album featured several producers, including Junior Reid ("Si We Dem Nuh Know We"), Onree Gill ("Bad Men," "Rivertown," "Babylon," "Time," "Dream," "If You Like the Sound," and "Let’s Get it on"), MC Shan ("Yesterday" and "Sexy Girl") and Herby Azor ("Anything for You" and "Things to Say").

Ultimately, Snow spent eight months in Jamaica recording the album, and his recording crew, including M.C. Shan, Hurby Azor, and Michael Warner, flew to Jamaica to contribute to the album. Snow professed: "The experience of being in Jamaica definitely shaped the album. When I'm working, I don't listen to other music, for fear of stealing something unconsciously. But down there, you can't get away from music, it's all around you." He also observed, "The forward thing in dancehall reggae now is being positive, not singing all the time about gun talk and women. More than the beats, that had an influence in how the songs came out. Because I was going in that direction, it came together naturally." The name Murder Love materialized after Snow visited Ireland during his European tour in 1994. As he explained in 1995, "It's about the IRA (Irish Republican Army). They're killing people they should be loving. I'm saying to Catholics and Protestants, they should be loving because they're one people. I always write words that are hard to understand. You've got to listen. It could mean something different to you, and if it means something different to you that's good. But that's what it means to me." Thus, The Mail and Globe described the track as the "sinisterly named title track, which has a deceptively lovely chorus."

== Reception ==
Professional ratings
Review scores
Source	Rating
AllMusic	2/5 stars
Entertainment Weekly	B−

Upon release, Murder Love met with mixed reviews. Patricia Meschino of Reggae Report praised "Dream" as one of the albums "most satisfying cuts." She observed, "Here Snow reminisces about his days in Toronto's Allenbury housing project, where he first became acquainted with Reggae through the friendships formed with the many Jamaicans who had moved into his area" and "goes on to describe imagined evenings spent at Kingston's Godfather's nightclub and sessions with the Stone Love sound system." Heidi Seigmund of the Los Angeles Times wrote, "comparisons to rapper Vanilla Ice were inevitable in '93" but, "aside from being white artists working in black-music genres, the similarities end there." She went on to observe that "unlike Ice, Snow really is a skilled performer and an exceptional dancehall talent. That's evident on songs like "Anything for You," a buoyant duet with Nadine Sutherland, "Things to Say"—a Bob Marley tribute sampling Bill Withers' "Use Me"—and "Rivertown," a look at a Jamaican ghetto through the eyes of its young residents."

Chuck Eddy of Spin found Murder Love somewhat indecipherable and a departure from 12 Inches of Snow, writing "slow make out mush replaces the debut’s Algerian-rai/dancehall mix with some lighthearted Marvin Gaye liquid funk," and "like most reggae toasters, Snow seems to have learned to rap by studying Dick Van Dyke’s ‘hum-diddle-diddle-did-die-hum-diddl-eye’ chimney sweep scat in Mary Poppins. So I can’t guarantee I got the plots of these poems completely right."

== Track listing ==
No.	Title	Writer(s)	Producer(s)	Length
1.	"Si Wi Dem Nuh Know We" (featuring Junior Reid and Ninjaman)	Darrin O'Brien; Desmond Ballentine; Junior Reid	Junior Reid	3:30
2.	"Bad Men" (featuring Ninjaman)	O'Brien; Ballentine; Michael Warner; Onreé Gill	Gill; Warner	4:25
3.	"Rivertown" (featuring Half Pint)	O'Brien; Ray Basora; Sean Wallace; Warner; Gill	Gill; Warner	4:18
4.	"Murder Love"	O'Brien; Basora; Shawn Moltke; John Ficarrotta	MC Shan; Ficarrotta	4:46
5.	"Babylon"	O'Brien; Basora	Gill; Warner	4:08
6.	"Anything for You" (featuring Nadine Sutherland)	O'Brien; Hurby "Luv Bug" Azor	Azor	3:45
7.	"Yesterday" (featuring Junior Reid)	O'Brien; Moltke; Ficarrotta; Reid; Basora	MC Shan; Ficarrotta	4:14
8.	"Time" (featuring White Mice and Half Pint)	O'Brien; Wallace; Allan Crichton	Gill; Warner	3:59
9.	"Dream"	O'Brien; Warner; Gill	Gill; Warner	4:34
10.	"If You Like the Sound"	O'Brien; Warner; Gill	Gill; Warner	3:57
11.	"Sexy Girl"	O'Brien; Moltke; Ficarrotta; Basora	MC Shan; Ficarrota	4:38
12.	"Let's Get It On"	O'Brien; Basora; Warner; Gill	Gill; Warner	4:10
13.	"Things to Say"	O'Brien; Azor; Bill Withers	Azor	3:13

Sample credits

- "Bad Men" samples "Jungle Boogie" performed by Kool & the Gang, and written by Ronald Bell, Claydes Smith, Robert Mickens, Donald Boyce, Richard Westfield, Dennis Thomas, Robert Bell and George Brown.
- "Anything for You" samples "Everybody Plays the Fool" performed by The Main Ingredient, and written by Rudolph Clark, Ralph Bailey and Kenneth Williams.
- "Things to Say", samples "Use Me" written and performed by Bill Withers.

== Personnel ==
Adapted credits from the liner notes of Murder Love.

- Aria, Ray Basora, Maryann Enea, Joanne Giacinto, Linda Giacinto, Darrin O'Brien, Junior Reid, Too Tall, Licia Trotta, Kimiko Whittaker (add.): backing vocals
- Marty Batista: keyboards (track 7)
- John Ficarrotta: drum programming (track 11), rhythm guitar (tracks 7, 11)
- Etienne Lytle: keyboards, piano
- Shawn Moltke: drum programming (tracks 4, 7, 11)
- Eric Abrahams, Junior Edwards, John Ficarrotta, Michael Tuosto: engineering
- Hurby Azor, Andre Debourg, Onreé Gill, Frank Heller, Eric Lynch, Al "Taz" Machera, Tony Maserati, Michael Warner: mixing
- John Wydrycs: mixing engineer (tracks 4, 7, 11)
- Herb Powers: mastering (The Hit Factory)
- Dave La Chapelle: photography
- Jean Cronin: art direction and design

== Certifications and sales ==
Region	Certification	Certified units/sales
Japan (RIAJ)	Platinum	200,000^{^}
^{^} Shipments figures based on certification alone.
