= Si Wi Dem Nuh Know We =

"Si We Dem Nuh Know We"

Single by Snow

from the album Murder Love
- Released: December 6, 1994
- Recorded: 1994
- Genre: Reggae
- Length: 3:30
- Label: EastWest, Atlantic
- Songwriter(s): Desmond Balentine; Darrin O'Brien; Junior Reid
- Producer(s): Junior Reid

Snow singles chronology
"Girl I've Been Hurt" (1993)	"Si We Dem Nuh Know We" (1994)	"Anything for You" (1995)

"Si Wi Dem Nuh Know We", also known as "Si We... (Charged for Murder)", is a song by Snow featuring Ninjaman and Junior Reid. Recorded in Jamaica and produced by Junior Reid's One Blood production company, "Si Wi Dem Nuh Know We" was released in 1994 as a 12-inch maxi-single only. It also served as the first track on Snow's second album, Murder Love. Ultimately, "Si Wi Dem Nuh Know We" earned Snow a Juno nomination for Best Reggae Recording in 1996 and reached number one on the Jamaican reggae charts.

== Production ==
After the success of "Informer", Snow began touring Jamaica and developed a friendship with dancehall legend, Ninjaman. The two began recording tracks in Jamaica and their joint efforts led to the opportunity to record a track with Junior Reid, one of Snow's musical idols.

== Lyrical analysis ==
"Si We Dem Nuh Know We" is performed entirely in Jamaican Patois and features a heavy base line. Like "Informer", all three artists describe a "son" falsely charged with murder. Unlike "Informer", "Si We Dem Nuh Know We" is not a biographical song. Rather, the inspiration for the song came from murder charges levied against Snow's Uncle Patty. As Snow explained, "It's about an innocent man being charged; anybody who gets falsely accused of a crime."

== Reception ==
Larry Flick gave the tune a positive review, writing "The 'Informer' returns in good company and familiar territory. The three masters of the mike take a jab at keeping pace with bouncy synthesizer stabs and deep bass beats. Despite the crowded bill, the sound remains bare-boned, wicked, and guilty-as-charged of a good beating."
