= Boom Boom Boogie =

Single by Snow

from the album Justuss
- Released: 1997
- Recorded: 1996
- Genre: Reggae, hip-hop
- Length: 4:48
- Label: Atlantic and WEA
- Songwriter(s): Darrin O'Brien; Tony "CD" Kelly
- Producer(s): Tony Kelly

Snow singles chronology
"Sexy Girl" (1995)	"Boom Boom Boogie" (1997)	"The Plumb Song" (1999)

"Boom Boom Boogie" is a 1997 single (1996 in Japan) from Canadian reggae recording artist Snow's third album, Justuss. The track proved to be Snow's most successful single from Justuss, reaching number 29 on Tokio Hot 100 and reaching gold certification in Japan. The music video appeared on MTV Japan "five to six spins a day."

== Production ==
"Boom Boom Boogie" was written and recorded in Jamaica by Snow and Tony "CD" Kelly and remixed by Marcus Kane and Laurie Bogin for Au One Productions in Toronto, Ontario.

== Music video ==
The video for "Boom Boom Boogie" begins with Snow visiting a fortune teller who recounts Snow's "former life" as a prohibition era gangster. Snow is featured performing at various clubs gambling, playing pool, and performing on stage. At the end of the video, Snow leaves the fortune teller's shop and jumps into a convertible with his friends.

== Reception ==
Larry Flick of Billboard wrote,"for the past few years, Snow has been working hard to strengthen his skills and credibility as a reggae toaster. He reveals a high degree of progress on this single which boldly blends pure Jamaican rhythms with dance/funk keyboards. His vocal style is now a hybrid of soul crooning and raunchy chatting, ripping through the baseline with palpable confidence."

=== Certifications ===
Country	Certification	Date	Sales certified
Japan	Gold	December 1996	100,000

== Track listings ==
CD maxi

1. "Boom Boom Boogie" (LP Version) — Not listed
2. "Boom Boom Boogie" (R&B Remix) — Not listed
3. "Boom Boom Boogie" (Hip Hop Cocktail Remix) — Not Listed

== Personnel ==
- Text : Darrin O'Brien, Tony "CD" Kelly
- Producer : Tony "CD" Kelly
- Executive producer : David Eng, EZ Steve Salem
- Photography : David La Chapelle
