= Cecil Campbell =

Cecil Campbell may refer to:

- Prince Buster (Cecil Bustamente Campbell, 1938–2016), Jamaican ska/rocksteady singer
- Ini Kamoze (Cecil Campbell, born 1957), Jamaican reggae singer
- Terror Fabulous (Cecil Campbell, born 1974), Jamaican dancehall deejay
- Cecil Campbell (tennis) (1891–1952), amateur Irish tennis player
