= Mind on the Moon =

Studio album by Snow
- Released: October 10, 2000
- Recorded: 1999–2000
- Studios: Metalworks Studios (Mississauga, Ontario); Long View Farm (North Brookfield, Massachusetts); Deep Sound Studio (Scarborough, Ontario)
- Genres: Reggae; pop; hip-hop
- Length: 44:03
- Label: EMI
- Producers: Darrin O'Brien; Greig Nori; Chin Injeti; Robbie Patterson; Justin Gray; Michael Tucker; Dave Greenberg; Mark Jackson; Graham Brewer

Snow chronology
Cooler Conditions (1999)	Mind on the Moon (2000)	Two Hands Clapping (2002)

Professional ratings
Review scores
Source	Rating
JAM! Music	mixed

Mind on the Moon is an album by Canadian reggae musician Snow, released in 2000. Despite being his fifth album, this was his first since his 1993 debut 12 Inches of Snow that Snow returned to the pop charts and received mainstream airplay on both radio and television.

The album's lead single, "Everybody Wants to Be Like You" received the most radio airplay, reaching number 2 on Canada's Top Singles chart. The album's second single, "The Plumb Song", also received significant radio airplay and its music video received heavy rotation on MuchMusic. Three singles from the album ("Everybody Wants to Be Like You", "The Plumb Song" and "Joke Thing") were among the top 100 most played radio tracks in Canada in 2001.

The album was nominated for Best Pop Album at the Juno Awards of 2001, but lost.

== Track listing ==
No.	Title	Writer(s)	Producer(s)	Length
1.	"Joke Thing"	Darrin O'Brien; Robbie Patterson; Mark Jackson	O'Brien; Patterson; Justin Gray	3:25
2.	"Everybody Wants to Be Like You"	O'Brien; Patterson; Glenn Marais; Shawn Moltke	Michael Tucker	3:20
3.	"The Plumb Song"	O'Brien; Glenn Rosenstein; Moltke	Gray	3:46
4.	"Nothin' On Me"	O'Brien; Patterson; Tucker; Dave Greenberg	Tucker; Greenberg	3:38
5.	"Scrub Off"	O'Brien; Gray; Patterson	Gray	3:25
6.	"Everything's Fine"	Greig Nori; Deryck Whibley; O'Brien; Gerry Goffin; Michael Masser	Nori	3:57
7.	"Little Did They Know"	Simon Head; O'Brien; Moltke	Tucker; Greenberg	3:14
8.	"Anti-Love Song"	O'Brien; Gray; Patterson	Gray	4:06
9.	"Jimmy Hat"	O'Brien; Moltke; Rosenstein	Gray	3:47
10.	"Funky Martini"	O'Brien; Patterson; Jackson	O'Brien; Patterson; Jackson; Greenberg; Graham Brewer	4:03
11.	"Crazy Feeling"	O'Brien; Chin Injeti; Patterson	Injeti	3:37
12.	"Someday Somehow"	O'Brien; Rosenstein; Moltke	Tucker; Greenberg	3:45

Notes

- "Scrub Off" features guest vocals from Shantall
- "Little Did They Know" features guest vocals from Greig Nori.
- "Funky Martini" features guest vocals from Mark Jackson.

== Personnel ==
Adapted from the liner notes of Mind on the Moon.

Vocals

- Justin Gray – background vocals (track 8)
- Mark Jackson – background vocals (track 1)
- Shantall – background vocals (tracks 3, 5)
- Miranda Walsh – background vocals (tracks 1, 4, 8, 12)
- Karen Zilahi – background vocals (tracks 1, 5, 10)

Musicians

- Justin Abedin – guitar (tracks 1–3, 5, 7–9, 12)
- Tony Baltaglia – guitar (track 4)
- Adrian Eccleston – guitar (track 11)
- Glenn Marais – guitar (tracks 2, 6, 7), harmonica (track 8)
- Greig Nori – guitar (track 7), programming (track 6)
- Robbie Patterson – guitar (track 4, 10), bass (tracks 1, 4, 5–8, 10, 12)
- Chin Injeti – bass, keyboards (track 2)
- Adrian Passarelli – drums (track 11)
- Winston "Pappy" Frederick – steel drums (track 10)
- Adam Alexander – keyboards (track 10), synths (track 1)
- Justin Gray – acoustic guitar (track 8), keyboards (track 11), programming (track 6)
- Dave Greenberg – keyboards, drum programming (tracks 4, 7, 12)
- Michael Tucker – keyboards, drum programming (tracks 2, 4, 7, 12)
- Darrin O'Brien – drum programming (track 10)
- DJ Tab – scratches (tracks 1, 3, 5, 6, 8, 11)
- DJ S-Luv – scratches (track 4)
- Roger Salvesen – programming (track 11)
- Deryck Whibley – programming (track 6)

Production

- MC Shan – vocal production and engineering (tracks 2, 9)
- Michael Tucker – mixing
- Bob Ludwig – mastering at Gateway Mastering (Portland, Maine)
- Ed Krautner – assistant engineer
- Rob Gil – assistant engineer
- Joel Kazmi – assistant engineer

Artwork

- Kent Howard – Snow logo
- Christopher Wahl – photography
- Darko – design, photography
