= Junior Reid =

Jamaican reggae and dancehall musician

- Born: Delroy Reid; 6 June 1963 (age 62); Kingston, Jamaica
- Genres: Reggae, dancehall, reggae fusion
- Occupations: Singer, producer
- Years active: 1978–present
- Labels: JR Productions, Big Life, Mercury, PolyGram, Greensleeves, Ras
- Member of: Black Uhuru, Voice of Progress
- Website: Official Myspace

Delroy "Junior" Reid (born 6 June 1963) is a Jamaican reggae and dancehall deejay. From 1986 to 1988, he served as lead vocalist for the reggae band Black Uhuru on three albums: Brutal (1986), Positive (1987), and Black Uhuru Live in New York (1988). His solo career is extensive, and is widely regarded as a great of dancehall reggae. He is also known for his guest performances on the Game's 2006 single "It's Okay (One Blood)", as well as the remix of Mims' single, "This Is Why I'm Hot" alongside Baby Cham that same year.

== Biography ==
Reid was born in Kingston, Jamaica, and had a tough upbringing in the city's Waterhouse district, notorious for being one of the most dangerous places in Jamaica. It was there in the politically turbulent late '70s that he recorded his first-ever single "Speak the Truth" at the age of 13 for the late Hugh Mundell, released in Jamaica on Augustus Pablo's Rockers International label, and popular as an import single in the United Kingdom. He followed this with "Know Myself" in 1981. He then went on to form his own band, the Voice of Progress, and after a local hit with "Mini-Bus Driver" the group scored local success with an album of the same name.

By the early 1980s, commissioned by Sugar Minott to record a number of tunes on Minott's Youth Promotion label, enjoying considerable popularity with tracks such as "Human Nature" (produced by Reid), "A1 Lover" (produced by Sugar Minott), and the evergreen "Foreign Mind", an uplifting and proud statement which became an anthem to the ghetto youth whom Reid increasingly championed. Reid transferred his talents to King Jammy's studio on St. Lucia Road where his fast-growing success rose yet another notch. "Boom Shacka Lacka" was his first UK hit and led to another exceptional album. After a number of fine singles – which included "Youthman", "Bank Clerk", "Sufferation", "Give Thanks and Praises" and "Higgler Move". Reid then launched his label "Jr Productions" with his first single "Settle Down" by Barrington Levy.

In 1986, Reid's opportunity to reach a wider international audience came after he was offered a role as Black Uhuru's lead singer, following the departure of Michael Rose. Three of the singles he released with Black Uhuru, "Pain", "Nah Get Rich and Switch", and "Let us Pray" were published on Reid's JR Productions label. His collaboration on the first album with Black Uhuru, the Grammy-nominated Brutal, in 1986, was well received. During this time, he toured Europe, the UK, the US, Canada and Bermuda with Black Uhuru.

Two years and three albums later, Reid departed Black Uhuru for a combination of reasons: he had been unable to establish his own identity in the band, having a style close to Michael Rose’s (a long time contributor to Black Uhuru); the group compositionally suffering difficulties and personal crises. Additionally, Reid was interest to produce his own material, with a desire to regain his domestic popularity, to go solo and into his own studio (One Blood Recording Studio), as well as focusing on his own JR Productions label. During this period, Reid had a 1988 UK number 21 hit with the single "Stop This Crazy Thing", a collaboration with Coldcut. In 1990, he had even more success with "I'm Free", recorded with The Soup Dragons. The song reached number 5 in the UK.

Meanwhile, 1989's "One Blood" saw him re-established at the forefront of the reggae scene. "One Blood" became an anthem for unity in America and around the world. According to Rolling Stone magazine (7 May 2013), the lyrics of "One Blood" were the source of the album title for Vampire Weekend's third release, Modern Vampires of the City.

=== Production work ===
As a producer, Reid has his own production company; JR Productions. He produced two songs on Snow's second album, Murder Love, released in 1995. Reid has collaborated and produced for Dancehall artist Ninjaman, on many occasions since the early 1990s. He has also produced for Mighty Diamonds, Big Youth, Dennis Brown and Gregory Isaacs. He produced all of this work in his own recording studio, which he opened in 1988.

=== Recent work ===
His vocals have been used in the hip hop scene, which debuted as a collaboration on the songs "One Blood Under W" and "Jah World" from The W album by the Wu-Tang Clan, which was released on 21 November 2000. His next collaboration with Guru on the song "Mashing Up the World" on the album "Jaz Mattaz". In 2006, he collaborated with West Coast hip hop artist Game on the song "It's Okay (One Blood)"; The song also samples Reid's 1989 single "One Blood". The song hit the top of the billboards and it was also included in the video game Def Jam: Icon for the Xbox 360 and the PlayStation 3. The song was then remixed again and the official remix was released on 7 November 2006. It features 25 hip-hop artists including The Game.

Reid appeared on the Blackout remix of Mims' "This Is Why I'm Hot" from his debut album M.I.M.S. (Music Is My Savior). This was one of the more popular remixes made in 2007. He recently did a song with Jim Jones, Max B and Mel Matrix called "What A Gwan", which features a sample from Barrington Levy's "Black Roses". Reid is on Fabolous's album From Nothin' to Somethin' on the track "Gangsta Don't Play" and he has collaborated with Fat Joe on the track "More Money". He appeared on the remix of Smitty's song "Died in Your Arms" also featuring Rick Ross and T-Pain. In late 2007 he performed in the "Freedom Concert" in Port Harcourt, Nigeria and also went on to record the remix version of "Free" with De Indispensables, a Nigerian hip hop duo. Reid was also proudly featured on the track "Fire" from San Francisco-based DJ and deep house producer Miguel Migs' 2007 album "Those Things."

On 18 November 2007, Reid performed alongside Alicia Keys at the 2007 American Music Awards. Reid is also featured on a remix version of Alicia Keys' single "No One". He also did a song with Lil Wayne called "Ghetto Youths Rock". In 2008, Reid was featured on Bun B's song "If It Was Up II Me" off his album II Trill.

In 2011, Reid teamed up with Ludacris, T-Pain, Busta Rhymes, Mavado, Bun B, Game, Twista, Jadakiss, Waka Flocka Flame, Fat Joe, Ace Hood & Birdman in the remix of DJ Khaled's "Welcome to My Hood". "Welcome to My Hood" (featuring Rick Ross, Lil Wayne & Plies) is the lead single of DJ Khaled's 5th studio album We the Best Forever.

In May 2013 Reid performed as a headliner at the Reggae on the Hills festival in Barbados. The festival was well attended with over 60,000 people in attendance, the largest crowd in their history, and Reid's appearance was in wide anticipation.

His most recent singles are "Sharing the Night Together", "Never Let you Go", "Same Boat" and are being played widely in Jamaica and across the world.

Reid released a mixtape in May 2013 called Kingston Firehouse which is leading up to his album Junior Reid Living Legend.

In an August 2014 interview with Midnight Raver, record producer Delroy Wright revealed that he has unreleased Reid material from the Firehouse Clash sessions that he is planning to release on his Live & Learn record label.

== Discography ==
=== Albums ===
- One Sufferation (10" vinyl) (1980)
- Boom-Shack-A-Lack (1985) Greensleeves
- Original Foreign Mind (1985)
- One Blood (1990, re-released in 1992) Big Life/Mercury
- Progress (1990)
- Long Road (1991) Cohiba
- Big Timer (1993) VP
- Visa (1994) Greensleeves
- Junior Reid & The Bloods (1995) RAS
- Showers of Blessings (1995)
- Listen to the Voices (1996) RAS
- RAS Portraits (1997) RAS
- True World Order (1997)
- Big Timer (2000)
- Emmanuel Calling (2000) JR Productions and One Blood Music, Jamaica.
- Rasta Government (2003) Penitentiary
- Double Top (2005) Tamoki Wambesi (with Cornell Campbell)
- Firehouse Clash (with Don Carlos)
- Live in Berkeley (2007) 2B1
- Junior Reid, the Living Legend (2015), ABB

==== With Voice of Progress ====
- Mini Bus Driver (1982)
- I'm Free (1990)

==== With Black Uhuru ====
- Brutal (1986)
- Positive (1987)
- Black Uhuru Live in New York (1987)

==== Singles ====
===== As featured performer =====
List of singles, with selected chart positions, showing year released and album name
Title	Year	Peak chart positions									Album
Title	Year	AUS	AUT	GER	IRE	NZ	UK	US	US R&B	US Rap	Album
"Si Wi Dem Nuh Know We" (Snow featuring Ninjaman and Junior Reid)	1994	--	--	--	--	--	--	--	--	--	Murder Love
"It's Okay (One Blood)" (The Game featuring Junior Reid)	2006	68	68	41	16	25	26	71	33	16	Doctor's Advocate
"Who Wan Test" (Nino Brown featuring Mavado and Junior Reid)	2012	--	--	--	--	--	--	--	--	--	We Don't See'em 3

=== DVD ===
- Live in Berkeley (2007) Proper Music Distribution
