= Two Hands Clapping =

Studio album by Snow
- Released: November 19, 2002
- Genres: Reggae; hip-hop
- Length: 52:52
- Label: Virgin Music
- Producers: Laney Stewart; Brent Setterington

Snow chronology
Mind on the Moon (2000)	Two Hands Clapping (2002)

Singles from Two Hands Clapping
- 1. "Legal" Released: 2002

Two Hands Clapping is the sixth album by reggae singer Snow. The lead single "Legal" was a hit on the Canadian Singles Chart, peaking at number 13. It was also Snow's only album to have a Parental Advisory sticker.

== Track listing ==
1. "Black N' Snow"
2. "Stay Ballin'"
3. "That's My Life"
4. "Missing You"
5. "Whass Up"
6. "Pride (Interlude)"
7. "Legal"
8. "The Way That U Do"
9. "Whisper of Truth (Interlude)
10. "Mistaken Identity"
11. "Lonely Song" (featuring Danny P)
12. "Biological
13. "Whole Nine Yards"
14. "Girl"
15. "Cinco de Mayo (Intro)"
16. "Cinco de Mayo"
17. "J Dot"

== Year-end charts ==
2002 year-end chart performance
Chart (2002)	Position
Canadian R&B Albums (Nielsen SoundScan)	151
Canadian Rap Albums (Nielsen SoundScan)	77
