= Daddy Screw =

Jamaican dancehall deejay

- Born: Michael Alexander Johnson; 29 March 1968 (age 57); Kingston, Jamaica
- Genres: Dancehall
- Occupation: Deejay
- Years active: 1984–present
- Labels: VP; Steely & Clevie; Mad House

Michael Alexander Johnson (born 29 March 1968), better known as Daddy Screw, is a Jamaican dancehall deejay best known for his work in the 1980s and 1990s.

== Biography ==
Johnson was born and raised in Kingston, Jamaica, and first began to deejay while still a student at Vauxhall Comprehensive High School. He released his first single ("Dimbo Bucket") in 1984 and worked on sound systems such as Black Stone. He recorded "Madda Mampie" for Tuff Gong Records, and through Tuff Gong producer Tony Kelly he met Dave Kelly, who produced much of his later work, including several Jamaican hit singles. Screw also toured as part of Kelly's 'Mad House Crew', and performance as part of the 'Champions In Action' tour with Tiger, Sanchez, and Terror Fabulous. Two albums were released in the 1990s — Loverman (1993, VP) and Multiple Choice (1996, Steely & Clevie) — and he also appeared on the live album Mad House Crew Live, released in 1994 by French label Pipper.

Daddy Screw has also recorded collaborations and made guest appearances on tracks by several other artists including Terror Fabulous ("Broke Wine Butterfly"), Sharon Forrester ("Money Isn't Everything"), Tinga Stewart ("Dancehall Maniac"), Maxi Priest ("Heartbreaker"), Toyin Adekale ("Man Wid De Agony" and "Second to None") and Barrington Levy ("Girl I Like Your Style").

Screw moved to Denver, Colorado in the United States to live. He headlined the summer concert in Downtown, Denver known as Reggae on the Mall with Aska Askelz Sounds, he also performed live at the Reggae On The Rocks Concert with Jimmy Cliff, Burning Spear, and Third World, Maxi Priest, Prince Oret, Sire, Trini Daddy Christmas, and Aska Askelz Sounds. He ended up living in Aurora, Colorado, for a few years before he returned to Jamaica in the 2000s, recording the single "Caribbean Girls" with Oret Smith.

He still resides in Denver, Colorado, where, in 2016, he was reportedly working on new material.

== Discography ==
=== Albums ===
- Loverman (1993), VP
- Multiple Choice (1996), Steely & Clevie

=== Live albums ===
- Mad House Crew Live (1994), Pipper - with Terror Fabulous & Louie Culture
