= Wouldn't Get Far =

Single by The Game featuring Kanye West

from the album Doctor's Advocate
- Released: January 23, 2007
- Recorded: 2005
- Genre: Hip hop
- Length: 4:11 (Album Version Explicit); 3:51 (Clean Version); 3:38 (Clean Radio Edit)
- Label: Geffen
- Songwriters: Jayceon Taylor; Kanye West; Marliyn McLeod; Pamela Swayer
- Producer: Kanye West

The Game singles chronology
"Let's Ride" (2006)	"Wouldn't Get Far" (2007)	"Game's Pain" (2008)

Kanye West singles chronology
"Number One" (2006)	"Wouldn't Get Far" (2007)	"I Still Love H.E.R." (2007)

Music video
- "Wouldn't Get Far" on YouTube

"Wouldn't Get Far" is a song by American rapper the Game, released by Geffen Records on January 23, 2007 as the third single from his second studio album, Doctor's Advocate. The song, produced by and featuring Kanye West, finds the Game criticizing, by both name and alias, up-and-coming and established video vixens. "Wouldn't Get Far" peaked at number 64 on the Billboard Hot 100 chart and reached numbers 11 and 26 on the Billboard Hot Rap Songs and Hot R&B/Hip-Hop Songs charts, respectively.

== Background ==
In 2007, producer and guest performer Kanye West revealed that the beat for the song was originally intended for Common, and if the Game had turned it down, West would have used it for himself.

== Composition ==
In the song, The Game mentions and criticizes, by both name and alias, many up-and coming and established video vixens, models, and actresses. The women addressed include Karrine Steffans, Vida Guerra, Meagan Good, Gabrielle Union, Hoopz, Lil' Kim, Charli Baltimore, Toccara Jones, and Melyssa Ford.

In the song, Gabrielle Union, Meagan Good, Gloria Velez, and Toccara Jones are mentioned in a somewhat negative manner. Melyssa Ford has said she was disappointed with both The Game and Kanye West for creating the song. As a response, Guerra and Hoopz made a 30-second rap diss to The Game in retaliation to his pejorative remarks about how video models succeed in the business. She insinuates that he is desperate for her. Earlier, she had claimed that The Game was mad at her for turning him down.

After the final verse of the song, The Game paraphrases Snoop Dogg's final verse at the end of 2Pac's song "All Bout U" from his 1996 album All Eyez on Me, mentioning all the places he "sees the same hos", using current artists and events like West and Oprah Winfrey covering Hurricane Katrina. However, this portion of the song is not available on the radio edited version or the music video.

== Music video ==
Prior to filming the music video, The Game said that he was hoping some of the video vixens he mentions in the song would come down for the shoot to lighten some of the tension that had built because of the track lyrics. In the end, only Gloria Velez and Nicole Alexander turned up and are seen in the video; the others are played by look-alikes.

The music video premiered on BET's Access Granted on Wednesday, January 31, 2007. Pitbull, Pharrell (as a skateboarder), Black Wall Street artist Juice, porn star Aurora Jolie, actor Tyrese Gibson, Lil Jon, and the video director Bryan Barber all made cameo appearances in the video. On December 31 of the same year, the video appeared at number 95 on BET's Notarized: Top 100 Videos of 2007 countdown.

== Remix ==
A remix featuring Jay-Z was featured on The Game's mixtape Mick Boogie - The Dope Game 2.

== Charts ==
=== Weekly charts ===
Chart (2007)	Peak position
US Billboard Hot 100	64
US Hot R&B/Hip-Hop Songs (Billboard)	26
US Hot Rap Songs (Billboard)	11
US Rhythmic Airplay (Billboard)	30

=== Year-end charts ===
Chart (2007)	Position
UK Urban (Music Week)	20
US Hot R&B/Hip-Hop Songs (Billboard)	100

== Certifications ==
Region	Certification	Certified units/sales
New Zealand (RMNZ)	Gold	15,000^{‡}
^{‡} Sales+streaming figures based on certification alone.
