= Toyin Adekale =

British Lovers rock singer

Toyin Adekale (often referred to as Toyin; born 21 December 1963) is a British lovers rock singer.

Adekale first had success as a member of London reggae band The Instigators, which also featured Mafia & Fluxy. She topped the British reggae chart with her single "Let's Make Love". She went on to form the group Pure and Simple, also managing the group. She was one of a number of reggae artists to contribute to the British Reggae Artists Famine Appeal, singing on the "Let's Make Africa Green Again" charity single in 1985.

Adekale has graced the stage of Presidents and Royalty, performing at the Kremlin in Russia, Buckingham Palace in London, and the Houses of Parliament. Performing for HRH Prince Charles, the former President of Nigeria Olusegun Obasanjo, also the Sierra Leonian late President Joseph Saidu Momoh, amongst other dignitaries and celebrities.

After Adekale's 13-year stint with world-famous band Boney M featuring Maizie Williams, she left for the United States, taking time out of her successful 35-year span in show business.

Adekale's most memorable hits are "Touch A Four Leaf Clover" produced by Anthony Brightley on the Sir George Label. There followed hits with Delroy Murray and Robin Achampong of Total Contrast, "Gee Baby", "Here I Go Again" and the Love n Leather album. She had a combination hit in 1995 with Daddy Screw with "Man With The Agony".

She has worked with many artists such as Soul II Soul, and Maxi Priest. Music brought Adekale to the world of theater via her friend and director Larrington Walker for the Afro Sax Theater company. They brought some to the British acting platform, such as Ellen Thomas and Treva Etienne.

Since living in the US, Adekale has also penned her first book, I Do, Do You?, and has since penned her first produced play taken from the book, called It's Not Over Til It's Over.

== Discography ==
- "Let's Make Love" (1980), Love Birds
- "Touch A 4 Leaf Clover" (1983), Sir George Label
- Love 'N' Leather (1985), Criminal Records
- "Gee Baby" (1988), Criminal Records
- "Here I Go Again" (1985) Criminal Records
- "Jealousy" (1996), Merger Records
- From Me to You (2000), Jet Star
- I'll Be Moving On (2005), Talithavoices
- "When" (2004), Talithavoices
- No Fear album (2011), Talithavoices
- "I Do, Do You?" (2010), Talithavoices
- "The Storm is Over" (2011), Talithavoices
- "With You I'm Born Again" (2012), Talithavoices
- The Storm is Over - Sunshine's Here (2014), Talithavoices
- "Thank You Mama" (2016), Talithavoices
- "Raining Abundance" (H&H Mix) (2019) Talithavoices
- "I'm That Woman" (2022) Talithavoices
