= Everybody Wants to Be Like You =

2000 single by Snow

Single by Snow

from the album Cooler Conditions and Mind on the Moon
- Released: 28 July 2000
- Length: 3:20 (album version); 3:09 (radio edit)
- Label: Virgin Music Canada
- Songwriters: Darrin O'Brien; Robbie Patterson; Glenn Marais; Shawn Moltke
- Producer: Mike Tucker

Snow singles chronology
"Someday Somehow" (1999)	"Everybody Wants to Be Like You" (2000)	"Plumb Song" (2000)

"Everybody Wants to Be Like You" is a song by Canadian pop-reggae singer Snow from his 2000 album, Mind on the Moon. The song became one of Snow's highest-peaking hits in Canada, reaching number two on both the Canadian Singles Chart and the RPM 100 Hit Tracks chart in October 2000.

== Awards and honours ==
In 2001, the Society of Composers, Authors, and Music Publishers of Canada honored "Everybody Wants to Be Like You" for reaching the number one spot on MuchMusic and for topping MuchMoreMusic's video countdown.

== Track listing ==
Canadian CD single

1. "Everybody Wants to Be Like You" (radio edit) – 3:09
2. "Everybody Wants to Be Like You" (album version) – 3:20
3. "Everybody Wants to Be Like You" (reggae vocal) – 3:20

== Charts ==
=== Weekly charts ===
Weekly chart performance for "Everybody Wants to Be Like You"
Chart (2000)	Peak position
Canada (Nielsen SoundScan)	2
Canada Top Singles (RPM)	2
Canada Adult Contemporary (RPM)	13

=== Year-end charts ===
Year-end chart performance for "Everybody Wants to Be Like You"
Chart (2001)	Position
Canada (Nielsen SoundScan)	135
Canada Radio (Nielsen BDS)	72
