= It's Okay (One Blood) =

2006 single by The Game

Single by The Game featuring Junior Reid

from the album Doctor's Advocate
- Released: July 24, 2006
- Recorded: 2006
- Genre: West Coast hip-hop; reggae fusion; gangsta rap
- Length: 4:17
- Label: Geffen
- Songwriters: D. Collington, Delroy Reid, Sharif Slater, Jayceon Taylor
- Producers: D-Roc, Reefa

The Game singles chronology
"Put You on the Game" (2005)	"It's Okay (One Blood)" (2006)	"Let's Ride" (2006)

Junior Reid singles chronology
"One Sufferation" (2003)	"It's Okay (One Blood)" (2006)	"Stand Up/Come Fight Me" (2006)

Music video
- "It's Okay (One Blood)" on YouTube

"It's Okay (One Blood)" is a song by American rapper The Game featuring vocals from reggae singer Junior Reid, from his second studio album Doctor's Advocate. Released as the album's lead single on July 24, 2006, the song was written by The Game himself and Junior Reid, and it was produced by D-Roc and Reefa. The Game himself revealed that the song would be released on July 31, 2006, but actually was released on July 24, 2006. The song was originally to be released on July 4, 2006 but got pushed back by The Game. Jimmy Rosemond, head of Czar Entertainment and The Game's manager, explained how "One Blood" would receive positive radio airplay and prove the talent that The Game had. A supposed original version of the song was released in late January 2011.

== Background ==
When news of The Game's first single was announced by Rosemond, it was revealed simply as "One Blood" and is the name it commonly goes by (also, the words "Blood" and "One Blood" are repeated throughout the song). The song samples Junior Reid's "One Blood" and features Junior Reid himself. According to Reefa, the producer of the song, "One Blood" was mixed by Mike Dean for Dean's List Productions.

Several lines in the song stirred controversy as to who the lines were aimed at: "You 38 and you still rapping, ugh", was aimed at Jay-Z, as well as a diss at snap music; "Turn on the TV and all you see is the A/You niggaz better make up a dance and try to get radio play/Keep on snapping your fingers, I ain't going away." After people thought he made a diss to Atlanta, GA, The Game later clarified who he was referring to in a radio interview with HOT 107.9 and said the following:

Banks and Buck have albums coming out near to mines, you know what I'm saying? So I'm telling them if they trying to sell some records this time, then they better fly to the "A" and get to, you know, doing something, you know? Y'all make up a dance to the song, you know what I'm saying? It's all good. And you know, just to say it again man, I'M NOT DISSING THE "A"!

In the song, The Game mentions the following rappers, in order, and some repeated: Dr. Dre, 50 Cent, Snoop Dogg, Eazy-E, Young Jeezy, Jay-Z, Lil Jon, The Notorious B.I.G., Ice Cube, Nas and 2Pac.

This song is also included in the video game Def Jam: Icon for the PlayStation 3 Xbox 360. The Game appears in the video game as a playable character and provides his own voice and likeness. It is 1 of 2 songs by The Game that he can fight to.

== Music video ==
The Game made a music video for the song, which debuted on BET on August 22, 2006. The video features revised lyrics in order to accommodate television decency standards. There are appearances in the video by Juice, Ya Boy, Nu Jerzey Devil, DJ Skee, Andrew Reid, Wada Blood, Young JR, Mickey Jarrett Jr and Tyrese. This video peaked #76 on BET's Notarized: The Top 100 of 2006.

== Remixes ==
An official remix was released on November 7, 2006. It features 25 hip-hop artists including The Game. They rap in this order:

- Jim Jones, Snoop Dogg, Nas, T.I., The Game, Fat Joe, Lil Wayne, N.O.R.E., Jadakiss, Styles P, Fabolous, Juelz Santana, Rick Ross, Twista, Tha Dogg Pound (Kurupt & Daz Dillinger), WC, E-40, Bun B, Chamillionaire, Slim Thug, Young Dro, Clipse (Pusha T & No Malice), Ja Rule. The song begins with "Dre, I See More Dead People". It is 11 minutes and 50 seconds long.

The Game also developed 3 regional remixes. They are:

- One Blood Dirty South Remix: Lil Wayne, Rick Ross, Twista, T.I., Chamillionaire, Pitbull, Slim Thug, Young Dro, & Bun B (Begins with "Dre, I'm in the South") The Game only says "Remix" in the chorus.
- One Blood West Coast Remix: Snoop Dogg, Tha Dogg Pound, WC, E-40, Crooked I, & Glasses Malone (Begins song with "Dre, I see Gangbangers") The Game has a new verse for this version.
- One Blood East Coast Remix: Jim Jones, Fabolous, Clipse, Juelz Santana (extended verse), Nas, Jadakiss, Styles P, Fat Joe, N.O.R.E. & Ja Rule (Begins with "Dre, I saved hip-hop") The Game only says "Remix" in the chorus.

All these remixes are available at Mick Boogies - The Dope Game 2.

N.O.R.E. extended his verse with a freestyle in the mixtape "Cocaine On Steroids". Lil Keke has made a freestyle to this song.

Others remixes:

- The Game Feat. Cam'ron.
- The Game Feat. Red Cafe, Hell Rell and JR Writer.
- The Game Feat. Mitchy Slick.

== Track listing ==
=== CD single ===
1. "It's Okay"
2. "Dreams"

=== 12-inch vinyl ===
==== A-side ====
1. "It's Okay" (Album version)

==== B-side ====
1. "Dreams" (Album version)
2. "It's Okay" (Instrumental)

== Charts ==
Chart (2006–07)	Peak position
Australia (ARIA)	68
Australian Urban (ARIA)	12
Austria (Ö3 Austria Top 40)	68
European Hot 100 Singles (Billboard)	49
Finland (Suomen virallinen lista)	9
Germany (Media Control AG)	41
Ireland (IRMA)	16
New Zealand (Recorded Music NZ)	25
Scotland Singles (OCC)	29
UK Singles (OCC)	26
UK Hip Hop/R&B (OCC)	2
US Billboard Hot 100	71
US Hot R&B/Hip-Hop Songs (Billboard)	33
US Hot Rap Songs (Billboard)	16
US Rhythmic Airplay (Billboard)	34
