= Sexy Girl (Snow song) =

Single by Snow

from the album Murder Love
- Released: July 5, 1995
- Recorded: 1995
- Genre: Reggae, hip-hop
- Length: 4:38
- Label: EastWest Records America, Atlantic
- Songwriters: Darrin O'Brien; Shawn Moltke; John Ficarrotta; Ray Basora
- Producer: M.C. Shan

Snow singles chronology
"Anything for You" (1995)	"Sexy Girl" (1995)	"Boom Boom Boogie" (1996)

"Sexy Girl" is a song by Canadian reggae musician Snow, released in July 1995 as a single from his second album, Murder Love (1995).

== Critical reception ==
Gil Robertson IV from Cash Box wrote, "This new single from Snow’s Murder Love disc is a winner. It has a stylized upbeat and highly danceable beat, and Snow’s rap resonates with a bouncy provocative flavor that will make it one of the party favorites of the summer."

== Charts ==
Chart (1995)	Peak position
Canada Top Singles (RPM)	80
El Salvador (UPI)	3
