= Girl I've Been Hurt =

1993 single by Snow

"Girl, I've Been Hurt"

Single by Snow

from the album 12 Inches of Snow
- Released: April 15, 1993
- Genre: Pop; hip hop; reggae
- Length: 4:10
- Label: EastWest America; Motor Jam
- Songwriters: Edmond Leary; Darrin O'Brien; Shawn Moltke
- Producer: M.C. Shan

Snow singles chronology
"Informer" (1992)	"Girl, I've Been Hurt" (1993)	"Si Wi Dem Nuh Know We" (1994)

"Girl I've Been Hurt" is a song by Canadian reggae musician Snow, released in April 1993 by EastWest America as the second single from his debut album, 12 Inches of Snow (1993). The song was written by Edmond Leary, Darrin O'Brien (real name of Snow) and Shawn Moltke, and produced by M.C. Shan. Following the wildly successful single "Informer," "Girl I've Been Hurt" peaked at number 19 on the US Billboard Hot 100, and charted internationally as well. In both Finland and Portugal, it was a top-10 hit.

== Music and lyrics ==
While "Informer" documented a false murder charge and prison life, "Girl I’ve Been Hurt" presented a more sensitive theme, revolving around a breakup between a man and a woman in a relationship. The protagonist discovers that his "girl" has been cheating on him and he promptly dumps her and professes his desire to "find another lover." Whereas Jamaican patois-inspired lyrics conveyed the meaning of "Informer," "Girl I've Been Hurt" mixed Snow's sensitive crooning with a short reggae bridge.

== Critical reception ==
Larry Flick from Billboard magazine wrote, "The pop/hip-hop community's latest star follows his platinum-selling smash, 'Informer', with a languid ditty that will solidify his presence at several radio formats. A slick beat-base is firm support for a catchy, sing-along chorus and occasional toasting." A reviewer from Music & Media said, "Just for your information, sometimes it snows in May. The white ragga man now tries his luck with a ballad and the snowball effect will continue on EHR and dance radio." Alan Jones from Music Week gave it a score of four out of five, calling it "both powerful and different." He added, "The smooth, loping bass mix by Sly & Robbie is exemplary and makes for a more subtle song." Johnny Dee from NME was less enthustiastic, viewing it as "a boring swing-beatish smoothy-woothy smoocher for the ladeeez in the house."

== Music video ==
The original music video for the song features Snow pursuing scantily clad women in an isolated, winter terrain. By the end of the video, at an outdoor party that includes a snowball fight, Snow hooks up with "another lover." The video featured much of Snow's early entourage, including his former DJ Marvin Prince, David Eng and the late EZ Steve Salem. In addition, a second "boggle" remix video of "Girl I’ve Been Hurt" appeared and featured the "Snow girls" audition.

== Live performances ==
While performing at Sunsplash '93, Ninjaman asked Snow to sing "Girl I've Been Hurt," saying: "Come up and sing 'Girl I've Been Hurt' because I like that song. If you sing that and the audience doesn't go crazy, I'll shoot everyone in the crowd!"

As Reggae Report observed, "fortunately, the crowd went wild for his performance and Ninja never had to make good on his threats!"

== Track listings ==
- CD maxi
1. "Girl, I've Been Hurt" (edit) — 4:01
2. "Girl, I've Been Hurt" (remix) — 3:57
3. "Girl, I've Been Hurt" (Dunbar remix by Sly & Robbie) — 4:00
4. "Girl, I've Been Hurt" (Warm edit) — 4:58
- 7-inch single
1. "Girl I've Been Hurt" (radio edit) — 4:01
2. "Informer" — 4:28
- 12-inch maxi
1. "Girl, I've Been Hurt" (Dunbar remix by Sly & Robbie) — 4:00
2. "Girl, I've Been Hurt" (Warm edit) — 5:48
3. "Girl, I've Been Hurt" (Dunbar instrumental) — 4:01

== Personnel ==
- Writers: Darrin O'Brien, Edmund Leary, Shawn Moltke
- Producer: MC Shan
- Executive producer: David Eng, EZ Steve Salem
- Co-producers: Edmund Leary, John "Jumpstreet" Ficarotta

== Charts ==
Chart (1993)	Peak position
Australia (ARIA)	26
Belgium (Ultratop 50 Flanders)	30
Canada Top Singles (RPM)	28
Europe (Eurochart Hot 100)	74
Europe (European Hit Radio)	38
Finland (Suomen virallinen lista)	7
Iceland (Íslenski Listinn Topp 40)	24
Ireland (IRMA)	20
Netherlands (Dutch Top 40)	21
Netherlands (Single Top 100)	28
New Zealand (Recorded Music NZ)	17
Portugal (AFP)	10
Sweden (Sverigetopplistan)	37
UK Singles (Official Charts)	48
US Billboard Hot 100	19
US Hot R&B/Hip-Hop Songs (Billboard)	78
US Pop Airplay (Billboard)	25
US Rhythmic Airplay (Billboard)	9
US Cash Box Top 100	17

== Release history ==
Region	Date	Format(s)	Label(s)	Ref.
United States	April 15, 1993	—N/a	EastWest America; Motor Jam	
Australia	July 5, 1993	CD; cassette	EastWest America; Motor Jam	
