= Doctor's Advocate =

Studio album by the Game
- Released: November 14, 2006
- Recorded: 2005–2006
- Studios: Encore (Burbank); The Record Plant (Hollywood, Los Angeles); Sony Studios (New York City)
- Genres: West Coast hip-hop; gangsta rap; hardcore hip-hop
- Length: 73:18
- Label: Geffen
- Producers: The Game (exec.); Jimmy Rosemond (co-exec.); D-Roc; DJ Khalil; Ervin "E.P." Pope; Hi-Tek; J. R. Rotem; Jellyroll; Just Blaze; Kanye West; Mike Chav; Mr. Porter; Nottz; Reefa; Scott Storch; Swizz Beatz; will.i.am

The Game chronology
The Documentary (2005)	Doctor's Advocate (2006)	LAX (2008)

Alternative cover

Singles from Doctor's Advocate
- 1. "It's Okay (One Blood)" Released: July 24, 2006; 2. "Let's Ride" Released: September 4, 2006; 3. "Wouldn't Get Far" Released: December 12, 2006

Doctor's Advocate is the second studio album by American rapper the Game, released on November 14, 2006, through Geffen Records. The album is his second major-label release, following 2005's The Documentary, which was released under Aftermath Entertainment, G-Unit Records and Interscope Records. Due to his disputes with G-Unit leader and founder 50 Cent, Game left Aftermath and G-Unit; he was later transferred from Interscope to its division, Geffen Records, another label under Universal Music Group's Interscope Geffen A&M faction to terminate his contractual obligations with G-Unit, in the summer of 2006.

Despite the absence of Dr. Dre, who executive produced Game's debut record, The Documentary, the album featured production by four other returning producers—Kanye West, Just Blaze, Scott Storch and Hi-Tek—as well as will.i.am and Swizz Beatz. Production for the album was also contributed by DJ Khalil, Jellyroll, Jonathan "J.R." Rotem, Mr. Porter, Nottz, Reefa, Ervin "E.P." Pope and D-Roc, among others.

Doctor's Advocate debuted at number one on the U.S. Billboard 200, selling 358,000 copies in its first week, making it Game's second number one album on the chart.

Guests featured on Doctor's Advocate include Busta Rhymes, Kanye West, Nas, Nate Dogg, Snoop Dogg, Tha Dogg Pound, Jamie Foxx and Xzibit. Upon its release, the album received favorable reviews, with music critics praising the album's production and the Game's improved lyricism. Game made a point to prove that he could still make good music and be a successful artist, as he did on The Documentary, without the help from Dr. Dre or 50 Cent. As with The Documentary, Doctor's Advocate was distributed in the United Kingdom by Polydor Records, which is the British distributor for Interscope Geffen A&M releases. Game later called Doctor's Advocate the best album of his career in 2012.

== Background ==
When Game signed onto Aftermath Entertainment, it was later arranged that he would work with 50 Cent and his hip-hop group G-Unit. The sudden feud between the pair, who had been marketed as having a mentor/protégé relationship, started soon afterwards. The two were able to put their differences aside for the release of the Game's debut album, The Documentary which was released on January 18, 2005. The album was a success for Game and had three singles that featured 50 Cent. The release date of 50 Cent's second album, The Massacre, was pushed back in order to accommodate Game's album, causing a rift between 50 Cent and Interscope Records. Tensions would rise during the filming of the music video for Game's third single, "Hate It or Love It", when 50 Cent refused to shoot a scene in the front seat of a car with Game, instead sitting in the back (Game's brother, Big Fase 100, would replace him).

50 Cent later dismissed Game from G-Unit on Hot 97 radio. 50 Cent also claimed that he was not getting his proper credit for the creation of Game's debut album and he claimed that he wrote six of the songs, which Game denied. After the announcement, Game, who was a guest earlier in the evening, attempted to enter the building with his entourage. After being denied entry, one of his associates was shot in the leg during a confrontation with a group of men leaving the building. When the situation escalated, both rappers held a press conference to announce their reconciliation. Fans had mixed feelings as to whether the rappers created a publicity stunt to boost the sales of the albums they had just released. Nevertheless, even after the situation deflated, G-Unit criticized the Game's street cred. The group denounced the Game and announced that he will not be featured on their albums. During a Summer Jam performance, the Game launched a boycott of G-Unit called "G-Unot".

After the performance at Summer Jam, Game responded with "300 Bars and Runnin'", an extended "diss" aimed at G-Unit as well as members of Roc-A-Fella Records on the mixtape You Know What It Is Vol. 3. 50 Cent responded through his "Piggy Bank" music video, which features the Game as a Mr. Potato Head doll and also parodies other rivals. Since then both groups continued to attack each other. The Game released two more mixtapes, Ghost Unit and a mixtape/DVD called Stop Snitchin, Stop Lyin.

G-Unit posted a cover of Game's head on the body of a male stripper for "Hate It or Love It (G-Unit Radio Part 21)" mixtape, as a response to Game displaying pictures of G-Unit dressed as Village People. Although he was signed to Aftermath Entertainment, the Game left the label due to his dispute with 50 Cent. Doing so, he was drafted from Interscope Records to its subsidiary label, Geffen Records (another label under Universal Music Group's Interscope Geffen A&M division) to terminate his contractual obligations with G-Unit in the summer of 2006, although reports claim 50 Cent pressured Dr. Dre to kick him off. G-Unit member Spider Loc had also begun to insult the Game on various songs. In addition, the Game released "240 Bars (Spider Joke)" and "100 Bars (The Funeral)" both attacking G-Unit, Spider Loc and others. 50 Cent's response was "Not Rich, Still Lyin'" where he mocks the Game. Lloyd Banks replied to the Game on a Rap City freestyle booth session. The Game quickly released a "diss" record called "SoundScan" where the Game pokes fun at Lloyd Banks' album Rotten Apple falling thirteen spots on the Billboard 200 chart and disappointing second week sales. Lloyd Banks replied on his mixtape Mo' Money in the Bank Pt. 5: Gang Green Season Continues with a song called "Showtime (The Game's Over)". Lloyd Banks states that 50 Cent wrote half of the Game's first album The Documentary and pokes fun at the Game's suicidal thoughts.

In October 2006, the Game extended a peace treaty to 50 Cent, which was not immediately replied to. However, a couple days later, on Power 106, he stated that the treaty was only offered for one day. On Doctor's Advocate, Game claims that the feud is over on several songs.

== Music ==
=== Lyrics ===
Doctor's Advocate contains various staples of West Coast hip-hop albums including explicit rhymes about gang violence, drug use and sex. The album looks into the Game's relationship with his former mentor Dr. Dre on several tracks, most notably "Doctor's Advocate" which also features former Aftermath Entertainment rapper Busta Rhymes. This album is known for its heavy West Coast hip-hop sound, something that didn't feature much in his debut The Documentary. He worked with a number of west coast artists such as Nate Dogg, Snoop Dogg, Xzibit and Tha Dogg Pound. Rapreviews said "He is absolutely quintessentially relentlessly and unapologetically thugging it up on this CD, but unless your name is Joe Lieberman or Tipper Gore you're gonna enjoy the hell out of the dope beats and lyrical bravado and be begging for more." DJBooth praised his lyrical skills by saying "to briefly touch on the lyrics, only Eminem and Lil’ Wayne are currently equals." However, once again many critics panned the Game's namedropping throughout the album, but Steve Juon of Rapreviews says that "some accused him of being a "name dropper" back then and still will today, the references seem more in keeping with his "soldier of the West" philosophy and less like a filler for lack of content."

=== Production ===
While the Game originally claimed Dr. Dre would still do production on the album in the November issue of XXL magazine, he admitted in September (after the XXL interview was conducted) during an interview on radio station Power 105 that Dr. Dre would not be producing any tracks (although four previously unreleased tracks produced by Dr. Dre were released on the internet, but no reason was given as to why they were not included on the album).

The production on the album was praised by critics. Allmusic writer David Jeffries stated: "beat-makers like Kanye West, Just Blaze, Scott Storch and Swizz Beatz are all on fire" and went on to praise will.i.am's return to his "hood sound after years with the polished Black Eyed Peas". A.V. Club's Nathan Rabin noted that the beats created a "gleaming, hydraulics-enhanced '64 Impala of an album to ride".

With its use of more West Coast-type beats, crispier drums, and deeper bass, the album leans more towards the West Coast sound than The Documentary. The album's production stands out with its combination of sampling and live instrumentation. Tracks like "Why You Hate the Game" combine soul samples with string arrangements, and piano-playing, while other tracks like "Remedy" rely heavily on sped-up funk samples. "Too Much" was noted for being an "ABBA-inspired disco-thump", while "Remedy" revolves around "pilfering Public Enemy's hard-hitting sound". The production on "Ol' English" was depicted as "slow-rolling" music, and "Compton" was declared a "return to old-fashioned gangsta rap". "Why You Hate the Game" was driven by a "sparkling piano-heavy...track". Production for the album would also be contributed by DJ Khalil, Hi-Tek, Jellyroll, Jonathan "J.R." Rotem, Mr. Porter, Nottz, Reefa, Ervin "E.P." Pope and D-Roc.

== Title ==
Doctor's Advocate explicitly refers to Game's former mentor and producer Dr. Dre, whose name is dropped on every song from the album except "Wouldn't Get Far". During several of the songs, Game uses words like "family" and "father" to pay tribute to their relationship before at Aftermath Entertainment. Dre associate Busta Rhymes is brought in as a guest on the title track.

== Release and promotion ==
As the release date of Doctor's Advocate approached, it became unclear, due to the G-Unit contract, whether the album be released by Aftermath Entertainment or Interscope Records. Due to his disputes with 50 Cent, in summer 2006 the Game left Aftermath Entertainment and signed with Geffen Records, another label under Universal Music Group's Interscope-Geffen-A&M, division to terminate his contractual obligations with G-Unit.

On September 7, 2005, the Game released a promotional mixtape, Ghost Unit through 101 Distribution and West Side Entertainment, intended to promote Doctor's Advocate.

On December 3, 2005, the Game released another promotional mixtape album/DVD, Stop Snitchin–Stop Lyin, through The Black Wall Street Records. The mixtape features artists Lil' Kim, Ice Cube, Lil Rob, Chingy, WC, Paul Wall and others. The DVD is directed by Éngel Thedford of AREA51 Media Group. This mixtape is the third of three diss mixtapes aimed at the G-Unit members. It is quite possibly the most popular of the three due to the DVD advertisement. It also features disses by other Black Wall Street Members. Repeatedly DJ Clue? says "Come on Game it's the last one" suggesting there would be no more diss tracks or mixtapes aimed at G-Unit any more. The track "Niggaz Bleed" is a subliminal diss to Suge Knight. In 2006 the mixtape was certified platinum in Ireland, which sold 15,000 units, and the DVD was certified gold.

Doctor's Advocate was finally released on November 14, 2006, through Geffen Records.

=== Singles ===
The first single, "It's Okay (One Blood)", peaked at 71 on the Billboard Hot 100". The Game had earlier stated that the song would be released on July 31, 2006, but it was released on July 24. The song was originally to be released on July 4, but got pushed back by the Game. Jimmy Rosemond, head of Czar Entertainment and the Game's manager, explained how "One Blood" would receive positive radio airplay and prove the talent that the Game has. It features Junior Reid and is produced by Reefa. The second single, "Let's Ride", peaked at 46 on the Billboard Hot 100. The song was written by the Game and Scott Storch and was released on September 25, 2006. The Game mentioned on radio station KDAY in Los Angeles, California that the track was recorded in Miami, Florida, but had the feel of a West Coast Dr. Dre record. The song heavily references Dr. Dre's 1993 hit "Let Me Ride". "Let's Ride" received mediocre reviews from music critics. MusicOMH wrote that the track "lacks in any of the vigour and enthusiasm that came with his debut major release album". Pitchfork gave the song a negative review saying, "What an embarrassment this song turned out to be, lumberingly obvious and poorly crafted from the first awkward gang reference to the last Dre namedrop." About.com's Henry Adaso called the track "just another boring mantra devoid of substance" with the Game delivering "a lethargic sprawl, replete with 50 Cent-esque crooning and tautological Dre odes ("Ain't nuthin' but a G thang, baby, it's a G thang")." Entertainment Weekly, in a review of Doctor's Advocate, wrote that the song "recycle[s] Dre's signature high-pitched synths and plinking pianos" and is "marred by stale rhymes chronicling cartoonish gangbanging." Chocolate magazine said the track "lacks charisma and substance, and is filled with 50 Cent-style tuneless crooning, endless name checks for Aftermath, Eminem and Dr. Dre and empty lyrics". The third single, "Wouldn't Get Far", peaked at 64 on the Billboard Hot 100". The song is produced by and features a verse from Kanye West. It contains a sample from Creative Source's "I'd Find You Anywhere" (which was also sampled on Jadakiss' "By Your Side"), and a sample from "Long Red (Live)" by Mountain. Kanye West revealed that the beat for the song was originally made for Common, and if the Game had turned it down, Kanye would have used it for himself.

== Reception ==
=== Commercial performance ===
The album debuted at No. 1 on the Billboard 200, selling well over 358,000 copies in its 1st week. The album would go on as the Game's 2nd No. 1 album in a row. The album also charted at No. 1 on the Top R&B/Hip-Hop Albums chart, and at No. 1 on the Top Rap Albums chart. As of October 2007, the album has sold 969,000 copies in the United States of America, according to Nielsen SoundScan.

Doctor's Advocate attained respectable international charting. In Australia the album entered the Australian Albums Chart at No. 20, in Austria the album entered the Austrian Albums Chart at No. 12, in Canada the album entered the Canadian Albums Chart at No. 2, in the Netherlands the album entered the Dutch Albums Chart at No. 19, in France the album entered the French Albums Chart at No. 9, in Germany the album entered the German Albums Chart at No. 17, in the Republic of Ireland the album entered the Irish Albums Chart at No. 8, in New Zealand the album entered the New Zealand Albums Chart at No. 15, in Norway the album entered the Norwegian Albums Chart at No. 14, in Switzerland the album entered the Swiss Albums Chart at No. 15.

In the United Kingdom the British Phonographic Industry certified the album Gold, and in New Zealand the Recording Industry Association of New Zealand also certified the album Gold.

=== Critical response ===
Professional ratings
Aggregate scores
Source	Rating
Metacritic	73/100
Review scores
Source	Rating
AllMusic	4/5 stars
Entertainment Weekly	B
The Guardian	3/5 stars
The New York Times	(favorable)
Pitchfork	(8.1/10)
PopMatters	(7/10)
Rolling Stone	3/5 stars
The Source	4.5/5 stars
USA Today	3/4 stars
The Village Voice	(favorable)

Upon its release, Doctor's Advocate received generally positive reviews from music critics. It received an average score of 73 out of 100 based on 20 reviews. AllMusic writer David Jeffries wrote that while the album "is nothing new" from The Documentary, "the fact remains that every track here is as good as or better than those on his debut." Entertainment Weekly disagreed, saying "it doesn't live up to the nihilistic brilliance" of his previous album. Christian Hoard of Rolling Stone stated that the album "isn't the classic that message boards are calling it, but it is a middling yet pleasurable record." Hoard also wrote that "lyrically, it's a mixed bag. The Game is still kind of corny, but his skills have improved... He's more nimble and more assured than before, and he switches up his flow more often". . Stylus Magazine noted that the Game "brought his personality—occasionally funny, disarmingly needy, a little lunkheaded—into the booth" and that despite Dr. Dre's absence, "the album sounds just as big-budget and lavishly appointed as The Documentary". The New York Times shared this view saying, "this album sounds much more like a Los Angeles album than its predecessor" and that the rapper "has a terrific voice, bassy and raspy." Similarly, The A.V. Club wrote that the Game "boasts a raspy-voiced, belligerent charisma" and that the album "succeeds primarily on the strength of its beats." The album received a near perfect 4.5 mic rating from The Source.

Pitchfork stated "As rap music, the Doctor’s Advocate is good; as tangled psychodrama, it's better." Jeff Vrabel of PopMatters wrote "Slapping Dre’s name so front and center just tastes weird, like Alanis re-recording Jagged Little Pill or Queen touring without Freddie Mercury: Awk-ward. Ultimately, for all its naked ambition, "Advocate" ends up proving that without the guiding hand of Dre, Game can ... sound like Dre. Just listen to him, he'll tell you. But without that ability to hammer out his own identity, the Game is still in progress." Stylus Magazine stated "Despite the fact that Dre had nothing to do with this project, the album sounds just as big-budget and lavishly appointed as The Documentary. Like his mentor, Game knows how to tweak the bone-rattling clap of the snare and play up the percussive aspect of keyboards."

=== Accolades ===
The album appeared on numerous music critics' and publications' end-of-year albums lists. Stylus Magazine placed the album at number 35 on its list of their Top 50 Albums of 2006. Kelefa Sannehof of The New York Times named it the sixth best album of 2006, on its list of Best Albums of 2006. They also said that it was the best hip-hop album of the year. Prefix named it the tenth best album of 2006, on its list of Best Albums of 2006.

== Track listing ==
No.	Title	Writer(s)	Producer(s)	Length
1.	"Lookin' at You"	Jayceon Taylor; Ervin "E.P." Pope	E.P.	3:37
2.	"Da Shit"	Taylor; Khalil Abdul-Rahman; Janeen Jasmine; Zoogz Rift	DJ Khalil	5:23
3.	"It's Okay (One Blood)" (featuring Junior Reid)	Taylor; Delroy Reid; Sharif Slater; Danny "D-Roc" Collington	Reefa; D-Roc (co.)	4:17
4.	"Compton" (featuring will.i.am)	Taylor; Will Adams; Andre Wicker; Arlandis Hinton; Curtis Mayfield; David Weldon; Eric Wright; Jesse Bonds Weaver, Jr.	will.i.am	4:41
5.	"Remedy"	Taylor; Justin Smith; Isaac Hayes	Just Blaze	2:57
6.	"Let's Ride"	Taylor; Scott Storch	Storch	3:57
7.	"Too Much" (featuring Nate Dogg)	Taylor; Nathaniel Hale; Storch	Storch	4:11
8.	"Wouldn't Get Far" (featuring Kanye West)	Taylor; Kanye West; Marilyn McLeod; Pam Sawyer	West	4:11
9.	"Scream on 'Em" (featuring Swizz Beatz)	Taylor; Kasseem Dean	Swizz Beatz	4:20
10.	"One Night"	Taylor; Dominick Lamb; Darnell Bristol; Kenneth Edmonds; Sid Johnson	Nottz	4:27
11.	"Doctor's Advocate" (featuring Busta Rhymes)	Taylor; Trevor Smith; Jonathan Reuven Rotem; David Goldsmith; C. Young	J.R. Rotem	5:03
12.	"Ol' English" (featuring Dion)	Taylor; Dion Jenkins; Tony Cottrell	Hi-Tek	4:44
13.	"California Vacation" (featuring Snoop Dogg and Xzibit)	Taylor; Calvin Broadus; Alvin Joiner; Rotem	J.R. Rotem	4:29
14.	"Bang" (featuring Tha Dogg Pound)	Taylor; Delmar Arnaud; Ricardo Brown; David "Jelly Roll" Drew	Jelly Roll	3:37
15.	"Around the World" (featuring Jamie Foxx)	Taylor; Eric Bishop; Denaun Porter; Mike Chavarria; Walter Howard	Mr. Porter; Mike Chav (co.)	4:02
16.	"Why You Hate the Game" (featuring Nas and Marsha Ambrosius)	Taylor; Nasir Jones; Marsha Ambrosius; Smith; Marvin Ambrosius; Norbert Sloley	Just Blaze	9:22

United Kingdom bonus tracks
No.	Title	Producer(s)	Length
17.	"I'm Chillin'" (featuring Fergie)	will.i.am	4:33
18.	"It's Okay (One Blood) (Remix)" (featuring Jim Jones, Snoop Dogg, Nas, T.I., Fat Joe, Lil Wayne, N.O.R.E., Jadakiss, Styles P, Fabolous, Juelz Santana, Rick Ross, Twista, Tha Dogg Pound, WC, E-40, Bun B, Chamillionaire, Slim Thug, Young Dro, Clipse, and Ja Rule)	Reefa	11:47

=== Sample credits ===
- "Da Shit" contains a sample from "Ipecac" written and performed by Zoogz Rift and excerpts from the film Tales from the Hood.
- "It's Okay (One Blood)" contains a sample from "One Blood" performed by Junior Reid.
- "Compton" contains samples from "Real Muthaphuckkin G's" performed by Eazy-E; "Hard Times" performed by Baby Huey; "Gangster Boogie" performed by Chicago Gangsters; "Swahililand" performed by Ahmad Jamal, and "Amen, Brother" performed by The Winstons.
- "Remedy" contains samples from "Hyperbolicsyllabicsesquedalymistic" written and performed by Isaac Hayes, and "Black Steel in the Hour of Chaos" performed by Public Enemy.
- "Let's Ride" contains a sample from "Picture Me Rollin'" performed by 2Pac.
- "Wouldn't Get Far" contains samples from "I'd Find You Anywhere" performed by Creative Source; "Long Red" performed by Mountain and "All Bout U" performed by 2Pac.
- "Scream on 'Em" contains a sample from "Police Station Exploration" performed by Michael Richard Plowman.
- "One Night" contains a sample from "Two Occasions" performed by The Deele.
- "Doctor's Advocate" contains a sample from "Up Against the Wind" performed by Lori Perri from the soundtrack from the film, Set It Off.
- "Ol' English" contains a sample from "(If Loving You is Wrong) I Don't Want to Be Right" performed by Luther Ingram
- "California Vacation" contains a sample from "Funky Worm" performed by Ohio Players.
- "Why You Hate the Game" contains a sample from "With You" performed by The Main Ingredient.
- "I'm Chillin'" contains samples from "Funky Drummer" performed by James Brown, and "You Gots to Chill" performed by EPMD.

=== Instrumentations ===
- Lookin' At You - Keyboards: Ervin "E.P." Pope; Guitars: Glenn Jeffery; Bass: E. Battle; Additional vocals: Mac Minister and Tracey Nelson
- Let's Ride - Guitar: Aaron "Franchise" Fishbein
- Wouldn't Get Far - Additional drum programming by Patrick Gillin
- One Night - Additional vocals: DMP and Andrea Martin
- Doctor's Advocate - Chorus vocal: Samuel Christian
- Ol' English - Bass & guitar: Erick Coomes
- California Vacation - Additional vocals: Tracey Nelson
- Around the World - Keyboards: Walter Howard
- Why You Hate the Game - Choir: The 1500 Choir; Drums & Strings: Just Blaze; Organ & piano: Lamar Edwards and Larrance Dopson; Additional vocals: Andrea Martin

== Personnel ==
Credits for Doctor's Advocate adapted from AllMusic.

- Asif Ali - Assistant Engineer, Engineer
- Wayne Allison - Engineer
- Marsha Ambrosius - Vocals
- Heinrich Boykins "Heimy" - Groomer
- Wendell Cage - Project Coordinator
- Mike Chav - Engineer, Producer
- Kelvin Chu - A&R
- Erik "Baby Jesus" Coomes - Bass, Guitar
- D-Roc - Producer
- Andrew Dawson - Engineer
- K. Dean - Composer
- Mike Dean - Mixing
- Dion - Vocals
- DJ Hi-Tek - Producer
- Tha Dogg Pound - Vocals
- Nate Dogg - Vocals
- Larrance Dopson - Organ (Hammond), Piano
- Dylan Dresdow - Engineer
- D. Drew - Composer
- Lamar Edwards - Organ (Hammond), Piano
- Scott Elgin - Engineer
- 1500 Choir - Choir, Chorus, Vocals
- Aaron Fishbein - Guitar
- Joshua Fisher - Marketing Coordinator
- Andrew Flad - Product Manager
- Jamie Foxx - Vocals
- Nicole Frantz - Creative Assistance
- The Game - Executive Producer
- Conrad Golding - Engineer
- Bernie Grundman - Mastering
- Andy Gwynn - Engineer
- N. Hale - Composer
- Walter Howard - Keyboards
- Chris Jackson - Engineer
- Janeen Jasmine - Composer, Vocals (Background)
- Jellyroll - Producer
- Just Blaze - Drums, Producer, Strings
- Kenneth Keith Kallenbach - A&R
- Padraic Kerin - Engineer
- Anthony Kilhoffer - Engineer
- Marc Lee - Engineer
- Patrick Magee - Assistant Engineer
- Jonathan Mannion - Photography
- Monica Marrow - Wardrobe
- Andrea Martin - Vocals
- Tony Martin - A&R
- Curtis Mayfield - Composer
- Marilyn McLeod - Composer
- Mister Porter - Producer
- Nas - Vocals
- Tracey Nelson - Vocals, Vocals (Background)
- Ervin Pope - Keyboards, Producer
- Oscar Ramirez - Engineer
- Junior Reid - Vocals
- Omar Reyna - Assistant Engineer
- Zoogz Rift - Composer
- Jimmy "Henchmen" Rosemond - Executive Producer
- J.R. Rotem - Composer, Producer
- Angelo Sanders - A&R
- Pam Sawyer - Composer
- Daniel Seeff - Bass, Guitar
- Kelly Sheehen - Engineer
- Shorty - Choir, Chorus
- Norbert Sloley - Composer
- Snoop Dogg - Vocals
- Scott Storch - Producer
- Brian Sumner - Engineer
- Swizz Beatz - Producer, Vocals
- Sean Tallman - Engineer
- Andrew Van Meter - Producer
- David Weldon - Composer
- Kanye West - Producer, Vocals
- Ryan West - Engineer, Mixing
- Don Smartt - Engineer
- will.i.am - Engineer, Mixing, Producer, Vocals
- Ethan Willoughby - Mixing
- Doug Wilson - Mixing
- C. Young - Composer

== Charts ==
=== Weekly charts ===
Chart (2006)	Peak position
Australian Albums (ARIA)	28
Austrian Albums (Ö3 Austria)	46
Belgian Albums (Ultratop Flanders)	80
Belgian Albums (Ultratop Wallonia)	85
Canadian Albums (Billboard)	2
Dutch Albums (Album Top 100)	40
French Albums (SNEP)	27
German Albums (Offizielle Top 100)	29
Irish Albums (IRMA)	8
Italian Albums (FIMI)	67
New Zealand Albums (RMNZ)	15
Norwegian Albums (VG-lista)	24
Scottish Albums (Official Charts)	23
Swiss Albums (Schweizer Hitparade)	15
UK Albums (Official Charts)	21
US Billboard 200	1
US Top R&B/Hip-Hop Albums (Billboard)	1
US Top Rap Albums (Billboard)	1

=== Year-end charts ===
Chart (2007)	Position
US Billboard 200	48
US Top R&B/Hip-Hop Albums (Billboard)	12

== Certifications ==
Region	Certification	Certified units/sales
New Zealand (RMNZ)	Gold	7,500^{^}
United Kingdom (BPI)	Gold	100,000^{^}
^{^} Shipments figures based on certification alone.
