= Legal (song) =

Single by Snow

from the album Two Hands Clapping
- Released: 2002
- Genre: Reggae fusion
- Length: 3:23
- Label: Virgin Music
- Producers: Laney Stewart, Brent Setterington

Snow singles chronology
"Nothin' on Me" (2001)	"Legal" (2002)	"That's My Life" (2003)

"Legal" is a song recorded by Canadian reggae singer Snow. It was released in October 2002 as the first single from his 2002 album, Two Hands Clapping.

== Music video ==
The music video for "Legal" features Trailer Park Boys character Bubbles.

The video begins with a scene between Snow and Bubbles. Snow is repeatedly honking the horn in his car, yelling for Bubbles to come out of his trailer so they can go to a music video shoot. However, Bubbles can't leave yet because he has to take care of his neighbour's cat. Snow, who is already late for the video shoot, leaves without him, much to Bubbles' dismay. An angry Bubbles asks Snow to put his name at the door.

The video then switches to the song and the video shoot. Bubbles arrives at the video shoot, but the security guards refuse to let him in because his name is not on the list. However, Bubbles sneaks his way into the video, pretending he's part of the video shoot by wearing a puffy jacket (dressing up like "Puff Shady" according to Bubbles). Bubbles, unaware that the video shoot is in process, interrupts the video and causes the music to stop. Bubbles complains to Snow about not putting his name on the list, to which a frustrated Snow responds by informing him the video is being filmed. When Bubbles notices the cameras, he demands that the music be put back on and begins to dance with a woman.

== Chart performance ==
=== Weekly charts ===
Weekly chart performance
Chart (2002)	Position
Canada (Nielsen SoundScan)	13
Canada CHR (Nielsen BDS)	11

=== Year-end charts ===
Year-end chart performance
Chart (2002)	Position
Canada (Nielsen SoundScan)	44
