= Let's Ride (The Game song) =

Single by The Game

from the album Doctor's Advocate
- Released: September 25, 2006
- Genre: West Coast hip hop; gangsta rap; g-funk
- Length: 3:57
- Label: Geffen
- Songwriters: Storch, S., Jayceon Taylor
- Producer: Scott Storch

The Game singles chronology
"It's Okay (One Blood)" (2006)	"Let's Ride" (2006)	"Wouldn't Get Far" (2007)

Music video
- "Let's Ride" on YouTube

"Let's Ride" is a song performed by rapper The Game for his second album, Doctor's Advocate (2006). The song, written by The Game and Scott Storch, was released as the album's second single in the US on September 25, 2006, and in the UK on January 8, 2007. The Game mentioned on radio station KDAY in Los Angeles, California that the track was recorded in Miami, Florida, but had the feel of a West Coast Dr. Dre record. The song peaked at number 46 on the Billboard Hot 100 chart. "Let's Ride" heavily references the 1993 single "Let Me Ride" by rapper Dr. Dre.

== Reception ==
"Let's Ride" received mediocre reviews from music critics. MusicOMH wrote that the track "lacks in any of the vigour and enthusiasm that came with his debut major release album". Pitchfork gave the song a negative review saying, "What an embarrassment this song turned out to be, lumberingly obvious and poorly crafted from the first awkward gang reference to the last Dre namedrop." About.com's Henry Adaso called the track "just another boring mantra devoid of substance" with The Game delivering "a lethargic sprawl, replete with 50 Cent-esque crooning and tautological Dre odes ("Ain't nuthin' but a G thang, baby, it's a G thang")." Entertainment Weekly, in a review of Doctor's Advocate, wrote that the song "recycle[s] Dre's signature high-pitched synths and plinking pianos" and is "marred by stale rhymes chronicling cartoonish gangbanging." Chocolate magazine said the track "lacks charisma and substance, and is filled with 50 Cent-style tuneless crooning, endless name checks for Aftermath, Eminem and Dr. Dre and empty lyrics". There is also an unofficial remix for this song featuring Ice Cube, Snoop Dogg and Xzibit.

== Music video ==
The music video premiered on Black Entertainment Television's 106 & Park on October 23, 2006, as a "new joint". On November 14, 2006, the video debuted on MTV's Total Request Live at #10 and stayed on the chart for well over 16 days. The Game is seen riding in a 1964 Chevrolet Impala with hydraulics and contains a cameo appearance by fellow West Coast rapper Snoop Dogg. The video was also the subject of an MTV Making the Video episode like his previous single, "Dreams".

== Track listing ==
Side A

1. "Let's Ride" (clean) – 3:53
2. "Let's Ride" (dirty) – 3:53
3. "Let's Ride" (instrumental) – 3:53
4. "Let's Ride" (acappella) – 3:53

Side B

1. "Let's Ride" (clean) – 3:53
2. "Let's Ride" (dirty) – 3:53
3. "Let's Ride" (instrumental) – 3:53
4. "Let's Ride" (a cappella) – 3:53

== Charts ==
=== Weekly charts ===
Chart (2006–2007)	Peak position
Australia (ARIA)	75
Finland (Suomen virallinen lista)	12
Germany (Media Control AG)	74
Ireland (IRMA)	36
Netherlands (Dutch Top 40 Tipparade)	6
Netherlands (Single Top 100)	97
New Zealand (Recorded Music NZ)	17
Scottish Singles Sales (Official Charts)	51
Switzerland (Schweizer Hitparade)	79
UK Singles (Official Charts)	42
UK Hip Hop/R&B (Official Charts)	4
US Billboard Hot 100	46
US Hot R&B/Hip-Hop Songs (Billboard)	55
US Hot Rap Songs (Billboard)	14
US Rhythmic Airplay (Billboard)	23

=== Year-end charts ===
Chart (2007)	Position
UK Urban (Music Week)	28

== Certifications ==
Region	Certification	Certified units/sales
New Zealand (RMNZ)	Gold	15,000^{‡}
^{‡} Sales+streaming figures based on certification alone.
