= 12 Inches of Snow =

Studio album by Snow
- Released: January 19, 1993
- Recorded: 1992
- Studios: Bayside Sound, New York, NY
- Genres: Pop; reggae
- Length: 55:39
- Label: East West
- Producers: MC Shan; Edmond Leary; John Ficarrotta

Snow chronology
| Assaulted (1991) | 12 Inches of Snow (1993) | Murder Love (1995) |

Singles from 12 Inches of Snow
- 1. "Informer" Released: August 1992; 2. "Girl I've Been Hurt" Released: April 15, 1993

Professional ratings
Review scores
| Source | Rating |
|---|---|
| AllMusic | 2.5/5 stars |
| Entertainment Weekly | B− |
| Los Angeles Times | 3/4 stars |
| Music Week | 3/5 stars |
| NME | 5/10 |
| Orlando Sentinel | 2/3 stars |
| Rolling Stone | 3/5 stars |
| Select | 3/5 medals |

12 Inches of Snow is the debut studio album by Canadian reggae musician Snow, released on January 19th, 1993, through East West Records. Edmond Leary and MC Shan produced the entire album, apart from one track which was produced by John Ficarrotta. The album was produced shortly before Snow was imprisoned for a year on an assault charge. Upon his release from prison, his first single "Informer" became a chart topping hit.

== Production ==
The album 12 Inches of Snow originated after Snow auditioned for MC Shan in 1991; Shan was so impressed by Snow that he invited him to begin recording in his pre-production studio in his basement. Shan introduced Snow to managers Steve Salem and David Eng, who immediately signed Snow and created "Moto Jam Records". Salem and Eng also became executive producers for the album, which Snow recorded in their Bay Sound Recording Studio. The inspiration for the song "Informer" stemmed from a late night incident across the street from Snow's Allenbury home. Thus, the song describes how a detective incorrectly accused Snow of "stabbing someone down the lane", also chronicling Snow's incarceration at Toronto East Detention Centre and imprisonment.

Shan described the album as not "raw, straight-up" reggae but more of a hybrid album fusing pop, jazz, reggae, and hip hop resulting in "mass appeal." Indeed, the songs "Informer", "Runway", "Champion Sound", and "Lonely Monday Morning", were dancehall tracks performed in Jamaican Patois. Shan recorded "Drunken Styles", another song performed entirely in patois, after Snow and the recording crew celebrated at a nearby tavern in Bayside Queens after a studio session whereas a tipsy Snow performed the entire track free style.

Other songs, such as "Lady With the Red Dress", "Girl I've Been Hurt", "Uhh in You", and "Hey, Pretty Love", mixed love ballads and dance tracks with patois. "Ease Up", "Creative Child", and "50 Ways (To Flip a Style)", were hip-hop inspired songs.

=== Legal dispute ===
While touring as Snow's DJ in December 1994, Marvin Prince abruptly left the tour after discovering Snow "was receiving more money from management than he was." While listed as only the co-writer of the song "Runway" on the 12 Inches of Snow album, Prince claimed to have co-written five songs and co-produced the album with Shan, Eng, and Salem. Furthermore, Prince alleged that Eng and Salem provided "a draft of a multi-album production and recording agreement" for both Snow and himself. Unable to understand the contract, Prince allegedly "sent a copy to his mother to get legal advice from her friend" and "never saw the agreement again." Moreover, Prince claimed to have entered an "oral agreement" with Snow implying that the two would equally share profits from the album. The first agreement, Prince alleged, occurred "in 1990, when the two men began working together on songs in" Prince's "basement" and he "allegedly suggested to" Snow, "if something comes out of this, let's be partners." The second oral agreement, according to Prince, took place in August 1991 while Snow "auditioned for Shan." While Snow frequently referred to Prince as his partner in promotional videos, he claimed to have used the term "only in the slang sense." Prince, moreover, "admitted that these discussions were not concrete; the parties never organized a formal business plan, nor was plaintiff in New York to advance defendant's career."

Shan, Eng, and Salem, testified that they were unaware of a partnership between Snow and Prince and Shan denied that Prince co-produced 12 Inches of Snow and co-wrote five of the songs on the album. While initially winning a $1.5 million judgment, the court dismissed Prince's suit on grounds that he had "no viable claims" to a partnership with Snow.

== Release ==
East-West released the first single, "Informer," while Snow was serving time in prison for assault charges. In fact, Snow first watched the "Informer" video while behind bars. Upon his release, a limousine picked him up and he left prison as a recording star. "Informer" went on to become one of the biggest international hits of 1993 and 12 Inches of Snow became one of the top-selling albums of that year. The album was certified platinum by the RIAA with an excess of 1 million copies sold and in Canada was certified triple platinum by the CRIA.

== Track listing ==
All tracks are written by Darrin O'Brien, Shawn Moltke and Edmond Leary, except where noted.

| No. | Title | Writer(s) | Producer(s) | Length |
|---|---|---|---|---|
| 1. | "Runway" | Darrin O'Brien, Marvin Prince | MC Shan, John Ficarrotta*, Edmond Leary* | 4:27 |
| 2. | "Champion Sound" | | MC Shan, Ficarrotta*, Leary* | 4:00 |
| 3. | "Lonely Monday Morning" | | MC Shan, Ficarrotta*, Leary* | 4:44 |
| 4. | "Drunken Styles" | | MC Shan, Ficarrotta*, Leary* | 4:04 |
| 5. | "Girl I've Been Hurt" | | MC Shan, Ficarrotta*, Leary* | 4:12 |
| 6. | "Hey Pretty Love" | | MC Shan, Ficarrotta*, Leary* | 4:24 |
| 7. | "Informer" | | MC Shan, Ficarrotta*, Leary*, Moltke, Terri* | 4:28 |
| 8. | "Creative Child" | | MC Shan, Ficarrotta*, Leary* | 3:17 |
| 9. | "Lady with the Red Dress" | | MC Shan, Ficarrotta*, Leary* | 3:25 |
| 10. | "Uhh in You" | Ficarrotta, O'Brien | Ficarrotta, MC Shan*, Leary* | 3:46 |
| 11. | "Can't Get Enough" | | MC Shan, Ficarrotta*, Leary* | 3:51 |
| 12. | "Ease Up" | | MC Shan, Ficarrotta*, Leary* | 4:51 |
| 13. | "50 Ways" (CD bonus track) | | MC Shan, Ficarrotta*, Leary* | 3:40 |
| 14. | "Lonely Monday Morning (Remix)" (CD bonus track) | | MC Shan, Ficarrotta*, Leary* | 4:21 |

- (*) Denotes co-producer.

== Personnel ==
Adapted credits from the media notes of 12 Inches of Snow.

- EZ Steve Salem, David Eng: executive producers
- John Ficarrotta: mixing, engineering (Bayside Sound Recording Studios, NY)
- Mike Tuosto: additional engineering
- DJ Prince: additional vocals ("Drunken Styles"), beats and bass ("Runway")
- MC Shan: additional rap vocals ("Informer", "50 Ways")
- Terri Moltke Tucker: writer additional rap ("Informer"), composer and arrangement
- Ronaldo da Silva: guitar ("Hey Pretty Love")
- Jerome Sydenham: musical direction ("Lonely Monday Morning")
- Rick "The Mexican" Huerta: editing
- Tony Dawsey: mastering (Masterdisk)
- Melanie Nissen: photography and art direction
- Lynn Kowalewski: design

== Charts ==
=== Weekly charts ===
| Chart (1993) | Peak position |
|---|---|
| Australian Albums (ARIA) | 27 |
| Austrian Albums (Ö3 Austria) | 7 |
| Canada Top Albums/CDs (RPM) | 3 |
| Dutch Albums (Album Top 100) | 8 |
| German Albums (Offizielle Top 100) | 5 |
| Hungarian Albums (MAHASZ) | 17 |
| New Zealand Albums (RMNZ) | 31 |
| Norwegian Albums (VG-lista) | 9 |
| Swedish Albums (Sverigetopplistan) | 20 |
| Swiss Albums (Schweizer Hitparade) | 10 |
| UK Albums (Official Charts) | 41 |
| US Billboard 200 | 5 |
| US Top R&B/Hip-Hop Albums (Billboard) | 12 |

=== Year-end charts ===
| Chart (1993) | Position |
|---|---|
| Canada Top Albums/CDs (RPM) | 12 |
| German Albums (Offizielle Top 100) | 57 |
| US Billboard 200 | 41 |
| US Top R&B/Hip-Hop Albums (Billboard) | 39 |

== Certifications ==
| Region | Certification | Certified units/sales |
|---|---|---|
| Canada (Music Canada) | 3× Platinum | 300,000^{^} |
| Japan (RIAJ) | Platinum | 200,000^{^} |
| United States (RIAA) | Platinum | 1,000,000^{^} |
^{^} Shipments figures based on certification alone.
