= Cooler Conditions =

Studio album by Snow
- Released: September 13, 1999
- Recorded: 1998–1999
- Genres: Reggae fusion; hip-hop
- Label: JVC
- Producers: MC Shan; Snow

Snow chronology
Justuss (1997)	Cooler Conditions (1999)	Mind on the Moon (2000)

Cooler Conditions is the fourth studio album by Canadian reggae musician Snow. Released only in Japan, many of the tracks later appeared on the more widely released Mind on the Moon album. The tracks Someday Somehow, "Everybody Wants to Be Like You", Jimmy Hat and The Plumb Song were remixed and recorded again for the Mind on the Moon release.

== Production ==
In 1998, Snow began working with a new manager, Paula Danyelvich of Hype Music, and reunited with producer MC Shan. By March 1999, Snow signed a contract with JVC Japan to release a 12-track album in Japan and Asia. Recorded in Toronto, Boston, and Nashville, Snow teamed up with producer/engineer Glen Rosenstein to produce a much softer, pop-based sound as compared to his edgier dancehall tracks from his previous albums. Shan told Billboard Magazine, "He's still Snow [and the music] still has the reggae touch, but we've gone into different musical areas as well."

In addition to Shan appearing on the tracks Jimmy Hat and Informer '99, Michee Mee performed on Maybe I'm Lonely. Snow, a long time Kiss fan, also recorded a cover of "I Love it Loud" and a reggae version of Kansas' "Dust in The Wind" (Hard Life).

== Reception ==
After Snow signed with Virgin music, many of the songs were remixed and released on Snow's 2000 album, Mind on the Moon. In 2001, the video for The Plumb Song was nominated for MuchMusic Video of the year

== Track listing ==
1. "Someday Somehow"
2. "Everybody Wants to Be Like You"
3. "Drunk Man's Theory"
4. "Jimmy Hat" (featuring MC Shan)
5. "Hard Life"
6. "You Can Do Anything"
7. "Loud"
8. "Come Down"
9. "Maybe I'm Lonely" (featuring Michee Mee)
10. "Informer 99" (featuring MC Shan)
11. "The Plumb Song"
