= Informer (song) =

1992 single by Snow

Single by Snow

from the album 12 Inches of Snow
- Released: August 1992
- Genre: Reggae fusion; hip hop; dancehall
- Length: 4:28
- Label: EastWest America; Motor Jam
- Songwriters: Edmond Leary; Darrin O'Brien; Shawn Moltke; Terri Moltke; Jeffrey Silva (associate writer)
- Producer: MC Shan

Snow singles chronology
| "Informer" (1992) | "Girl I've Been Hurt" (1992) |

Music video
- "Informer" on YouTube

"Informer" is a song by Canadian reggae musician Snow, released in August 1992 by EastWest America and Motor Jam Records as the first single from his debut album, 12 Inches of Snow (1993). The song is well known for the line "a licky boom boom down" and for Snow's fast toasting and often unintelligible lyrics.

Produced by MC Shan, who also contributed a rap verse, "Informer" was a chart-topping hit, spending seven consecutive weeks at number one on the US Billboard Hot 100 and reaching number one in 11 other countries. "Informer" is Snow's biggest hit in the United Kingdom, where it peaked at number two on the UK Singles Chart. Its music video was directed by George Seminara, featuring Snow in jail. In 2007, "Informer" was ranked number 84 on VH1's "100 Greatest Songs of the 90s". Conversely, the song was included in Pitchfork's 2010 list of "The Seven Worst U.S. Number One Singles of the 90s".

In 2019, Puerto Rican singer, songwriter, and rapper Daddy Yankee released a new version of "Informer" as "Con Calma" together with Snow, who recorded new parts. The Spanish-language remake topped the charts of 20 countries and reached the top 10 of 10 others.

== Background and content ==
Snow grew up as Darrin O'Brien in Toronto, Canada. He was raised on classic rock, but after Jamaicans moved into his neighborhood, due to then-Prime Minister Pierre Trudeau's revised immigration policies, reggae became a huge part of his life.

"That's a jail song. It's not, 'Baby, I love you.' I wrote that song in jail about informers. But people didn't know what I was singing."

— Snow talking about the song.

In 1992, while on vacation in Queens, New York, Snow met American rapper and record producer MC Shan, and they produced a four-song demo. MC Shan then introduced Snow to producer–managers Steve Salem and David Eng, who signed him to their Motor Jam Records company, and licensed the music to East West Records. Shortly thereafter, Snow began serving an eight-month sentence in Toronto for assault. "Informer" began getting radio and MuchMusic airplay while he was incarcerated.

The song is based on a separate 1989 incident when Snow was charged with two counts of attempted murder. At the time, he was detained for a year in Toronto before the charges were reduced to aggravated assault, and he was eventually acquitted and freed. In a 1999 interview, he referred to his criminal history as "a couple of bar fights."

== Critical reception ==
AllMusic editor Ron Wynn called the song "patois-laced", noting further that it "shattered the myth that pop audiences wouldn't embrace any tune whose lyrics weren't in pristine English; when his video was released, it included a rolling translation at the bottom." M.R. Martinez from Cash Box felt it demonstrated Snow's "unique delivery which sounds less imitative than some dancehallers or rappers from the bonafide hood." Havelock Nelson from Entertainment Weekly declared the song as "slippery and tuneful". Swedish Expressen described it as "hard-boiled Jamaican crime fiction". Katrine Ring from Danish Gaffa named it an "excellent pop-number". Dennis Hunt from Los Angeles Times felt "he adds a nifty dimension to dancehall by smoothly integrating pop textures." In his weekly UK chart commentary, James Masterton concluded that it "must surely be a contender for No.1 within a week or two."

Alan Jones from Music Week complimented "this infectious, instantly appealing dancehall" song for achieving "the right mix between reggae and hip-hop." He added that it "should make quite a splash here." Cermak and Ross from The Network Forty commented, "You'd swear you were listening to a Jamaican straight out of Kingston, but this 22-year-old white male hails from Toronto's ghetto. Along with mixer DJ Prince and record producer and rapper MC Shan, Snow creates a hooky low-groover with infectious dancehall toasting." Jan DeKnock from Orlando Sentinel labeled it as "dancable". People Magazine noted that Snow's "incarcerations flavor the pumped up, hip-hop-infused single". James Hamilton from the Record Mirror Dance Update called it both "excellent" and "jaunty" in his weekly dance column. Parry Gettelman from The Sentinel named "Informer" one of two "best tracks" of the album, remarking that it "pair powerful rhythms with killer choruses - hear "Informer" once and just try to get it out of your head."

== Chart performance ==
"Informer" peaked at number one on the singles chart in Denmark, Finland, Germany, Ireland, Mexico, Norway, Sweden and Switzerland, as well as on the Eurochart Hot 100. It entered the top 10 in Austria, France, Greece, Iceland, Italy, the Netherlands, Portugal, Spain, and the United Kingdom. In the latter country, the single peaked at number two during its third week at the UK Singles Chart, on March 21, 1993. Outside Europe, it reached number one in Australia, New Zealand, Zimbabwe, and on the US Billboard Hot 100. In Snow's native Canada, "Informer" topped The Record's singles chart and was a top-10 radio hit, peaking at number nine on the RPM 100 Hit Tracks chart. In West Asia, the song became a top-five hit in Israel, peaking at number two on April 13, 1993.

"Informer" was awarded with a gold record in Austria and the Netherlands, a silver record in the UK, and a platinum record in Germany, New Zealand and the US. In Australia, it received a double-platinum record.

== Music video ==
Directed by George Seminara, the accompanying music video for the song shows Snow entering a jail cell. His producer and friend, MC Shan, is also featured in the video; he explains how he got into prison by not turning informer. DJ Marvin Prince is seen enjoying a sauna with a couple of women. There are bikini clad women throughout and Snow is accompanied by female dancers glossed in black and white. When first shown, the video had no subtitles, but they were added because few people could comprehend what Snow was saying. Later, "Informer" was made available on YouTube in 4K remaster in 2019 and had generated more than 62 million views as of late 2025.

== Awards and recognition ==
"Informer" won a Juno Award for Best Reggae Recording in 1994. In 2007, the song was ranked number 84 on VH1's "100 Greatest Songs of the 90s". In 2020, Cleveland.com ranked it at number 127 on their list of the best Billboard Hot 100 No. 1 song of the 1990s.

== Legacy ==
Many reggae purists viewed the song, along with the works of Ini Kamoze, Diana King, Shaggy and Shabba Ranks, as another example of "watered down" commercial reggae that rose to international popularity in the 1990s. The song was parodied on an episode of In Living Color where fellow Toronto native Jim Carrey portrays Snow and satirizes a white man singing reggae as well as radio stations playing a song targeted towards police officers. The song was later re-imagined into Daddy Yankee's hit single "Con Calma", which was released in 2019.

== Censorship ==
Due to strict regulatory standards imposed by Ofcom, the song was subjected to heavy censorship by MTV 90s, which garbled every instance of “stabbed”, as well as a cavity search reference.

== Track listings ==
- CD maxi
1. "Informer" (radio mix) – 4:11
2. "Informer" (album mix Rick the Mexican remix edit) – 4:28
3. "Informer" (drum mix) – 4:12
4. "Informer" (Clark's Fat Bass mix) – 4:39
5. "Informer" (Clark's Super mix) – 4:51
- 7-inch single
1. "Informer" (radio edit) – 4:05
2. "Informer" (album mix Rick the Mexican remix edit) – 4:28
- 12-inch maxi
1. "Informer" (LP version Rick the Mexican remix edit) – 4:28
2. "Informer" (drum mix) – 4:12
3. "Informer" (dub) – 4:12
4. "Informer" (Clark's Fat Bass mix) – 4:39
5. "Informer" (Clark's Super radio mix) – 4:11
6. "Informer" (super dub) – 4:50
- Cassette
1. "Informer" (LP version Rick the Mexican remix edit) – 4:30
2. "Informer" (drum mix) – 4:13

== Personnel ==
- Text: Darrin O'Brien, Edmund Leary, Shawn Moltke
- Producer: MC Shan
- Executive producer: David Eng, EZ Steve Salem
- Co-producer: Edmund Leary, John "Jumpstreet" Ficarotta
- Photography: Melanie Nissen
- Informer remixer and editor: Rick the Mexican Huerta

== Charts ==
=== Weekly charts ===
Weekly chart performance for "Informer"
| Chart (1992–1993) | Peak position |
|---|---|
| Australia (ARIA) | 1 |
| Austria (Ö3 Austria Top 40) | 2 |
| Belgium (Ultratop 50 Flanders) | 2 |
| Canada Retail Singles (The Record) | 1 |
| Canada Top Singles (RPM) | 9 |
| Canada Dance/Urban (RPM) | 5 |
| Denmark (IFPI) | 1 |
| Europe (Eurochart Hot 100) | 1 |
| Europe (European Dance Radio) | 3 |
| Europe (European Hit Radio) | 1 |
| Finland (Suomen virallinen lista) | 1 |
| France (SNEP) | 3 |
| Germany (GfK) | 1 |
| Greece (Pop + Rock) | 6 |
| Iceland (Íslenski Listinn Topp 40) | 8 |
| Ireland (IRMA) | 1 |
| Israel (Israeli Singles Chart) | 2 |
| Italy (Musica e dischi) | 8 |
| Mexico (AMPROFON) | 1 |
| Netherlands (Dutch Top 40) | 2 |
| Netherlands (Single Top 100) | 2 |
| New Zealand (Recorded Music NZ) | 1 |
| Norway (VG-lista) | 1 |
| Portugal (AFP) | 7 |
| Spain (AFYVE) | 3 |
| Sweden (Sverigetopplistan) | 1 |
| Switzerland (Schweizer Hitparade) | 1 |
| UK Singles (Official Charts) | 2 |
| UK Airplay (Music Week) | 8 |
| UK Dance (Music Week) | 7 |
| US Billboard Hot 100 | 1 |
| US Dance Club Songs (Billboard) | 24 |
| US Dance Singles Sales (Billboard) | 1 |
| US Hot R&B/Hip-Hop Songs (Billboard) | 10 |
| US Hot Rap Songs (Billboard) | 1 |
| US Pop Airplay (Billboard) | 12 |
| US Rhythmic Airplay (Billboard) | 5 |
| US Cash Box Top 100 | 1 |
| Zimbabwe (ZIMA) | 1 |

=== Year-end charts ===
Year-end chart performance for "Informer"
| Chart (1993) | Position |
|---|---|
| Australia (ARIA) | 6 |
| Austria (Ö3 Austria Top 40) | 9 |
| Belgium (Ultratop) | 27 |
| Canada Top Singles (RPM) | 86 |
| Canada Dance/Urban (RPM) | 45 |
| Europe (Eurochart Hot 100) | 5 |
| Europe (European Hit Radio) | 26 |
| Germany (Media Control) | 6 |
| Iceland (Íslenski Listinn Topp 40) | 37 |
| Israel (Israeli Singles Chart) | 34 |
| Netherlands (Dutch Top 40) | 11 |
| Netherlands (Single Top 100) | 12 |
| New Zealand (RIANZ) | 3 |
| Sweden (Topplistan) | 9 |
| Switzerland (Schweizer Hitparade) | 14 |
| UK Singles (OCC) | 17 |
| US Billboard Hot 100 | 10 |
| US Hot R&B Singles (Billboard) | 67 |
| US Maxi-Singles Sales (Billboard) | 11 |
| US Cash Box Top 100 | 9 |

=== Decade-end charts ===
Decade-end chart performance for "Informer"
| Chart (1990–1999) | Position |
|---|---|
| Canada (Nielsen SoundScan) | 87 |
| US Billboard Hot 100 | 28 |

== Certifications ==
Certifications and sales for "Informer"
| Region | Certification | Certified units/sales |
|---|---|---|
| Australia (ARIA) | 2× Platinum | 140,000^{^} |
| Austria (IFPI Austria) | Gold | 25,000^{*} |
| Germany (BVMI) | Platinum | 500,000^{^} |
| Netherlands (NVPI) | Gold | 50,000^{^} |
| New Zealand (RMNZ) | Platinum | 10,000^{*} |
| United Kingdom (BPI) | Silver | 200,000^{^} |
| United States (RIAA) | Platinum | 1,300,000 |
^{*} Sales figures based on certification alone.^{^} Shipments figures based on certification alone.

== Release history ==
Release dates and formats for "Informer"
| Region | Date | Format(s) | Label(s) | Ref. |
|---|---|---|---|---|
| United States | August 1992 | 7-inch vinyl; 12-inch vinyl; cassette | EastWest America; Motor Jam | |
| United Kingdom | March 1, 1993 | 7-inch vinyl; 12-inch vinyl; CD; cassette | EastWest America; Motor Jam | |
| Australia | March 28, 1993 | CD; cassette | EastWest America; Motor Jam | |
| Japan | July 25, 1993 | Mini-CD | EastWest America; Motor Jam | |
