= Terror Fabulous =

Jamaican dancehall deejay

- Also known as: Terro Fabulous
- Born: Cecil Campbell
- Origin: Jamaica
- Genres: Dancehall
- Occupation: Deejay
- Years active: Early 1990s–present
- Labels: VP; East West; Greensleeves
- Website: www.instagram.com/therealterrorfabulous

Cecil Campbell, known professionally as Terror Fabulous, is a Jamaican dancehall deejay, who had success in the 1990s.

== Biography ==
Campbell was introduced to producer Dave Kelly after completing a course in electrical engineering. His recording career began in the early 1990s, with singles such as "Gwaney Gwaney" and "Dorothy", and he was signed by East West Records. After his debut album, the Patrick Roberts/Donovan Germain-produced Gwaney Gwaney in 1992, his album Yaga Yaga, produced by Kelly and released in 1994, included his hit duet with Nadine Sutherland on "Action" (a number 43 hit in the US, which was also included by Vibe at number nineteen in its list of the fifty greatest duets of all time), as well as "Miss Goody Goody" (with Maxi Priest). Other guests on the album included Brian & Tony Gold, Gary Minott, Daddy Screw, and Wayne Wonder. In the same year, the Bobby Digital-produced Terror was released, and he performed at Reggae Sunsplash. He released a further album in 1996, but this proved to be his last to date, although he made guest appearances on recordings by En Vogue ("Desire"), Luciano ("In This Together"), and Third World ("Legal").

After several years away from the spotlight, he returned in 2005 with a performance at the Portmore Awards show. He currently resides in Bridgeview, Portmore, St. Catherine, Jamaica, where he lives a quiet comfortable life.

== Discography ==
- Gwaney Gwaney (1992), Jet Star/VP
- Yaga Yaga (1994), East West/Atlantic
- Terror (1994), VP
- Lyrically Rough (1996), Greensleeves

Live albums

- Pipper Promotions Presents Mad House Crew Live, Pipper - with Louie Culture & Daddy Screw
