= Nadine Sutherland =

Jamaican musician

Nadine Sutherland OD
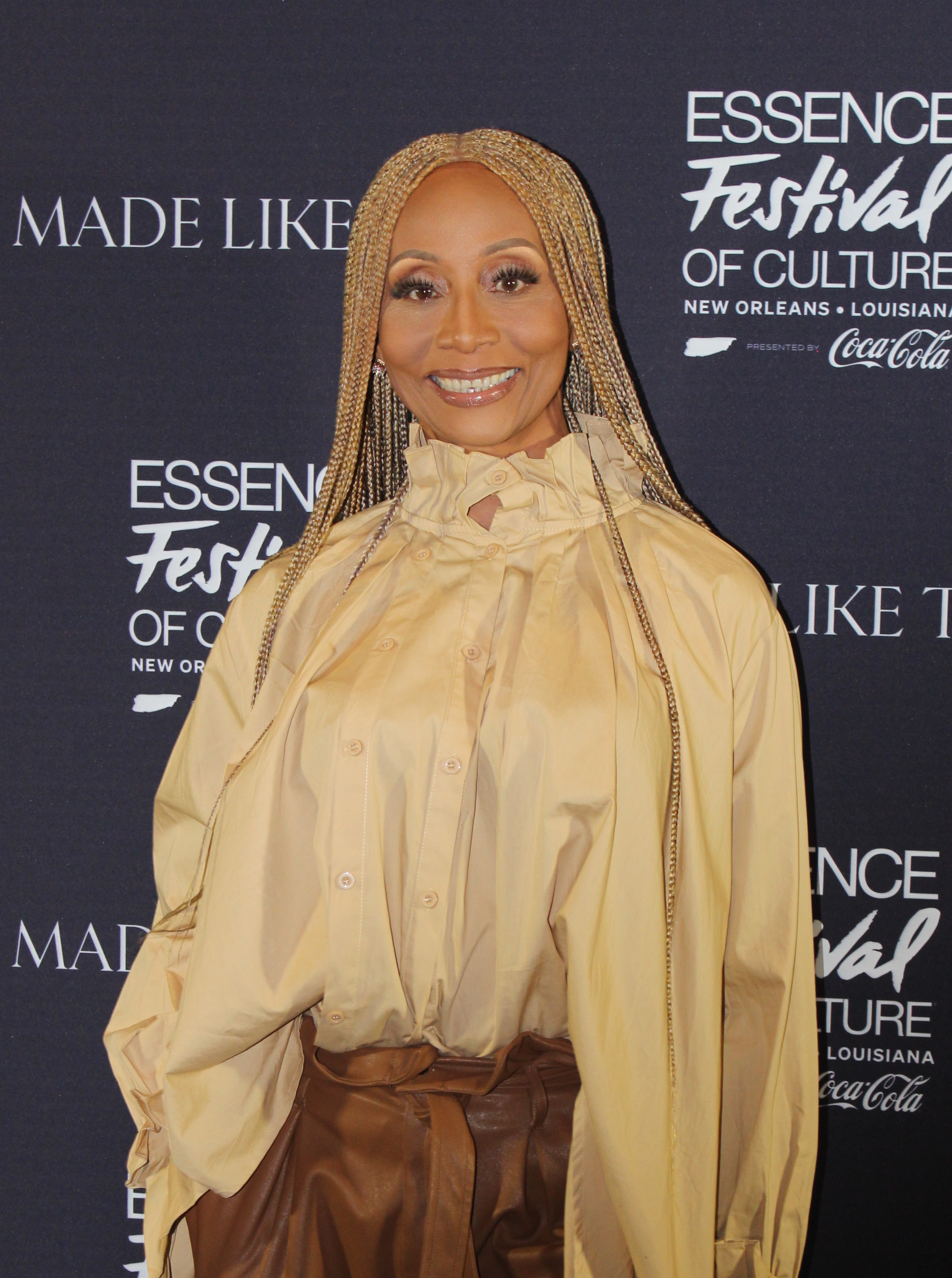
- Sutherland at Essence Festival of Culture July 2025.

Background information
- Born: 15 March 1968 (age 57); Kingston, Jamaica
- Genres: Reggae; dancehall
- Occupations: Vocalist; songwriter
- Years active: 1979–present
- Labels: Tuff Gong; VP; Eight76

Nadine Simone Theresa Sutherland OD (born 15 March 1968) is a Jamaican reggae singer whose early career was nurtured by Bob Marley. She went on to become a successful dancehall artist in the 1990s.

== Biography ==
Sutherland was born in Kingston, Jamaica and raised in Above Rocks in Saint Catherine Parish. She began performing in 1979, winning the Tastee Talent Contest that year (beating Paul Blake and Yellowman), with her parents managing her career while she studied at St Andrew High School. She combined her musical career with studies in business administration, and was the first artist signed by Bob Marley to his Tuff Gong label, recording "Starvation on the Land" while aged eleven. In addition to that, she also recorded a few more Christian reggae singles, such as "Hands and Heart", "A Young One Like Me" and "Work and Pray" when she was associated by her old friends, Anthony "Sangie" Davis and Rita Marley. None of her early reggae singles from the early 1980s reached the Billboard Hot 100. After Marley's death, Sutherland performed at memorial concerts outside Jamaica, along with Ziggy Marley and the Melody Makers, the I Threes, and the Wailers.

She struggled to break through as a solo artist and after touring the US as support to Bunny Wailer, she worked as a backing vocalist at Gussie Clarke's Music Works studio. She went on to work for Donovan Germain at his Penthouse Studios. Dave Kelly produced her 1993 hit "Action", a combination with Terror Fabulous. The track was used by the Jamaican Labour Party as their election campaign theme, and in 2007 was included by Vibe at number nineteen in its list of the fifty greatest duets of all time. In the US, "Action" reached number 43 on the Billboard Hot 100. Buju Banton's "Dickie" was remixed as "Wicked Dickie" with Sutherland adding vocals, and this topped the charts in Jamaica. She collaborated with Banton again on the single "What Am I Gonna Do".

In 2006 she performed at Reggae Sunsplash, and in 2007 she released the album Call My Name, which was a hit in Jamaica as well as on reggae charts in Florida and New York. At the Canadian Reggae Music Awards in 2008, the album was nominated in the 'Top Reggae CD/Album (International)' category, while a single from the album, "Big Tingz", was nominated as 'Best Reggae Single (International)'.

In 2015 she completed a master's degree in cultural studies at the University of the West Indies, and recorded with Mad Professor, with an album planned.

In September 2020, Nadine recorded a dubplate special of her 1993 hit "Action" (originally with Terror Fabulous) for US vice-presidential candidate Kamala Harris, featuring the lyrics "Action, not a bag a mouth. She clean, when she step inna the White House".

Sutherland has also appeared as a judge on the TV show Digicel Rising Stars, written for the Jamaica Observer, and been a committee member for the charity Sisters to Sisters.

== Discography ==
- Nadine Until (1985)
- Nadine (1997), Xterminator/VP
- Call My Name (2007), Eight76 – Billboard Top Reggae Albums No. 11
