= Ninjaman =

- Also known as: Don Gorgon, Brother Desmond
- Born: Desmond John Ballentine; 24 January 1966 (age 60)
- Origin: Saint Mary Parish, Jamaica
- Genres: Reggae, dancehall
- Occupation: Deejay
- Instrument: Vocals

Desmond John Ballentine (born 24 January 1966), better known as Ninjaman, and sometimes as Don Gorgon is a Jamaican dancehall deejay, known for his controversial, pro-gun lyrics, his stuttering and melodramatic style. In 2017, he received a life sentence for murder.

== Biography ==
Born in Annotto Bay, Jamaica, Ballentine moved to Kingston at the age of 12. He launched his deejay career with the Black Culture Sound System at age 14 as "Double Ugly". In 1980, he joined the Killamanjaro sound system, where he got the chance to learn from established deejays Super Cat and Early B, and released his debut single as "Uglyman". Yet another name change made him the now, well-known Ninjaman. In 1987, Ninjaman recorded and produced his first hit single "Protection", a duet with Courtney Melody. The following years brought collaborations with producers including King Jammy, Lloyd "Pickout" Dennis, Witty, Xterminator, Philip "Fatis" Burrell, Redman, Ini Kamoze, Bobby Digital, Augustus "Gussie" Clarke, and Steely & Clevie and Henry "Junjo" Lawes. It has been said that Ninjaman comes up with all of his lyrics on the spot in the recording studio, in a freestyle manner.

His hits over the years from 1989 to 1992, such as "Border Clash," "Murder Dem", "Permit to Bury" and "Above the Law" reinforced Ninjaman's image of a violent rude boy. His rivalries with Flourgon, Super Cat and Shabba Ranks, lead to a number of clashes.

In 1993, criticism of Ninjaman's violent and pro-gun lyrics arose, leading to a decline in performing gigs and chances to record.

By 1997, Ninjaman had changed his name once again, now performing gospel reggae songs as "Brother Desmond". He sought help to fight his crack cocaine addiction in born again Christianity.

In 1999, he was cast in Third World Cop, a Jamaican action crime film directed by Chris Browne and starring Paul Campbell. It was produced by Chris Blackwell of Island Jamaica Films. It became the highest-grossing Jamaican film.

Other movies he was cast in include Rude Boy: The Jamaican Don (2003) and Gangsta's Paradise (2004).

In March 2009, Ninjaman, along with his son Janiel, was arrested and charged in connection with a murder of Ricardo Johnson on Marl Road, Kingston, Jamaica. He was granted bail for the sum of JD$2,000,000 in March 2012, and was scheduled to appear in court 15 July 2012. At least 58 jurors were needed for the start of the trial but only 15 showed up. The trial was rescheduled to start in April 2015, but was again postponed and rescheduled to start in January 2016.

In 2015 he parted ways with Downsound Records and opened his own Picture Frame Studio on Blackwood Terrace in Kingston.

On 20 November 2017, Ninjaman and his co-accused were found guilty of the 2009 murder of Ricardo Johnson. On 18 December 2017, Ballentine was sentenced to life in prison, with the possibility of parole after 25 years.

== Personal life ==
Desmond "Ninjaman" Ballentine is reported to have fathered just over 30 children, according to character‐witness testimony given by Delroy McDowell during his sentencing hearing in the Supreme Court of Jamaica on 18–19 December 2017. In 2022, Ballentine's confidante Stacey Scarlett Bryan (aka Stacious) claimed that he had 33 children with 32 different women.

== Discography ==
- Number One
- Glad Me Release (1986)
- Send Threat To Me (1988)
- Slackness Done (1988)
- Stumbling Block/Sixteen (1988)
- Superstar (1988)
- Big Showdown (1990)
- Border Clash (1990)
- Kill Them And Done (1990)
- Murder Dem (1990)
- My Weapon (1990)
- Out Pon Bail (1990)
- The Last Of Flourgan (1990)
- Warning You Now (1990)
- Zig It Up (1990)
- Bring Them All To Jesus (1991)
- Bunty Hunter (1991)
- Dirt Heart (1991)
- Excuse Me (1991)
- From Mi Hold Him (1991)
- Gunman (1991)
- John Law (1991)
- Mandela Come (1991)
- Permit To Bury (1991)
- Step Aside (1991)
- Sunsplash (Don Gorgon) (1991)
- Target Practice (1991)
- Ting A Ling A Ling A School Pickney Sing Ting (1992)
- Hardcore Killing (1993)
- Original Front Tooth Gold Tooth Gun Pon Tooth Don Gorgon! (1993)
- Run come test (1993)
- Artical Don (1994)
- Booyakka Booyakka (1994)
- Hollow Point Bad Boy... (1994)
- Jungle Move (Remarc Remix) (1995)
- Ninja Man Mega Mix (2000)
- Anything Test Dead (2001)
- When It Done/Mad Again (2004)
- Money (Feat. Ninjaman) (2017) (collaboration with Collapsing Scenery)
- Badness (Prod by Monkey Marc) (Digikillaz) (2019)
