= Lee "Scratch" Perry discography =

The discography of Jamaican record producer and singer Lee "Scratch" Perry includes studio albums, live recordings, compilation albums, and collaborations with other artists. Releases have appeared under his own name and that of his studio band The Upsetters. This discography also lists selected appearances on recordings by other artists.

== Discography ==
=== Albums ===
- The Upsetters – The Upsetter (1969)
- The Upsetters – Return of Django (1969)
- The Upsetters – Clint Eastwood (1970)
- The Upsetters – Many Moods of the Upsetters (1970)
- The Upsetters – Scratch the Upsetter Again (1970)
- The Upsetters – Eastwood Rides Again (1970)
- Lee "Scratch" Perry – Africa's Blood (1971)
- Lee "Scratch" Perry – Battle Axe (1972)
- The Upsetters – Scratch the Upsetter – Cloak and Dagger (1973)
- The Upsetters – Rhythm Shower (1973)
- The Upsetters – 14 Dub Blackboard Jungle (1973)
- The Upsetters – Double Seven (1973)
- King Tubby Meets the Upsetter – At the Grass Roots of Dub (1974)
- The Upsetters – Musical Bones (1975)
- The Upsetters – Return of Wax (1975)
- The Mighty Upsetter – Kung Fu Meets the Dragon (1975)
- Lee Perry & The Upsetters – Revolution Dub (1975)
- The Upsetters – Super Ape (1976)
- Lee Perry – Roast Fish Collie Weed & Corn Bread (1978)
- The Upsetters – Return of the Super Ape (1978)
- Lee "Scratch" Perry – The Return of Pipecock Jackxon (1980)
- Lee "Scratch" Perry – Black Ark In Dub (1981)
- Lee "Scratch" Perry & The Majestics – Mystic Miracle Star (1982)
- Lee "Scratch" Perry – History, Mystery & Prophesy (1984)
- Lee 'Scratch' Perry and The Upsetters – Battle of Armagideon (Millionaire Liquidator) (1986)
- Lee 'Scratch' Perry + Dub Syndicate – Time Boom X De Devil Dead (1987)
- Lee "Scratch" Perry – Satan Kicked the Bucket (1988)
- Lee "Scratch" Perry with Mad Professor – Mystic Warrior (1989)
- Lee "Scratch" Perry with Mad Professor – Mystic Warrior Dub (1989)
- Lee "Scratch" Perry – Message from Yard (1990)
- Lee "Scratch" Perry – From the Secret Laboratory (1990)
- Lee "Scratch" Perry Meets Bullwackie – Satan's Dub (1990)
- Lee "Scratch" Perry – Spiritual Healing (1990)
- Lee "Scratch" Perry – Lord God Muzik (1991)
- Lee "Scratch" Perry – The Upsetter and the Beat (1992)
- Lee "Scratch" Perry & Mad Professor – Black Ark Experryments (1995)
- Lee "Scratch" Perry – Experryments at the Grass Roots of Dub (1995)
- Lee "Scratch" Perry featuring Mad Professor/Douggie Digital/Juggler – Super Ape Inna Jungle (1996)
- Lee "Scratch" Perry – Who Put the Voodoo Pon Reggae (1996)
- Mad Professor & Lee " Scratch" Perry – Dub Take the Voodoo Out of Reggae (1996)
- Lee "Scratch" Perry – Technomajikal (1997)
- Lee "Scratch" Perry – Dub Fire (1998)
- Lee "Scratch" Perry – Fire in Dub (1998)
- Lee "Scratch" Perry – On the Wire (2000)
- Mad Professor & Lee "Scratch" Perry – Techno Party (2000)
- Lee "Scratch" Perry & Niney the Observer – Station Underground Report (2001)
- Lee "Scratch" Perry – Jamaican E.T. (2002)
- Lee "Scratch" Perry – Alien Starman (2003)
- Lee "Scratch" Perry and the Whitebellyrats – Panic in Babylon (2004)
- Lee "Scratch" Perry – End of an American Dream (2007)
- Lee "Scratch" Perry – The Mighty Upsetter (2008)
- Lee "$cratch" Perry – Repentance (2008)
- Lee "Scratch" Perry – Scratch Came Scratch Saw Scratch Conquered (2008)
- Lee "Scratch" Perry & Adrian Sherwood – Dub Setter (2009)
- Lee "Scratch" Perry – The Unfinished Master Piece (2010)
- Lee "Scratch" Perry – Revelation (2010)
- Lee "Scratch" Perry & Bill Laswell – Rise Again (2011)
- Lee "Scratch" Perry – Master Piece (2012)
- Lee "Scratch" Perry & ERM – Humanicity (2012)
- The Orb feat. Lee "Scratch" Perry – The Orbserver in the Star House (2012)
- The Orb feat. Lee "Scratch" Perry – More Tales from the Orbservatory (2013)
- Lee "Scratch" Perry – Back on the Controls (2014)
- Lee "Scratch" Perry & Pura Vida – The Super Ape Strikes Again (2015)
- Lee "Scratch" Perry – Must Be Free (2016)
- Lee "Scratch" Perry – Science, Magic, Logic (2017)
- Lee "Scratch" Perry & Subatomic Sound System – Super Ape Returns to Conquer (2017)
- Lee "Scratch" Perry – The Black Album (2018)
- Lee "Scratch" Perry – Alien Dub Massive (2019)
- Lee "Scratch" Perry & Woodie Taylor – Big Ben Rock (2019)
- Lee "Scratch" Perry – Rainford (2019)
- Lee "Scratch" Perry & Mr. Green – Super Ape vs. 緑: Open Door (2019)
- Lee "Scratch" Perry – Life of Plants (2019)
- Lee "Scratch" Perry – Heavy Rain (2019)
- Lee "Scratch" Perry – Live in Brighton (2020)
- Lee "Scratch" Perry – Lee Scratch Perry Presents The Full Experience (2020)
- Lee "Scratch" Perry and Spacewave – Dubz of the Root (2021)
- Lee "Scratch" Perry & Ral Ston – Friends (2021)
- Lee "Scratch" Perry & Ral Ston & Scientist – Scratch & Scientist Meet Ral Ston To Conquer The Evil Duppies (2021)
- Lee "Scratch" Perry & New Age Doom – Lee "Scratch" Perry's Guide to the Universe (2021)
- Lee "Scratch" Perry – Heaven (2023)
- Lee "Scratch" Perry – King Perry (2024)
- Lee "Scratch" Perry and Youth – Spaceship to Mars (2024)
- Lee "Scratch" Perry and Mouse on Mars – "Spatial, No Problem" (2026)

=== Compilation albums ===
- DIP Presents the Upsetter (1975)
- Scratch on the Wire (1979)
- The Upsetter Collection (1981)
- Megaton Dub (1983)
- Arkology (1997)
- Ape-ology (2007)
- King Scratch Musical (2022)

Note: Perry has had numerous compilations come out under his name, with many being illegitimate. This list tries to round up a few more "essential" compilations.

=== Appearances ===
- Co-wrote "Police and Thieves" with Junior Murvin. It was later covered by the Clash on their 1977 debut album, some versions of which include their Perry-produced single "Complete Control".
- "The Only Alternative" on the compilation Roots of Innovation – 15 And X Years On-U Sound (1994) by Dub Syndicate on On-U Sound label.
- "Dr. Lee, PhD" on the album Hello Nasty (1998) by Beastie Boys
- Appears on two tracks on the album Whaa! (2005) by Zuco 103
- Starred in a series of Guinness advertisements (2008)
- Appears on two tracks on the album Nairobi meets Mad Professor: Wu Wei (2009) by Argentinian dub band Nairobi
- Appears on the single Golden Clouds (2012) by the Orb
- Appears on the album Aquarium in Dub (2020) by Aquarium and Levsha-Patsan (Russian: Левша-пацан)
- Frayed Moon Magic Man & Man in The Baloon Feat. Lee Scratch Perry
- Appears on the album Sly & Robbie vs Roots Radics - The Final Battle (2019) by Sly & Robbie and Roots Radics produced by Hernan "Don Camel" Sforzini
- Appears on the album Sly & Robbie vs Roots Radics - The Dub Battle (2021) by Sly & Robbie and Roots Radics produced by Hernan "Don Camel" Sforzini
