= Revolution Dub =

Studio album by Lee Perry & the Upsetters
- Released: 1975
- Recorded: 1968–1975
- Studio: Black Ark, Kingston, Jamaica
- Genre: Dub
- Length: 29:19
- Label: Cactus
- Producer: Lee Perry

Lee Perry & the Upsetters chronology
Kung Fu Meets the Dragon (1975)	Revolution Dub (1975)	Super Ape (1976)

Revolution Dub is a studio album by Jamaican dub producer Lee Perry and his studio band the Upsetters, released in 1975 by Cactus. The album, which features nine pared-down dubs, was the last in a line of releases that year in which Perry began exploring the possible studio techniques at his recently opened studio Black Ark in Kingston, Jamaica. In addition to making early use of a drum machine, the album is characterised by unpredictable drops in the beat, drastic stereo panning and samples of dialogue from television series, particularly British sitcoms, while Perry sings on the album in an eccentric falsetto and portrays different personas, including television characters from Kojak and Doctor on the Go.

Although it only saw limited release, Revolution Dub was later reissued several times, including as part of the remastered Trojan Records compilation Dub-Triptych (2004). Critics and authors have described Revolution Dub as one of Perry's most important and exemplary albums, although some consider it one of his more overlooked productions. The use of sampled television dialogue has been highlighted by several writers as innovative for predating the sampler and for its unusual context, while the album was later influential on artists including Stevie Wonder and Holger Czukay.

== Background and production ==
In 1974, producer Lee Perry opened his recording studio, Black Ark Studio, in the backyard of his home in Kingston, Jamaica. Although Black Ark was technologically limited, with its centrepiece being a four-track recorder with effects units like the Echoplex delay device, Perry used the studio to expand the studio experimentation of his dub music. However, his first albums recorded at the studio, released between 1974 and 1975, were atmospheric, instrumental records which saw the producer, according to writer Michael Veal, "gaining his bearing in his new studio before venturing back onto his sonic limb". Of these albums, DIP Presents the Upsetter and Return of Wax (both 1975) were abstract, while Kung Fu Meets the Dragon (1975) was more melodic, and saw Perry's additive, more eccentric approach from earlier works start to reappear as he settled into the new studio. A further album, Musical Bones (1975), showcased trombonist Vin Gordon and saw release in very limited quantities. After producing Bunny Rugs' album To Love Somebody, in which Perry temporarily renamed the singer Bunny Scott, Revolution Dub was Perry's final 1975 production. Featuring Perry's backing group the Upsetters, it was the first pure dub album to be recorded at Black Ark, consolidating his earlier instrumental albums at the studio, and features production work from as early as 1968.

According to Philip Dodd, Revolution Dub and Perry's subsequent production of Max Romeo's War Ina Babylon (1976) saw the producer explore "the technological constraints and possibilities of his tiny, homely studio." For Revolution Dub, Perry created dubs of some of his heaviest productions of the era, including Junior Byles' "The Long Way", Bunny and Rickey's "Bushweed Corntrash" and Jimmy Riley's cover of the Bobby Womack song "Woman's Gotta Have It". The producer used the Echoplex for echo effects and the Roland Space Echo for reverberation techniques. Throughout the album, he also uses samples of television dialogue, including from English actors James Robertson Justice and Leslie Phillips and the sitcom Doctor on the Go, which he achieved by holding a microphone to the television. Steve Barrow writes that the sitcom samples exemplify Perry being "keen on the odd musical metaphor," while The Wire considers the dialogue snippets to represent the zenith of Perry's ongoing "pastiching of mainstream culture."

== Composition ==
Revolution Dub is less accessible than earlier Perry dub albums like Upsetters 14 Dub Blackboard Jungle (1973), exploring a more pared down sound over nine short tracks, while expanding the producer's dub sound further. The record is characterised by unusual audio techniques, including the dialogue samples, drastic stereo panning between left and right channels and nascent usage of an early drum machine, with the overall effect being described as "absurd" and revealing, according to David Katz, a "potentially menacing" counterpoint to the "seemingly innocuous" rhythms. Frequently, bass and drums abruptly disappear to leave only guitar and fragments of singing; Kodwo Eshun, who describes Revolution Dub as "not so much produced as reduced by Perry," writes that the album experiments with 'exoskeletal' song forms, with each song confounding listeners by frequently leaving expected beats implied rather than played, resulting in unpredictable polyrhythms. Throughout the album, Perry adopts numerous personas, and sings in an eccentric, quivering falsetto that Eshun describes as indecipherable.

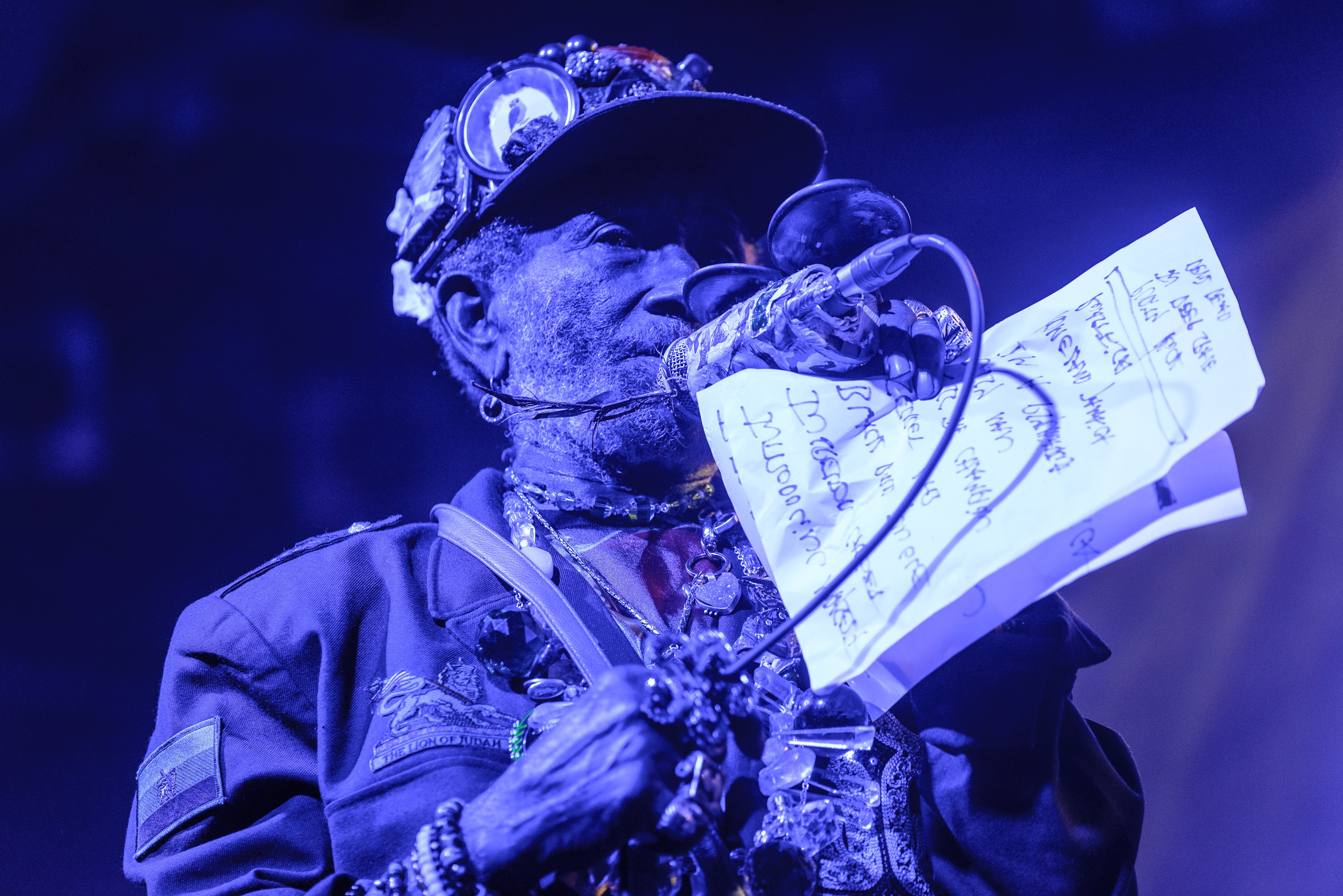
Lee Perry (pictured in 2016) sings in a falsetto voice on Revolution Dub.

On the opening title track, Perry grunts and murmurs and, in an early experiment with a drum machine, uses the Conn Rhythm Box. His proclamation on the song – "This is dub revolution/Music to rock the nation" – sets the stage for "the musical righteousness that is to follow", according to writer Ryan B. Patrick. "Woman's Dub", a minimal dub of "Woman's Gotta Have It", features distorted snares. "Kojak", described by Katz as a "mutant dub" of Bunny Rugs' "Move Out of My Way", features Perry assume the role of the detective from the television series of the same name. Eshun describes the track as "an echo chamber of moans in which space staggers and lurches ominously". On "Doctor on the Go", which uses the rhythm of "The Long Way", Perry plays a gentle melody on the piano and sings the title repeatedly to a response of canned laughter sampled from Doctor on the Go itself. At one point, the laugher subsides into incomprehensible chatter, studio applause and the television show's theme tune.

"Bush Weed", a "pseudo-dub" of "Dushweed Corntrash", highlights Perry's humming. At various points, the drums are reversed, sustaining the backwards shimmer of the cymbal before the snare hits. "Dreadlock Talking" and "Dub the Rhythm" emphasise Perry's slow, minimalist approach to dub. The latter track is a "slow and ghostly" dub of Clancy Eccles' "Feel the Rhythm" and features Perry's belching, which changes the rhythm "into a celebration of dub indigestion", according to Katz. The closing track, "Raindrops", features the sounds of rainfall and a narrator from a nature documentary who announces: "Man has always been a threat to woodland animals." Eshun compares Perry's fragile, trebly voice on the song to Leslie Cheung and highlights his languid tremolo on the song's snare drop.

== Release and reception ==
Professional ratings
Review scores
Source	Rating
AllMusic	4/5 stars
Encyclopedia of Popular Music	4/5 stars
Reggae & Caribbean Music	9/10

Revolution Dub was released in 1975 in the United Kingdom by Cactus, but as with numerous other dub albums by Perry, it was a limited release. However, the record coincided with what British writer James Hamilton felt was dub's arrival as "the roots music of the moment" after two years of growth in Jamaica. Author Christian Habekost described the album title as one of several from Perry to match the spirit of dub's unusual style with a reflection of "the cultural trends and fads of the time." Reviewing the album alongside other new dub releases in Record Mirror & Disc, Hamilton wrote that although Perry elected to use dub as a backing for his "relatively normal singing", the album's best track was "Doctor on the Go", which he described as a "subtle pulsating instrumental" with "snatches" of the Doctor on the Go soundtrack.

In a retrospective review for AllMusic, Rick Anderson wrote that despite its short length, Revolution Dub is essential as an effective encapsulation of Perry and the Upsetters' music. He considers it to capture Perry "at the peak of his somewhat creepy powers", highlighting his deconstructionist dub techniques, "apocalyptic imprecations" and "off-the-wall witticisms", finding the tracks powerful for juxtaposing Perry's absurd production aesthetic with the Upsetters' "utterly rock-solid grooves, grooves which not even the chief Upsetter himself can dislodge." In The Virgin Encyclopedia of Popular Music, writer Colin Larkin called it an "overlooked but innovative dub album" with heavy production, "bursts" of sampled dialogue and "crazy sing-along rhymes". In his book Reggae & Caribbean Music, Dave Thompson referred to the record as a "golden ring" of dub in which Perry treats Byles, Riley and other artists "to some truly dangerous textures." He wrote: "In 1975, this album provoked widespread disconcerting delirium. Today, it still sounds fresh." The editors of The Rough Guide to Reggae highlight Revolution Dub as one of Perry's best records, highlighting the dubs of Byles' "The Long Way" and Riley's "Woman's Gotta Have It" as among its best tracks.

The album was later reissued by the labels Crocodisc and Lagoon and saw release on CD. A larger audience was introduced to Revolution Dub with the release of Dub-Triptych (2004), a Trojan Records compilation that sequenced Revolution Dub with two other acclaimed dub albums by Lee Perry, Cloak & Dagger and 14 Dub Blackboard Jungle (both 1973), on two discs. PopMatters said that, although Revolution Dub was already available on CD, its inclusion on Dub-Triptych appeared more legitimate as the set's "high standard of production" countered the "lack of quality control over Perry's massive oeuvre," and that the improved sound quality made the new version preferable. A clean version of "Dub Revolution" appeared on the Perry's Island Jamaica compilation, Arkology (1997), while a compilation of other Black Ark dubs from the era, Upsetter in Dub, was released the same year.

== Legacy ==
Revolution Dub has been described as one of Perry's most important recordings. In 2016, Exclaim! included Revolution Dub in their "Essential Guide" to Perry's work, where Patrick called it a "an oddly satisfying trip," while Variety listed the "haunting, hypnotic" album among "Perry's most mesmerizing moments". However, PopMatters's editors wrote that, despite the album's important role in dub's evolution, and in Perry's "rise to dub-master", it had become "somewhat unjustly ignored" in the producer's repertoire. Lloyd Bradley writes that Revolution Dub and the material gathered on Upstter in Dub were "little more than overture" to the Upsetters' next release, Super Ape (1976), which saw Perry update the equipment at Black Ark to create a more experimental recording for Island Records. However, Nigel Williamson of Music & Media considers both Revolution Dub and Super Ape to be "ground-breaking albums".

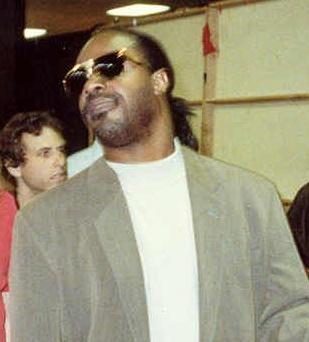
Stevie Wonder took influence from Revolution Dub for "Master Blaster (Jammin')" (1980).

The album is considered innovative for sampling television before the invention of the sampler, with Will Russell of Hot Press describing it as a "sampling revolution". In 1998, The Wire included Revolution Dub in their list of "100 Records That Set the World on Fire (While No One Was Listening)". In addition to finding it to boast some of Perry's "most potent dubs ever", the staff praised the pioneering use of television dialogue fragments as "material completely foreign to popular music", and wrote how the collision between British sitcom samples and Junior Byles' lament "The Long Way" "took reggae into retaliatory culture-shock experimentation. In their list of 50 of the best dub albums, Matador Network wrote that Revolution Dub was a concise take on the genre with some of Perry's best ever work. In the Portable Press guide Encyclo-Weedia, the record is listed among the best stoner albums and is highlighted for its sparseness, minimal grooves and distinctive sense of space.

In the late 1970s, soul singer Stevie Wonder was shown Revolution Dub by his British manager, Keith Harris, and was greatly impressed by Perry's sonic experimentation and scratching styles. The album became one of the singer's favourite reggae albums, and he combined its influence with that of Bob Marley into his reggae-styled 1980 hit "Master Blaster (Jammin')". German musician Holger Czukay, who taped excerpts of shortwave radio for vocals in his own music, recognised Perry as his first "brother in music" for his radical use of television snippets on Revolution Dub and cited the album as one which "changed his life", also citing the music's extreme "emptiness" as unusual in pop music. According to Jon Langford of rock band the Mekons, Revolution Dub was one of three albums that members of his group and Gang of Four listened to in "constant rotation" in their shared student home in Leeds. Eshun describes the snare drum work on "Bush Weed" as anticipating 4Hero's "The Paranormal in 4 Forms" (1994). 33⅓ author R. J. Wheaton cites it among several canonical dub albums whose large influence on 1990s trip hop is apparent through its lengthy basslines, cavernous space and languid tempos.

== Track listing ==
All tracks composed by Lee "Scratch" Perry.

=== Side one ===
1. "Dub Revolution" – 4:26
2. "Woman's Dub" – 3:28
3. "Kojak" – 3:45
4. "Doctor on the Go" – 3:59
5. "Bush Weed" – 3:48

=== Side two ===
1. "Dreadlock Talking" – 3:26
2. "Own Man" – 1:42
3. "Dub the Rhythm" – 3:02
4. "Rain Drops" – 3:03

== Personnel ==
Adapted from the liner notes of Revolution Dub

- Lee Perry – composer, producer
- Creole Music – publishing
