= Subatomic Sound System =

American record label

- Origin: Brooklyn, New York, United States
- Genres: Dub; Hip hop Dancehall; Drum and bass Downtempo; Experimental music
- Years active: 1999–present
- Labels: Subatomic Sound, Modus Vivendi Music, Nomadic Wax, Bastard Jazz
- Members: Larry McDonald; Troy; Omar; Screechy Dan; Treasure Don; Jahdan Blakkamoore; Daddy Lion Chandell; Rhiannon; Naada; Emch; Noah Shachtman; Amon Drum; Benny Beats
- Past members: Victor Rice; Nemiss
- Website: http://www.subatomicsound.com

Subatomic Sound System was founded in 1999 by Emch and Noah Shachtman it is an American record label and collective of musicians, producers, DJs, and visual artists from a variety of backgrounds and traditions. In late 2008 the Subatomic Sound System garnered attention for a limited edition vinyl 12" featuring their collaboration with Vienna's Dubblestandart and dub inventor Lee "Scratch" Perry. These were Perry's first songs in the dubstep genre, one of the first recorded examples of a connection between the popular UK-based electronic genre that emerged in the early 2000's and the Jamaican dub from the 1970's.

Beginning in 2008, Subatomic Sound System started hosting weekly radio shows on 91.5 FM, Radio New York, and webcasts on Brooklyn Radio. In 2011, Subatomic Sound System began performing as Lee "Scratch" Perry's backing band with a hybrid of electronics and live instruments. In 2013, they performed together at Coachella Valley Music and Arts Festival and afterward became Perry's exclusive touring band in North America. In 2017, Subatomic Sound System released their first full-length album with Perry entitled Super Ape Returns to Conquer which debuted No. 5 on the Billboard reggae chart and No. 2 on iTunes US reggae album chart and reached No. 1 on the North American College and Community Radio Chart (NACC) World music chart.

== Performance History ==
In the fall of 2001, Subatomic Sound System won the Red Bull Vinyl Lab competition in New York City using an early incarnation of Native Instruments Traktor DJ software on a laptop at a time when laptops were not commonly used in musical performances. When judges discovered software had been used to create the mix CD, it sparked controversy amongst the judges. In the end, judges conceded that there were no valid grounds for disqualifying Subatomic Sound System for using DJ software rather than traditional vinyl and turntables, so they upheld their victory in the competition.

In 2007, Subatomic Sound System increased touring throughout North America and Europe. The group performed in a variety of configurations from a live band of ten, to an electronic trio, to DJs as styles like dubstep increased in popularity and the interest in new dub oriented music emanating from New York City increased (largely the result of successful releases from NYC artists such as Dr. Israel, Ticklah, Easy Star All-Stars, Dub Gabriel, Bill Laswell, Matisyahu, and others).

On July 19, 2009, Subatomic Sound System performed at Summerstage in Central Park, New York City, along with Lee "Scratch" Perry & Dubblestandart (with a cameo from Ari Up) and Alpha Blondy. The lineup for this event drew the largest Summerstage crowd of the season, confirming organizers' expectations. Given the multicultural and cross generational audiences who turn out in Central Park, organizers had hoped this billing would draw on the connection between modern incarnations of dub based music such as dubstep and the dub and roots reggae styles from over 30 years prior, originated by Perry in Jamaica that influenced artists like Blondy to extend that sound in Africa. Those styles then influenced groups like Dubblestandart and Subatomic Sound System in Europe and the US to meld that sound with other contemporary electronic based genres.

In 2012, Perry, with Subatomic Sound System as his band and opening act, went on tour across the US from May 16 through May 26. In September, they performed together again at Dub Champions Festival in New York City, Music Hall of Williamsburg.

In 2013, Perry and Subatomic Sound System were touring the West Coast and Southwest USA including two shows at the Coachella Arts & Music Festival, April 12 & 19, performing music ranging from the roots reggae off Perry's Super Ape album to dubstep and bass music riddims by Subatomic Sound System.

== Radio Shows ==
Beginning in 2008, Subatomic Sound System started Subatomic Sound Radio, hosting weekly radio shows on 91.5FM, Radio New York and Brooklyn Radio webcasts. The Radio New York show is part of a nightly program called Mo'Glo sponsored by Seattle-based public radio station KEXP.

== Release history ==
=== "Black Ark Vampires" Lee "Scratch" Perry & Subatomic Sound System ===
The song "Black Ark Vampires" premiered on October 31, 2014, via the Brooklyn-based Jamaican culture website Large Up, with an explanation of Perry's lyrics about killing vampires and why Perry burned down his Black Ark Studios in Jamaica decades before. In the song, Perry describes killing vampires with fire, electric wire, roast corn, and his own hair in locations around the globe including America, England, and Kingston, Jamaica. Live concerts by Perry and Subatomic Sound System from 2001 to 2014 combined digital electronics and live instrumentalists and singers and this recorded song can also be heard to use a similar blend of elements specifically instrumentation like electric guitar, bass, percussion, and harmonized background vocal produced with space echo and spring reverb effects in a fashion typical of reggae recordings from Perry's Black Ark Studios during the 1970s, as well as using electronic synthesized sub-bass and digital drums common to 21st century electronic music genres like dubstep and trap music. The song was released on vinyl 45 rpm exclusively on November 4, 2014, and appeared at No. 1 on Juno Records charts in both dub and reggae. Reggae dancehall vocalist Jahdan Blakkamoore appeared as a supporting vocalist on the track, a collaborator on several other Perry & Subatomic Sound releases as well as vocalist and primary writer on Snoop Lion and Major Lazer albums. Blakkamoore is mostly known for his releases both solo and with his band Noble Society whose release "Living the Life" came out on the Subatomic Sound label.

=== Iron Devil: Lee "Scratch" Perry's first dubstep track ===
In the fall of 2008, Subatomic Sound System produced a collaborative remix in a dubstep style with Vienna's Dubblestandart and Perry, who were working jointly on completing an album entitled Return From Planet Dub which included new versions of several of Perry's most famous tunes and riddims from his hey day in Jamaica during the 1970s. The Subatomic Sound System remix was Perry's first release in the dubstep style that by late 2008 had spread from the UK and was beginning to see worldwide popularity among electronic music fans and an ever-growing crowd of curious music listeners. The remix was titled "Iron Devil" and was based on the riddim used for some of Lee's biggest hits like "Disco Devil", "Chase The Devil" with Max Romeo, and "Croaking Lizard" from Lee's seminal Super Ape album. A short run of those records was pressed as advance promotion for the forthcoming album and included some exclusive vinyl only mixes, namely dubstep and 1980s dancehall reggae style mixes of "Iron Devil" on the A side and two remixes of Dubblestandart tracks by Tom Watson, a producer from Paris, France, on the B side, one of which was "Wadada" (originally recorded by Dub Syndicate) the first ever dubstep track featuring the Jamaican voice of thunder, Prince Far-I.

The limited edition vinyl 12" was distributed in either a blank white jacket or, for about 150 copies, in a vintage red, gold and green comic art jacket that was acquired from Tuff Gong in Jamaica and bore the Solographic Productions imprint (leading some stores to incorrectly list Solographic as the label for the release). The record itself had a blank white label marked on only on the A-side by a devil head hand stamped on it with red ink. It sold out in less than a week and it quickly became highly sought after on secondary vinyl markets and vinyl collectors' sites such as Discogs.

The release has historical significance for several reasons. Firstly, at the age of 73, Perry was suddenly finding new audiences for his music worldwide through the evolution of dub into dubstep. Secondly, its popularity was indicative of a cultural diaspora and evolution of a non-commercial subgenre of music developed in Jamaica largely by Perry into a movement that had rippled around the world through various music genres to later create a subgenre of electronic music called dubstep over 30 years later in the UK that reunited its offspring with their forefather and propelled them both to broader prominence that in the process crossed cultural, generational and racial boundaries.

=== Blackboard Jungle dubstep ===
In July 2009, another 12" was released that featured dubstep tracks based on "Blackboard Jungle", the title track of The Upsetters' album Blackboard Jungle Dub produced by Perry and considered by some to be the first ever dub album. The original Blackboard Jungle Dub album from the 1970s was mastered and re-released as Upsetters 14 Dub Blackboard Jungle and the tune "Blackboard Jungle" was renamed "Black Panta". Dubblestandart remade the tune in collaboration with Perry on their album Return From Planet Dub in spring 2009. That release also had remixes of the song by Subatomic Sound System. For the dubstep vinyl release that followed, Subatomic Sound System developed new versions of "Blackboard Jungle" based on that remix and involving Guyana-born/NYC-based dancehall reggae vocalist Jahdan Blakkamoore for vocals along with Perry. The vinyl release 12" catalog number was SS009 and was followed up in 2010 by digital releases SS010 and SS011 that featured alternative versions. A mini-documentary featuring Perry covering the making of the "Iron Devil" and "Blackboard Jungle" dubstep remixes with Dubblestandart and Subatomic Sound System, their capacity crowd performance in Central Park, and the evolution of dub to dubstep, was created and released on the internet via sites like YouTube.

=== Electronic Cumbia Dub ===
In late 2011, the Subatomic Sound label released a project called Sancocho e Tigres, a collective of young producers and musicians from across South and Central America. The project was organized by Caballo (Rebel Records) from Colombia. Subatomic Sound put out two releases, one of a single, "Lujo De Pobre", that included a song as well as the self-produced samples by the collective members used to create the song. A second release followed with various versions of the song that each member put together from those same samples. Later that year Subatomic Sound System had Colombian producer Bleepolar (of Sanchocho e Tigres) remix "Dem Can't Stop We From Talk" with Anthony B, one of the first instances of a Jamaican dancehall artist appearing on an official cumbia remix.

=== On All Frequencies ===
The first official full-length album by Subatomic Sound System, On All Frequencies, covered a broad range of genres, tempos and timbres. On All Frequencies entered the CMJ radio Top 40 charts in both "electronic" and "world" categories simultaneously during spring 2007. The album received positive reactions across a broad spectrum of the electronic, hip hop and reggae press. It was described by BPM magazine in its vital releases column as "connecting the dots between dub, dancehall, hip hop, drum & bass, downtempo and broken beat". It received a four afro rating from the popular website Okayplayer, (their ratings system based on site founder and The Roots drummer Questlove's hairstyle), who opined, "These beats could become the blueprint for future producers...Genius producing", a "certified gunsmoke!" review from OJ Lima, former VIBE magazine editor and founder of DJ culture site, Limachips, and the reggae-centric Beat magazine wrote that the song "'Rize Up' is a virtual revolutionary anthem". The album was highlighted in Beyond Race magazine's 2007 Music Issue and Subatomic Sound System performed at the magazine release party in Brooklyn, New York. The Subatomic Sound System System song "Breakin' Down the Barriers" inspired the magazine's editor to use the title as the name of the subsequent issue and it became a theme song for the magazine's mission.

== Discography ==
=== Albums, EPs, digital singles ===
- Rockin’ Like a Champion Mykal Rose, Subatomic Sound System, & Hollie Cook (2024, Dubshot & Controlled Substance Sound Labs | digital & vinyl )
- Babylon Soon Fall Subatomic Sound System & Screechy Dan (2020, Subatomic Sound | SS038 | digital )
- Revolution 2 Freedom Subatomic Sound System & Junior Dread (2020, Subatomic Sound | SS037 | digital )
- Champion Sound Subatomic Sound System & Screechy Dan (2020, Subatomic Sound | SS037 | digital )
- Shaolin Dub Subatomic Sound System (2019, Subatomic Sound | SS036 | digital )
- Super Ape Returns To Conquer Lee "Scratch" Perry & Subatomic Sound System (featuring Screechy Dan, Jahdan Blakkamoore, & Ari Up) (2017, Subatomic Sound | SS033 | digital, CD, vinyl via Echo Beach )
- NYC-2-Africa-2-Brasil (featuring Anthony B, Jahdan Blakkamoore, Bajah, & Nomadic Wax) remixes by Victor Rice, Maga Bo, Buguinha Dub (2016, Subatomic Sound | SS030A | digital)
- NYC-2-Africa (featuring Anthony B, Jahdan Blakkamoore, Bajah, & Nomadic Wax) (2010, Subatomic Sound | SS016 | digital)
- Blackboard Jungle Vol.2 Respect My Shit (featuring Dubblestandart, Lee Scratch Perry, Jahdan Blakkamoore) (2009, Subatomic Sound | SS011 | digital)
- Blackboard Jungle Vol.1 Respect the Foundation (featuring Dubblestandart, Lee Scratch Perry, Jahdan Blakkamoore) (2009, Subatomic Sound / | SS010 | digital)
- Heat Brings Heat (featuring Pete Miser) (2008, Subatomic Sound / Modus Vivendi | SS007 | digital)
- Crucial Times (2008, Subatomic Sound/ Modus Vivendi | SS006 | digital)
- On All Frequencies (Instrumentals & Mixtape) (2008, Subatomic Sound / Modus Vivendi | SS00 | digital)
- On All Frequencies (Instrumentals) (2008, Subatomic Sound / Modus Vivendi | SS005 | digital)
- On All Frequencies (featuring King Django)(2007, Subatomic Sound / Modus Vivendi / Nomadic Wax | MVM009 | CD, digital)
- Lost Hits Vol. 1: Dancehall versus Hip Hop (featuring Pete Miser and King Django) (2005, Subatomic Sound / | SS004 | digital)
- No Bloodshed (Vocal Mix) (Nov. 3, 2023, Subatomic Sound / Don Husky | digital)

=== Vinyl ===
- Black Ark Vampires/Dub Lee "Scratch" Perry & Subatomic Sound System 7-inch 45 rpm (2014, Subatomic Sound | cat# SS020)
- Dem Can't Stop We From Talk (Dubiterian remix)/NYC-2-Africa riddim (Dubiterian remix) Anthony B, Subatomic Sound System & Nomadic Wax 7-inch 45 rpm (2014, Subatomic Sound | cat# SS028)
- Jah is Coming/Dubbing on the Moon Subatomic Sound System & Thomas Blondet 7-inch 45 rpm (2014, Subatomic Sound | cat# SS027)
- Dem Can't Stop We From Talk/NYC-2-Africa riddim Anthony B meets Subatomic Sound System & Nomadic Wax 7-inch 45 rpm (2011, Subatomic Sound | cat# SS024)
- Dem Can't Stop We From Talk/Kingston Riot riddim Anthony B meets Dubblestandart 7-inch 45 rpm (2011, Subatomic Sound | cat# SS023)
- Vampires & Informers Elephant Man 12-inch 33 rpm (2010, Subatomic Sound | cat# SS018)
- Hello, Hello, Hell is Very Low b/w Bed Athletes featuring Lee "Scratch" Perry and Ari Up of The Slits 7-inch 45 rpm (2010, Subatomic Sound | cat#SS014) [#1 on Ernie B reggae vinyl chart]
- Chrome Optimism Dubblestandart meets Lee "Scratch" Perry and David Lynch | 12-inch vinyl, 33 rpm (2010, Subatomic Sound | cat# SS012)
- Blackboard Jungle featuring Lee "Scratch" Perry, Jahdan Blakkamoore, Dubblestandart 12-inch 33 rpm (2009, Subatomic Sound | cat#SS009)
- Iron Devil featuring Lee "Scratch" Perry and Dubblestandart 12-inch 33 rpm (2008, Subatomic Sound | cat#SS008)
- Our Father, Our King 7-inch 45 rpm (2008, Bastard Jazz Recordings | cat#BJ7003)

=== Remixes ===
- Wickedness Dub Boostive (2023, Stoopid Records | digital) included melodica dub Wickedness (Subatomic Sound System remix)
- Green Brain Lee Scratch Perry, Yaadcore, & Green Lion Crew (2023, Ineffable Records | digital) included 2 versions Green Brain (Subatomic Sound System remix) & Green Brain (Subatomic Sound System dub)
- Amor e Revolucao Maga Bo, Dandara Manoela (2022, Kaxambu Records | digital & Vinyl 12") included Amor e Revolucao (Subatomic Sound System remix)
- Hulusi Piper Street Sound & General Pecos (2022, Piper Street | digital & Vinyl 10") included 3 versions Hulusi (Subatomic Sound System remix)
- Q Street Super Hi Fi (2012, Electric Cowbell | digital ) included Q Street (Subatomic Sound System remix)
- Dangerous See-I (2011, Collision | digital ) included vocal and dub mixes Dangerous (Subatomic Sound System remix)
- Happy & Deep Dark Dub Dubmatix (2011, Fort Knox Recordings | digital ) included Happy & Deep Dark Dub (Subatomic Sound System remix)
- Amsterdam Marlon Asher & Leah Rosier (2011, Dubbhism | digital) included remix Amsterdam (Subatomic Sound System mix)
- Vampires & Informers Elephant Man (2011, Subatomic Sound | cat# SS019 | digital) included remixes Vampires & Informers (Subatomic Sound System Bloodstep mix), Vampires & Informers (Subatomic Sound System bloodsucker's dub)
- Modern Dayz Slavery The Bant Singh Project featuring Delhi Sultanate (2011, Word Sound Power | digital) included remix Modern Dayz Slavery (Subatomic Sound System remix)
- Vampires & Informers Elephant Man (2010, Subatomic Sound | cat# SS018 | vinyl) included remixes Vampires & Informers (Subatomic Sound System Bloodstep mix)
- Chrome Optimism Dubblestandart meets Lee "Scratch" Perry and David Lynch (2010, Subatomic Sound | cat# SS015 | digital) included remixes Chrome Optimism (Subatomic Sound System remix), Chrome Optimism (Ming vs. Subatomic Sound System remix), & Chrome Optimism (April White vs. Subatomic Sound System remix)
- Chrome Optimism Dubblestandart meets Lee "Scratch" Perry and David Lynch (2010, Subatomic Sound | cat# SS012 | 12-inch vinyl, 33 rpm) included remixes Chrome Optimism (Subatomic Sound System remix) & Deadly Funny (Subatomic Sound System dub)
- Luv 'n Liv Dub Gabriel w/U-Roy (2010, Destroy All Concepts | cat# DAC009 | digital) included remixes Luv 'n Liv (Ming vs. Subatomic Sound System remix)
- Dubstep EP Dubblestandart (2009, Collision/Select Cuts/ Echo Beach| | digital) included remixes: "Iron Devil (Subatomic Sound System remix)" "Blackboard Jungle (Subatomic Sound System remix)"
- Return From Planet Dub Dubblestandart, Lee "Scratch" Perry and Ari Up (2009, Collision/Select Cuts/ Echo Beach| CCT3019-2 | Double CD, digital) included remixes: "Blackboard Jungle (Subatomic Sound System remix)" Extensive liner notes by writer David Katz
- Remixed Eyesight Project (2008, Modus Vivendi Music | MVM007 | digital) included remixes: "On Chrome (Subatomic Sound System remix)"

=== Compilations ===
- SUBcontinentalBASS (2011, High Chai | digital) included song "NYC-2-India" a new version on NYC-2-Africa riddim with vocals by Delhi Sultanate. Hit No. 1 on Beatport reggae chart.
- The Sound of Rhythm & Culture (2010, Rhythm & Culture | CD, digital) included songs: "Dub Steppa" by Thomas Blondet & Subatomic Sound System
- BKLYN: Heavy Sound from the County of Kings (2009, Bastard Jazz Recordings | CD, digital) included songs: "Our Father, Our King"
- Nickodemus & Mariano present Turntables on the Hudson 10 Year Anniversary (2009, Wonderwheel | Double CD, digital) included songs: "Our Father, Our King"
- Northern Faction 4 (2009, Balanced Records | CD, digital) included songs: "Walking On The Moon" a dub version of the Police song based on the music from "Our Father, Our King"
- Modus Vivendi Music Vol. 2 (2008, Modus Vivendi Music | MVM008 | CD, digital) included songs: "Ghetto Champion", "Our Father, Our King (Golden remix)"

=== Mixes ===
- Code Orange Relaxation Techniques Subatomic Sound System (2002, Subatomic Sound | CD)

=== Unreleased and forthcoming works ===
- "Revolution" Ari Up and The Slits (cover version of the famous Dennis Brown song)| Subatomic Sound System dub mix | (2008, unreleased)
- "21st Century Life" Sam Sparro | Island Records | Subatomic Sound System dub mix for U.S. single release | (2009, unreleased)
- "Black and Gold (song)" Sam Sparro | Island Records |Subatomic Sound System remix of 2009 Grammy nominated song for U.S. single release | (2008, unreleased)

=== Television and film ===
- Californication (TV series) | 2012: Season 5 ep 111 | Showtime | features the song "The Chronicles" by Subatomic Sound System
- CSI:Miami | By The Book episode aired Oct. 30, 2011 | CBS | The Halloween episode features the remix of "Vampires & Informers" by Elephant Man on Subatomic Sound label.
- Vans Triple Crown of Surfing | North Shore Underground - Hank Gaskell | Fuel TV & Vans Triple Crown Surfing website | "Ghetto Champion" and several Subatomic Sound System songs this and other 2010 highlight segments
- Dog The Bounty Hunter | The Big Wipeout | A&E Network | Subatomic Sound System song "Ghetto Champion" was the featured song on this episode
- Dog The Bounty Hunter | Smackdown of Baby Lyssa | A&E Network | Subatomic Sound System song "Criminal" was the featured song on this episode
- Dog The Bounty Hunter | Crime Don't Pay | A&E Network | Subatomic Sound System song "Doin' It" was the featured song on this episode
