= Run for Cover (Lee Perry song) =

Single by Lee "Scratch" Perry as Lee "King" Perry
- B-side: "Something You've Got"; alternatively "Run for Cover (instrumental version)"
- Released: 1967
- Recorded: Kingston, Jamaica
- Genre: Rocksteady, reggae
- Label: Wirl (label) Jamaica, Doctor Bird (label) (UK)
- Songwriter: Lee Perry
- Producer: Lee Perry

"Run for Cover" is a 1967 rocksteady and reggae single by Lee "Scratch" Perry, credited as Lee "King" Perry. The recording featured Perry, his band, Lynn Taitt on guitar and The Sensations as backing singers. It was recorded at Clifford Rae's WIRL studio and appeared on the WIRL record label in Jamaica, then in the UK on Graeme Woodall's Doctor Bird (label) (DB 1073), both pressings with "Something You've Got" on the B-side.

It was one of the first reggae singles to have two versions, with Perry recording an instrumental version as an alternative B-side. The lyrics of "Run for Cover" had a thinly concealed subtext attacking Perry's previous employer Clement Dodd (Sir Coxsone), a theme shared with his song "The Upsetter" and even the instrumental "Return of Django".

The original version is on several compilation albums, both of Perry's songs and reggae classics, but the song did not receive a full album release until a version appeared on Perry's album Revelation (2010).

The Wailers also released a song titled "Run for Cover" - their first release on Tuff Gong - but this was based on Lee Perry and Marley's "Soul Rebel", not on Perry's "Run for Cover".
