= Not Giving Up (disambiguation) =

"Not Giving Up" is a 2014 single by The Saturdays.

Not Giving Up may also refer to:

- "Not Giving Up", song by Leo Graham
- "Not Giving Up", song by Daniel Merriweather from Love & War
- "Not Giving Up", song by Royal Wood from We Were Born to Glory
- "Not Giving Up", song by Yolanda Adams from Becoming
- "Not Giving Up", song by Amy Grant from How Mercy Looks from Here
- "Not Givin' Up", song by After Class

== See also ==
- "Not Giving Up on Love", song by Sophie Ellis-Bextor from Make a Scene
- "No Giving Up", song by Crossfade from Crossfade
