= Run for Cover =

Run for Cover may refer to:

== Music ==
- Run for Cover Records, an independent record label founded in 2004

=== Albums ===
- Run for Cover (Gary Moore album), 1985, or the title song
- Run for Cover (The Living Sisters album), 2013

=== Songs ===
- "Run for Cover" (Lee Perry song), 1967
- "Run for Cover" (Sugababes song), 2001
- "Run for Cover" (The Killers song), 2017
- "Run for Cover", a 1955 title song by Jackson/Brooks for the Run for Cover western movie
- "Run for Cover", a 1970 song by The Wailers released on their record label Tuff Gong
- "Run for Cover", a 1976 song by Streetwalkers from the album Red Card
- "Run for Cover", a 1981 song by David Sanborn from the album Voyeur
- "Run for Cover", a 1983 song by Quiet Riot from Metal Health
- "Run for Cover", a 1987 song by Basia from her Time and Tide album
- "Run for Cover", a 1990 song by Eric B. & Rakim from Let the Rhythm Hit 'Em
- "Run for Cover", a 1998 promo song by Flipmode Squad (Busta Rhymes) from The Imperial
- "Run 4 Cover", a 2006 song by Basement Jaxx from the Crazy Itch Radio album, in turn from the soundtrack Marc 2 The Final Chapters
- "Run for Cover", a 2006 song by KJ-52 from KJ-52 Remixed
- "Run for Cover", a 2009 EP and title song by Joni Fuller
- "Run for Cover", a 2013 single by Blitz Kids (rock band)

== Film ==
- Run for Cover (film), a 1955 film directed by Nicholas Ray and starring James Cagney
- Run for Cover, a 1995 film written and directed by Richard W. Haines
