= Cloak and Dagger =

The phrase cloak and dagger describes situations involving intrigue, secrecy, espionage, or mystery.

Cloak and Dagger may also refer to:

== Music ==
- Cloak & Dagger (The Upsetters album) (1973)
- Cloak & Dagger (Wet Wet Wet album) (1992)
- Cloak and Dagger, a 1983 album by Witchfynde
- "Cloak and Dagger", a 1981 song by Daniel Amos from ¡Alarma! (album)
- "Cloak and Dagger", a 1989 song by Black Sabbath from Headless Cross
- "Cloak and Dagger", a 1984 song by Nik Kershaw from Human Racing
- "Cloak n Dagger", a 2021 song by Glaive and Ericdoa

== Other uses ==
- Cloak and Dagger (characters), a Marvel Comics superhero duo
  - Cloak & Dagger (TV series)
- Cloak and Dagger (1946 film), an espionage film
- Cloak & Dagger (1984 film), a thriller film
  - Cloak & Dagger (video game), an Atari video game
- Cloak and Dagger (radio series), an NBC radio series

== See also ==
- "Clock and Dagger", an episode of Man Finds Food
