= Eastwood Rides Again =

Studio album by the Upsetters
- Released: 1970
- Genre: Reggae
- Length: 36:21
- Label: Trojan
- Producer: Lee Perry

The Upsetters chronology
The Good, the Bad and the Upsetters (1970)	Eastwood Rides Again (1970)	The Good, the Bad and the Upsetters (1971)

Lee "Scratch" Perry chronology
Scratch the Upsetter Again (1970)	Eastwood Rides Again (1970)	The Good, the Bad and the Upsetters (1971)

Eastwood Rides Again is a studio album by the Upsetters, released in 1970.

Professional ratings
Review scores
Source	Rating
AllMusic	4/5 stars

== Track listing ==
All tracks composed by Lee "Scratch" Perry, except where indicated.

1. "Eastwood Rides Again" – 2:59
2. "Hit Me" – 2:28
3. "Knock on Wood" (The Untouchables) – 2:46
4. "Pop Corn" – 2:10
5. "Catch This" – 2:18
6. "You Are Adorable" – 3:28
7. "Capsol" – 2:26
8. "Power Pack" – 2:29
9. "Dollar in the Teeth" – 2:33
10. "Baby Baby" (Val Bennett) – 2:15
11. "Django (Ol' Man River)" (Jerome Kern/Oscar Hammerstein II) – 2:31
12. "Red Hot" – 2:46
13. "Salt and Pepper" – 2:37
14. "Tight Spot" – 2:35
