= Seven & Seven (disambiguation) =

7 and 7 is a highball cocktail made using Seagram's Seven Crown whiskey and 7 Up lemon-lime soda.

Seven and Seven, 7 & 7, etc. may also refer to:

- "7 and 7 Is", a 1966 song by Arthur Lee, recorded by his band Love, later covered by various artists
- Seven & Seven (MC Lyte album), 1998
- Seven & Seven (Richard Marx album), 2012

== See also ==
- Double Seven
