= Clint Eastwood (disambiguation) =

Clint Eastwood (born 1930) is an American filmmaker and actor.

Clint Eastwood may also refer to:

- Clint Eastwood (album), an album by The Upsetters
- Clint Eastwood (musician), Jamaican reggae deejay
- "Clint Eastwood" (song), a song by Gorillaz
- "Clint Eastwood", an alias used by Marty McFly in the film Back to the Future Part III
