= Freaky Girl =

Freaky Girl or Freaky Girls may refer to:

- "Freaky Girl", a song by Mad Professor from the album Dub Maniacs on the Rampage
- "Freaky Girl", a song by Shaggy from the album Hot Shot
- "Frealy Gorö", a 2003 song by DJ Thomilla feat. Ayak
- "Freaky Gurl", a song by Gucci Mane first released in 2006 on his album Hard to Kill
- "Freaky Girls", a song by Megan Thee Stallion featuring SZA from the album Good News
- "10 Freaky Girls", a song by Metro Boomin featuring 21 Savage from the album Not All Heroes Wear Capes

== See also ==
- "I Love It" (Kanye West and Lil Pump song), which was released in a "Freaky Girl Edit"
