= Soledad Brothers (disambiguation) =

The Soledad Brothers were three prison inmates who allegedly murdered a security guard in 1970.

Soledad Brothers may also refer to:

- Soledad Brothers (band), an American rock band
- "Soledad Brothers", a song by Mad Professor on the album Dub Maniacs on the Rampage

== See also ==
- Soledad Brother, 1970 prison memoir by George Jackson
