= History, Mystery & Prophesy =

1984 reggae album by Lee "Scratch" Perry

Studio album by Lee "Scratch" Perry
- Released: April 1984
- Studio: Compass Point (Nassau, The Bahamas); Joe Gibbs (Kingston, Jamaica)
- Genre: Reggae fusion; dub
- Length: 36:07
- Label: Island
- Producer: Lee "Scratch" Perry

Lee "Scratch" Perry chronology
Mystic Miracle Star (1982)	History, Mystery & Prophesy (1984)	Battle of Armagideon (Millionaire Liquidator) (1986)

History, Mystery & Prophesy is a studio album by the Jamaican record producer and singer Lee "Scratch" Perry, released in April 1984 by Island Records. The album was recorded at a time when Perry had had a long-standing grudge with Island Records, and features his trademark dub reggae sound mixed with synth-pop.

== Critical reception ==
Professional ratings
Review scores
Source	Rating
AllMusic	3/5 stars

In a retrospective review for AllMusic, critic John Dougan wrote of the album, "Perry's weakest Island/Mango release. All the rough edges are gone, and Perry's berserk charm is in short supply." Adding that "Still, because it's Perry, there are tracks to recommend ("Heads of Government" being the most notable), but there are plenty better Perry records to be had."

== Track listing ==
All tracks are written by Lee "Scratch" Perry.

Side one
No.	Title	Length
1.	"Mr. Music"	4:50
2.	"The Ganja Man"	4:20
3.	"Nice Time"	5:08
4.	"Tiger Lion"	2:52

Side two
No.	Title	Length
5.	"Funky Joe"	5:09
6.	"Heads of Government"	4:36
7.	"Daniel"	3:39
8.	"Bed Jamming"	5:30
Total length:		36:07

== Personnel ==
Credits are adapted from the History, Mystery & Prophesy liner notes.

Musicians

- Lee "Scratch" Perry – lead vocals
- Harold Barney – backing vocals
- Pat Carey – backing vocals
- Abigail Charlon – backing vocals

Technical

- Lee "Scratch" Perry – producer; engineer
- Errol Thompson – engineer; mixing
- The Upsetters – engineer
- Andy Lyden – engineer
- Steven Stanley – engineer
- Kendal Stubbs – engineer
- Sean Burrows – assistant engineer
- Frank Gibson – assistant engineer
