= The Good, the Bad and the Upsetters =

Studio album by the Upsetters
- Released: 1970
- Genre: Reggae
- Length: 41:28
- Label: Trojan
- Producer: Bruce White, Tony Cousins

The Upsetters chronology
Scratch the Upsetter Again (1970)	The Good, the Bad and the Upsetters (1970)	Eastwood Rides Again (1970)

The Good, the Bad and the Upsetters

Studio album by the Upsetters
- Released: 1971
- Genre: Reggae
- Length: 36:48
- Producer: Lee "Scratch" Perry

The Upsetters chronology
Eastwood Rides Again (1970)	The Good, the Bad and the Upsetters (1971)	Africa's Blood (1972)

The Good, the Bad and the Upsetters is a studio album by the Upsetters, released in 1970. Lee Perry had no direct involvement with this album and never considered it an Upsetters album.

In response to the album's release, Perry released an album in Jamaica a year later with the same title and Trojan artwork but with a completely different track listing. It was only released in small quantities at the time, but it was reissued in January 2014 on Cherry Red Records' Hot Milk label.

== Track listing ==
=== UK edition ===
1. "Capo" (Glen Adams) – 3:05
2. "Phil the Fluter" (R. Lewis) – 3:11
3. "Guns of Navarone" (Dimitri Tiomkin/Paul Francis Webster) – 3:13
4. "What Do You Say" (Glen Adams) – 4:04
5. "Straight to the Head" (Aston Barrett) – 4:18
6. "Red or Red" (Aston Barrett/Glen Adams) – 3:50
7. "Mellow Mood" (Aston Barrett/Glen Adams) – 3:00
8. "Family Man" (R. Lewis) – 3:19
9. "Oney (Happy Clap)" (Winston Wright) – 4:13
10. "Mama Look (Monkey Man)" (Toots Hibbert) – 2:31
11. "Snow White" (Aston Barrett/Glen Adams) – 3:31
12. "The Good the Bad & the Upsetters" (Aston Barrett/Glen Adams) – 3:13

=== Jamaican edition ===
Produced and directed by Lee Scratch Perry. All tracks composed by Lee "Scratch" Perry.

==== Side one ====
1. "Same Thing All Over" – 3:17
2. "It's All in the Game" – 3:17
3. "Big Ball" – 2:20
4. "If You Don't Mind" – 2:23
5. "Dracula" – 3:35
6. "It' Alright" – 2:33
7. "Man to Man V. 3" - 3:13

==== Side two ====
1. "Soul Rebel V. 4" – 2:50
2. "Must Reach You" – 2:30
3. "Equalizer" – 1:58
4. "Down the Road" – 2:43
5. "Some Sign" – 2:45
6. "On the Rock" – 2:12
7. "Same Thing V. 3" – 3:12
