= Full Experience (album) =

Album by Aura Lewis

Studio album by Aura Lewis
- Released: 1990
- Recorded: 1978
- Studio: Black Ark (Kingston, Jamaica)
- Genre: Reggae
- Label: Blue Moon
- Producer: Lee "Scratch" Perry

Full Experience is a mini-album of recordings by Aura Lewis and her group Full Experience, recorded in 1978, but not released until 1990.

Lewis became a regular backing vocalist for Lee "Scratch" Perry at his Black Ark studio, and began working on a group project called Full Experience along with another Black Ark session singer, Pamela Reed. Perry agreed to produce an album by the group, and drafted in Candy MacKenzie to make the group up to a trio. Lewis explained the concept behind the group:

"Full Experience" was the song I wrote for this idea I had of putting the two other women, black women, as a group that would be three women from the three parts of the African diaspora, which is the Continent itself, the Caribbean and America.

They recorded eleven tracks in 1978 with a backing band including Mikey "Boo" Richards, Winston Wright, Geoffrey Chung, Michael Chung, and Sticky, including a version of Nina Simone's "Young Gifted and Black", retitled "Young, Gifted and Broke", and the track "Full Experience" (originally called "Stricly Roots"), which featured Boris Gardiner on bass guitar. The tracks recorded also featured versions of the Swahili songs "Malaika" and "Haposamane". The album was never issued in Jamaica, amid tensions between band members and Perry's partner Pauline Morrison, and Perry's increasingly erratic behaviour, which would lead to the destruction of his studio, and eventually Lewis asked Jimmy Cliff (who she had toured with) to help her buy the master tapes from Perry. Cliff and Perry came to a deal, but then Cliff issued singles by another group under the Full Experience name on his Sunpower label in 1978, and refused to give Lewis the master tapes. Eventually, Lewis was able to obtain a tape containing five tracks from the sessions and these were licensed to the French Blue Moon label, and released in 1990. The album sleeve features an image of Lewis superimposed on a photograph of the outside of the Black Ark studio. "Full Experience" was included on the album Baffling Smoke Signal: The Upsetter Shop Volume 3 in 2002.

== Track listing ==
1. "Young Gifted and Broke"
2. "Can't See You"
3. "At Midnite"
4. "Full Experience"
5. "Nar Soh, So It Stay"

== Personnel ==
- Aura Lewis - vocals
- Pamela Reed - vocals
- Candy MacKenzie - vocals
- Mikey "Boo" Richards - drums
- Winston Wright - keyboards
- Geoffrey Chung - bass guitar
- Michael Chung - guitar
- Uziah "Sticky" Thompson - percussion
- Boris Gardiner - bass guitar
- Lee "Scratch" Perry - percussion, production
