= Sounds Like London =

Music history book

Sounds Like London: 100 Years of Black Music in the Capital
- Author: Lloyd Bradley
- Language: English
- Subject: Black music in London
- Published: London
- Publisher: Serpent's Tail
- Publication date: 2013
- Publication place: United Kingdom
- Media type: Print
- Pages: 429
- ISBN: 9781846687617
- Dewey Decimal: 782.4208691209421

Sounds Like London: 100 Years of Black Music in the Capital is a 2013 book by the British music journalist and author Lloyd Bradley. The book features contributions by Eddy Grant, Osibisa, Russell Henderson, Dizzee Rascal and Trevor Nelson, with an introduction by Soul2Soul's Jazzie B.

== Synopsis ==
The book details the history of black music, which has been a part of London's musical landscape since World War I. Following Commonwealth immigration to the United Kingdom, the sounds and styles of black music became the foundation of the city's youth culture. The book tells the story of music and the characters making it from "Soho jazz clubs to Brixton blues parties to King's Cross warehouse raves to the streets of Notting Hill".

== Reception ==
In The Independent the book is praised as "not just a fine anthology but also social history" and described as "exceptional" while in the New Statesman the work was described by Bim Adewunmi as "captivating and well crafted". In The Guardian Sukhdev Sandhu criticised the book for missing some subjects, however praised it as "major achievement nonetheless", while Karl Dallas wrote in The Morning Star that the work was "meticulously researched and illustrated' and an "authentic account of black music's capital origins". BBC Radio 4 named Sounds Like London a "Book of the Week" (13–17 August 2013).
