= Trevor Nelson =

British DJ and radio presenter (born 1964)

Trevor Nelson MBE
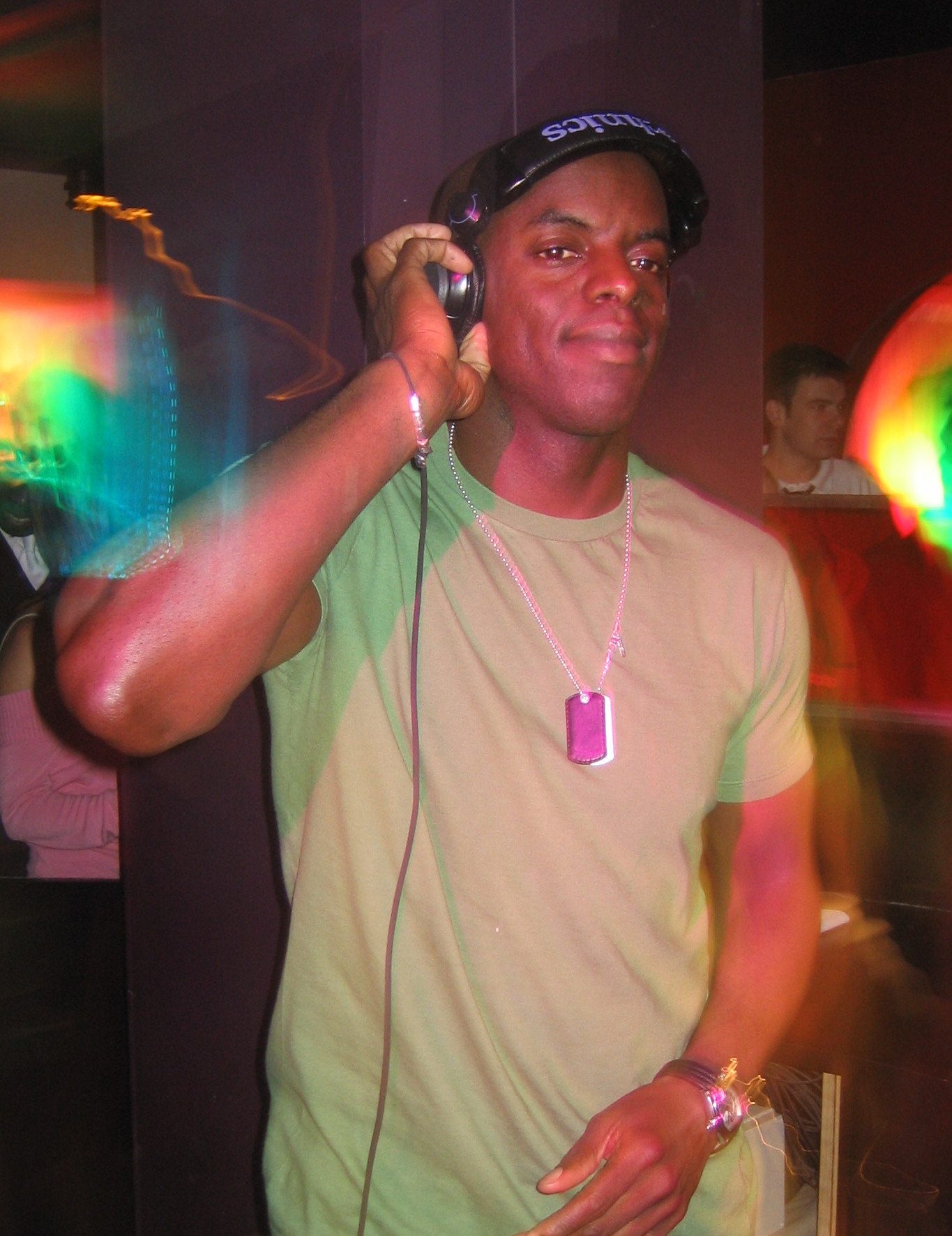
- Nelson in 2004
- Born: 7 January 1964 (age 62); Hackney, London, England
- Children: 2
- Presenting career
- Show: Trevor Nelson
- Station: BBC Radio 1Xtra
- Time slot: 11:00–13:00 (Sunday)
- Show: Trevor Nelson
- Station: BBC Radio 2
- Time slot: 14:00–16:00 (Monday- Wednesday, Friday)
- Style: R&B, soul, hip-hop, dance
- Country: United Kingdom
- Previous shows: BBC Radio 1, Kiss FM
- Website: trevornelson.co.uk

Trevor Ricardo Nelson (born 7 January 1964) is a British DJ and radio presenter. He is best known for presenting a range of shows across BBC Radio.

== Early life ==
Trevor Ricardo Nelson was born on 7 January 1964 in Hackney to a family of St Lucian heritage, Nelson attended Central Foundation Boys' Grammar School (now known as Central Foundation Boys' School) in Cowper Street, Islington, and Westminster Kingsway College. His first job was in a shoe shop, but his love of music meant a part-time role as a DJ.

Nelson found daytime work at a record importer in 1985, and widened his DJ experience putting on "warehouse parties" at the weekends.

Trevor was the club promotions manager for Cooltempo / EMI promoting artists such as Gang Starr and Arrested Development. He went onto become head of A&R and was instrumental in the careers of artists such as D'Angelo, Mica Paris and Lynden David Hall.

== Radio career ==
As a pioneer in the urban music scene, he set up his Madhatter Soul Sound System in the 80s. Nelson started his broadcasting career on the fledgling London's Kiss FM, originally a pirate radio station. Nelson helped the station become legal and gain a licence in 1990. Nelson was both a daytime DJ and director. In 1996, Nelson moved to BBC Radio 1 to present the first ever national R 'n' B show, The Rhythm Nation and a year later began the first ever R&B Chart Show on a Saturday afternoon. Nelson stayed at Radio 1 until 2013.

From 2007 Nelson presented the Breakfast Show on the newly launched BBC Radio 1Xtra and in 2008 launched a weekly soul show on BBC Radio 2 whilst also presenting shows on BBC Radio 1 and BBC Radio 1Xtra.

Nelson previously presented the Live Lounge show weekdays, Monday to Friday 10:00am until 13:00 show on BBC Radio 1Xtra between 2008 and 2016. In November 2016 it was announced that Nelson would be leaving that show on 1Xtra and moving to Saturday and Sundays 4 – 7 pm, showcasing the best in new and old R&B music, with DJ Ace taking over his slot. He had held this slot since 2011 after leaving the 1Xtra breakfast show which he presented with Gemma Cairney and previously Zena McNally.

In 2010 he was awarded with the special gold lifetime achievement award for his services to broadcasting, at the Sony Radio Academy Awards.

On 21 March 2017 he was a presenter for Sara Cox's Red Nose Day danceathon from 2 am to 5 am.

In August 2017, April 2018, and again in August 2018, Trevor sat in for Ken Bruce on his Radio 2 show.

On 29 October 2018 it was announced Sara Cox would take over drivetime on Radio 2. As a result, from January 2019 Trevor Nelson's Rhythm Nation would move to Monday-Thursday 22:00–00:00.

In 2022 Nelson hosted Exodus: Bob Marley Reimagined; the BBC concert took place to mark the 60th anniversary of Jamaican Independence.

On 2 January 2025, he hosted the final Rhythm Nation show on Radio 2, and on 27 January took over the weekday afternoon show 2 to 4pm on BBC Radio 2, replacing Scott Mills who moved to The Radio 2 Breakfast Show.

=== Club career ===
Nelson set up his Madhatter Soul Sound System in the 80s (warehouse) Behind the decks Nelson cut his teeth as a DJ at the Africa Centre with Soul II Soul and promoted numerous club nights such as:

- MTV Lick parties, hosted for five years in the 90s around the UK and Europe.
- 11 Years residency in Global Room nightclub in Pacha, Ibiza.
- Dance Wicked residencies at The Wag Club and Borderline.
- Promoted numerous warehouse parties in the 80s.

Nelson continues to DJ around the UK and Europe. Nelson currently owns and promotes his touring club brand 'Soul Nation' which is popular up and down the country.

=== Television career ===
Nelson first appeared on television in 1998 on MTV UK and presenting The Lick on MTV Base off the back of his first RnB show on Radio 1. He featured on the judging panel for Channel 4 programme Chancers in 2004, and Just the Two of Us in 2006 and 2007.

Nelson has worked on numerous BBC shows that include: Holiday: you call the shots, Trevor Nelson's Urban Choice, The Players club series, and he presented the coverage of the FIFA World Cup concert in South Africa for BBC Two in 2010.

Nelson holds the distinction of being the first black person to appear on Channel 5, appearing at 10:37pm on The Jack Docherty Show.

Nelson regularly appears as a pundit on programmes where celebrities recall their detailed memories of popular culture. He also provided commentary on the 2012 Summer Olympics opening ceremony and 2012 Summer Olympics closing ceremony.

== Personal life ==
MBE ribbon

Nelson is married. They have a son, and he also has a daughter from a previous relationship. Nelson lives in London, and is a fan of Chelsea. He also has a home in Saint Lucia.

He was appointed Member of the Order of the British Empire (MBE) in 2002 for his contribution to the Millennium Volunteers programme.

In June 2026, Nelson announced that he would step back from work commitments due to health issues. Two months later, he said that he had been diagnosed with a brain tumour.

== Awards ==
- Best DJ – MOBO Award 1996, 1997, 1999 and 2008
- 2002 — Honoured an MBE for his work with millennium volunteer
- The Gold Award — Sony Radio Academy Awards 2010
- The Arqiva Hall of Fame 2014
- Best presenter — APAs Awards 2018 and 2019
- Music Magazine Award
- Boisdale DJ Lifetime Achievement Award 2024
- The Ivors Academy Gold Badge — 2019
- ARIA Award — Windrush 75, marked the 75th anniversary of Windrush and celebrated the impact of Caribbean culture on British life

== Compilations ==
Nelson has released nine compilation albums, INCredible Sound of Trevor Nelson, The Soul Nation and Lick compilations. His most recent compilation album is The Trevor Nelson Collection. Picking up where his Lick compilations left off, he shares his favourite R&B, Soul and Rap classics from over the decades.

- 1997 - Nu Classic Soul
- 1999 – INCredible Sound of Trevor Nelson
- 2000 – Trevor Nelson’s Rhythm Nation
- 2003 – Trevor Nelson’s Soul Nation
- 2003 – The Lick: Best of
- 2013 – The Trevor Nelson Collection
- 2014 – The Trevor Nelson Collection 2
- 2015 – The Trevor Nelson Collection 3
- 2016 – Trevor Nelson Club Classics
- 2019 – Soul Selection

== Bibliography ==
- Sounds Like London: 100 Years of Black Music in the Capital, 2013. (Contributor)

Media offices
Preceded by N/A	MTV Africa Music Awards host 2008	Succeeded by Wyclef Jean
