= Super Ape =

Studio album by the Upsetters
- Released: August 1976
- Studios: Black Ark (Kingston, Jamaica)
- Genre: Dub
- Length: 37:37
- Labels: Island, Upsetter
- Producer: Lee Perry

The Upsetters chronology
Revolution Dub (1975)	Super Ape (1976)	Return of the Super Ape (1978)

Lee "Scratch" Perry chronology
Revolution Dub (1975)	Super Ape (1976)	Roast Fish Collie Weed & Corn Bread (1978)

Alternative cover
- Jamaican album cover

Professional ratings
Review scores
Source	Rating
AllMusic	5/5 stars

Super Ape is a dub studio album written, produced and engineered by Lee "Scratch" Perry, credited to his studio band the Upsetters.

In Jamaica, the album was released under the name Scratch the Super Ape in July 1976 on Perry's own Upsetter label. The Jamaican version had a different track order than the international version that was released in August the same year on Island Records.

The album was listed in the 1999 book The Rough Guide: Reggae: 100 Essential CDs.

Super Ape was reissued on November 29, 2013 as Record Store Day Black Friday double vinyl release with three extra tracks: "Rastaman Shuffle", "Magic Touch" and "Corn Fish Dub". Side 4 featured an etching of the Super Ape album cover art.

== Background and production ==
Super Ape was recorded at Perry's Black Ark Studios using four-track equipment. Perry built his productions through repeated overdubbing, combining tracks to free space for additional recordings. His arrangements were often conceived with later versions and mixes already in mind.

The album incorporates vocal fragments by Perry, Prince Jazzbo, George Faith and Max Romeo, alongside material drawn from both previously known and less familiar recordings. Music historian Lloyd Bradley described Super Ape as the culmination of Perry's work at the Black Ark, noting its dense production and its thematic emphasis on Rastafari, righteousness and repatriation.

== Track listing ==
All tracks composed by Lee "Scratch" Perry

=== Side one ===
1. "Zion's Blood"
2. "Croaking Lizard"
3. "Black Vest"
4. "Underground"
5. "Curly Dub"

=== Side two ===
1. "Dread Lion"
2. "Three in One"
3. "Patience"
4. "Dub Along"
5. "Super Ape"

== Personnel ==
- Lee Perry – producer, percussion, conga
- Michael "Mikey Boo" Richards – drums
- Anthony "Benbow" Creary – drums
- Noel "Skully" Simms – conga
- Boris Gardiner – bass
- Earl "Chinna" Smith – guitar
- Keith Sterling – piano
- Bobby Ellis – horns
- "Dirty" Harry Hall – horns
- Herman Marquis – horns
- Vin Gordon – trombone
- Egbert Evans – flute
- Prince Jazzbo – toasting on "Croaking Lizard"
- Barry Llewellyn – backing vocals
- Earl Morgan – backing vocals
- Tony Wright – cover art
