= DIP Presents the Upsetter =

Studio album by Lee Perry
- Released: 1975
- Recorded: 1975
- Genre: Reggae
- Label: DIP
- Producer: Lee Perry

Lee Perry chronology
Double Seven (1974)	DIP Presents the Upsetter (1975)	Musical Bones (1975)

Professional ratings
Review scores
Source	Rating
The Encyclopedia of Popular Music	3/5 stars

DIP Presents the Upsetter is a studio album by the Jamaican musician Lee Perry (also known as "the Upsetter"), released in 1975. It was Perry's first album for the Dip record label, based in Brockley, southeast London. Three of the twelve tracks are performed by Perry's house band the Upsetters, two by the Gaylads, another two by Sam Carty, and the rest by King Burnett, the Gladiators, Leo Graham, the Silvertones and Linval Spencer.

== Track listing ==
=== Side one ===
1. "Enter the Dragon" – The Upsetters
2. "I Don't Mind" – Sam Carty
3. "Cane River Rock" – The Upsetters
4. "I Man Free" – King Burnett
5. "Jamaican Theme" – The Upsetters
6. "Time" – The Gladiators

=== Side two ===
1. "Jump It" – Leo Graham
2. "Live Is a Flower" – Sam Carty
3. "Have Some Fun" – The Gaylads
4. "Nature Man" – The Gaylads
5. "Dub a Pum Pum" – The Silvertones
6. "Fu Kung Man" – Linval Spencer (a.k.a. Linval Thompson)
