= Beyond Race Magazine =

US magazine

- Categories: Music, Culture
- Frequency: Quarterly
- Founder: David Terra
- Founded: 2005
- First issue: Summer 2006
- Company: Verde Media Group Inc. (2010–2013)
- Country: United States
- Based in: New York City
- Language: English
- Website: beyondracemagazine.com (2006–2008), beyondrace.com (2008–2015)
- ISSN: 1944-7701
- OCLC: 237213070

Beyond Race Magazine (often abbreviated to Beyond Race or BRM) is a quarterly magazine based in New York City, founded in 2005 by David Terra, and dedicated to "groundbreaking music and culture". The first issue of Beyond Race was published in the summer of 2006.

On May 18, 20, and 21, 2010, BRM ran benefit shows in order to raise money to continue operating. On November 16, 2010, Verde Media Group Inc. acquired 100% ownership of Beyondrace.com. In 2013, VMGI transferred ownership of Beyond Race Magazine and Beyondrace.com to its editor-in-chief.

It is primarily centered on independent and emerging artists, covering music, film, and other arts, such as literature, graffiti, tattooing, and visual arts. The publication also reports heavily on progressive issues and culture, in general.

Along with in-depth features on musicians and artists, each issue also covers social and political topics and has several pages devoted to album reviews. Past issues have covered Dub Trio, the Beastie Boys, Cevin Soling, Garland Jeffreys, Donnell Rawlings, Hi-Tek, Subatomic Sound System, and Nada Surf.

The magazine has been an active supporter of New York City's diverse arts and music scene. Every year Beyond Race magazine hosts a party for their Music Issue that highlights artists from across the broad spectrum of genres flourishing in the five boroughs from electronic to reggae to hip hop to rock and everything in between. Past bills have included a breadth of artists from Garland Jeffreys to Subatomic Sound System.

The magazine also has a large presence on the internet by maintaining active YouTube and MySpace accounts and regularly updating its website to include exclusive online content, such as interviews, concert and film reviews, and opinion columns.
