= Roast Fish Collie Weed & Corn Bread =

Studio album by Lee Perry
- Released: April 1978
- Studios: Black Ark, Kingston, Jamaica
- Genres: Reggae, dub reggae
- Length: 37:36
- Label: Upsetter
- Producer: Lee Perry

Lee Perry chronology
Super Ape (1976)	Roast Fish Collie Weed & Corn Bread (1978)	Return of the Super Ape (1978)

Professional ratings
Review scores
Source	Rating
AllMusic	5/5 stars

Roast Fish Collie Weed & Corn Bread is a studio album by the Jamaican musician Lee Perry, released in 1978. Although Perry had been in the Jamaican music business for a long time by 1978, this album, produced by himself at his Black Ark studio, was the first to consist entirely of songs sung by himself. The album is very experimental.

Island Records, which had released earlier Lee Perry productions like Super Ape and War Ina Babylon, rejected the album. This angered Perry, and his relationship with the record company deteriorated.

== Track listing ==
Side one

1. "Soul Fire"
2. "Throw Some Water In"
3. "Evil Tongues"
4. "Curly Locks"
5. "Ghetto Sidewalk"

Side two

1. "Favourite Dish"
2. "Big Neck Police"
3. "Free Up the Weed"
4. "Mr. D.J. Man" AKA "Yu Squeeze Ma Panhandle"
5. "Roast Fish & Cornbread"

== Personnel ==
- Lee Perry – vocals, percussion
- Geoffrey Chung – guitar
- Earl "Chinna" Smith – guitar
- Billy Boy – guitar
- Winston Wright – organ
- Boris Gardiner – bass
- Michael "Mickey Boo" Richards – drums
- Sly Dunbar – drums
- Noel "Skully" Simms – percussion
- Full Experience – background vocals
