= Rhythm Shower =

Studio album by the Upsetters
- Released: 1973
- Genre: Reggae
- Length: 35' 59"
- Label: Upsetter
- Producer: Lee Perry

The Upsetters chronology
Cloak and Dagger (1973)	Rhythm Shower (1973)	Upsetters 14 Dub Blackboard Jungle (1973)

Rhythm Shower is a studio album by the Upsetters, released in 1973. Originally released in a very limited Jamaican pressing with no sleeve, it became better known when re-released by the Trojan label as part of its originally 3 LP, later 2-CD set The Upsetter Collection, first issued in 1986.

Many of the rhythms on the album are known as those done by Lee "Scratch" Perry. "Double Power" versions "Give Me Power" by the Stingers, "Lover Version" features Perry's production of Chenley Duffus covering William Bell's "I Forgot to Be Your Lover" (he later gifted the rhythm to Winston "Niney" Holness, who passed it on to producer A Folder who enjoyed massive success with cuts of it by Delroy Wilson, Augustus Pablo, Tommy McCook and Jah Lloyd in 1975 and 1976), "Connection" versions the "Space Flight" rhythm, and "Kuchy Skank" is an Augustus Pablo version to "Words of My Mouth" by Sangie Davis and the Gatherers. "Operation" is an early example of the then-experimental technique of cutting together parts of different backing tracks to create a single track - it opens with a different dub of "Give Me Power", which then segues into a dub of the Ethiopians "Love and Respect", then a dub of Junior Byles "Fever", ending with the bass melodica cut to "Give Me Power", released in its own right on 45 as "Tipper Special".

== Track listing ==
=== Side one ===
1. "Tighten Up" – Dillinger
2. "Django Shoots First" – Sir Lord Comic
3. "Uncle Charley"
4. "Sokup"
5. "Double Power"
6. "Lover Version"

=== Side two ===
1. "Rumpelsteelkin"
2. "Skanking" – Dillinger
3. "Kuchy Skank"
4. "Connection" – Dillinger
5. "Operation"
