= Skinnerbox =

American ska band

- Origin: New York City, New York, United States
- Genres: Ska
- Years active: 1989–1998
- Past members: Chris DeRosa on Drums and Brandt Abner on Keys

Skinnerbox was a third wave ska band formed in New York City in the late 1980s by King Django.

== Discography ==
=== Full Length ===
- Instrumental Conditioning (Stubborn) 1990)
- Now & Then (Stubborn) (1992)
- Tales of the Red (Stubborn) (1993)
- What You Can Do, What You Can't (Moon Ska) (1997)
- Demonstration (Triple Crown Records/Stubborn)(1998)

=== EPs ===
- Sunken Treasure (Stubborn) (1994)

=== 7" Singles ===
- "Does He Love You" b/w "Right Side" (Stubborn) (1993)
- Hepcat Season b/w I Got To Know (Stubborn) (1998)

=== Compilations ===
- Special Wild 1989-1994 (Stubborn) (1996)
