= Return of Django (instrumental) =

Single by the Upsetters

from the album Return of Django
- Released: 1969
- Recorded: 1969
- Genre: Reggae
- Label: Upsetter
- Songwriter(s): Lee Perry
- Producer(s): Lee Perry

"Return of Django" is a 1969 instrumental by the Upsetters, a studio band, led by Lee "Scratch" Perry, who wrote and produced the song. Backed with "Dollar in the Teeth", it made #5 on the UK Singles Chart.

== Use in popular culture ==
- Grand Theft Auto: London 1969 uses both Return of Django and Dollar in the Teeth on one of its stations.
- Return of Django appears in the film This Is England.
- The UK Inland Revenue used this for an advert in 2004.
