= Super Ape Inna Jungle =

Studio album by Lee "Scratch" Perry & Mad Professor
- Released: 1995
- Recorded: 1995
- Genre: Dub; oldschool jungle; trip hop
- Length: 45.00
- Label: DIP
- Producer: Lee "Scratch" Perry

Professional ratings
Review scores
Source	Rating
AllMusic	3/5 stars
The Encyclopedia of Popular Music	3/5 stars
MusicHound World	3.5/5 stars

Super Ape Inna Jungle is an album by Lee "Scratch" Perry and Mad Professor, released in 1995. Perry's biographer David Katz called the album "largely unlistenable ... an opportunistic collection of unused Perry vocals remixed in the hyper-mechanical 'jungle' style then sweeping London".

== Track listing ==
1. "I'm Not a Human Being"
2. "Nasty Spell"
3. "Writing on the Wall"
4. "Why Complaining?"
5. "Thunder And Lightning"
6. "Super Ape Inna Jungle"
7. "Jungle Roots"
8. "Black Spell"
9. "Dancing Boots"
10. "Sheba Dance"
