= King Perry (album) =

Studio album by Lee "Scratch" Perry
- Released: 2 February 2024
- Recorded: 2020–2021
- Genre: Dub; trip hop
- Length: 46:13
- Label: False Idols
- Producer: Daniel Boyle

Lee "Scratch" Perry chronology
Heaven (2023)	King Perry (2024)	Spaceship to Mars (2024)

Singles from King Perry
- 1. "100lbs of Summer" Released: 15 November 2023

King Perry is a studio album by Jamaican reggae vocalist Lee "Scratch" Perry, released on 2 February 2024 through False Idols. The album was preceded by the single "100lbs of Summer" and explores various genres based around dub.

== Reception ==
Bill Pearis of BrooklynVegan "can’t imagine a more fitting send-off than this" with "fantastic guests" on an album that "has a lot of extra love in its grooves" and "that was probably pieced together on a computer from dozens of vocal takes but it doesn’t feel like it, taking care to honor [Perry's] legacy while not being beholden to the past".The Fader listed this among the best releases of the week, where critic Raphael Helfand stated that it works "more like an ellipsis—a slow transition into whatever lies beyond". The Guardian's Dave Simpson rated this release 3 out of 5 stars and praised producer Danny Boyle for being able to replicate "the analogue capabilities of Perry’s legendary Black Ark Studios to bring contemporary electronica to the great man’s inimitable dub rhythms and pronouncements". In Loud and Quiet, Sam Walton rated this album an 8 out of 10 for showing the dual personalities of Perry as an artist with "a sort of bouncy pop reggae full of pep and summery warmth, hi-fi presence and sparkle" as well as one "far darker and more cavernous encompassed by a sort of treacly foreboding". Andrew Perry of Mojo gave this release 4 out of 5 stars.

Editors at Pitchfork shortlisted this among seven albums to listen to for the week and critic Ben Cardew rated this release a 5.9 out of 10, critiquing the production for having "the unfortunate effect of making Perry feel like a guest on his own record, his voice often buried low in the mix, where it battles in vain against ear-rinsing sonics". On Radio New Zealand's The Sampler Tony Stamp called King Perry "a decidedly mixed bag". Writing for Resident Advisor, John-Paul Shriver critiqued that this "posthumous album falls far short of his legacy, muddled by overproduction and unnecessary guest appearances" and that "it's baffling to think that Perry suddenly would have wanted to explore synthwave, drum & bass, big beat and other subgenres". The Scotsman's Fiona Shepherd gave this album 4 out of 5 stars and wrote that this album "honours his signature dub sound while allowing for the influence of various guest vocalists"; she continued to praise the trip hop elements of the music. In Uncut, Louis Pattison scored this release a 5 out of 10, stating that it is "always a pleasure to hear Perry’s whimsical pronouncements on the mic... [b]ut the music is largely uninteresting".

== Track listing ==
1. "100lbs of Summer" (Lee "Scratch" Perry and Aria Wells) – 3:53
2. "Evil Generation" (Perry) – 4:23
3. "Midnight Blues" (Perry and Fifi Rong) – 3:33
4. "King of the Animals" (Perry) – 4:38
5. "Green Banana" (Perry and Shaun Ryder) – 4:02
6. "Jesus Life" (Perry) – 2:46
7. "I Am a Dubby" (Perry and Marta Zlakowska) – 3:40
8. "No Illusion" (Perry) – 3:30
9. "The Person I Am" (Perry and Rose Waite) – 4:00
10. "Jah People in Blue Sky" (Perry and Wells) – 4:03
11. "Future of My Music" (Perry, Adrian Nicholas Matthews Thaws, and Zlakowska) – 4:02
12. "Goodbye" (Perry) – 3:43

== Personnel ==
- Lee "Scratch" Perry – vocals
- Hugo Bechstein – orchestra conducting on "Goodbye"
- Daniel Boyle – production
- Grand Shapes – cover design
- Robert Landen – horns on "The Person I Am", arrangement on "The Person I Am", trumpet on "100 lbs of Summer", arrangement on "100 lbs of Summer"
- Greentea Peng – vocals on "100 lbs of Summer" and "Jah People in Blue Sky"
- Fifi Rong – vocals on "Midnight Blues"
- Shaun Ryder – vocals on "Green Banana"
- Rory Sadler – horns on "The Person I Am", arrangement on "The Person I Am", saxophone on "100 lbs of Summer", arrangement on "100 lbs of Summer"
- Tricky – rapping on "Future of My Music"; additional production on "Midnight Blues", "Jesus Life", "I Am a Dubby", and "Future of My Music"
- Rose Waite – vocals on "The Person I Am"
- Zak Waite – drums on "The Person I Am", additional drum production on "The Person I Am"
- Marta Zlakowska – vocals on "I Am a Dubby" and "Future of My Music"

== Charts ==
Chart performance for King Perry
Chart (2024)	Peak position
UK Independent Albums (OCC)	17

== See also ==
- List of 2024 albums
