= From the Secret Laboratory =

Studio album by Lee "Scratch" Perry
- Released: 1990
- Recorded: 1989
- Genre: Reggae, dub
- Label: Mango
- Producer: Adrian Sherwood, Lee "Scratch" Perry

Lee "Scratch" Perry chronology
Message from Yard (1990)	From the Secret Laboratory (1990)	Satan's Dub (1990)

From the Secret Laboratory is an album by the Jamaican musician Lee "Scratch" Perry, released in 1990. It peaked at No. 8 on Billboard's World Music chart. Despite Perry's pledge to not work again with Island Records, the album was released by Island's subsidiary label Mango.

== Production ==
Recorded and mixed over eight days in England and Jamaica, the album was produced by Adrian Sherwood and Perry. Perry was backed by members of Dub Syndicate, African Head Charge, and the Roots Radics. The album cover photo, by Adrian Boot, was taken in the Swiss Alps. "Party Time" is a cover of the Heptones song. "Vibrate On" was written by Augustus Pablo. "African Hitchhiker" uses a Kumina rhythm.

== Reception ==
Professional ratings
Review scores
Source	Rating
All Music Guide	3/5 stars
Robert Christgau	(3-star Honorable Mention)
The Encyclopedia of Popular Music	3/5 stars
Houston Chronicle	2.5/5 stars
MusicHound World: The Essential Album Guide	3.5/5 stars
Record-Journal	A−
Reggae & Caribbean Music	7/10
(The New) Rolling Stone Album Guide	4/5 stars
Spin Alternative Record Guide	3/10

The Toronto Star said that "Perry delivers deadpan free association raps over a spacey, heavily-echoed reggae backing." The Guardian noted the "surprisingly coherent lyrics." The Manchester Evening News called From the Secret Laboratory a "great album" and labeled Perry "the quintessential reggae producer-as-innovator". The Houston Chronicle said that his "addled, self-promoting ravings have pretty lost whatever bizarre charm they once possessed."

The Independent stated that "for the most part, From the Secret Laboratory is great fun, two old studio hands making benevolent madness in a smoke-filled sound lab." The Record-Journal concluded that "Perry has picked up dust from other cultures, lending a larger dimension to the reggae-base". The Gazette praised the "marvellous, mad reggae connections". The Commercial Appeal opined, "The material is erratic but Perry's propulsive voice keeps things interesting." The State listed From the Secret Laboratory as the best reggae album of 1990.

The titular character of Alan Warner's novel Morvern Callar plays the album on her stereo.

== Track listing ==
No.	Title	Length
1.	"Secret Laboratory (Scientific Dancehall)"
2.	"Inspector Gadget"
3.	"(I Got The) Groove"
4.	"Vibrate On"
5.	"African Hitchhiker"
6.	"You Thought I Was Dead"
7.	"Too Much Money"
8.	"Push, Push"
9.	"African Headcharge in the Hackney Empire"
10.	"Party Time"
11.	"Seven Devils Dead"
