= Spaceship to Mars =

Studio album by Lee "Scratch" Perry
- Released: 30 August 2024
- Length: 1:32:46
- Producer: Youth

Lee "Scratch" Perry chronology
King Perry (2024)	Spaceship to Mars (2024)

Spaceship to Mars is the final studio album by Jamaican reggae vocalist Lee "Scratch" Perry, released on Creation Youth Music in August 2024. The album was produced by Youth, who is credited as a co-writer on all tracks. Perry died during the production of the album. Youth completed production with a group of guest vocalists including Hollie Cook, Boy George, Carroll Thompson, and Durga McBroom.

== Reception ==
Record Collector called the studio album an "ultimate tribute to Scratch’s unique spirit." MOJO ranked Spaceship to Mars #50 on its list of the Best Albums of 2024. Louder than War called the effort a "bustling dub adventure." Silent Radio commented that "each track explodes into life with pieces of studio trickery."

== Track listing ==
1. "Butterfly Sky" (Lee "Scratch" Perry and Youth) – 4:52
2. "Love is War" (Perry and Youth) – 5:05
3. "Love Sunshine Peace" (Perry and Youth) – 5:30
4. "The Lizard" (Perry and Youth) – 5:25
5. "Dr. Love" ((Perry and Youth) – 3:42
6. "Iron Shirt" (Perry and Youth) – 3:32
7. "Spaceship to Mars" (Perry and Youth) – 6:40
8. "Bulldozer Dub" (Perry and Youth) – 6:56
9. "In the Sunshine" (Perry and Youth) – 4:57
10. "Butterfly Sky" (Dub Mix) (Perry and Youth) – 4:50
11. "Love is War" (Dub Mix) (Perry and Youth) – 4:51
12. "Love Sunshine Peace" (Dub Mix) (Perry and Youth) – 5:23
13. "The Lizard" (Dub Mix) (Perry and Youth) – 5:43
14. "Dr Love Revelation Dub" (Perry and Youth) – 3:46
15. "Iron Shirt" (Dub Mix) (Perry and Youth) – 3:39
16. "Spaceship to Mars" (Dub Mix) (Perry and Youth) – 6:31
17. "Bulldozer Dub" (Upsetter Mix) (Perry and Youth) – 6:49
18. "Lessons in Dub" (Perry and Youth) – 4:35

== See also ==
- List of 2024 albums
