= Africa's Blood =

Studio album by Lee Perry
- Released: 1971
- Genre: Reggae, dub
- Length: 39:04
- Label: Trojan
- Producer: Lee Perry

Lee Perry chronology
The Good, the Bad and the Upsetters (1971)	Africa's Blood (1971)	Cloak and Dagger (1973)

Professional ratings
Review scores
Source	Rating
AllMusic	3/5 stars

Africa's Blood is a studio album by Lee Perry, released in 1971.

== Track listing ==
=== Side one ===
1. "Do Your Thing" (Perry), performed by Dave Barker – 3:49
2. "Dream Land" (Perry) – 2:38
3. "Long Sentence" (Perry) – 2:25
4. "Not Guilty" (Perry) – 3:12
5. "Cool and Easy" (Perry) – 2:32
6. "Well Dread Version 3" (Perry), performed by the Upsetters featuring Addis Ababa Children – 2:32
7. "My Girl" (Smokey Robinson/Ronald White) – 3:16

=== Side two ===
1. "Saw Dust" (Perry) – 2:23
2. "Place Called Africa Version 3" (Perry), performed by Winston Prince – 2:51
3. "Isn't It Wrong" (Perry), performed by Lee Perry featuring The Hurricanes – 2:52
4. "Go Slow" (Perry) – 2:58
5. "Bad Luck" (Perry) – 2:49
6. "Move Me" (Perry) – 2:34
7. "Surplus" (Perry) – 2:13
