= Many Moods of the Upsetters =

Many Moods of the Upsetter

Studio album by the Upsetters
- Released: 1970
- Genre: Reggae
- Label: Pama
- Producer: Lee Perry

The Upsetters chronology
Clint Eastwood (1970)	Many Moods of the Upsetter (1970)	Scratch the Upsetter Again (1970)

Many Moods of the Upsetters is a studio album by the Upsetters, released in 1970.

== Track listing ==
=== Side one ===
1. "Exray Vision"
2. "Cant Take It Anymore" – David Isaacs
3. "Soul Stew"
4. "Low Light"
5. "Cloud Nine" – Carl Dawkins
6. "Beware"

=== Side two ===
1. "Serious Joke"
2. "Goosy" – Pat Satchmo
3. "Prove It"
4. "Boss Society" – Pat Satchmo
5. "Mean & Dangerous"
6. "Games People Play"
7. "Extra" (sometimes omitted on UK Pama Economy pressings)
