= Nomadic Wax =

Media production company

Nomadic Wax is an international music, film, and events production company specializing in hip-hop and underground music.

== Background ==
Ben Herson founded Nomadic Wax in 1999, while living in Brooklyn, New York. In the summer of 1999, Herson discovered the local independent hip-hop scene in Senegal and was inspired by the politically and socially conscious lyricism employed by the artists. Nomadic Wax was founded with the stated purpose of aiding artists and musicians who use art as a platform for social and political activism. Nomadic Wax expanded to include an office in Washington DC, run by Creative Director Magee McIlvaine.

== Film and television ==
Nomadic Wax began working with film in 2007, debuted in the film “African Underground: Democracy in Dakar" co-produced with non-profit film company Sol Productions. The film is a feature-length documentary that explores the role of youth hip-hop activism in the 2007 Senegalese elections. On December 11, 2008, “Democracy in Dakar” was screened on LinkTV. In 2009, it was screened on WHUT in Washington DC. Till then, “Democracy in Dakar” has been shown at film festivals and universities internationally.

“Democracy in Haiti” is Nomadic Wax's third documentary project. It follows a variety of young people to examine why Haiti's youth have become so separated from mainstream Haitian society and the democratic system.
