= Dub Take the Voodoo Out of Reggae =

1996 reggae album by Mad Professor

Studio album by Mad Professor
- Released: September 23, 1996
- Genre: Dub
- Label: Ariwa
- Producer: Mad Professor

Mad Professor chronology
Who Put the Voodoo Pon Reggae (1996)	Dub Take the Voodoo Out of Reggae (1996)	Evolution of Dub: Black Liberation Dub, Chapter 3 (1996)

Lee "Scratch" Perry chronology
Who Put The Voodoo Pon Reggae (1996)	Dub Take the Voodoo Out of Reggae (1996)	Dub Fire (1998)

Dub Take the Voodoo Out of Reggae is a studio album by Mad Professor with Lee "Scratch" Perry, released in 1996.

== Critical reception ==
Professional ratings
Review scores
Source	Rating
AllMusic	4.5/5 stars
The Encyclopedia of Popular Music	3/5 stars
(The New) Rolling Stone Album Guide	2/5 stars

The St. Louis Post-Dispatch stated: "Mad Professor makes a fun farrago of Perry's vocals by compressing them, varying their speed, and echoing them in cascades toward the horizon as the drums and bass maintain militancy."

AllMusic wrote that "as insane as Perry normally sounds, being awash in the psychedelic soundwaves of dub suits his raving-madman vocal style even more perfectly."

== Track listing ==
All tracks by Mad Professor

1. "Cheerful Dub" – 3:23
2. "Drummer Boy Dub" – 5:32
3. "Bounce Back Dub" – 3:54
4. "Dub Voodoo" – 3:16
5. "Shadow of Dub" – 3:46
6. "Mystic Powers of Dub" – 4:06
7. "Arkwell Dub" – 3:33
8. "Mr. Dubfire" – 3:43
9. "Dub Connection" – 3:59
10. "Messy Dub Apartment" – 3:21

== Personnel ==
- Mad Professor – vocals, producer, keyboards
- Rob Alton – producer, samples, drums
- Errol "Black Steel" Nicholson – guitar
- Derek Litchmore – bass, keyboards, drums
- William Forde – bass, keyboards
- Patrick Augustus – steel pan
