= Kung Fu Meets the Dragon =

Studio album by the Mighty Upsetter
- Released: 1975
- Genre: Reggae, dub
- Length: 36:22
- Label: DIP
- Producer: Lee Perry

The Mighty Upsetter chronology
Return of Wax (1975)	Kung Fu Meets the Dragon (1975)	Revolution Dub (1975)

Professional ratings
Review scores
Source	Rating
The Encyclopedia of Popular Music	3/5 stars

Kung Fu Meets the Dragon is a studio album by the Mighty Upsetter, released in 1975.

A martial arts-themed project, the album is largely made up of instrumental versions of some of Perry's productions (Roy Shirley's "Hold Them", Linval Thompson's "Kung Fu") and other musical pieces, featuring Perry's trademark use of percussions and production tricks (phasing, dubbing and so on) and talkover inspired by the wave of martial arts movies that were popular at the time of recording.

Recorded at Perry's own Black Ark Recording Studios, it features Jamaican polyinstrumentalist Augustus Pablo on melodica.

Production values similar to the following album Revolution Dub (Perry's subsequent record, reissued in the 1980s on Island Records worldwide).

The album was reissued in 2013 on LP through Secret Records.

== Track listing ==
All tracks composed by Lee "Scratch" Perry, except where indicated.

=== Side one ===
1. "Enter the Dragon" – 2:14
2. "Theme From Hong Kong" – 2:20
3. "Heart of the Dragon" – 3:07
4. "Hold Them Kung Fu" – 3:34
5. "Flames of the Dragon" – 2:45
6. "Scorching Iron" – 2:37

=== Side two ===
1. "Skango" – 3:03
2. "Fungaa" – 3:02
3. "Black Belt" – 2:54
4. "Iron Fist" – 2:25
5. "Kung Fu Man" – 2:44
6. "Black Belt Jones" (Keith Hudson) – 3:12
7. "Exit the Dragon" – 2:25
