= Mad Professor =

British music producer (born 1955)

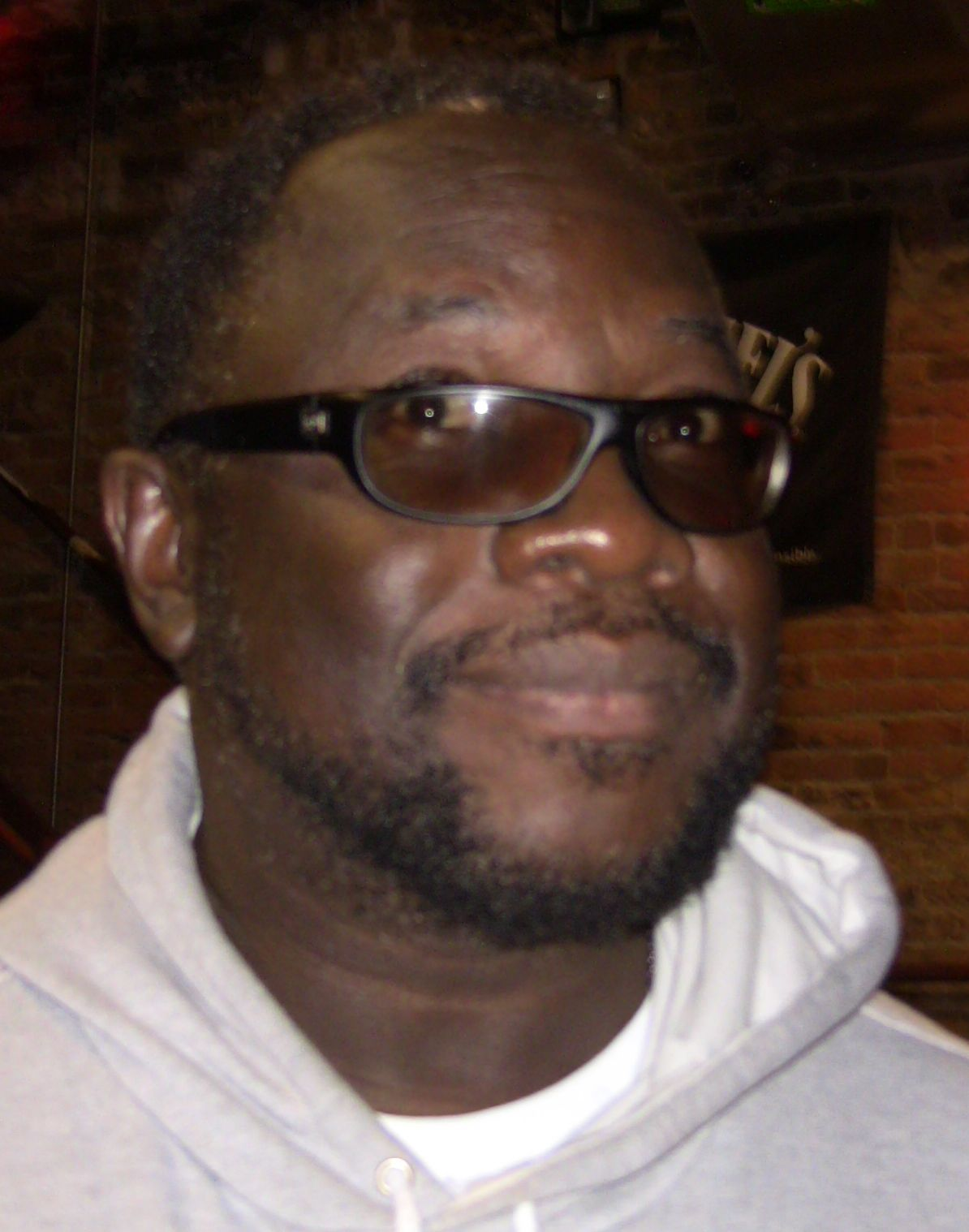
- Mad Professor during a soundcheck at Reggie's Music Place in Chicago

Background information
- Born: Neil Joseph Stephen Fraser; 27 March 1955 (age 71); Georgetown, Guyana
- Genres: Dub; reggae; jungle
- Occupations: Record producer; engineer
- Years active: 1979–present
- Label: Ariwa
- Website: www.ariwa.com

Neil Joseph Stephen Fraser (born 27 March 1955, Georgetown, Guyana) known by his stage-name Mad Professor, is a British dub music producer, engineer and remixer. He has collaborated with reggae artists Lee "Scratch" Perry, Sly and Robbie, Pato Banton, Jah Shaka and Horace Andy, as well as artists outside the realm of traditional reggae and dub, such as Sade, Massive Attack, the Orb, Gaudi, the Brazilian DJ Marcelinho da Lua, Grace Jones, and Perry Farrell.

== Early life ==
Fraser became known as Mad Professor as a boy due to his fascination with electronics. He emigrated from Guyana to London at the age of 13 and later began his music career as a service technician. He gradually collected recording and mixing equipment, and in 1979 opened his own four-track recording studio, Ariwa Sounds, in the living room of his home in Thornton Heath.

== Career ==
Fraser began recording lovers rock bands and vocalists for his own label (including the debut recording by Deborahe Glasgow) and recorded his first album after moving the studio to a new location in Peckham in 1982, equipped with an eight-track setup, later expanding to sixteen. Fraser's Dub Me Crazy series of albums won the support of John Peel, who regularly aired tracks from the albums. Although early releases were not big sellers among reggae buyers, the mid-1980s saw this change with releases from Sandra Cross (Country Life), Johnny Clarke, Peter Culture, Pato Banton, and Macka B (Sign of the Times). Fraser moved again, this time to South Norwood, where he set up what was the largest black-owned studio complex in the UK and recorded lovers rock tracks by Cross, John McLean, and Kofi, and attracted Jamaican artists including Bob Andy and Faybiene Miranda. He teamed up with Lee "Scratch" Perry for the first time in 1983 for the recording of the album Mystic Warrior (1989).

== Recordings ==
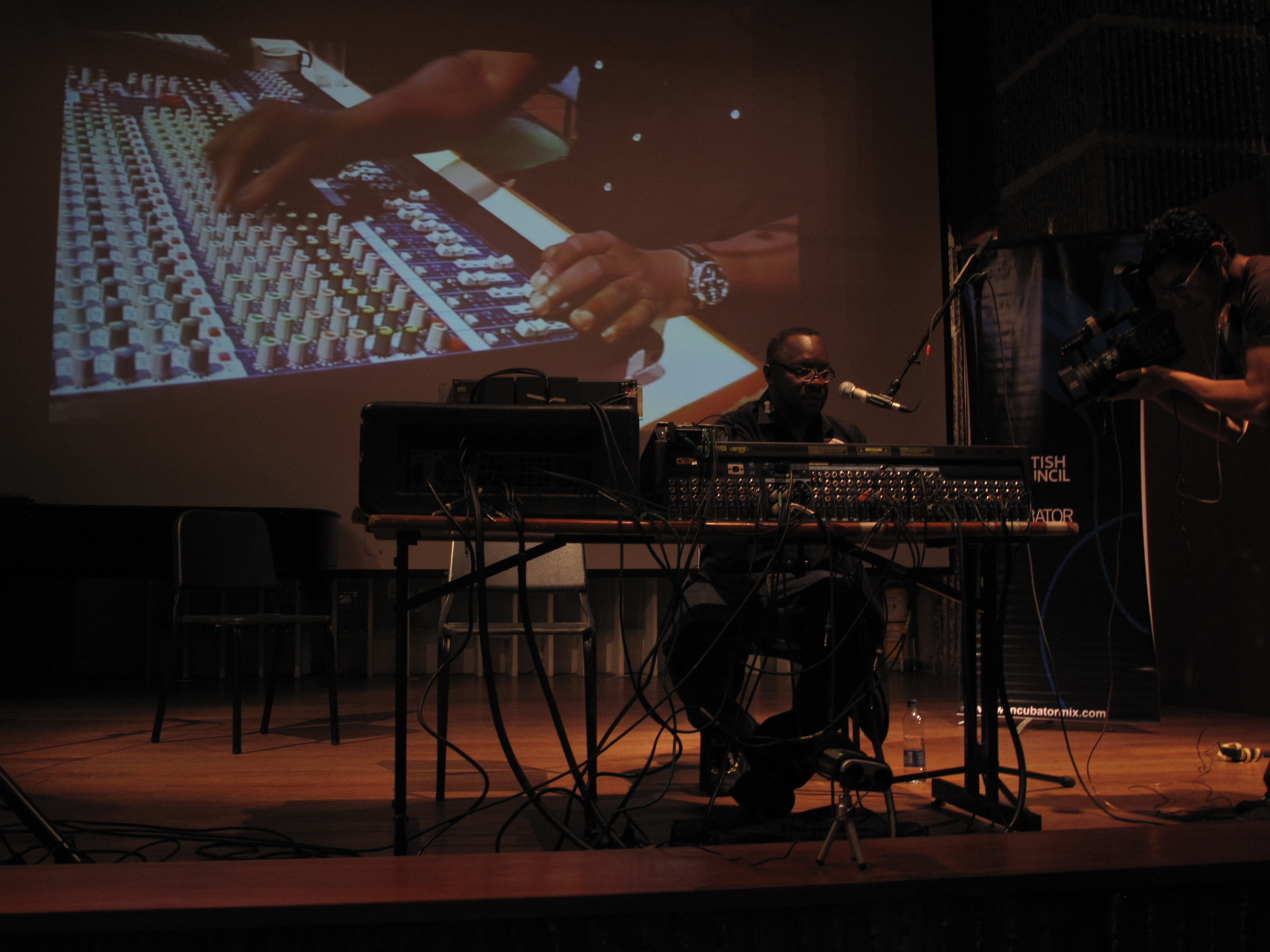
Mad Professor mixing dub and cumbia during a workshop in Bogotá, Colombia

Mad Professor has created 12 instalments of the Dub Me Crazy series and 5 albums under the Black Liberation Dub banner. The following is a partial discography of his original releases including collaborations with other artists and remixes.

=== Original recordings ===
- 1983 – In A Rub A Dub Style
- 1985 – A Caribbean Taste of Technology
- 1992 – True Born African Dub
- 1994 – The Lost Scrolls of Moses
- 1995 – It's A Mad, Mad, Mad, Mad Professor
- 1997 – RAS Portraits
- 2001 – Dubbing You Crazy
- 2001 – Trix in the Mix
- 2005 – Method to the Madness
- 2007 – Dub You Crazy
- 2008 – The Dubs That Time Forgot
- 2009 – Audio Illusions of Dub
- 2012 – The Roots of Dubstep

=== Dub Me Crazy series ===
- 1982 – Dub Me Crazy
- 1982 – Beyond The Realms of Dub (Dub Me Crazy, Pt.2)
- 1983 – The African Connection (Dub Me Crazy, Pt.3)
- 1983 – Escape to the Asylum of Dub (Dub Me Crazy, Pt.4)
- 1985 – Who Knows The Secret of the Master Tape (Dub Me Crazy, Pt.5)
- 1986 – Schizophrenic Dub (Dub Me Crazy, Pt.6)
- 1987 – Adventures of a Dub Sampler (Dub Me Crazy, Pt.7)
- 1988 – Experiments of the Aural Kind (Dub Me Crazy, Pt.8)
- 1989 – Science and the Witchdoctor (Dub Me Crazy, Pt.9)
- 1990 – Psychedelic Dub (Dub Me Crazy, Pt. 10)
- 1992 – Hijacked To Jamaica (Dub Me Crazy, Pt.11)
- 1993 – Dub Maniacs on the Rampage (Dub Me Crazy, Pt.12)
- 2022 – Covid Illusion (Dub Me Crazy, Pt.20-22)

=== Black Liberation series ===
- 1994 – Black Liberation Dub (Chapter 1)
- 1995 – Anti-Racist Dub Broadcast (Black Liberation Chapter 2)
- 1996 – The Evolution of Dub (Black Liberation Chapter 3)
- 1997 – Under The Spell of Dub (Black Liberation Chapter 4)
- 1999 – Afrocentric Dub (Black Liberation Chapter 5)

=== Dub You Crazy With Love Series ===
- 1997 – Dub You Crazy With Love
- 2000 – Dub You Crazy With Love (Part 2)
- 2008 – Bitter Sweet Dub

=== Collaborations ===
==== With Lee "Scratch" Perry ====
- 1990 – Mystic Warrior
- 1995 – Black Ark Experryments
- 1995 – Super Ape Inna Jungle
- 1996 – Experryments at the Grass Roots of Dub
- 1996 – Who Put The Voodoo Pon Reggae
- 1996 – Dub Take the Voodoo Out of Reggae
- 1998 – Live at Maritime Hall
- 1998 – Fire in Dub
- 2000 – Lee Perry Meets Mad Professor
- 2001 – Techno Dub

==== With other artists ====
- 1981 - Kunte Kinte (with Aquizim)
- 1982 – Rhythm Collision Dub (with Ruts DC)
- 1983 – Punky Reggae Party (Positive Style) – Anti Social Workers
- 1984 – Jah Shaka Meets Mad Professor at Ariwa Sounds
- 1985 – Mad Professor Captures Pato Banton
- 1989 – Mad Professor Recaptures Pato Banton
- 1989 – Mad Professor Meets Puls Der Zeit
- 1989 – Mad Professor Feat The Man Ezeke Remix an Dub for Sheila Giles
- 1990 – A Feast of Yellow Dub (with Yellowman)
- 1995 – No Protection (Massive Attack v Mad Professor)
- 1996 – New Decade of Dub (with Jah Shaka)
- 2000 – The Inspirational Sounds of Mad Professor
- 2000 – Marseille London Experience (with Massilia Sound System)
- 2003 – Psychobelly Dance Music (with Baba Zula)
- 2004 – Dub Revolutionaries (with Sly and Robbie)
- 2004 – From The Roots (with Horace Andy)
- 2004 – In A Dubwise Style (with Marcelinho da Lua)
- 2005 – Moroccan Sunrise (with Borrah)
- 2005 – Dancehall Dubs (with Crazy Caribs)
- 2006- Max Romeo Pocomania Songs (with Mad Professor)
- 2009 – Revolution Feat. Pato Banton And Mr. Professor (With Tugg)
- 2009 – Nairobi Meets Mad Professor – Wu Wei
- 2010 – Izrael Meets Mad Professor and Joe Ariwa
- 2010 – Frente Cumbiero Meets Mad Professor
- 2010 – Rewired in Dub (with Pama International)
- 2011 - Rewired in Dub (with Horace Andy)
- 2012 – The Roots of Dubstep
- 2013 – Cedric Congo Meets Mad Professor
- 2014 - Method to the Madness (various Ariwa artists)
- 2017 - In The Midst Of The Storm (Mad Professor Meets Jah9)
- 2019 - Massive Attack vs Mad Professor Part II (Mezzanine Remix Tapes ’98)
- 2019 – Mad Professor meets Gaudi
- 2025 – Mad Professor Meets Youth
- 2026 – EP#1 – Dub Versions (with Sensible Soccers)

=== Remixes ===
Since the 1990s he has remixed tracks by Sade, the Orb, The KLF, Beastie Boys, Jamiroquai, Rancid, Depeche Mode, Perry Farrell and Japanese pop singer Ayumi Hamasaki. In 1995 he produced No Protection, an electronic dub version of Massive Attack's second album, Protection. He has also created a version of I&I for New Zealand reggae band Katchafire, three versions for New Zealand electronic group Salmonella Dub and twelve remixes for Japanese musician Ayumi Hamasaki.

- No Protection – "Dub version of Massive Attack album Protection" (1995)
- Soul Coughing – "Sugar Free Jazz (Multiple Remixes (Most were released on the Sugar Free Jazz: Slash In-House Cassette))" (1995)
- Black Orpheus Dub – Dub version of Black Orpheus for the AIDS-benefit album Red Hot + Rio produced by the Red Hot Organization (1996)
- Urrun Dub – Dub version of Fermin Muguruza's Urrun (1999)
- Salmonella Dub – "For The Love of It" (1999)
- Ayumi Hamasaki – "Who... (Who Dub It?)" from Ayu-mi-x II Version US+EU (2000)
- Ayumi Hamasaki – "key (ARIWA Dub Mix)" from Ayu-mi-x III Non-Stop Mega Mix Version
- Salmonella Dub – "Tui Dub" (2002)
- Ayumi Hamasaki – "Hanabi (Ariwa Dub Mix)" from RMX Works from Ayu-mi-x 5 Non-Stop Mega Mix (2003)
- Salmonella Dub – "Mercy" (2004)
- Miss Kittin – "Happy Violentine (Mad Professor Smiling Orange Dub)" (2005)
- Ayumi Hamasaki – "Happy Ending (Mad Professor Remix)" from Ayu-mi-x 6: Gold (2008)
