= Panic in Babylon =

Studio album by Lee Perry
- Released: 27 September 2004
- Label: Damp
- Producer: Pascal Brunkow, DJ Startrek

Lee Perry chronology
Alien Starman (2003)	Panic in Babylon (2004)	Alive, more than ever (2006)

Professional ratings
Review scores
Source	Rating
AllMusic	4/5 stars

Panic in Babylon is a 2004 studio album by Lee Perry. He was backed by the all-white and all-Swiss White Belly Rats.

== Track listing ==
1. "Rastafari"
2. "Purity Rock"
3. "Pussy Man"
4. "Fight to the Finish"
5. "Voodoo"
6. "Panic in Babylon"
7. "Perry's Ballad"
8. "I am a Psychiatrist"
9. "Inspector Gadget 2004"
10. "Are You Coming Home?"
11. "Baby Krishna"
12. "Greetings"
13. "Devil Dead Live"
