= Return of the Super Ape =

Studio album by the Upsetters
- Released: July 1978
- Studio: Black Ark (Kingston, Jamaica)
- Genre: Dub
- Length: 35:00
- Label: Lion of Judah
- Producer: Lee Perry

The Upsetters chronology
Super Ape (1976)	Return of the Super Ape (1978)

Lee "Scratch" Perry chronology
Roast Fish Collie Weed & Corn Bread (1978)	Return of the Super Ape (1978)	The Return of Pipecock Jackxon (1980)

Professional ratings
Review scores
Source	Rating
AllMusic	3/5 stars

Return of the Super Ape is a reggae studio album produced by Lee "Scratch" Perry, credited to the Upsetters. The album was originally released in Jamaica in 1978 and was the last album by the Upsetters to be released before Perry closed down his Black Ark studio.

The album has been re-released on several different labels. In 1998, it was re-issued by Jet Star with five bonus tracks under a slightly different title, The Original Super Ape. The cover was by Lloyd Robinson.

== Track listing ==
All tracks composed by Lee "Scratch" Perry

Side one

1. "Dyon Anaswa"
2. "Return of the Super Ape"
3. "Tell Me Something Good"
4. "Bird in Hand"
5. "Crab Yars"

Side two

1. "Jah Jah Ah Natty Dread"
2. "Psycha & Trim"
3. "The Lion"
4. "Huzza a Hana"
5. "High Ranking Sammy"
