= Battle of Armagideon (Millionaire Liquidator) =

1986 reggae album by Lee "Scratch" Perry

Studio album by Lee "Scratch" Perry and the Upsetters
- Released: 1986
- Recorded: 1985
- Studios: Thameside (Rotherhithe, London)
- Genres: Reggae, dub
- Length: 43:34
- Label: Trojan
- Producers: Lee "Scratch" Perry, Mark Downie

Lee "Scratch" Perry and the Upsetters chronology
History, Mystery & Prophesy (1984)	Battle of Armagideon (Millionaire Liquidator) (1986)	Time Boom X De Devil Dead (1987)

Battle of Armagideon (Millionaire Liquidator) is a studio album by reggae artist Lee "Scratch" Perry and his backing group at the time, billed as the Upsetters. The album was released in 1986 on Trojan Records. It was re-released on CD in 1988 by Trojan, and on October 9, 2001, on Sanctuary Records.

== Critical reception ==
Professional ratings
Review scores
Source	Rating
AllMusic	3/5 stars
The Encyclopedia of Popular Music	3/5 stars
(The New) Rolling Stone Album Guide	2/5 stars
Spin Alternative Record Guide	9/10

Trouser Press wrote: "A return to form of sorts, the LP is full of his characteristically dense production (which sounds thoroughly contemporary) and lots of cryptic, stream-of-consciousness lyrics." The Spin Alternative Record Guide deemed the album Perry's best of the 1980s.

== Track listing ==
All tracks by Lee "Scratch" Perry

1. "Introducing Myself" – 4:19
2. "Drum Song" – 4:42
3. "Grooving" – 4:41
4. "All Things Are Possible" – 2:33
5. "Show Me That River" – 4:15
6. "Time Marches On (In/Out Mix)" – 0:49
7. "I Am a Madman" – 5:49
8. "The Joker" – 3:37
9. "Happy Birthday" – 5:11
10. "Sexy Lady" – 3:17
11. "Time Marches On" – 4:21

== Personnel ==
The Upsetters

- Lee "Scratch" Perry – vocals, percussion, harmonica
- Mark Downie (Marcus Upbeat) – rhythm guitar/synth
- Tarlok Mann – lead guitar
- Russ Cummings – keyboards
- Marac (Spike) Kolodzinski – bass
- Kenneth (Peng) Smith – drums
- Lloyd Clarke – alto saxophone
- Trevor Jones – trombone

Production

- Produced by Lee "Scratch" Perry; co-produced by Mark "Marcus Upbeat" Downie
- Jerry Tilley – engineer
- Patrick Meads – executive producer
- Mark Downie – cover art
