= The Upsetter =

Studio album by the Upsetters
- Released: November 1969
- Recorded: 1969
- Genre: Rocksteady, reggae
- Label: Trojan
- Producer: Lee Perry

The Upsetters chronology
The Upsetter (1969)	Return of Django (1969)

Professional ratings
Review scores
Source	Rating
AllMusic	4/5 stars

The Upsetter is a studio album of Lee "Scratch" Perry productions, released in 1969. The album largely comprises instrumentals from Perry's studio band the Upsetters, but also features vocal tracks by Busty Brown and the Muskyteers (aka the Silvertones). The album was reissued in expanded form on compact disc in 2003. Its name is a reference to the song of the same name.

== Track listing ==
=== Side one ===
All tracks composed by Lee "Scratch" Perry; except where indicated

1. "Tidal Wave" – The Upsetters
2. "Heat Proof" – The Upsetters
3. "To Love Somebody" (Barry Gibb, Robin Gibb) – Busty Brown
4. "Night Doctor" – The Upsetters
5. "Soulful I" – The Upsetters
6. "Big Noise" – The Upsetters

=== Side two ===
1. "Man from M.I.5" – The Upsetters
2. "Dread Luck" – The Upsetters
3. "Kiddy-O" – The Muskyteers (aka The Silvertones)
4. "Wolf Man" – The Upsetters
5. "Crying About You" – The Upsetters
6. "Thunderball" – The Upsetters
