= Leo Graham =

Jamaican singer

Leo Graham was a Jamaican singer.

He first sang with The Bleechers, then after leaving the group recorded several solo singles in the 1970s including "Perilous Time," "A Win Them" and "Not Giving Up" for Joe Gibbs, and songs including "Big Tongue Busters" for producer Lee "Scratch" Perry. Graham's vocals on Perry's recordings have been described as "quavery", "bleating" and "distinctly rural". Graham's first record with Perry was a song he had written criticizing Obeah religion called "Black Candle."

== Discography ==
- "Black Candle" (Kingston: Justice League, 1973)
- "Doctor Demand"

His son Daweh Congo released an album Militancy in 1997.
