= Return of Wax =

Studio album by the Upsetters
- Released: 1975
- Genre: Reggae
- Length: 34:56
- Label: DIP
- Producer: Lee Perry

The Upsetters chronology
Musical Bones (1975)	Return of Wax (1975)	Kung Fu Meets the Dragon (1975)

Return of Wax is a studio album by the Upsetters, released in 1975. The album was first released as a very limited white label LP. The titles for the tracks first appeared on the 1990s CD issue of the album.

== Track listing ==
=== Side one ===
1. "Last Blood"
2. "Deathly Hands"
3. "Kung Fu Warrior"
4. "Dragon Slayer"
5. "Judgement Day"

=== Side two ===
1. "One Armed Boxer"
2. "Big Boss"
3. "Fists of Vengeance"
4. "Samurai Swordsman"
5. "Final Weapon"
