= Scratch the Upsetter Again =

Studio album by the Upsetters
- Released: February 1970
- Genre: Reggae
- Label: Trojan
- Producer: Lee Perry

The Upsetters chronology
Many Moods of the Upsetters (1970)	Scratch the Upsetter Again (1970)	The Good, the Bad and the Upsetters (1970)

Professional ratings
Review scores
Source	Rating
AllMusic	3.5/5 stars
The Encyclopedia of Popular Music	4/5 stars

Scratch the Upsetter Again is a studio album by the Jamaican reggae band the Upsetters, released in 1970.

== Track listing ==
=== Side one ===
1. "Bad Tooth"
2. "The Dentis"
3. "Outer Space"
4. "One Punch"
5. "Will You Still Love Me" – Dave Barker
6. "Take One"

=== Side two ===
1. "Soul Walk"
2. "I Want to Thank You"
3. "Mule Train" – Count Prince Miller
4. "Touch of Fire"
5. "She Is Gone Again" – Alva Lewis
6. "The Result"
