= Clint Eastwood (album) =

Studio album by the Upsetters
- Released: 1970
- Genre: Reggae
- Label: Pama
- Producer: Lee Perry

The Upsetters chronology
Return of Django (1969)	Clint Eastwood (1970)	Many Moods of the Upsetters (1970)

Clint Eastwood is a reggae album by the Upsetters, named after their 1969 instrumental single "Clint Eastwood".

== Track listing ==
=== Side one ===
1. "Return of the Ugly"
2. "For a Few Dollars More"
3. "Prisoner of Love"
4. "Dry Acid"
5. "Rightful Ruler"
6. "Clint Eastwood"

=== Side two ===
1. "Taste of Killing"
2. "Selassie"
3. "What Is This"
4. "Ain't No Love"
5. "My Mob"
6. "I've Caught You"
