= Dub Maniacs on the Rampage =

1993 reggae album by Mad Professor

Studio album by Mad Professor
- Released: 1993
- Genres: Reggae, dub
- Length: 52:03
- Label: Ariwa
- Producer: Mad Professor

Mad Professor chronology
| Hijacked to Jamaica (1992) | Dub Maniacs on the Rampage (1993) | Black Liberation Dub (1994) |

Professional ratings
Review scores
| Source | Rating |
|---|---|
| AllMusic | 2/5 stars |

Dub Maniacs on the Rampage is a studio album released by Mad Professor. It was released in 1993 on the Ariwa label. This album was the last installment of the original run of Mad Professor's "Dub Me Crazy" series.

== Track listing ==
1. "Dub So Hard" - 4:22
2. "Rampage in L.A." - 3:51
3. "Feelings of Dub" - 4:53
4. "Wake Up Dub" - 4:19
5. "Maniacal Blues" - 3:54
6. "Rue Paganini Dub" - 3:50
7. "Acid Meets Dub in Crystal Palace" - 3:36
8. "Big Ben Gone Wrong" - 4:45
9. "Dub Service" - 4:47
10. "Soledad Brothers" - 3:35
11. "Miles from Wurzburg" - 3:35
12. "Rusty Computor" - 3:06
13. "Freaky Girl" - 3:29

== Personnel ==
The following personnel are credited on the album:

- Errol "Black Steel" Nicholson - bass, guitar, drums, keyboards, voices
- Bousie - guitar
- Susan Cadogan - voices
- Errol the General - guitar, drums
- David "Fluxy" Heywood - drums
- Kate Holmes - flute
- Alan Kingpin - voices
- Mad Professor - voices, producer, mixing
- Leroy "Mafia" Heywood - bass, keyboards
- Dennis Nolan - bass, keyboards, voices
- Carroll Thompson - voices
- William the Conqueror - bass, keyboards
