= Musical Bones =

Studio album by the Upsetters
- Released: 1975
- Recorded: 1975
- Studio: Black Ark (Kingston, Jamaica)
- Genre: Reggae, dub
- Length: 30:09
- Label: Dip
- Producer: Lee Perry

The Upsetters chronology
DIP Presents the Upsetter (1975)	Musical Bones (1975)	Return of Wax (1975)

Musical Bones is a studio album by Vin Gordon and the Upsetters, produced by Lee Perry and released in 1975. It was first released as a white label record.

== Background ==
Musical Bones is almost single mindedly focused on Vin Gordon's extraordinary and emotive trombone playing throughout, with the Upsetters providing the rock solid reggae foundation that allowed Gordon to strut his jazzy improvisatory stuff on. Lee Perry played it very straight as a producer here, his wide and unorthodox production tendencies are fully in check.

== Track listing ==
1. "Coco-Macca"
2. "Fly Away"
3. "The Message"
4. "Licky-Licky"
5. "Labrish"
6. "Quinge-Up"
7. "Raw-Chaw"
8. "5 Cardiff Crescent"
9. "Four of a Kind"
10. "Voodoo Man"

== Personnel ==
- Backing Band – The Upsetters
- Drums – Mikey "Boo" Richards, Anthony "Ben Bow" Creary
- Bass – Boris Gardiner
- Lead Guitar – Earl "Chinna" Smith, Geoffrey Chung
- Organ – Winston Wright
- Horns – Bobby Ellis, Dirty Harry
- Trombone – Vin Gordon
- Percussions – Skully, Lee Perry
