= Cloak & Dagger (The Upsetters album) =

Cloak and Dagger

Studio album by Scratch The Upsetter
- Released: 1973
- Recorded: 1972
- Genres: Dub, reggae
- Length: 38:08
- Label: Rhino Records
- Producer: Lee Perry

Scratch The Upsetter chronology
Africa's Blood (1972)	Cloak and Dagger (1973)	Rhythm Shower (1973)

Cloak and Dagger is a studio album by Scratch The Upsetter, released in 1973. Although Cloak and Dagger has elements of dub, music historian Lloyd Bradley described it as a transitional work between earlier Jamaican instrumental recordings and the development of dub. He argued that its arrangements, instrumentation and mixing techniques helped shape Lee "Scratch" Perry's later dub recordings.

== Track listing ==
=== Jamaican version ===
==== Side one ====
1. "Cloak and Dagger" – Tommy McCook & The Upsetters
2. "Sharp Razor V/S" – The Upsetters
3. "Hail Stone" – Winston Wright & Upsetters
4. "Musical Transplant" – The Upsetters
5. "Liquid Serenade" – Winston Wright & Upsetters
6. "Side Gate" – The Upsetters

==== Side two ====
1. "Iron Claw" – Tommy McCook & Upsetters
2. "V/S Iron Side" – The Upsetters
3. "Rude Walking" – Tommy McCook & The Upsetters
4. "V/S Bad Walking" – The Upsetters
5. "Caveman Skank" – Lee Perry & The Upsetters
6. "Pe-We Special" – The Upsetters

=== UK version ===
==== Side one ====
1. "Cloak and Dagger"
2. "Hail Stone"
3. "Musical Transplant"
4. "Liquid Seranade"
5. "Retail Love"
6. "Creation"

==== Side two ====
1. "Iron Claw"
2. "Rude Walking"
3. "Cave Man Skank"
4. "Pe We Special"
5. "Sunshine Rock"
6. "Wakey Wakey"
