= Vin Gordon =

Jamaican trombone player (born 1949)

- Born: 4 August 1949 (age 76)
- Origin: Kingston, Jamaica
- Genres: Reggae
- Instrument: Trombone

Vin Gordon (a.k.a. Trommie, Don D. Junior or Don Drummond Jr) (born 4 August 1949) is a Jamaican trombone player.

== Biography ==
Gordon grew up in Jones Town, Kingston, Jamaica as one of eight children. He went to Kingston's Catholic Alpha Boys School, where he learned to play trombone and string bass. He began his career in 1964 with The Skatalites. He became the main trombonist of Studio One and he recorded for all major producers of Jamaican music in ska, rocksteady and reggae.

At Studio One Gordon met Lee Perry and played with many reggae artists during the rock steady years. He played on records by B.B. Seaton, The Heptones, Bob Andy and Keith Hudson. From 1965 to 1978 he was Bob Marley's trombonist and performed on albums such as Kaya and Exodus.

One solo album was produced by Lee Perry in 1975 (Musical Bones), which was originally released on Dip in the UK on blank labels in 300 copies only. His landing in England in the 80s influenced a mostly British-born reggae groups as Aswad with songs such as "Warrior Charge" and "Dub Fire". Returning to Jamaica he worked on different recordings. In 1997, he started touring with Justin Hinds, then joined the Wailers and the Skatalites in 2004 until September 2008.

== Discography ==
- Musical Bones (1975), DIP
- Way Over Yonder (1980), Joe Gibbs Music
- Gordon in De Garden (2008)
- Heavenless (2016)
- African Shores (2019)

== Sources ==
Katz, David: People Funny Boy: The Genius of Lee "Scratch" Perry, Edinburgh: Canongate, 2000
