= Return of Django =

Studio album by the Upsetters
- Released: 1969
- Genre: Reggae
- Label: Trojan, Sunspot
- Producer: Lee Perry

The Upsetters chronology
The Upsetter (1969)	Return of Django (1969)	Clint Eastwood (1970)

Professional ratings
Review scores
Source	Rating
AllMusic	3/5 stars

Return of Django is a studio album by the Upsetters, released in 1969. The title is a reference to the 1966 Spaghetti Western Django.

== Track listing ==
All tracks are written by Lee "Scratch" Perry

Side one
No.	Title	Length
1.	"Return of Django"
2.	"Touch of Fire"
3.	"Cold Sweat"
4.	"Drugs and Poison"
5.	"Soulful I"
6.	"Night Doctor"

Side two
No.	Title	Length
1.	"One Punch"
2.	"Eight for Eight"
3.	"Live Injection"
4.	"Man from M.I.5"
5.	"Ten to Twelve"
6.	"Medical Operation"
