= Double Seven =

Studio album by the Upsetters
- Released: 1974
- Studio: Chalk Farm studio, London, England, among other places
- Genre: Reggae
- Length: 39 min.
- Label: Trojan
- Producer: Lee Perry

The Upsetters chronology
| Upsetters 14 Dub Blackboard Jungle (1973) | Double Seven (1974) | DIP Presents the Upsetter (1975) |

Professional ratings
Review scores
| Source | Rating |
|---|---|
| AllMusic | 4/5 stars |
| The Encyclopedia of Popular Music | 3/5 stars |

Double Seven is a studio album by the Upsetters.

== Track listing ==
All tracks composed by Lee Perry; except where indicated

=== Side one ===
1. "Kentucky Skank"
2. "Double Six" – U Roy
3. "Just Enough" (Buddy Mize, Ira Allen) – David Isaacs
4. "In The Iaah"
5. "Jungle Lion"
6. "We Are Neighbours" (Eugene Record, Quinton Joseph) – David Isaacs

=== Side two ===
1. "Soul Man" (Isaac Hayes, David Porter)
2. "Stick Together" – U Roy
3. "High Fashion" – I-Roy
4. "Long Sentence"
5. "Hail Stones"
6. "Ironside"
7. "Cold Weather"
8. "Waap You Waa"
