= The Upsetters =

Jamaican reggae band

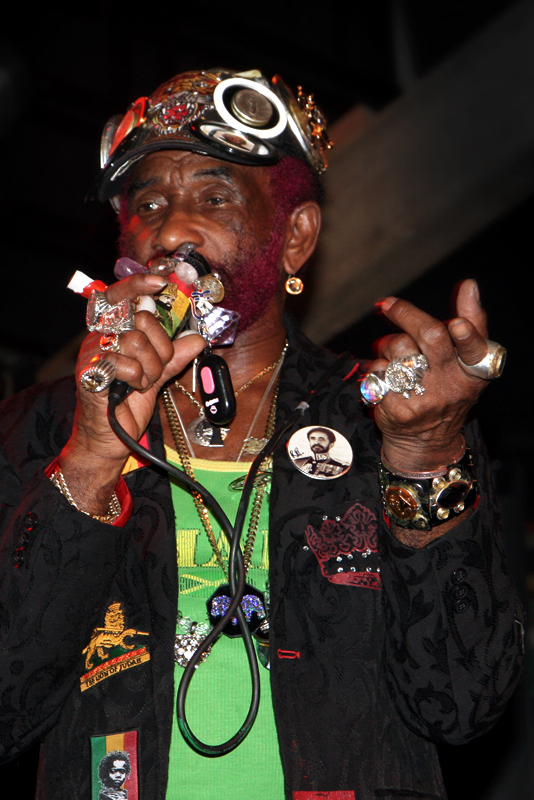
The Mighty Upsetter dub show, Flog, Florence, Italy, 2009

The Upsetters were the house band for Jamaican reggae producer Lee "Scratch" Perry. The name of the band comes from Perry's nickname of Upsetter, after his song "I Am the Upsetter", a musical dismissal of his former boss Coxsone Dodd.

== History ==
The Upsetters were originally Gladdy's All-Stars, led by pianist Gladstone Anderson, and they recorded the international hits "Live Injection" and "Return of Django". The double A-side release of "Return of Django" / "Dollar in the Teeth", peaked at No. 5 in the UK Singles Chart in November 1969. When other commitments prevented the All Stars from participating, another band named the Hippy Boys were recruited to do the subsequent tour in the United Kingdom. This line-up remained the studio band that is most associated with the name, going on to eventually form the nucleus of Bob Marley's backing band the Wailers.

The band included guitarist Alva Lewis, organist Glen Adams and brothers Aston "Family Man" Barrett and Carlton Barrett, on bass guitar and drums respectively. Under Lee "Scratch" Perry's direction, the band backed Bob Marley on a full-time basis, especially on the albums Soul Rebels and Soul Revolution Part II.

By 1972 the Barrett brothers had joined the Wailers and Scratch brought in other musicians to replace them. The main Black Ark Upsetters became Boris Gardiner (bass), Mikey "Boo" Richards, Sly Dunbar, Lloyd "Tinleg" Adams, Clevie Browne and Anthony "Benbow" Creary (drums), Hux Brown and Earl "Chinna" Smith (guitar), Winston Wright and Keith Sterling (keyboards).

== Discography ==
Albums

- The Upsetter (1969)
- Return of Django (1969)
- Clint Eastwood (1970)
- Many Moods of the Upsetters (1970)
- Scratch the Upsetter Again (1970)
- The Good, the Bad and the Upsetters (1970)
- Eastwood Rides Again (1970)
- Upsetters 14 Dub Blackboard Jungle (1973)
- Double Seven (1974)
- Musical Bones (1975)
- Return of Wax (1975)
- Revolution Dub (1975) [credited as Lee Perry & the Upsetters]
- Super Ape (1976)
- Return of the Super Ape (1978)
- Battle of Armagideon (Millionaire Liquidator) (1986) [credited as Mr. Lee 'Scratch' Perry and the Upsetters]

Contributing artist

- The Rough Guide to Dub (2005, World Music Network)
- Junior Murvin: Police and Thieves (1977)
- Max Romeo & the Upsetters: War Ina Babylon (1976)
- The Heptones: Party Time (1977)
- Dave Barker meets The Upsetters: Prisoner of Love (1970)
- Full Experience: Full Experience (1990)
