= Upsetters 14 Dub Blackboard Jungle =

Black Board Jungle

Studio album by Upsetters 14 Dub
- Released: 1973
- Genre: Dub
- Length: 44:17
- Label: Upsetter
- Producer: Lee Perry

Upsetters 14 Dub chronology
Rhythm Shower (1973)	Black Board Jungle (1973)	Double Seven (1974)

Black Board Jungle, often called Blackboard Jungle Dub, is a studio album by the Upsetters. The album, originally released in 1973 under artist name "Upsetters 14 Dub", was pressed in only 300 copies and issued only in Jamaica.

According to Pauline Morrison, this was the first ever dub album that came out, although there is a lot of speculation on the subject. Nevertheless, this was the first stereo dub album, as well as the first to include reverb. Later pressings released as Blackboard Jungle Dub have a different track listing. The album was re-issued as a 3x 10-inch colored vinyl box set as part of Record Store Day in April 2012.

== Track listing ==
=== Side one ===
1. "Black Panta"
2. "V/S Panta Rock"
3. "Khasha Macka"
4. "Elephant Rock"
5. "African Skank"
6. "Dreamland Skank" – The Wailers
7. "Jungle Jim"

=== Side two ===
1. "Drum Rock"
2. "Dub Organizer" – Dillinger
3. "Lovers Skank"
4. "Mooving Skank" – The Wailers
5. "Apeman Skank"
6. "Jungle Fever"
7. "Kaya Skank" – The Wailers

== Personnel ==
- Drums – Lloyd "Tin Legs" Adams, Carly Barrett, Anthony "Benbow" Creary, Leroy "Horsemouth" Wallace
- Bass – Family Man, Lloyd Parks, Errol "Bagga" Walker
- Guitar – Alva Lewis, Valentine "Tony" Chin, Anthony "Sangie" Davis, Barrington Daley
- Organ – Glen Adams, Winston Wright, Bernard "Touter" Harvey
- Piano – Gladstone "Gladdy" Anderson, Tommy McCook
- Melodica – Augustus Pablo
- Trombone – Ronald Wilson
- Trumpet – Bobby Ellis
- Percussion – Noel "Skully" Simms, Uziah "Sticky" Thompson, Lee Perry
- Engineers – Lee Perry, King Tubby
