= Aura Lewis =

Aura Msimang (Lewis)
- Born: Aurelia Msimang; 4 March 1947; Western Native Township, Johannesburg, South Africa
- Died: 28 December 2015 (aged 68)
- Genres: Reggae, jazz
- Years active: Mid-1970s–2015
- Labels: Blue Moon

Aura Msimang (Aura Lewis) (4 March 1947 – 28 December 2015), born Aurelia Msimang, was a South African singer who worked with Bob Marley and Jimmy Cliff and recorded an album with Lee "Scratch" Perry in the late 1970s.

== Early life and career ==
She was born Aurelia Msimang in Western Native Township, Johannesburg, South Africa on 4 March 1947.

After growing up in Johannesburg, she moved to the United States in the early 1970s and enrolled at New York's Hunter College. She married a jazz musician and became known as Aura Lewis. She became interested in reggae after seeing The Wailers perform at Max's Kansas City in 1972, and moved to Jamaica in 1976 where she enrolled in the Drama department of the Jamaica School of Arts, and began working with Cedric Brooks in the group United Africa. She was introduced to Jimmy Cliff, who asked her to join him on his 1977 West African tour as a backing vocalist, the tour filmed and released on video as Bongo Man. Cliff's band stopped off in London before returning to Jamaica, where she was taken to Island Records by Cliff, while Lee Perry and Bob Marley were working on "Punky Reggae Party" (released on Bob Marley & the Wailers' Exodus album). Perry was looking for an additional backing vocalist and asked Lewis to contribute to the recording, joining Candy MacKenzie.

== Full Experience ==
Back in Jamaica, Lewis became a regular backing vocalist for Perry at his Black Ark studio, and began working on a group project called Full Experience, along with another Black Ark session singer, Pamela Reed. Perry agreed to produce an album by the group, and drafted in Candy MacKenzie to make the group up to a trio. They recorded eleven tracks in 1978 with a backing band including Mikey "Boo" Richards, Winston Wright, Geoffrey Chung, Michael Chung, and Sticky, including a version of Nina Simone's "Young Gifted and Black", retitled "Young, Gifted and Broke", and the track "Full Experience" (originally called "Stricly Roots"), which featured Boris Gardiner on bass guitar. The tracks recorded also featured versions of the Swahili songs "Malaika" and "Haposamane". The album was never issued in Jamaica, amid tensions between band members and Perry's partner Pauline Morrison, and Perry's increasingly erratic behaviour, which would lead to the destruction of his studio, and eventually Lewis asked Jimmy Cliff to help her buy the master tapes from Perry. Cliff and Perry came to a deal, but then Cliff issued singles by another group under the Full Experience name on his Sunpower label in 1978, and refused to give Lewis the master tapes. Eventually, Lewis was able to obtain a tape containing five tracks from the sessions and these were licensed to the French Blue Moon label, and released in 1990. The album sleeve features an image of Lewis superimposed on a photograph of the outside of the Black Ark studio. "Full Experience" was included on the album Baffling Smoke Signal: The Upsetter Shop Volume 3 in 2002.

== Later career ==
Lewis left Jamaica and joined the Malopoets and a South African jazz group featuring Louis Moholo, and went on to work with Mory Kante and Maxime Le Forestier after becoming based in Paris where she recorded with Tony Coe in Les voix d'Itxassou.

While in Paris she started a project which would allow her to move back to South Africa where she worked in community development. On her arrival in Johannesburg she became involved in forming a non-profit organisation called Reggae Vision which was meant to uplift and promote reggae artists while organising scarce gigs and events for the rasta community. Aura would get backing from the group Tidal Waves and many others reggae practitioners around the suburb of Yeoville in Johannesburg.

From 1994 to 1996 she stayed in Belgium and was one of the singers of the Tsjaka reggae band.

In 2006 she was invited to perform in Brazil with her band and upon her return continued to develop her album, Afrikan Child, which was to be her last body of work. Working from Base II Base Studios in Yeoville she assembled a group of young producers and beatmakers to contribute to the album. The album was named Afrikan Child because she had made these collaborations with her children. Initially the production was started by the in house producers namely, DOC, Julius, Tebogo "Vambos", Sakhele Maphuthi and Milandru Mapengo who eventually took over the production of six of the tracks on the album. Paul Brown a producer from London, UK contributed a track entitled, Magic In Your Eyes, where the band recorded the entire song and sent the record for Aura Msimang to add her vocals.

Afrikan Child was released in 2010 on digital outlets. The album did not fare well due to poor mixing which was handled by dancehall producers in the UK.

== Death ==
On 28 December 2015, Aura Lewis died.

== Discography ==
=== Albums ===
- Full Experience: Aura Meets Lee "Scratch" Perry at Black Ark Studio (1990) Blue Moon
- Itshe (2000) Aura Msimang
- Afrikan Child (2010) Aura Msimang

=== Singles ===
- "Azania"
