= Lloyd Bradley =

British music journalist and author (born 1955)

- Born: 21 January 1955 (age 71); London, England
- Occupations: Journalist and author
- Notable work: Sounds Like London: 100 Years of Black Music in the Capital (2013)
- Website: www.lloydbradley.net

Lloyd Bradley (born 21 January 1955) is a British music journalist and author, whose books include 2013's Sounds Like London: 100 Years of Black Music in the Capital.

== Biography ==
Born in London, England, to recent immigrants from St Kitts, Bradley discovered Jamaican music during his teenage years, while going out in the North London-based sound systems and created his own, named "Dark Star System", in the late 1970s.

He worked on several magazines in their early years, including Q and Empire for Emap Metro, and launched Big! for the same company. Together with Mat Snow, Bradley developed Maxim for Dennis Publishing, and worked on the launch of Encore magazine in 1994 for Haymarket. He then joined GQ as an editor, moving in 2003 to US company Rodale as an editorial consultant on Men's Health and Runner's World magazines.

Bradley has worked as a freelance journalist and consultant for many titles. His journalistic contributions have been published in NME, Black Music magazine, The Guardian and Mojo, among other publications. He is also working on a biography of George Clinton.

Bradley's Bass Culture (2001) is a book on reggae music. He was associate producer of the BBC2 series Reggae: The Story of Jamaican Music. His 2013 book, Sounds Like London: 100 Years of Black Music in the Capital, received positive review coverage, described in The Independent as an "exceptional work [that] can sit proudly beside the author's earlier Bass Culture: When Reggae Was King, the definitive account of the glory days of the Jamaican music industry."

Bradley is also a classically trained chef, who divides his time between London and Florida.

== Bibliography ==
- Rock Year Book Vol. 9, Virgin Books, 1988. ISBN 0-86369-278-8
- Rock Yearbook, St Martin's Press, UK, 1989. ISBN 0-312-02134-8
- With Gary Glitter, Leader: The Autobiography of Gary Glitter, London: Ebury Press, 1991, ISBN 978-0852239773
- Soul on CD: The Essential Guide, 1994, Kyle Cathie Ltd, UK, ISBN 1-85626-162-X
- Reggae on CD: The Essential Guide, first edition, Trafalgar Square Publishing, UK, 1996, ISBN 1-85626-177-8
- Rod Stewart: Every Picture Tells a Story, London Bridge, UK, 1999. ISBN 1-85410-657-0
- Reggae: The Story of Jamaican Music, photographs by Dennis Morris, BBC Books, UK, 2001. ISBN 0-563-48807-7
- Bass Culture: When Reggae Was King, Penguin Books Ltd, UK, 2001. ISBN 0-14-023763-1. Different editions:
  - USA: This Is Reggae Music: The Story of Jamaica's Music, Grove Press, USA, 2001. ISBN 0-8021-3828-4
  - France: Bass Culture: Quand le Reggae était roi, translation Manuel Rabasse, 2005, Editions Allia, France. ISBN 2-84485-174-6
  - Germany: Bass Culture Der Siegeszug des Reggae, Hanibal. ISBN 3-85445-209-8
  - Japan: Bass Culture, Shinko. ISBN 978-4-401-63145-2
  - Italy: Bass Culture: La Musica dalla Giamaica: ska, rocksteady, roots reggae, dub & dancehall, Shake Edizioni. ISBN 978-88-88865-68-3
  - Spain: Bass Culture: La historia del reggae, translation Tomás González Cobos. Acuarela & A. Machado, Spain. ISBN 978-84-7774-217-3
- The Rough Guide To Running, Rough Guide, 2007. ISBN 978-1-84353-909-4
- The Rough Guide to Men's Health, Rough Guide, 2009. ISBN 978-1-84836-004-4
- Sounds Like London: 100 Years of Black Music in the Capital, London: Serpent's Tail, 2013. ISBN 978-1846687617
- With Ian Wright, A Life in Football: My Autobiography, London: Constable, 2016, ISBN 978-1472123589
- With Marcia Barrett, Forward: My Life With and Without Boney M., Constable, 2018, ISBN 978-1472124425
