= Red Sea (Augustus Pablo album) =

Studio album by Augustus Pablo
- Released: 1998
- Recorded: 1970–1973
- Studio: Randy's, Kingston, Jamaica
- Genre: Reggae, dub
- Label: Aquarius
- Producer: Herman Chin Loy

Augustus Pablo chronology
Red Sea (1998)	This Is...Augustus Pablo (1973)

Professional ratings
Review scores
Source	Rating
AllMusic	2.5/5 stars

Red Sea is an album by Augustus Pablo released in 1998, containing material recorded between 1970 and 1973 and produced by Herman Chin Loy. The music on the album is among the earliest instances of Pablo's revolutionary use of the melodica as a viable musical instrument. Chin Loy is often credited as being an influential figure in the discovery and nurturing of Pablo's talent.

== Track listing ==
1. "Red Sea" (Swaby)
2. "Iggy" (Swaby)
3. "East of the River Nile" (Swaby)
4. "Soul Vibration" (Swaby)
5. "Song of the East" (Swaby)
6. "Uganda" (Swaby)
7. "Youth Man" (Swaby)
8. "Invasion" (Swaby)
9. "I Man" (Swaby)
10. "African Rock" (Swaby)
11. "African Zulu" (Swaby)
12. "405" (Swaby)
13. "Reggae in the Fields" (Swaby)
14. "Darker Shade of Red" (Swaby)

== Personnel ==
- Augustus Pablo – keyboards, melodica
- Uziah "Sticky" Thompson – drums
- Aston Barrett – bass guitar, guitar
- Clive Chin – percussion
- Carlton "Santa" Davis – drums
- Ranchie McLean – guitar
- Herman Chin Loy – backing vocals
- Val Douglas – bass guitar
- Mikey Richards – drums
- Alva Lewis – guitar
- Ranford "Ranny" Williams – guitar
- Mikey Chung – guitar
- Glen Adams – keyboards
- Lloyd Charmers – keyboards
- Geoffrey Chung – keyboards
- Bobby Ellis – trumpet
- Vin Gordon – trombone
- Tommy McCook – saxophone
