= Carl Malcolm =

Jamaican reggae singer and percussionist (born 1952)

- Born: 18 July 1952 (age 74); Black River, St. Elizabeth, Jamaica
- Genres: Ska, rocksteady, reggae, roots reggae,dub music
- Instruments: Vocals, drums
- Years active: 1965–present

Carl Malcolm (born 18 July 1952) is a Jamaican reggae and conscious roots singer and percussionist.

== Biography ==
Malcolm initially learned the keyboard, picking up skills on the instrument at his local Methodist church. He attended St. Elizabeth Technical High School before moving to Kingston, where he worked for a shoe company and was a reservist in the Jamaica Defence Force. In 1965 he joined his first group, The Volcanoes, alongside Al Brown, the pair staying together until 1969. Malcolm then gave up music while he continued his studies, but returned when he joined the group Big Relations, led by Sister Mary Ignatius Davies of Alpha Boys' School protege, the trumpet & flugelhorn player, Jo Jo Bennett. Malcolm recorded briefly as a solo artist, recording the social consciousness-aware liberation tune, Father Free Us, with Cedric Brooks versioning Satta on the 'b' side, for Clement "Coxsone" Dodd's Studio One label, before spending time in the United States.

On his return to Jamaica he was employed by Rupie Edwards as the branch manager of the Success Records store at Half Way Tree. In 1972, Malcolm began working with Rupie Edwards as his producer, releasing a soulful, early reggae ‘self-reliance’ tune, entitled “Make It When You Try”. He continued recording, releasing the 1973 Clive Chin production No Jestering (also versioned by Augustus Pablo, Big Youth and Pablove Black ), and the follow-up on Randy Chin's Impact! record label, Miss Wire Waist, which topped the UK reggae chart when it was issued there in 1975, backed by Lloyd Parks' Skin, Flesh and Bones band, who later became The Revolutionaries (Miss Wire Waist was versioned much later in the 1990s as a digital lovers rock discomix by Scotty (reggae vocalist) and Mafia & Fluxy, produced by Tapper Zukie's brother, "Blackbeard" Sinclair and The Ring Craft Posse.)

In 1975, he released “Reaction”, an introspective tune on the Impact! label, cut with Skin Flesh and Bones. In the same year, Malcolm had his greatest success, with Fattie Bum-Bum. This was picked up for release by independent label UK Records after Dave Cash started to play it on his Capital Radio programme, and it quickly got to number 2 on the station's 'Hitline' listeners' chart. It eventually reached number 8 on the UK Singles Chart. It remained in the chart for eight weeks. The track was written by Malcolm and produced by Clive Chin, son of Randy Chin. It had been copied in a cover version by UK group The Diversions (a band featuring New wave music chanteuse Lene Lovich) on Gull, which also charted (reaching #34), diverting some sales away from Malcolm's version. It was also covered in 1976 by Finnish band, Musakatit. Although this was Malcolm's only mainstream chart success, his vocal and dub discomix records made a significant impact on the reggae charts in 1977 with his releases Repatriation ( aka True Born African) and Take a Tip From Me, both recorded with Ranking Trevor for King Sounds' Grove Music conscious roots reggae record label, securing his reputation with the Lloyd Coxsone and Jah Shaka sound system followers of the time.

In 1997, adapting to stylistic genre changes in the reggae world, Carl Malcolm released a spiritually-focused digital-roots discomix, "Jah Soon Come", on the Danny Soldier Records label out of America.

Carl Malcolm is also a percussionist and drummer, whose Rockers, One drop rhythm and Steppers styles can be heard on The Melodians' Swing & Dine, Pat Kelly's Butterflies ( 'B'-Side to Johnny Osbourne's "Long Long Life"), and on "God Son" Glen Brown's album, The Way to Mt. Zion.

== See also ==
- Fatty Boom Boom
