= Once Upon a Time in the West (soundtrack) =

Once Upon a Time in the West: The Original Soundtrack Recording

Soundtrack album by Ennio Morricone
- Released: 1972
- Genre: Contemporary classical
- Length: 38:23
- Label: RCA
- Producer: Ennio Morricone

Professional ratings
Review scores
Source	Rating
AllMusic	4/5 stars

Once Upon a Time in the West: The Original Soundtrack Recording is a soundtrack composed by Ennio Morricone, from the 1968 western film of the same name directed by Sergio Leone, released in 1972. The film score sold about 10 million copies worldwide.

The soundtrack features leitmotifs that relate to each of the main characters of the film (each with their own theme music), as well as to the spirit of the American West. The theme music for Jill McBain, Claudia Cardinale's character, has wordless vocals by Italian singer Edda Dell'Orso.

It was Leone's desire to have the music available and played during filming. Leone had Morricone compose the score before shooting started and would play the music in the background for the actors on set.

In 2018, for the 50th anniversary of the film, the Italian records company "Beat Records" released a limited 500 copies edition.

In 2020, in a retrospective on CineAction, Mark Lager wrote that "Morricone’s music in Once Upon a Time in the West and The Great Silence is magnificent in its melodic splendor and its revolutionary textures."

== Track listing ==
=== Original release ===
1. "Once Upon a Time in the West" – 3:46
2. "As a Judgment" – 3:08
3. "Farewell to Cheyenne" – 2:40
4. "The Transgression" – 4:43
5. "The First Tavern" – 1:41
6. "The Second Tavern" - 1:34
7. "Man with a Harmonica" – 3:31
8. "A Dimly Lit Room" – 5:09
9. "Bad Orchestra" – 2:25
10. "The Man" – 1:03
11. "Jill's America" – 2:48
12. "Death Rattle" – 1:45
13. "Finale" – 4:13

=== Expanded edition ===
An expanded and remastered album was released in Italy in November 2005.

1. "Once Upon a Time in the West" - 3:43
2. "The Man" - 1:03
3. "The Grand Massacre" - 2:40
4. "Arrival at the Station" - 0:55
5. "Bad Orchestra" - 2:25
6. "Jill's America" - 2:47
7. "Harmonica" - 2:27
8. "The First Tavern" - 1:39
9. "A Bed Too Large" - 1:32
10. "Jill" - 1:47
11. "Frank" - 1:52
12. "Cheyenne" - 1:16
13. "The Second Tavern" - 1:33
14. "The Third Tavern" - 1:19
15. "Epilogue" - 1:14
16. "On the Roof of the Train" - 1:19
17. "Man with a Harmonica" - 3:30
18. "A Dimly Lit Room" - 5:08
19. "The Transgression" - 4:41
20. "Return to the Train" - 0:40
21. "Morton" - 1:36
22. "As a Judgment" - 3:08
23. "Final Duel" - 3:35
24. "Death Rattle" - 1:44
25. "Birth of a City" - 4:25
26. "Farewell to Cheyenne" - 2:38
27. "Finale" - 4:08

== Sampling and covers ==
Bill Frisell played "Once Upon a Time in the West (Theme)", "As a Judgement" and "Farewell to Cheyenne" on his 2016 When You Wish Upon A Star album.

The track "Man with a Harmonica" was sampled by Beats International for their record "Dub Be Good to Me" (released in January 1990) and by The Orb for their record "Little Fluffy Clouds" (released in November 1990). Claude Challe in his album Sun played a remix of "Man with a Harmonica" in CD 2 Lovely Sunset (released in 2001). The track "Man with a Harmonica" as well as quotes from the film was sampled by Colourbox in their song "Looks Like We're Shy One Horse" from their Colourbox album. The German punk band Die Toten Hosen covered "Man with a Harmonica" under the title "Spiel mir das Lied vom Tod" on their 1984 album Unter falscher Flagge.

The British goth rock band Fields of the Nephilim covered "Man with a Harmonica" under the title "Intro (The Harmonica Man)" in their debut album Dawnrazor, in 1987.

British band Muse have played "Man with a Harmonica" as an introduction to their song Knights of Cydonia regularly during live performances.

== Certifications and sales ==
Region	Certification	Certified units/sales
Canada	—	110,000
France (SNEP)	2× Gold	300,000
Netherlands (NVPI)	Platinum	800,000
