= Deliver Me From My Enemies =

- 1977 Grove Music cover

Studio album by Yabby You
- Released: 1977
- Studio: Channel One
- Genre: Roots reggae
- Label: Grove Music, Blood and Fire
- Producer: Vivian Jackson

Yabby You chronology
King Tubby Meets Vivian Jackson (1976)	Deliver Me From My Enemies (1977)	Beware Dub (1978)

Deliver Me From My Enemies is the third album by Jamaican musician Yabby You. It was released on record label Grove Music in 1977, and reissued with an expanded track listing by Blood and Fire in 2006.

== Background and release ==
Deliver Me From My Enemies was recorded, like Yabby You's first two albums Conquering Lion and King Tubby Meets Vivian Jackson, at Channel One Studios in Kingston.

The album was released in 1977 on Grove Music; Linton Kwesi Johnson wrote the liner notes. In 2006 record label Blood and Fire reissued Deliver Me From My Enemies with seven additional tracks on the track listing. The label had previously reissued Yabby You's first two albums.

== Critical reception ==
Professional ratings
Review scores
Source	Rating
AllMusic	4.5/5 stars
The Encyclopedia of Popular Music	3/5 stars
Pitchfork	7.8/10

Deliver Me From My Enemies has been reviewed positively by critics, but is considered weaker than Yabby You's first two albums. Joe Tangari of Pitchfork wrote that "it's clear that Yabby was getting a bit restless, as it's the least consistently fundamentalist of the three".

In a review for AllMusic, Jo-Ann Greene wrote that "Deliver Me from My Enemies, would, in any other hands, be considered a classic. Not quite up to the extreme scintillating heights of its predecessors, however, this album is considered less crucial." The Rough Guide to Reggae said that "the quality slips a little with Yabby's third album, though four tracks – "Deliver Me From My Enemies", "Judgement Time", "Blood Ago Run Down King Street" and "Zion Gate" – are vintage Yabby You".

The title track of the album is based on Psalm 143. Jo-Ann Greene called the track "one of You's most forceful performances". The single release of the track was described by David Katz as "Yabby in evolutionary mode",, and had a dub version of the track as a B-side, which was included in the 2006 album reissue.

== Track listing ==
1977 Grove Music release track listing
No.	Title	Length
1.	"Deliver Me From My Enemies"
2.	"Judgement Time"
3.	"Blood A Go Run Down King Street"
4.	"Love in Zimba"
5.	"Zion Gate"
6.	"Lonely Me"
7.	"Stranger in Love"
8.	"Pound Get a Blow"
9.	"Pick the Beam"
10.	"And Amlak (One God)"

2006 Blood & Fire reissue track listing
No.	Title	Artist	Length
1.	"Deliver Me From My Enemies"		2:42
2.	"Deliver Me From My Enemies (version)"		2:59
3.	"Judgement Time"		3:09
4.	"Blood Ago Run Down King Street"		2:27
5.	"Love in Zimba"		3:20
6.	"Zion Gate"		3:06
7.	"Lonely Me"		3:21
8.	"Stranger in Love"		3:46
9.	"Pound Get a Blow"		2:22
10.	"Pick the Beam"		3:04
11.	"And Amlak (One God)"		2:05
12.	"Jah Vengeance (12" mix)"	Yabby You & Trinity	5:36
13.	"Free Africa (12" mix)"	Yabby You & Trinity	6:23
14.	"Babylon A Fall (12" mix)"	The Prophets	5:56
15.	"Falling Babylon (12" mix)"	Tony Tuff	5:56
16.	"Pick The Beam"		3:06
17.	"Pick The Beam (version)"		3:06

== Personnel ==
- Vivian Jackson – vocals, writing, production
- Robbie Shakespeare – bass
- Sly Dunbar – drums
- Earl "Chinna" Smith, Clinton Fearon – lead guitar
- Ansel Collins – organ
- Noel "Scully" Simms – percussion
- Bernard "Touter" Harvey – piano
- Albert Griffiths, Alrick Forbes – rhythm guitar
- Tommy McCook – saxophone, flute
- Vin Gordon – trombone
- Bobby Ellis – trumpet
