= Rockers Meets King Tubby in a Firehouse =

Rockers Meets King Tubbys in a Firehouse

Studio album by Augustus Pablo
- Released: 1980
- Recorded: 1980
- Studio: King Tubby's, Kingston, Jamaica
- Genre: Dub
- Label: Yard 43100, Walboomer's Music
- Producer: King Tubby, Augustus Pablo

Augustus Pablo chronology
| Original Rockers (1979) | Rockers Meets King Tubbys in a Firehouse (1980) | Earth's Rightful Ruler (1983) |

Rockers Meets King Tubbys in a Firehouse is a dub studio album by Augustus Pablo and King Tubby, released in 1980. It was recorded at King Tubby's studio. "Fire House" is a reference to the Waterhouse section of Kingston, Jamaica, where King Tubby's studio was located. The album features Mickey "Boo" Richards, Leroy Wallace and Albert Malawi on drums, Robbie Shakespeare on bass guitar, and Earl "Chinna" Smith on guitar. The backing band is credited as the Rocking All Stars. Pablo produced the album and played piano, organ and melodica. Prince Jammy also made contributions to this album but goes uncredited.

The album has been released on several different labels, often with slightly different track lists.

== Critical reception ==
Professional ratings
Review scores
| Source | Rating |
|---|---|
| AllMusic | 4/5 stars |
| The Encyclopedia of Popular Music | 3/5 stars |
| MusicHound World | 3.5/5 stars |
| The New Rolling Stone Record Guide | 4/5 stars |
| Spin Alternative Record Guide | 7/10 |

Ken Tucker, in Rock of Ages: The Rolling Stone History of Rock & Roll, called the album "every bit as inventive and lively as [Pablo's] early, acclaimed albums."

== Track listing ==
Side one

1. "Rockers Meet King Tubbys in a Firehouse" – 4:02
2. "Short Man Dub" – 3:17
3. "Zion Is a Home" – 4:35
4. "Dub in a Matthews Lane Arena" – 3:32

Side two

1. "Jah Says Dub" – 3:53
2. "Son of Jah Dub" – 3:38
3. "Simeon Tradition" – 3:20
4. "Selassie I Dub" – 3:49
5. "Jah Moulty Ital Sip" – 2:48

2003 CD reissue bonus tracks

10. "Son of Man Dub" – 4:02
11. "Rasta to the Hills" – 4:04
12. "Twin Seal Dub" – 2:35
13. "House of Dub Version" – 4:23

== Personnel ==
- Augustus Pablo – melodica, piano, clavinet, organ, producer
- Robbie Shakespeare – bass
- Junior Dan – bass
- Michael Taylor – bass
- Bugsy – bass
- Mikey "Boo" Richards – drums
- Albert Malawi – drums
- Leroy "Horsemouth" Wallace – drums
- Earl "Chinna" Smith – guitar
- Dalton Brownie – guitar
- Fazal Prendergast – guitar
- Cleon – guitar
- "Deadley" Headley Bennett – trumpet
- Jah Levi – percussion
- Jah Teo Benjamin – percussion
- Uziah "Sticky" Thompson – percussion
