= Earth's Rightful Ruler =

Earth Rightful Ruler

Studio album by Augustus Pablo
- Released: 1982
- Recorded: Harry J/Channel One, Kingston, Jamaica
- Genre: Reggae
- Label: Message
- Producer: Augustus Pablo

Augustus Pablo chronology
Rockers Meets King Tubby in a Firehouse (1980)	Earth Rightful Ruler (1982)	King David's Melody (1983)

Professional ratings
Review scores
Source	Rating
Allmusic	4.5/5 stars
The Encyclopedia of Popular Music	3/5 stars
MusicHound World	3/5 stars
Spin Alternative Record Guide	7/10

Earth Rightful Ruler (sometimes also sold as Earth's Rightful Ruler or Earth Rightful Ruler: Emperor Haile Selassie I) is a reggae studio album by Augustus Pablo, originally released in 1982 on Message Records.

It features vocals from Hugh Mundell, Robbie Shakespeare on bass guitar, and Earl "Chinna" Smith on guitar. Pablo produced the album and played melodica, piano, organ and steel strings.

It was recorded at both Harry J and Channel One Studios in Kingston, Jamaica and mixed at Harry J's.

The title of the album is in reference to Haile Selassie I, the former Emperor of Ethiopia and a messianic figure to Rastafarians.

== Track listing ==
1. "Earth Rightful Ruler" (H. Swaby)
2. "King Alpha and Queen Omega" (H. Swaby)
3. "Jah Love Endureth" (H. Swaby)
4. "Rastafari Tradition" (H. Swaby)
5. "Zion Hill" (H. Swaby)
6. "Java" (H. Swaby)
7. "Lightning and Thunder" (H. Swaby)
8. "Israel Schoolyard" (H Swaby)
9. "City of David" (H Swaby)
10. "Musical Changes" (Adapted)

== Personnel ==
- Augustus Pablo – keyboards, melodica, piano, steel strings
- Hugh Mundell – vocals
- Delroy Williams, Hugh Mundell, Norris Reid, Maxie Lynch – backing vocals
- Albert Malawi, Lincoln "Style" Scott, Santa Davis, Horsemouth Wallace – drums
- Lloyd "Jah Bunny" Donaldson, Robbie Shakespeare, Junior Dan, Flabba Holt – bass guitar
- Fazal Prendergast, Earl "Chinna" Smith, Bingy Bunny – guitar
- Sidney Wolf, Ras Menilik Dacosta, Teo Benjamin, Garth Swaby – percussion
- Steele – piano
- Sylvan Morris and Stanley "Barnabas" Bryan – Mixing Engineer
