= Conquering Lion (album) =

Studio album by Yabby You & The Prophets
- Released: 1975
- Studios: Dynamic Sounds, Black Ark, Channel One
- Genre: roots reggae
- Length: 30:14
- Labels: Prophet, Lucky
- Producer: Vivian Jackson

Yabby You chronology
Conquering Lion (1975)	King Tubby Meets Vivian Jackson (1976)

UK release (Ram-A-Dam) cover

Conquering Lion is the debut album by Jamaican musician Yabby You (Vivian Jackson) and his backing group The Prophets. It was released in 1975 on Jackson's label Prophets. In the UK the album was released in 1975 under the title Ramadam or Ram-A-Dam, and had a different track listing.

== Background and release ==
Yabby You is the moniker of Vivian Jackson, born in Kingston in 1946. He initially formed a vocal trio with Alaric Forbes and Bobby Melody to record the song "Conquering Lion", which was released as a single in 1972, attributed to Vivian Jackson & the Ralph Brothers. The song begins with a refrain of "be you, yabby yabby you", which Jackson heard sung by angelic voices during a thunderstorm. Jackson's nickname "Yabby You" comes from the song, and was popularised by King Tubby.

The track "Love Thy Neighbour" was also released a single around the same time, attributed to Vivian Jackson & the Deffenders. Both singles sold well enough that Jackson was able to start his own label, Prophets, in 1974. The album Conquering Lion is mostly composed of singles that Jackson released on that label. It was released in 1975 on Jackson's label.

In 2021 Pressure Sounds reissued the album on CD and LP, with 12 bonus tracks of dub versions.

== Critical reception ==
Professional ratings
Review scores
Source	Rating
AllMusic	5/5 stars
The Encyclopedia of Popular Music	4/5 stars

Nathan Bush of AllMusic rated Conquering Lion 5/5 stars, indicating their opinion that the album has "stood the test of time and has become an important and very meaningful recording within its genre." Writing for The Guardian, David Katz called the album "stunningly intense".

== Legacy ==
Versions of title track "Conquering Lion" were recorded by Big Youth ("Yabby Youth"), Augustus Pablo ("False Dread"), Dicky Burton ("God Is Watching You"), and Horace Andy ("Undivided World").

== Track listing ==
All tracks are written by Vivian Jackson.

Conquering Lion track listing
No.	Title	Length
1.	"Run Come Rally"	03:18
2.	"Jah Vengeance"	02:49
3.	"Conquering Lion"	03:26
4.	"Covetous Men"	02:59
5.	"Anti Christ"	02:41
6.	"Carnal Mind"	03:06
7.	"Jah Love"	02:26
8.	"Love Thy Neighbour"	03:36
9.	"Love Of Jah"	03:05
10.	"The Man Who Does The Work"	02:43
Total length:		30:14

All additional tracks from the Expanded Edition are written by Yabby You & King Tubby, except where noted.

2021 Expanded Edition Dub Tracks
No.	Title	Writer(s)	Track being dubbed	Length
11.	"Rally Dub"		"Run Come Rally"	03:19
12.	"Hungering Dub"		"Run Come Rally"	03:36
13.	"Tubby's Vengeance"		"Jah Vengeance"	02:58
14.	"Version Dub"		"Jah Vengeance"	02:38
15.	"Conquering Dub"	Yabby You	"Conquering Lion"	02:41
16.	"Big Youth Fights Against Capitalist"	Yabby You & Big Youth	"Conquering Lion"	03:08
17.	"Anti Christ Rock"		"Anti Christ"	02:55
18.	"Jah Love Dub"		"Jah Love"	03:07
19.	"Warning Version"		"Jah Love"	03:01
20.	"Love Thy Neighbour Version"		"Love Thy Neighbour"	03:35
21.	"Love of Jah Version"		"Love of Jah"	02:59
22.	"Work Without Pay Version"		"The Man Who Does The Work"	02:43
Total length:				37:24

The first UK release of the album was called Ram-A-Dam and had a different track listing.

Ram-A-Dam track listing
No.	Title	Length
1.	"Beyond the hills" (featuring vocals from Cleopatra Williams, Tony Brevett)
2.	"Conquering Lion"
3.	"Regular Rock"
4.	"Work without Pay"
5.	"Covetiousness"
6.	"Jah Love"
7.	"Dem-a-Wolf"
8.	"Rally Round Jahovah"
9.	"Carnal Mind"
10.	"Jah Vengeance"

== Personnel ==
The Prophets

- Vivian Jackson – lead vocals, arrangements, writing, production
- Alaric Forbes – vocals
- Bobby Melody – vocals

Other credits

- Leroy Wallace (Horsemouth) – drums
- Tommy McCook – flute
- Earl "Chinna" Smith, Earl Lindo – guitar
- Aston Barrett – organ
- Bingy Bunny – percussion
- Augustus Pablo, Pablo Black – piano
- Dirty Harry – saxophone
- Don D. Junior – trombone
- Bobby Ellis – trumpet

Technical

- Vivian Jackson – production
- King Tubby – mixing

Artistic

- Cogil Leghorn – artwork, design
- Shirley Chang – colour consultant
- Diggory Kenrick – sleeve notes
