= King David's Melody =

Compilation album by Augustus Pablo
- Released: 1983
- Recorded: 1975–1982
- Studios: Harry J, Kingston, Jamaica; King Tubby's, Kingston, Jamaica
- Genre: Reggae
- Label: Rockers
- Producer: Augustus Pablo

Augustus Pablo chronology
Earth's Rightful Ruler (1982)	King David's Melody (1983)	Rising Sun (1986)

Professional ratings
Review scores
Source	Rating
AllMusic	3.5/5 stars
The Encyclopedia of Popular Music	3/5 stars

King David's Melody is a reggae compilation album by Augustus Pablo, originally released in 1983 on his Rockers record label. It is a collection of singles recorded between 1975 and 1982 for the Rockers and Message record labels.

It features Robbie Shakespeare on bass guitar, Earl "Chinna" Smith on guitar and Horsemouth Wallace on drums. Pablo produced the album and played melodica, piano, organ, xylophone and string synthesizer. The songs were both recorded and mixed at Harry J and King Tubby's studios in Kingston, Jamaica.

Much like the previous album, Earth's Rightful Ruler, the title of this album is in reference to Haile Selassie I, the former Emperor of Ethiopia and a figure who many Rastafarians believe was a descendant of King David, the ancient King of Israel.

A 2006 release by Shanachie Records featured three added bonus tracks.

== Track listing ==
Side one

1. "King David's Melody"
2. "Zion High"
3. "Mr Bassie"
4. "Rastafari Tradition"
5. "West Abyssinia"
6. "Israel in Harmony"

Side two

1. "Rockers Mood"
2. "Sufferers Trod"
3. "Revelation Time"
4. "Selfish Youths"
5. "Corner Stone Dub"
6. "Kent Road"

Bonus tracks featured on 2006 Shanachie release

1. "Hot Milk (Extended Version)"
2. "Freedom Step"
3. "Jah Strength Ital Step"

== Personnel ==
- Augustus Pablo – keyboards, melodica, piano, organ, xylophone and string synthesizer
- Albert Malawi, Anthony "Benbow" Creary, Horsemouth Wallace – drums
- Leroy Sibbles, Robbie Shakespeare, Junior Dan, Michael Taylor, Bunny Jeffery, Fazal Prendergast – bass guitar
- Fazal Prendergast, Earl "Chinna" Smith, Clive Jeffery – guitar
- Teo Benjamin – percussion
- Sylvan Morris and the Professor – mixing engineer
