= Hugh Mundell =

Jamaican reggae singer (1962–1983)

- Also known as: The Blessed Youth, Jah Levi
- Born: 14 June 1962; Kingston, Jamaica
- Died: 14 October 1983 (aged 21) Kingston, Jamaica
- Genres: Reggae
- Occupations: Singer, songwriter
- Years active: 1975–1983

Hugh Mundell (14 June 1962 – 14 October 1983) was a Jamaican roots reggae singer.

== Biography ==
Mundell was born the fourth child and only boy to Theresa and Alvin Mundell. Alvin Mundell was a successful lawyer. He attended St. Margaret's Preparatory School, Kingsway Preparatory School and the Ardenne High School before pursuing a career in music. Most thought that Mundell would become an athlete because he was known to be a competitive runner and routinely participated in street running races with other neighbourhood youth. Mundell grew up just houses away from three other youth who would also go on to become reggae singers: Winston McAnuff, Earl Sixteen Daley, and Yabby You protogé Wayne Wade. Mundell was introduced to reggae by singer and producer Boris Gardiner who was a friend of the family. Mundell was at Joe Gibbs' studio the day that Winston McAnuff recorded the song "Malcolm X." Joe Gibbs offered Mundell the opportunity to record and they laid down a track titled "Where Is Natty Dread?" The track was never pressed to vinyl. It was at Gibbs' studio that he met musician, arranger and producer Augustus Pablo. Mundell explains in his November 1980 interview with Sounds magazine's Edwin Pouncey (also known as artist Savage Pencil):

"I did one recording for Joe Gibbs for Errol Thompson Records which was not released called 'Where Is Natty Dread' and one day I was at the studio and Augustus Pablo saw me at the Joe Gibbs session 'cos he used to run around and check it out y'know. And he asked me to come and do some recordings for him so I said 'Yeah!' So I went by his house and started rehearsing and he create the rhythms. The following Saturday we went to the studio where we recorded my first two songs for release called 'Africa Must Be Free' and 'My, My'".

Between 1976 and 1978 Mundell and Pablo laid the tracks for what would ultimately become Mundell's debut LP Africa Must Be Free By 1983. Produced by Augustus Pablo, Mundell wrote every song on the record. It included two Black Ark-recorded titles: "Let's All Unite" and "Why Do Black Man Fuss & Fight", both supervised and mixed by Lee Perry. The album received five stars from Rolling Stone magazine and was included in Tom Moon's 2008 book, 1000 Recordings to Hear Before You Die. He was a major influence on Junior Reid, who was three years younger, and Mundell was the first to record Reid. He also kept a close friendship with Reid's friend Lacksley Castell, who like Reid, hailed from Waterhouse, Kingston.

Mundell recorded several 12" Rockers Discomix singles under the alias Jah Levi.

Hugh Mundell only performed publicly several times throughout his career. While he may have performed a number of shows in Jamaica and the UK, only the following shows have been confirmed:

- Mundell performed at the Organization of African Unity (OAU) 14th anniversary show on Wednesday, 25 May 1977 at the Queens Theatre in Kingston. Also on the bill were the Twelve Tribes of Israel Players composed of Junior Dan on bass, Sangie Davis on guitar, Albert Malawi on drums, and Pablo Black on keys; and Generation Gap, which included a very young Wycliffe "Steely" Johnson on keys and Dalton Brownie on guitar. Many of the players at this event were the same musicians who play on Mundell's [Africa Must Be Free By 1983. They were also part of the Rockers All-Stars, who played on Augustus Pablo's productions.
- 29 October 1979, Ward Theatre, Kingston, JA w/Augustus Pablo, Junior Delgado, Dave Robinson, Tallawah Dancers, Tivoli High School Dancers, Horace Andy, Little Junior, Jaba Tate, Shaolin Kid. The show was backed by the Seventh Extension and the Roots International Band.
- June 1980, Bermuda. Hugh performed on a ferry boat cruise. Mundell stayed in the apartment of Bermudian Rastafarian soccer legend Cyril "Dago" Steede while in Bermuda.
- 20 October 1980, Palais Des Arts, Paris, France with Brimstone
- 12 December 1980, London Theatre, London, UK with Aswad (cancelled)
- 17 February 1981, Top Rank Suite, Dale End, Birmingham w/ sound systems Sir Coxsone, Fatman, Studio City, Quaker City.
- 17 March 1981, Hammersmith Palais, London, UK with Matumbi, Tribesmen, Brimstone, and Bumble & The Bees. Mundell cancels just days before the show. It is rescheduled for 6 April 1981.
- 6 April 1981, Hammersmith Palais, London, UK with Matumbi, Tribesmen, Brimstone, and Bumble & The Bees.
- July 1981, The Stone, San Francisco.
- 4 October 1981, Reggae Sunblast Festival, Greek Theatre, Berkeley, California. Also on the bill are Judy Mowatt, Marcia Griffiths, Joe Higgs, The Wailers Band, and Wailing Souls.
- Mundell appeared in the Bay area in December 1981 where he played a reggae roots festival along with Wailing Souls, Raskidus, Joe Higgs & Unity, and Uprising at the Oakland Auditorium on 11 December and the Japan Center Theater on 12 December.
- 30 May 1982, Keystone, Berkeley, California, backed by I-DREN, an all-Jamaican band hailing from the bay-area.

In reviewing Mundell's performance in the local city paper, music journalist Bruce Dancis wrote the following:

"Nineteen year old Jamaican singer Hugh Mundell, backed by Ras Kidus Roots Connection, contributed a brief set that was marred by the fact that he was obviously feeling the effects of a cold. This was a disappointment, because the angelically voiced singer possesses one of the purest voices in popular music. Ironically, in Mundell’s prior Berkeley appearance this past July, his glorious vocals were impeded by poor communication with his support band; this time around, Mundell and the band were more connected, but the singer’s illness prevented him from launching into the spirited performance of which he is capable".

In addition to performing live as a reggae artist, Mundell also performed live as Jah Levi throughout Jamaica on the island sound system circuit with Barrington Levy, Burro Banton, Ranking Toyan, Junior Reid, and Elfigo Barker (Volcano Hi-Fi). He also performed for Noel Harper's Killamanjaro Sound System with artists including Super Cat, John Wayne, Dirty Harry, Junior Reid, Madoo, Hopeton James, Puddy Roots, and Major Manzie. There is existing audio of Mundell performing on the sound system circuit on two occasions. In August 1983, Mundell, along with Junior Reid, represented Killamanjaro at Whitehall Avenue, Kingston. With selector Ainsley on the turntable, Mundell and Reid did several numbers, Mundell versioning "Reasons" and Reid voicing the "Some Guys" standard. On 7 September 1983, Mundell and Junior Reid represented Volcano Sound at Cassava Piece, Constant Spring, Kingston. With Volcano's selector Danny Dread at the controls, Mundell and Reid spar over the "Diseases" riddim before they perform the "Betcha By Golly Wow" standard. Mundell also performs his song "Great Tribulation".

Mundell was shot to death on 14 October 1983 while sitting in his vehicle on Grant's Pen Avenue, Kingston, Jamaica. Also in the car were Mundell's wife in the passenger seat and Junior Reid, who was sitting in the back seat. Reid survived the assault and spoke in great detail about it in a 1985 interview with The Beat's Roger Steffens.

At the time of his death, Mundell had recorded five LPs and numerous singles.

== Trial and conviction of Ricardo Codrington for the murder of Mundell ==
On 22 November 1985, Mr. Justice Downer sentenced 25-year-old Ricardo Codrington, labourer of Above Rocks, St. Andrew, to ten years imprisonment at hard labour for the murder of Hugh Mundell. The sentencing occurred after a Home Circuit Court found Codrigan guilty of manslaughter, arising out of the fatal shooting of Mundell on 13 October 1983. Codrington was charged with murder, but the jury convicted him of the lesser offense. The judge said Codrington had already served two years and that was taken into account when sentencing him.
