= King Tubbys Meets Rockers Uptown =

Studio album by Augustus Pablo
- Released: 1976
- Recorded: 1972–1975
- Studios: Randy's, Kingston, Jamaica; King Tubby's, Kingston 11, Jamaica
- Genres: Dub; reggae
- Length: 31:26
- Labels: Yard International; Clocktower
- Producer: Horace Swaby

Augustus Pablo chronology
Ital Dub (1974)	King Tubbys Meets Rockers Uptown (1976)	East of the River Nile (1977)

Singles from King Tubbys Meets Rockers Uptown
- 1. "King Tubby Meets Rockers Uptown" Released: 1974

King Tubbys Meets Rockers Uptown is a dub studio album by Augustus Pablo and King Tubby, released in 1976. It features Carlton Barrett on drums, Robbie Shakespeare and Aston Barrett on bass guitar, and Earl "Chinna" Smith on guitar. Pablo produced the album and played melodica, piano, organ and clavinet. All sessions with the musicians were recorded at Randy's studio in Kingston, Jamaica, and then Pablo took the tapes to King Tubby for mixing. The album has been released on several different labels, often with slightly different artworks and track lists.

The title song is a dub version of the Jacob Miller song "Baby I Love You So", also produced by Pablo. It was released as a 45 rpm single in 1974 on the Mango label (MS-2001), with "Baby I Love You So" as the B-side. A distinctly different mix of the song with vocals and dub can be found on the Jacob Miller and Augustus Pablo album, Who Say Jah No Dread, released in 1992.

== Critical reception ==
Professional ratings
Review scores
Source	Rating
AllMusic	5/5 stars
All Music Guide: The Definitive Guide to Popular Music	5/5 stars
All Music Guide: The Experts' Guide (3rd ed., 1997)	4/5 stars
The Encyclopedia of Popular Music	5/5 stars
MusicHound World, Craig Harris	3.5/5 stars
MusicHound World, David Poole	5/5 stars
The New Rolling Stone Record Guide	5/5 stars
Rolling Stone	4/5 stars
Spin Alternative Record Guide	9/10

King Tubbys Meets Rockers Uptown was ranked number 96 by New Musical Express on their 1985 critics' list of the greatest albums ever made. It was ranked 5th best reggae album and 470th overall in the 1994 book All Time Top 1000 Albums, for which Colin Larkin collected votes from professional musicians and critics, as well as from the record buying public. The album was listed in the 1999 book The Rough Guide: Reggae: 100 Essential CDs. In 2007, The Guardian included it in their list of "1000 Albums to Hear Before You Die". In 2022, Treble magazine named King Tubbys Meets Rockers Uptown one of the ten essential remix albums. It was chosen as the second best reggae album of all time by Mojo magazine in their 2024 list of "The 50 Best Reggae Albums Ever".

Colin Larkin wrote that the album "features the mixing talents of King Tubby let loose on some of Pablo's finest rhythming". Music journalist Lloyd Bradley remarked: "Most of the tunes are either the most spectacular remixes of [Pablo's] previous hits or recuts of old Studio One rhythms, as Pablo always liked the natural swing found on so much rock steady". Steve Barrow claimed that King Tubbys Meets Rockers Uptown "demonstrated conclusively that a studio engineer could be considered as creative as the singers, musicians and visionary producer who made the music", and that "it is the first of all dub CDs to acquire for any collection".

MusicHound World said: "There were dub albums before King Tubby Meets Rockers Uptown, [...] but none had the impact of this recording". Music critic Will Hermes wrote in Spin: "This dub masterpiece is rawer than Pablo's bucolic East of the River Nile, [...] If you're going uptown with this one, please, let someone else drive." The Guardian opined that it "represents a pivotal moment in modern music". The title track, "King Tubby Meets Rockers Uptown", was ranked number 266 on Rolling Stone's list of the "500 Greatest Songs of All Time".

== Track listing ==
Track listing taken from Clocktower Records LP CT0085
All tracks composed by Augustus Pablo

Side one

1. "Keep On Dubbing"
2. "Stop Them Jah"
3. "Young Generation Dub"
4. "Each One Dub"
5. "555 Dub Street"

Side two

1. "Braces Tower Dub"
2. "King Tubby Meets Rockers Uptown"
3. "Corner Crew Dub"
4. "Say So"
5. "Skanking Dub"
6. "Frozen Dub"
7. "Satta Dub" (Unlisted)

2003 Deluxe edition bonus tracks

13. "Black Gunn"
14. "1 Ruthland Close"
15. "1-2-3 Version"
16. "Silent Satta"

== Personnel ==
- Augustus Pablo – melodica, piano, clavinet, organ, producer
- Robbie Shakespeare – bass guitar
- Aston "Family Man" Barrett – bass guitar
- Carlton "Carlie" Barrett – drums
- Earl "Chinna" Smith – guitar
- Richard "Dirty Harry" Hall – tenor saxophone
- Bobby Ellis – trumpet
- Vincent "Don D Junior" Gordon – trombone

Technical

- King Tubby and Errol Thompson - mixing engineer
- Glen Osborne - executive producer, design
- Michael Scudder - photography
