= Ital Dub =

Studio album by Augustus Pablo
- Released: 1974
- Recorded: 1974
- Studio: King Tubby's, Kingston, Jamaica; Dynamic Sounds, Kingston, Jamaica; Harry J, Kingston, Jamaica
- Genre: Reggae, dub
- Length: 38:42
- Label: Starapple (1974), Trojan (1975), Culture Press (1999)
- Producer: Tommy Cowan and Warwick Lyn

Augustus Pablo chronology
This Is...Augustus Pablo (1973)	Ital Dub (1974)	King Tubby Meets Rockers Uptown (1976)

Professional ratings
Review scores
Source	Rating
The Encyclopedia of Popular Music	3/5 stars
MusicHound World	3/5 stars
The New Rolling Stone Record Guide	3/5 stars
Spin Alternative Record Guide	7/10

Ital Dub is a studio album by Augustus Pablo originally released in 1974 with Tommy Cowan and Warwick Lyn replacing Clive Chin on production duties. The album also features King Tubby as mixing engineer, a role he would later reprise a number of times during Pablo's career.

== Track listing ==
1. "The Big Rip Off" (Swaby) – 3:15
2. "Road Block" (Barrett, Peart, Bob Marley) – 3:55
3. "Curly Dub" (Junior Byles) – 3:56
4. "Well Red" (Swaby) – 2:34
5. "Gun Trade" (Swaby) – 3:36
6. "Shake Up " (Swaby) – 3:26
7. "Hillside Airstrip" (Swaby) – 3:14
8. "Barbwire Disaster" (Swaby) - 2:33
9. "Mr Big" (Swaby) – 3:50
10. "Eli's Move" (Swaby) – 2:31
11. "House Raid" (Swaby) – 3:30
12. "Shake Down" (Swaby) – 3:02
