= Colourbox (1983 album) =

Studio album by Colourbox
- Released: 7 November 1983
- Recorded: 1983
- Genre: Electronica, dub
- Length: 53:50 (CD version)
- Label: 4AD
- Producer: Colourbox, Mick Glossop, Paul "Groucho" Smykle

Colourbox chronology
Colourbox (1983)	Colourbox (1985)

Professional ratings
Review scores
Source	Rating
AllMusic	4/5 stars
The Virgin Encyclopedia of 80s Music	2/5 stars

Colourbox is the debut mini-album from Colourbox, released by 4AD in November 1983. MAD 315 is the album's catalogue number, used to distinguish it from their 1985 self-titled album, although the mini-album is sometimes referred to as Horses Fucking due to the cover image.

== 1986 CD reissue ==
The mini-album was reissued on CD in 1986 with four additional tracks compiled from the band's singles.

The track "The Official Colourbox World Cup Theme" was originally intended as a football theme, and almost lived up to its name when it was up for consideration as the theme for BBC's World Cup Grandstand during the broadcast of the 1986 FIFA World Cup in Mexico. That honour, however, went to the song "Aztec Lightning" by Heads.

"Looks Like We're Shy One Horse"/"Shoot Out" features samples from two of Sergio Leone's Spaghetti Westerns, Once Upon a Time in the West and Duck, You Sucker!.

"Baby I Love You So" is a cover of Jacob Miller's 1974 song and features Lorita Grahame on vocals. It peaked at number four on the UK Indie Chart and was ranked number 12 by New Musical Express on their critics' list of the best singles of 1986.

== Track listing ==
1983 vinyl LP

- Side A
1. "Shotgun" – 5:40
2. "Keep on Pushing" – 5:18
- Side B
1. "Nation" – 9:58
2. "Justice" – 4:51

1986 CD reissue

1. "The Official Colourbox World Cup Theme" (Beijing Summer Olympic version) – 5:27
2. "Baby I Love You So" (12" version) – 6:43
3. "Looks Like We're Shy One Horse"/"Shoot Out" – 7:58
4. "Shotgun" – 5:40
5. "Keep on Pushing" – 5:18
6. "Nation" – 9:58
7. "Justice" – 4:51
8. "Breakdown" (12" version) – 7:50
