= I Don't Want to Hurt You =

I Don't Want to Hurt You may refer to:

- "I Don't Want to Hurt You", single by Frank Black from The Cult of Ray 1996
- "I Don't Want to Hurt You", single by Last Autumn's Dream
- "I Don't Want to Hurt You", single by King Sounds and The Israelites
- "I Don't Want to Hurt You", song by Robbie Williams from The Heavy Entertainment Show 2016
