= Lady (Wayne Wade song) =

1982 single by Wayne Wade

- Artwork for the Dutch vinyl single release

Single by Wayne Wade
- B-side: "Breezin'"
- Released: 1982
- Genre: Reggae
- Length: 3:45
- Label: Ariola; Epic
- Songwriter(s): Lionel Richie
- Producer(s): Paul Khouri; Willie Lindo

Wayne Wade singles chronology
| "I Can't Hide" (1982) | "Lady" (1982) | "Try Again" (1983) |

"Lady" is a song recorded by Jamaican singer Wayne Wade. The song was a top 40 hit in Sweden, peaking at No. 26. In the Netherlands and Belgium it was a top ten hit, peaking at No. 5 and No. 9, respectively.

== Track listing and formats ==
- Dutch 7-inch single

A. "Lady" – 3:45
B. "Breezin'" – 3:35

- UK 12-inch single

A. "Lady" – 6:46
B. "Breezin'" – 3:35

== Credits and personnel ==
- Wayne Wade – vocals
- Lionel Richie – songwriter
- Paul Khouri – producer
- Willie Lindo – producer

Credits and personnel adapted from the 7-inch single liner notes.

== Charts ==
=== Weekly charts ===
Weekly chart performance for "Lady"
| Chart (1983) | Peak position |
|---|---|
| Belgium (Ultratop 50 Flanders) | 9 |
| Netherlands (Single Top 100) | 5 |

Weekly chart performance for "Lady"
| Chart (1991) | Peak position |
|---|---|
| Sweden (Sverigetopplistan) | 26 |

=== Year-end charts ===
Year-end chart performance for "Lady"
| Chart (1983) | Position |
|---|---|
| Netherlands (Dutch Top 40) | 24 |
| Netherlands (Single Top 100) | 32 |
