= Black Roots (album) =

Studio album by Sugar Minott
- Released: 1979
- Recorded: 1979
- Studio: Channel One Studios/King Tubby's, Kingston, Jamaica
- Genre: Reggae
- Label: Black Roots/Island-Mango
- Producer: Sugar Minott

Sugar Minott chronology
Ghetto-ology (1979)	Black Roots (1979)	Roots Lovers (1980)

Professional ratings
Review scores
Source	Rating
AllMusic	4.5/5 stars
Christgau's Record Guide	B

Black Roots is a 1979 album by Sugar Minott. It was the first to appear on Minott's Black Roots label, and was described in the book Reggae: 100 Essential CDs – The Rough Guide as a "classic, which catches the singer on the cusp of the roots and dancehall phases, and with total control over his music." The album includes contributions from some of Jamaica's top session musicians including Leroy "Horsemouth" Wallace, Noel "Scully" Simms, Eric "Bingy Bunny" Lamont, Gladstone Anderson, Larry 'Professor Bassie' Silvera and Ansell Collins, with harmony vocals provided by Don Carlos, Lacksley Castell and Ashanti Waugh. Two of the tracks on the album had previously been issued as singles – "Hard Time Pressure" and "River Jordan". The album was described by Dave Thompson in his book Reggae & Caribbean Music as a "deeply dread collection...time has bestowed a stately uniqueness to it". Alex Henderson, writing for AllMusic, said of the album: "If you combined Stax's raw production style with the type of sweetness that characterized a lot of Chicago, Detroit and Philadelphia soul and added a reggae beat, the outcome might sound something like Black Roots."

== Release history ==
The album was first issued in limited quantities in Jamaica on Minott's Black Roots label in 1979. It was issued in the United Kingdom on the Island Records subsidiary, Mango, in 1980, and also on the Gorgon label. It was issued on compact disc in 1990 by Mango Records.

== Track listing ==
All tracks by Sugar Minott except where noted.

1. "Mankind" – 2:17
2. "Hard Time Pressure" – 3:24
3. "River Jordan" – 3:10
4. "Jail House" – 2:15
5. "I'm Gonna Hold On" – 2:38
6. "Oppressors Oppression" – 3:49
7. "2 Time Loser" – 3:07
8. "Black Roots" – 2:31
9. "Clean Runnings" – 3:02
10. "Mr. Babylon Man" (Minott, Morris) – 2:48

== Personnel ==
- Sugar Minott – vocals, production
- Noel Bailey – guitar
- Eric "Bingy Bunny" Lamont – guitar
- Tony Chin – guitar
- Gladstone Anderson – piano
- Ansell Collins – organ
- Steely Johnson – organ
- Eric "Fish" Clarke – drums
- Junior Dan – bass guitar, rhythm guitar
- Michael "Ras Star" Ashley – bass guitar, rhythm guitar
- Albert Malawi – drums
- Noel "Scully" Simms – percussion
- Everton "Youth" Carrington – percussion
- Leroy "Horsemouth" Wallace – drums
- Don Carlos – backing vocals
- Lacksley Castell – backing vocals
- Glenmore "Ashanti" Waugh – backing vocals
- Johnny "Jah" Lee – backing vocals
- Mixed by Prince Jammy and Stanley "Barnabas" Bryan
- Engineered by Anthony "Crucial Bunny" Graham & Stanley "Barnabas" Bryan
