= Black Roots =

Black Roots may refer to:

== Film ==
- Black Roots (film), a 1970 film directed by Lionel Rogosin
- Racines noires (Black Roots), a 1985 film directed by Safi Faye

== Music ==
- Black Roots (band), British reggae band, also the name of the band's debut album
- Black Roots (album), a 1979 album by Sugar Minott
- Black Roots Records, record label operated by Sugar Minott

== Literature ==
- Black Roots (novel), a 1977 novel by Robert Tralins
