= Yabby You =

- Yabby You in 1978

Background information
- Also known as: Yabby You; Yabby U
- Born: Vivian Neville Jackson; 14 August 1946; Kingston, Jamaica
- Died: 12 January 2010 (aged 63)
- Genres: Reggae
- Occupations: Singer, record producer
- Years active: 1970–2010

Vivian Neville Jackson (14 August 1946 – 12 January 2010), better known as Yabby You (or sometimes Yabby U), was a reggae vocalist and producer, who came to prominence in the early 1970s through his uncompromising self-produced work.

== Biography ==
Jackson was born in the Waterhouse district of Kingston, Jamaica in 1946. One of seven children, Jackson left home at the age of twelve to find work at a furnace in Waterhouse. At seventeen, the effects of malnutrition had left him hospitalized, and on his release, he was left with severe arthritis which had partially crippled his legs. His physical condition meant that he was unable to return to his previous work, and he was forced into hustling for a living on the streets of Kingston.

His beliefs were markedly different from that of his Rastafarian contemporaries, believing in the divinity of Jesus rather than Haile Selassie I, earning him the nickname 'Jesus Dread'; This often prompted debate on religio-philosophical matters, and it was after one of these discussions that Jackson first headed towards a recording studio, having heard music "like a strange ting, inside a my thoughts – like an angel a sing".

Another spell in hospital meant that finding money for recording was difficult, but eventually, the "Conquering Lion" single was released late in 1972, credited to 'Vivian Jackson and the Ralph Brothers'. Cut for King Tubby, the popularity of the song and its distinctive introduction (the chant of "Be-you, yabby-yabby-you") earned Jackson the nickname "Yabby You", which remained with him during his entire career.

The next few months saw the recording of several more singles, released under different names on various record labels (although usually credited to 'Vivian Jackson and the Prophets', and often featuring a King Tubby 'version' on the b-side), culminating in the release of the Conquering Lion album. A King Tubby mixed dub set, King Tubby's Prophesy of Dub, was also issued, albeit on a limited run of 500 copies, helping to establish Jackson as a roots artist.

Yabby's success allowed him to branch out as a producer, and he began working with both upcoming and more established artists, including Wayne Wade, Michael Rose, Tommy McCook, Michael Prophet, Big Youth, Trinity, Dillinger and Tapper Zukie, while continuing to release his own material.

In 1980 his songs "Deliver Me From My Enemies" and "Free Africa" appeared in the British film Babylon and were included on the soundtrack album released on Chrysalis Records. Jackson continued to record, produce and perform (often with the aid of crutches) until the mid-1980s.

He re-emerged in the early 1990s, issuing both new and old material, and his recordings were the subject of several reissues including the acclaimed Jesus Dread set on the Blood and Fire label.

In 2000, Germany's Select Cuts label released remixes of "Conquering Lion" by Smith and Mighty and Groove Corporation, followed in 2001 by a remix of "Run Come Rally" by Apollo 440.

== Death ==
Jackson died on 12 January 2010, aged 63, after suffering a ruptured brain aneurysm.

== Legacy ==
An obituary by David Katz in The Guardian newspaper stated: "he produced a series of sublime devotional recordings from the mid-1970s onwards. The apocalyptic spiritualism of his lyrics, the superb musicianship of his backing band, and the uncommon arrangement of his material, kept his output among the most compelling roots reggae releases ever issued."

Reggae historian Steve Barrow described Yabby You as a "true cornerstone of Jamaican roots music".

King Tubby's Prophesy of Dub features in both Reggae on CD: The Essential Guide and Reggae: 100 Essential CDs, with the latter also including Jesus Dread.

In 2014 Shanachie Records released a three-CD box set titled Dread Prophecy (The Strange And Wonderful Story Of Yabby You) and a Willi Williams/Yabby You project titled Unification: From Channel One To King Tubbys, which included tracks recorded in the late seventies and never released.

== Discography ==
- Conquering Lion (1975) Vivian Jackson (released as Ram A Dam in the UK, by Lucky)
- King Tubby Meets Vivian Jackson (1976) Prophet (also known as Walls Of Jerusalem, released as Chant Down Babylon Kingdom in the UK by Nationwide)
- Deliver Me From My Enemies (1977) Grove Music
- Beware (1978) Grove Music (reissued (1991) ROIR)
- Jah Jah Way (1980) Island
- African Queen (1980) Clappers
- Fleeing from the City (1985) Shanachie
- Yabby The You Man (1995)
- Jah Will Be Done (1997) Prophet Records

Compilations

- One Love, One Heart (1983) Shanachie
- Jesus Dread 1972–1977 (1997), Blood and Fire
- Deeper Roots (2012), Pressure Sounds – Yabby You & Brethren
- Deeper Roots Part 2 (2014), Pressure Sounds – Yabby You & the Prophets

Compilation appearances

- The Rough Guide to Reggae (1997), World Music Network
- The Rough Guide to Dub (2005), World Music Network

Collaborations

- King Tubby's Prophesy of Dub (1976) Prophets (reissued (1994) Blood and Fire)
- Vocal & Dub (1979) Prophet (Yabby You and Michael Prophet)
- Yabby You Meets Trinity at Dub Station (circa 1979) Yabby U (with Trinity)
- Yabby You & Michael Prophet Meets Scientist at the Dub Station (1981) Prophet (with Michael Prophet and Scientist)
- Time to Remember (1982) Prophet (with King Tubby)
- Prophecy (1982) WLN (with Michael Prophet and Wayne Wade)
- Yabby U Meets Sly & Robbie Along With Tommy McCook (1982) WLN (with Tommy McCook)
- Yabby You Meets Mad Professor & Black Steel in Ariwa Studio (1993)
