= King Tubby Meets Vivian Jackson =

- Pressure Sounds reissue cover

Studio album by Yabby You & King Tubby
- Released: 1976
- Studio: King Tubby's studio, Channel One, Joe Gibbs' studio, Dynamic Sounds, Harry J's studio, Black Ark
- Genre: roots reggae, dub reggae
- Length: 40:39
- Label: Prophet, Nationwide, Pressure Sounds
- Producer: Vivian Jackson

Yabby You chronology
Conquering Lion (1975)	King Tubby Meets Vivian Jackson (1976)	Deliver Me From My Enemies (1977)

King Tubby Meets Vivian Jackson (also known as Chant Down Babylon and Walls Of Jerusalem) is the second album by Jamaican musician Yabby You (Vivian Jackson), in collaboration with Jamaican sound engineer and dub music pioneer King Tubby.

The first half of King Tubby Meets Vivian Jackson is tracks by Yabby You with his backing band The Prophets, some of which had previously been released as 45s. The second half is dub versions of those tracks, made by King Tubby.

== Background and release ==
In 1975 Jackson and his vocal group The Prophets released their debut album Conquering Lion, which was popular in Jamaica and the UK.

Walls of Jerusalem was first released in Jamaica in 1976, and was initially sold as an LP in a blank sleeve, in a print run of only 300 copies. Jackson later reissued the album on his label Prophet under the title King Tubby Meets Vivian Jackson. In 1977 record label Nationwide released the album in the UK as Chant Down Babylon, with alternate cover art and track names, and erroneously credited it to "Yabby Youth".

In 2019 Pressure Sounds reissued the album as Walls of Jerusalem on LP and CD. The reissue included a second disc of studio outtakes and dub versions.

== Critical reception ==
Professional ratings
Review scores
Source	Rating
The Encyclopedia of Popular Music	4/5 stars

Jo-Ann Greene of AllMusic wrote that title track "Walls Of Jerusalem" is a "stellar single, a major hit, and a song that helps make You's own religious beliefs clear." The Rough Guide to Reggae said that "tracks like "Walls Of Jerusalem" and "Chant Down Babylon" are flawless, while the dubs are fully the equal of those on the classic Prophecy Of Dub set from Tubby."

David Katz described the track "Chant Down Babylon Kingdom" as "one of Yabby’s most forceful releases". He also described the album, and its follow-up Deliver Me From My Enemies, as being of the same standard as Yabby You's debut, and as "containing works of fearsome religious and political retribution, interspersed with the occasional love song."

== Track listing ==
All tracks are written by Vivian Jackson.

King Tubby Meets Vivian Jackson track listing
No.	Title	Title on Chant Down Babylon UK release	Length
1.	"Walls Of Jerusalem"	"Walls Of Jerusalem"	3:41
2.	"Chant Down Babylon"	"Chant Down Babylon Kingdom"	2:32
3.	"Fire Round Town"	"See Them A Walk"	3:24
4.	"Plague On The Land"	"King Pharoah"	3:04
5.	"Tribulation"	"Sufferation"	3:46
6.	"Go To School Jah Jah Children"	"Black Mans Land"	3:07
7.	"Dub Of Jerusalem"	"Dub Of Jerusalem"	3:44
8.	"Chanting Dub"	"Historians Dub"	2:46
9.	"Firey Dub"	"Theodore Dub"	3:47
10.	"Dub Plague"	"Ainash Nubia Dub"	3:26
11.	"Tribulation Dub"	"Shimezana Region In Dub"	3:57
12.	"School Days Dub"		3:27
Total length:			40:39

2019 Pressure Sounds Walls Of Jerusalem release: "Studio Outtakes" and "More Versions"
No.	Title	Artist	Length
13.	"The Man Who Does The Work"	Vivian Jackson & The Prophets	3:21
14.	"Valley Of Joeasaphat"	Smith & The Prophets	3:32
15.	"Go To School Jah Jah Children" (unreleased mix)	Vivian Jackson & The Prophets	3:43
16.	"Love Of Jah"	Vivian Jackson & The Prophets	4:30
17.	"Sand In My Shoe"	Tommy McCook	4:28
18.	"Jah Vengeance"	The Prophets	2:58
19.	"Greetings"	King Tubby	3:01
20.	"Fire Fire Dub"	The Prophets	2:33
21.	"Stand Up And Fight Dub"	The Prophets	3:35
22.	"Sand In My Shoe Dub"	King Tubby	3:01
23.	"Prophets Dub"	The Prophets	3:15
24.	"Repatriation Rock"	The Prophets	3:23
Total length:			41:19

== Personnel ==
- Vivian Jackson – vocals, writing, production
- Osbourne "King Tubby" Ruddock – arrangements

Other credits

- Clinton Fearon, Lloyd Parks, Robbie Shakespeare – bass
- Anthony "Benbow" Creary, Carlton "Santa" Davis, Lowell "Sly" Dunbar – drums
- Tommy McCook – flute
- Albert Griffiths, Earl "Chinna" Smith, Earl "Wire" Lindo – guitar
- Bobby Ellis, Herman Marquis, Tommy McCook – horns
- Ansel Collins, Bernard "Touter" Harvey, Earl "Wire" Lindo – keyboards
- Noel "Scully" Simms – percussion

Technical

- Carlton Lee, Anthony "Crucial Bunny" Graham, Ernest Hoo Kim, Errol "ET" Thompson, King Tubby, Lee "Scratch" Perry, Pat Kelly, Sylvan Morris – engineering
- Dave Blackman – mastering

Artistic

- Happening, Theo Bafaloukos – photography
