= East of the River Nile =

Studio album by Augustus Pablo
- Released: 1977
- Recorded: 1977
- Studio: Harry J's, Channel One, King Tubby's and Black Ark (Kingston, Jamaica)
- Genre: Dub
- Length: 41:09
- Label: Message, Shanachie
- Producer: Horace Swaby

Augustus Pablo chronology
King Tubby Meets Rockers Uptown (1976)	East of the River Nile (1977)	Original Rockers (1979)

East of the River Nile is a 1977 reggae studio album by Jamaican musician Augustus Pablo. An instrumental album, East of the River Nile showcases Pablo's skill on the melodica, and various other keyboards. Also featured are studio musicians famous as members of the Wailers, Bob Marley's backing band.

A reissue of East of the River Nile, with six bonus tracks, charted on Billboard's Reggae Albums chart in 2002, peaking at No 13.

== Critical reception ==
Professional ratings
Review scores
Source	Rating
AllMusic	5/5 stars
Robert Christgau	A
The Encyclopedia of Popular Music	4/5 stars
MusicHound World	3.5/5 stars
The New Rolling Stone Record Guide	5/5 stars
Spin Alternative Record Guide	8/10

Musician and journalist Randall Grass wrote in The New Rolling Stone Record Guide that "East of the River Nile takes dub melodicism to new heights." Trouser Press called the album "quintessential Pablo, and perhaps his most consistent LP." The Spin Alternative Record Guide highlighted "a floating, childlike wonderment pervading the first half especially."

== Track listing ==
All tracks composed by Horace Swaby
All tracks mixed by King Tubby, except "Upful Living" mixed by Lee Perry

Side one

1. "Chant to King Selassie I" (with Ja-Malla Band)
2. "Natural Way" (with Ja-Malla Band)
3. "Nature Dub"
4. "Upfull Living" (with the Upsetters)
5. "Unfinished Melody" (with the Upsetters)
6. "Jah Light"

Side two

1. "Memories of the Ghetto" (with the Upsetters)
2. "Africa (1983)"
3. "East of the River Nile"
4. "Sounds from Levi"
5. "Chapter 2"
6. "Addis Ababa"

2002 CD reissue extra tracks

13. "East Africa"
14. "East of the River Nile" (Original)
15. "Memories of the Ghetto Dub"
16. "Jah Light Version"
17. "Islington Rock"
18. "Meditation Dub"

== Personnel ==
- Augustus Pablo – organ, piano, strings, keyboards, clavinet, melodica
- Aston "Family Man" Barrett – bass
- Clayton Downie – bass
- Robert "Robbie" Shakespeare – bass
- Earl "Bagga" Walker – bass
- Carlton "Carlie" Barrett – drums
- Noel "Alphonso" Benbow – drums
- Max Edwards – drums
- Earl "Chinna" Smith – lead guitar
- Everton Da Silva – percussions
- Ja-Malla Band – played on "Chant to King Selassie I" and "Natural Way"
- The Upsetters played on "Upfull Living", "Unfinished Melody" and "Memories of the Ghetto"

Technical

- Ernest Hookim, Errol Thompson, Lee Perry, Prince Jammy, Sylvan Morris – engineer
- King Tubby – mixing
- Lee Perry – mixing
- Orville "Bagga" Case – artwork
- Walsh's Photo Studio - cover photography
