= Conquering Lion =

Conquering Lion may refer to:

- the Lion of Judah
- Rebel MC, an English jungle producer and toaster
- Conquering Lion Pictures, a Canadian independent film production company
- Conquering Lion (album), 1975 album by Yabby You & The Prophets
