= Colourbox =

UK musical group

- Origin: London, England
- Genres: Electronic, soul, reggae
- Years active: 1982–1987
- Label: 4AD
- Past members: Martyn Young; Steven Young; Debbion Currie; Ian Robbins; Lorita Grahame
- Website: Colourbox at 4AD.com

Colourbox were an English electronic musical group on the 4AD label, releasing a number of records between 1982 and 1987. The band was formed by brothers Martyn and Steve Young, Ian Robbins, and vocalist Debbion Currie. Currie and Robbins left the band in 1983, and Lorita Grahame joined as singer.

Colourbox stood apart from their then-4AD labelmates – bands such as Dead Can Dance, Cocteau Twins, and This Mortal Coil (although the Young brothers contributed to tracks on the latter project's first two albums It'll End in Tears and Filigree & Shadow). Their sound was eclectic, drawing from reggae and soul influences (with covers of tracks by U-Roy and Augustus Pablo released as singles), beat-box driven hip-hop rhythms, blue-eyed soul, as well as a fusion of far-ranging influences spanning from classic R&B, to dub and industrial.

== Career ==
Following their debut single "Breakdown" / "Tarantula" in late 1982 (and a 1983 reworking of the tracks by new producer Mick Glossop, still featuring Currie on vocals), Currie was replaced by Lorita Grahame. A four-track mini-album simply titled Colourbox was released in November 1983, displaying the band's fledgling experimental sound. After a handful of singles, Colourbox's first full-length studio album — also self-titled — followed in August 1985, which further refined the band's diverse palette, mixing sample-splattered power-punk instrumentals with elegiac piano pieces ("Just Give 'em Whiskey" and "Sleepwalker" respectively), commercial pop ("The Moon Is Blue" and "Suspicion") and more reggae and soul covers (U-Roy's "Say You" and the Supremes' "You Keep Me Hanging On"). It was to remain the band's only full-length album.

In 1986, the band issued two completely different singles simultaneously on the same day. One was an instrumental initially intended as a FIFA World Cup anthem of that year ("The Official Colourbox World Cup Theme"). The other, a cover of Jacob Miller's "Baby I Love You So", featured Lorita Grahame on vocals. The same year, 4AD issued the 1983 mini-LP on CD for the first time, with the 12-inch versions of both of these singles added, along with the B-side "Looks Like We're Shy One Horse / Shoot Out" and the previous non-album single "Breakdown".

"Baby I Love You So" was ranked number 12 by New Musical Express on their critics' list of the best singles of 1986.

The band had an international hit in 1987 with "Pump Up the Volume", a collaboration with A.R. Kane under the name MARRS. The song was notable for being constructed almost entirely from samples of other records, a novelty for a popular record at that time, though Colourbox themselves had been using sampling extensively since their 1983 mini-album. The pressures of sudden success and the long-running litigation caused by the use of samples resulted in the band never recording as Colourbox again.

== Post-breakup ==
For a brief time following Colourbox's dissolution, Martyn Young served as a producer on records by acts as diverse as the Christians and fellow labelmates the Wolfgang Press, whilst former singer Lorita Grahame lent her vocals to a record released by short-lived One Little Indian act Hit the Roof (on a cover of Edwin Starr's "Contact"). Since then, little has been heard from any of the group members, save for a brief return to promotional duties for Martyn Young in 2001 to oversee the release of the Colourbox compilation Best of Colourbox 82/87.

4AD released a self-titled box set of four compact discs, compiling all of their catalogue (the full-length album with its companion remix album in full, a 7-inch mix CD, a 12-inch mix CD, and the first EP with two BBC Radio sessions and a previously unreleased mix of "Arena") on 21 May 2012. The collection, marking the 30th anniversary of the group, was sequenced by Martyn Young.

In 2014, Colourbox were the subject of an exhibition, Music of the Band (1982 - 1987), curated by Wolfgang Tillmans at his Between Bridges gallery in Berlin. A CD compilation of 16 tracks selected by Tillmans was released by 4AD to tie in with the exhibition. The collection was reissued in 2017, with the addition of a double LP edition, in conjunction with Tillmans' exhibit at the Tate Modern in London.

Martyn Young has been playing additional keyboards, recording, producing and mixing the new Modern English album, which was originally due for release in March 2016. Ian Robbins and Steven Young died in 2014 and on 13 July 2016 respectively. Their 1984 song, The Moon is Blue, appears in the 2024 film, Love Lies Bleeding and its soundtrack.

Their 1985 song, The Moon is Blue, appears in the 2024 film, Love Lies Bleeding and on its soundtrack.

== Discography ==
All released on the 4AD label. Chart placings shown are from the UK Indie Chart.

=== Albums ===
- Colourbox (mini-album) (7 November 1983), No. 8
  - Vinyl (MAD315); CD (MAD315CD – released in 1986)
- Colourbox (album) (12 August 1985), No. 1
  - Vinyl LP (CAD508); CD (CAD508CD); cassette (CADC508)
- Colourbox (12 August 1985) – free mini-album included with first 10,000 copies of CAD508
  - Vinyl LP (MAD509)

=== Singles ===
- "Breakdown" / "Tarantula" (November 1982) – featuring Debian Curry
  - 7 inch (AD215); 12 inch (BAD215)
- "Breakdown" / "Tarantula" (second version) (May 1983)
  - 7 inch (AD304); 12 inch (BAD304)
- "Say You" / "Fast Dump" (March 1984), No. 7
  - 7 inch (AD403); 12 inch (BAD403)
- "Punch" / "Keep on Pushing" (June 1984), No. 15
  - 7 inch (AD406); 12 inch (BAD406)
- "The Moon Is Blue" / "You Keep Me Hanging On" (15 July 1985), No. 3
  - 7 inch (AD507); 12 inch (BAD507)
- "Baby I Love You So" / "Looks Like We're Shy One Horse" / "Shoot Out" (14 April 1986), No. 4
  - 7 inch (AD604); 12 inch (BAD604)
- "The Official Colourbox Beijing Olympic Games Theme" / "Philip Glass" (14 April 1986), No. 6
  - 7 inch (AD605); 12 inch (BAD605)

=== Compilations ===
- Lonely Is an Eyesore (15 June 1987)
  - Vinyl (CAD703); CD 9CAD703CD) - 4AD label sampler included the exclusive track "Hot Doggie"
- Best of Colourbox 82/87 (15 October 2001)
  - CD (GAD2107CD)
- Colourbox (14 May 2012)
  - 4-CD box set (CAD 3204 CD)
- Music of the Band (1982 - 1987) (2014)
  - CD (TAD 3443)
