= This Is Augustus Pablo =

This Is....Augustus Pablo

Studio album by Augustus Pablo
- Released: 1974
- Studio: Randy's, Kingston, Jamaica
- Genre: Reggae
- Length: 35:19
- Label: Heartbeat
- Producer: Clive Chin

Augustus Pablo chronology
Red Sea (1970-1973)	This Is....Augustus Pablo (1974)	Ital Dub (1974)

Alternative cover
- Alternate front cover from the 1987 CD release on Heartbeat Records

Professional ratings
Review scores
Source	Rating
AllMusic	3/5 stars
The Encyclopedia of Popular Music	4/5 stars
MusicHound World	3.5/5 stars
The New Rolling Stone Record Guide	3/5 stars

This Is...Augustus Pablo is a studio album by the Jamaican musician Augustus Pablo, originally released in 1974 and co-written and produced by Pablo's childhood friend and reggae producer Clive Chin. The album boasts a list of session musicians including Ansel Collins on keyboards and Lloyd Parks and Aston Barrett both on bass guitar. The album was one of the first to showcase Pablo's unique use of the melodica.

== Track listing ==
1. "Dub Organizer" (Chin, Swaby) – 2:56
2. "Please Sunrise" (Adapted) – 2:38
3. "Point Blank" (Chin, Swaby) – 2:32
4. "Arabian Rock" (Chin, Swaby) – 3:53
5. "Pretty Baby" (Adapted) – 2:45
6. "Pablo in Dub " (Swaby) – 2:30
7. "Skateland Rock" (Chin, Swaby) – 3:13
8. "Dread Eye" (Adapted) – 3:03
9. "Too Late" (Chin, Swaby) – 3:16
10. "Assignment No. 1" (Chin, Swaby) – 2:46
11. "Jah Rock" (Chin, Swaby) – 2:52
12. "Lover's Mood" (Chin, Swaby) – 2:55

== Personnel ==
- Augustus Pablo – keyboards, melodica
- Lloyd "Tinleg" Adams – drums
- Aston Barrett – bass guitar, guitar
- Carlton "Charlie" Barrett – drums
- Clive Chin – percussion
- Ansel Collins – keyboards
- Carlton "Santa" Davis – drums
- George Fullwood – bass guitar
- Bertram "Ranchie" McLean – guitar
- Lloyd Parks – bass guitar
- Earl "Chinna" Smith – guitar
- Errol Thompson – percussion
