= Original Rockers =

Compilation album by Augustus Pablo
- Released: 1979
- Recorded: 1972–1975
- Studio: Channel One, Kingston, Jamaica; Dynamic Sounds, Kingston, Jamaica
- Genre: Reggae
- Label: Greensleeves
- Producer: Augustus Pablo

Augustus Pablo chronology
East of the River Nile (1977)	Original Rockers (1979)	Rockers Meets King Tubby in a Firehouse (1980)

Original Rockers is a reggae compilation album by Augustus Pablo that collects singles recorded between 1972 and 1975. It was originally released in 1979 on Greensleeves Records and was compiled by journalist and photographer Dave Hendley.

The album features Robbie Shakespeare and Aston Barrett on bass guitar, Earl "Chinna" Smith on guitar, and guest vocals from Dillinger on the track "Brace a Boy". The songs were recorded at Channel One and Dynamic Sounds studios in Kingston, Jamaica, and mixed at legendary dub engineer King Tubby's studio.

== Critical reception ==
Professional ratings
Review scores
Source	Rating
AllMusic	4/5 stars
The Encyclopedia of Popular Music	4/5 stars
MusicHound World	3/5 stars
The New Rolling Stone Record Guide	5/5 stars
Spin Alternative Record Guide	8/10

Original Rockers was included in Steve Barrow and Peter Dalton's 1999 book The Rough Guide to Reggae: 100 Essential CDs. Musician and journalist Randall Grass hightlighted the "impresive variety" of the compilation. Trouser Press recommended the album as "a perfect starting point" for "the uninitiated" and called the compilation "diverse" and the songs' production "bright and snappy".

== Track listing ==
1. "Rockers Dub"
2. "Up Warrika Hill"
3. "Cassava Piece"
4. "Tubbys Dub Song"
5. "Jah Dread"
6. "Brace a Boy"
7. "Thunder Clap"
8. "Park Lane Special"
9. "New Style"
10. "AP Special" (Adapted)

Bonus tracks featured on #GREWCD 8 release

1. "Tubby's Dub Song (Dub Version 2)"
2. "Brace a Boy (Dub Version 2)"

== Personnel ==
- Augustus Pablo – keyboards, melodica, piano, organ, clavinet
- Dillinger – vocals
- Carlton Barrett – drums
- Robbie Shakespeare, Aston Barrett – bass guitar
- Earl "Chinna" Smith – guitar
- Don D. Junior – trombone
- Bobby Ellis – trumpet
- Dirty Harry – tenor saxophone
- King Tubby, Philip Smart, Prince Jammy – mixing engineers
