= Easy (band) =

- Origin: Finland
- Genres: Pop, reggae
- Years active: 1974 - 1981, 2014 - present
- Label: Scandia
- Spinoff of: Musakatit
- Members: Lauri "Lappe" Holopainen; Sami Javne; Roni Kamras; Petteri Kokljuschkin; Erno Laitinen

Easy is a pop band from Finland who were active from the 1970s. They recorded for the Scandia label. They had a three-decade hiatus before reforming in the 2010s.

== Background ==
The group was made up of Sami Jawne, Roni Kamras, Peter Kokljuschkin and Christian Nyberg.

The history of the band can be traced back to an outfit called Musakatit. A readers vote in the magazine Suosikki was responsible for them changing their name. The group was founded in 1974. They were a covers band. According to an article in Borgåbladet (20 januari 2017) by Maj-Louise Wilkman, Roni Kamras said that they became hooked on the Eagles because of the similarities in their vocals.

During their time they released an album which they had a hand in producing.

The group took a thirty-three-year break due to members starting families. It was around 2014 that the band got back together. This was due to promoter Petteri Kokljuschkin who was putting together a Tribute Band Festival at Cafe Piritta in Helsinki. He persuaded the Easy members to reform. By 2019, the group had focused all of their performances on the Eagles.

== Career (Musakatit period) ==
Musakatit recorded the Lasse Holmström composition, "Niin se on". Backed with "Tänne mä jään", it was released in Finland on Philips 6034 062. Later they recorded "Lihava On Lämmin" which was their version of Carl Malcolm's song "Fattie Bum-Bum". It was backed with "Hymyillen, nauraen" and released on Philips 6034 107 in 1976. The following year they released the single, "Pakoon" / "Heittää Huulta" ("Let Your Love Flow") on Scandia KS 974.

== Career (Easy) ==
=== 1977 - 1981 ===
At an early stage in Easy's career, they played at the Helsinki Culture Centre once a month. One time after a gig, the group was approached by two ladies who were a bit older than them. They were fascinated by the band's music and had booked two rooms for the whole group in a hotel which was a couple of kilometers from the house they stayed. The men were treated to sparkling wine, whiskey and salmon sandwiches. They did wonder what these women had planned for them. They were in a better environment and had a few drinks and a sauna which put them in an elevated mood. After going to the concert hall and in their towels, they played a private gig for the ladies. The whole affair was quite innocent and afterwards the women escorted them to the hotel door and gave them their sincere thanks.

The group was photographed in 1977 while on their way to the Eagles' Hotel California tour gig in Stockholm. At the time the group line up was Roni Kamras, Christer Nyberg, Sami Javne and Petteri Kokljuschkin.

In 1978, the group released their version of the Bellamy Brothers song "Crossfire", "Käännä kasvot tuuleen" on Scandia KS 1002. Later they released the single, "Kyyneleet Nuo" ("Mexican Girl"). It was backed with "Kiihtyy Vauhti Lautojen" ("Skateboard"), and released on Scandia KS 1030 in 1979.

In 1981, the group broke up. It wasn't until the summer of 2014 that they got back together.

=== 2010s - present ===
On 27 May 2016, the band were to play at Sello Hall, a concert in memory of Eagles frontman Glenn Frey.

On 18 January 2019 which was the anniversary of Glenn Frey's death, they were set to play an Eagles tribute concert in Kannusali.

By early 2025, the line up comprised Lappe Holopainen, Sami Javne, Katri Silolahti, Peter "Petteri" Kokljuschkin, Roni Kamras and Tomi Juustila.

== Discography ==
=== Singles ===
- "Käännä Kasvot Tuuleen" ("Crossfire") / "Ajatus Siivet Saa" ("Memorabilia") - Scandia KS 1002 - 1978
- "Kyyneleet Nuo" ("Mexican Girl") / "Kiihtyy Vauhti Lautojen" ("Skateboard") - Scandia KS 1030 - 1978

=== Albums ===
- Easy - Scandia SLP 667 - 1979

== Members ==
- Petteri Kokljuschkin - bass
- Sami Javne - drums, vocals
- Roni Kamras guitar, vocals
- Lauri "Lappe" Holopainen - guitar, vocals
- Erno Laitinen - guitar, vocals
