= Lacksley Castell =

Jamaican reggae singer

- Born: Lacksley Hugh Castell; 10 April 1959; Kingston, Jamaica
- Died: November 1983 (aged 24)
- Genres: Reggae
- Occupation: Singer-songwriter
- Instrument: Vocals
- Years active: 1978–1983
- Labels: Negus Roots, Rockers, Live and Love

Lacksley Hugh Castell, sometimes misspelled Laxley, Lacksly, Lasky or Locksley Castel (10 April 1959 – November 1983) was a Jamaican reggae singer best known for his work in the early 1980s.

== Biography ==
Lacksley Castell was born in 1959, (although some sources claim 1962). The third of five brothers, Castell grew up on Dilliston Avenue in Kingston's Waterhouse district, the area also home to artists such as Black Uhuru and The Travellers; Castell recorded in what was known as the "Waterhouse style". He became friends with Hugh Mundell who helped both him and his friend Junior Reid to get started in the music business. That resulted in Castell's first single releases in 1978, "Babylon World" and "Love in Your Heart", recorded with Augustus Pablo. In 1979, he recorded "Jah Love Is Sweeter" at Lee "Scratch" Perry's Black Ark Studios, which was a pre-release reggae chart hit in the United Kingdom in August 1979, with "What a Great Day" (produced by Prince Jammy) making the top five of the reggae 12-inch singles chart the same month.

In 1980, Castell recorded the Jah Fire album with Hugh Mundell, produced by Prince Jammy. He also provided backing vocals on Sugar Minott's Black Roots album and had a further 12-inch hit with "African Queen" that year. His first solo album, Morning Glory, was released in 1982 on Robert "Flacko" Palmer's Negus Roots label, who also produced the record. This was followed by a second album, Princess Lady in 1983, co-arranged by Dean Fraser and mixed by Neil "Mad Professor" Fraser. Castell was also credited as arranger on fellow Negus Roots artists Sly & Robbie's 1982 album, Dub Rockers Delight, which consisted of dubs from his Morning Glory album. Dubs from the Princess Lady album were included on Mad Professor's In a Rub a Dub Style.

Castell died in November 1983, at the age of 24, after an illness. He was buried in May Pen Cemetery in Kingston in an unmarked grave, and because of that, his exact burial spot had never been spotted until April 2020 through the persistence of a close friend of his younger brother Trevor Castell, Rohan Thompson. His two albums were re-issued on CD in 2005. A Lacksley Castell Facebook page is maintained by his brother Trevor Castell.

== Discography ==
=== Albums ===
- 1980: Jah Fire (with Hugh Mundell)
- 1982: Morning Glory
- 1983: Princess Lady

=== Singles ===
- 1978: "Babylon World"
- 1978: "Love in Your Heart"
- 1979: "What a Great Day (It Will Be)"
- 1979: "Jah Love Is Sweeter"
- 1979: "My Collie Tree"
- 1980: "African Queen"
- 1980: "Unkind to Myself"
- 1981: "Jah Is Watching You"
- 1981: "Government Man"
- 1982: "Speak Softly"
- 1983: "Tug-a-War Games"
- 1983: "Johnny Brown"
