= Colourbox (1985 album) =

Studio album by Colourbox
- Released: 12 August 1985
- Studio: Palladium, Edinburgh, Scotland, UK; Guerilla, Crouch End, North London, UK; Rooster, West London, UK; Maison Rouge, London, UK
- Genre: Electronica
- Length: 41:29
- Label: 4AD
- Producer: Martyn Young (except "Punch" by Bob Carter)

Colourbox chronology
Colourbox (1983)	Colourbox (1985)

Singles from Colourbox
- 1. "Say You" Released: March 1984; 2. "Punch" Released: June 1984; 3. "The Moon Is Blue" Released: July 1985

Professional ratings
Review scores
Source	Rating
AllMusic	4/5 stars
The Virgin Encyclopedia of 80s Music	3/5 stars

Colourbox is the only full-length studio album by the English band Colourbox, released by 4AD in August 1985. CAD 508 is the album's catalogue number, used to distinguish it from the earlier mini-album of the same name. The first 10,000 copies of the vinyl LP came with a bonus LP MAD 509. The CD release included the first side of the bonus LP. The album was preceded by the singles "Say You" in March 1984, "Punch" in June 1984, and "The Moon Is Blue" in July 1985.

== Track listing ==
All songs written by Steve and Martyn Young, except where noted.

1. "Sleepwalker" – 2:16
2. "Just Give 'em Whiskey" – 4:19
3. "Say You" (U-Roy) – 3:58
4. "The Moon Is Blue" – 4:37
5. "Inside Informer" – 4:24
6. "Punch" – 5:01
7. "Suspicion" – 4:27
8. "Manic" – 2:26
9. "You Keep Me Hangin On" (Holland–Dozier–Holland) – 5:38
10. "Arena" – 4:23

== Personnel ==
- All instruments by Steve and Martyn Young.
- Vocals by Lorita Grahame.
- Guitar solo on "Manic" by William Orbit.
- Tablas on "Arena" by Chris Karan.
- Produced by Martyn Young, except "Punch" produced by Bob Carter.
- Recorded at Palladium, Guerilla, Rooster, and Maison Rouge.
- Mixed at Rooster, Guerilla, and Maison Rouge.
- "Arena" mixed by Hugh Jones at R.G. Jones
- Engineered by Jon Turner (at Palladium), John Madden (at Rooster), and Rico (at Guerilla).
- Sleeve design by Vaughan Oliver.

== Colourbox MAD 509 ==
Colourbox MAD 509

Studio album by Colourbox
- Released: 12 August 1985
- Recorded: Palladium, Guerilla, Rooster, and Maison Rouge
- Genre: Electronica
- Length: 26:51
- Label: 4AD
- Producer: Martyn Young

Colourbox chronology
Colourbox (1985)	Colourbox MAD 509 (1985)	Best of Colourbox 82/87 (2001)

Colourbox MAD 509 is a mini-album by Colourbox. It was released as a free bonus record with the first 10,000 copies of Colourbox's self-titled album. The four tracks on the A-side were included on the CD version of CAD 508, while the three tracks on the B-side were not. The final track, "Sex Gun", is a vocal version of the original album instrumental "Just Give 'em Whiskey".

=== Track listing ===
- Side A
1. "Edit the Dragon" – 2:44
2. "Hipnition" – 3:01
3. "We Walk Around the Streets" – 0:25
4. "Arena II" – 5:01
- Side B
1. "Manic II" – 5:54
2. "Fast Dump" – 5:44
3. "Sex Gun" – 4:02
