= Fatty Boom Boom =

Single by Die Antwoord

from the album Ten$Ion
- Released: 16 October 2012
- Length: 3:46
- Label: Zef Recordz
- Songwriters: DJ Hi-Tek, Watkin Tudor Jones, Yolandi Visser

Die Antwoord singles chronology
"Baby's on Fire" (2012)	"Fatty Boom Boom" (2012)	"Cookie Thumper!" (2013)

"Fatty Boom Boom" is a song by South African hip hop group Die Antwoord from their second studio album Ten$Ion. The song was written by DJ Hi-Tek, Ninja, and Yolandi Visser. The song's chorus is an interpolation of Carl Malcolm's 1975 reggae single "Hey Fattie Bum Bum". The song also references Masta Ace's "Slaughtahouse", Vanilla Ice's "Ice Ice Baby", M.I.A.'s "Jimmy" and Eminem's "My Name Is". The term derives from Jamaican Patois and remains commonly used in Jamaica since emerging in the late seventies.

The official music video for the song premiered on 16 October 2012 and generated controversy for some because of its usage of black body paint, as well as poking fun at Lady Gaga which triggered a response from her on Twitter.

== Music video ==
=== Background ===
The official music video for the song premiered on 16 October 2012. It was directed by Ninja, Terence Neale, and Saki Berg. Described by Die Antwoord, the video is a "bright and colourful African adventure, complete with wild animals, zef savages singing and dancing in the streets, and a special guest appearance by a sneaky little prawn star."

=== Synopsis ===
The video features a male Lady Gaga impersonator donning Gaga's meat dress during a tour of a "concrete jungle" in Johannesburg. Her guide (Dave Kibuuka) points out Die Antwoord, who are preparing to street-perform and she remarks that she wishes to tour with them, a reference to Die Antwoord's former label, Interscope Records, contacting them in March 2012 and informing them Gaga wished to have the band open for her during the Born This Way Ball, to which they declined. In the video, Gaga's minibus is hijacked while stopped at a robot and she flees in fear. During her escape she discovers the office of a gynecologist (Kagiso Lediga). She complains that there is something "really funny going on down there" before he removes a parktown prawn from her vagina. The scene is based on a drawing by Anton Kannemeyer titled "Black Gynecologist". After leaving the office, she is chased and eaten by a lion. In between the scenes of Gaga are scenes of Yo-Landi, Ninja, and DJ Hi-Tek performing, most scenes showing them in full body paint including blackface.

=== Controversies ===
The day after the video was released, Lady Gaga tweeted "i fink u freaky but you don't have a hit. hundred thousand tickets sold in SA (South Africa) #thatsmyshit" and "i guess its not a good idea to tell someone you're a fan." Die Antwoord replied on Facebook by saying "even tho u r 'larger' than us... we still cooler than u... plus we don't have prawns in our private parts... haha!"

Yo-Landi with her body painted black.

Aisha Harris of Slate criticized the band's usage of blackface: they failed "to bring anything fresh to the subject. Instead, they borrow loaded imagery for a cheap thrill, and do little with the horrific history behind it"; "in line with the—some say false—persona they have carved out for themselves as rebellious, in-your-face provocateurs who are meant to bring a voice to the disenfranchised." Hearty magazine also took position, stating the video was "a gimmick using the shock value of a horrifically racist part of history."

== Personnel ==
- Songwriting – Watkin Tudor Jones, Yolandi Visser
- Vocals – Yolandi Visser, Watkin Tudor Jones
