= King Tubby Meets Rockers Uptown (song) =

"King Tubby Meets the Rockers Uptown"
- Dutch single cover

Single by Augustus Pablo

from the album King Tubbys Meets Rockers Uptown
- B-side: "Baby I Love You So"
- Released: 1974
- Studio: Randy's, Kingston, Jamaica; King Tubby's, Kingston 11, Jamaica
- Genre: Dub; reggae
- Length: 2:58
- Label: Mango
- Songwriter: Augustus Pablo
- Producer: Augustus Pablo

"King Tubby Meets Rockers Uptown" is a dub instrumental track by reggae musician Augustus Pablo, first released under the title "King Tubby Meets the Rockers Uptown" as a single in 1974 on Island Records sublabel Mango Records. It is a dub version of the Jacob Miller song "Baby I Love You So", also produced by Pablo. King Tubby was the mixing engineer.

Island issued the track again as a single in 1975 in the US, Canada, UK and Netherlands. As "King Tubby's Meet Rockers Up-Town", it was also released in Jamaica in 1975 as the B-side of "Baby I Love You So". With the title "King Tubby Meets Rockers Uptown", it was later included on the 1976 album King Tubbys Meets Rockers Uptown. There is no record of the single ever having charted or having had commercial success.

At a time when other dub musicians emphasized bass lines and drums, Pablo and sound engineer King Tubby accentuated the melodica melody line in this cut using four-track recording technology. Musicology professor Michael Veal wrote that the track's appeal stems partly from "Pablo's dynamic backing rhythm, built from an insistent, eighth-note bass pattern anchoring a I minor-IV minor chord sequence". AllMusic noted "a busy, almost double-time drum part that, in its intricacy, foreshadows the frenetic breakbeats of mid-'90s jungle."

== Critical reception ==
AllMusic claimed that the song is "widely regarded as the finest example of dub ever recorded". The Guardian wrote: "Miller's impassioned voice drifts in and out like a haunted soul in a psychic cul-de-sac, tormented by the remarkable barrage of Carlton Barrett's doubled-up drumming and Pablo's mournful melodica". Music journalist Lloyd Bradley highlighted the tune's "unrestrained joy, playfulness and celebration". AllMusic's song review said, "guitar parts are chopped up ... while their decaying echoes pass slowly out of phase with the song's underlying rhythm and set up a tension that plays nicely off the song's minor-key groove." "King Tubby Meets Rockers Uptown" was listed as the third best song ever recorded by Mojo.

In 2021, it was listed at No. 266 on Rolling Stone's "Top 500 Greatest Songs of All Time".

== "Baby I Love You So" ==
"Baby I Love You So" is the vocal song on which the dub version "King Tubby Meets Rockers Uptown" is based. It is sung by Jacob Miller and was produced by Augustus Pablo. It was released as a single in 1974 with the dub version on the B-side. AllMusic called it "a masterpiece" and wrote: "It says much about King Tubby's genius that his phenomenal dub of this number would eclipse Jacob Miller's own sublime vocal version".

British band Colourbox released a cover of "Baby I Love You So" as a single in 1986. It is a dub remix itself, but with the vocals, sung by Lorita Grahame, fully in place. It peaked at number four on the UK Indie Chart and was ranked number 12 by New Musical Express on their critics' list of the best singles of 1986.

In 1994, Jamaican singer Dawn Penn released a cover of "Baby I Love You So" titled "Night and Day" on her album No, No, No. Later that year, she released it as a single with the title "Night and Day (Baby I Love You So)", peaking at number 81 on the UK charts. Its music video was filmed in Brooklyn's Prospect Park.

== Other use ==
The track was featured on the reggae radio station K-Jah West in the soundtrack of the popular video game Grand Theft Auto: San Andreas, released in October 2004.
