= Rising Sun (Augustus Pablo album) =

Studio album by Augustus Pablo
- Released: 1986
- Recorded: 1985
- Studio: Channel One, Kingston, Jamaica; Dynamic Sounds, Kingston, Jamaica; Tuff Gong, Kingston, Jamaica; HC&F, Freeport, New York, US
- Genre: Reggae
- Label: Greensleeves
- Producer: Augustus Pablo

Augustus Pablo chronology
| King David's Melody (1983) | Rising Sun (1986) | Rockers Come East (1987) |

Professional ratings
Review scores
| Source | Rating |
|---|---|
| AllMusic | 3/5 stars |
| The Encyclopedia of Popular Music | 3/5 stars |
| Spin Alternative Record Guide | 8/10 |

Rising Sun is a reggae studio album by Augustus Pablo, originally released in 1986 on Greensleeves.

It features Sly Dunbar on drums, Earl "Chinna" Smith on guitar and Dean Frazer on saxophone. Pablo produced the album and played melodica, piano, organ and synthesizer.

The songs were recorded at Channel One, Dynamic Sounds and Tuff Gong in Kingston, Jamaica, and at HC&F in Freeport, Long Island, New York.

The album features Phillip Smart and Scientist as engineers.

== Track listing ==
Side one

1. "Dub Wiser"
2. "Hop I Land"
3. "Rising Sun"
4. "Fire Red"
5. "Jah Wind"

Side two

1. "Pipers of Zion"
2. "The Day Before the Riot"
3. "African Frontline"
4. "Melchesedec (The High Priest)"
5. "Sign and Wonders"
6. "Kent Road"

== Personnel ==
- Augustus Pablo – keyboards, melodica, piano, organ, synthesizer.
- Sly Dunbar, Noel Alphonso, Basil "Benbow" Creary – drums
- Chris Meredith, Boogsie – bass guitar
- Fazal Prendergast, Earl "Chinna" Smith, Leebert "Gibby" Morrison, Clive Jeffery – guitar
- Menelek, Shacka, Jango – percussion
- Phillip Smart and Scientist – Engineer
- Noel Hearn and Scientist - Mixing Engineer
