= Paul Blackman =

British theatrical producer and director

Paul Blackman (born 7 December 1958 in Worthing, England) is a British theatrical producer and director.

== Career ==
Former deputy director of the National Youth Theatre of Great Britain, Blackman in October 1990 became the artistic director of The Battersea Arts Centre (BAC) whose fortunes he revitalised with a string of programming and audience development initiatives including the now much copied "Pay What You Can" evenings. He founded the British Festival of Visual Theatre and the "Short BAC and Sides" festival that came to serve as the premier testing ground for the Edinburgh Festival Fringe.

Notable and notorious productions during his tenure include an adaptation of the Marquis De Sades 120 Days of Sodom; the David Glass Ensembles production of Gormenghast; the Company of Clerks production of The Master and Margarita. Blackman produced and directed new writing such as Bloody Hero by Brendon Somers, Obsession by Douglas McFerran, new comedies such as Patricks Day by Sean Hughes and Owen O'Neil, Schmucks by Roy Smiles and established the tradition of the Christmas musical at BAC with productions of Sweet Charity, Josephine and Calamity Jane.

Many writers, actors and company's developed their work at BAC during Blackmans tenure included Théâtre de Complicité, Ridiculusmus, Clod Ensemble, Told by an Idiot, The Right Size, Talking Pictures, Trestle, Phil Wilmot and the Steam Industry, Jack Shepherd, Arthur Smith, Joe Penhall, Adrian Lester, Douglas Hodge, Paul Merton, Caroline Quentin and Ken Campbell.

After leaving Battersea in 1995 to work in New York, Blackman returned to the UK for two years in 1998 to programme the Roundhouse arts venue in Camden town which had laid closed for 17 years and had been bought by philanthropist Sir Torquil Norman – prior to the building closing for a multimillion-pound refurbishment. Blackman produced a two-year programme of work that recalled the venues legendary days of the 1970s featuring productions from the National Theatre, Ken Cambell, Stomp and De la Guarda – De La Guarda's Vila Villa became the longest running show ever to play at the Roundhouse.

In 2000, Blackman returned to live and work in New York City, where he is the Chair of the Institute of British Theatre and a board member of Classic Stage Company. He continues to serve on the association of the National Youth Theatre and is a Vice President of the Spanish Shakespeare Institute at the Fundacion Shakespeare in Valencia
