= Dale End, Derbyshire =

Hamlet in Derbyshire, England

Coordinates: 53.1492°N 1.6855°W

Dale End
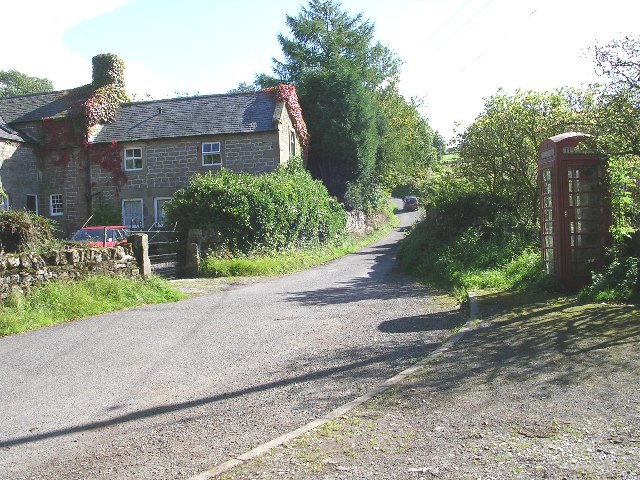
- a hamlet

- Location within Derbyshire
- OS grid reference: SK221609
- District: Derbyshire Dales
- Shire county: Derbyshire
- Region: East Midlands
- Country: England
- Sovereign state: United Kingdom
- Post town: MATLOCK
- Postcode district: DE45
- Police: Derbyshire
- Fire: Derbyshire
- Ambulance: East Midlands

Dale End is a hamlet in Derbyshire, England, located to the west of Elton.
