= Herman Chin Loy =

Jamaican record producer

- Born: 11 July 1948 (age 77) Trelawny Parish, Jamaica
- Genres: Reggae, dub
- Occupation: Record producer

Herman Chin Loy (born 11 July 1948 in Trelawny, Jamaica) is a Jamaican record producer, best known for his productions from the late 1960s and early 1970s of artists such as Augustus Pablo, Dennis Brown, Alton Ellis and Bruce Ruffin, and for the Aquarius and Scorpio record labels that he ran. He is a Chinese Jamaican.

== Biography ==
In 1969, Lloyd A. Chin-Loy, Herman's half-brother, opened Aquarius Record Store in Half Way Tree, Kingston, Jamaica. In the early 1970s, Lloyd Chin-Loy contracted Doug Rosser of Rosser Electronics, a notable studio engineer from Swansea, Wales, to build an innovative, state of the art 24-track recording studio - the first of its kind in Jamaica and probably the entire Caribbean region; and so was born Aquarius Recording Studio in the heart of Half Way Tree.

Lloyd Chin-Loy subsequently brought on board his half-brother Herman Chin-Loy, who ran the retail end of the business. Herman dabbled in producing. His earliest productions were quirky, innovative instrumentals, using musicians such as Lloyd Charmers and The Hippy Boys on tracks such as "African Zulu", "Shang I", "Reggae In The Fields", "Invasion", and "Inner Space". He was the first producer to use the Now Generation Band and the first to record Horace Swaby, whose recordings, like those of other keyboard players who recorded for Chin Loy, were released under the name "Augustus Pablo", the success of Swaby's releases causing the name to stick.

In the early 1970s, Herman Chin Loy also produced Dennis Brown, Alton Ellis, and Bruce Ruffin, whose "Rain" reached number 19 in the UK singles chart. Herman Chin-Loy was responsible for one of the first dub albums, Aquarius Dub, released in 1973, and mixed at Dynamic studio by Chin Loy himself. A follow-up, Aquarius Dub part 2, was released the next year.

Herman Chin-Loy returned to reggae productions in 1979, after a brief hiatus, scoring several hits in the early dancehall style with artists such as Little Roy and Ernest Wilson.
