= Jacob Miller (musician) =

Jamaican reggae artist (1952–1980)

- Miller (left) with Bob Marley

Background information
- Born: 4 May 1952; Mandeville, Jamaica
- Died: 23 March 1980 (aged 27) Kingston, Jamaica
- Genre: Reggae
- Instrument: Vocals
- Years active: 1968–1980
- Formerly of: Inner Circle

Jacob Miller (4 May 1952 – 23 March 1980) was a Jamaican reggae artist. His first recording session was with the producer Clement "Sir Coxsone" Dodd in the late 1960s. While pursuing a solo career, he became the lead singer for Inner Circle, a Jamaican roots reggae band. Miller recorded and toured with Inner Circle before he died in a car crash in early 1980 at age 27.

== Early life ==
Born in Mandeville, Jamaica, in 1952, he was the only son of Joan Ashman, a choir singer and pianist. Raised a Rastafari, Miller never knew his father. As a child, he was mainly raised by his great-aunt. His mother recounts him having an especially friendly personality. One day in Half Way Tree (a neighbourhood of Kingston, Jamaica), he threw all his money in the air to give away to friends. According to his mother, he had a strong inclination toward music—often playing rhythms with his hands or drumsticks on pots, pans, and various items. In 1960, at the age of eight, he moved to Kingston, the capital and largest city of Jamaica.

== First recordings ==
The move to Kingston would prove to be a seminal event in his life. Although still very young, Miller began spending much of his spare time hanging around the city's recording studios, most notably Clement "Sir Coxsone" Dodd's now-famous Studio One. He was hoping to become the studio's next big child star.

At just thirteen years old, he recorded three songs at Studio One for Dodd, most notably "Love is a Message". The two brothers and owners of the Rockers sound system, Horace and Garth Swaby, played the song often around the time of its release (Horace would later become famous under the stage name Augustus Pablo). The song did not garner any real success, nor did it get much attention from Dodd; however it resulted in Horace Swaby befriending Miller and sparking an interest in him as a musician with potential.

== Musical career ==
After the Swaby brothers launched their own label in 1972, Horace—who had taken the stage name Augustus Pablo—recorded a version of "Love is a Message" called "Keep on Knocking" in 1974. In the next year and a half, Miller recorded five more songs for Pablo, "Baby I Love You So", "False Rasta", "Who Say Jah No Dread", "Each One Teach One", and "Girl Named Pat", each of which became a Rockers classic with King Tubby's dubs on their b-sides. These singles developed Miller's reputation as a great singer, and their success ultimately drew Inner Circle to hire him as a replacement lead singer.

Inner Circle was an emerging reggae group made popular playing covers of American Top 40 hits. Band leader Roger Lewis said Jacob Miller was "always happy and jovial. He always made jokes. Everyone liked jokes." Adding Miller as lead singer, the band's lineup was Roger Lewis on guitar, Ian Lewis on bass, Bernard "Touter" Harvey on keyboards, and Rasheed McKenzie on drums. Coining Miller as Jacob "Killer" Miller, the group continued to build popularity. In 1976, Inner Circle signed with Capitol Records. They released two albums, Reggae Thing in 1976 and Ready for the World in 1977.

At the same time, Miller continued pursuing a solo career, recording "Forward Jah Jah Children", "Girl Don't Come" produced by Gussie Clarke, and "I'm a Natty" produced by Joe Gibbs. "I'm a Natty" is a cover of the Wailers song "Soul Rebel" from their album Soul Rebels. "I'm a Natty" features sampling from the Wailers' original track and its lyrics changed by Miller. He earned second place in Jamaica's 1976 Festival Song competition with the song "All Night 'Till Daylight" and produced his first solo album in 1976, Tenement Yard. While most of Miller's solo work was backed by Inner Circle members, his preferred rockers style diverged from the tendency of Inner Circle to experiment with other genres, including pop, soul, funk and disco.

The track which has brought Miller the most lasting recognition is the dub reggae hit "King Tubby Meets The Rockers Uptown" with Augustus Pablo, a dub of "Baby I Love You So", engineered by King Tubby. AllMusic called Miller's vocal version, "Baby I Love You So", "a masterpiece", and wrote: "It says much about King Tubby's genius that his phenomenal dub of this number would eclipse Jacob Miller's own sublime vocal version". Decades later in 2004, the popular Grand Theft Auto video game franchise would use the dub music version, "King Tubby Meets Rockers Uptown", in the game Grand Theft Auto: San Andreas on their in-game reggae radio station K-Jah West.

Other notable tracks featuring Miller's vocals with Augustus Pablo's music and/or dubs include "Keep on Knocking", "False Rasta", and "Who Say Jah No Dread". The album Who Say Jah No Dread features two versions of each of these tracks; the original and a dub engineered by King Tubby.

== Acting and personality ==
Miller made an eponymous cameo appearance in the cult classic roots reggae film Rockers, alongside several roots reggae musicians including Gregory Isaacs and Burning Spear. In Rockers, Miller plays a singer for a hotel's house band—which is in fact Inner Circle—who are joined on drums by the film's eponymous hero, Leroy "Horsemouth" Wallace (himself a musician). The band plays a shortened, live version of Inner Circle's hit "Tenement Yard" during a scene. The film depicts Miller as a fun-loving and eccentric reggae singer who loves to play, eat, and sing.

== 1978: The One Love Peace Concert and Heartland Reggae (film) ==
In what were possibly his greatest performances of all time, Miller appeared at the One Love Peace Concert in 1978. The "Peace Concert" took place at the National Stadium in Kingston, Jamaica, on 22 April 1978, along with many of the most popular reggae acts of the day. Bob Marley, Peter Tosh, Bunny Wailer, U-Roy, Judy Mowatt, Dennis Brown, Althea and Donna, and many more roots reggae artists and locally famous Rastafari were in attendance. The event drew countrywide attention. Rising tensions between the two dominant political parties, the Jamaica Labor Party and the People's National Party, had many Jamaicans worried the concert would erupt into violence. Two bitter political rivals—Edward Seaga and incumbent prime minister Michael Manley—were to meet onstage and shake hands in front of Miller and other artists. Inner Circle wrote a song specially for the occasion titled "Peace Treaty", which was a reggae interpretation of the popular folk tune "When Johnny Comes Marching Home".

Jacob Miller and Inner Circle sets are featured prominently in the concert documentary film Heartland Reggae, which showcases the musical performances at the "One Love Peace Concert", and chronicles the historical event of the aforementioned two political rivals shaking hands onstage. Miller played two separate sets at the concert—one at night on the main stage opening for Bob Marley and the Wailers, and during the daytime the following day on a small stage in an open field near the National Stadium. In both sets, Miller and Inner Circle played their new "Peace Treaty" song. During Inner Circle's daytime set on a smaller stage nearby—as highlighted in the film Heartland Reggae—Miller brazenly donned a policeman's hat and lit an enormous spliff (until 2015 cannabis was strictly illegal in Jamaica), followed by cheers of delight from the audience.

== Later life and death ==
In March 1980, Jacob Miller went with Bob Marley and Island Records founder Chris Blackwell to Brazil, to celebrate Island opening new offices in South America. Not long after returning to Jamaica on Sunday, 23 March 1980, Miller and one of his sons died in a car accident on Hope Road in Kingston, Jamaica. Miller and Inner Circle had been preparing for an American tour with Bob Marley and the Wailers, and the next album, Mixed Up Moods, had been recorded before his death. The papers praised Miller in the announcement of his death, saying, "He took the world by storm and would be missed for his playfulness, gaiety and laughter." Additionally, Archbishop Yeshaq of the Ethiopian Orthodox Church who hosted his funeral service said that "Miller had a desire to help those in the ghetto [...] and made a plea for man to stop destroying his own brothers and sisters."

Jacob Miller was the cousin of British reggae artist Maxi Priest. Every year his Christmas album goes on heavy rotation during the holiday season in Jamaica, and is enjoyed amongst Jamaicans abroad as well.
