= Clive Chin =

Jamaica Music Producer

Clive Chin (born 14 May 1954 in Kingston, Jamaica) is a Hakka Chinese Jamaican record producer whose work includes recordings by the Wailers, Dennis Brown, Lee Perry and Black Uhuru, among others. Chin was a pioneer in the establishment of dub as a standalone musical form. He is the eldest son of Vincent "Randy" Chin.

== Biography ==
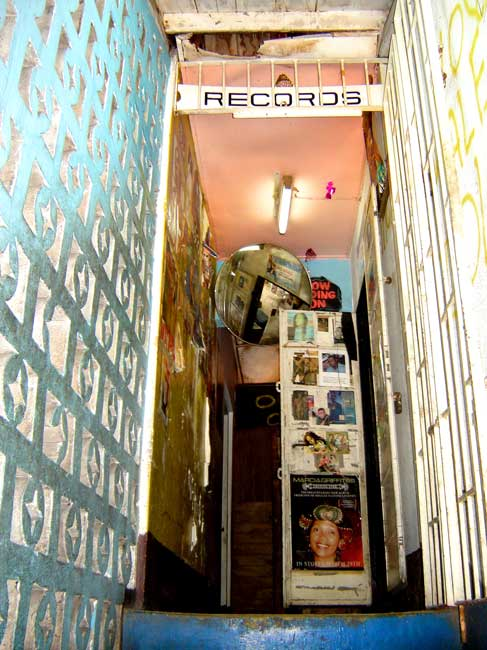
Randy's record shop

He began working at Randy's Record Store, his father's business, as a teenager, and helped make the associated studio, Randy's Studio 17, one of the most important Jamaican studios of the early 1970s.

Chin's first major commercial success was "Java", an international hit by Augustus Pablo. He had further local hits with Dennis Brown's "Cheater" and Junior Byles' "King of Babylon" and produced Pablo's debut album, This Is Augustus Pablo. Chin produced the Java Java Dub album in 1973, which he claims was the first ever dub album. Further local hits followed with Carl Malcolm's "Miss Wire Waist" and "Fattie Bum Bum", which, with the help of Jonathan King, became a UK chart hit in 1975, reaching number 8.

After his family business moved to New York City, Chin spent some fifteen years running a Jamaican restaurant in Queens. He began producing again in 1998. In 2007, Chin started a VP Records imprint, 17 North Parade, to reissue some of the historic Randy's releases.
