= Wayne Wade =

Jamaican singer, songwriter and musician (born 1959)

- Born: 19 March 1959 (age 66); Kingston, Jamaica
- Occupations: Singer; songwriter; musician
- Years active: 1975–present
- Musical career
- Genres: Reggae
- Instruments: Vocals
- Labels: VP

Wayne Wade (born 19 March 1959) is a Jamaican singer, songwriter and musician.

== Biography ==
Born in Kingston, Jamaica, Wade attended Excelsior High School from 1972 to 1976. His career began in the mid-1970s, working with Yabby You, 1976's "Black Is Our Colour" immediately achieving success in Jamaica. His debut album, Black Is Our Colour was released in 1976, and was followed by further hits with cover versions of The Paragons' "Happy Go Lucky Girl" and "On The Beach". This was followed by further albums Evil Woman (1978), Dancing Time, and Fire Fire (both 1979), before Wade moved on to work with Dillinger, recording "Five Man Army" together with Dillinger, The Tamlins, Al Campbell, and Trinity. He recorded for Joe Gibbs, hitting the UK reggae chart in 1980 with "After You" and "Natty Contractor". In 1981, Wade worked with Linval Thompson, releasing a string of singles including "Round The World", "Tell Me What's Going On", "Poor and Humble", and "Down in Iran". He then emigrated to The Netherlands, and signed a deal with Epic Records. He scored a hit in 1992 with "Love You Too Much"

In 2011, Wade performed at the One Love Peace Festival in London with other artists including Sean Paul, Busta Rhymes, Shaggy, Gyptian, Aswad, Third World, Etana, King Sounds and John Holt.

Wade currently resides in Miami, Florida, and continues to perform, record and release records.

== Discography ==
- Black is Our Colour (1976)
- Evil Woman (1978)
- Dancing Time (1978)
- Fire Fire (1979)
- Poor and Humble (1982)
- Looking for Love (1985)
- Respect Due Always (1986)
- Innocent Man (1993)
