= Randy Chin =

- Born: Vincent G. Chin; 3 October 1937; Kingston, Jamaica
- Died: 2 February 2003 (aged 65) Fort Lauderdale, Florida, US
- Genres: Reggae
- Occupations: Record producer, entrepreneur
- Labels: Randy's, VP

Vincent "Randy" Chin (3 October 1937 – 2 February 2003) was a Jamaican record producer and entrepreneur who ran the Randy's shop, recording studio, and record label, later moving to New York City and setting up the VP Records empire, now the world's largest independent label and distributor of Caribbean music.

== Biography ==
Chin was the son of a carpenter who left mainland China for a brief stay in Cuba, and then permanently settled in the 1920s in Jamaica. As a teenager in the early 1950s, Vincent oversaw the stocking and maintenance of jukeboxes in the island's bars for Isaac Issa, a prominent Syrian-Jamaican businessman. He kept the excess and replaced records and used them to open up his Randy's Records store on the corner of East and Tower streets in Kingston in 1958 on (the name coming from an American record store that sponsored an R&B radio show that could be picked up on the island). His son, Clive Chin, explained: "He kept dem records, and that was the springboard of his business, y'know?".

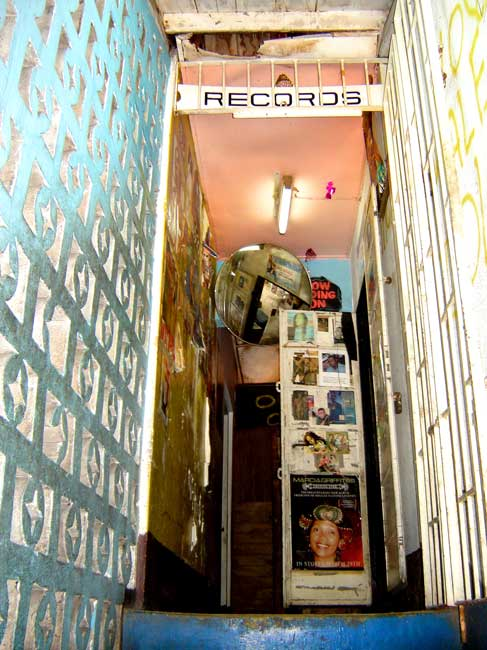
Randy's record shop

He began recording local artists, becoming one of the first to issue locally recorded music on the island. Early successes as a producer included ska singles by calypso singer Lord Creator, and one of the first singles issued by Island Records was Creator's "Independent Jamaica" in 1962, which was produced by Chin. Other early hits included releases by Basil Gabbidon, Jackie Opel, John Holt, and the duo Alton & Eddie (Alton Ellis and Eddie Perkins). In 1962, Chin relocated the store to a former ice cream parlour at 16–17 North Parade, and he and his wife Patricia set up a recording studio above the shop, which became known locally as Studio 17. By the early 1970s, engineer Errol Thompson had upgraded the studio with more modern equipment, and Clive took a lead production role, with the house band, "Randy's All-Stars", including among its members Wailers bassist and keyboard player Aston "Familyman" Barrett and Tyrone Downie, drummer Sly Dunbar, and a young keyboard player named Horace Swaby, later better known as Augustus Pablo. The studio proved popular with many of Jamaica's leading producers. Lee "Scratch" Perry recorded several tracks there with Bob Marley and the Wailers 1970–71, and other major stars to record there included Gregory Isaacs, Dennis Brown, Burning Spear, and Johnny Nash. The studio was later upgraded to 16 tracks, and was used by Vincent's eldest son Clive to record Augustus Pablo's This Is Augustus Pablo debut album in 1973.

The Chin family expanded their business interests into the United States, with the opening of branches of Randy's run by Vincent's brothers Victor and Keith. The family later began pressing records and moved into distribution. In 1979, Chin closed the Randy's studio and moved to New York and with his wife Patricia, opening the VP Records (the initials of Vincent and Patricia) store and label in Queens. VP became the US's largest reggae record company, and later acquired Greensleeves Records, becoming the world's largest independent label and distributor of Caribbean music. In 2002, the label later formed a distribution/marketing partnership with Atlantic Records.

Vincent Chin moved to Miami before retiring, his health deteriorating due to diabetes. He died on 2 February 2003.

== Discography ==
Albums

A three-CD set celebrating the history of Randy's records was released in 2008, fifty years after the label was started.

Contributing artist

- The Rough Guide to Dub (2005, World Music Network)
