= King Sounds =

- Born: Roy Livingstone Plummer c.1946 Jamaica
- Origin: Saint Elizabeth Parish, Jamaica
- Genres: Reggae
- Occupation: Singer/Songwriter/Producer
- Instrument: Vocals/Guitar
- Years active: 1975–present
- Labels: Grove Music, Grove Muzik (Grove Music), Island, King and the I, Viza Records

King Sounds, is a Jamaican reggae singer, song writer, musician, music producer who has released several studio albums from the late 1970s onwards.

== Biography ==
Born Roy Livingstone Plummer, c.1946 in Saint Elizabeth Parish, Jamaica, King Sounds emigrated to the UK in the late 1960s, where he entered the music business as a stage MC before embarking on his singing/producing career. As an MC for Reggae shows going by the name of 'Sounds', he impressed Alton Ellis so much that Ellis gave him the name 'King Sounds'. His debut single was "Rock and Roll Lullaby", released in 1977. He formed the Grove Music collective in Ladbroke Grove with Mikey Campbell. He performed regularly with artists such as Aswad and at the Notting Hill Carnival, with his band the Israelites featuring Clifton "Bigga" Morrison, Eddie "Tan Tan" Thornton, and Michael "Bammi" Rose. His first album was released on Grove Music, his second one was released on Grove music also on Island Records, then his 3rd and 4th albums were relealed on his King and the I label. His 5th, 6th, and 7th albums were released on his Viza Records label.

== Discography ==
ALBUMS

- Come Zion Side Happiness (1979) - Grove Music label
- Forward (1981) with the Israelites - Grove Muzik (Grove Music) label, also Island Records
- Moving Forward (1983), with the Israelites - King and the I label
- There Is a Reward (1985), with the Israelites - King and the I label
- Strength to Strength (1987) - Viza Records label
- I Shall Sing (1992) - Viza Records label
- Never Give Up (1998) - Viza Records label

SINGLES

- Spend One Night In A Babylon - Grove Music label
- They Keep Us Down In Poverty - Grove Music label
- They That Hate Us Wrongfully - Grove Music label
- Kill Them Dead - Grove Music label
- Look Into Yourself - Grove Music label
- Patches - Island Records label
- My Loving Friend - Grove Muzik (Grove Music) label
- Batman
- Brand New Child - Grove Muzik (Grove Music) label
- Baal - King and the I label
- Pada, Pada, Padaa - King and the I label
- Book of Rules - King and the I label
- There is a Reward - King and the I label
- You're My Pilot - King and the I label
- Love Bug - King and the I label
- Reggae Lover - Viza Records label
- I Really Don’t Want to Hurt You - Viza Records label
- Games People Play - Viza Records label
- Aids - Viza Records label
- I'll Do Anything for You - Viza Records label
- She Me Prefer - Viza Records label
- Would You Like - Viza Records label
- I Shall Sing - Viza Records label
- Never Give Up - Viza Records label
