= Augustus Pablo =

- Born: Horace Michael Swaby; 21 June 1953; St. Andrew, Jamaica
- Died: 18 May 1999 (aged 45) Kingston, Jamaica
- Genres: Roots reggae; dub
- Occupations: Musician; songwriter; producer
- Instruments: Melodica; guitar; organ; piano
- Years active: 1970s–1999

Horace Michael Swaby (21 June 1953 – 18 May 1999), also known as Augustus Pablo, was a Jamaican roots reggae and dub composer, performer, record producer, and multi-instrumentalist. He was active from the 1970s until his death. He was known for playing the melodica.

== Biography ==
He was born in St. Andrew, Jamaica, and learned to play the organ at the Kingston College School, where a girl lent him a melodica. He also met Herman Chin Loy, who after working at his cousin Leslie Kong's Beverley's record shop, had set up his own Aquarius store in Half Way Tree. Swaby recorded several tracks, including "Higgi Higgi", "East of the River Nile", "Song of the East" and "The Red Sea" between 1971 and 1973, for Chin-Loy's Aquarius Records. Chin Loy had previously used the name Augustus Pablo generically for keyboard instrumentals recorded by Lloyd Charmers and Glen Adams, and Swaby took the name for this recording.

He soon joined Now Generation (Mikey Chung's band) and played keyboard with them while his friend Clive Chin began his own career as a record producer. Pablo and Chin recorded "Java" (1972) together after Pablo quit Now Generation. He has recorded with Chin and Chin's uncle, Leonard Chin, and Lee Perry. Pablo formed the labels Hot Stuff, Message and Rockers (named after his brother's soundsystem, Rockers). Pablo's 1974 album This Is Augustus Pablo was recorded with Clive and Pat Chin. This was followed by a collaboration with King Tubby in their 1975's Ital Dub.

Pablo produced a number of songs in the 1970s, including "Black Star Liner" (with Fred Locks). He has also worked with Dillinger, I-Roy, Jacob Miller, the Immortals, Paul Blackman, Earl Sixteen, Roman Stewart, Lacksley Castell, the Heptones, Bob Marley, Delroy Wilson, Junior Delgado, Horace Andy and Freddy McKay.

With Jacob Miller, he recorded "Baby I Love You So" in 1974. Pablo's dub version of the song, titled "King Tubby Meets Rockers Uptown", was mixed by sound engineer King Tubby. It was named the 266th greatest song of all time by Rolling Stone.

Pablo later released a few LPs, including King Tubbys Meets Rockers Uptown (1976) and Hugh Mundell's Africa Must Be Free by 1983. This was followed by East of the River Nile (1978), Original Rockers (1979) and another album, Rockers Meets King Tubbys in a Firehouse. In 1980, he appeared on the soundtrack of the documentary DOA. He released Rising Sun in 1986. He also toured throughout the world, recording a live album in Tokyo in 1987.

In 1997, he played melodica on Primal Scream's single "Star".

Augustus Pablo died as a result of a collapsed lung on 18 May 1999. He had been suffering for some time from the nerve disorder myasthenia gravis.

== Personal life ==
Pablo was a Rasta. His son, Addis Pablo, followed him into a career in music, as did his daughter, Isis Swaby.

== Selected discography ==
=== Albums ===
- This Is...Augustus Pablo (1974)
- Ital Dub (1974)
- Thriller (1975)
- King Tubbys Meets Rockers Uptown (1976)
- East of the River Nile (1977)
- Original Rockers (1979)
- Africa Must Be Free by... 1983 Dub (1979)
- Rockers Meets King Tubbys in a Firehouse (1980)
- Authentic Golden Melodies (1980)
- Dubbing in a Africa (1981)
- Earth's Rightful Ruler (1982)
- King David's Melody (1983)
- Rising Sun (1986)
- Rebel Rock Reggae (1986)
- Rockers Come East (1987)
- Eastman Dub (1988)
- Presents Rockers Story (1989)
- Blowing with the Wind (1990)
- Presents Rockers International Showcase (1991)
- Heartical Chart (1993)
- Meets King Tubby at the Control in Roots Vibes (1996)
- Red Sea (1998)
- Let's Get Started / Eastman Dub (1998)
- Valley of Jehosaphat (1999)
- El Rocker's (2000)
- The Great Pablo (2000)
- Dubbing with the Don (2001)
- Jah Inspiration (2001)
- Skanking with Pablo: Melodica for Hire 1971–77 (2002)
- In Fine Style: 7" & 12" Selection 1973–79 (2003)
- The Essential Augustus Pablo (2005)
- Augustus Pablo Meets Lee Perry & the Wailers Band (Rare Dubs 1970–1971) (2006)
- The Mystic World of Augustus Pablo: The Rockers Story (2008)
- Born to Dub You (2014)
- Augustus Pablo Presents Rockers International (2015)
- Augustus Pablo Presents Rockers International 2 (2015)
- Augustus Pablo Original Rockers (2016)
- One Step Dub (2020)
- Ancient Harmonies (2020)

=== Contributing artist ===
- The Rough Guide to Reggae (1997, World Music Network)
