= David Katz (author) =

American journalist and author (born 1965)

- Born: 1965 (age 60–61); San Francisco, California, U.S.
- Education: San Francisco State University (BA); Goldsmiths, University of London (MA)
- Occupations: Author; documentary radio and film producer
- Known for: Writings on reggae, dub and dancehall
- Notable work: People Funny Boy: The Genius of Lee "Scratch" Perry (2000); Solid Foundation: An Oral History of Reggae (2003); Dub Revolution: Jamaica's Sonic Innovators and the Birth of Remix Culture (2026)
- Website: www.davidkatzreggae.com

David Katz (born 1965) is an American author and documentary radio and film producer. He has been described as "one of the world's foremost authorities on reggae, dub, and dancehall". Originally from San Francisco, California, he has been a resident of London in England for many years.

== Biography ==
Katz was born in 1965 in San Francisco, California, and raised in the Bay Area, where he was exposed to reggae as a teen from the local radio station, KTIM.

He obtained a BA in English Literature from San Francisco State University and moved to London, England, in the 1980s, where he was retained as Lee Perry's biographer, and later completed an MA in Media Studies at Goldsmiths, University of London.

== Career ==
Katz is the author of People Funny Boy: The Genius of Lee "Scratch" Perry, Solid Foundation: An Oral History of Reggae, Dub Revolution: Jamaica's Sonic Innovators and the Birth of Remix Culture and Caribbean Lives: Jimmy Cliff.

He has contributed to many other books on music and culture, including the Rough Guide to Reggae, A Tapestry of Jamaica, Caribbean Popular Music: An Encyclopedia, Keep On Running: The Story of Island Records and Mashup: The Birth of Modern Culture. His writing and photographs have appeared in many international publications, including The Guardian, The Telegraph, The Independent, Newsweek, Mojo, Q, Wax Poetics, Riddim, Caribbean Beat and Murder Dog. Katz has coordinated and annotated more than 100 retrospective collections of Jamaican music, has released original records in the UK and France, and has co-hosted reggae radio programmes on three continents. In 2013, he was invited to present at the University of the West Indies' 2013 International Reggae Conference.

Katz has produced documentaries for Afropop Worldwide/Public Radio International and contributed to radio and television documentaries for the BBC, Channel 4 and Arte and was a music consultant on the feature film Dreaming Lhasa.

Katz holds a regular residency as a disc jockey, presenting the "Dub Me Always" reggae vinyl nights at the Ritzy in Brixton, London, and has played at venues and festivals throughout Europe, the US, Japan and Brazil. He has also co-chaired panel discussions with performers, journalists and filmmakers at various music festivals and given presentations at different international universities and other venues.

== Critical reaction ==
In an Uncut review of the revised and expanded edition of People Funny Boy published by White Rabbit, Jim Wirth said:

Concluding with the producer's death aged 85 in August, this new edition of People Funny Boy: the Genius of Lee 'Scratch' Perry enhances an already impressive piece of research, capturing the cosmic quality of the reggae polymath's work without flinching from the entirely worldly problems that lurked behind it.

Mark Terrill, writing in Rain Taxi, said of the book People Funny Boy:

[R]eggae was more than just pop music; it was also a part of the culture, and no extensive discussion of reggae music would be complete without also addressing post-colonialism, Rastafarianism, Jamaican politics, and the music business itself, in particular the Jamaican/English axis. David Katz covers all of these issues and more in this comprehensive and highly-readable biography of Lee "Scratch" Perry, ... the result of years of research and interviews, ... Despite the obvious temptation to exploit the more sensational aspects of Scratch's life and career, Katz has written a factual, straightforward, yet lovingly compiled account of a highly eccentric character ... Katz's ability to balance detailed documentation with lively anecdotes provide for an absorbing yet entertaining read.

Mike Atherton, writing in Record Collector, said of the book People Funny Boy:

From this chaotic life and oeuvre, Katz manages to create an orderly and highly readable narrative, charting Perry's rise alongside Kingston’s musical heavy hitters Clement Dodd and Prince Buster, and his subsequent international success with The Upsetters. Exhaustive research and interviews with musicians and family members shed light on the driving forces that led Perry to create such hugely influential reggae in his Kingston garden studio, before throwing success away.

Regarding the book Solid Foundation, Colin Grant said in The Guardian:

More than a decade ago, David Katz drew on more than 300 first-hand interviews to tell a luminous story of reggae, entitled Solid Foundation.

A review in Spannered of the book Solid Foundation says:

This excellent collection of interviews by reggae historian David Katz is a significant step in the archiving of the formative years of Jamaica's most commercially successful and internationally recognised cultural export. Katz's work is vital, not least because the first exponents of the Jamaican boogie and ska sound of the early fifties which he focuses on initially are increasingly few in number. His project is a welcome contribution to the small number of well researched and persuasively written books on reggae. ... Katz's own narrative and the interviews themselves are full of compelling details ... Solid Foundation is necessarily incomplete and its account of the evolution of reggae is coloured by the affiliations and prejudices of Katz's interviewees (his own are clear from his neglect of dancehall, reggae's most vibrant contemporary form). But the patience and persistence required to assemble this kind of work clearly reflect the author's passion for reggae...

Jay Trachtenberg, writing in The Austin Chronicle, said of Solid Foundation:

The history of Jamaican popular music has been told a number of times before, perhaps most comprehensively by Steve Barrow in his Rough Guide to Reggae. One of the collaborators on that project was David Katz, a Californian now based in London, whose recent biography of Lee "Scratch" Perry was met with critical acclaim. Katz has done extensive research, interviewing more than 250 people in compiling this dense oral history... Katz has gathered a staggering amount of engrossing and entertaining information. He's at his best when using overlapping interviews to tell a particular story.

A review of Solid Foundation in Reggaezine said:

To some extent any book on reggae must rely on oral testimony, due to the absence of formal written documentation, but Solid Foundation is exactly what it says, built upon the author's 'formal interviews conducted with more than 250 of reggae's prime movers over 15 years'. This epic labour, pursued across the ghetto yards of West Kingston and the green hills of Jamaica's rural parishes, enables Katz to let the pioneers and innovators of the music speak for themselves with only the lightest authorial touch. ... Everyone is here, veteran singer Derrick Morgan, founder of Studio One Coxsone Dodd, pioneer DJ U Roy, even Eddie Seaga, leader of the Jamaican Labour Party, ex Prime Minister of Jamaica and, for many, an instigator of the political violence that plagues Jamaica to the present day. Their oral testimonies work with each other to form a composite picture of a fast moving and chaotic era obscure even to its own participants who, as in all revolutions, could never know their place in the bigger picture. ... books like Solid Foundation will represent a long overdue mark of respect. Many more books on the glories of Jamaican music will follow, but David Katz' will remain one of the very best.

Chris Menist, writing in With Guitars, said of Solid Foundation:

Despite the recent crop of books covering the history of reggae from myriad angles, there are many reasons to purchase 'Solid Foundation' by David Katz. Katz’s first book, 'People Funny Boy', tackled the tricky enigma of producer Lee Perry, and one might see 'Solid Foundation' as a widening of the viewfinder putting Perry’s story, alongside countless others, into context. ... From the outset, Katz's thorough research puts paid to certain n apocryphal tales, and sets the music and people of Jamaica into context. ... Having interviewed over 250 people for the book, Katz has a job on his hands keeping to a strict narrative, and he by and large succeeds. Occasionally the story creaks under the sheer weight of detail he has uncovered, but he always manages to bring it back to its themes before it descends into a mere factual list.

== Bibliography ==
- Katz, David (2000). People Funny Boy: The Genius of Lee "Scratch" Perry. Omnibus. ISBN 978-1846094439.
- Katz, David (2003). Solid Foundation: An Oral History of Reggae. Hal Leonard Corporation. ISBN 978-1908279309.
- Katz, David (2011). Caribbean Lives: Jimmy Cliff. Macmillan. ISBN 978-1904955962.
- Katz, David (2 July 2026). Dub Revolution: Jamaica's Sonic Innovators and the Birth of Remix Culture. UK: White Rabbit. ISBN 9781399619141.
