= Leroy Wallace =

Jamaican drummer (born 1950)

Leroy "Horsemouth" Wallace
- Also known as: Mad Roy
- Born: 22 August 1950 (age 75)
- Origin: Jamaica
- Genres: Reggae
- Instrument: drums

Leroy "Horsemouth" Wallace (born 22 August 1950) is a Jamaican drummer who worked for several years at Studio One, and has worked with numerous reggae artists including The Gladiators, Inner Circle, Prince Far I, Sound Dimension, Gregory Isaacs, Burning Spear, Ijahman Levi, Bruno Blum and Pierpoljak. He starred as himself in the lead role of the film Rockers. Wallace attended the Alpha Boys School in the 1960s and early 1970s, where he studied under Lennie Hibbert. Wallace also joined The Skatalites when they reformed in the mid-1970s. Wallace has been credited with inventing the 'Rockers' rhythm.

He has also recorded as a DJ on a number of tracks, for example "Herb Vendor", produced by Lee Perry, and "Universal Love", released under the pseudonym Mad Roy.

== Solo discography ==
- Original Armageddon Dub, Stable One
- Far Beyond

== Filmography ==
Leroy Wallace starred in the 1978 film Rockers, alongside Gregory Isaacs, Burning Spear, Big Youth, Dillinger, and Jacob Miller of Inner Circle.
