= Eric Rachmany =

American musician

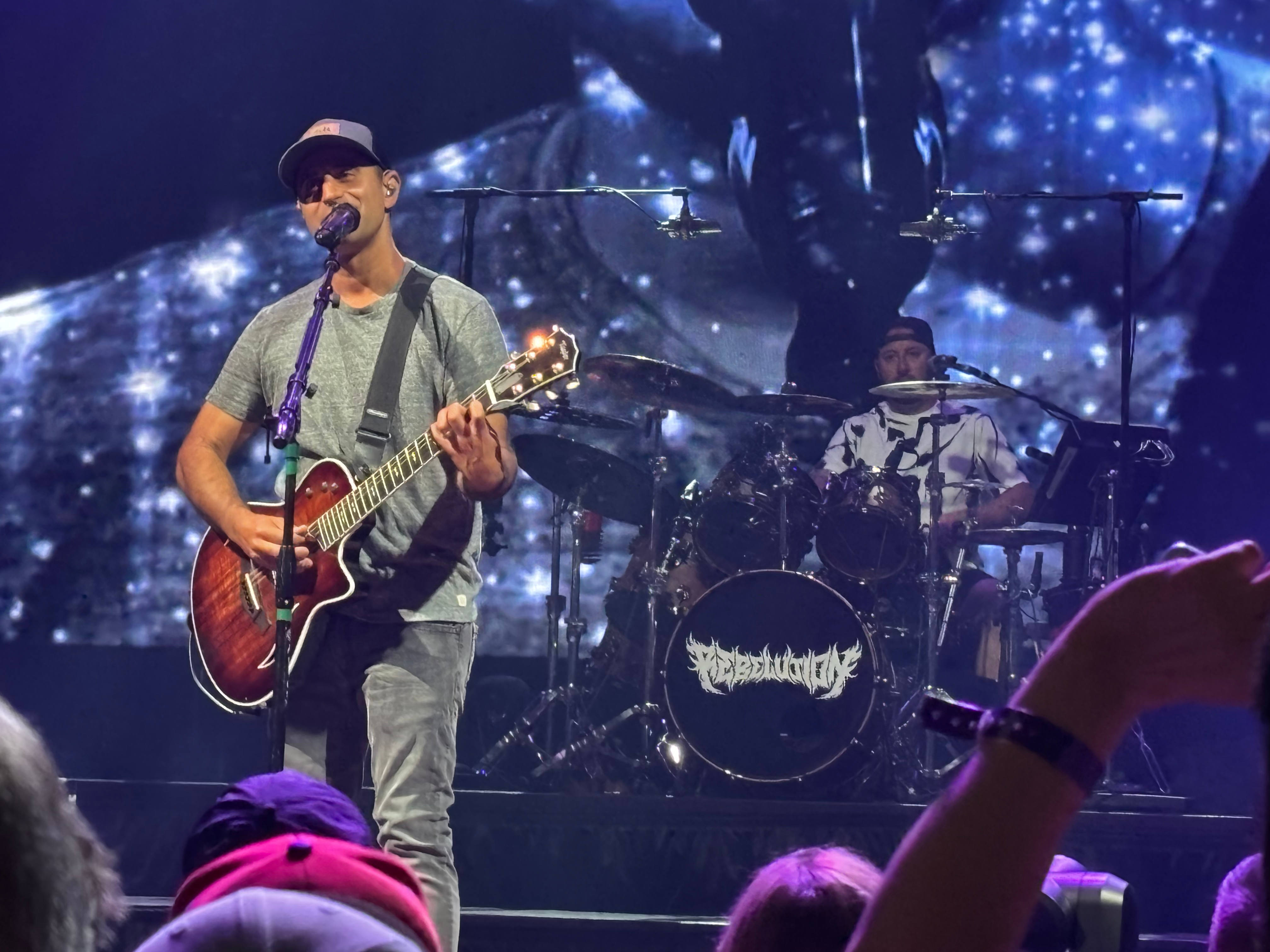
- Eric Rachmany performs with Rebelution at Ovation Hall in Atlantic City on June 1, 2024.

Background information
- Born: San Francisco, California
- Genres: Reggae rock; dub
- Instruments: Guitar; vocals
- Years active: 2004–present
- Labels: 87 Music; Hill Kid; Raise Up Music; Red Distribution; Easy Star Records
- Member of: Rebelution; Unified Highway
- Website: https://www.ericrachmanymusic.com

Eric Rachmany (born May 15, 1984) is an American singer-songwriter from Isla Vista, California. He is best known as the lead singer of the reggae rock band Rebelution as well as its side project, Unified Highway.

== Career ==
Rachmany was born in San Francisco, California to an Iranian-American family. His father was born in Iran while his mother was born in New York to an Iranian family. He considers Don Carlos and the Dave Matthews Band among his biggest musical influences. He began his musical career in 2004 when he founded the band Rebelution at the age of 20 with students from the University of California, Santa Barbara.

In 2014 he started a side project of Rebelution called Unified Highway with San Francisco-based artist DJ Amp Live, formerly of Zion I.

In 2023, Rachmany embarked on a solo tour with touring member Kyle Ahern in which they performed acoustic versions of his music.

== Personal life ==
Rachmany is married and has a kid, who was born in 2020. His wife is from Guam.

== Discography ==
=== With Rebelution ===
==== Studio albums ====
- Courage to Grow (2007)
- Bright Side of Life (2010)
- Peace of Mind (2012)
- Count Me In (2014)
- Falling Into Place (2016)
- Free Rein (2018)
- In the Moment (2021)

==== EPs/Live albums ====
- Rebelution (2006)
- Remix EP (2011)
- Count Me In Remix EP (2015)
- Live at Red Rocks (2016)
- Live in St. Augustine (2022)

=== Unified Highway albums ===
- Unified Highway (2016)
- Headlines (2020)
