= Lou Perez =

Lou Perez may refer to:

- Lou Perez (wrestler)
- Lou Perez (musician)
- Lou Perez (comedian)
