= Eddie Drennon =

American songwriter

- Also known as: Eddie Dee
- Born: Edward Allen Drennen; 1940 (age 85–86); Newark, New Jersey, United States
- Genres: R&B, pop, disco, Latin music, salsa, jazz, funk, charanga
- Occupations: Musician, songwriter, record producer, arranger
- Instrument: Violin
- Years active: 1960s–present
- Website: eddiedrennon.com

Eddie Drennon (born Edward Allen Drennen; 1940) is an American musician, songwriter, record producer, and arranger. His range of musical genres has included R&B, pop, disco, Latin music, salsa, jazz, funk, and charanga. He is best known for his transatlantic hit single, "Let's Do the Latin Hustle", recorded in 1975 with his then backing group, B.B.S. Unlimited. The track was written, produced and arranged by Drennon. Other works of that period, including "Do What You Gotta Do", have been sampled by more contemporary musicians such as Grandmaster Flash, The Avalanches, Biz Markie, and Shaggy.

== Life and career ==
Drennon was born in Newark, New Jersey, United States, and after leaving school began working with local bands. From 1959 to 1963, he studied violin techniques with Louia Vaughn Jones and music composition with Mark Fax at Howard University in Washington, D.C. Initially a working musician in Washington, he was encouraged by bandleader Lou Perez to move to New York City in the mid-1960s, and worked with Pupi Legarreta, Super Tipica De Estrellas, Tipica Ideal and Charanga America.

He became Bo Diddley's music director in 1966, playing as his electric violinist until 1967. He performed on one track on Bo Diddley's, His Best album. Drennon also operated as a sideman for Mongo Santamaría, Ray Barretto and Ike & Tina Turner.

In 1975, he met and started working with record producer Joe Bana, who owned Friends & Co. Records. Drennon's fusion of Latin and disco brought his major hit, "Let's Do the Latin Hustle", which was also the first hit for the label. The track entered the US Billboard R&B chart, peaking at number 36. It also reached number 4 on the Hot Dance Club Songs chart. It peaked at number 20 in the UK Singles Chart in March 1976. A cover version of the track by the M and O Band reached number 16 in the UK chart, slightly out performing the original. With his backing ensemble B.B.S. Unlimited, Drennon recorded three albums between 1975 and 1979 for Casablanca Records. AllMusic noted that "Drennon's second Casablanca album [It Don't Mean a Thing] uses the same formula as the first that spawned his biggest hit "Latin Hustle": Latinish pop rhythms topped by female vocals and accented with strings. The title track is a hustle gem, truly worthy."

Drennon continued to work as a violinist on recording sessions in New York. He also composed, arranged and produced for Esther Williams ("Last Night Changed It All"). In 1981 and 1982, he produced the New York based salsa and charanga band, Orquesta Novel. In 1983, he released Eddie Drennon and Charanga Soul. Drennon scored a scene for the film, In the Line of Fire (1993), and composed the music for the 1997 Helen Hayes based musical, Torn from the Headlines. His string quartet played on Soldiers of Jah Army's Get Wiser and the Get Wiser Live DVD (2006); and the 2009 Born in Babylon album.

In the 1980s and 1990s, Drennon worked as a teacher at Fairleigh Dickinson University and Howard University, as well as acting as music director at the Everyday Theater in Washington, D.C. He currently plays with the Umoja String Quartet, and serves on the faculty at the George Washington University and Levine School of Music.

== Discography ==
=== Albums ===
Year	Title	US R&B	Record label	Notes
1975	Collage	53	Friends & Co.	Despite being a LP, it also appeared in the Billboard Hot Dance Club Songs chart
1977	Would You Dance to My Music	—	Casablanca	
1978	It Don't Mean a Thing	—	Casablanca	
1983	Eddie Drennon and Charanga Soul	—	Kim Records	

=== Singles ===
Year	Title	Peak chart positions		
Year	Title	US R&B	US Dance	UK
1975	"Let's Do the Latin Hustle"	36	4	20
1975	"Do It Nice and Easy"	—	14	—
1976	"Let's Do It Again"	—	10	—
1976	"Please Stay"	—	10	—
1977	"Would You Dance to My Music"	—	—	—
1978	"Disco Jam"	—	—	—
"—" denotes releases that did not chart.
