= Soja (disambiguation) =

Sōja is a city in Okayama Prefecture, Japan.

Soja may also refer to:

== People ==
- Edward Soja (1940–2015), American geographer and urban planner
- Jean André Soja (born 1946), Malagasy politician
- Soja Jovanović (1922–2002), Yugoslavian film and theater director

== Other places ==
- Sōja Station, a railway station in Sōja, Okayama
  - Higashi-Sōja Station
  - Gumma-Sōja Station

== Plants ==
- Soja, an alternate spelling of soya, as in soya bean
- Soja, a synonym of the legume genus Glycine

== Music ==
- SOJA ("Soldiers of Jah Army"), a reggae band from Virginia, USA
  - SOJA (EP), a 2000 release by the band

== Shrines ==
- Sōja or Sōsha, a Shinto term referring to a "combined shrine" where all of the kami in an area are worshipped together
- Many shrines of this type have it in their name
  - Mikawa Sōja located in Toyokawa, Aichi
  - Hida Sōja located in Takayama, Gifu
  - Sōja Shrine located in Maebashi, Gunma
  - Sō Shrine located in Obama, Fukui
  - Sōja Daijingū located in Echizen, Fukui
  - Sōsha located in Nanao, Ishikawa
  - Sōsha Shrine located in Sado, Niigata
  - Sō Shrine located in Nantan, Kyoto
  - Mimasaka Sōjagū located in Tsuyama, Okayama
  - Bizen-no-Kuni Sōjagū located in Okayama, Okayama
  - Bitchū-no-kuni Sōjagū located in Sōja, Okayama
  - Sōsha-gū (subshrine of Iminomiya Shrine) located in Shimonoseki, Yamaguchi
  - Hachiman Sōsha Ryo Shrine located in Tokushima, Tokushima
  - Sōja Shrine located in Sakaide, Kagawa
  - Sōsha Hachiman-gū located in Miyako, Fukuoka

== See also ==
- Sojas, a city in Zanjan Province, Iran
- Soia (disambiguation)
- Soya (disambiguation)
- Soy (disambiguation)
- Soi (disambiguation)
- SOJ (disambiguation)
