= The Green (band) =

Hawaiian reggae rock band

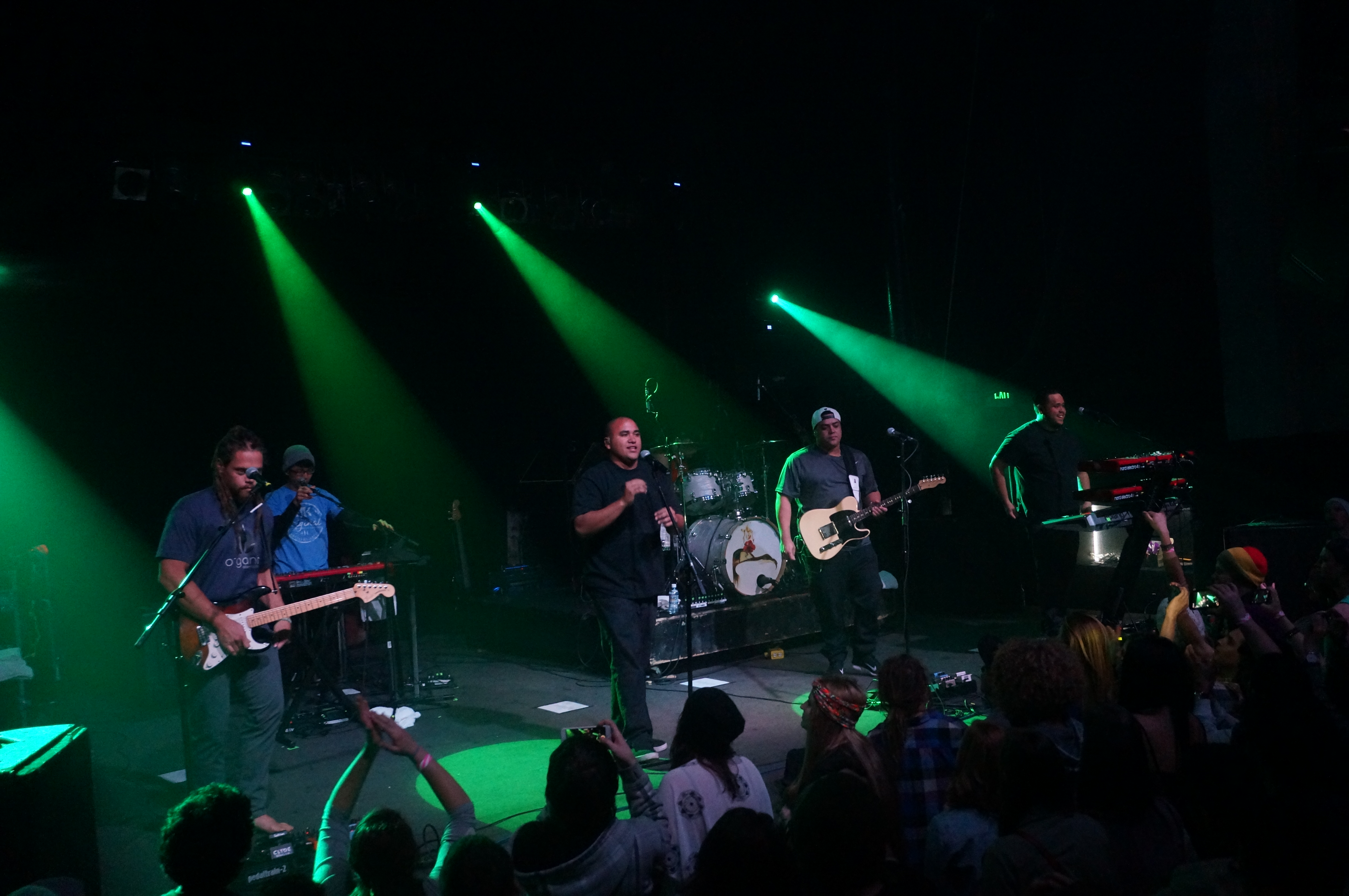
- The Green performing in 2015

Background information
- Origin: Oahu, Hawaii
- Genres: Roots, Reggae, Hawaiian, Rock, Pop
- Years active: 2009–Present
- Label: Easy Star Records
- Members: Caleb Keolanui; Ikaika Antone; Zion Thompson; Brad "BW" Watanabe; Jordan Espinoza
- Past members: JP Kennedy, Leslie Ludiazo
- Website: thegreen808.com

The Green is a reggae band formed in 2009 from Oahu, Hawaii. Their sound blends dub-heavy roots reggae, smooth lovers' rock, and contemporary pop and rock with indigenous Hawaiian musical/lyrical references. The current band consists of Caleb Keolanui on vocals, Ikaika Antone on keys/vocals, Zion Thompson on guitar/vocals, Brad Watanabe on Bass/vocals and Jordan Espinoza on drums/vocals. The group has released five full-length studio albums to date.

== History ==
=== Formation (2009) ===
The Green formed on Oahu, Hawaii in 2009. What makes this band unique is having four lead singers. The core-four singer/songwriters came together first with the band's frontman Caleb Keolanui and former guitarist J.P. Kennedy (who are first cousins and played together in a band named Next Generation). Along came the other two core singers, guitarist Zion Thompson and keyboardist Ikaika Antone who had been in a band called Stir Crazy. When their band split up, the pair came together with the cousins, and all missing their home of Hawaii, formed The Green. Kennedy explains the band name, "We wanted a name that didn't really point you in any direction. It's just a color, it makes you figure out what you want it to mean." Then they added songwriter Brad Watanabe on bass and producer Leslie Ludiazo on drums.

With four distinct voices with the ability of four separate songwriting talents, and musicianship of "pop-burnished roots reggae style" that they cooked up, The Green quickly became a popular local band on the island.

=== Self-Titled Album (2010) ===
The band released their self-titled debut album The Green on February 2, 2010. The album's single, "Love I" was the band's breakthrough single on Hawaiian radio, and set a Billboard Reggae Chart record by remaining on the chart for 69 straight weeks. The album was also named iTunes Best Reggae Album of 2010 and finished the year as the #9 album on the 2010 Billboard's Year End Reggae Chart alongside artists Rebelution, Matisyahu and Bob Marley.

=== Love & Affection, Ways & Means (2011) ===
On August 9, 2011, The Green released an EP titled Love & Affection. The EP quickly secured the #1 spot on the iTunes Reggae chart, passing Bob Marley, Shaggy and other heavy hitters along the way. The EP featured four tracks to be later seen on their sophomore album Ways & Means.

On October 25, 2011, The Green's second album Ways & Means was released and spent four weeks at #1 on Billboard's Reggae Chart and won Best Reggae Album at Hawaii's 2011 Na Hoku Hanohano Awards. With the success the band was finding with their recorded music, they were able to embark on a full touring schedule, supporting bands such as Rebelution, Iration, SOJA and Damian Marley. The band also performed at festivals like the Wakarusa and Sierra Nevada World Music Festival.

=== Hawaiʻi '13 (2013) ===
In 2013, The Green teamed up with producer Danny Kalb to record their third album, Hawaiʻi '13 at Hurley Studios in Costa Mesa, California. It was the band's first time working with an outside engineer and producer. They also brought in Joe Tomino, drummer from Dub Trio and for Matisyahu's backing band to be their session drummer. The album which was officially released on August 20, 2013 became the band's third straight album to top the Billboard Reggae chart, selling 4,960 copies in its first week of release. It was also named one of AllMusic's favorite reggae albums of 2013, and won several awards at the subsequent Na Hoku Hanohano Awards including Best Reggae Album and Artist of the Year. The band went on to perform at festivals worldwide, including California Roots Music and Arts Festival, Vans Warped Tour and One Love Festival New Zealand.

=== Marching Orders (2017) ===
On October 20, 2017, The Green released their fourth studio album, Marching Orders, through longtime label partner Easy Star Records. The album debuted at #1 on the Billboard Reggae charts and remained in the Top 10 for over 17 consecutive weeks, regaining the #1 spot multiple times during its run. The band's new album was once again awarded "Reggae Album of the Year" at the subsequent Na Hoku Hanohano Awards and won "Album of the Year" at the 2018 Island Music Awards. The band followed up their release with a winter tour that boasted sell-out shows across the mainland. In November 2018, The Green performed at several sold-out stadium shows in Honolulu with Bruno Mars.

=== Black & White (2019) ===
On March 22, 2019, The Green released their fifth album, Black & White, an acoustic take on their greatest hits. Most of the album was recorded at Hurley Studios, where they recorded Hawaiʻi '13. The album was mixed/mastered by Danny Kalb. The Green was awarded "Group of the Year" at the 2019 Island Music Awards.

=== "My Hawaiʻi" & The Hawaiʻi People Fund ===
On December 20, 2019, The Green released a single titled, "My Hawaiʻi" which featured fellow multiple time winners of Na Hoku Hanohano Awards Sean Naʻauao, Kaumakaiwa, and Kumu Hina. Since they started, The Green has been a vocal supporter of Hawaiian rights and a model of what it's like to be young, modern Hawaiian natives. And "My Hawaiʻi" is their latest anthem for the Hawaiian nation. The band and their label, Easy Star Records donated the proceeds from the track to The Hawaiʻi People's Fund (HPF), which has helped to support, build capacity, and amplify the impact of grassroots social change movements in Hawaii since 1972.

Ikaika Antone who co-wrote the song, explains, "'My Hawaiʻi' is about the ever changing landscape of Hawaiʻi. These changes we feel are often not in the best interest of the land or its people. It is a song that speaks of the beauty of Hawaiʻi, and of the importance to protect it. 'My Hawaiʻi' is inspired by the strength and courage of our Hawaiian people, and that we as stewards of this land set the right example, so that our keiki [children] may have the tools to continue to move Hawaiʻi in the right direction."

=== Brand New Eyes (2021) ===
The Green recorded their sixth studio album, Brand New Eyes, which was released on November 5, 2021. It features art by Hawaiian artist Kamea Hadar. Special guests include Alborosie, Gyptian, J Boog, and Keznamdi.

The Green describes Brand New Eyes as "an ode to our commitment to both our love of music and family." Their influence for naming the album: "After six albums and 12-plus years together as a band, much has changed but nothing as impactful as our growing ohana and us being able to see life through a new lens; the eyes of our children and loved ones."

In December 2021, The Green was nominated for the fans-choice "2021 Album of the Year" award by Surf Roots TV & Radio for their album Brand New Eyes. Voting was determined by Facebook, Instagram and Twitter users. This was the band's first time being nominated with the reggae rock streaming TV channel on Amazon Fire TV, Apple TV, and Roku.

On September 1, 2023, The Green released their third EP titled, Summertime, featuring three tracks.

== Lineup ==
=== Current members ===
- Caleb Keolanui – Lead Vocals (2009–Present)
- Zion Thompson – Guitar, Lead Vocals (2009–Present)
- Ikaika Antone – Keyboard, Lead Vocals (2009–Present)
- Brad "BW" Watanabe – Bass, Keyboard (2009–Present)
- Jordan Espinoza – Drums (2011–Present)

=== Past band members ===
- JP Kennedy – Guitar, Lead Vocals (2009–2022)
- Leslie Ludiazo – Drums (2009–2017), Producer (2017–2019)

== Discography ==
=== Studio albums ===
The Green Chart History
Year	Album	Label	Billboard peak
2010	The Green	Shee Handsome Devil Records	#9
2011	Ways & Means	Easy Star Records	#1
2013	Hawaiʻi 13	Easy Star Records	#1
2017	Marching Orders	Easy Star Records	#1
2021	Brand New Eyes	Easy Star Records	TBD
2026	Titles	Easy Star Records	TBD

=== EPs/Acoustic/Live albums ===
The Green Chart History
Year	Album	Label	Billboard peak
2011	Love & Affection EP	Easy Star Records	—
2019	Black & White (Acoustic – Greatest Hits)	Easy Star Records	—
2021	Live at Humphrey's	Easy Star Records	—
2023	Summertime EP	Ineffable Records	—
2023	Live at Blue Note Hawaii	The Green Records	—

=== Singles ===
Title	Release date	Album
"Love I"	2010	The Green
"Trod The Hard Road"	2010	The Green
"I'm Yours"	2010	The Green
"Alive"	2010	The Green
"What Will Be Will Be"	2010	The Green
"Wake Up"	2010	The Green
"Never"	2010	The Green
"Runaway Train"	2010	The Green
"How Does It Feel" (feat. Kimie)	2010	The Green
"Dearest Sylvia"	2010	The Green
Rootsie Roots""	2010	The Green
"Love & Affection"	2011	Love & Affection EP
"Travlah"	2011	Love & Affection EP
"Got Me In Love"	2011	Love & Affection EP
"Come In" (feat. Jacob Hemphill of SOJA)	2011	Ways & Means
"She Was The Best"	2011	Ways & Means
"Love Is Strong"	2011	Ways & Means
"Ways & Means"	2011	Ways & Means
"Gotta Be"	2011	Ways & Means
"Liar"	September 11, 2012	(Single)
"Love & Affection" (Billy Van Remix)	September 11, 2012	(Single)
"Something About It"	2013	Hawaiʻi 13
"Good One"	2013	Hawaiʻi 13
"Chocolates & Roses"	2013	Hawaiʻi 13
"Striking Up A Love"	2013	Hawaiʻi 13
"Power In Words"	2013	Hawaiʻi 13
"Take Me On"	2013	Hawaiʻi 13
"Always & Forever"	2013	Hawaiʻi 13
"Roots"	January 8, 2016	(Single)
"Promised Land"	2016	We Remember Dennis Brown (Single)
"Good Feeling" (feat. Eric Rachmany of Rebelution)	2017	Marching Orders
"Foolish Love"	2017	Marching Orders
"Marching Orders" (feat. Busy Signal)	2017	Marching Orders
"All I Need"	2017	Marching Orders
"Mama Roots" (feat. J Boog)	2017	Marching Orders
"Land of Love" (feat. The Manaʻo Company)	2017	Marching Orders
"Going Up"	2017	Marching Orders
"My Rights" (feat. Fiji)	2017	Marching Orders
"I Will"	2017	Marching Orders
"Maui Ninja"	2017	Marching Orders
"Alone" (Acoustic)	2019	Black & White
"Good Vibration" (Acoustic)	2019	Black & White
"Decisions" (Acoustic)	2019	Black & White
"Three Little Birds (ʻEkolu Manu Liʻiliʻi)"	May 24, 2019	Hawaiian Lullaby (Single)
"My Hawaiʻi" (feat. Sean Naʻauao, Kaumakaiwa & Kumu Hina)	December 20, 2019	(Single)
"Feelings" (feat. J Boog & Gyptian)	April 30, 2021	Brand New Eyes (Single)
"Recipe" (Aswad cover)	July 2, 2021	Brand New Eyes (Single)
"Coming Home"	September 3, 2021	Brand New Eyes (Single)
"Blue Skies" (feat. Keznamdi)	October 8, 2021	Brand New Eyes (Single)
"Coming Home" (Remix) (feat. Allen Stone)	November 1, 2022	(Single)
"Young Man" (feat. Common Kings)	January 6, 2023	(Single)
"Summertime"	June 25, 2023	Summertime EP
"Lover Tonight"	September 1, 2023	Summertime EP
"Step Out"	September 1, 2023	Summertime EP
