= Get Wiser Live DVD =

Get Wiser Live

Video by SOJA
- Released: November 21, 2007
- Recorded: January 6, 2006
- Genre: Reggae
- Length: 1:30:46
- Label: Innerloop
- Producer: Jim Fox, Dick Bangham, SOJA

SOJA chronology
Get Wiser (2006)	Get Wiser Live (2007)	Stars & Stripes EP (2008)

Get Wiser Live is a DVD recorded on January 6, 2006 by reggae band SOJA at the State Theatre in Falls Church, Virginia. The show consisted of two separate sets, with the opening set being older songs, and the second set being Get Wiser in its entirety.

Professional ratings
Review scores
Source	Rating
Washington Post	

== Track listing ==
1. "Sabrina"
2. "Vespa Mania"
3. "Kebersamaan"
4. "Rastaman Rastawati"
5. "Anak Pantai"

== Personnel ==
=== Guests ===
Guests on the DVD include those featured on the studio album. From Gomba Jahbari:

- Carmelo Romero - vocals
- Misael Clemente - saxophone, flute
- Jahaziel Garcia - trumpet

From Rare Essence:

- Milton "Go Go Mickey" Freeman - congas

From the Eddie Drennon String Quartet:

- Eddie Drennon - violin 1
- Lerna May-Frandsen - violin 2
- Julius Wirth - viola
- Henry Mays - cello

=== Video crew ===
Camera Crews: Rip Bang Pictures

- Tommy Braswell, Director of Photography
- Dick Bangham
- Divine Kemayu
- Ralston Smith
- Smiley Moys
- Sam Steward

Hendy Street Produxions

- Tony Morin
- Brian Terlep
- Chris Burns
- Charity Ruiter

=== Audio crew ===
Live Recording: Big Mo Recording Services

- Greg Hartman
- Chris Weal
- Mike Caplan

Lion & Fox Recording Studios

- Mixed & mastered by Jim Fox

=== State theatre crew ===
- Derrick Parker
- Chris Gulino
- Dempsey Hamilton
- Tim Pace
