= Born in Babylon =

Studio album by Soldiers of Jah Army
- Released: August 25, 2009
- Genre: Reggae
- Label: DMV Records

Soldiers of Jah Army chronology
Get Wiser (2006)	Born in Babylon (2009)	Strength to Survive (2012)

Born in Babylon is the third full-length studio album by reggae band SOJA. It was released August 25, 2009 exclusively on iTunes, through DMV Records. Physical copies can also be bought at concerts where the band uses a "Pay What You Want" pricing model. A review in Exclaim! magazine stated the album saw SOJA "stretching their boundaries and enjoying the legroom".

== Track listing ==
All tracks by Jacob Hemphill except where noted.

1. "Born in Babylon" – 4:36.
2. "Losing My Mind" – 5:36.
3. "Used to Matter" – 4:19.
4. "Bleed Through" (ft. Black Boo of Mambo Sauce) (Alfred Duncan, Hemphill) – 6:30.
5. "You and Me" (ft. Chris Boomer) – 5:10.
6. "Don't Forget" – 3:00.
7. "Decide You're Gone" – 4:32.
8. "I Don't Wanna Wait " – 5:57.
9. "I Tried" (ft. Gentleman and Tamika) (Gentleman, Hemphill) – 4:54.
10. "Never Ever" – 3:34.
11. "Summer Breeze" (Hemphill, Bobby Lee) – 5.09.
12. "Waking Up" – 6.08
13. "Thunderstorms" – 7:01
14. "Here I Am" (ft. Marley, Rory, and Eric of Rebelution) – 4:48
15. "Rest of My Life (Bonus track)" - 5:16.

== Personnel ==
- Bobby “Bumblebee” Lee - Bass
- Eddie Drennon – violin
- Michael McCormick – piano
- Patrick O'Shea – organ, keyboards
- Christopher Wight – keyboards
- Julius Wirth – viola
- Ryan “Bird” Berty - Drums
