= In the Moment (Rebelution album) =

Studio album by Rebelution
- Released: June 18, 2021
- Genre: Reggae rock
- Length: 52:28
- Label: Easy Star Records

Rebelution chronology
Free Rein (2018)	In the Moment (2021)	Reflections (2023)

In the Moment is the seventh studio album by American reggae band Rebelution. It was released on June 18, 2021.

== Background ==
Recorded remotely during the COVID-19 pandemic, the album has been described by the band as "a work of profound reflection, a probing, revelatory meditation that balances joy and introspection in equal measure as the band contemplates the meaning of time and how to spend what precious little we have." It spawned four singles: "Satisfied", "Old School Feeling", "Heavy as Lead", and "All or Nothing". The band went on tour in 2021 after the album was released.

== Reception ==
In the Moment was praised for the band creatively expressed who they are, what preoccupies them, and where they are headed. Online magazine Surf Roots nominated it for the 2021 Album of the Year.

== Track listing ==
All tracks are written by Rebelution.

No.	Title	Length
1.	"Satisfied"	3:16
2.	"Old School Feeling"	3:56
3.	"Heavy as Lead"	2:56
4.	"To Be Younger"	2:59
5.	"Initials"	3:14
6.	"2020 Vision" (featuring Kabaka Pyramid)	3:23
7.	"All or Nothing" (featuring Busy Signal)	3:30
8.	"You and I"	3:04
9.	"Adapt, Survive"	4:03
10.	"Future Depends"	3:26
11.	"That Zone" (featuring Durand Jones)	4:02
12.	"Simply Captivating" (featuring Keznamdi)	3:36
13.	"Places Unknown"	3:30
14.	"What Life Is"	4:27
15.	"To Be Younger" (acoustic)	3:00
Total length:		52:28

== Personnel ==
- Eric Rachmany – vocals, guitar
- Kyle Ahern – rhythm guitar
- Rory Carey – keyboards
- Marley D. Williams – bass
- Wesley Finley – drums
