= SOI =

SOI or soi or variation may refer to:

== Technology ==
- Silicon on insulator, in semiconductor manufacturing
- Signal operating instructions
- Service-oriented infrastructure
- Stages of involvement for safety-critical software and hardware, US FAA

== Science ==
- Southern Oscillation Index
- Sphere of influence (astrodynamics)
- Second-order intercept point, a measure of linearity that quantifies second-order distortion generated by nonlinear systems and devices
- Styrene-oxide isomerase, an enzyme that catalyzes a chemical reaction

== Soi ==
- A soi is a side-street branching off a major street in Thailand.
- Soi (surname), a surname
- Soi language, an Iranian language
- Chua Soi Lek (born 1947), Malaysian politician

== Other uses ==
- Sociosexual Orientation Inventory
- School of Infantry
- Severity of illness
- Solomon Islands, UNDP country code
- Sphere of influence, in politics
- Symphony Orchestra of India
- Stars on Ice, a skating tour
- Statistics of Income of the US Internal Revenue Service
- Shadow of Israphel, a Minecraft series by The Yogscast
- Soi, an error in the Microsoft Sam text to speech voice when saying "soy" or "soi".

== See also ==
- Pou-Soi
- Soy (disambiguation)
- SOJ (disambiguation)
- Soja (disambiguation)
- Soya (disambiguation)
- Soia (disambiguation)
