= Nahko and Medicine for the People =

American world music group

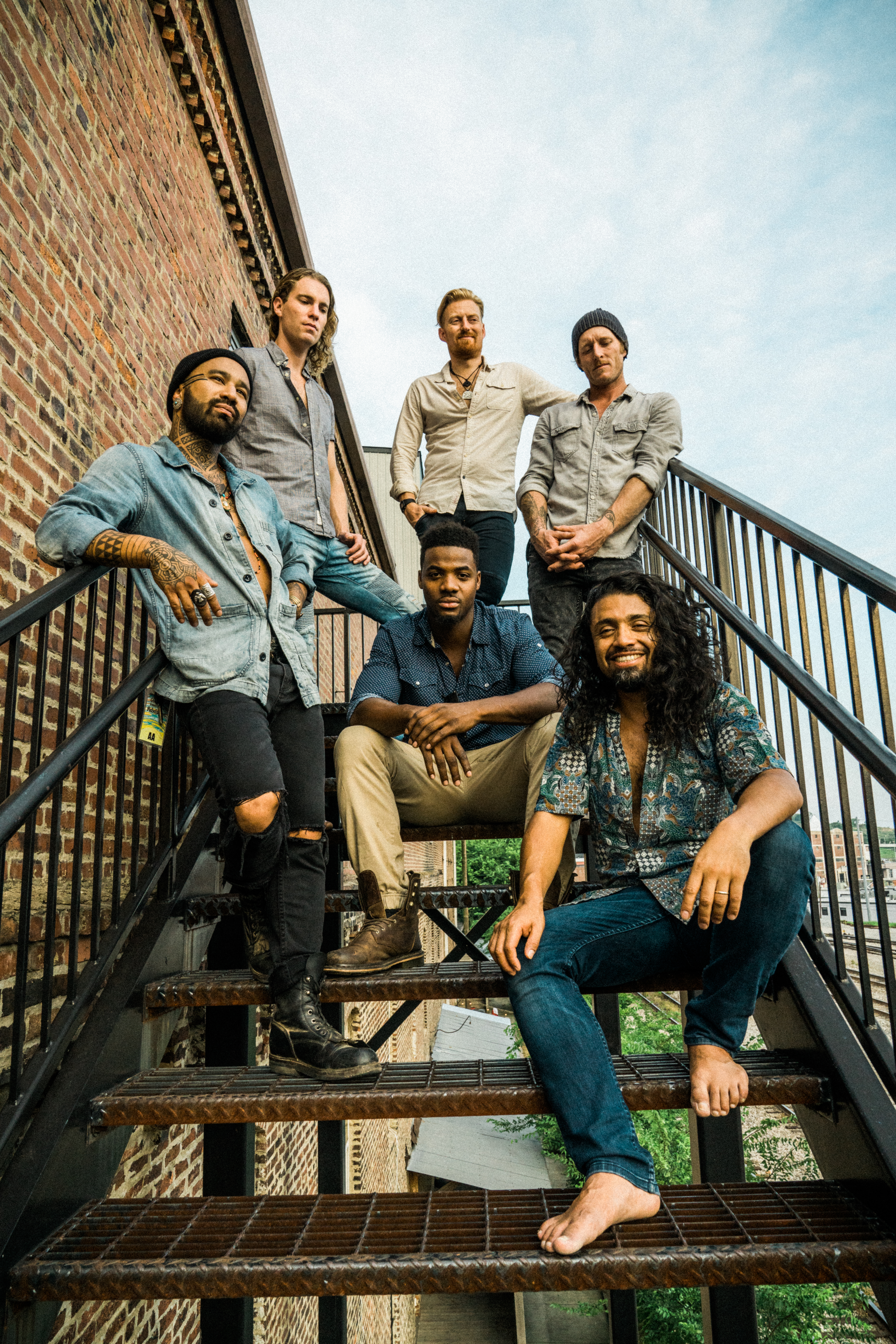
- Nahko and Medicine for the People in 2017

Background information
- Origin: United States
- Genres: Worldbeat; world music
- Years active: 2008–present
- Labels: Medicine Tribe Records, Side One Dummy Records
- Members: Nahko Bear; Justin Chittams; Joe Hall; Patricio Zuñiga Labarca; Max Ribner; Tim Snider; TJ Schaper
- Past members: Don Corey; Hope Medford; Chase Makai
- Website: nahko.com

Nahko and Medicine for the People is an American world music group headed by Nahko Bear. They have released nine studio albums.

== Background ==
Nahko Bear was born in Portland, Oregon. Nahko is short for Nahkohe-ese, "little bear" in the Cheyenne language. He is of Native American, Puerto Rican, and Filipino descent. According to Indianz.com, he has not specified which Apache or Mohawk tribes he descends from. Adopted by a white middle-class Christian family, he learned of his heritage after reconnecting with his biological mother as an adult. His birth was the result of rape, and his biological father had been murdered. He learned to play the piano at the age of six and the guitar at fourteen. He began his musical career by busking and formed the band in 2008. Nahko and Medicine for the People play a fusion of styles often called world music, or worldbeat. The group's lyrics present a message of social and environmental consciousness.

== Tours and festivals ==
Nahko and Medicine for the People have toured with Nattali Rize, Rebelution, Michael Franti, Trevor Hall, Dispatch, Xavier Rudd, and SOJA. The band largely appears at alternative music festivals, including the Greenbelt Festival, the ARISE Music Festival, and Tour de Fat.

== Solo work ==
In 2017, Bear released a solo album titled My Name Is Bear, under the name Nahko.

== Controversy ==
On July 8, 2020, following accusations from multiple individuals of sexually inappropriate behavior, Bear resigned from the board of Honor the Earth. In their statement, "Regarding Nahko", the board stated that they have "a zero-tolerance policy for sexual harassment and inappropriate sexual behavior".

After the initial surge of public interest, Bear responded to the accusations made against him. On August 10, 2020, he shared a statement on the band's Facebook page, in which he expressed regret to the women he had harmed through his inappropriate actions and disputed allegations against him as false.

== Band members ==
Current

- Nahko Bear – vocals
- Justin Chittams – drums
- Joe Hall – lead guitar
- Patricio Zuñiga Labarca – bass guitar
- Max Ribner – trumpet
- Tim Snider – electric violin
- TJ Schaper – trombone

Past

- Hope Medford – hand percussion and rhythm
- Don Corey – bass (On Dark as Night)
- Chase Makai – lead guitar

== Discography ==
=== Nahko and Medicine for the People ===
Studio albums

- On the Verge (2012)
- Dark as Night (2013)
- HOKA (2016)
- Take Your Power Back (2020)
- Take Your Power Back (Acoustic) (EP, 2021)
- beautiful trouble (2021)
- TRENCHES (2023)
- On the Verge – 10 Year Anniversary Edition (2024)
- Dark as Night – Acoustic Edition (2024)

Live albums

- Live at Sugarshack Sessions (2024)

Singles

Title	Year	Peak chart positions	Album
Title	Year	US AAA	Album
"Wash It Away"	2014	—	Non-album single
"Lifeguard"	2019	36	Take Your Power Back
"Slow Down"	2019	—	Take Your Power Back
"Garden"	2020	—	Take Your Power Back
"Honor the Earth"	2020	—	Take Your Power Back
"DICHOTOMY (Acoustic)"	2023	—	Non-album single
"TRENCHES (Acoustic)"	2023	—	Non-album single
"Wash It Away – 10 Year Anniversary Edition"	2024	—	Non-album single
"Black as Night – Raw Ordio Remix"	2025	—	Non-album single
"—" denotes single did not chart or was not released in that territory

=== Nahko ===
- My Name Is Bear (2017)
