= Rebelution (band) =

American reggae rock band

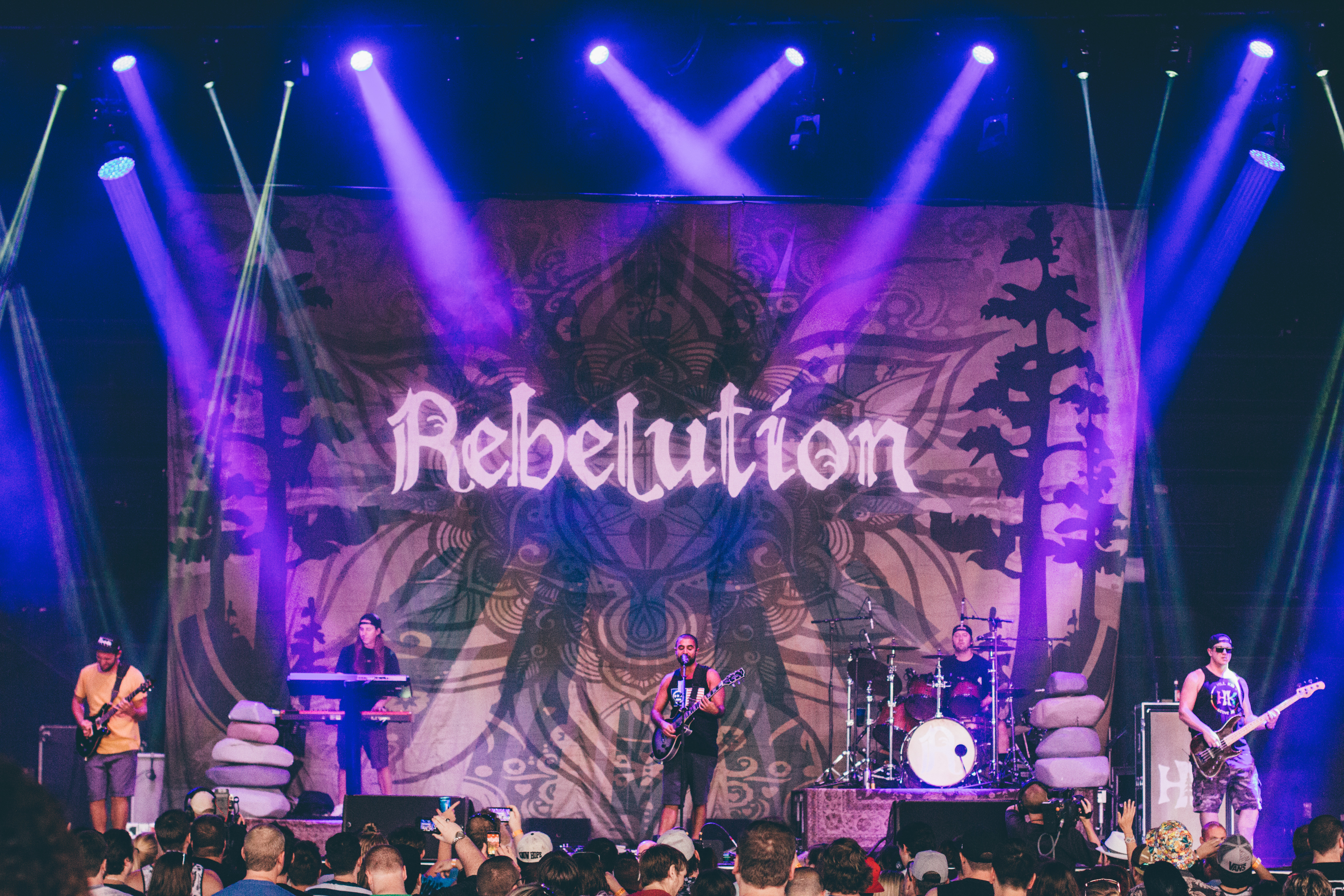
- Rebelution performing live at Cali Roots in 2014

Background information
- Origin: Isla Vista, California, United States
- Genres: Reggae rock, roots reggae, dub
- Years active: 2004–present
- Labels: 87 Music; Hill Kid; Raise Up Music; Red Distribution; Easy Star Records
- Members: Eric Rachmany; Rory Carey; Marley D. Williams; Wesley Finley
- Past members: Matt Velasquez
- Website: www.rebelutionmusic.com

Rebelution is an American reggae rock band formed in Isla Vista, California. The current members of Rebelution are Eric Rachmany, Rory Carey, Marley D. Williams, and Wesley Finley. Each member attended and completed school at the University of California, Santa Barbara.

== History ==
=== Formation and Courage to Grow (2004–2007) ===
Rebelution was formed in the college town of Isla Vista, California, in 2004. The five original band members were Eric Rachmany, Matt Velasquez, Rory Carey, Marley D. Williams, and Wesley Finley, who were all University of California, Santa Barbara students.

Throughout 2004–2005, Rebelution began to build momentum through consistently playing local shows and by independently releasing an EP. All four current members graduated from UC Santa Barbara, getting degrees in religious studies (Rachmany), anthropology (Finley), film studies (Williams), and business economics (Carey).

Rebelution released their first full-length album Courage to Grow on June 8, 2007, which would become the breakthrough album for the band. The album was praised for its crafty melodies, socially conscious lyrics, and savvy musicianship. Courage to Grow went on to garner mass downloads and radio play on stations such as San Francisco's Live 105, where their single "Safe and Sound" was played on heavy rotation, with spins on San Diego's 91X and Los Angeles's KROQ. The album was selected as iTunes Editor's Choice for Best Reggae Album of 2007. In addition, Courage to Grow peaked at #4 on the Billboard Top Reggae Albums chart. However, Velasquez, one of the two vocalists, left after the release of Courage to Grow due to him growing tired from the rigorous touring lifestyle. This left Rebelution as a four-member band.

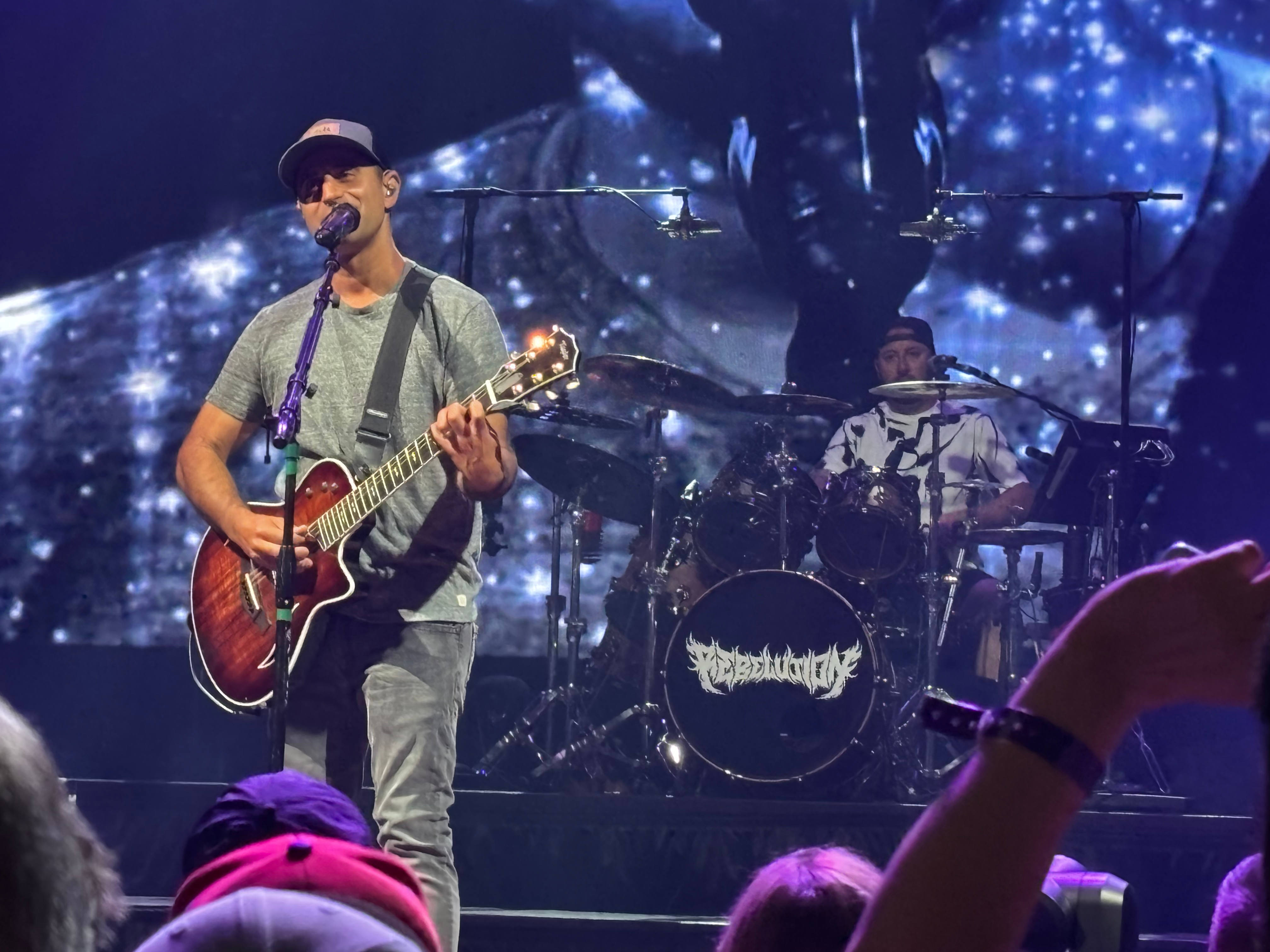
Rebelution perform at Ovation Hall in 2024.

=== Bright Side of Life (2008–2010) ===
Two years after their first album, Rebelution released their second full-length album, Bright Side of Life on August 4, 2009. Bright Side of Life was officially released and dominated the iTunes charts, reaching the #1 spot on iTunes in the Reggae music genre, and the #3 spot for Top Albums Downloaded in the United States in all genres of music. The album also reached #1 on the Billboard Top Reggae Albums chart and #54 on Billboard's Top 200.

The release of Bright Side of Life marks the first release under Rebelution's newly founded record label "87 Music" (named after their address while attending college at UCSB: 6587 Del Playa Drive.

The band played at the 2009 Harmony Festival, and also at the Rothbury Music Festival in the Summer of 2009.

Rebelution performed at the 2010 Harmony Festival in Santa Rosa, California along with other well-known acts such as The Expendables, Slightly Stoopid and Lauryn Hill. They also performed at All Good Music Festival, Bonnaroo, Lollapalooza, Austin City Limits and Wakarusa music festivals in 2010.

=== Peace of Mind (2011–2013) ===
On January 10, 2012, Rebelution released their third studio album, Peace Of Mind, through their own label 87 Music. Peace of Mind: Acoustic features all twelve original album tracks in a stripped-down acoustic style; similarly, Peace of Mind: Dub, which was remixed by Easy Star's Michael Goldwasser, was also released. The album debuted at #13 on the Billboard 200 charts and #1 for both Independent and Reggae Albums; it was also the #4 iTunes album overall, selling 16,000 copies its first week, despite giving away half the album for free to their fans over the six weeks prior to release.

=== Count Me In (2014–2015) ===
In May 2014, Rebelution performed as a headlining act at the California Roots Music and Arts Festival in Monterey, California.

The band partnered with Easy Star Records to release their fourth album, Count Me In, on June 10, 2014, which featured contributions from Don Carlos and Collie Buddz. It debuted as the #14 album on the Billboard 200 albums chart and the #1 Billboard Reggae album. Following the album's release, Rebelution went on the Count Me In tour with supporting acts Iration, The Green, and Stick Figure.

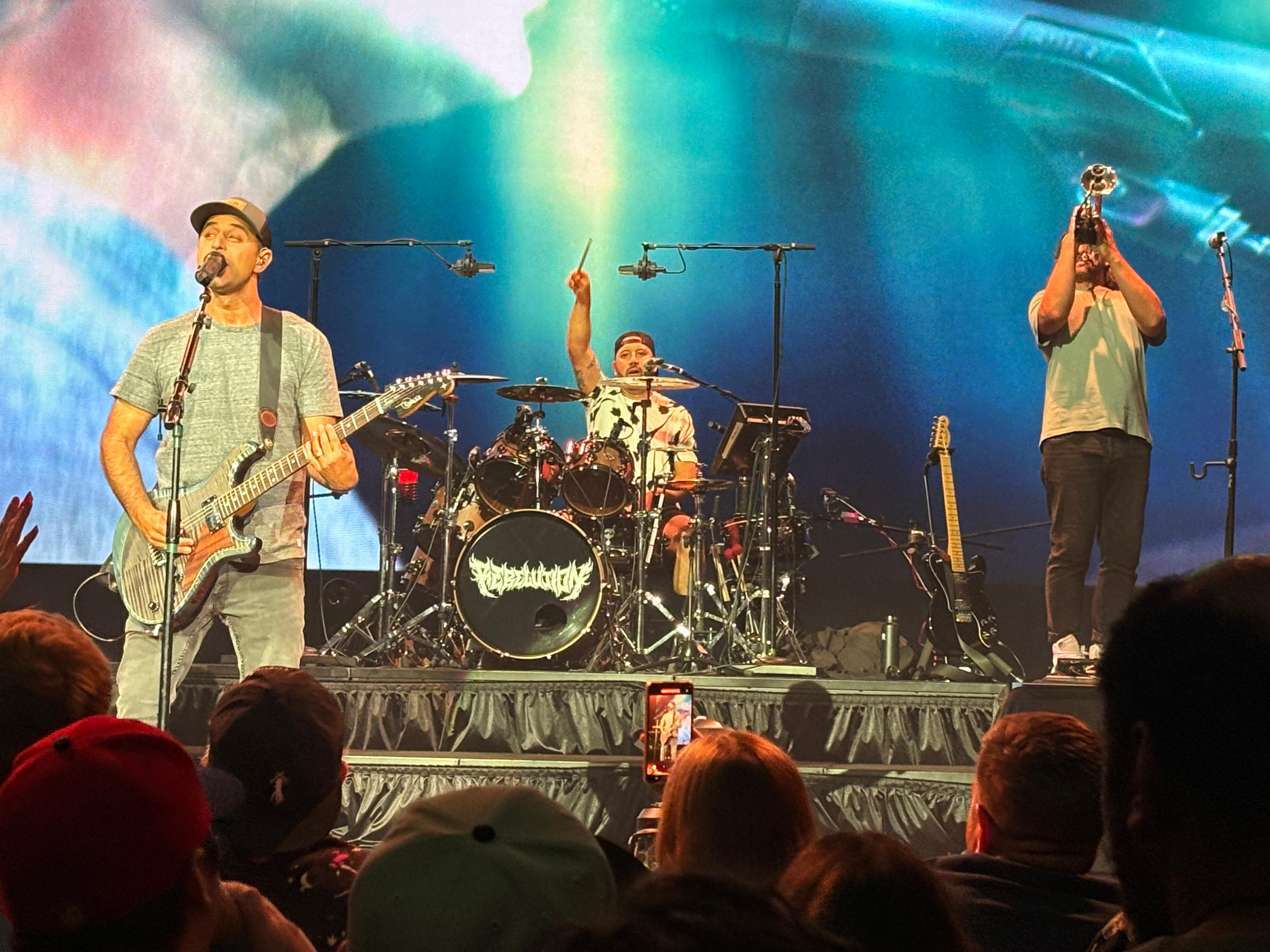
Rebelution perform at Ovation Hall in Atlantic City, NJ on June 1, 2024.

In September 2014, the band performed as a headlining act at the Carolina Sessions Festival and the Tampa, Florida debut of the Reggae Rise Up Festival.

In December 2014, Count Me In was named as the best-selling reggae album of the year by Billboard. An acoustic version of the album was released in 2015 and again topped the Billboard Reggae chart.

=== Falling Into Place (2016–2017) ===
On June 3, 2016, the band released their fifth studio album, Falling Into Place, as a joint venture with Easy Star Records. The album debuted at #1 on the Billboard Reggae chart, and remained on the chart for more than 60 weeks. It also was #32 on Billboard's Top 200.

=== Free Rein (2018–2019) ===
On June 15, 2018, the band released their sixth studio album, Free Rein, which included collaborations with acclaimed Jamaican producers Don Corleon and Winta James. Free Rein, and their 2019 Vinyl Box Set both reached #1 on the Billboard Top Reggae Albums chart. Free Rein also made it to #41 on Billboard's Top 200 chart.

=== The Dub Collection (2020) ===
Instead of creating a dub version of Free Rein, Rachmany wanted to reward fans by releasing a whole new dub album. On July 17, 2020, Rebelution released The Dub Collection, which was mixed by the band's current lead touring guitarist, Kyle Ahern, who previously won their "Jam With The Band" contest. The album features dub music versions of Rebelution's early material. It includes three "fan-favorite" songs from each of their studio albums. The album reached #8 on the Billboard Top Reggae Album charts.

=== In The Moment (2021–present) ===
Rebelution released their seventh studio album, In The Moment, on June 18, 2021 through 87 Music and Easy Star Records. The album includes 15 tracks (with an acoustic version of one of their songs, "To Be Younger"). It features guest appearances by Jamaican reggae artists Keznamdi, Kabaka Pyramid, and Busy Signal, American soul singer Durand Jones, and The Indications. The album was produced and coordinated by their own touring guitarist, Kyle Ahern. In The Moment debuted at #2 on Billboard's Reggae Albums chart and #36 on their Independent Albums chart. It also debuted at #22 on Billboard's Current Albums Sales chart, and #35 on their Top Album Sales chart.

On May 20, 2022, Rebelution released their second live album, titled Live in St. Augustine, which was recorded during a sold-out 2021 live performance of their 23-song set at the St. Augustine Amphitheatre in St. Augustine, Florida.

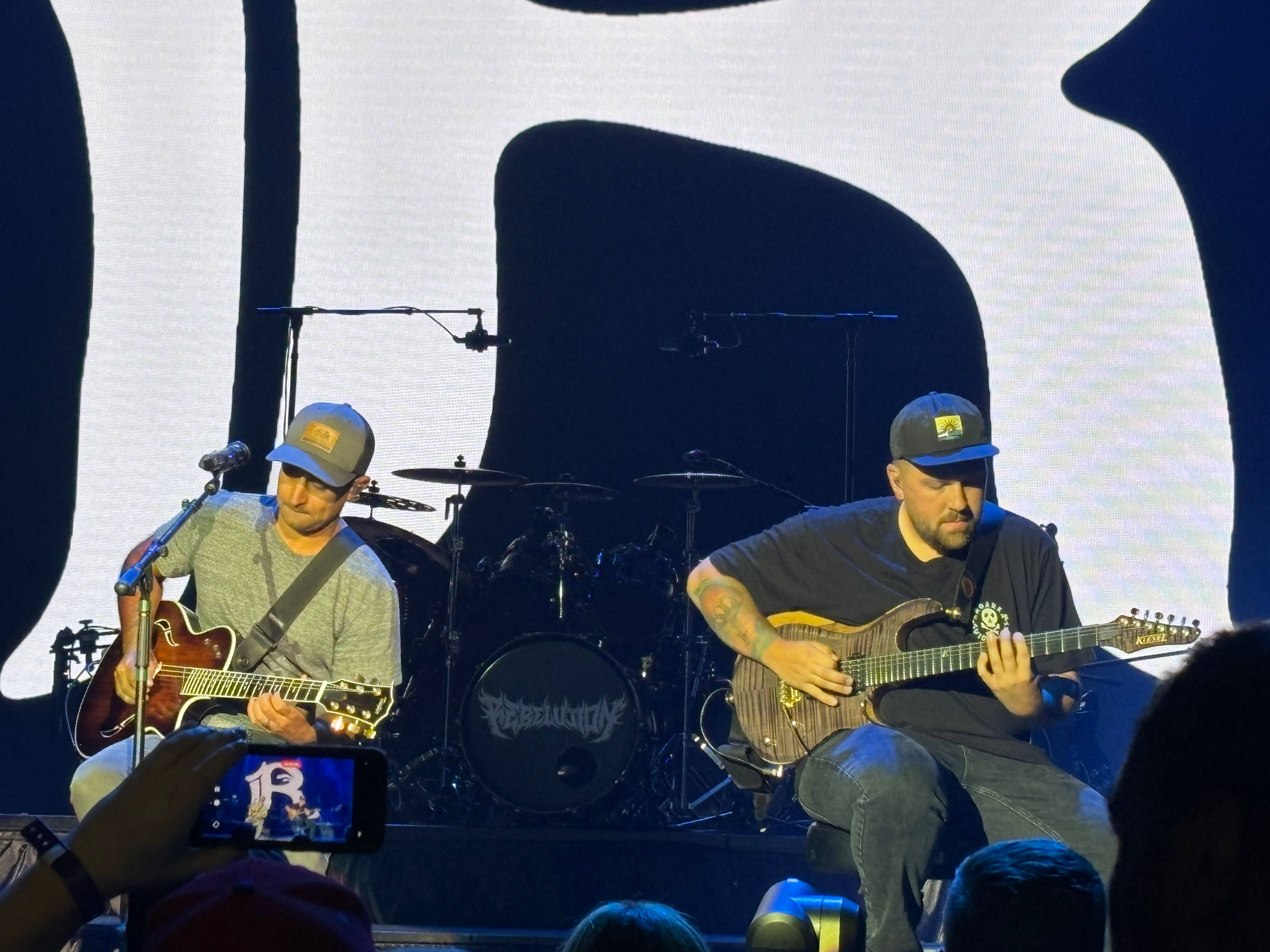
Eric Rachmany and Kyle Ahern perform Honeypot as part of a Rebelution show at Ovation Hall in Atlantic City, NJ on June 1, 2024.

On May 12, 2023, Rebelution digitally released their third acoustic album, Reflections, which they made available on all streaming platforms. It features 10 acoustic tracks and video sessions that were filmed and recorded at Santa Barbara Sound Design and mixed by Kyle Ahern.

== Other projects ==
Rebelution worked with Florida-based breweries Rock Brothers Brewing and Cigar City Brewing to create Rebelution IPA in Summer 2016.

Eric Rachmany started a side project with DJ AmpLive called Unified Highway in 2014.

In 2018, the band partnered with Lost Abby & The Hop Concept to create "Take On Anything" IPA, which is available in stores across California and online.

In addition, Rebelution teamed up with FlavRx to release all-natural cannabis oil cartridges in two strains—Sour Tsunami Sativa and Cali-O Indica—as well as a customized oil battery pen and herb vaporizer. These products are available in select dispensaries in California that carry FlavRx products, with distribution growing to other legal states shortly. The band will be donating a portion of all proceeds towards Cannabis-related medical research and legalization organizations.

== Awards and honors ==
After its debut album was one of the most downloaded reggae albums on iTunes, Rebelution's Courage to Grow was named the iTunes Editors Choice: Best Reggae Album 2007.

Rebelution received their first Grammy nomination in 2017 when their album Falling Into Place was nominated for the "Best Reggae Album" award.

In December 2021, Rebelution was nominated for the fans-choice "2021 Album of the Year" award by Surf Roots TV & Radio for their album In The Moment. Voting was determined by Facebook, Instagram, and Twitter users. This was the band's first time being nominated by the reggae rock streaming TV channel on Amazon Fire TV, Apple TV, and Roku.

== Lineup ==
Current members

- Eric Rachmany – Vocals, Guitar, Songwriter (2004–present)
- Rory Carey – Keyboards (2004–present)
- Marley D. Williams – Bass (2004–present)
- Wesley Finley – Drums (2004–present)

Touring members

- Zach Meyerowitz – Trumpet (2014–present)
- Kyle Ahern – Guitar (2016–present)
- Eric Hirschhorn – Saxophone (2018–present)

Former members

- Matt Velasquez – Vocals, Guitar, Songwriter (2004–2007)

Former touring members

- Khris Royal – Saxophone (2011–2014)
- Mike Eyia – Saxophone (2014–2018) *died in February 2018.

== Discography ==
=== Studio albums ===
Title	Album details	Peak chart positions			Sales
Title	Album details	US	US Reggae	US Indie	Sales
Courage to Grow	Release date: June 8, 2007; Label: Self-release; Formats: CD, Digital	—	4	—	
Bright Side of Life	Release date: August 4, 2009; Label: Controlled Substance Sound Labs; Formats: CD, LP, Digital	54	1	—	
Peace of Mind	Release date: January 10, 2012; Label: 87 Music/Red Distribution; Formats: CD, LP, Digital	13	1	1	US: 16,000 copies (first week)
Count Me In	Release date: June 10, 2014; Label: Controlled Substance Sound Labs; Formats: CD, LP, Digital	14	1	—	US: 17,201 copies (first week)
Falling Into Place	Release date: June 3, 2016; Label: Easy Star Records; Formats: CD, Digital	32	1	—	US: 13,000+ copies (first week); US: 43,000 copies total
Free Rein	Release date: June 15, 2018; Label: Easy Star Records; Formats: CD, LP, Digital	41	1	—	US: 18,000 copies (first week)
In The Moment	Release date: June 18, 2021; Label: Easy Star Records; Formats: CD, LP, Digital	—	2	—	US: 3,452 copies (first week); US: 6,038 (digital/streaming)
"—" denotes releases that did not chart

=== EPs/Live albums ===
Rebelution Chart History
Year	Album	Label	Billboard peak
2006	Rebelution (EP)	Self-produced	—
2011	Remix EP	87 Music/Controlled Substance Sound Labs	#2
2015	Count Me In Remix EP	Controlled Substance Sound Labs	#1
2016	Live at Red Rocks	Easy Star Records	#1
2022	Live in St. Augustine	Round Hill Records	TBD

=== Dub albums ===
Rebelution Chart History
Year	Album	Label	Billboard peak
2012	Peace of Mind – Dub	87 Music	—
2020	The Dub Collection	Easy Star Records	#8

=== Acoustic albums ===
Rebelution Chart History
Year	Album	Label	Billboard peak
2012	Peace of Mind – Acoustic	87 Music	—
2015	Count Me In – Acoustic	Controlled Substance Sound Labs	#1
2023	Reflections	87 Music	—

=== Singles ===
Title	Release date	Album	Certifications
"Safe and Sound"	2007	Courage to Grow	
"Feeling Alright"	2007	Courage to Grow	
"Attention Span"	2007	Courage to Grow	
"Heart Like a Lion"	2007	Courage to Grow	
"Green to Black"	2007	Courage to Grow	
"Ordinary Girl"	2007	Courage to Grow	
"R Way"	2007	Courage to Grow	
"Running"	2007	Courage to Grow	
"Night Crawler"	2007	Courage to Grow	
"Bright Side of Life"	2009	Bright Side of Life	
"Bump"	2009	Bright Side of Life	
"Lazy Afternoon"	2009	Bright Side of Life	RIAA: Gold
"More Than Ever"	2009	Bright Side of Life	
"Suffering"	2009	Bright Side of Life	
"Too Rude"	2009	Bright Side of Life	
"So High" (feat. Zumbi of Zion I)	2012	Peace of Mind	
"Sky is the Limit"	2012	Peace of Mind	
"Closer I Get" (feat. John Popper)	2012	Peace of Mind	
"Route Around"	2012	Peace of Mind	
"Meant to Be" (feat. Jacob Hemphill of SOJA)	2012	Peace of Mind	
"Good Vibes" (feat. Lutan Fyah)	2012	Peace of Mind	
"Life on the Line"	2012	Peace of Mind	
"Roots Reggae Music" (feat. Don Carlos)	2014	Count Me In	
"Fade Away"	2014	Count Me In	RIAA: Gold
"Hate To Be The One" (feat. Collie Buddz)	2014	Count Me In	
"De-stress"	2014	Count Me In	
"Count Me In"	2014	Count Me In	RIAA: Gold
"Pretty Lady"	2016	Falling Into Place	
"Inhale Exhale" (feat. Protoje)	2016	Falling Into Place	
"Lay My Claim"	2016	Falling Into Place	
"Those Days"	2016	Falling Into Place	
"Celebrate"	2018	Free Rein	
"City Life"	2018	Free Rein	
"Healing"	2018	Free Rein	
"Legend"	2018	Free Rein	
"Patience"	2018	Free Rein	
"Legend Dub"	2020	The Dub Collection	
"Moonlight Dub"	2020	The Dub Collection	
"City Life Dub"	2020	The Dub Collection	
"Suffering Dub"	2020	The Dub Collection	
"Satisfied"	March 26, 2021	In The Moment (Single)	
"Old School Feeling"	April 23, 2021	In The Moment (Single)	
"Heavy As Lead"	May 21, 2021	In The Moment (Single)	
"All Or Nothing" (feat. Busy Signal)	June 18, 2021	In The Moment (Single)	
"2020 Vision" (feat. Kabaka Pyramid)	2021	In The Moment	
"Places Unknown" (feat. Keznamdi)	2021	In The Moment	
"That Zone" (feat. Duran Jones)	2021	In The Moment	
"Old School Feeling" (Remix) (feat. Steel Pulse, Tarrus Riley & Peetah Morgan)	March 10, 2023	(Single)	

=== Compilations ===
- Rebelution Vinyl Box Set (2019)

== Collaborations ==
Rebelution (Eric Rachmany) has collaborated or was featured on songs with artists and bands throughout the years.

- Zion I – "Many Stylez" (2010)
- I Wayne – "So High" (2011)
- Tribal Seeds – "Soundwaves" (2011)
- Thrive – "Just Fine" (2013)
- Amp Live – "Signs" (2014)
- MAAD T-RAY – "Don't Stress No One" (2015)
- Stick Figure – "Mind Block" (2015)
- Through The Roots – "Bear With Me" (2015)
- Morgan Heritage – "Wanna Be Loved" (2016)
- The Expendables – "Stay Now" (2017)
- HIRIE – "Sun and Shine" (2017)
- The Green – "Good Feeling" (2017)
- Ballyhoo! – "Let Her Go" (feat. Reel Big Fish) (2018)
  - "This Chick Is Wack" (2020)
- Kyle Ahern – "Good Will Come" (2018)
- Arise Roots – "Come And Get It" (feat. Slightly Stoopid) (2019)
- Iration – "Right Here Right Now" (feat. Stick Figure) (2020)
- Sun Dried Vibes – "Smoke Session" (feat. Jeremy Anderson of Treehouse!) (2020)
- SOJA – "The Day You Came" (feat. Ali Campbell of UB40) (2021)
