= Courage to Grow =

Studio album by Rebelution
- Released: June 8, 2007
- Recorded: Prairie Sun Studios
- Genre: Reggae; Ska Punk
- Length: 1:00:30
- Label: Independent
- Producer: Rebelution and Jim Fox

Rebelution chronology
Courage to Grow (2007)	Bright Side of Life (2009)

Courage to Grow is the debut album by Rebelution, a reggae band from Santa Barbara, CA. It was released on June 8, 2007, and reached the number 4 position in the Billboard Reggae Album chart.

== Track listing ==
No.	Title	Length
1.	"Courage To Grow"	4:16
2.	"Heart Like A Lion"	5:41
3.	"Safe And Sound"	3:48
4.	"Feeling Alright"	4:24
5.	"Ordinary Girl"	3:50
6.	"R Way"	6:58
7.	"Attention Span"	5:24
8.	"Green To Black"	4:22
9.	"On My Mind"	3:38
10.	"Running"	5:43
11.	"NightCrawler"	4:48
12.	"Other Side"	3:47
13.	"Safe And Sound Dub"	3:52

== Credits ==
Performers

- Matt Velasquez – Vocals/Guitar
- Eric Rachmany – Vocals/Guitar
- Marley D. Williams – Bass
- Wesley Finley – Drums
- Rory Carey – Keyboards

Guest Performers

- Kenny Bongos of SOJA – Percussion
- Kelsey Howard – Trombone
- Jim Passell – Trumpet
- Gene Cornelius – Cello/Shakuhachi
