= Styrene monooxygenase =

Enzyme

Identifiers
- EC no.: 1.14.14.11

Databases
- IntEnz: IntEnz view
- BRENDA: BRENDA entry
- ExPASy: NiceZyme view
- KEGG: KEGG entry
- MetaCyc: metabolic pathway
- PRIAM: profile
- PDB structures: RCSB PDB PDBe PDBsum
Search
- PMC: articles
- PubMed: articles
- NCBI: proteins

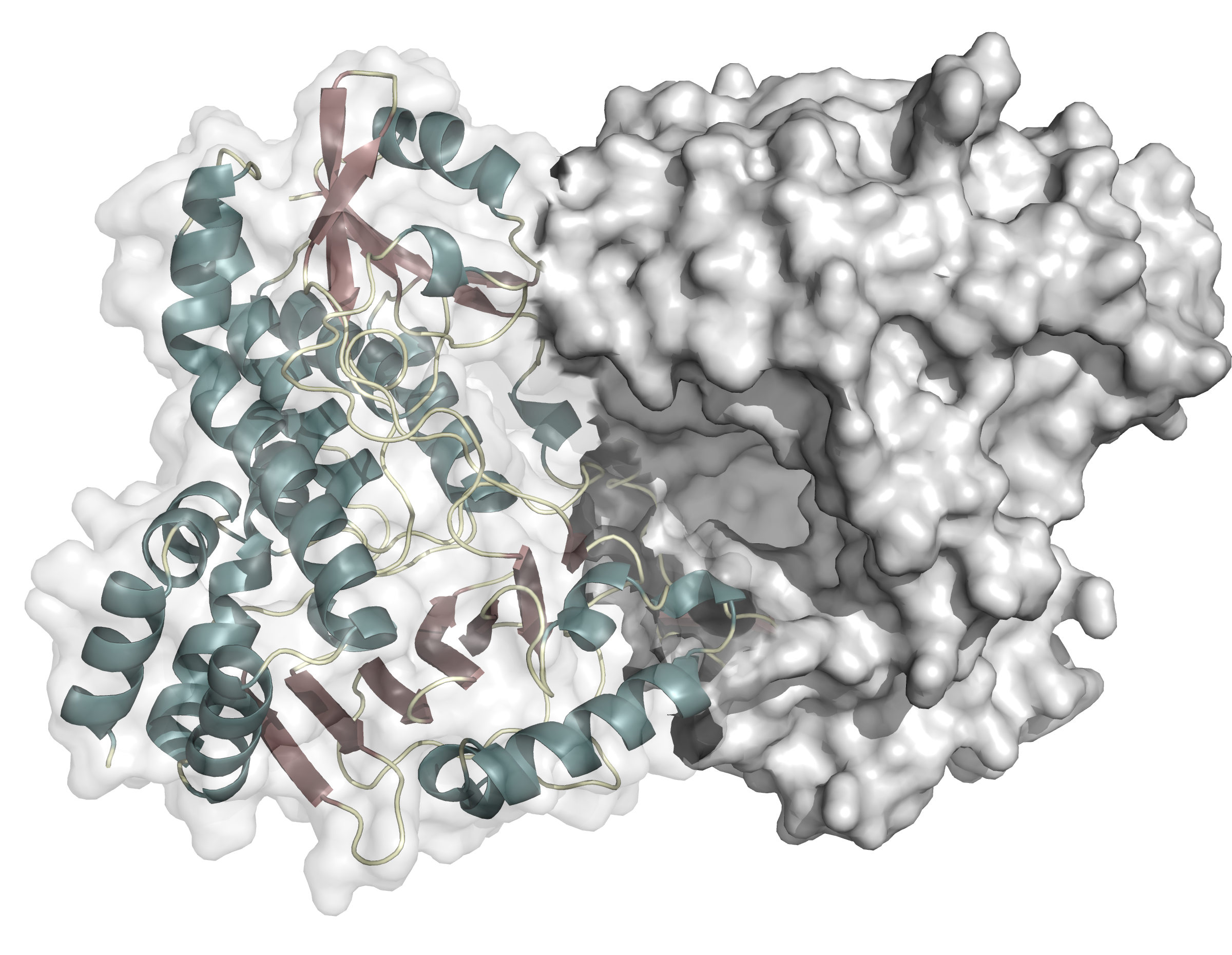
3D structure of styrene monooxygenase (3IHM).

A styrene monooxygenase (SMO; EC 1.14.14.11) is an enzyme that catalyzes the chemical reaction

styrene
+ FADH_{2}
O_{2}
H_{2}O
(S)-styrene oxide
+ FAD

as the first step of the aerobic styrene degradation pathway. The product is the (S) enantiomer of styrene oxide and can be converted by a styrene-oxide isomerase to obtain phenylacetaldehyde, which can be transformed into phenylacetic acid by phenylacetaldehyde dehydrogenase.

The enzyme belongs to the group of oxidoreductases according to the EC classification and is dependent on flavin adenine dinucleotide (FAD) as cofactor, thus it was classified as an external flavoprotein monooxygenase (designated as type E). It forms a two-component system with a reductase (StyB, StyA2B). The reductase utilizes solely nicotinamide adenine dinucleotide to reduce the FAD, which is then transferred to the styrene monooxygenase (StyA, StyA1). Two types of that enzyme are described so far: StyA/StyB (designated E1), first described from Pseudomonas species, and StyA1/StyA2B (designated E2), first described from Actinobacteria. The E1-type is more abundant in nature and comprises a single monooxygenase (StyA) supported by a single reductase (StyB), whereas the E2-type has a major monooxygenase (StyA1) which is supported by fusion protein of a monooxygenase and reductase (StyA2B). The latter one is the source of reduced FAD for the monooxygenase subunits and has some side activity as a monooxygenase. So far all styrene monooxygenases perform enantioselective epoxidations of styrene and chemically analogous compounds, which makes them interesting for biotechnological applications.

In 2021, styrene monooxygenases with (R)-selectivity were described for the first time.
