= Soya =

Soya may refer to:

== Food ==
- Soya bean, or soybean, a species of legume native to East Asia, widely grown for its edible bean
- Soya sauce, see soy sauce, a fermented sauce made from soybeans, roasted grain, water and salt

== Places ==
- Sōya District, Hokkaido, a district located in the Sōya Subprefecture, Hokkaido, Japan
- Sōya Subprefecture, a subprefecture of the Hokkaido Prefecture, Japan
- Sōya Main Line, a railway line in Hokkaido, Japan

== Ships ==
- Japanese cruiser Soya, originally the Russian cruiser Varyag, launched 1900
- Sōya (icebreaker), a Japanese icebreaker
- MV Soya VII, a Swedish coastal tanker

== People ==
- Soya (singer) (born 1990), South Korean singer
- Carl Erik Soya (1896–1983), Danish author and dramatist
- Willi Soya (1935–1990), German footballer
- Yelena Soya (born 1981), Russian synchro-swimmer

== Geographical features ==
- Sōya Strait, or La Pérouse Strait, the strait between Hokkaido, Japan, and Sakhalin, Russia
- Cape Sōya, situated in Wakkanai, the northernmost point of the island of Hokkaido, Japan

== Other uses ==
- Soya Group, a Swedish corporate group including the Wallenius Lines, Wallfast and Wallenius Water companies

== See also ==
- Soy (disambiguation)
- Soja (disambiguation)
- Soia (disambiguation)
- Soi (disambiguation)
- SOJ (disambiguation)
