= Get Wiser =

Studio album by SOJA
- Released: January 24, 2006
- Recorded: 2005
- Studio: LION and FOX Studios, Washington, D.C.
- Genre: Reggae
- Length: 58:25
- Label: Innerloop
- Producer: Jim Fox

SOJA chronology
| Dub in a Time of War (2005) | Get Wiser (2006) | Get Wiser Live DVD (2007) |

Get Wiser is the second full-length studio album by the reggae band SOJA that was released in January 2006. The album release party was held at The State Theatre in Falls Church, Virginia and was filmed for the Get Wiser Live DVD.

== Track listing ==
1. "Open My Eyes"
2. "By My Side" (featuring Junior Marvin)
3. "My Life Alone"
4. "Faith Works"
5. "What Would...?"
6. "Strong for Them"
7. "Can't Tell Me" (featuring Carmelo Romero)
8. "Be Aware"
9. "I've Got Time"
10. "Sorry" (featuring Go-Go Mickey)
11. "Bring Back Truth"
12. "You Don't Know Me" (featuring Junior Marvin)
13. "911"
14. "Devils" (featuring the Eddie Drennon String Quartet)
