= Strength to Survive =

Studio album by SOJA
- Released: January 31, 2012
- Recorded: 2010–2012
- Genre: Reggae; reggae rock
- Length: 52:56
- Label: ATO
- Producer: John Alagia

SOJA chronology
Born in Babylon (2009)	Strength to Survive (2012)	Amid the Noise and Haste (2014)

Strength to Survive is the sixth-studio album by American reggae band SOJA. It was released on January 31, 2012, with the record label ATO Records.

== Commercial performance ==
Strength to Survive debuted at number 36 on the Billboard 200 chart, and number one on the Top Reggae Albums. As of July 2014, the album had sold 60,000 copies in the United States.

== Track listing ==
All tracks by Jacob Hemphill except where noted.

1. "Mentality" – 4:07
2. "Strength to Survive" – 3:24
3. "Everything Changes" – 5:05
4. "Don't Worry" – 3:23
5. "Tell Me" – 3:33
6. "It's Not Too Late" – 3:34
7. "Gone Today" – 3:58
8. "Let You Go" – 3:40
9. "Not Done Yet" – 4:14
10. "Slow Down" – 4:01
11. "Be with Me Now" – 5:32
12. "When We Were Younger" – 4:27
13. "Gone Today" (acoustic 2010) – 3:58
14. "Jah Is Listening Now" (acoustic 2010) – 3:28
15. "She Still Loves Me" (acoustic 2010) – 4:30
16. "Prison Blues" (acoustic 2011) – 5:37

== Charts ==
Chart performance for Strength to Survive
Chart (2013–2014)	Peak position
US Billboard 200	36
US Independent Albums (Billboard)	2
US Reggae Albums (Billboard)	1
