= SOJ =

SOJ or variant, may refer to:

== Places ==
- Jefferson (proposed Pacific state), the State of Jefferson (SOJ, SoJ), a movement in Northern California that is attempting to split the state of California, to make the 51st of the union.
- Sørkjosen Airport (IATA airport code SOJ), Nordreisa, Troms, Norway
- Sarojini Nagar station (Station code SOJ), South West Delhi, Delhi, India; see List of railway stations in India

== Other uses ==
- Single Open Jaw, a kind of Open Jaw, used for calculating fares
- Small-outline J-lead Package (SOJ), a type of small-outline integrated circuit (SOIC)
- Soi language (ISO 639 language code soj), a Central Iranian language
- Phoenix Wright: Ace Attorney - Spirit of Justice (SoJ), a 2016 video game
- Standoff jammer, Airborne electronic warfare system

== See also ==
- S0J, the postal code for MacDowall, Saskatchewan, Canada
- State of Jefferson (disambiguation)
- Soia (disambiguation)
- Soja (disambiguation)
- Soya (disambiguation)
- Soy (disambiguation)
- Soi (disambiguation)
