= Peace of Mind (Rebelution album) =

Studio album by Rebelution
- Released: January 10, 2012
- Genre: Reggae
- Length: 45:45
- Label: Red Distribution
- Producer: Michael Goldwasser, others

Rebelution chronology
Bright Side of Life (2009)	Peace of Mind (2012)	Count Me In (2014)

Peace of Mind is the third studio album released by Rebelution, released through their own label 87 Music on January 10, 2012. The label, in partnership with Controlled Substance Sound Labs, simultaneously released two additional versions of the entire record as a multi-length triple album. Peace of Mind: Acoustic features all twelve original album tracks stripped down acoustic as well as Peace of Mind: Dub remixed by Easy Star’s Michael Goldwasser (Dub Side of The Moon, Radiodread, Easy Star’s Lonely Hearts Dub Band). The album debuted at #13 on the Billboard top 200 charts, #1 Independent and #1 Reggae selling 16,000 copies in its first week, despite giving away half the album free to their fans over the 6 weeks prior to release.

== Track listing ==
No.	Title	Length
1.	"Sky Is the Limit"	4:09
2.	"Comfort Zone"	3:13
3.	"Good Vibes (feat. Lutan Fyah)"	3:31
4.	"Route Around"	3:52
5.	"Meant to Be (feat. Jacob Hemphill of SOJA)"	3:21
6.	"Life on the Line"	4:04
7.	"Closer I Get (feat. John Popper)"	3:30
8.	"Lady in White"	4:00
9.	"So High (feat. Zumbi of Zion I)"	4:56
10.	"Day By Day"	3:04
11.	"Calling Me Out"	4:50
12.	"Honeypot"	3:15
