= Strictly Global =

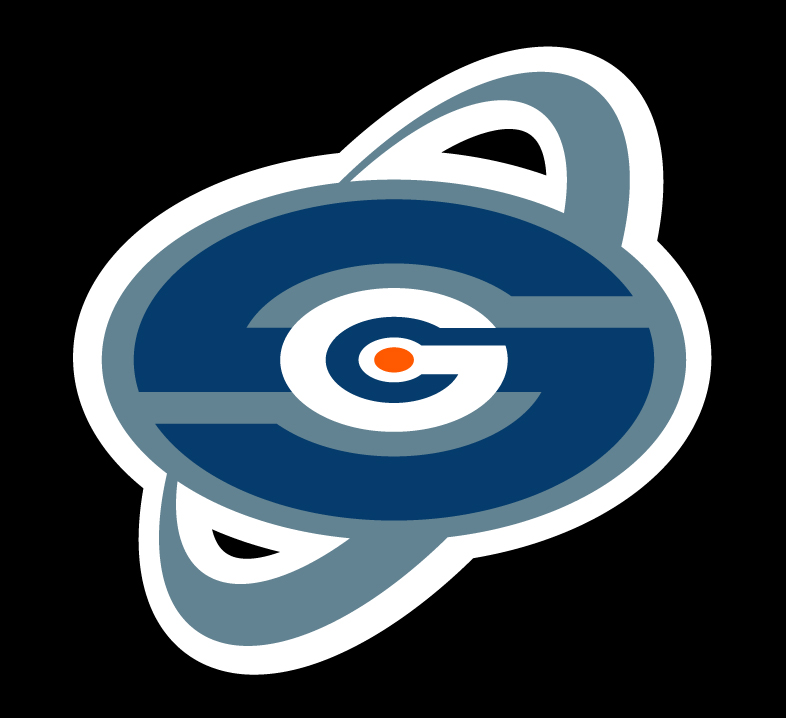
- Genre: Music
- Directed by: Terrance Averett
- Presented by: Dawn Reed and Danni Rosner
- Country of origin: United States
- Original language: English

Production
- Production locations: Filmed at the State Theatre; Falls Church, Virginia, United States
- Running time: One hour (2004–2007); Two hours (2007–2011)
- Production company: MHz Networks

Original release
- Network: MHz WorldView
- Release: November 19, 2004 – June 3, 2011

Strictly Global is an American weekly music television program that aired from November 19, 2004, to June 3, 2011. It showcased music videos covering every genre of music from every corner of the globe. The program highlights international artists as well as independent and ethnic American talent. The program was produced by MHz Networks, and was broadcast every Friday night on MHz WorldView.

== History ==
The program premiered on November 19, 2004. Co-produced and co-hosted by Terrance Averett and Mike Leyva, it was originally launched as an hour-long program airing at 9 PM ET. When Levya left the station in May 2005, Averett became sole producer and host. In 2007, Averett became senior producer and A.C. Evans and Jennifer Roh became alternating hosts, with occasional appearances by Averett. In the same year, it expanded to a two-hour block and started airing at 8 PM and 11 PM ET.

Season 7 saw new hosts: Dawn Reed, Danni Rosner, and Christina Tkacik. The show was shot at the State Theatre, in Falls Church, Virginia. It is hosted in English, but music videos encompass a wide array of languages.

The program reached 30 million households across the U.S.

== Hosts ==
Dawn Reed

Born March 2, 1981 in Misawa, Aomori, Japan, Reed is an American actress, model, director and television personality. She is most known as the hostess and VJ for the international music video television show Strictly Global. Reed joined the program in 2008, during its seventh season. She is also credited as an associate producer and editor for the show, and is a regular blogger for its website.

In 2009, Reed created a new segment called "Beat Kitchen" which showcases recipes inspired by music videos.

Danni Rosner

A multilingual singer who grew up in Tokyo, Rosner returned to the United States during high school. An alumna of the Virginia Polytechnic Institute and State University, she holds degrees in musical analysis and English and has worked as a television reporter in Italy, a touring blues singer, and has sung the National Anthem at major sports venues in D.C. (Nationals Park, RFK Stadium, Verizon Center).

== Nextwave ==
In its sixth season, the show introduced the new segment, "Nextwave", that spotlights new independent artists and bands with culturally diverse sounds and perspectives. Footage of Nextwave artists is featured between music videos during Strictly Global, as well as online. The segment is introduced with a short biography of the artist or band followed by their music video.

Nextwave was launched on March 27, 2008, with singer-songwriter Sona Kay as the segment's first featured artist. Kay gave a short interview and performed two of her songs "Fight For Me" and "Contra Corriente" on the guitar.

The segment is shot at the 8101A Studio.

== Cancellation ==
The program's last new episode was aired on June 3, 2011.
