= Soia =

Soia or SOIA may refer to:

== People ==
- Soia Mentschikoff (1915–1984) a Russian-American lawyer
- Elena Soia (born 1981), a Russian swimmer

== Places ==
- Soiano del Lago (Gardesano: Soià), Brescia, Lombardy, Italy

== Groups, organizations, companies ==
- Sick of It All, an American hardcore punk band
- System for the Observation of and Information on the Alps, see List of organizations with .int domain names

== Other uses ==
- Sick of It All (EP), a 1997 record by the eponymous American band
- Simultaneous offset instrument approach, a type of instrument approach in aviation
- Security of Information Act, a Canadian Official Secrets law

== See also ==
- Soja (disambiguation)
- Soya (disambiguation)
- Soy (disambiguation)
- Soi (disambiguation)
- SOJ (disambiguation)
