= SOJA – Live in Hawaii =

Video by SOJA
- Released: January 8, 2009
- Recorded: January 9–20, 2008
- Genre: Reggae
- Producer: Marc Carlini

SOJA chronology
Stars & Stripes EP (2008)	SOJA – Live in Hawaii (2009)

SOJA – Live in Hawaii is a DVD recorded between January 9 and January 20, 2008, by reggae band SOJA in Oahu, Maui, and Kailua-Kona. It was directed and produced by Marc Carlini and was released on January 8, 2009.

== Track listing ==
1. Sorry
2. Revolution
3. Be Aware
4. You Don't Know Me
5. By My Side
6. Stars and Stripes
7. Rasta Courage
8. To Whom It May Concern
9. Peace In A Time Of War
10. Open My Eyes
11. Faith Works
12. Bleed Through
13. Can't Tell Me
14. True Love
15. 911
