= Unified Highway =

Reggae duo

- Origin: Isla Vista, California
- Genres: Reggae; pop reggae; R&B; funk; dub; hip hop
- Years active: 2014–present
- Members: Eric Rachmany; AmpLive
- Website: https://www.unifiedhighway.com

Unified Highway is an American reggae musical duo formed in Isla Vista, California. It consists of Eric Rachmany of the band Rebelution and DJ AmpLive, formerly of Zion I.

== History ==
The band was formed in 2014. Rachmany started the group so he could incorporate other styles into his music besides reggae, which he is mostly known for. They released their self-titled debut album in 2016.

Unified Highway released their second album Headlines in 2020. The album is led by the single "Unique" featuring Reverie.

== Discography ==
Studio Albums
Title	Released	Label		
"Unified Highway"	March 4, 2016	MRI/Unified Highway		
"Headlines"	April 24, 2020	Easy Star Records	”Invisible Route”	October 19, 2024

Singles
Title	Released	Album
"Losing My Religion"	January 29, 2016	Unified Highway
"Are You That Somebody"	December 1, 2016	Headlines
"Unique" (featuring Reverie)	April 15, 2020	Headlines
"The Truth" (SubDocta Remix)	January 22, 2021	Non-album single

Remix Albums
Title	Released	Label
"Unified Highway (Remix Album)"	June 22, 2016	Audible Collision
