= Falling into Place (Rebelution album) =

Falling Into Place

Studio album by Rebelution
- Released: June 3, 2016
- Genre: Reggae rock
- Label: Easy Star Records

Rebelution chronology
Count Me In (2014)	Falling Into Place (2016)	Free Rein (2018)

Falling Into Place is the sixth album by California band Rebelution, released on June 3, 2016. The collection is a joint venture between their 87 Music label and NYC-based Easy Star Records. A dozen years into the group's stirring career with over 450,000 albums sold independently, the release of this new album finds the group more energized than ever. Frontman, Eric Rachmany states, “We named the album Falling Into Place because all of our varied inspirations and experiences came together into one cohesive collection of music that we all really love.” Falling Into Place mingles stories of love gained and lost with reminiscences of years gone by (Pretty Lady, Those Days, Santa Barbara) and socially pertinent songs like Know It All, which challenges the hatred in an ever-more-violent world and a fraught political environment. Jamaican deejay and one time tour-mate Protoje adds guest vocals on Inhale Exhale, an intense earworm celebrating the movement towards further legalization of marijuana.

Following a special performance at the legendary Red Rocks Amphitheater on June 3, Rebelution's Falling Into Place Summer Tour officially kicked off in New York on June 7, 2016, continuing through August nationwide. The band was joined by their friends The Green + J Boog, Stick Figure, Through The Roots and DJ Mackle on most dates.

== Track listing ==
No.	Title	Length
1.	"Know It All"	3:08
2.	"Inhale Exhale" (featuring Protoje)	3:07
3.	"Upper Hand"	3:11
4.	"Lay My Claim"	4:02
5.	"Pretty Lady"	3:39
6.	"Santa Barbara"	3:19
7.	"Those Days"	3:43
8.	"Free Up Your Mind"	3:24
9.	"Mirage"	3:25
10.	"High on Life"	3:01
11.	"Breakdown"	3:53
Total length:		37:52

== Charts ==
Chart (2016)	Peak position
US Billboard 200	32
US Independent Albums (Billboard)	3
US Reggae Albums (Billboard)	1
US Top Tastemaker Albums (Billboard)	14
