= Soy (disambiguation) =

Soy refers to soybean, a species of legume native to East Asia (soya).

Soy or SOY may also refer to:

== Food products ==
- Soy sauce, a fermented sauce made from soybeans
- Soy milk, a beverage made from soybeans
- Soy protein, protein derived from soybeans

== Music ==
- Soy (Alejandra Guzmán album), the tenth studio album by Alejandra Guzmán
- Soy (Cynthia album), the debut album by Cynthia
- Soy (Debi Nova album), second studio album by Debi Nova
- Soy (Ednita Nazario album), the 20th studio album Ednita Nazario
- Soy (Julio Iglesias album) by Julio Iglesias
- Soy (Lali Espósito album), by Lali
  - "Soy" (song), by Lali
  - Soy Tour, a world tour by Lali
- Soy (Victor Manuelle album), by Victor Manuelle

== Languages ==
- One of the Romance copula forms, using ser from Spanish (first person, "I am".)

== Other uses ==
- Soy templates, a web templating language that is part of the Google Closure Tools system
- Soy, a village in the municipality of Érezée
- SOY, the IATA code for Stronsay Airport in the United Kingdom
- Soy boy, a pejorative term

== See also ==
- Soya (disambiguation)
- Soja (disambiguation)
- Soia (disambiguation)
- Soi (disambiguation)
- SOJ (disambiguation)
