= Lou Perez (comedian) =

American comedian

- Notable work: That Joke Isn't Funny Anymore: On the Death and Rebirth of Comedy

Comedy career
- Genres: Satire, Parody
- Subjects: Politics, Online Culture, Political Correctness
- Website: https://www.TheLouPerez.com

Lou Perez is an American comedian, author, and producer.

== Biography ==
He attended New York University.

=== Stand-up comedy ===
Perez began doing improv and sketch comedy while an undergrad at New York University, where he was part of the comedy group the Wicked Wicked Hammerkatz. During his formative years in stand-up, Perez performed at the Upright Citizens Brigade Theater (both in New York City and Los Angeles) in sketch shows with the Wicked Wicked Hammerkatz and as part of a his comedy duo, Greg and Lou. Greg and Lou is best known for its sketch "Wolverine's Claws Suck."

As a stand-up comedian, Perez has opened for Rob Schneider, Rich Vos, Jimmy Dore, Dave Smith. He has performed at the Big Pine Comedy Festival, Bridgetown Comedy Festival, and Punching Up Comedy at Freedom Fest. Perez toured the United States and Canada with Scott Thompson of The Kids In The Hall.

=== Writing ===
Perez was the head writer for the comedy channel We the Internet TV, which was nominated in 2017 for a Webby award. Perez has also written for The Blaze's Align and for Fox Sports' @TheBuzzer. His first book, That Joke Isn't Funny Anymore: On the Death and Rebirth of Comedy, was published by Bombardier Books in 2022. Perez taught creative writing at the City College of New York, "writing the web series" for Writing Pad, and comedy writing workshops for the Moving Picture Institute.

=== Hosting ===
Perez hosts the live debate series The Wrong Take, and an eponymous podcast, The Lou Perez Podcast. He previously hosted the stand-up show Uncle Lou's Safe Place in Los Angeles, and co-created the political comedy podcast Unsafe Space.

=== Producing ===
Perez was the head producer of the comedy channel We the Internet TV. He produced The Attendants with Lorne Michaels’s Broadway Video, and was a comedy producer on TruTV's Impractical Jokers. Perez has also produced live shows with Colin Quinn, the Icarus Festival, and the Rutherford Comedy Festival. He has also produced sketch comedy for Comedy Is Murder.

=== Political views ===
Perez describes himself as a libertarian, and has appeared at Libertarian Party and Moms for Liberty events. In 2020 he authored an opinion piece in The Wall Street Journal titled "How I Became a ‘Far-Right Radical’," complaining that he and other "heterodox" figures had been mislabeled as "far right" by academics. Perez regularly appears on the conservative programs Gutfeld!, FOX News Primetime, One Nation with Brian Kilmeade, and the political debate program Open to Debate (with comedian Michael Ian Black).

=== Advising ===
Perez is a FAIR-in-the-arts fellow and is on the advisory board of Heresy Press. He is also a brand ambassador for XX-XY Athletics, a sportswear company that has been criticized as being anti-trans. Perez worked with The Foundation for Individual Rights and Expression as Communications Manager as a producer and consultant.
