= Bright Side of Life (album) =

Studio album by Rebelution
- Released: August 4, 2009
- Genre: Reggae, reggae rock
- Length: 48:35
- Label: Controlled Substance Sound Labs

Rebelution chronology
Courage to Grow (2007)	Bright Side of Life (2009)	Peace of Mind (2012)

Bright Side of Life is the second album by reggae/rock group Rebelution. It was released on August 4, 2009, under Controlled Substance Sound Labs.

== Track listing ==
No.	Title	Length
1.	"Bright Side of Life"	4:05
2.	"More than Ever"	3:41
3.	"Outta Control"	4:05
4.	"From the Window"	4:39
5.	"Suffering"	4:04
6.	"Too Rude"	3:25
7.	"Dubzilla"	2:15
8.	"Bump"	5:23
9.	"Lazy Afternoon"	3:30
10.	"Moonlight"	4:20
11.	"Change the System"	4:51
12.	"Wake Up Call"	4:17
13.	"More Than Dub" (bonus track)	4:00
Total length:		48:35

- Change The System is a re-recorded version of the song from their 2006 EP Rebelution.

== Credits ==
Performers

- Eric Rachmany - Lead and Backing Vocals, Electric and Acoustic Guitar
- Rory Carey - Keyboards, Grand Piano, Hammond B3 Organ, Rhodes Piano
- Wesley Finley - Drums, Percussion, Backing Vocals
- Marley D. Williams - Bass Guitar
- Jeff Elliot - Saxophone
- Craig Thomas - Trumpet

Additional Credits

- Recording Engineer - Gene Cornelius
- Mixed and Mastered - Jim Fox
- Dub effects - Donovan Haney, Jim Fox and Rebelution
- Art and Design - Abel Aquino

== Reviews ==
- Allmusic
