= SOJA (EP) =

EP by SOJA
- Released: 2000
- Recorded: LION and FOX Studios, Washington, D.C.
- Genre: Reggae, dub
- Length: 37:06
- Label: Self-released

SOJA chronology
SOJA (2000)	Peace in a Time of War (2003)

SOJA is a studio EP by the reggae band SOJA (Soldiers of Jah Army) that was released in 2000. The album was recorded in the fall of 2000 at LION and FOX Studios in Washington, D.C.

== Reception ==
According to Reggae Reviews, "It contains only four songs and their respective dubs, but all of the rich roots sound you've come to expect from the group is here in full force. SOJA EP is about as good a reggae EP an as you're gonna find, as it set the stage for SOJA's exemplary full-length releases."

== Track listing ==
1. "Nuclear Bomb"
2. "Zion Livity"
3. "Freedom Time"
4. "Watch Them"
5. "Atomic Dub"
6. "Livity Dub"
7. "Makonnen Dub"
8. "A Stray Dub"
