= Styrene-oxide isomerase =

Identifiers
- EC no.: 5.3.99.7
- CAS no.: 124541-89-5

Databases
- IntEnz: IntEnz view
- BRENDA: BRENDA entry
- ExPASy: NiceZyme view
- KEGG: KEGG entry
- MetaCyc: metabolic pathway
- PRIAM: profile
- PDB structures: RCSB PDB PDBe PDBsum
- Gene Ontology: AmiGO / QuickGO
Search
- PMC: articles
- PubMed: articles
- NCBI: proteins

Styrene-oxide isomerase (EC 5.3.99.7) is an enzyme that catalyzes the chemical reaction

styrene oxide
phenylacetaldehyde

The enzyme converts its substrate, styrene oxide, to phenylacetaldehyde. It belongs to the family of isomerases, specifically a class of other intramolecular oxidoreductases. The systematic name of this enzyme class is styrene-oxide isomerase (epoxide-cleaving). This enzyme is also called SOI and participates in styrene degradation: the reaction is the second step of the pathway after the epoxidation of styrene by styrene monooxygenase.

SOI is an integral membrane protein consisting of four transmembrane helices. It forms a novel homo-trimeric assembly, displaying a structural fold reminiscent of ion channels, as determined by cryogenic electron microscopy.

The trimeric organization of SOI is essential for its function and is guided by the ferric heme b prosthetic group positioned at the interface of its subunits. This ferric heme b acts as a Lewis acid, interacting with the epoxide oxygen atom to facilitate epoxide ring-opening of substrates.
