= Keznamdi =

Jamaican reggae musician (born 1991)

- Born: Keznamdi McDonald; October 18, 1991 (age 35); Kingston, Jamaica
- Genres: Reggae; roots reggae
- Occupation: Musician
- Instrument: Guitar
- Years active: 2010s–present
- Label: Keznamdi Music Group
- Award: Grammy Award for Best Reggae Album
- Website: keznamdi.com

Keznamdi McDonald (born October 18, 1991), known professionally as Keznamdi, is a Jamaican reggae musician, rooted in the roots reggae revival movement, alongside contemporaries such as Protoje, Jesse Royal, and Kabaka Pyramid. He won the Grammy Award for Best Reggae Album in 2026.

== Early life and education ==
Keznamdi was born in Kingston, Jamaica, and raised in a musical family. His parents were members of the reggae group Chakula.

He attended Campion College, a co-educational secondary school in Kingston, before transferring to St. George's College. It was not until he relocated to Florida to live with his mother that he began recording music seriously.

== Career ==
Keznamdi emerged as part of the reggae revival movement, blending traditional roots reggae, while incorporating elements of hip-hop and soul with modern production techniques. His early work gained traction with the release of his 2013 EP Bridging the Gap, which topped reggae charts on iTunes and Billboard.

He continued to develop his sound, gaining recognition for themes centered on social justice and consciousness, identity, resilience, empowerment, and African identity. His music has been described as a fusion of roots reggae and modern influences.

In 2025, Keznamdi released his album Blxxd & Fyah, which would become a defining project in his career.

== Awards and nominations ==
=== Grammy Awards ===
- 2026 – Winner, Best Reggae Album – Blxxd & Fyah
- 2026 – Nominee, Best Reggae Album – Blxxd & Fyah (first nomination)

Keznamdi won the award at the 68th Annual Grammy Awards, marking his first nomination and win in the category.

== Selected discography ==
- Bridging the Gap EP (2013)
- Blxxd & Fyah (2025)
