= Lou Perez (musician) =

- Born: June 21, 1928; New York City, New York, U.S.
- Died: May 27, 2005 (aged 76) New York City, New York
- Genres: Charanga
- Instruments: Flute, piano, violin

Lou Pérez (June 21, 1928 – May 27, 2005) was an American flautist, pianist, violinist, bandleader, composer and arranger. He was one of the most influential and popular charanga musicians in the 1960s and 1970s, and his music was used in the film Dirty Dancing.

== Early life ==
He was born in New York City, to parents from Puerto Rico and Cuba. At the age of four, he moved with his father to Manzanillo, Cuba, and then to Havana, returning to New York when he was nine years old. He studied music, first playing the bass before moving to the saxophone, flute, and percussion.

== Career ==
As a young musician, he was involved in the bands of Gilberto Valdés, Noro Morales, Belisario López and others, before forming his own band at the height of the charanga craze in New York in the early-1960s. Before mentioning his soloist career, let's point out from a 2004 interview where he discussed he used to play the violin. Plus on the very same interview, one can appreciate a photo showcasing Lou playing the piano as well on the far left with a light color coat and black tuxedo pants. He had several successful album releases, including Para La Fiesta Voy (1961), Bon Bon de Chocolate! (1962), Tamboleo (1964), Of Latin Extraction (1966), Barrio (1972), Fantasia Africana (1975), and Nuestra Herencia (1976). In all, he recorded 15 albums, and also recorded music for films and commercials. His song "De Todo un Poco", from his 1977 album of the same name, was used on the soundtrack to the hit movie Dirty Dancing in 1987, and his earlier albums became collector's items.

== Death ==
He died at the age of 76, from injuries he sustained when he was hit by a car while crossing a street in Manhattan.
