= Kabaka Pyramid =

Musical artist

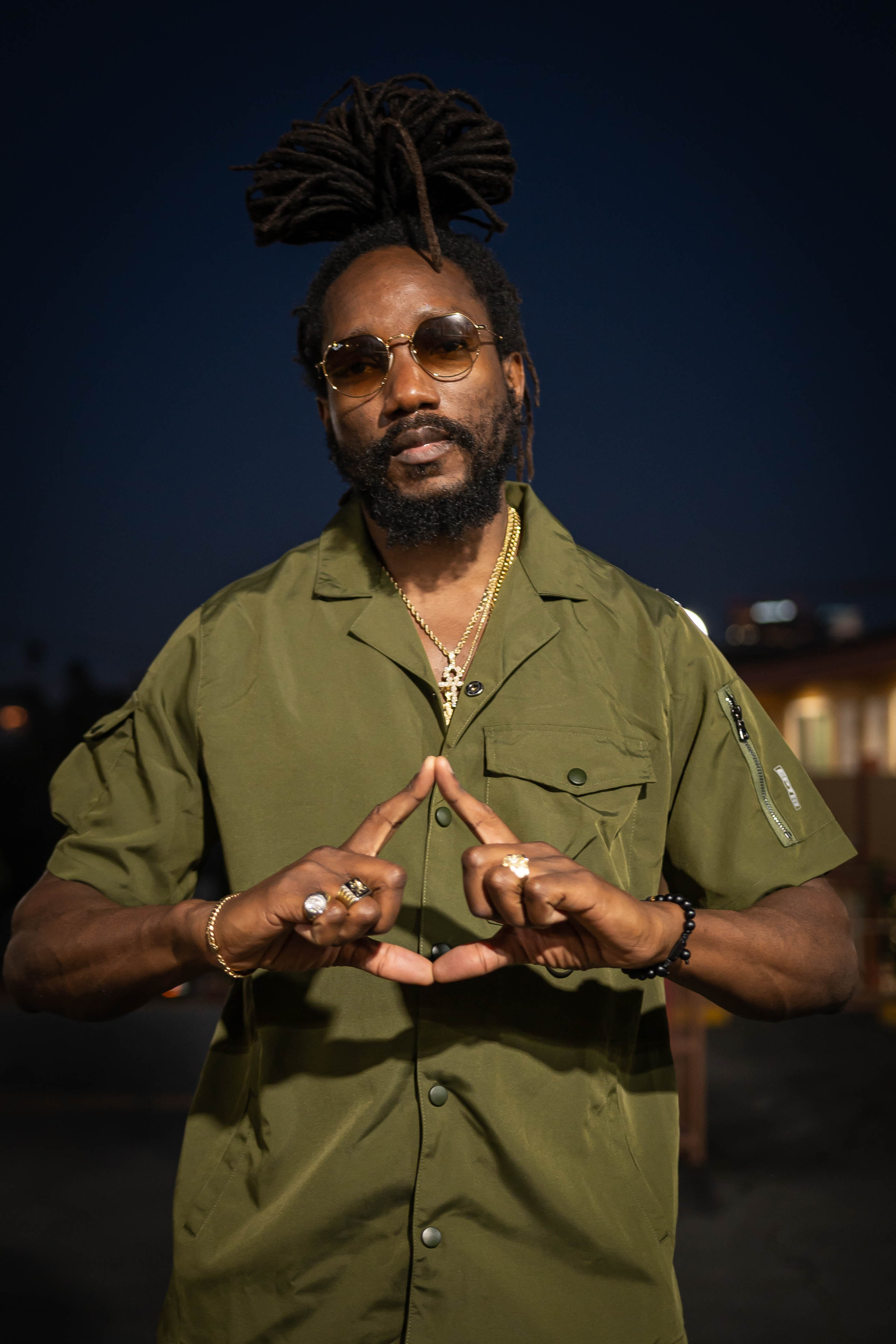

Background information
- Birth name: Keron Salmon
- Born: April 19, 1985 (age 40)
- Genres: Reggae; hip hop; dancehall
- Occupations: Singer; songwriter
- Labels: Bebble Rock
- Website: www.kabakapmusic.com

Keron Salmon (born April 19, 1985), known professionally as Kabaka Pyramid, is a reggae artist from Kingston, Jamaica. His music blends elements of roots reggae, dancehall and rap. He cites influences from both hip-hop artists, such as Raekwon of the Wu-Tang Clan, and roots reggae performers, including Peter Tosh.

== Career ==
Keron began his musical career in the late 1990s, writing lyrics, rapping, and experimenting with beat-making and sampling tools alongside friends from his high school in the Hope Pastures area. During this period, he used his family's living room as an improvised recording studio.

After completing high school in 2002, Keron moved to Fort Lauderdale, where he further developed his skills with an emphasis on hip-hop. During this time, he adopted the stage name Kabaka Pyramid, combining "Kabaka," a Ugandan royal title, with "Pyramid," referencing the ancient Egyptian structures. The name reflects both his Rastafarian connection to Africa and his interest in Egypt as a symbol of preserved knowledge, which he also associates with lyrical content in music.

Following the release of his earlier mixtapes, which leaned more toward rap, Kabaka began integrating reggae influences more prominently into his music around 2007, particularly through his collaboration with the collective Bebble Rock.

In 2011, he recorded the Rebel Music EP at Protoje’s home studio. Two years later, he met Damian Marley, leading to their first collaboration, Well Done, which featured Marley's On The Corner Riddim and lyrics by Kabaka Pyramid. Their partnership continued, with Marley producing Kabaka Pyramid’s 2018 album Kontraband and contributing to five tracks on the 2022 album The Kalling, which was fully recorded at Marley's studio in Miami.

Kabaka Pyramid has performed at various international music festivals, including multiple appearances at events such as Summerjam or Rototom Sunsplash.

== Selected discography ==
=== Albums and EPs ===
- 2011: Rebel Music (EP)
- 2013: Lead the Way (EP)
- 2018: Kontraband
- 2022: The Kalling

=== Mixtapes ===
- 2007: The Transition Volume I
- 2009: The Transition Volume II
- 2016: Accurate by Walshy Fire

=== Singles ===
- 2012: Final Move ft. (Cornadoor)
- 2013: Mi Alright ft. (Chronixx)
- 2013: Strive ft.(Exco Levi)
- 2015: Well Done
- 2016: High & Windy ft. (Sara Lugo)
- 2019: Hold Up Your Arms ft. (Capleton)

=== Guest Appearances ===
- 2015: The Flame on the album Ancient Future by Protoje
- 2017: Generations will Rize on the album New Era Frequenzy by Nattali Rize
- 2017: Suit & Tie on album Epistles of Mama by Stonebwoy
- 2021: 2020 Vision on the album In The Moment by Rebelution
- 2023: Nah Sell Out on the album Destiny by Alborosie

== Awards and nominations ==
Year	Award	Category	Result	Ref.
2014	Jamaican Reggae Industry Association	Emerging New Artiste Of The Year	Won	
2014	Juno Award	Reggae Recording of the Year	Won	
2023	Grammy Award	Best Reggae Album	Won	
