= State Theatre (Falls Church, Virginia) =

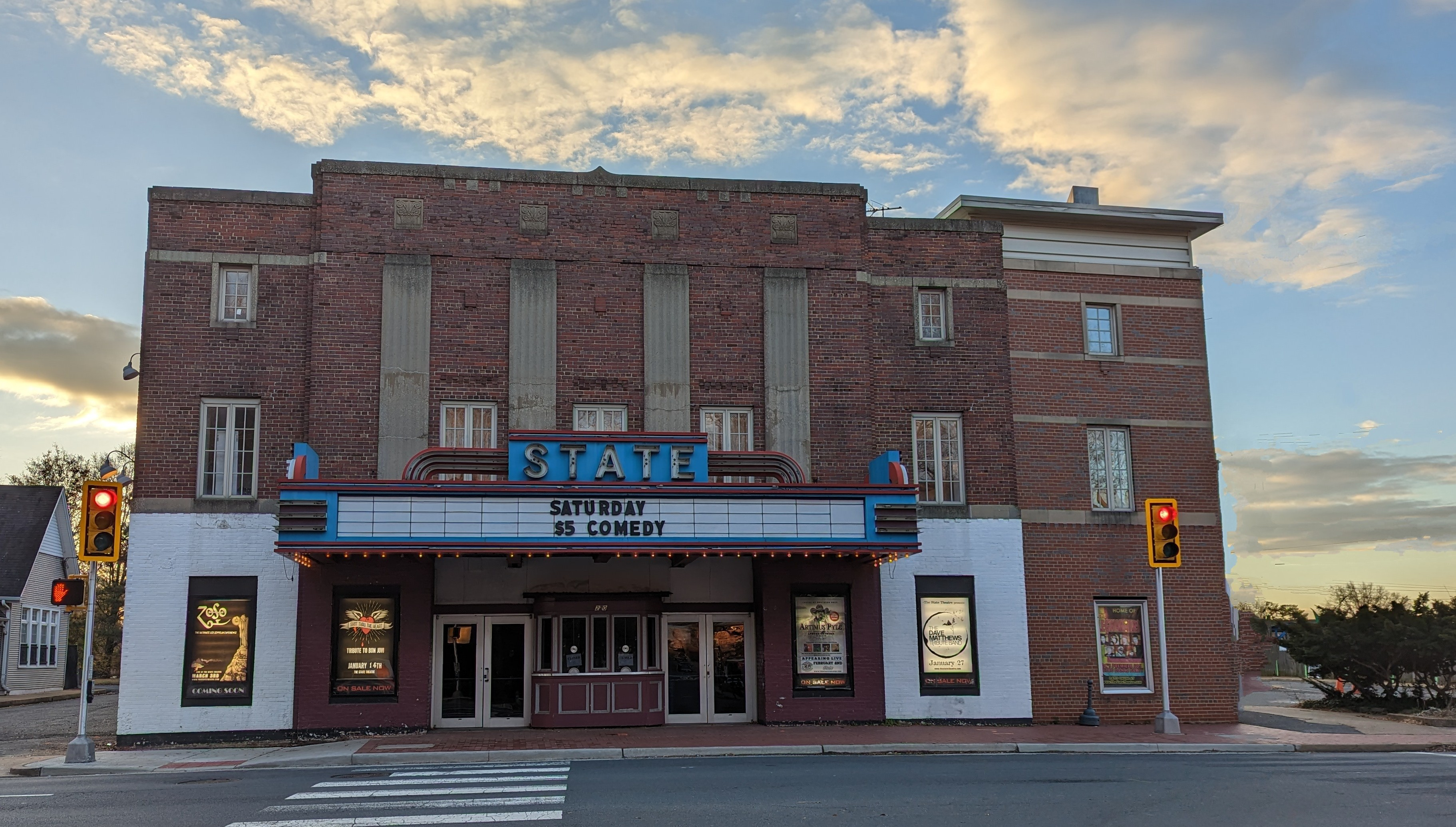
- The State Theatre
- Interactive map of State Theatre
- Address: 220 N Washington St; Falls Church, Virginia 22046-4517
- Location: Washington metropolitan area
- Coordinates: 38.8829°N 77.1696°W
- Owner: Timeless Entertainment
- Capacity: 850

Construction
- Opened: January 27, 1936

Website
- Venue Website
- Building details

General information
- Renovated: 1998-99
- Renovation cost: $2 million ($3.95 million in 2025 dollars)

Renovating team
- Architect: Martinez+Johnson

The State Theatre is a restaurant and concert venue in Falls Church, Virginia. Built in 1936, the venue operated as a movie theater until 1988. The theatre reopened in 1999 as an events hall and music theatre. The closest Metro station is the East Falls Church Metro station.

== About ==
It was one of the first theatres on the East Coast to be air-conditioned centrally. It was the flagship of the family-owned "Neighborhood Theatres" chain which also operated: the Glebe Theater and Buckingham Theater in Arlington County, Virginia and the Jefferson Theater in Falls Church, VA.

The first film shown was Thanks a Million starring Dick Powell. On November 27, 1988, the State closed its doors after a final showing of Die Hard starring Bruce Willis. A multimillion-dollar restoration in the late 1990s turned it into a venue for live music and private events. The full theatrical stage is original, as are the 200 balcony seats and the two lobbies.

It hosted Strictly Global, a weekly music-television program for nearly seven years, from 2004 to 2011.

== Noted performers ==
- 3
- The AAA Girls
- Animal Liberation Orchestra
- Blondie
- Buddy Guy
- Corey Smith
- Devo
- Electric Light Orchestra
- Gin Blossoms
- Cipes and the People
- Gregg Allman
- Hanson
- Jimmie's Chicken Shack
- Jimmy Buffett and the Coral Reefer Band
- Jimmy Cliff
- John Mayer
- Johnny Winter
- Jonny Lang
- Leon Russell
- Mason Jennings
- Mat Kearney
- Monte Montgomery
- Nappy Brown
- Patrick Monahan
- The Psychedelic Furs
- Quinn Sullivan
- Rata Blanca
- Shooter Jennings
- UFO
- Wu-Tang Clan
- X
- Yngwie Malmsteen
