= SOJA =

American reggae band

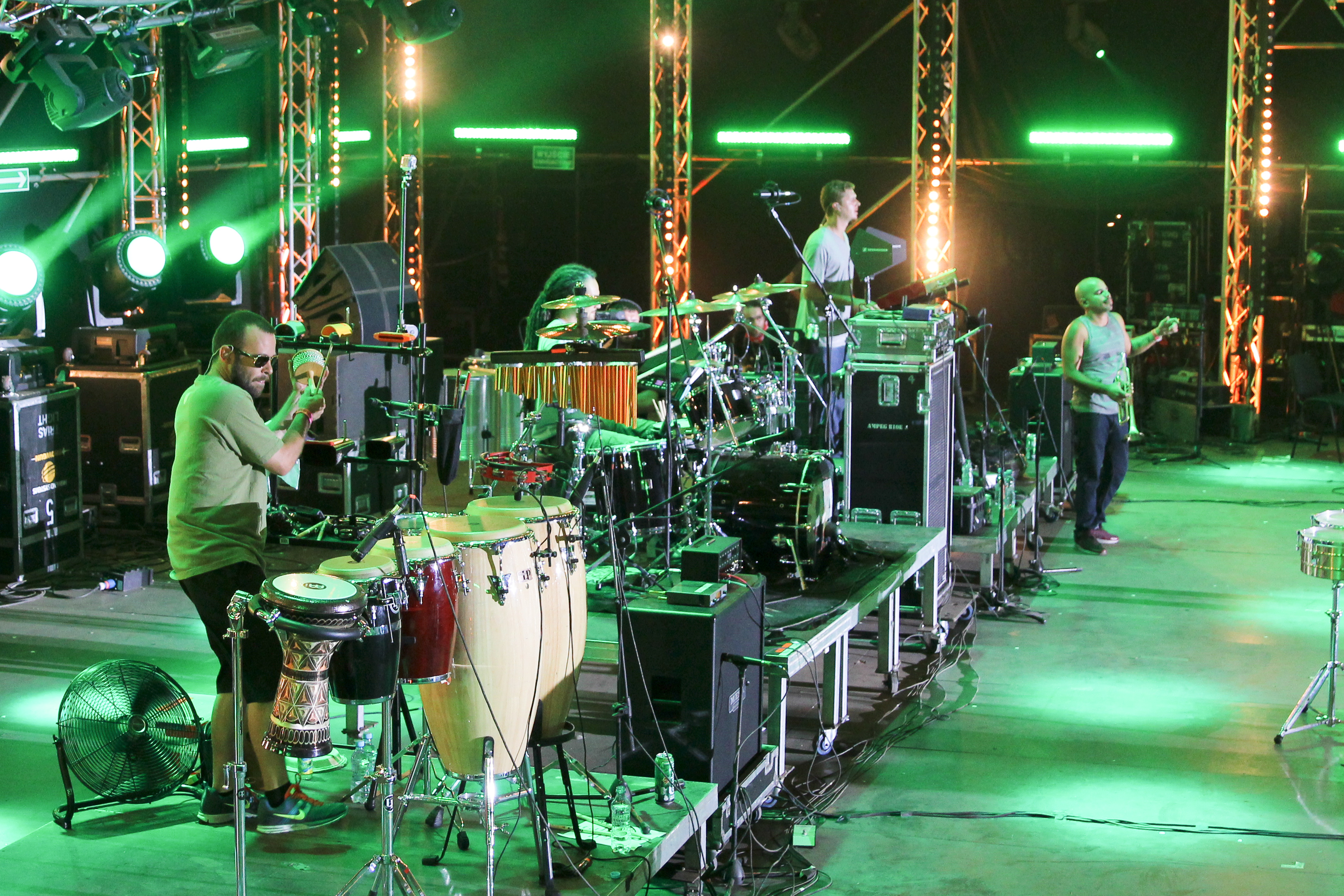
- SOJA at Przystanek Woodstock 2013

Background information
- Origin: Arlington, Virginia, U.S.
- Genres: Reggae, reggae rock
- Years active: 1997–present
- Labels: ATO; MapleMusic (Canada); DMV; Innerloop
- Members: Jacob Hemphill; Bob Jefferson; Ryan "Byrd" Berty; Ken Brownell; Patrick O'Shea; Hellman Escorcia; Rafael Rodriguez; Trevor Young
- Website: sojamusic.com

SOJA (an acronym of Soldiers of Jah Army) is an American reggae band based in Arlington, Virginia. Formed in 1997, their music is currently produced under ATO Records. The eight-member band has released a number of singles, albums, and DVDs, including SOJA – Live in Hawaii. Their third full-length album Born in Babylon peaked at number 11 on the Top Heatseekers chart, while their 2012 album Strength to Survive topped the Billboard Reggae Album Chart. The band continues to tour and record new music.

== History ==
=== 1997–2005: Founding, early releases ===
Before the band was founded, the members had performed together on and off for some years. Frontman Jacob Hemphill (vocals, guitar) and Bob Jefferson (bass) met in first grade shortly after Hemphill had returned with his family from living in Africa, where Jacob's father was the IMF resident representative in Monrovia, Liberia. Hemphill and Jefferson then met Ryan Berty (drums), and Ken Brownell (percussion) in middle school and high school.

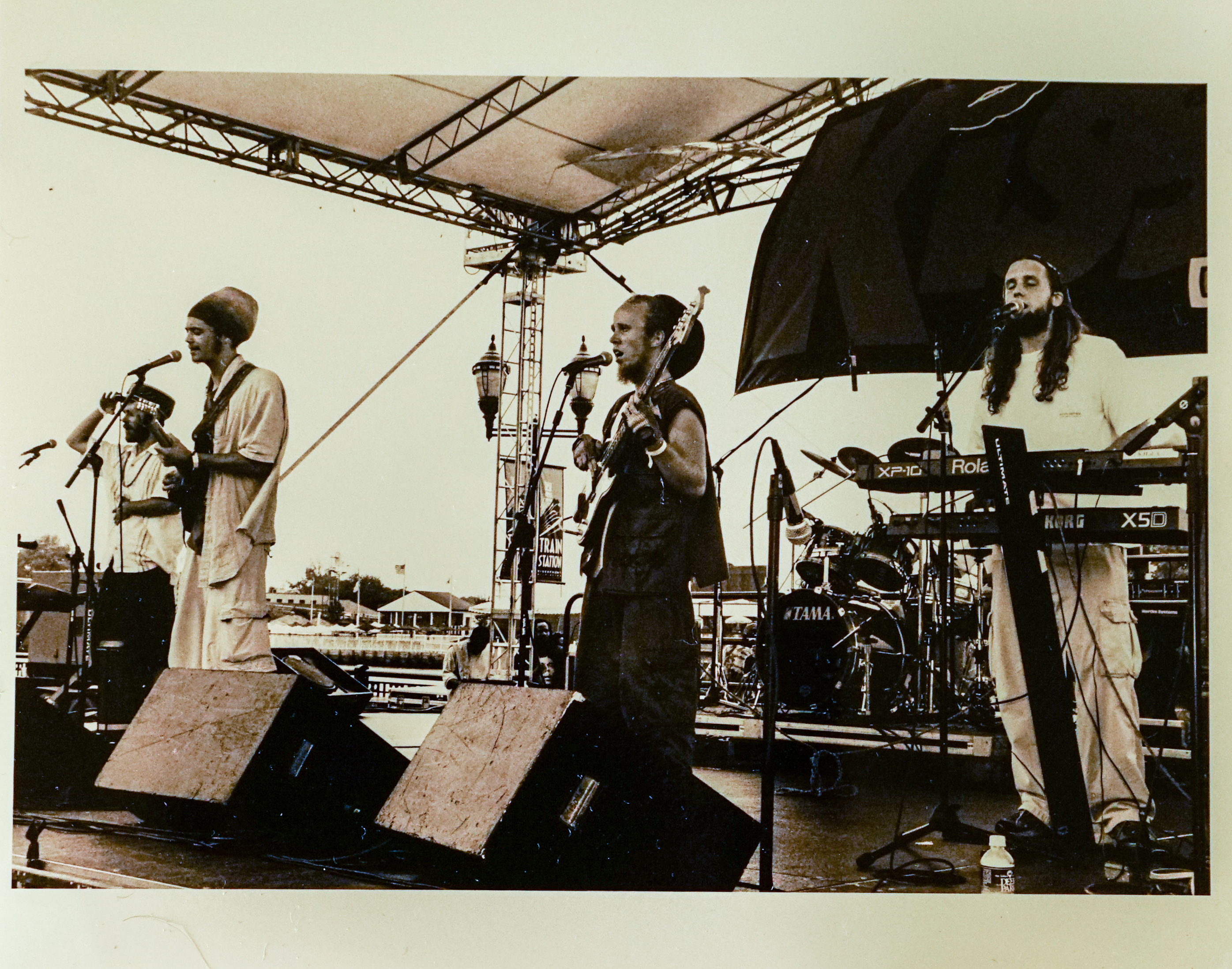
August 2017

Creeping In (1998)

After forming SOJA in 1997, Jacob Hemphill, Bob Jefferson, Ryan "Byrd" Berty and Kenneth Brownell recorded their first album Creeping In in 1998.

SOJA EP (2000)

They released their first EP, self-titled SOJA, independently with sound engineer Jim Fox at LION and FOX Recording Studios in 2000. It was positively received.

Peace in Time of War (2002)

The band also released their first full-length album, Peace in a Time of War in 2002.

SOJA released a dub version of their Peace in a Time of War album titled, Dub in a Time of War in 2005.

=== 2006–2009: Releases with label ===
Get Wiser (2006)

In 2006, the band released Get Wiser, their second full-length album, and their first on the record label Innerloop. It debuted in the Top 10 Reggae Albums on iTunes and has remained in the top 100 since its release. The album release party was held on January 6, 2006 at The State Theatre in Falls Church, Virginia. It consisted of two separate sets, with the opening set being older songs, and the second set being Get Wiser in its entirety. The show was recorded and was released as a DVD, known as the Get Wiser Live DVD, on November 21, 2007.

Stars & Stripes EP (2008)

In January 2008, they released an EP titled, Stars and Stripes. That same month in Hawaii, SOJA recorded their live performances in Oahu, Maui, and Kailua-Kona. Those performances were released as a DVD, known as the SOJA – Live in Hawaii, on January 8, 2009.

=== 2009–2012: Steady album releases ===
The band had released one major album and toured largely in Virginia. A great promotional effort by Nick Yuen in the release of their new live album Live in Virginia.

Born in Babylon (2009)

SOJA released their third full-length album Born in Babylon on August 21, 2009, on DMV Records. It peaked at number 11 on the Top Heatseekers chart, and reached number 38 on the Independent Albums chart. Trevor Young, formerly SOJA's guitar tech, became lead guitar and backup vocals in late 2011.

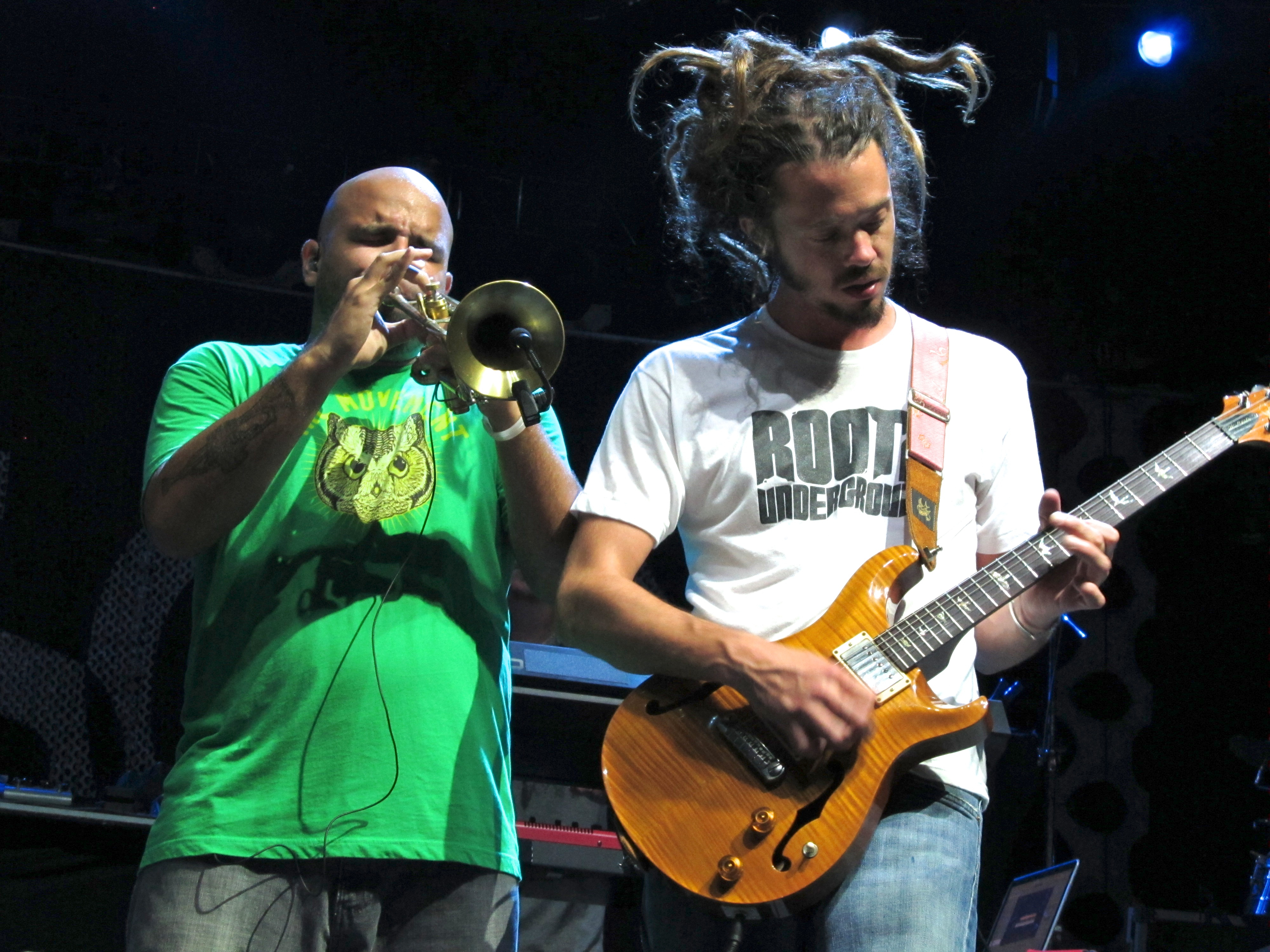
SOJA at Merriweather Post Pavilion in 2011. Rafael Rodriguez (left) and Jacob Hemphill (right)

Strength to Survive (2012)

The band released their fourth album, Strength to Survive on January 31, 2012, their first album on ATO Records. It sold over 50,000 copies, and topped the Billboard Reggae Album Chart in both 2012 and 2013. It was also number 9 for the year end Reggae Albums chart on Billboard, and reached number 36 on the Billboard 200, as well as number 2 on the Independent Albums chart. It received 3.5/5 stars from Allmusic, with the website praising the band's growth as songwriters and Hemphill's vocal developments. While Allmusic criticized the non-reggae acoustic tracks at the end of the album, it stated that overall "You've got one of the best American reggae albums of the year."

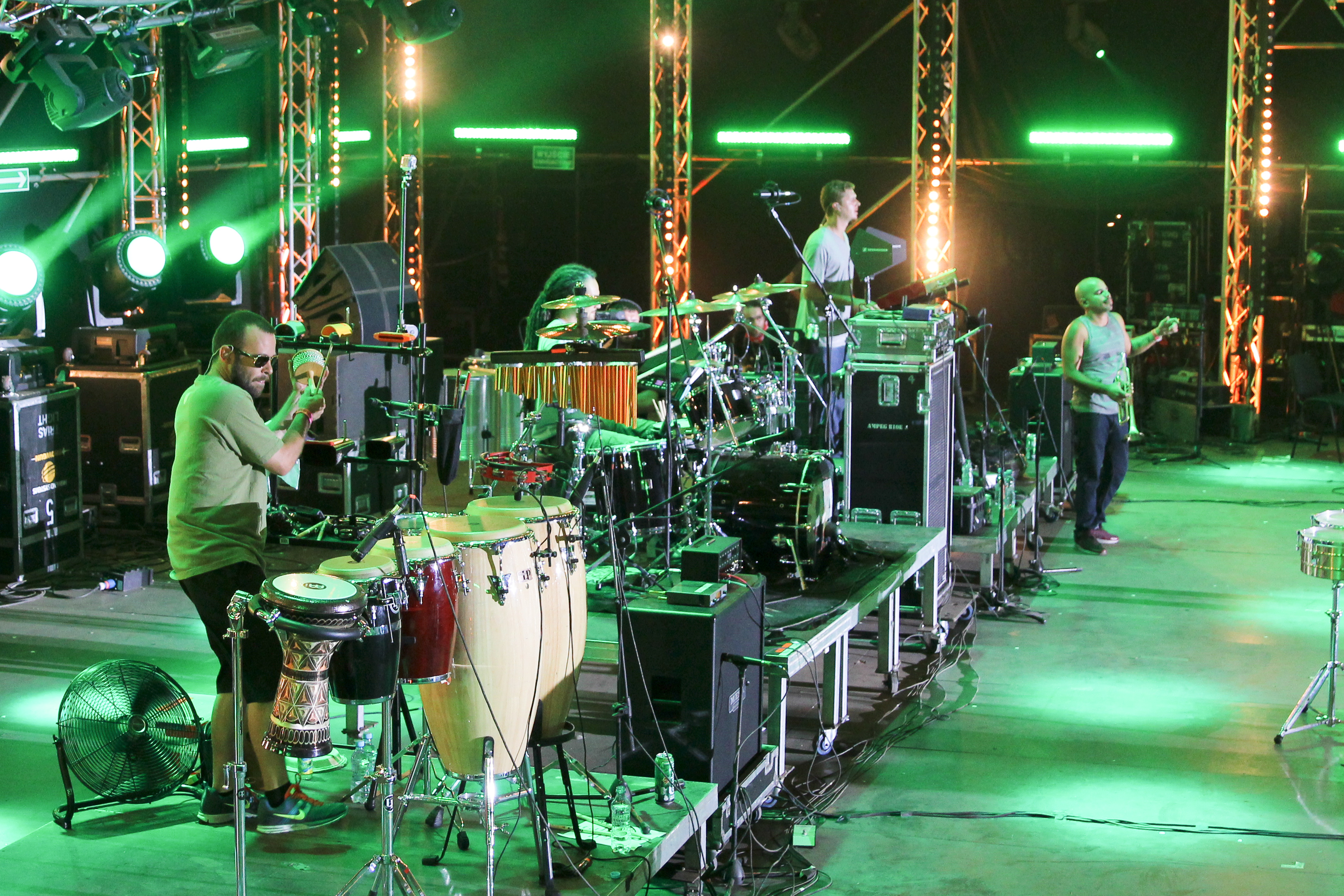
SOJA performing at Przystanek Woodstock 2013

Amid the Noise and Haste (2014)

In 2014, they released their fifth album, Amid the Noise and Haste on ATO Records. Produced by Supa Dups, the album was recorded throughout 2013. Guest artists include Damian Marley, J Boog, Anuhea, and Collie Buddz. Hemphill penned the lyrics, chords, and melodies of the songs. The album topped the Billboard Reggae Albums chart, and received a Grammy nomination in the "Best Reggae Album" category.

Poetry in Motion (2017)

In October 2017, they released their sixth album, Poetry in Motion on the ATO label with the following songs: "Moving Stones", "I Can't Stop Dreaming", "Tried My Best", "More", "Fire in the Sky", "Everything to Me", "Life Support", "Bad News", "To Whom It May Concern", "Sing to Me", and "I Found You".

In 2018, SOJA booked some festivals in the U.S. and toured in Europe in the summer.

=== 2019–present: Recent years ===
On May 22, 2020, SOJA was featured as one of many reggae bands on Collie Buddz riddim album, Cali Roots Riddim 2020 with their single, "A Brief History", which was produced by Collie Buddz and mixed by Stick Figure's touring guitarist, producer Johnny Cosmic.

Beauty in the Silence (2021)

After a three year hiatus, SOJA released their seventh studio album, Beauty In Silence on September 24, 2021. Parts of the album were recorded at Inner Circle's legendary Circle House Studios in Miami, Florida by Niko Marzouca and Rob Marks. It was also recorded at New Jersey's Sterling Sound and Dave Matthews' Haunted Hollow Studio in Charlottesville, Virginia. Featured album guest artists include: Collie Buddz, Dirty Heads, J Boog, Nanpa Basico, Rebelution, Slightly Stoopid, Stick Figure, and UB40.

The album debuted at No. 2 on the Billboard Reggae Albums charts. It also debuted at No. 34 on Billboard's Current Albums Sales chart, and No. 52 on Billboard's Top Album Sales chart. Billboard describes the album as, "Contemporary reggae with a forthright social conscience."

According to SOJA's Facebook page, Beauty in the Silence is being considered for the 64th Annual Grammy Awards for Best Reggae Album. Also, their song "Press Rewind" featuring Collie Buddz and J Boog is being considered for Best Global Music Performance.

In December 2021, SOJA was nominated for the fans-choice "2021 Album of the Year" award by Surf Roots TV & Radio for their album Beauty in the Silence. Voting was determined by Facebook, Instagram and Twitter users. This was the band's first time being nominated with the reggae rock streaming TV channel on Amazon Fire TV, Apple TV, and Roku.

On April 3, 2022, SOJA won their first Grammy Award for Best Reggae Album for 2021's Beauty in the Silence at the 64th Annual Grammy Awards. This was their third nomination since 2015. They also made history for being the first American Reggae-Rock group to win the award.

SOJA was one of the many featured reggae rock artists on Crossed Heart Clothing presents Pop Punk Goes Reggae, Vol. 1, which was produced by frontman Nathan Aurora of Iya Terra. The 16-track album was released on September 15, 2023 by Ineffable Records. The band put their reggae spin on a cover of "Sugar We're Goin Down" by Fall Out Boy.

On July 31, 2026, they released their tenth album, Without Surrender

== Lineup ==
=== Current members ===
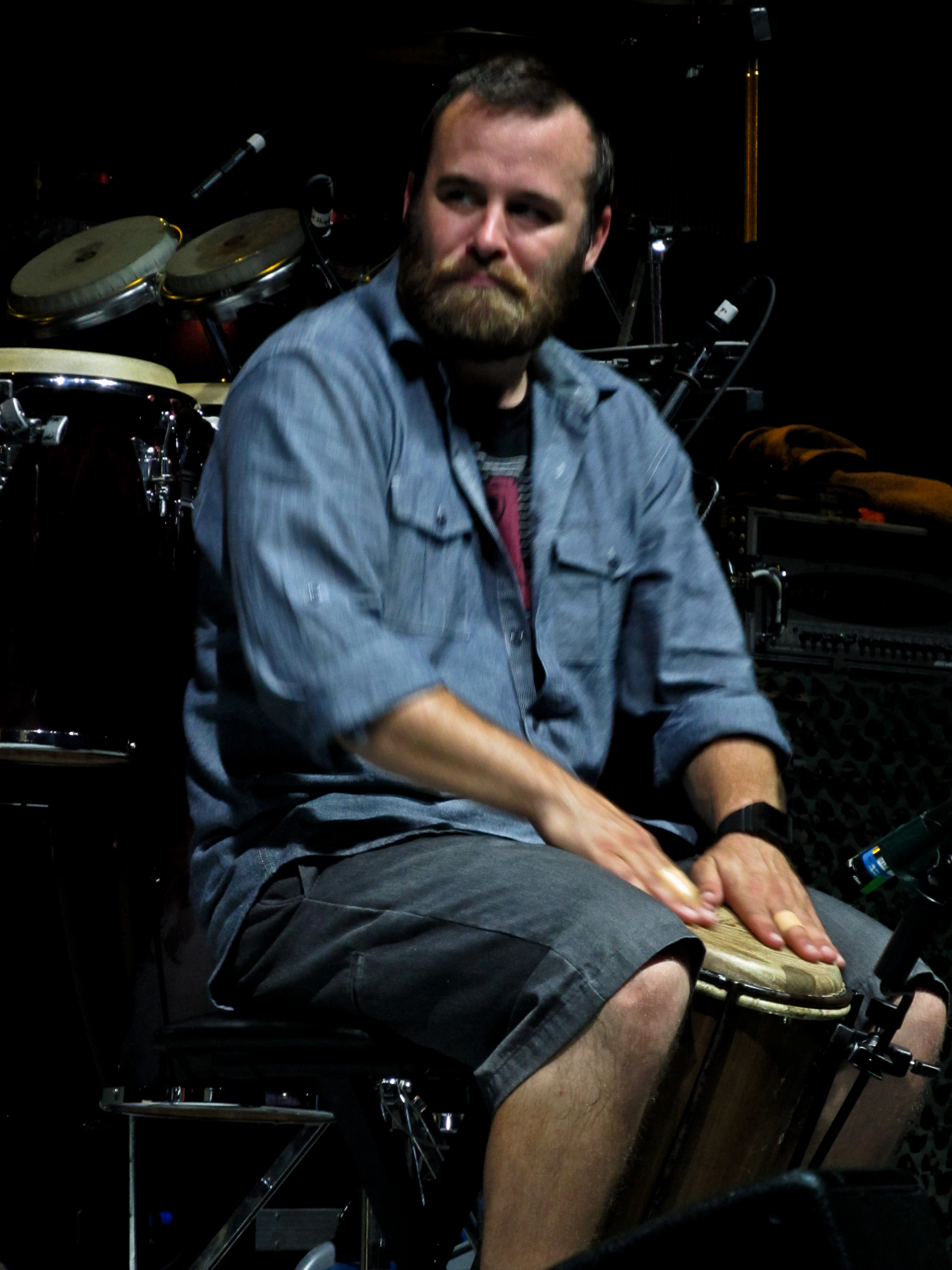
Percussionist Ken Brownell in 2011

- Jacob Hemphill – lead vocals, guitar (1997–present)
- Bobby "Lee" Jefferson – bass guitar, vocals (1997–present)
- Ryan "Bird" Berty – drums (1997–present)
- Ken Brownell – percussion (1997–present)
- Patrick O'Shea – keyboards (2002–present)
- Hellman Escorcia – saxophone (2012–present)
- Rafael Rodriguez – trumpet (2008–present)
- Trevor Young – lead guitar, guest lead vocals (2014–present)

== Discography ==
=== Studio albums ===
Studio albums by SOJA
Year	Album title	Release details	Chart peaks				Certifications
Year	Album title	Release details	US 200	US Regg.	US Heat.	US Ind.	Certifications
1998	Creeping In	Released: 1998; Label: Independent; Format: Cassette	—	—	—	—	
2002	Peace in a Time of War	Released: June 5, 2002; Label: DMV; Format: CD, digital	—	—	—	—	
2004	Dub in a Time of War	Released: January 13, 2004; Label: self-released; Format: CD, digital	—	—	—	—	
2006	Get Wiser	Released: January 24, 2006; Label: Innerloop; Format: CD, digital	—	—	—	—	
2009	Born in Babylon	Released: August 25, 2009; Label: DMV; Format: CD, digital	—	—	11	38	
2012	Strength to Survive	Released: January 31, 2012; Label: ATO; Format: CD, digital	36	1	—	2	No. 1 Reggae Albums both '12, '13; No. 9 Reggae Albums (year end); No. 7 Digital Albums; Sold over 60,000
2014	Amid the Noise and Haste	Released: August 12, 2014; Label: ATO; Format: CD, digital	20	1	—	—	
2017	Poetry in Motion	Released: October 27, 2017; Label: ATO; Format: CD, digital	—	1	—	—	
2021	Beauty in the Silence	Released: September 24, 2021; Label: ATO; Format: CD, digital	—	2	—	—	No. 34 on Billboard's Current Albums Sales; No. 52 on Billboard's Top Album Sales
2026	Without Surrender	Released: July 31, 2026; Label: ATO; Format: CD, digital	—	—	—	—	

=== Live albums ===
Live albums by SOJA
Year	Album title	Release details	Chart peaks
Year	Album title	Release details	US Regg.
2016	SOJA: Live in Virginia	Released: 2016; Label: ATO; Format: digital	1

=== EPs ===
EPs by SOJA
Year	EP title	Release details
2000	SOJA	Released: January 1, 2000; Label: DMV; Format: CD, digital
2008	Stars & Stripes	Released: January 2008; Label: Innerloop; Format: CD, digital

=== Singles ===
List of singles by SOJA
Year	Song title	Album
2009	"I Don't Wanna Wait"	Born in Babylon
2010	"I Tried (Don Corleon Remix)" (feat. Gentleman)	1 track single
2012	"Not Done Yet"	1 track single
2012	"Everything Changes" (feat. O Rappa)	1 track single
2013	"F**k Your System (Jr Blender Mentality RMX)" (feat. J Boog)	1 track single
2013	"She Still Loves Me" (feat. Collie Buddz)	1 track single
2013	"Tell Me" (Jr Blender RMX feat. Richie Campbell)	1 track single
2014	"I Believe" (feat. Michael Franti and Nahko Bear)	1 track single
2014	"Your Song" (feat. Damian Marley)	Promo single/ Amid The Noise and Haste
2017	"Bad News"	Promo single
2017	"More"	Promo single
2021	"Press Rewind" (feat. Collie Buddz & J Boog)	Beauty in the Silence
2021	"The Day You Came" (feat. Rebelution & UB40)	Beauty in the Silence
2021	"Reason to Live" (feat. Dirty Heads & Nanpa Basico)	Beauty in the Silence
2021	"Jump" (feat. Slightly Stoopid)	Beauty in the Silence

=== Songs ===
Title	Release date	Album
"Jah Atmosphere"	2002	Peace in a Time of War
"Rasta Courage"	2002	Peace in a Time of War
"True Love"	2002	Peace in a Time of War
"Open My Eyes"	2006	Get Wiser
"You Don't Know Me"	2006	Get Wiser
"Decide You're Gone"	2009	Born in Babylon
"Here I Am" (feat. Rebelution)	2009	Born in Babylon
"I Don't Wanna Wait"	2009	Born in Babylon
"I Tried" (feat. Gentleman & Tamika)	2009	Born in Babylon
"Losing My Mind"	2009	Born in Babylon
"Summer Breeze"	2009	Born in Babylon
"Used To Matter"	2009	Born in Babylon
"You and Me" (feat. Chris Boomer)	2009	Born in Babylon
"Be With Me Now"	2012	Strength to Survive
"Everything Changes" (feat. Danakil)	2012	Strength to Survive
"Not Done Yet"	2012	Strength to Survive
"Nothing Ever Changes" (feat. Gentleman)	2012	Strength to Survive
"Tell Me"	2012	Strength to Survive
"When We Were Younger"	2012	Strength to Survive
"Easier" (feat. Anuhea & J Boog)	2014	Amid the Noise and Haste
"I Believe" (feat. Michael Franti & Nahko)	2014	Amid the Noise and Haste
"Lucid Dreams" (feat. Nahko)	2014	Amid the Noise and Haste
"Promises and Pills" (feat. Alfred the MC)	2014	Amid the Noise and Haste
"Shadow" (feat. Trevor Young)	2014	Amid the Noise and Haste
"She Still Loves Me" (feat. Collie Buddz)	2014	Amid the Noise and Haste
"Tear It Down"	2014	Amid the Noise and Haste
"Your Song" (feat. Damian "Jr. Gong" Marley)	2014	Amid the Noise and Haste
"Everything To Me"	2017	Poetry in Motion
"I Found You"	2017	Poetry in Motion
"More"	2017	Poetry in Motion
"Moving Stones"	2017	Poetry in Motion
"Tried My Best"	2017	Poetry in Motion
"A Brief History" (feat. Collie Buddz)	May 22, 2020	Cali Roots Riddim 2020 (Single)
"It's Funny" (feat. Common Kings & Eli-Mac)	2021	Beauty in the Silence
"Jump" (feat. Slightly Stoopid)	2021	Beauty in the Silence
"Press Rewind" (feat. Collie Buddz & J Boog)	2021	Beauty in the Silence
"Reason To Live" (feat. Dirty Heads & Nanpa Basico)	2021	Beauty in the Silence
"Something to Believe In" (feat. Stick Figure)	2021	Beauty in the Silence
"The Day You Came" (feat. Rebelution & Alli Campbell of UB40)	2021	Beauty in the Silence
"Things You Can't Control" (feat. Trevor Young)	2021	Beauty in the Silence
"Tis Heart is Mine" (feat. Eric Swanson)	2021	Beauty in the Silence
"Sugar We're Goin Down" (Fall Out Boy Reggae Cover)	August 4, 2023	Pop Punk Goes Reggae, Vol. 1 (Single)

=== DVDs ===
DVDs featuring SOJA
Year	Title	Release details
2006	Get Wiser Live DVD	Released: Jan 6, 2006; Label: Innerloop; Format: DVD
2009	SOJA – Live in Hawaii	Released: Jan 8, 2009; Label: self-released; Format: DVD

=== Production credits ===
Albums produced by SOJA
Yr	Release title	Artist(s)	Notes, role
2008	Syr Mahber - A SOJA Production	Various (Bobby Lee (SOJA), Luciano, Prezident Brown, Zedicus, Queen Ifrica, Ras Attitude, Jacob Hemphill (SOJA), Sister Carol, Ras Abel, Batch, Tony Rebel, Fear Nuttin Band, Don Carmelo (Gomba Jahbari), Jah Dan & Junior Kelly)	Production and track compilation, released Oct 4, 2008

== See also ==
- Reggae
- List of reggae artists
