= Dirty Heads discography =

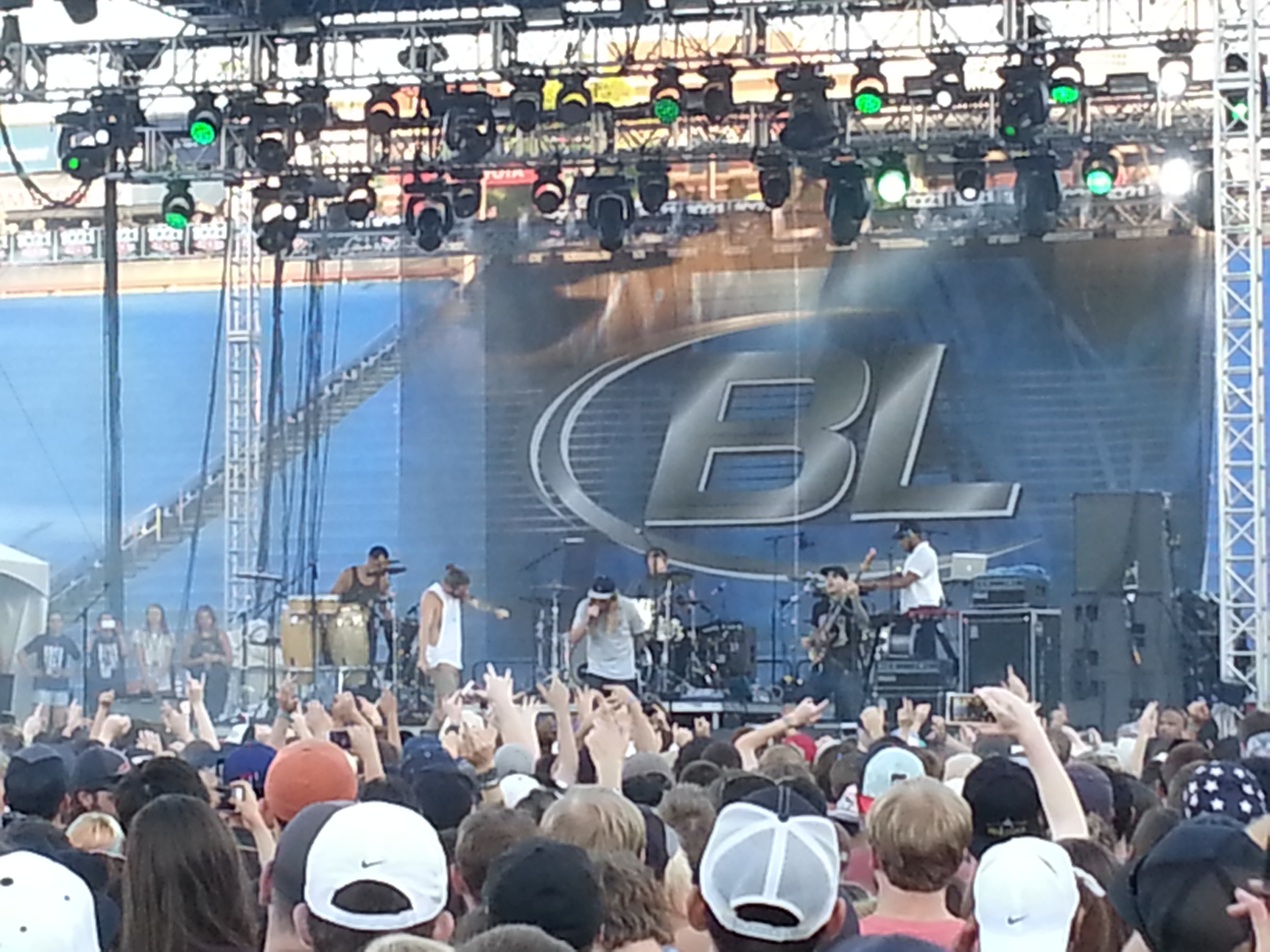
- Studio albums: 8
- Singles: 22
- Demo albums: 2

The discography of American reggae rock band Dirty Heads consists of nine studio albums and twenty-four singles.

== Albums ==
=== Studio albums ===
List of studio albums with selected chart positions
Title	Details	Peak chart positions			
Title	Details	US	US Alt.	US Rock	CAN
Any Port in a Storm	Released: September 23, 2008; Label: Executive; Formats: CD, digital download	55	7	16	—
Cabin by the Sea	Released: June 19, 2012; Label: Five Seven; Formats: CD, vinyl, digital download	18	4	6	—
Home – Phantoms of Summer	Released: October 29, 2013; Label: Five Seven; Formats: CD, vinyl, digital download	27	7	9	—
Sound of Change	Released: July 8, 2014; Label: Five Seven; Formats: CD, vinyl, digital download	8	1	2	—
Dirty Heads	Released: July 15, 2016; Label: Five Seven; Formats: CD, vinyl, digital download	14	2	2	65
Swim Team	Released: October 13, 2017; Label: Five Seven; Formats: CD, vinyl, digital download	35	4	6	—
Super Moon	Released: August 9, 2019; Label: Five Seven; Formats: CD, vinyl, digital download, streaming	116	7	23	—
Midnight Control	Released: August 26, 2022; Label: Better Noise Music; Formats: CD, Cassette tape, Digital download, streaming	—	—	—	—
7 Seas	Released: June 12, 2026; Label: Better Noise Music; Formats: CD, Cassette tape, Digital download, streaming	—	—	—	—

== Singles ==
List of singles, with selected chart positions, showing year released and album name
Title	Year	Peak chart positions									Certifications	Album
Title	Year	US	US AAA	US Adult	US Alt.	US Rock	CAN	CAN Rock	CZ	MEX Air.	Certifications	Album
"Stand Tall"	2008	—	—	—	23	41	—	—	—	—	RIAA: Gold	Any Port in a Storm
"Lay Me Down" (featuring Rome Ramirez)	2010	93	17	37	1	1	76	11	—	—	RIAA: Platinum	Any Port in a Storm
"Check the Level" (featuring M. Shadows and Slash)	2010	—	—	—	—	—	—	—	—	—		Any Port in a Storm
"Believe"	2011	—	—	—	—	—	—	—	—	—		Any Port in a Storm
"Spread Too Thin"	2012	—	22	—	13	22	—	32	—	50		Cabin by the Sea
"Dance All Night" (featuring Matisyahu)	2012	—	—	—	29	—	—	—	—	—	RIAA: Gold	Cabin by the Sea
"Cabin by the Sea"	2013	—	—	—	27	—	—	—	—	—		Cabin by the Sea
"My Sweet Summer"	2014	— (Note: "My Sweet Summer" did not chart on the Billboard Hot 100 but did peak at number 22 on the Bubbling Under Hot 100 Singles chart, which is an extension of the Billboard Hot 100.)	—	—	3	13	—	33	—	—	RIAA: Platinum	Sound of Change
"Sound of Change"	2014	—	—	—	22	— (Note: "Sound of Change" did not chart on the Hot Rock Songs chart but did peak at number 37 on the Rock Airplay chart.)	—	—	—	—		Sound of Change
"End of the World"	2015	—	—	—	—	— (Note: "End of the World" did not chart on the Hot Rock Songs chart but did peak at number 47 on the Rock Digital Songs chart.)	—	—	—	—		Sound of Change
"That's All I Need"	2016	—	—	—	16	32	—	46	—	—		Dirty Heads
"Too Cruel"	2016	—	—	—	—	—	—	—	—	—		Dirty Heads
"Oxygen"	2016	—	—	—	25	— (Note: "Oxygen" did not chart on the Hot Rock Songs chart but did peak at number 44 on the Rock Airplay chart.)	—	—	—	—	RIAA: Gold	Dirty Heads
"Vacation" (solo or featuring Train)	2017	—	—	—	14	20	—	—	—	—	RIAA: Platinum; MC: Gold	Swim Team
"Celebrate" (featuring The Unlikely Candidates)	2017	—	—	—	12	31	—	—	—	—		Swim Team
"Visions" (solo or featuring Chloe Chaidez)	2018	—	—	—	19	42	—	—	—	—		Swim Team
"Listen to Me"	2018	—	—	—	—	—	—	—	—	—		Non-album single
"Super Moon"	2019	—	—	—	—	—	—	—	—	—		Super Moon
"Lift Me Up"	2019	—	—	—	—	—	—	—	—	—		Super Moon
"Fear & Love"	2019	—	—	—	—	—	—	—	—	—		Super Moon
"Bum Bum" (featuring Villain Park)	2020	—	—	—	—	—	—	—	—	—		Non-album singles
"Earthquake Weather"	2020	—	—	—	—	—	—	—	—	—		Non-album singles
"Rage" (featuring Aimee Interrupter and Travis Barker)	2021	—	—	—	26	—	—	32	—	—		The Best of Dirty Heads
"Life's Been Good"	2022	—	—	—	3	48	—	—	—	—		Midnight Control
"Heavy Water" (featuring Common Kings)	2022	—	—	—	—	—	—	—	—	—		Midnight Control
"Rescue Me"	2023	—	—	—	1	—	—	—	57	—		Midnight Control Sessions: Night 2
"Slow & Easy" (with Rome)	2025	—	—	—	12	—	—	—	—	—		Non-album single
"Seven Seas"	2026	—	—	—	—	—	—	—	—	—		7 Seas
"One Of Those Days"	2026	—	—	—	2	—	—	—	—	—		7 Seas
"—" denotes a recording that did not chart or was not released in that territory.
