= List of artists who reached number one on the U.S. alternative rock chart =

This is a list of recording artists who have reached number one on Billboard magazine's Alternative Songs chart. Billboard began ranking the chart on the week ending September 10, 1988 (as Modern Rock Tracks), and this is the standard music popularity chart in the United States for play on modern rock radio.

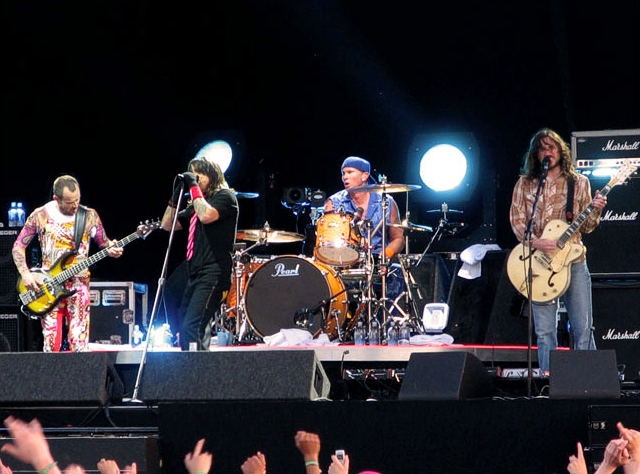
With a total of 15 songs, Red Hot Chili Peppers hold the record for the most number-ones songs.

The list follows the following principles:

- All acts are listed alphabetically.
- Solo artists are alphabetized by last name, groups by group name, excluding "a", "an" and "the".
- Each act's total of number-one U.S. alternative rock hits is shown after their name.
- All artists who are mentioned in song credits are listed here; this includes one-time pairings of otherwise solo artists and those appearing as "featured".
- Artists associated with a group who reached number one yet have their own solo page in Wikipedia are not listed here, unless they hit number one as a solo artist.

== 0–9 ==
- 3 Doors Down (1)
- 10 Years (1)
- 10,000 Maniacs (1)
- 311 (2)

== A ==
- Absofacto (1)
- AFI (1)
- AJR (1)
- Alice in Chains (1)
- Alien Ant Farm (1)
- All Time Low (3)
- Almost Monday (1)
- Tori Amos (1)
- Anberlin (1)
- Arctic Monkeys (1)
- Audioslave (2)
- Awolnation (1)

== B ==
- The B-52's (3)
- Bad Omens (1)
- Balu Brigada (1)
- Barenaked Ladies (1)
- Bastille (2)
- Beach Weather (1)
- Beastie Boys (1)
- Beck (3)
- Belly (1)
- Better Than Ezra (1)
- Big Audio Dynamite/Big Audio Dynamite II (2)
- Big Data (1)
- Blackbear (2)
- The Black Keys (8)
- Bleachers (1)
- Blind Melon (1)
- Blink-182 (5)
- Bob Moses (1)
- Tracy Bonham (1)
- BoyWithUke (1)
- Bush (5)
- Kate Bush (1)
- Butthole Surfers (1)

== C ==
- Cage the Elephant (14)
- Cake (1)
- Camper Van Beethoven (1)
- Cannons (1)
- Capital Cities (1)
- The Charlatans (1)
- Chevelle (1)
- Chumbawamba (1)
- The Church (1)
- Alex Clare (1)
- Cold War Kids (1)
- Coldplay (4)
- Concrete Blonde (1)
- Julian Cope (1)
- Elvis Costello (2)
- Counting Crows (1)
- Cracker (1)
- The Cranberries (2)
- Crash Kings (1)
- Crash Test Dummies (1)
- Crazy Town (1)
- Creed (1)
- Rivers Cuomo (1)
- The Cure (4)

== D ==
- David J (1)
- Death Cab for Cutie (2)
- Depeche Mode (4)
- Dexter and the Moonrocks (2)

- Dirty Heads (2)
- Djo (1)
- Dishwalla (1)

== E ==
- Edgehill (1)
- Eels (1)
- Billie Eilish (4)
- Electronic (1)
- Evanescence (1)
- Eve 6 (1)
- Everclear (1)
- Everlast (1)

== F ==
- Faith No More (1)
- Fall Out Boy (1)
- Fastball (1)
- Dominic Fike (2)
- Finger Eleven (1)
- Fitz and the Tantrums (2)
- Foals (1)
- Foo Fighters (12)
- Foster the People (1)
- Fuel (1)
- Fun (2)

== G ==
- Peter Gabriel (2)
- Garbage (1)
- Gene Loves Jezebel (1)
- Gin Blossoms (1)
- Glass Animals (1)
- Good Charlotte (1)
- Goo Goo Dolls (3)
- Gorillaz (1)
- Gotye (1)
- Green Day (13)
- Grouplove (1)

== H–I ==
- Happy Mondays (1)
- The Juliana Hatfield Three (1)
- The Head and the Heart (3)
- Robyn Hitchcock (1)
- Hole (1)
- Hoobastank (1)
- Hoodoo Gurus (1)
- Hozier (1)
- I Dont Know How but They Found Me (1)
- Imagine Dragons (7)
- Incubus (4)
- INXS (1)

== J ==
- Jane's Addiction (3)
- The Jesus and Mary Chain (1)
- Jesus Jones (2)
- Jet (1)
- JID (1)
- Jimmy Eat World (2)
- Vance Joy (1)
- Joywave (1)
- Judah & the Lion (1)
- Justice (1)

== K ==
- Jonah Kagen (1)
- Noah Kahan (2)
- Kaleo (1)
- The Killers (3)
- Kimbra (1)
- Elle King (1)
- Kings of Leon (5)
- Kongos (1)
- Lenny Kravitz (1)
- Chad Kroeger (1)

== L ==
- The Lemonheads (1)
- Lifehouse (1)
- Limp Bizkit (1)
- Linkin Park (14)
- Lit (1)
- Live (3)
- Lorde (1)
- Lostprophets (1)
- Love and Rockets (1)
- Lovelytheband (1)
- The Lumineers (6)

== M ==
- Machine Gun Kelly (1)
- Post Malone (1)
- Måneskin (2)
- Matt Maeson (3)
- Marcy Playground (1)
- Marshmello (1)
- Matchbox Twenty (1)
- Ian McCulloch (1)
- Alice Merton (1)
- Midnight Oil (2)
- The Mighty Mighty Bosstones (1)
- Milky Chance (1)
- Modest Mouse (3)
- Janelle Monáe (1)
- Alanis Morissette (3)
- Morrissey (2)
- Mumford & Sons (5)
- Peter Murphy (1)
- Muse (5)
- My Chemical Romance (1)
- Meg Myers (1)

== N ==
- Ned's Atomic Dustbin (1)
- The Neighbourhood (1)
- Neon Trees (1)
- New Order (1)
- Nickelback (1)
- Nine Inch Nails (4)
- Nirvana (5)
- Nothing But Thieves (1)

== O ==
- Oasis (2)
- Sinéad O'Connor (2)
- Of Monsters and Men (1)
- The Offspring (3)

== P ==
- Panic! at the Disco (3)
- Papa Roach (1)
- The Paradox (1)
- Paramore (1)
- Pearl Jam (4)
- A Perfect Circle (1)
- Phoenix (1)
- Pierce the Veil (2)
- P.O.D. (1)
- Porno for Pyros (1)
- Portugal. The Man (2)
- The Presidents of the United States of America (1)
- Primitive Radio Gods (1)
- The Psychedelic Furs (3)
- Public Image Ltd. (1)
- Puddle of Mudd (2)

== Q–R ==
- Queens of the Stone Age (1)
- The Raconteurs (1)
- Rag'n'Bone Man (1)
- The Railway Children (1)
- The Revivalists (1)
- Lana Del Rey (1)
- Rome Ramirez (1)
- Red Hot Chili Peppers (15)
- Lou Reed (2)
- R.E.M. (6)
- The Replacements (2)

== S ==
- Saliva (1)
- Josey Scott (1)
- Seether (2)
- Semisonic (1)
- Shaed (1)
- Shinedown (1)
- Silverchair (1)
- Silversun Pickups (1)
- Simple Minds (1)
- Siouxsie and the Banshees (2)
- The Sisters of Mercy (1)
- Smash Mouth (1)
- The Smashing Pumpkins (1)
- Myles Smith (1)
- Sombr (1)
- Soul Asylum (2)
- Staind (3)
- Sting (1)
- Stone Temple Pilots (1)
- The Strumbellas (1)
- Sub Urban (1)
- Sublime (3)
- Sugar Ray (2)
- The Sugarcubes (1)
- Sum 41 (3)
- The Sundays (1)
- System of a Down (2)

== T ==
- Talking Heads (1)
- Tame Impala (2)
- Tears for Fears (2)
- Temper City (1)
- Third Eye Blind (1)
- Thirty Seconds to Mars (3)
- Three Days Grace (3)
- Toad the Wet Sprocket (1)
- Trapt (1)
- Turnstile (1)
- Twenty One Pilots (14)
- Two Feet (1)

== U–Z ==
- U2 (8)
- The Unlikely Candidates (1)
- Unwritten Law (1)
- Suzanne Vega (1)
- Velvet Revolver (1)
- The Verve Pipe (1)
- Walk the Moon (2)
- The Wallflowers (1)
- Wednesday (1)
- Weezer (9)
- White Reaper (1)
- Jack White (1)
- The White Stripes (2)
- World Party (1)
- X Ambassadors (1)
- XTC (2)
- Yellowcard (2)
- Lola Young (1)
- Young the Giant (1)
- Yungblud (1)

== See also ==
- List of number-one modern rock hits (United States)
