= List of reggae rock artists =

The following is a list of reggae rock artists. Reggae rock is a subgenre of reggae fusion that primarily uses the genres reggae, rock and ska.

== Artists ==
- 311
- Ballyhoo!
- Bedouin Soundclash
- Big Mountain
- Big Sugar
- Tessanne Chin
- Cui Jian
- Dag Vag
- Dirty Heads
- Dread Zeppelin
- Echo Movement
- The Expendables
- Eddy Grant
- IllScarlett
- Iration
- Lionize
- Magic!
- Matisyahu
- Men at Work
- The Movement
- No Fixed Address
- Os Paralamas do Sucesso (a.k.a. Paralamas)
- Passafire
- Pepper
- The Police
- Natty Nation
- Rebelution
- Skank
- Skindred
- Slightly Stoopid
- SOJA
- State Radio
- Sublime
- Subrosa Union
- Tomorrows Bad Seeds
- Tribal Seeds
- Us Mob
- Bart Willoughby
