= Vacation (Dirty Heads song) =

2017 single by the Dirty Heads

Single by Dirty Heads

from the album Swim Team
- Released: June 30, 2017
- Genre: Reggae; rock music; alternative rock
- Length: 3:27
- Label: Five Seven Music
- Songwriters: Jonas Jeberg; Jared Watson
- Producer: Jonas Jeberg

Dirty Heads singles chronology
"Oxygen" (2016)	"Vacation" (2017)	"Celebrate" (2017)

Music video
- "Vacation" on YouTube

"Vacation" is a song by American reggae rock band Dirty Heads, from their fourth studio album Swim Team (2017). The song was released through Five Seven Music on June 30, 2017, as the album's first single. It is a reggae-rock track, which lyrically addresses the need to enjoy life and live your dreams. It was written by Jonas Jeberg and Jared Watson, band founder.

"Vacation" received acclaim after its release. The song spiked in popularity during 2021, thanks to tiktoks featuring the song, and later spread to YouTube through a 'steak meme'. The song earned Recording Industry Association of America platinum certification on June 14, 2023, and Music Canada gold certification on May 25, 2021.

The music video was directed by Wayne Isham and Ryan Ewing, and features Dennis Haskins from Saved By The Bell! as the featured character. It depicts Haskins portraying a principal lip-syncing and dancing through an empty High School. The song has been performed on many occasions like at the Oceans Calling festival, at Key West, Point Lounge, and the Rolling Stone Office. The popularity of "Vacation" inspired Dirty Heads to make a version of the song featuring American rock band Train.

== Development ==
Watson got the idea for the song while walking his dogs and contemplating the life he'd built with the band.

In the video, the Dirty Heads wanted Haskins to show a different personality, but that did not happen. "We wanted to get him to do way more debauchery in the video but he can't, like he legally can't because he's still Mr. Belding and does appearances and stuff," Watson told Ic3y.

Before the Swim Team's album release, on June 26, 2017, a Facebook post titled "Coming Friday" was published where they revealed a snippet of the song along with a snippet of the lyric video. The post was received, and other popular Facebook accounts commented on it, such as the official account of Distractify.

== Lyrics and composition ==
The song expresses the importance of having a free, happy life. "As long as you're doing what you love, you can't ask for more," Watson explained in a 2017 radio interview. "If you aren't in that spot, nothing is holding you back from changing that and going and making that happen. And we're proof of that."

"Vacation" is an exuberant song in the key of D♭ lydian, and with a tempo of 150. It is defined as a reggae, rock, and alternative rock track by the Dirty Heads.

== Critical reception ==
"Vacation" received acclaim from fans. The band recorded a second version with Train in 2021. The accompanying music video featured performance footage spliced with TikTok clips. Train's Pat Monahan was eager to jump on the opportunity, saying, "My whole family has loved this song since it came out. Getting a chance to sing on it was cool for all of us, and I think it made me a much cooler human."

External videos
- Dirty Heads - Vacation feat. Train (Official Music Video)
- https://www.youtube.com/watch?v=OBIMlhoIxW0

Earlier in May 2021, Watson reflected on the song's viral success. "It's such a crazy time to be a musician, and a lot of people hate social media and streaming and things like that. I think most people are getting used to it now, but I love it. I love the fact that it's giving all the power back to the fans and giving the power back to the people. Not even giving it back to them! Just giving it to them finally." he said. "It's giving opportunities for musicians to blow up just because you write good music and somebody found it, and it became popular because it was a good song. Like it's not up to program directors anymore. It's not up to labels dumping a bunch of money into one song from one artist and like controlling the industry, forcing you to do radio shows, and forcing you to do this and that or they won't play your song."

The song went viral on TikTok in 2021 thanks to the "Vacation Challenge" which had users sneezing their way into a vacation with the song playing in the background. Watson picked up on the #vacationtransition trend in February 2021 in a clip of him sneezing into his arm and transporting onstage to performing the tune. The challenge garnered over a billion views on TikTok.

== Certifications ==
Region	Certification	Certified units/sales
Canada (Music Canada)	Gold	40,000^{‡}
United States (RIAA)	Platinum	1,000,000^{‡}
^{‡} Sales+streaming figures based on certification alone.
