= Aja Volkman =

American singer (b. 1980)

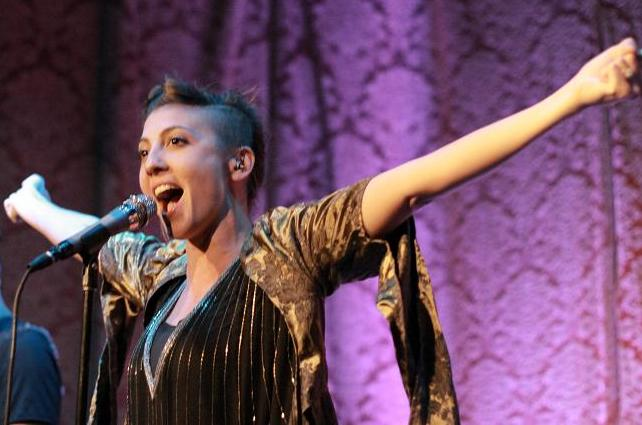
- Volkman with Nico Vega in 2011

Background information
- Born: March 4, 1980 (age 46)
- Origin: Eugene, Oregon, U.S.
- Genres: Alternative rock; indie rock
- Occupations: Singer; songwriter
- Years active: 2005–present
- Label: Five Seven Music
- Member of: Nico Vega
- Formerly of: Egyptian
- Spouse: Dan Reynolds (m. 2011; div. 2024)
- Website: nicovega.com

Aja Volkman (/ˈeɪʒə/; born March 4, 1980) is an American singer and songwriter, best known as the frontwoman of the indie rock band Nico Vega. She has also released an EP titled Egyptian as a duo with her then-husband Dan Reynolds (of Imagine Dragons) under the pseudonym Egyptian.

== Personal life ==
Volkman is the daughter of James Volkman and artist Rogene Manas. She attended South Eugene High School where she graduated in 1998. She was married to the lead singer of Imagine Dragons, Dan Reynolds, on March 5, 2011. They have three daughters and a son. Their oldest daughter was born August 2012, fraternal twin girls in March 2017, and their son in October 2019. On April 26, 2018, Reynolds announced that he and Volkman would divorce after 7 years of marriage. Volkman confirmed the pending divorce the following day. However, on November 6, 2018, along with the release of the Imagine Dragons song "Bad Liar", Reynolds announced that he and Volkman were dating once again and that she helped co-write the song with him earlier in the year. After four more years together, they announced that they had separated once again on September 16, 2022. Volkman filed for divorce the following April, which was then finalized in March 2024.

== Career ==
=== Nico Vega (2005–present) ===
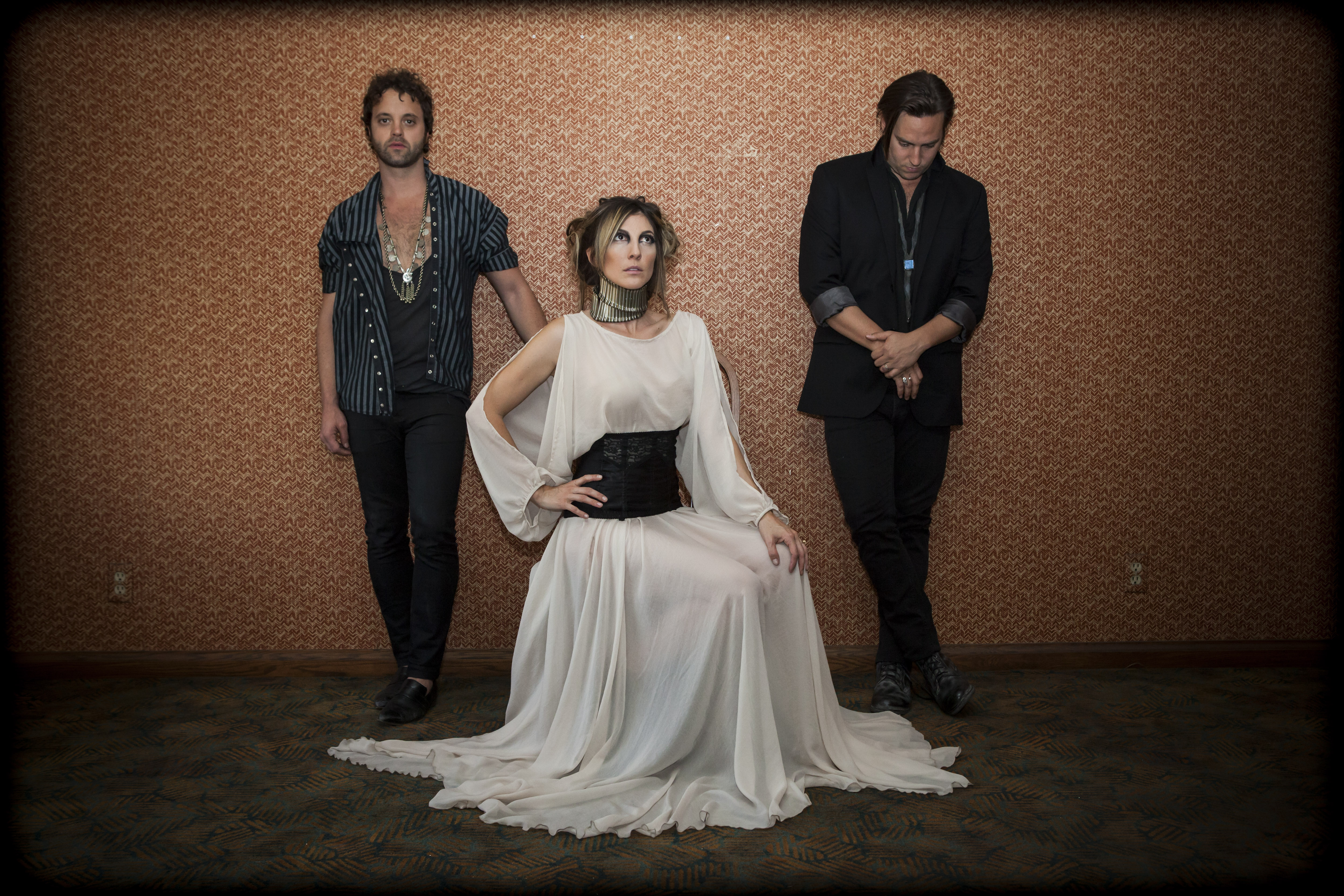
Aja Volkman with Nico Vega

Volkman was approached by Michael Peña after a solo performance in 2005. Although Peña later left the band to pursue acting, Dan Epand (drummer) joined and this formed the basic structure of Nico Vega in 2007. The band released a series of EPs. They signed to now defunct MySpace Records. Two years later the band released their debut eponymous album. Three tracks off of the album were produced by Linda Perry (Pink, Christina Aguilera, Gwen Stefani) and the rest were produced by Tim Edgar. The album was mixed by Tchad Blake (The Black Keys, Sheryl Crow). Nico Vega performed on Last Call with Carson Daly later that year and then toured for the next couple years. They toured extensively with artists including Gavin Rossdale (of Bush), Manic Street Preachers, Imagine Dragons, She Wants Revenge, and Blondie. They have also opened for No Doubt. During this time the band signed to Five Seven Music. Their single "Beast" gained popularity in 2013 through BioShock Infinite advertisements, resulting in more than five million combined downloads and streams.

Their second album, Lead to Light, was released on July 22, 2014, and featured production from Dan Reynolds (Imagine Dragons, X Ambassadors), Tony Hoffer (Beck, Fitz and the Tantrums), and Tim Edgar (Nico Vega). Their single "I Believe (Get Over Yourself)" was co-written by Volkman's husband, Reynolds. Track "Lightning" was co-written with Adam Bravin and Justin Warfield of rock group She Wants Revenge.

Aja Volkman and Dan Epand created a new band, named TWWO, and put out an EP, "Pull The Knife Out", in July 2020.

=== Egyptian (2010–2011) ===
Invited to perform an opening set for Nico Vega, Reynolds met Volkman in 2010. He invited her to help him finish some demos he was working on. The two began a collaborative process which they titled Egyptian. They recorded and released independently a four track eponymous EP digitally.

They have performed this material once at the M Resort in Las Vegas.

=== Solo career (2015–present) ===
In 2015, Reynolds mentioned that Volkman is working on a solo project. Album Sandy was released on May 19, 2017, and featured lead single "My Man". The album features production by Joshua James and producer Tim Edgar (Nico Vega, Imagine Dragons).

== Discography ==
=== Nico Vega ===
- Nico Vega (2009)
- Lead to Light (2014)

=== Egyptian ===
- Egyptian EP (2011)

=== TWWO ===
- Pull the Knife Out EP (2020)

=== Solo ===
- Sandy (2017)

=== Other appearances ===
- "Our Demons feat. Aja Volkman" – The Glitch Mob (2014)
- "I Need My Memory Back feat. Aja Volkman" – The Glitch Mob (2014)
