= Dirty Heads (album) =

Studio album by Dirty Heads
- Released: July 15, 2016
- Genres: Reggae rock; alternative rock; rap rock; alternative hip hop
- Length: 40:34
- Label: Five Seven
- Producers: Dirty Heads; Justin Gray; Jonas Jeberg; Jimmy Harry; David Kahne; Rome Ramirez; Ryan Ogren; Da Internz; Drew Pearson; Danny Mercer

Dirty Heads chronology
Sound of Change (2014)	Dirty Heads (2016)	Swim Team (2017)

Singles from Dirty Heads
- 1. "That's All I Need" Released: April 20, 2016

Dirty Heads is the fifth studio album by reggae/rock/rap hybrid band the Dirty Heads. The album was released on July 15, 2016.

== Track listing ==
All tracks written and produced by the Dirty Heads, with additional writers and producers listed below.

No.	Title	Writer(s)	Producer(s)	Length
1.	"That's All I Need"	Justin Gray	Justin Gray	3:33
2.	"The Truth"	Jonas Jeberg	Jonas Jeberg	3:25
3.	"Doesn't Make You Right"	Jimmy Harry	Jimmy Harry	4:22
4.	"Feeling Good"	Andreas Ramirez; David Kahne	David Kahne	3:21
5.	"Under the Water"	Rome Ramirez	Rome Ramirez	3:24
6.	"Too Cruel"	Rome Ramirez	Rome Ramirez	4:04
7.	"Oxygen"	Ryan Ogren; Nick Bailey	Ryan Ogren	3:45
8.	"Red Lights"	Jonas Jeberg	Jonas Jeberg	3:33
9.	"Smoke & Dream"	Ernest Clark; Marcos Palacios; Mark Pelli; Tony Russell	Da Internz	3:27
10.	"Moon Tower"	Drew Pearson	Drew Pearson	3:56
11.	"Realize It"	Danny Mercer	Danny Mercer	3:44
Total length:				40:34

== Personnel ==
Dirty Heads

- Dustin "Duddy B" Bushnell – lead vocals, guitar
- Jared "Dirty J" Watson – lead vocals
- David Foral – bass guitar
- Jon Olazabal – percussion
- Matt Ochoa – drums

Additional musicians/vocalists

- Lucas Bakker
- Deanna DellaCloppa
- Andrew Gelb
- Daniel Delacruz
- Jud Nester
- Jennifer Karr
- Sharlotte Gibson
- Winston Byrd

Technical personnel

- Mike "Cheez" Brown – executive producer
- Sean Kellett – engineer
- Cody Acosta – additional engineering
- Brian Malouf – mixing
- David Kahne – mixing
- Jimmy Harry – mixing
- Niko Marzouca – mixing
- Robert Marks – mixing
- Chris Gehringer – mastering

== Charts ==
Chart (2016)	Peak position
US Billboard 200	14
US Top Alternative Albums (Billboard)	2
US Independent Albums (Billboard)	1
US Top Rock Albums (Billboard)	2
US Indie Store Album Sales (Billboard)	6
US Vinyl Albums (Billboard)	7
