= Any Port in a Storm =

Studio album by the Dirty Heads
- Released: September 23, 2008
- Recorded: 2007–2008
- Genres: Reggae; rock; rap rock
- Length: 44:46
- Label: EMG

The Dirty Heads chronology
Any Port in a Storm (2008)	Cabin by the Sea (2012)

Singles from Any Port in a Storm
- 1. "Stand Tall" Released: September 16, 2008; 2. "Check the Level" Released: January 10, 2010; 3. "Lay Me Down" Released: March 23, 2010; 4. "Believe" Released: July 26, 2011

Any Port in a Storm is the debut studio album by American reggae rock band the Dirty Heads. It was released on September 23, 2008, through Executive Music Group (EMG). The album was initially set to be released on Warner Bros. Records until the label and band mutually separated. The Dirty Heads, having kept the master recordings, later released the album through EMG, a division of Universal Music Group. The album was mixed by Mario C, best known for his work with the Beastie Boys. The lead single, "Stand Tall", was also featured in the 2007 film Surf's Up before the album came out.

Any Port in a Storm was re-issued in 2010 with a few bonus tracks, including "Lay Me Down", which features Rome Ramirez of Sublime with Rome. "Lay Me Down" was later released as a single and became the band's first hit song, reaching the number one spot on the Billboard Alternative Songs chart in May of that year. Nine weeks later it established a record as the song with the longest stint atop the chart for an independently released title, surpassing the previous mark set in 1999 by Everlast's "What It's Like". The song peaked at number 93 on the U.S. Hot 100 and number 76 on the Canadian Hot 100 chart.

Billy Preston plays keyboards on multiple tracks on the album, in what would be one of the final sessions he recorded before his death.

== Reception ==
Any Port in a Storm received generally mixed reviews from music critics. Writing for AllMusic, Ritchie Unterberger said the band "comfortably combine hip-hop and reggae with somewhat lesser dollops of conventional rock songwriting and arrangements" on the album. Dan Raper of PopMatters called it a "scattershot debut" and remarked that the Dirty Heads' "simplistic rhyme schemes and disconcerting use of the F-bomb ... quickly demonstrate there are leagues between this dick-hop and the intelligent, twisted witticisms of Why?"

== Track listing ==
All tracks are written by The Dirty Heads, Steve Fox and Stan Frazier, except where noted.

No.	Title	Writer(s)	Length
1.	"Neighborhood"	The Dirty Heads, Fox, Frazier, Howard Barrett, John Kenneth Holt, Tyrone Evans	2:50
2.	"Stand Tall"		3:09
3.	"Shine"	The Dirty Heads, Lewis Richards	3:00
4.	"Driftin'"		3:26
5.	"Taint"		3:12
6.	"Morning Light"		2:34
7.	"Insomnia"		3:46
8.	"Easy"		3:17
9.	"Knows That I"		3:34
10.	"Chelsea"		3:08
11.	"Check the Level"	The Dirty Heads, Fox, Frazier, Richards	3:41
12.	"Believe"	The Dirty Heads, Lewis Richards	3:23
13.	"Hip Hop Misfits"		2:39
14.	"Everything I'm Looking For"		3:07

Special Edition
No.	Title	Writer(s)	Length
15.	"Stand Tall" (Acoustic)		3:09
16.	"Viva la Vida (Acoustic)" (Coldplay cover)	Guy Berryman, Jonny Buckland, Will Champion, Chris Martin	2:04
17.	"Sails to the Wind"	The Dirty Heads	3:27
18.	"Headphones"	The Dirty Heads, Fox, Frazier, Richards	2:49
19.	"Lonely One"	The Dirty Heads, Richards	3:40
20.	"Lay Me Down" (featuring Rome Ramirez)	The Dirty Heads, Rome Ramirez	3:34
21.	"Antelope"	The Dirty Heads	3:28
22.	"Rains It Pours"	The Dirty Heads, Richards	3:19
23.	"I Got No Time"		3:59
24.	"Stand Tall (Video)"

== Personnel ==
All credits are adapted from Any Port in a Storm's liner notes.

The Dirty Heads

- Dustin Bushnell − vocals, guitar
- Jared Watson − vocals
- John Olazabal − percussion
- Matt Ochoa − drums (credited but does not perform)
- David Foral − bass (credited on re-issue)

Additional musicians

- Steve Fox − bass (all tracks); guitar, ukulele, clavinet, programming
- Stan Frazier − background vocals, drums, acoustic guitar, programming
- Lewis Richards − programming, clavinet, Rhodes, programming, programming, Wurlitzer, synth bass
- Josh Freese − drums
- Alex Acuña − percussion
- Steve Doze − scratches and programming
- Tramale Chatman − scratches
- Barrie Lee Hall Jr. − trumpet
- Teena Jones − additional guitar (track 10)
- Tippa Irie − additional guitar (track 10)
- Cheez − additional guitar (track 10)
- Native Wayne − background vocals
- Luann Aronson − background vocals
- Mario C − vibraphone
- Billy Preston − organ
- Rome Ramirez − vocals (track 20 on reissue)
- Brett Nicholas − (track 20 on reissue)

Production

- Stan Frazier − production
- Steve Fox − production
- Mario C − mixing
- Lewis Richards − engineering
- Viet Pham − 2nd engineer
- Ed Cherney − additional engineering
- Nate Kunkel − additional engineering
- Patrick Mundy − additional engineering
- Big Bass Brian − mastering
- Bernie Grundman − mastering
- Mike "Cheez" Brown − management

== Charts ==
Chart (2010)	Peak position
US Billboard 200	55
US Top Alternative Albums (Billboard)	7
US Top Rock Albums (Billboard)	16

== See also ==
- List of Billboard number-one alternative singles of the 2010s
