= Sound of Change =

Studio album by Dirty Heads
- Released: July 8, 2014
- Length: 39:45; 46:57 (with Bonus Tracks)
- Label: Five Seven
- Producers: Rome Ramirez; The Cataracs; LDontheCut; Supa Dups; Mitchum "Khan" Chin; Jim Perkins; Jamie Allensworth; David Bassett; Buddah Shampoo

Dirty Heads chronology
Home – Phantoms of Summer (2013)	Sound of Change (2014)	Dirty Heads (2016)

Singles from Sound of Change
- 1. "My Sweet Summer" Released: May 6, 2014; 2. "Sound of Change" Released: October 27, 2014; 3. "End of the World" Released: July 28, 2015

Sound of Change is the fourth studio album by reggae/rock/rap hybrid band the Dirty Heads. The album was released on July 8, 2014.

== Reception ==
Professional ratings
Review scores
Source	Rating
AllMusic	3.5/5 stars

The album debuted at No. 8 on the Billboard 200, and No. 2 on Top Rock Albums chart, selling around 21,000 copies in its first week. The album has sold 83,000 copies in the United States as of June 2016.

The album was a departure from the hip-hop reggae sound the band was known for, in favor of pop music.

== Track listing ==
All tracks produced by Rome Ramirez, with additional producers listed below.

No.	Title	Producer(s)	Length
1.	"Sound of Change"		3:32
2.	"My Sweet Summer"	The Cataracs	3:23
3.	"Burials"	Jim Perkins; Jamie Allensworth	2:56
4.	"Burn Slow" (featuring Tech N9ne)		3:48
5.	"Franco Eyed" (featuring B-Real)	LDontheCut	3:16
6.	"End of the World"		4:03
7.	"One Hand"		3:30
8.	"Radio"	Dwayne "Supa Dups" Chin-Quee; Mitchum "Khan" Chin (co.)	3:57
9.	"Medusa" (featuring Ward 21)	Supa Dups	3:36
10.	"Hear You Coming"	Dave Bassett	3:29
11.	"Silence"	Buddha Shampoo	4:15
12.	"Dark Days" (digital bonus track)		3:24
13.	"Running for Your Life" (digital bonus track)		3:47

== Personnel ==
Dirty Heads

- Jared Watson – vocals
- Dustin Bushnell – vocals, guitar
- Jon Olazabal – percussion
- Matt Ochoa – drums
- David Foral – bass guitar

Technical personnel

- Mike "Cheez" Brown – executive producer
- Charles Godfrey – engineer
- Anthony Kilhoffer – mixing
- Brian "Big Bass" Gardner – mastering

== Charts ==
Chart (2014)	Peak position
US Billboard 200	8
US Top Alternative Albums (Billboard)	1
US Independent Albums (Billboard)	1
US Top Rock Albums (Billboard)	2
US Indie Store Album Sales (Billboard)	7
