= Lead to Light =

Lead To Light
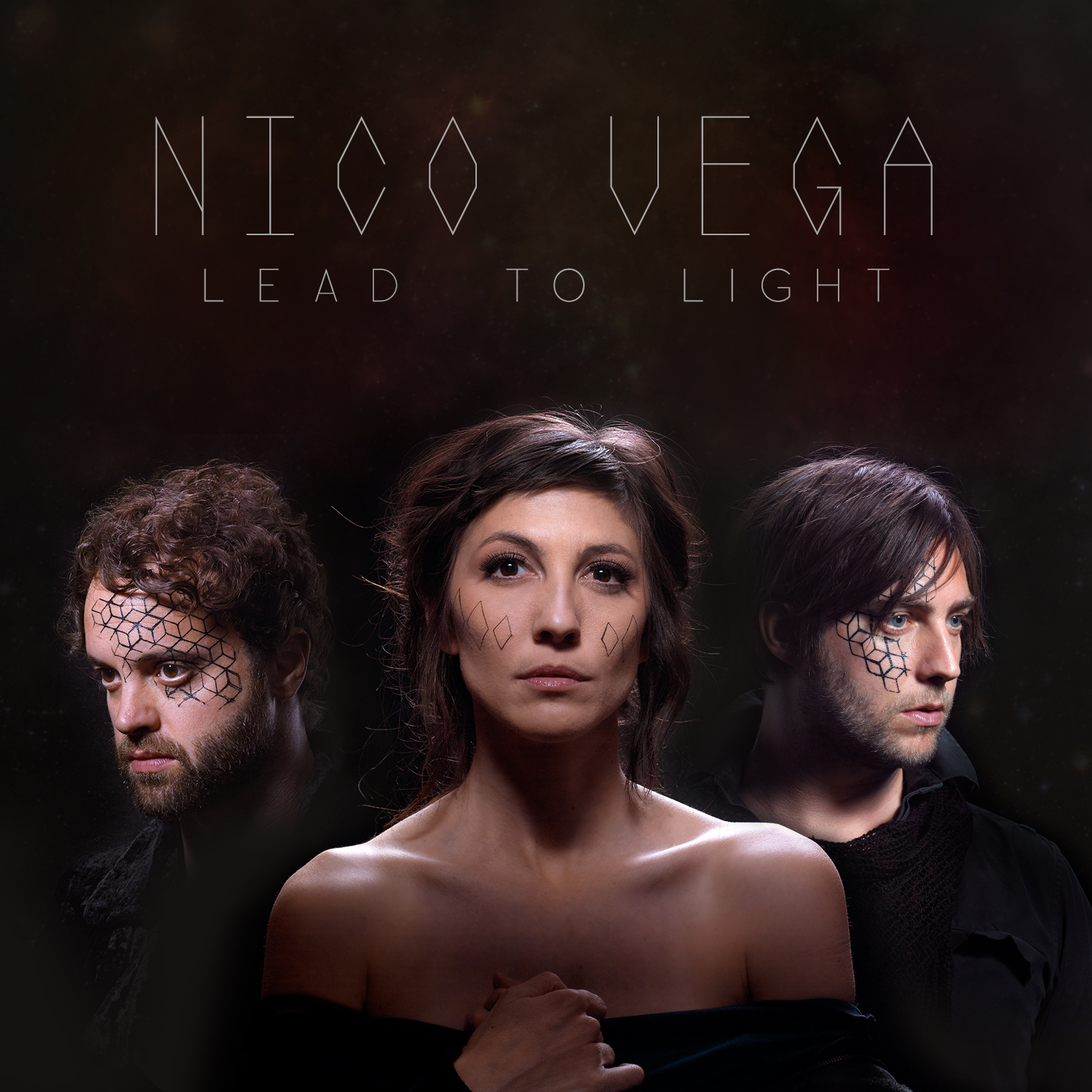

Studio album by Nico Vega
- Released: July 22, 2014
- Recorded: 2013, 2014 at Sonic Ranch (El Paso, Texas, United States) and Hobby Shop (Los Angeles, United States)
- Genre: Alternative rock
- Label: Five Seven Music
- Producer: Tim Edgar; Tony Hoffer; Dan Reynolds

Nico Vega chronology
Nico Vega (2009)	Lead To Light (2014)

Lead To Light is the second full-length album by American indie rock band Nico Vega. It was released on July 22, 2014 on iTunes. The album was produced by Dan Reynolds (Imagine Dragons), Tony Hoffer (Beck, Foster The People, M83), and Tim Edgar (Nico Vega).

== Media use ==
Track "I Believe (Get Over Yourself)" was performed live on VH1's Big Morning Buzz Live (episode 47) and Guitar Center Sessions (episode 81). The track was also featured in the trailer for HBO's Girls (TV series) season 4.

Nico Vega's cover version of "Bang Bang (My Baby Shot Me Down)" was the promotional single for the A&E, History Channel, and Lifetime miniseries Bonnie and Clyde: Dead and Alive (2013). It also featured on Britain's Got Talent (2014).

"Fury Oh Fury" featured in the launch trailer for popular video game BioShock Infinite (2013), 2014 American horror film The Devil's Hand (2014 film) and in the MTV comedy Awkward. (season 3, episode 16).

== Track listing ==
All tracks are written by Nico Vega except where otherwise noted.

No.	Title	Writer(s)	Producer(s)	Length
1.	"No Home"	Nico Vega	Hoffer	3:41
2.	"Dance"	Nico Vega	Edgar	4:22
3.	"I Believe (Get Over Yourself)"	Nico Vega; Dan Reynolds	Reynolds	4:32
4.	"Back of My Hand"	Nico Vega	Hoffer	3:04
5.	"Fury Oh Fury"	Nico Vega; Tim Edgar	Edgar	3:49
6.	"Bang Bang (My Baby Shot Me Down)"	Sonny Bono	Edgar	3:19
7.	"Simple"	Nico Vega	Edgar	3:44
8.	"I'm On Fire"	Nico Vega	Reynolds	3:42
9.	"Lightning"	Nico Vega; Adam Bravin; Justin Warfield	Edgar	4:13
10.	"Good"	Nico Vega	Edgar	5:05
11.	"Lead To Light"	Nico Vega	Edgar	3:39
12.	"Lucky One"	Nico Vega	Edgar	4:05
13.	"Protest Song"	Nico Vega	Edgar	3:37
14.	"Easier"	Nico Vega	Edgar	3:49
15.	"Witchy Night"	Nico Vega	Edgar	5:52
Total length:				60:33

== Personnel ==
Nico Vega

- Aja Volkman – vocals
- Rich Koehler – guitar
- Dan Epand – drums

== Charts ==
Chart (2014)	Peak position
US Heatseekers Albums (Billboard)	9
US Independent Albums (Billboard)	46
