= HB Surround Sound =

American Reggae Rock Band

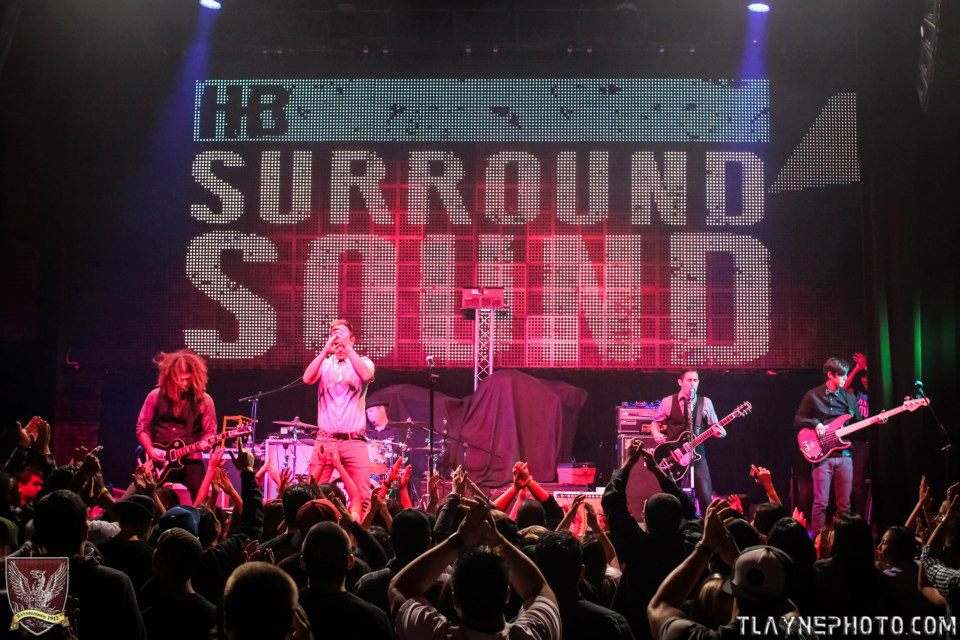
- HB Surround Sound live at the Yost Theatre in Santa Ana, CA

Background information
- Also known as: HBSS
- Origin: Huntington Beach, California, U.S.
- Genres: Punk; Reggae Rock; Ska; Metal; Alternative rock; Reggae Fusion
- Years active: 1999–2006; 2010–2014
- Label: Skin Industries
- Members: Jake Bushnell (RudeBoyGhost); Matt Denne; Doug Cooper (Mr. Cooper); Tim Tintari; Mike Broberg
- Past members: Jon Olazabal
- Website: hbsurroundsound.com

HB Surround Sound was a Reggae rock band formed in 1999. Vocalist Jake Bushnell is the brother of Dirty Heads guitarist and singer Duddy B (Dustin Bushnell). In the early 2000s, Duddy B and Jared Watson of Dirty Heads would perform live alongside HB Surround Sound and showcase their music at HBSS shows.

== Early history (1999–2006) ==
HB Surround Sound released 3 full-length albums before their first breakup in 2006. The band was originally known for blending Punk Rock, Metal & Reggae. With the help of their energetic live shows, HBSS soon became the face of Reggae/Rock in Orange County, CA during the early 2000s. After releasing their first 2 albums (HB Surround Sound [2000] and Kill all the Critics) independently, the band worked with producer Miguel Happoldt (Sublime (band), Long Beach Dub Allstars, The Ziggens) on their 3rd album "Mad World".

In 2005 HB Surround Sound was also featured in Will Smith's "Party Starter" music video as his band.

=== HB Surround Sound (2000) ===
In 2000 HB Surround Sound released their debut album titled "HB Surround Sound". The album contained 20 tracks plus a secret song at the end of "Another Song of Freedom (Acoustic)". The secret song contained a live performance of "Gimme The Mic" by HB Surround Sound along with Jake Bushnell's brother's band Dirty Heads.

The song "Summer of 99" was featured on the 1st Sense Boardwear Compilation, "Shit For Your Shit" released in October 2002.

=== Kill All The Critics ===
In 2002 the group released their second album titled "Kill All The Critics". This album also contained 2 tracks featuring the band Dirty Heads, titled "Dirty Heads" and "Gimme The Mic".

The song "Vegas" was featured on the "We'll Make A Monkey Outta You!" Compilation released in 2001.

=== Mad World ===
In 2006 HB Surround Sound released their third album "Mad World" produced by Miguel Happoldt of Sublime (band). Shortly after the release of the album the band broke up until their reunion in 2010.

The song "Big Truck" was featured on the "Sense Boardwear Compilation: High Rise".

The song "One In The Same" was featured on the "One Big Family 2" compilation released in 2006.

== Hiatus ==
After 6 years of playing shows together, the group disbanded. Jake Bushnell remained in the music scene and became tour manager for his brother's band Dirty Heads.

While on tour Bushnell recalls, "I literally, on the [Dirty Heads] tour bus, one day decided, 'I want to do this again,'" Bushnell said. "And so I called the rest of the band and asked if they wanted to play again. They said yes, I told The Dirty Heads that I was going to go back to my band and we just went for it."

== Reunion (2010–2014) ==
Four years later, HB Surround Sound regrouped in 2010 and tightened their sound.

"We do have a small contingency of people that definitely were there in the early days, coming to our shows," says vocalist Jake Bushnell. "But the beautiful thing is that there's a whole bunch of new fans that we're meeting and we're actually becoming a better band than we ever were and it's really exciting".

=== Back To Reality - EP ===
On May 3, 2011, HB Surround Sound put out their first release in 5 years and offered it as a free download. This EP clearly indicated a new direction the group was taking with their music by focusing mostly on playing ska. This EP was produced by The Interrupters (band) guitarist, Kevin Bivona.

=== Explode - EP ===
On February 21, 2012, the group released their EP titled "Explode". HBSS toured with Matisyahu & Dirty Heads to promote the release.

=== Get Your Dance On ===
Summer 2012 saw HB Surround Sound drop their first full-length album since "Mad World". On September 4, 2012, the band released "Get Your Dance On" while at the same time joining up with two major nationwide tours. The group spent the first half of summer 2012 with Sublime with Rome, Cypress Hill, and Pepper, while the back half of the summer saw HBSS out with Matisyahu and The Dirty Heads.

Bushnell stated that the band spent some quality time while recording the album in the studio. He described the album by stating, "We wanna be a little creepy with our sound,". "And this album is way more rock 'n' roll and we're super proud of it. We definitely think it's the best one we've done."

=== Turn It On - EP ===
On July 2, 2013, HB Surround Sound released their EP "Turn It On". The song “My Radio” was also released as a single and was played on the World Famous KROQ.

"Turn It On is a slightly new direction for us. We have always been known for taking risks and going to unpredictable places with our music and the Turn It On EP is a place we have always wanted to be musically. 'Turn It On' is 100% rock music yet feels exactly like an HB Surround Sound record. We went one solid direction on this 4 song EP and we feel this is our best music ever by far."

The band toured with Sublime with Rome, Pennywise (band), The Descendents (band), and Iration to promote the EP. As a “thank you” to the fans, HB Surround Sound gave out 5,000 copies of the CD throughout the tour to anyone who stopped by their merch booth. This was the band's final release to feature frontman Jake Bushnell.

== Members ==
Members

- Matt Denne – co-lead vocals (1999–2006; 2010–2013); lead vocals (2013–2014); guitar (1999–2006, 2010–2014)
- Tim Tintari – drums (2010–2014)
- Mike Broberg – bass (1999–2006; 2010–2014)
- Mr. Cooper – guitar (1999–2006; 2010–2014)

Former members

- Jake Bushnell – co-lead vocals (1999–2006, 2010–2013); drums (1999–2006); percussion (2010–2013)
- Jon Olazabal – percussion (1999–2006)

== Discography ==
- HB Surround Sound (2000)
- Kill All The Critics (2002)
- Mad World (2006)
- Back To Reality - EP (2011)
- Explode - EP (2012)
- Get Your Dance On (2012)
- Turn It On - EP (2013)
- Surround Sound - EP (2014)

== Tours ==
HB Surround Sound has shared the stage with popular acts like Dirty Heads, Sublime With Rome, Pepper, Cypress Hill, Matisyahu, Descendents, Pennywise, Avenged Sevenfold, The Interrupters, The Aggrolites and Bad Religion.

- Matisyahu/Dirty Heads Tour (2012)
- Sublime with Rome/Cypress Hill/Pepper Tour (2012)
- Sublime with Rome Summer Tour (2013)
