= Come Back Around (disambiguation) =

"Come Back Around" is a song by Feeder from the album Comfort in Sound. The phrase may also refer to:

- "Come Back Round", a song by Matt Brouwer from Where's Our Revolution
- "Come Back Round", a song by Dirty Heads from Super Moon
