= Cabin by the Sea =

Studio album by Dirty Heads
- Released: June 19, 2012
- Length: 49:53
- Label: Five Seven Music

Dirty Heads chronology
Any Port in a Storm (2008)	Cabin by the Sea (2012)	Home – Phantoms of Summer (2013)

Singles from Cabin by the Sea
- 1. "Spread Too Thin" Released: March 13, 2012; 2. "Dance All Night" Released: June 11, 2012; 3. "Cabin By The Sea" Released: February 12, 2013

Professional ratings
Review scores
Source	Rating
AltRockLive	9/10 stars
AllMusic	3.5/5 stars
[&].com	4.7/5 stars

Cabin by the Sea is the second studio album released by American reggae band The Dirty Heads on June 19, 2012.

The first single, "Spread Too Thin", premiered on KROQ at 4:20 on March 9, 2012 and was released on iTunes on March 13.

== Track listing ==
No.	Title	Length
1.	"Arrival"	1:59
2.	"Cabin by the Sea"	4:05
3.	"Disguise"	3:26
4.	"Spread Too Thin"	3:00
5.	"Your Love" (featuring Kymani Marley)	3:17
6.	"Mongo Push" (featuring Rome Ramirez)	2:56
7.	"Dance All Night" (featuring Matisyahu)	3:26
8.	"Hipster"	3:47
9.	"Notice"	2:26
10.	"Day by Day"	3:34
11.	"Smoke Rings" (featuring Del the Funky Homosapien)	3:03
12.	"Burn by Myself"	3:30
13.	"We Will Rise"	3:59
14.	"Best of Us"	3:07
15.	"Love Letters"	3:11
16.	"Farewell"	1:07
17.	"On My Way" (bonus track)	3:18
