= Beast (Nico Vega song) =

Single by Nico Vega

from the album Nico Vega
- Released: July 9, 2013
- Genre: Alternative rock, hard rock
- Length: 5:00
- Label: Five Seven Music
- Songwriter(s): Nico Vega, Michael Peña
- Producer(s): Tim Edgar

Nico Vega singles chronology
"Beast" (2013)	"I Believe (Get Over Yourself)" (2014)

"Beast" is a song written by the American alternative rock band Nico Vega. The song was originally recorded for the EP chooseyourwordspoorly (2006) but a later version was released as a single in 2013. It reached No. 26 on the Billboard Hot Rock Songs chart.

== Versions ==
"Beast" was first recorded for the 2006 EP chooseyourwordspoorly. This is the shortest version of the song at just 2:36.

A reworked version of the song was recorded for eponymous debut album Nico Vega in 2009. The track runs for 4:01, but owing to non-song content afterwards the track time is 5:40. This version, minus the extra content, was rereleased on the Fury Oh Fury EP in 2013. (For unconfirmed reasons, digital downloads of Nico Vega no longer include "Beast" but the track remains available on physical CD pressings or as part of Fury Oh Fury.)

An acoustic version of the reworked song was recorded for the Nico Vega Covers Nico Vega & Rod Stewart EP in 2011. This version runs to 3:01.

The single version of the song (known as the 'extended version') was released in July 2013 and runs for 5:00. This version mixes portions of the 2009 and 2011 versions.

== Live performances and media use ==
Nico Vega performed "Beast" live on Last Call with Carson Daly (2009).

"Beast" has been used repeatedly in other media. It featured in the films The Collector (2009) and Answers to Nothing (2011), commercials for the TV show Major Crimes and for films Jack Reacher (2012) and Pacific Rim (2013), and the teaser trailer to Vampire Academy: Blood Sisters (2014). Professional wrestler Drew Gulak used "Beast" as his entrance theme from 2009 to 2012. "Beast" is featured in the popular 2013 video game BioShock Infinite, with the extended version of the song used heavily in the game's marketing - this appearance was credited by lead singer Aja Volkman as "one of the biggest things that's ever happened to my band". "Beast" is featured on the NBA 2K17 soundtrack.

In 2020, this music was featured in Netflix film Spenser Confidential.

== Music video ==
Nico Vega released the music video for "Beast" on February 6, 2013.

== Charts ==
Chart (2013–14)	Peak position
France (SNEP)	199
US Rock Songs (Billboard)	26
