= I Believe (Get Over Yourself) =

Single by Nico Vega

from the album Lead to Light
- Released: February 25, 2014
- Recorded: 2013
- Genre: Alternative rock
- Length: 4:31
- Label: Five Seven
- Songwriter(s): Nico Vega; Dan Reynolds
- Producer(s): Nico Vega; Dan Reynolds

Nico Vega singles chronology
"Beast" (2013)	"I Believe (Get Over Yourself)" (2014)

"I Believe (Get Over Yourself)" is a song by American alternative rock band Nico Vega, and Dan Reynolds (of Imagine Dragons). The song was originally recorded for the band's second album Lead to Light (July 22, 2014).

== Live performances and media use ==
Nico Vega performed "I Believe (Get Over Yourself)" on VH1's Big Morning Buzz Live (Ep. 947, 2014) and Guitar Center Sessions (Ep. 81, 2014) hosted by Nic Harcourt.

The track was featured in the trailer for HBO's Girls (TV series) season 4.

== Music video ==
Nico Vega released the music video for "I Believe (Get Over Yourself)" on June 19, 2014.
