= Egyptian (band) =

American indie rock band

- Origin: Las Vegas, Nevada, U.S.
- Genres: Alternative rock; indie rock
- Years active: 2010–2018
- Spinoffs: Imagine Dragons; Nico Vega
- Past members: Dan Reynolds; Aja Volkman

Egyptian was an American indie rock duo band and the side project of formerly married singers Dan Reynolds and Aja Volkman.

== Formation ==
Invited to perform an opening set for Nico Vega, Dan Reynolds met Aja Volkman in 2010. He invited her to help him finish some demos he was working on. The two began a collaborative process which they titled Egyptian. They recorded, produced, and released independently a four track eponymous EP digitally. Their other bands Imagine Dragons and Nico Vega have also toured together in 2011, 2013 and 2014.

== Discography ==
=== EPs ===
- Egyptian – EP (2011)

=== Also featured on ===
- Answers to Nothing (soundtrack) (2011) – "Fade"

== Music videos ==
Year	Video	Director
November 15, 2011	"Fade"	Matthew Leutwyler
