= Zeroscape =

- Origin: Toronto, Ontario, Canada
- Genre: Reggae metal
- Years active: 2001–present
- Members: Binski; Speshalizt; JJ; Matt
- Past members: Maaaax; Jizzle
- Website: zeroscapemusic.com

Zeroscape is a Canadian four-piece reggae metal band based in Toronto, that formed in 2001 on the principle that any and all music genres could "Melt" together. The three genres that are most prominent in Zeroscape's songs are metal, reggae and rap but are not limited to those three. In their upcoming third studio album (yet to be named) there is a ska influence in the album as demonstrated during their 2009 UK Tour with InMe.

== On tour ==
From 2001 until 2003, Zeroscape Played in local spots in and around Toronto. In 2004, Zeroscape started their "Braille" Eastern Canada Tour in support of their first studio album Braille with over thirty shows in the year. In 2005, the members of Zeroscape sold all their belongings, and hit the road on a six-month 98 show Braille European tour that led them through nine countries followed by the 2006–2007 Till Death Do Us tour, and their 2008 Against All Odds tour. In 2009, Zeroscape joined English alternative rock band InMe on their Britain's Got F***ed two-month tour.

According To Swindonmusic.co.uk Zeroscape have played over 400 dates in over 17 countries and shared stages with bands like The Killers, The Hives, Sick of It All, Five Finger Death Punch, In This Moment, Walls of Jericho and played on the Ernie Ball stage during the Warped Tour 2009.

== Discography ==
- Braille (2004)
- ... And If This Is the End I Will (2006)
- Friday Night (EP) (2009)
- The Funeral (Single) (2009)
- Finish Dem (2017)
