= Tomorrows Bad Seeds =

American reggae rock band

- Origin: Hermosa Beach, California
- Genres: Reggae rock
- Years active: 2004–present
- Labels: Island/Empire Records, UrbanTone Records
- Members: Moises Juarez; Matthew McEwan; Rico Degallo; Justin Iannelli; Pat Salmon
- Past members: Johnny McEwan; Al Arnado; Sean Chapman; Andre Davis
- Website: www.labadseeds.com

Tomorrows Bad Seeds, commonly abbreviated TBS, is an American reggae rock band from Hermosa Beach, California. The band's line-up consists of Moises "Moi" Juarez (lead vocals), Matthew "Mets" McEwan (vocals/guitar), Rico Degallo (vocals/guitar), Justin Iannelli (bass), and Pat Salmon (drums). Their surf/skate beach culture, "hood b-boy" influences of South Bay helped define their sound; a mix of reggae, rock, and pop.

== History ==
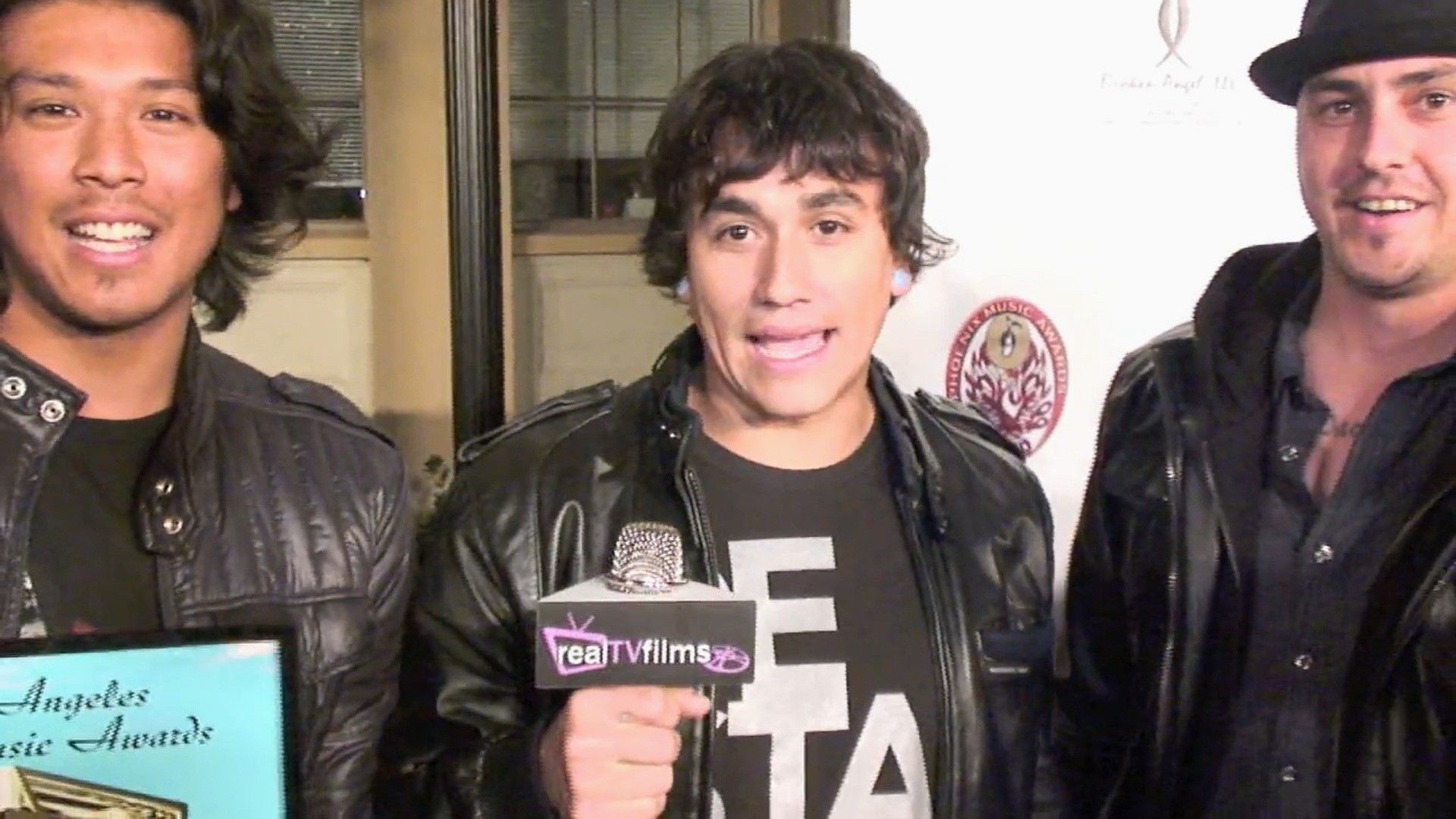
Left to right: Sean Chapman, Moises Juarez, Matthew McEwan in 2010

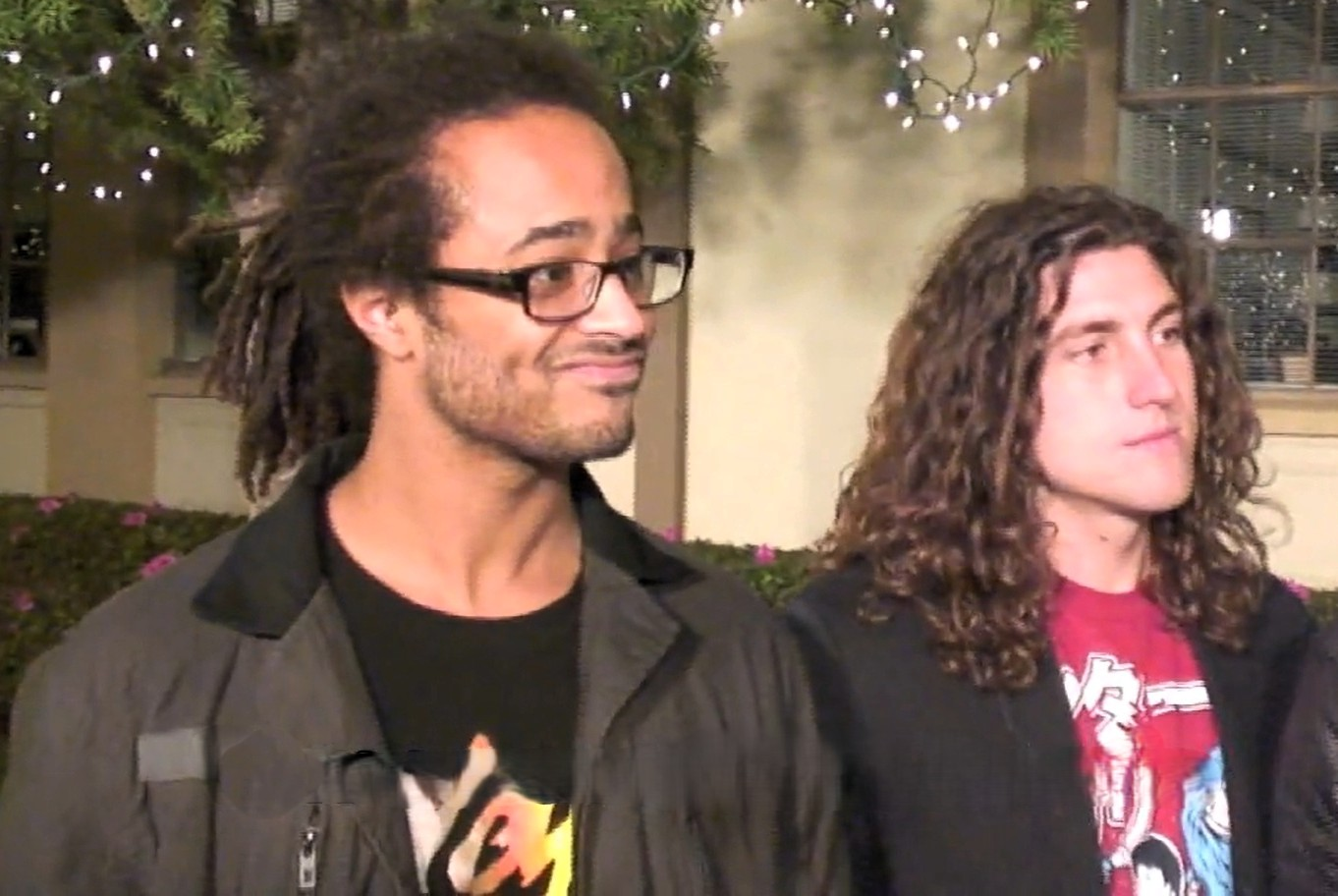
Left to right: Andre Davis, Pat Salmon in 2010

=== Early years ===
Tomorrows Bad Seeds was formed by lead singer Moises "Moi" Juarez and guitar player and turntablist Mathew "Mets" McEwan in Hermosa Beach, California in 2004. Later, Johnny McEwan, Mets’ cousin, joined the band as their drummer. The band's original bass player was Al Arnado, and Andre Davis was recruited as his replacement when he left the band. Sean Chapman, a high school classmate of other members of the band, was added later as a guitar player and backing vocalist.

The band's name came from a graffiti crew they had grown up around called "TBS". They used the acronym to come up with Tomorrows Bad Seeds as a reflection of their roots.

=== Early Prayers (2007) ===
The band released their debut studio album Early Prayers in June 2007 on the independent label UrbanTone Records, featuring the singles, "Rhyme & Reason", "Vices", "Warrior Poet", and "Love Street".

The same year, the band toured all over Hawaii on four separate tours throughout Kona and Hilo in support of their debut album. However, the response was mixed.

In 2009, Tomorrows Bad Seeds covered the mainland United States playing at venues like House of Blues in Hollywood, Vault 350, The Knitting Factory, Key Club, Galaxy Theatre, and the world-famous Roxy Theatre.

During the recording of TBS' second album in 2009, Johnny McEwan left the band and was replaced by Andre's friend Pat Salmon.

=== Sacred For Sale (2010) ===
On May 25, 2010, Tomorrows Bad Seeds released their second album Sacred For Sale. Following the CD release, the band was added on to the Warped Tour 2010 lineup and played on their Skullcandy stage.

On August 18, 2010, the band closed the Roxy Theatre portion of the Sunset Music Festival. They then co-headlined a tour with Passafire. Also on the same date, Tomorrows Bad Seeds were honored with the Commercial Success Award at the Los Angeles Music Awards for having reached over 150,000 downloads for that year.

On December 2, 2010, Tomorrows Bad Seeds began their Holidaze Acoustic Tour of California. Each show was a one of a kind performance, providing a different lineup of TBS' hits. The band closed 2010 on New Year's Eve with a headlining show at BriXton in Redondo Beach, California. On January 9 and 10, 2011 the band filmed their first music video for “Reflect”. Two day later Tomorrows Bad Seeds filmed a national TV performance for The Late Late Show with Craig Ferguson, which aired on March 3, 2011. They performed "Only For You" from their second album "Sacred For Sale."

On August 8, 2011, the band released their single "Nice & Slow". This single charted at #1 on the CDbaby Reggae chart upon release. TBS worked with their sponsor Body Glove to create a summer-themed video to accompany the new single. The "Nice & Slow" video won MTVU Video of The Week and was added to their rotation on October 14, 2011.

=== The Great Escape (2011) ===
On November 29, 2011, TBS began recording their third studio album titled, "The Great Escape" with Grammy Award winner and seven-time nominee Damon Elliott at Village Studios. Their first single, "One Way", co-written with Tim Myers (formerly of OneRepublic), made the Billboard Indicator Charts.

=== Changes in the band (2012–2017) ===
In 2014, Moi, Sean and Mets started a side project called Life.

In January 2017, Sean Chapman left the band to pursue a solo production and songwriting career.

In the same month of 2017, Urbantone Records released the band from its contract, allowing the band to sign with a new label Island Records' own Empire Records.

=== Illuminate (2018) ===
On May 25, 2018, TBS released their fourth studio album titled, Illuminate on Mensch House Records. It features 13-tracks with the singles, "Back to You", "Trinity", "Tell Me Mary", and "Frequency" featuring Jason J.

TBS released a single titled "iBurn" featuring Dan Kelly of Fortunate Youth on April 7, 2022, as well as a music video. Two weeks later, on April 20, the band released another single, titled "Do You?".

=== Sugar Shack Sessions acoustic EP (2022) ===
In the summer of 2022, Tomorrows Bad Seeds visited popular reggae rock studio, Sugar Shack in Bonita Springs, Florida to record an acoustic set of their greatest hits. They released Live at Sugar Shack Sessions digitally on August 24, 2022.

On July 7, 2023, TBS released a single and music video titled "Ghetto Bird" featuring local rapper Chay.

== Music style and influence ==
Since most of the group grew up in the South Bay, they were highly influenced by the reggae, rock, punk culture and bands like Sublime, Pepper, Pennywise among others. After releasing both records TBS has established the band's sound as a fusion of rock, reggae, ska punk, surf rock, hip hop and blues.

== Lineup ==
=== Current band members ===
- Moises Juarez – lead vocals
- Mathew McEwan – vocals/guitar
- Rico Degallo - vocals/guitar
- Justin Iannelli - bass
- Pat Salmon – drums

=== Former band members ===
- Johhny McEwan – drums
- Al Arnado – bass
- Sean Chapman – guitar/backing vocals
- Andre Davis – bass

== Discography ==
=== Albums ===
Tomorrows Bad Seeds chart history
Year	Album	Label	Billboard peak
2007	Early Prayers	UrbanTone Records	—
2010	Sacred For Sale	UrbanTone Records	—
2012	The Great Escape	UrbanTone Records	—
2013	V (EP)	UrbanTone Records	—
2018	Illuminate	Mensch House Records	—
2022	Sugar Shack Sessions (Acoustic)	Sugarshack Records	—

=== Singles ===
Title	Release date	Album
"Bad Seeds"	June 2007	Early Prayers
"Love Street"	June 2007	Early Prayers
"Rhyme & Reason"	June 2007	Early Prayers
"Vices"	June 2007	Early Prayers
"Warrior Poet"	June 2007	Early Prayers
"Nice & Slow"	May 25, 2010	Sacred For Sale
"Slow Down"	May 25, 2010	Sacred For Sale
"Tell Me Why"	May 25, 2010	Sacred For Sale
"Reflect"	September 7, 2010	Sacred For Sale
"One Way"	November 29, 2011	The Great Escape
"That's Life" (feat. Watsky)	November 29, 2011	The Great Escape
"War Letter"	November 29, 2011	The Great Escape
"Warrior Poet" (DubStep Remix by Sygnal)	January 10, 2012	(Single)
"Throwback"	November 13, 2015	(Single)
"No Matter What"	April 6, 2017	Illuminate
"Tell Me Mary"	April 17, 2017	Illuminate
"Frequency"	March 14, 2018	Illuminate
"Trinity"	March 30, 3018	Illuminate
"Back To You"	May 18, 2018	Illuminate
"Surf Trip"	December 6, 2019	(Single)
"iBurn" (feat. Dan Kelly of Fortunate Youth)	April 7, 2022	(Single)
"Do You?"	April 20, 2022	(Single)
"Ghetto Bird" (feat. Chay)	July 7, 2023	(Single)

== Television appearances ==
March 3, 2011– The Late Late Show with Craig Ferguson on CBS
