= Nico Vega =

American alternative rock band

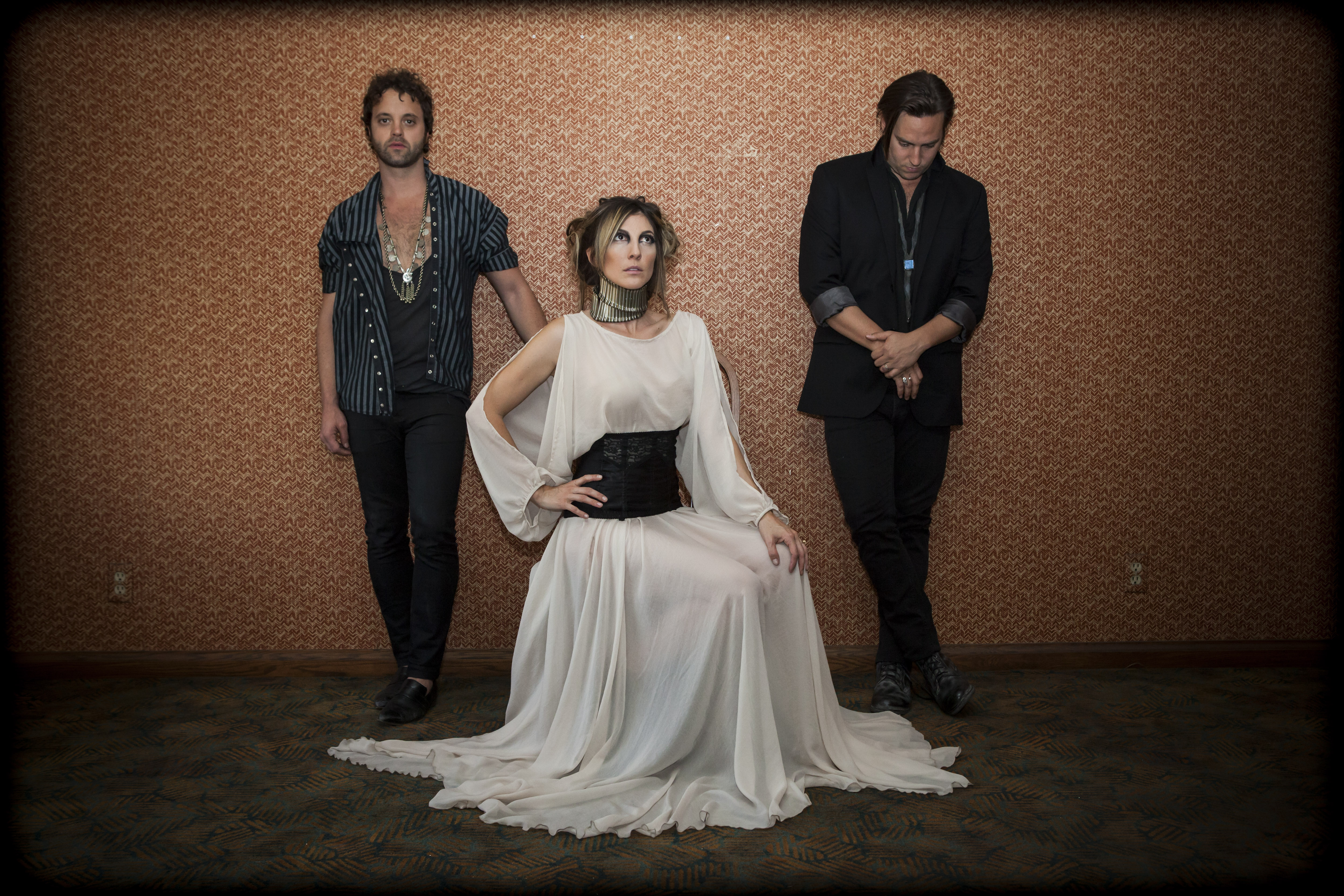
- The band Nico Vega as a three-piece, in 2014.

Background information
- Origin: Los Angeles, California, U.S.
- Genre: Alternative rock
- Years active: 2005–present (Note: On hiatus throughout 2016–2018, and again in 2020–2023.)
- Labels: Five Seven; MySpace
- Spinoffs: Egyptian; TWWO
- Members: Aja Volkman; Rich Koehler; Dan Epand; Michael Peña
- Past members: Jamila Weaver
- Website: nicovega.com

Nico Vega is an American indie rock band formed in 2005 in Los Angeles, California, United States. They consist of lead vocalist Aja Volkman, lead guitarist Rich Koehler, drummer Dan Epand, and bassist (former drummer) Michael Peña.

The group has released two albums Nico Vega (2009) and Lead to Light (2014). Billboard described Lead to Light as possessing "some of the most unstoppable pop-rock hooks heard all year." After a hiatus announced on June 6, 2016, the band returned nearly two years later on April 6, 2018, when Volkman announced a new single and a return on her Instagram.

In 2020, the band went into a second hiatus as Volkman and Epand formed a new duo called TWWO, and released their debut EP "Pull the Knife Out". The band reunited in 2023, with the return of Michael Pena, as they announced production of new music and an upcoming show in Los Angeles.

== History ==
Volkman began writing songs while in high school in Eugene, Oregon. Later she moved to Los Angeles and started performing on her own. She had hoped to eventually form a band. That happened when one night after a show in 2005, Mike Peña approached her about singing with him and Rich Koehler. The band called themselves Nico Vega after Mike's mother. However, in 2007 Mike left the band to pursue acting and enjoy fatherhood. At that point, Dan Epand joined the band as their new drummer and has been a driving force behind their continued creativity.

Nico Vega developed a reputation as a live band after touring with Gavin Rossdale (of Bush) (2009), Neon Trees (2009, 2012), Manic Street Preachers (2009–2010), Metric (2010), She Wants Revenge (2011), Blondie (2011), and Imagine Dragons (2010, 2013, 2014) among others. They have also opened for No Doubt and KISS.

=== Nico Vega (2009) ===
Nico Vega released several independent EPs and recorded their own videos to get their music out. In 2009, Nico Vega released their first full-length album via MySpace Records. The album was co-produced by Tim Edgar, a friend of the band, and Linda Perry (Pink, Gwen Stefani, Christina Aguilera). Linda produced three songs for the album: "So So Fresh", "Wooden Dolls" and "Gravity". The album was mixed by Tchad Blake (The Black Keys, Sheryl Crow). In 2013, Nico Vega released the Fury Oh Fury EP and re-released single "Beast", which garnered national popularity when it featured in the video game BioShock Infinite, resulting in more than 5 million streams and downloads. Drummer Dan Epand also features on the recent project of Andy Summers (of The Police), Circa Zero.

=== Lead to Light (2014) ===
Second album Lead to Light was released via Five Seven Music on July 22, 2014. The album was co-produced by Dan Reynolds (Imagine Dragons), Tony Hoffer (Beck, Fitz and the Tantrums, M83) and Tim Edgar (Nico Vega). Single "I Believe (Get Over Yourself)" was co-written by Dan Reynolds (of Imagine Dragons). Nico Vega performed "I Believe (Get Over Yourself)" on VH1's Big Morning Buzz Live., and was featured in the trailer for season four of the American Television show Girls. Track "Lightning" were co-written with members of She Wants Revenge. NPR premiered track "I'm On Fire" via All Songs Considered and offered it as a free download. USA Today premiered the track "No Home".

Nico Vega performed at Life Is Beautiful Festival (2013), The Great Escape Festival (2014), and Reading and Leeds Festivals (2014).

=== Hiatus and reunions ===
On June 6, 2016, Aja Volkman announced in a post on the band's official Facebook page, that Nico Vega was taking an indefinite hiatus. Aja went on to apologize to fans for not staying in better communication, while also thanking fans for their continued support over the years. In regard to if this meant the band was breaking up, Aja said, "I can't say that it's over forever, because nobody knows the future. But it is over for now."

On April 5, 2018, Volkman returned to Instagram to announce the return of the band and a new single, "Little Operator", which was released the following day. This was followed up by the 5-song "Wars" EP, released September 14, 2018.

In June 2020, Nico Vega was on hiatus, as Aja Volkman and Dan Epand have formed a new band called, “TWWO".

In December 2023, Nico Vega announced on social media that Nico Vega, along with Pena (with the exception of Weaver), have returned and are hosting an upcoming show in Los Angeles opening for Sainte Motel at the Bellwether. They also announced that they are making new music, with the new extended play, "Make It Out Alive" released on November 14, 2024.

== Members ==
Current lineup

- Aja Volkman – lead vocals (2005–2020, 2023–present)
- Rich Koehler – lead guitar (2005–2020, 2023–present)
- Michael Peña – drums (2005–2007) bass (2023–present)
- Dan Epand – drums (2007–2020, 2023–present)

Other members

- Jamila Weaver – bass (2012–2013)

== Discography ==
=== Studio albums ===
- Nico Vega (2009)
- Lead to Light (2014) Heatseekers #9

=== EPs ===
- Chooseyourwordspoorly (2006)
- Cocaine Cooked the Brain (2007)
- No Child Left Behind (2007)
- Nico Vega Covers Nico Vega and Rod Stewart (2011)
- Fury Oh Fury (2013) Heatseekers #17
- Wars (2018)
- Make it Out Alive (2024)

=== Singles ===
- "Beast" (2009, re-released on 2013 as an official single & as a "Vicetone v. Nico Vega remix" through Monstercat)
- "Bang Bang (My Baby Shot Me Down)" (2013)
- "I Believe (Get Over Yourself)" (2014)
- "Perfect Day" (2015)
- "Little Operator" (2018)
- "$5" (2024)
- "Crazy Things We Do For Love" (2024)
- "Make It Out Alive" (2024)

== Videography ==
List of music videos, with directors, showing year released
Title	Year	Director(s)	Album
"Burn Burn"	2009	SKINNY	Nico Vega
"Gravity"	2010	Marcus Dunstan	Nico Vega
"So So Fresh"	2012	—N/a	Nico Vega
"We Are The Art"	2012	Daniel Epand	We Are the Art - Single
"Easier"	2012	Daniel Epand	Easier - Single
"Beast"	2013	Daniel Epand	Fury Oh Fury EP
"I Believe (Get Over Yourself)"	2014	Daniel Epand	Lead to Light
"$5"	2024	Daniel Epand	$5 - Single / Make It Out Alive EP
