= Subrosa Union =

American reggae rock band from Austin, Texas formed in 2000

SUbrosa Union
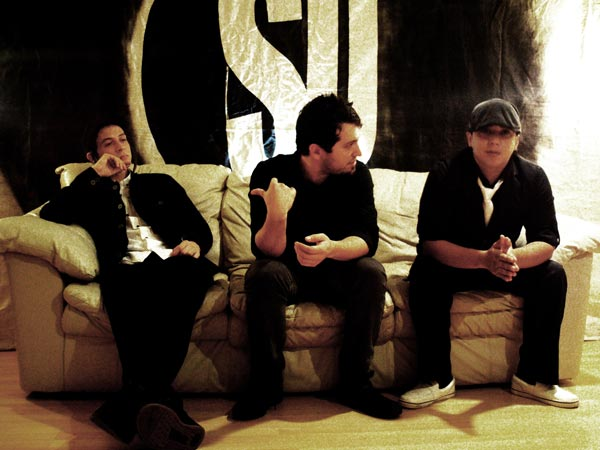

Background information
- Origin: Austin, Texas, United States
- Genres: Reggae rock
- Years active: 2000-2018
- Label: Independent
- Members: Michael Anaya; Chris Paulos; Marc Martell; Paul Valenzuela
- Website: subrosaunion

Subrosa Union is an American reggae rock band from Austin, Texas formed in 2000. The band comprises Michael Anaya, Chris Paulos, and Paul Valenzuela. Originally from El Paso, Texas, the trio relocated to Austin in 2005.

To date, Subrosa Union, aka SU, has released three studio albums. The band released its debut album Looking Forward in 2007, and then played the "Operation Looking Forward" tour for Armed Forces Entertainment. In 2008, SU released their SUn City album, containing live and pre-released tracks which had gained notoriety during their border city playing days. In 2010, SU released One Night Stand, produced by Mike Cosgrove of Alien Ant Farm. In June 2013 the band released their independent "Rise from the Ashes" 5-track EP.

== History ==
=== Early career (1999–2007) ===
Subrosa Union started out as simply Subrosa in 1999 in a garage on the East side of El Paso. The "Union" was added by Michael during a get-together at his father's home in Laredo, Texas. Michael noted there were a couple of other bands with the title "Subrosa" and had no desire to change the title of the band's name; he noted the Italian wall art entitled "Union" in his father's home and suggested adding the "Union" to Subrosa. The name is a play on words; "sabrosa", a Spanish word which means "full of flavor, delicious-tasting", and "sub-rosa", meaning "under the rose" - an ancient symbol denoting a secret. As the naming conflicts led them to add "Union" to their name later on, enlarging the "U" in Subrosa, added to the moniker of "SUbrosa Union" or "SU".

This three-piece rock outfit, have resided in Austin, Texas since 2005 to escape El Paso's hard-rock and death-metal scenes. Co-founders Michael Anaya (lead guitarist/vocalist), Chris Paulos (bassist) and Paul Valenzuela (drummer) met during a 1999 Incubus and Deftones concert, where as Michael states “we were so psyched and impressed that he and the others decided that night to form a band”. Stylistically, the band is influenced by Carlos Santana, Led Zeppelin, Bob Marley, Jimi Hendrix, Stevie Ray Vaughan, Sublime, 311 and Elvis Presley, as well as the sounds of reggae, hip-hop and alternative music.

Although the trio could not gain access to the larger more popular venues in their early days, they became well known for their live high energy performances and catchy tunes. Subrosa Union gained popularity through their self-released EPs and local radio play for their reggae rock song, "Sweet Mexicana", one of the first songs they wrote together. While they were working locally, producer R. W. Rushing, who has worked with numerous up-and-coming Austin bands, overheard their music; impressed with what he heard, he subsequently provided SUbrosa Union the opportunity to create their first full-length album; Mastering their independently released freshman album Looking Forward in Austin. Their album received attention and accolades from Armed Forces Entertainment (AFE).

=== 2008-2009 ===
In early 2008 Subrosa Union was profiled in Austin Music with their recent release Looking Forward. Pete Lansing stated, "The band's El Paso roots bring an undeniable border influence, a fresh addition to the world of reggae/rock crossovers. The Santana-does-reggae "Rising Up," and cumbia driven rhythms and half-Spanish lyrics of "Caramelo" showcase the bands creative peaks."

In 2008 SU was signed by Armed Forces Entertainment to complete two major overseas tours for the troops. After being in the Middle East (Kyrgyzstan, Afghanistan, Kuwait, UAE, Qatar, Bahrain and a US Navy guided missile cruiser in the Persian Gulf) the trio headed onto Korea, Japan, Okinawa and Guam.

SU also shared the Pollstar pages being introduced as "New Artists" and profiled for their Armed Forces Entertainment overseas tours.

April 2009, SUbrosa Union received a call from a Pittsburgh, PA detective who knew of their contribution to the troops; asking them if they would be interested in performing at a benefit for three police officers who had died in the line of duty earlier that year. SU headlined the "Musical Memorial Tour for the Fallen Heroes", benefiting the families of Pittsburgh Police Officers], Paul Sciullo II, Stephen Mayhle and Eric Kelly.

SUbrosa Union performed on Saturday, May 9, 2009, at the Beverly Hilton, at the Noche de Niños event. The event also featured appearances by Arnold Schwarzenegger, Jennifer Lopez, Annette Bening & Warren Beatty, Dancing with the Stars, Raphael Saadiq (soul artist), Emily Bear (a child prodigy pianist), and Tim Callobre (guitarist/pianist/composer). Noche de Niños is an event inspired by a former patient, eleven-year-old Dustin Meraz, who was suffering from a terminal cancer. Dustin's wish before dying was simply to have his life make a difference for other seriously ill children, and inspire grown-ups to have the courage to care about and provide support to kids in need.

In 2009 SUbrosa Union added guitarist Marc Martell to their lineup. Playing official and unofficial South by Southwest showcases for the past 5 years, the band has continued to develop strongly within the Austin music scene.

=== 2010-2018 ===
In 2010, SU released One Night Stand, produced by Mike Cosgrove of Alien Ant Farm. The addition of an extra guitarist/vocalist gave the original trio more leverage to deliver the intricate harmonies and orchestration displayed in their first independent album, One Night Stand, which was produced in Los Angeles by Alien Ant Farm drummer, Mike Cosgrove. The album's first single, a post-pop rock track against a ballad backdrop called "6th Street Beauty Queen", also appears in a short music video clip. SUbrosa Union has played SXSW officially and unofficially over the past 5 years and have tracked and extensive tour log all around the world for Armed Forces Entertainment performing around the world in such places as Afghanistan, Bahrain, United Arab Emirates, Kyrgyzstan, Korea and Japan.

Michael, Chris, and Paul had various projects that they wanted to engage in and take a break from the SU scene: Michael wanted to develop music in other musical genres, most notably electronic dance music (EDM), and rock, while supporting other bands such as Alien Ant Farm as a contract player, on a recent 3-month tour and local artist support (in and around Austin) with Jim Avery and the Gunslingers. SU have recently recommenced performing and touring.

== Band members ==
- Michael Anaya - guitar/vocals
- Chris Paulos - bass guitar
- Marc Martell - guitar/back-up vocals
- Paul Valenzuela- drums

== Discography ==
Year	Album	Label
2007	Looking Forward	Fugamundi Records
2007	Taste of Austin SxSW 2007	5th Street Studios
2008	SUn City	SUBrosa Union
2010	One Nite Stand	Independent
2013	Rise From the Ashes	Independent
