= Home – Phantoms of Summer =

Studio album by The Dirty Heads
- Released: October 29, 2013
- Length: 34:05
- Label: Five Seven
- Producers: Lewis Richards; Jim Perkins

The Dirty Heads chronology
Cabin by the Sea (2012)	Home – Phantoms of Summer (2013)	Sound of Change (2014)

Professional ratings
Review scores
Source	Rating
AllMusic	3/5 stars

Home – Phantoms of Summer is the third album by reggae/rock/rap hybrid band The Dirty Heads. The album was released on October 29, 2013.

== Track listing ==
No.	Title	Length
1.	"Intro (Anchors Up)"	1:21
2.	"Warming Sun"	3:37
3.	"Coming Home"	3:07
4.	"Strike Gently"	3:52
5.	"Garland"	3:49
6.	"Phantom"	1:51
7.	"Higher and Higher"	3:21
8.	"Gold to Me"	3:47
9.	"Cabin by the Sea" (live)	3:46
10.	"Sloth's Revenge"	3:33
11.	"Outro (Beast of the Lake)"	2:01
12.	"Crazy Bitches" (digital bonus track)	2:18

== Personnel ==
Dirty Heads

- Jared Watson – vocals
- Dustin Bushnell – vocals, guitar
- Jon Olazabal – percussion
- Matt Ochoa – drums
- David Foral – bass guitar

Additional musicians

- Phil Simpkin – additional vocals
- Shawn Taylor – additional vocals
- Ryan Radcliff – lap steel guitar

Technical personnel

- Lewis Richards – producer (1-9, 11-12), engineer, mixing, mastering
- Jim Perkins – producer (10)
