= Life (band) =

American pop-rock band

- Origin: California, U.S.
- Genres: Alternative rock, Pop rock
- Years active: 2012–present
- Label: Urbantone Group
- Members: Sean Chapman; Moises Juarez; Matthew McEwan
- Website: lifemusic.com

Life are an American alternative rock/pop band from Hermosa Beach, California, made up of the founding members of Tomorrows Bad Seeds, Moises Juarez, Sean Chapman and Matthew "Mets" McEwan. Moi, Sean and Mets were friends from school and grew up together in Hermosa Beach.

== Band history ==
Life was formed in Hermosa Beach, California in 2012, by all founding members of Tomorrows Bad Seeds, Moises Juarez, Sean Chapman and Matthew "Mets" McEwan. After years of touring and recording with Tomorrows Bad Seeds, the original members felt the need to branch out musically in a direction which had more "global appeal". Though grateful for what the reggae/rock scene had done for them, the band, however, felt they were growing and changing musically and so started their new project "LIFE"

After a chance meeting with Producer/Musical director, Michael Choi (aka Foolish Prophet) on Warped Tour in the lunch queue, they embarked on a year-long journey to write new material and develop a new sound for themselves, taking all their personal musical influences which ranged from punk rock to soul. The band signed with indie label Urbantone Group and launched with a premiere of their first single "R.U.D.W.N.?" via USA Today in March 2014. The single was soon followed by a 2nd track "Better Days", which was premiered by Yahoo! Music.

In June 2014, their first EP, R.U.D.W.N.? EP, was released. Containing 5 tracks, the EP was a mixture of various influences of the band members. Sebastian Mackay at Substream Magazine said "The end result is an EP will get into your marrow and have you innocently tapping along at one moment and singing your heart out the next". Substream also gave the EP a rare 5 stars. Gregory Robson at AbsolutePunk said of the EP "R U D W N? is a first-rate work from a band that deserves both wider appeal and wider recognition."

In July 2014, Life premiered the video to "Kids" on LA Magazine. The video was created by Clifford Cruz.

== R.U.D.W.N.? EP ==
Produced by Foolish Prophet, this first EP consists of 5 tracks:

- R.U.D.W.N.?
- Kill The Messenger
- Kids
- Better Days
- Burning Up

All the tracks were written by the band and Foolish Prophet with co-writes from Josiah Rosen and Emil Ogoo. Production started in May 2013, when Chapman suggested they should get a drummer like his hero, Josh Freese. The producer suggested asking "the man himself", so Freese became the main drummer on the EP, recording R.U.D.W.N.?, Kids and Better Days. The drums on Burning Up was recorded by the legendary drummer "JR" Robinson famed for his work with Quincy Jones and Michael Jackson. Finally, the drummer on Kill The Messenger was another legend Omar Hakim who was a particular hero to Foolish Prophet due to his wide ranging work with Miles Davis, Sting, Madonna, Daft Punk etc. On percussion was another legend Luis Conte, piano was Rachel Z (former keyboard player for Peter Gabriel) and horns were Nick Lane, Chuck Findley, Lee Thornburg, Tom Evans.

The EP launched on June 18, 2014 with a performance at The Roxy in West Hollywood.

== Future releases ==
The band recently recorded their next single with drummer José Pasillas from the band Incubus. Chapman had met Pasillas through Greg Teal at Hurley and became friends after their first jam session. Pasillas has also recorded 2 other tracks with the band.

== Band members ==
- Moises Juarez – lead vocals
- Sean Chapman – guitarist, backing vocals
- Matthew McEwan – guitarist, backing vocals

== Discography ==
- R.U.D.W.N.? EP (2014)
