= Swim Team (Dirty Heads album) =

Studio album by Dirty Heads
- Released: October 13, 2017
- Length: 35:00
- Label: Five Seven

Dirty Heads chronology
Dirty Heads (2017)	Swim Team (2017)	Super Moon (2019)

Singles from Swim Team
- 1. "Vacation" Released: June 30, 2017; 2. "Staloney" Released: September 1, 2017; 3. "Celebrate" Released: September 15, 2017; 4. "Visions" Released: June 15, 2018

Swim Team is the sixth studio album by American reggae rock band Dirty Heads. Released on October 13, 2017, the album was published by Five Seven Music. The ensemble completed their tour for the album with Tyrone's Jacket and The Unlikely Candidates. The special edition of the album was released on October 19, 2018 to include a single "Visions".

In early 2021, the song "Vacation" started to go viral on TikTok, appearing on many videos. Also, the song "Celebrate" was used during a video montage commemorating All Elite Wrestling's time taping Dynamite at Daley's Place in Jacksonville, Florida during the COVID-19 pandemic at the end of the June 30, 2021 episode.

== Track listing ==
No.	Title	Length
1.	"Staloney"	2:44
2.	"High Tea" (featuring Jordan Miller)	3:28
3.	"Mad at It"	3:16
4.	"Vacation"	3:29
5.	"Celebrate" (featuring The Unlikely Candidates)	3:16
6.	"Diamonds & Pearls"	3:20
7.	"Get Somewhere"	3:36
8.	"So Glad You Made It" (featuring Nick Hexum of 311)	2:58
9.	"God Damn Liar"	3:01
10.	"Lonely for Me"	2:52
11.	"West Coast"	3:02
Total length:		35:02

Special edition
No.	Title	Length
12.	"Visions"	3:53
13.	"Visions (featuring Chloe Chaidez)"	3:49
14.	"Visions (Dan the Automator Remix)"	3:49
15.	"Visions (David Foral, Jungle Josh and Aron Remix)"	3:34
16.	"Visions (Rome & Mohammed Al - Mubarak Remix)"	2:57

== Charts ==
=== Album ===
Chart (2017)	Peak position
US Billboard 200	35
US Top Alternative Albums (Billboard)	4
US Top Rock Albums (Billboard)	6

=== Singles ===
Title	Year	Peak chart positions
Title	Year	US Alt.
"Vacation"	2017	14
"Staloney"	2017	—
"Celebrate" (featuring The Unlikely Candidates)	2017	12
"Visions"	2018	19
