= Lay Me Down (The Dirty Heads song) =

- Promotional CD cover.

Single by Dirty Heads featuring Rome Ramirez

from the album Any Port in a Storm
- Released: 2010
- Recorded: 2009
- Studio: Hurley Studios
- Genre: Reggae rock
- Length: 3:35
- Label: Fontana; Universal
- Songwriters: Dirty Heads; Rome Ramirez
- Producers: The Dirty Heads; Rome Ramirez; Lewis Richards; Cameron Webb

The Dirty Heads singles chronology
| "Stand Tall" (2008) | "Lay Me Down" (2010) | "Check the Level" (2010) |

"Lay Me Down" is a 2010 single by reggae rock band Dirty Heads featuring Rome Ramirez of Sublime with Rome. The song appears as a bonus track on the band's album Any Port in a Storm, and has peaked at number one on the Billboard Alternative Songs chart.

== Critical reception ==
Billboard's Connor McKnight wrote in April 2010 that the song is a "solid contender" for song of the summer. McKnight compared the song's opening to that of "Hope" by Jack Johnson, and said the song "lifts the energy with chugging guitar riffs, a freewheeling chorus and feel-good lyrics delivered with rhythmic punch". David Hall of the Orange County Register listed it among the band's "positively charged, island-influenced tunes ... which ride on the coattails of similar acts like 311 and Slightly Stoopid". The song was included on Rolling Stone's "Hot List" in early 2010.

== Chart performance ==
In March, the single entered the Billboard Alternative Songs chart at number 24. It reached number one in May, and nine weeks later it established a record as the song with the longest stint atop the chart for an independently released title, surpassing the previous mark set in 1999 by Everlast's "What It's Like". "Lay Me Down" peaked at number 93 on the U.S. Hot 100 and number 76 on the Canadian Hot 100 chart. The Dirty Heads performed the song on Jimmy Kimmel Live! on May 13.

In late 2023, for the 35th anniversary of Alternative Songs (which by then had been renamed to Alternative Airplay), Billboard published a list of the top 100 most successful songs in the chart's history; "Lay Me Down" was ranked at number 39.

== Music video ==
The music video was directed by Thomas Mignone and filmed in various playa and mercado locations throughout Mexico. Filming was interrupted by border patrol agents objecting to the actors' portrayal of escaping across the United States and Mexico border. Bandmembers Dustin Bushnell and Jared Watson taught local mariachis the song and were filmed live for several of the scenes.

== Charts ==
=== Weekly charts ===
| Chart (2010) | Peak position |
|---|---|
| Canadian Hot 100 | 76 |
| U.S. Billboard Hot 100 | 93 |
| U.S. Billboard Alternative Songs | 1 |
| U.S. Billboard Rock Songs | 1 |
| U.S. Billboard Adult Top 40 | 37 |

=== Year-end charts ===
| Chart (2010) | Position |
|---|---|
| US Hot Rock Songs (Billboard) | 5 |

=== Decade-end charts ===
| Chart (2010–2019) | Position |
|---|---|
| US Hot Rock Songs (Billboard) | 29 |

== Certifications ==
| Region | Certification | Certified units/sales |
|---|---|---|
| United States (RIAA) | Platinum | 1,000,000^{‡} |
^{‡} Sales+streaming figures based on certification alone.

== Release history ==
Release dates and formats for "Lay Me Down"
| Region | Date | Format | Label(s) | Ref. |
|---|---|---|---|---|
| United States | June 8, 2010 | Mainstream airplay | Fontana | |

== See also ==
- List of number-one alternative rock singles of 2010 (U.S.)
- List of number-one rock singles (U.S.)
