= Super Moon (album) =

Studio album by Dirty Heads
- Released: August 9, 2019
- Studio: RCA Studio A (Nashville, Tennessee)
- Length: 32:55
- Label: Five Seven
- Producer: Dave Cobb

Dirty Heads chronology
Swim Team (2017)	Super Moon (2019)	Midnight Control (2022)

Singles from Super Moon
- 1. "Super Moon" Released: June 14, 2019; 2. "Lift Me Up" Released: July 5, 2019; 3. "Fear & Love" Released: August 9, 2019

Super Moon is the seventh studio album by American reggae rock band Dirty Heads, released on August 9, 2019.

== History ==
On June 14, 2019, Dirty Heads released "Super Moon", the first single and title track of their new album.

On July 5, the second single "Lift Me Up" was released.

== Track listing ==
No.	Title	Length
1.	"Super Moon"	3:25
2.	"Lift Me Up"	2:33
3.	"Tender Boy"	3:30
4.	"Horsefly"	4:23
5.	"Fear & Love"	2:57
6.	"Cloudlifter"	2:47
7.	"Come Back Around"	3:13
8.	"Lighthouse"	2:38
9.	"Crow Bar Hotel"	3:46
10.	"Slow Down"	3:43
Total length:		32:55

== Charts ==
Chart (2019)	Peak position
US Billboard 200	116
