= The Unlikely Candidates =

American band

- Origin: Keller, Texas, United States
- Genres: Pop rock; indie pop; indie rock; alternative rock; rock
- Years active: 2008–present
- Labels: Another Century, Atlantic
- Members: Kyle Morris; Cole Male; Brenton Carney; Jared Hornbeek; Josh Montez
- Past members: Josiah Maughan; Kevin Goddard
- Website: linktree.com/TheUnlikelyCandidates

The Unlikely Candidates are an American indie rock band from Keller, Texas, formed in 2008. The band consists of lead vocalist Kyle Morris, lead guitarist Brenton Carney, guitarist Cole Male, bassist Jared Hornbeek, and drummer Josh Montez. Their song "Novocaine" topped the Alternative Songs chart and has received over 66 million streams and video views as of July 2021. They were signed with Atlantic Records as of 2013, but switched to Another Century, a smaller label, in October 2016.

== Career ==
=== Early years and Follow My Feet (2008–2016) ===
The band was formed initially in 2008 by childhood friends Kyle Morris and Cole Male. After uniting in high school, the band immediately separated themselves from the typical musical traditions associated with Texas, and turned up with an alternative style of their own. However it wasn't until 2013 when they released their first music.

In April 2013, they released their debut single, "Follow My Feet." On September 30, 2013, they released their debut EP, also called Follow My Feet.

In March 2016, the band released an instrumental version of the EP. The cover art is the same as the original with inverted colors.

=== Bed of Liars and Danger to Myself (2016–2018) ===
Since the release of Follow My Feet, the band has released two more extended plays that feature a departure from the sound of Follow My Feet in 2017: Bed of Liars, which was released in February, and Danger to Myself, released in October. "Your Love Could Start a War" (Bed of Liars EP) was released in February 2016, and now has over 15 million worldwide streams. The song was their biggest success since "Follow My Feet" and made an appearance on the Billboard Alternative Songs chart. Shortly after the band switched record labels in October 2016, they released the song "Ringer." The EP Bed of Liars was released on February 17, 2017. A music video for "Ringer" was released on April 7, 2017, which is composed of different clips sent in from fans of the band around the world. The music video for "Violence" was released in July 2017.

According to Kyle Morris, songs like Ringer and Reaction were written in [guitarist Brenton Carney’s] house after being told that the band needed to write songs or else they might have gotten dropped from the label. The band spent a couple of weeks in California, and were partially influenced from West Coast-style rap while working on Bed of Liars. The band has logged countless miles on the road alongside artists such as Young the Giant, the Dirty Heads, Fall Out Boy, and Brick + Mortar.

The band's next EP, Danger to Myself, was released on October 27, 2017. It includes the song "Celebrate," an alternate version of a song by the Dirty Heads. The EP was re-released on January 12, 2018 to include a new song, "Oh My Dear Lord." This song eventually became another one of the band's notable hits and has over 13 million worldwide streams. A music video was released for the song in March 2018. Kyle Morris has said that the EP was primarily influenced from life on the road, and his experiences while touring in a band.

=== Panther Island (2018–2024) ===
On August 17, 2018, the Unlikely Candidates released the single "Best I Ever Had." It was followed by "Bells" on October 12, 2018. The latter song has been described as "dark-yet-catchy." They released the single "Strange Love" in February 2019. In March 2019, they released their breakout single "Novocaine", which quickly gained popularity, and is currently the band's biggest hit. On March 14, 2020, it reached #1 on the Alternative Songs chart. On the song, the band shared, “it’s sort of the celebration and lamentation of being a slacker. I think we all have that voice that wants to be lazy and avoid responsibility a little longer. So it’s about being okay with it and that lifestyle somewhat.” In later 2019 the band went on the Strange Lines tour with Brick + Mortar and the Brevet. The tour was named after what would have been the band's first studio album, due in Fall 2019, but the album ended up being scrapped.

A year later on April 16, 2020, they released a song called "Invincible." On May 29, 2020, the band released a new single titled "High Low". Frontman Kyle Morris said the song "is about isolation, loneliness, and longing for human connection". They released the music video for the song on October 7, 2020. On June 25, 2021, the band released another single called "Gemini".

In March 2022, it was officially announced that the band's debut studio album Panther Island would be released on May 20, 2022. A promotional single from the album, "Sunshine", was released on March 18, 2022. The second promotional single from the album, "How I Am", was released on April 22, 2022. The album has 11 tracks. On Christmas Day 2022 they released a music video for their song "Grenadine".

=== Possible second studio album (2024–present) ===
On December 9, 2024, drummer Kevin Goddard announced that he would be leaving the band to focus on his mental health and his family.

On March 14, 2025, the Unlikely Candidates released a new single called "Fingers Crossed", with a music video released on March 31.

== Influences ==
Morris once said that the band is usually influenced from bands that normally don't stick to one particular sound, like the Beatles or Blur. Their style of songwriting has been described as "grandiose, yet garage band-like." The band is also notable for straying from music styles typically associated with Texas, such as country music.

== Members ==
- Kyle Morris: lead vocals
- Brenton Carney: lead guitar
- Cole Male: backing guitar
- Jared Hornbeek: bass
- Josh Montez: Drums/ Percussion

=== Former members ===
- Josiah Maughan: bass
- Kevin Goddard: drums/percussion

== Discography ==
=== Albums ===
- Panther Island (2022)

=== Extended plays ===
- Follow My Feet (2013)
- Bed of Liars (2017)
- Danger to Myself (2017)

=== Singles ===
==== As lead artist ====
Title	Year	Peak chart positions				Album
Title	Year	US AAA	US Alt.	Mediabase Alt.	US Rock	Album
"Follow My Feet"	2013	6	35	35	— (Note: "Follow My Feet" did not chart on the Rock Songs chart but did peak at number 34 on the Rock Airplay chart.)	Follow My Feet EP
"Howl"	2013	—	—	85	—	Follow My Feet EP
"Your Love Could Start A War"	2016	—	36	36	— (Note: "Your Love Could Start a War" did not chart on the Rock Songs chart but did peak at number 50 on the Rock Airplay chart.)	Bed Of Liars EP
"Ringer"	2016	—	38	29	—	Bed Of Liars EP
"Violence"	2017	—	—	—	—	Bed Of Liars EP
"Oh My Dear Lord"	2018	—	—	50	—	Danger To Myself EP
"Best I Ever Had"	2018	—	—	—	—	Non-album singles
"Bells"	2018	—	—	—	—	Non-album singles
"Strange Love"	2019	—	—	—	—	Non-album singles
"Novocaine"	2019	37	1	1	5	Panther Island
"Invincible"	2020	—	—	—	—	Non-album single
"High Low"	2020	—	19	16	—	Panther Island
"Gemini"	2021	—	—	48	—	Panther Island
"Sunshine"	2022	—	—	—	—	Panther Island
"How I Am"	2022	—	—	—	—	Panther Island
"Fingers Crossed"	2025	—	—	—	—	TBA
"Steady As it Gets"	2026	—	—	—	—	TBA
"Roses"	2026	—	—	—	—	TBA
"LIL PSYCHO"	2026	—	—	—	—	TBA
"—" denotes a single that did not chart

==== As featured artist ====
Title	Year	Peak chart positions		Album
Title	Year	US Alt.	US Rock	Album
"Celebrate" (Dirty Heads featuring the Unlikely Candidates)	2017	12	31	Swim Team
"NeverEnding Nightmare" (Chad Tepper featuring the Unlikely Candidates)	2022	—	—	Non-album single
"—" denotes a single that did not chart or was not released in that territory.
