= Dirty Heads =

American reggae rock band

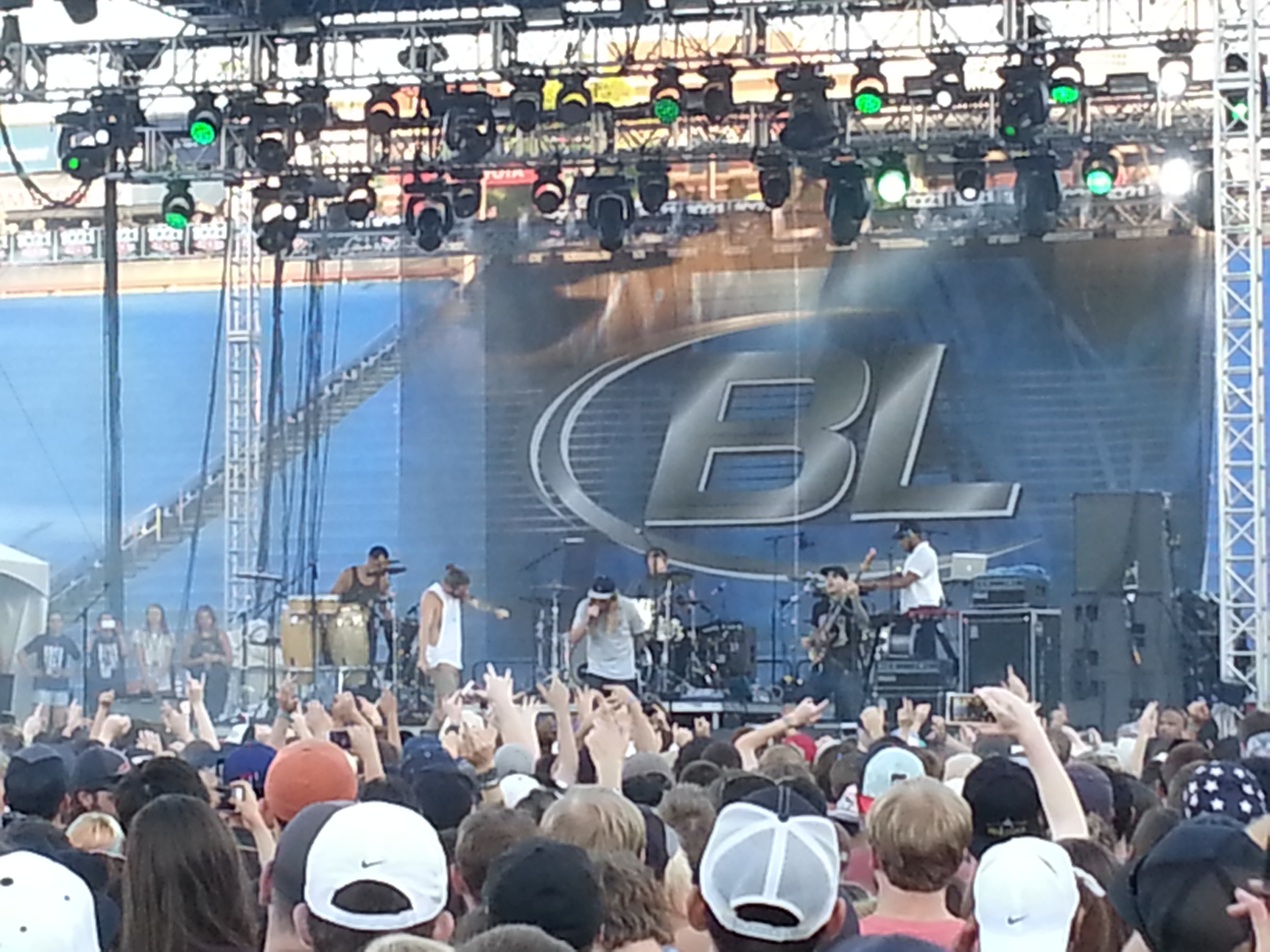
- Dirty Heads performing in 2015

Background information
- Origin: Huntington Beach, California, U.S.
- Genres: Alternative hip hop; acoustic rock; alternative rock; rap rock; reggae fusion; reggae rock; ska
- Years active: 2006–present
- Labels: Better Noise; Executive Music Group (EMG); Five Seven Music
- Members: Jared "Dirty J" Watson; Dustin "Duddy B" Bushnell; Jon Olazabal; Matt Ochoa; David Foral; Shawn Gonzalez
- Past members: Josh Freese
- Website: dirtyheads.com

Dirty Heads is an American reggae rock band from Huntington Beach, California. Their debut album, Any Port in a Storm, was released on September 23, 2008, by Executive Music Group (Fontana/Universal). Their latest album, 7 Seas, was released on June 12, 2026, by Better Noise Music. They have been associated with music groups such as Sublime with Rome, 311, and Pepper, and have toured with groups including Cobra Starship, Aer, and Gym Class Heroes.

== History ==
=== Early history/formation (1996–2006) ===
The band was founded in 1996 by Jared "Dirty J" Watson and vocalist/guitarist Dustin "Duddy B" Bushnell in Orange County, CA, drawing inspiration from the area's reggae and ska culture. The two first met at a party during their first year of high school. Upon hearing one of Bushnell's rap demo tapes, Watson became inspired to collaborate with him on a new project. Bushnell was already in a punk rock band at the time, while Watson had no previous music experience. In Bushnell's garage, the two began writing hip hop songs with reggae and punk influences. Before filling their current lineup, Watson and Bushnell would perform with Bushnell's older brother Jake Bushnell's band, HB Surround Sound. The band's name stems from their older brothers and family calling them "dirty heads" when they were younger.

In 2007, the newly formed band recorded their first demo album, Dirty Demo. It included seven tracks, with an additional song "Gimmie The Mic", listed on the back cover as 'track number 77'.

=== Any Port in a Storm (2008) ===
Percussionist Jon Olazabal and bassist David Foral were later added to the lineup. Record producer Rob Cavallo, the then-chief creative officer at Warner Bros., signed the band to Warner Music Group; however, artistic differences led them to leave the label. The band retained ownership of their master recordings, which make up the bulk of Any Port in a Storm, through the separation.

The band then connected with producers Steve Fox and Stan Frazier (drummer from Sugar Ray) to complete their debut album. The album features appearances from Beatles collaborator Billy Preston, Peruvian jazz percussionist Alex Acuna, Grammy Award-nominated British reggae singer and DJ Tippa Irie, and Indie 103.1 reggae host Native Wayne. The song "Check the Level" includes guitarist Slash and heavy metal vocalist M. Shadows. The album was mixed by Beastie Boys producer Mario C, and Lewis Richards of 17th Street Recording. During production of the album, drummer Matt Ochoa was not in the band and drummer of multiple known bands, including Sublime with Rome and Nine Inch Nails, Josh Freese stepped in to play drums.

The group first entered the rock/reggae scene when "Ring the Alarm" was chosen as a song on the first Pier Magazine Sampler.

The band started touring heavily in California, Arizona, and some parts of Mexico before becoming a national touring act. They maintain close ties with groups such as Sublime with Rome.

The Dirty Heads have toured the U.S. frequently with bands such as O.A.R., 311, Pepper, Kottonmouth Kings, Unwritten Law, Matisyahu, and Sublime with Rome.

The band has also been featured in marketing campaigns for Etnies, Rag Dynasty Shirts, and Vestal Watches. The Dirty Heads were among the first bands featured on YouTube's "RAWsession". The set included a cover of Coldplay's "Viva La Vida".

Their most successful single to date is "Lay Me Down", featuring vocalist/guitarist Rome Ramirez of Sublime With Rome. Produced by Stan Frazier and Steve Fox, the song was originally written by Bushnell and Ramirez in about four hours. The video was directed by Thomas Mignone and premiered on MTV on June 24, 2010. The song became the #1 Alternative hit after its release and remained #1 for more than 10 weeks.

=== Cabin by the Sea (2012) ===
On March 9, 2012, the song "Spread Too Thin", from their album Cabin by the Sea, premiered on L.A.'s KROQ. On the origins of the song, Watson commented, "In the music industry, there are ups-and-downs, and it's probably more emotionally stressful than physically. So I was talking to my dad, just about some stuff. I was a little stressed, and he has this funny saying. 'You're like a little bit of butter on too much bread.'"

Cabin by the Sea was released on June 19, 2012. The band played several music festivals during Summer 2012, including Catalpa Music Festival on Randalls Island in New York City.

The album featured artists such as Del the Funky Homosapien in the song "Smoke Rings", and Rome Ramirez in the song "Mongo Push".

=== Home – Phantoms of Summer (2013) ===
On July 9, 2013, The Dirty Heads released an acoustic version of the song "Cabin by the Sea", recorded with Thepier.org, as a part of their acoustic series. The album debuted at #27 on the Billboard 200 charts.

On July 28, 2013, The Dirty Heads played their largest sold-out show to date in front of 8,500 hometown friends, family, and fans at the Orange County Fair's Pacific Amphitheatre in Costa Mesa, California. The emotional stop on their "Cabin by the Sea Tour" ended with a "thank you" from the band for Orange County's longtime support.

The Dirty Heads released an 11-track acoustic album, titled Home – Phantoms of Summer, on October 29, 2013.

=== Sound of Change (2014) ===
On May 6, 2014, they released the first single, "My Sweet Summer", from their album Sound of Change, which was released on July 8, 2014. The album reached #2 on Top Rock Albums and reached #8 on the Billboard 200. The set also debuted at #1 on Alternative Albums, led by their single "My Sweet Summer".

In March 2015, Dirty Heads appeared on Blues Traveler's album Blow Up the Moon, co-writing the song "Castaway" and "Vagabond Blues" with Rome Ramirez.

=== Dirty Heads (self-titled album) (2016) ===
On April 20, 2016, a date chosen for its 4/20 significance, the first single, "That's All I Need" from their upcoming 2016 album was released. On July 15, 2016, the group released their self-titled album Dirty Heads.

=== Swim Team (2017) ===
On October 13, 2017, Dirty Heads released their sixth studio album, Swim Team. The album features The Unlikely Candidates on the song "Celebrate" and Nick Hexum of 311 on "So Glad You Made It".

=== Super Moon (2019) ===
On August 9, 2019, the band's seventh studio album Super Moon was released. It was produced by Dave Cobb. Jared "Dirty J" Watson describes as "a 70s sci-fi kung fu Western car chase soundtrack." Super Moon was recorded live in Studio A of the RCA building in Nashville, Tennessee, where Johnny Cash and Elvis Presley recorded much of their work. With the album release, they toured with 311 on the "2019 Unity Tour".

=== The Best of Dirty Heads (2021) ===
Dirty Heads' first greatest hits albums, The Best of Dirty Heads, was released on July 16, 2021. It includes new collaborations with Travis Barker of Blink-182, and Aimee Allen of The Interrupters.

=== Midnight Control (2022) ===
Dirty Heads recorded their eighth studio full-length album, titled, Midnight Control, which was released via Better Noise Music on August 26, 2022. It features cover art created by bassist David Foral and 2 singles; "Life's Been Good" (Joe Walsh cover) and "Heavy Water" with Grammy Award-nominated band Common Kings. "Heavy Water" is a song about empowerment", Jared Watson shared. "Being in the water constantly from a young age, we know the power of the ocean. There is nothing more powerful or uncontrollable. 'Heavy Water' is a metaphor for life because when life throws something at you that's unforeseen and uncontrollable, you will be ready for it and not let it overtake you."

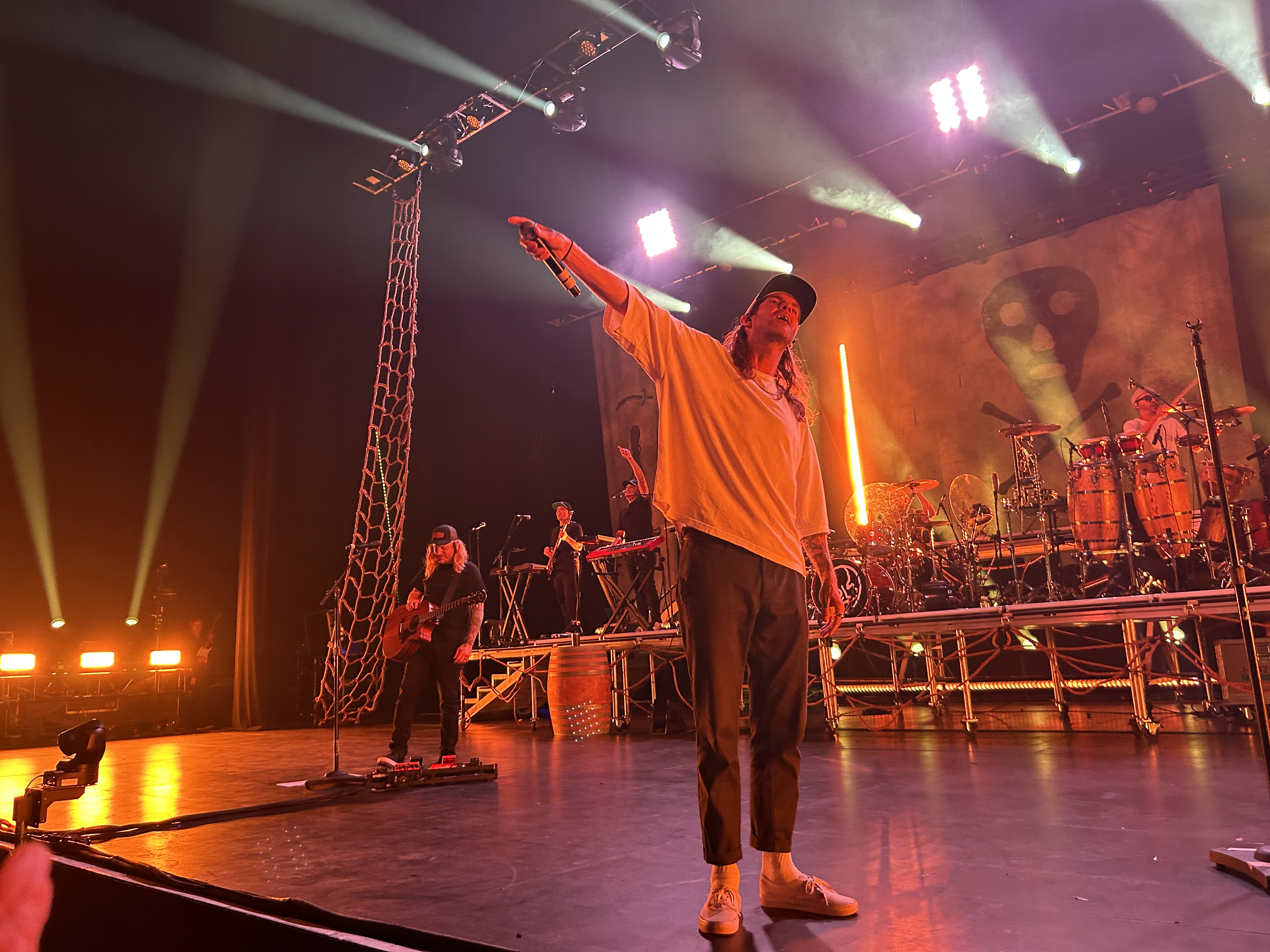
Jared "Dirty J" Watson performing with the Dirty Heads on their Island Glow tour at Ovation Hall in Atlantic City, July 22, 2023.

Jared also spoke about the meaning behind and the making of Midnight Control. "The album is the culmination of almost twenty years of musical exploration, creativity, and our love for creating original impactful art and music. It's the best album we've ever written, and I think that's due to the fact we have been through so much, done so much, and are comfortable as songwriters, producers, players and human beings."

=== Slightly Dirty Tour (2024) ===
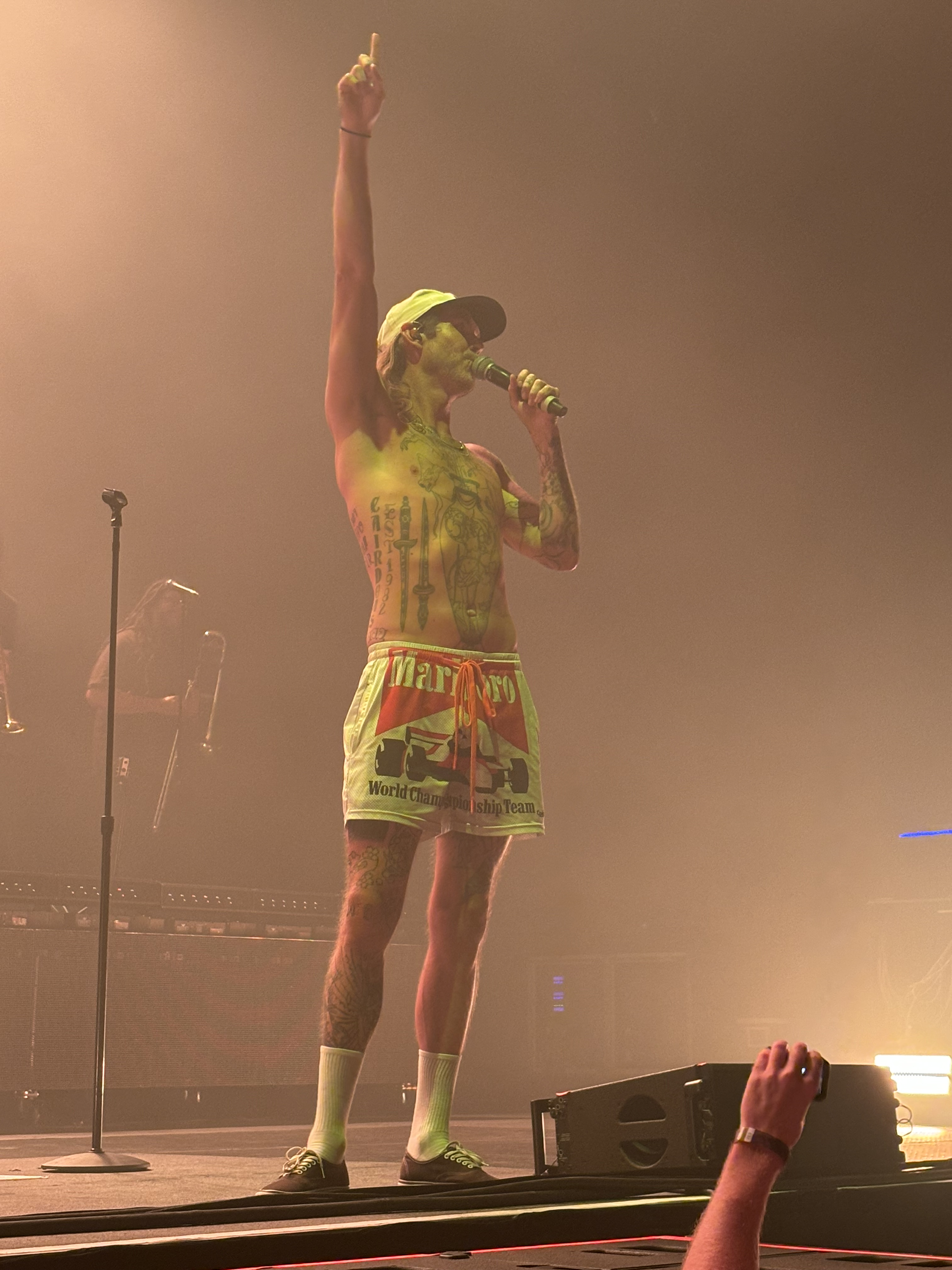
Jared Watson performs with Dirty Heads at the Freedom Mortgage Pavilion in Camden as part of the Slightly Dirty Tour. Watson has taken to wearing shorts for the first time on tour on some nights.

In July 2024, Dirty Heads and Slightly Stoopid co-headlined the Slightly Dirty Tour with support from The Elovaters, Common Kings, Passafire and Hirie. The highly anticipated tour began in Cleveland and runs through the Summer of 2024. Reviews of the tour were universally positive with crowd enthusiasm, a fantastic setlist and the energy of the bands being the driver behind the popular American Reggae bands' success.

=== 7 Seas (2026–present) ===
On February 13, 2026, Dirty Heads released their first single, Seven Seas. It is their first new song in nearly 4 years. On March 17, 2026, they released their second single, One Of Those Days. They announced their ninth studio album called 7 Seas. It will be released on June 12, 2026.

== Musical influences ==
In an interview, Nick Williams of The International Newsweekly of Music, Video and Home Entertainment asked whether the Dirty Heads' reggae-rock vibe is influenced by Sublime and if they considered the band an Influence. Jared "Dirty J" Watson replied: "I definitely do. We grew up listening to it. We came from the [Long Beach] area and knew a lot of the same people, but we're obviously much younger. We met [Sublime's] Eric [Wilson] and Brad [Nowell] a long time ago. Lewis Richards has produced our stuff. It's almost the same camp. But we are thinking forward. We're not trying to sound like a '90s band. We're still progressive in our music, even though we do have a vintage sound sometimes. The Black Keys inspire us to have warm sounds that have a lot of soul in it, but still be new and relevant."

== Other projects ==
Starting in 2017, Dirty Heads collaborated with Four Sons Brewing, a micro-brewing company in Huntington Beach, California to create a limited-edition "Session Ale" in a specially designed container featuring album cover art. Named after the band's song "Vacation", the beer is brewed with real pineapple.

== Members ==
Current members

- Jared "Dirty J" Watson – co-lead vocals (2006–present)
- Dustin "Duddy B" Bushnell – co-lead vocals, guitar (2006–present)
- Jon Olazabal – percussion (2006–present); drums (2006–2007)
- David Foral – bass (2006–present)
- Matt Ochoa – drums (2008–present)
- Shawn Gonzalez – keyboards, backing vocals (2012–present)
- Mark Bush - trumpet, backing vocals (2020–present)
- Ruben Durazo - trombone, backing vocals (2020–present)

Former members

- Josh Freese – drums (2007–2008)
- DJ Rocky Rock – turntables (2006-2011)

== Discography ==
- Any Port in a Storm (2008)
- Cabin by the Sea (2012)
- Home – Phantoms of Summer (2013)
- Sound of Change (2014)
- Dirty Heads (2016)
- Swim Team (2017)
- Super Moon (2019)
- Midnight Control (2022)
- 7 Seas (2026)
