= Reggae rock =

Music genre

- Stylistic origins: Reggae; rock; reggae fusion; ska; rocksteady
- Cultural origins: 1970s, Jamaica, United Kingdom and United States
- Typical instruments: Bass; drums; guitar; brass instrument; sampler; keyboard

Subgenres
- Reggae punk

Other topics
- List of reggae rock artists; 2 tone; ska punk; third wave ska; lovers rock

Reggae rock, also known as Cali reggae, is a subgenre of reggae fusion and rock music that primarily features the reggae, rock, and ska genres. Typical lyrics of reggae rock songs incorporate love, personal awareness, and life challenges while incorporating music and beat elements of rock, punk, and hip-hop. The term "reggae rock" has been used to categorize artists such as Eddy Grant, and bands like The Police, Men at Work, Sublime & Sublime with Rome, No Doubt, Pepper, Slightly Stoopid, the Expendables, Iration, Dirty Heads, Rebelution, 311, SOJA, Big Sugar, and, to some extent, heavier bands such as Bad Brains.

Among the earliest examples of the genre are the 1972 songs "D'yer Mak'er" and "C Moon" by the British rock bands Led Zeppelin and Paul McCartney and Wings, respectively.

The term "reggae metal" has been used to describe bands that combine reggae rock with heavy metal, such as Dub War, Shinobi Ninja, Skindred, Twelve Foot Ninja, and Zeroscape. Reggae rock found its rise in popularity in the 1990s in Long Beach, California, with the band Sublime. The genre has lately found a boost in popularity with the 2010 song "Lay Me Down" by the Dirty Heads featuring Rome Ramirez from Sublime with Rome, which peaked at number 1 on both the US Billboard Alternative Songs and Rock Songs charts.

With reggae rock rising in popularity, the genre was included in the inaugural California Roots Music & Arts Festival in 2010.
