= Rome Ramirez =

American musician (born 1988)

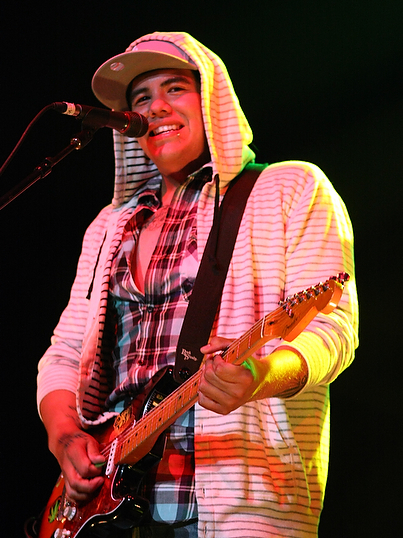
- Ramirez performing with Sublime with Rome in 2010

Background information
- Also known as: Rome
- Born: Roman Rene Ramirez; June 11, 1988 (age 38); Fremont, California, U.S.
- Genres: Ska punk; reggae rock; dub; reggae; rap rock; alternative rock; rapcore; garage rock; pop rock; punk rock
- Occupations: Musician; record producer; guitarist; songwriter
- Instruments: Vocals; guitar
- Years active: 2008–present
- Formerly of: Sublime with Rome
- Spouse: Taylor Faye Ramirez

Roman Rene Ramirez (born June 11, 1988) is an American singer and guitarist best known for playing with Eric Wilson and Bud Gaugh from Sublime in the band Sublime with Rome.

== Early life ==
Roman Rene Ramirez was born and raised in Fremont, California on June 11, 1988. Both of his parents are of Mexican heritage, his mother being from Guadalajara and his father's parents from Tijuana, He first started playing guitar at age 11, and one of the first songs he learned was a Sublime song.

At 18, Ramirez headed to Los Angeles to focus full-time on music. There, he was introduced to one of his idols, Eric Wilson, bassist for Sublime. They became friends and started jamming together at Eric's infamous holiday parties in Long Beach. Within the year, the plan to bring back Sublime had been set into motion.

== Sublime With Rome ==
In 2008, Rome collaborated with Eric Wilson on a RAWsession video (also at 17th Street Recording Studio) where he played Sublime songs such as "Saw Red" and "Boss DJ", and eventually began to play with the band's two surviving members, Eric and Bud Gaugh.

The trio then went on tour together playing covers of original Sublime material. Sublime with Rome made its debut in 2009 at Cypress Hill's Smoke Out Festival in San Bernardino, California. Ramirez was soon touring steadily with Sublime with Rome, and the trio released their debut album Yours Truly on July 12, 2011. Gaugh performed his last show with the band on December 10, 2011. Over the next twelve years, the band performed with several different drummers, releasing an additional two albums.

On December 11, 2023, Wilson and Gaugh reunited to perform with Jakob Nowell as Sublime during a benefit show for Bad Brains vocalist H.R. at the Teragram Ballroom in Los Angeles. One week later, on December 18, Ramirez announced that he would be departing Sublime with Rome at the end of 2024 and moving on to focus on his solo career. The next day, Ramirez announced that the band had to postpone their scheduled 2023 performances in New Zealand due to "unforeseen circumstances" but promised to reschedule the dates for 2024. On February 26, 2024, Eric Wilson made an Instagram post announcing his immediate departure from Sublime with Rome. After releasing their self-titled album on May 10, 2024, the band ultimately split up by the end of the year.

== Songwriting and producing ==
Rome Ramirez has contributed extensively to songwriting and production across a range of artists and genres, blending influences from reggae rock, alternative, hip-hop, and pop. He co-wrote the song "Lay Me Down" with The Dirty Heads, which became a breakout hit and reached No. 1 on the Billboard Alternative Songs chart. He continued collaborating with the band on several of their albums, including Sounds of Change, Dirty Heads, Dessert EP, and Swim Team.

Outside of the reggae and rock scenes, Ramirez contributed to Enrique Iglesias's tenth studio album, providing songwriting support. He also worked with Selena Gomez on her 2013 album Stars Dance, contributing both songwriting and guitar work.

In 2015, Ramirez co-wrote "Castaway" and "Vagabond Blues" with The Dirty Heads for Blues Traveler’s collaborative album Blow Up the Moon.

Ramirez premiered his debut solo single, "Dedication," on May 30, 2012, via the Rolling Stone website. He described the track as being about "loving someone who is struggling with getting their life together and eventually having to move on," calling it one of the most personal songs he had written. His debut solo EP, also titled Dedication, was released on June 12, 2012.

== Influences ==
Ramirez has cited a wide range of musical influences that span multiple genres, including reggae, punk, hip-hop, and rock. His stated influences include:

- Sublime
- Muse
- Jimi Hendrix
- Bad Brains
- Nirvana
- Led Zeppelin
- Public Enemy
- Beastie Boys
- Primus

== Discography ==
=== Solo releases ===
==== Extended plays ====
- Dedication (2012)

==== Singles ====
- "Dedication" (2012)
- "Why Me?"
- "Forever"
- "The Money" (featuring Juando)
- "Normal" (featuring Jelly Roll)
- "Trenches" (featuring y0ungdd)
- "Chronos" (featuring Rome)
- "Tangerine Skies"
- "Love Is Dangerous"
- "All I Need"
- "Wicked Heart"
- "Light On"
- "Battle Scar"
- "Been Losing Sleep"
- "Brazila"
- "House Party"
- "Promise Land Dub"
- "Sirens"
- "Blackout"
- "Blessings"
- "For the Night"
- "Goodbyes"
- "May Day"
- "Spiderweb"
- "Thank U"
- "Wild Fire"
- "Can You Feel It"
- "Lover’s Rock"
- "Murdera"
- "My World"
- "Only"
- "PCH"
- "Paper Cuts"
- "Safe and Sound"
- "Same Old Situation"
- "Spun"
- "Take It or Leave It"
- "Your Better Listen"
- "Eighteen"
- "Oz of Love"
- "Hung Up"

==== Live recordings ====
- "Santeria" (live)
- "Skankin’ to the Beat" (live)
- "Wherever You Go" (live)

=== With Sublime with Rome ===
- Yours Truly (2011)
- Sirens (2015)
- Blessings (2019)
- Sublime with Rome (2024)

=== Charted singles ===
Title	Year	Artist	Album	US Alt.	US Rock	US Hot 100	Notes
"Lay Me Down"	2010	The Dirty Heads featuring Rome Ramirez	Any Port in a Storm	1	1	93	11 weeks at No. 1 on US Alt chart
"Panic"	2011	Sublime with Rome	Yours Truly	4	10	—	Debut single
"Take It or Leave It"	2011	Sublime with Rome	Yours Truly	32	—	—	—
"Wherever You Go"	2015	Sublime with Rome	Sirens	17	—	—	—
"Wicked Heart"	2018	Sublime with Rome	Blessings	34	—	—	—

=== Songwriting and collaborations ===
==== With The Dirty Heads ====
- "Lay Me Down" (co-writer)
- Sounds of Change (2014)
- Dirty Heads (2016)
- Dessert EP (2017)
- Swim Team (2017)

==== With Blues Traveler ====
- "Castaway" (co-writer)
- "Vagabond Blues" (co-writer)
- Blow Up the Moon (2015)

==== Other songwriting credits ====
- Contributions to Enrique Iglesias's tenth studio album
- Songwriting and guitar on Selena Gomez’s album Stars Dance (2013)
