= Five Seven Music =

- Parent company: Eleven Seven Music
- Founded: 2009
- Founder: Allen Kovac
- Distributors: Universal Music Group; RED Distribution
- Genre: Alternative rock
- Country of origin: United States
- Location: New York City, New York and Los Angeles, California
- Official website: FiveSevenMusic.com

Five Seven Music is the alternative/indie sub-label under The Eleven Seven Music Group.

Five Seven Music launched with Jet's Shaka Rock in 2009 followed by She Wants Revenge's Valleyheart in 2011. The label has rapidly grown since and has also released new albums from Dirty Heads, Shiny Toy Guns, Nico Vega and Midi Matilda, with more on the way and others to be announced.

== Current artist roster ==
- Attica Riots
- Bleeker
- Dark Waves
- Dirty Heads
- Just Loud
- NEVRLANDS
- Nico Vega
- ROMES
- Lower Than Atlantis

== See also ==
- List of record labels
