= Kaleo Wassman =

American singer

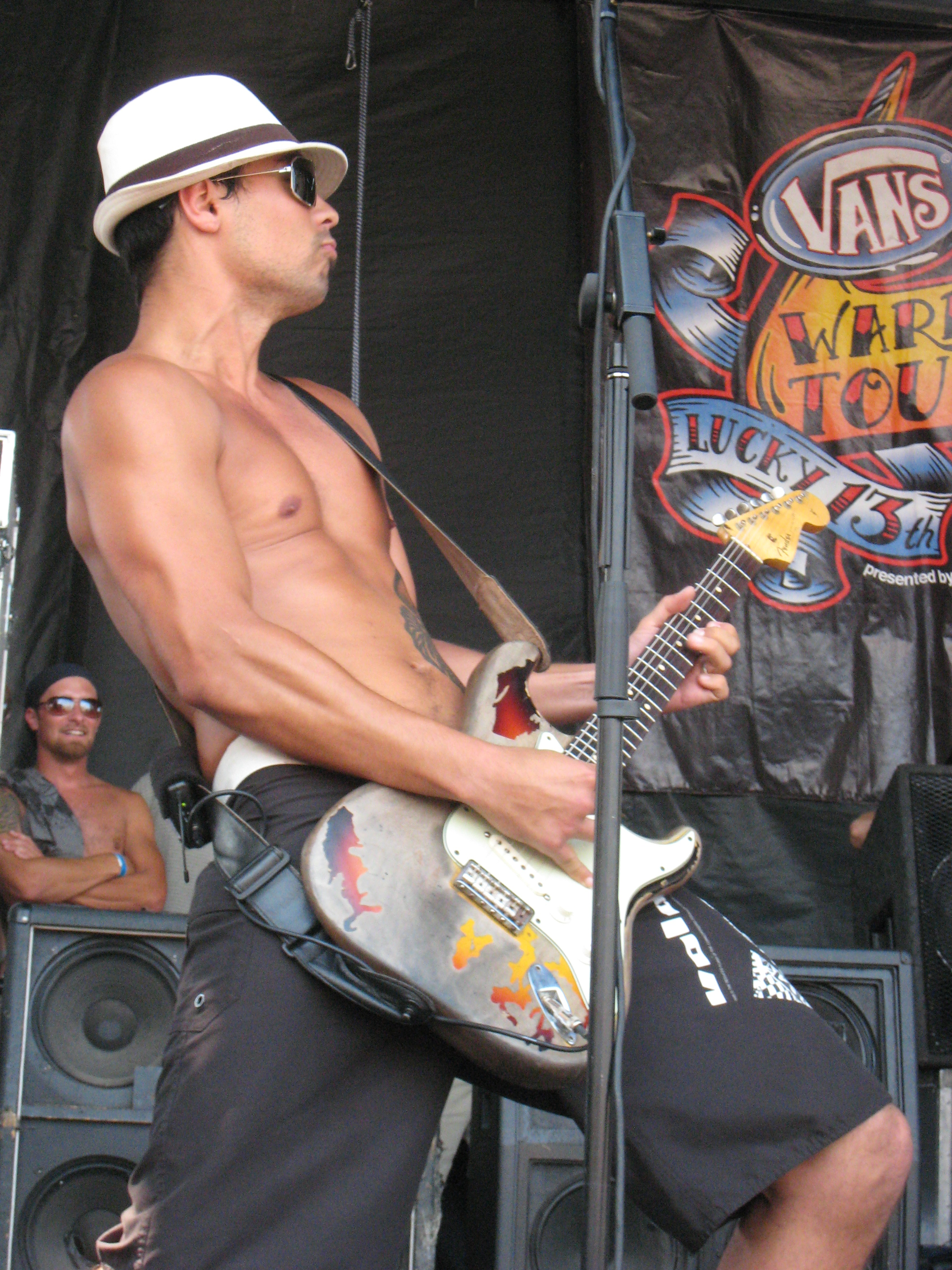
- Wassman in August 2007

Background information
- Born: Kaleo Kalani Wassman; January 6, 1978 (age 48); Kailua-Kona, Hawaii, United States
- Genres: Ska punk, Alternative rock, Reggae, Dub
- Occupations: Singer, Guitarist, Songwriter
- Instruments: Vocals, Guitar
- Years active: 1997–present
- Labels: LAW Records; Volcom Entertainment
- Member of: Pepper; Sabotage Soundsystem
- Website: pepperlive.com

Kaleo Kalani Wassman (born January 6, 1978) is an American musician who serves as the lead singer and guitarist of reggae, dub bands Pepper and Sabotage Soundsystem.

== Early life ==
Wassman was born in Kailua-Kona on the Big Island of Hawaii. In 1996, he started working with fellow bandmembers and bassist Brett Bollinger and Yesod Williams. The three of them have been friends since high school and started the band shortly after graduating. Kaleo said in an interview, "Everyone went to college and we went to the bars."

== Career ==
=== Pepper ===
In 1999, his newly formed band, with friends Bret Bollinger and Yesod Williams, relocated to SoCal to pursue their interest in reggae music and get signed by a major label. After releasing the band's debut demo Give'n It in 2000, Pepper were signed by Volcom Entertainment. After signing in 2000, the band performed in their first major show at the Warped Tour in 2001.

Following the Warped Tour, Wassman and his bandmates quickly hit the studio to produce their first album under Volcom. This was done with the help of Less Than Jake and blink-182 producer Steve Kravac. The album was completed by early 2002, and on March 26, 2002, the band's first album Kona Town was released.

Some of Wassman and Pepper's songs started to appear on various Volcom compilations, as early as 1999 with Summer Sampler and The Early Poems Of. After Volcom released Kona Town in 2002, Wassman and Pepper went on a few tours before returning to the studio. In with the Old followed in 2004, and Pepper started touring with the likes of 311 and Snoop Dogg.

Wassman and the band decided to leave Volcom and they began their own record label, LAW Records. Its first release was a re-issue of their 2000 demo Give'n It in 2003. A live DVD was issued in early 2006 before Pepper returned that fall with the studio album No Shame in 2006. After this Wassman and his bandmates began a subsequent tour alongside Slightly Stoopid and also appeared at the Warped Tour in 2007. After finishing this tour, Pepper returned to the studio and released Pink Crustaceans and Good Vibrations on July 22, 2008.

=== Sabotage Soundsystem ===
Kaleo and fellow surfer-musician Remy “Dub” DeRochemont also from Kona, started collaborating in 1999. After releasing many EPs and demos as well as doing many live shows, the band signed to Volcom Entertainment. Sabotage Soundsystem released their seventeen track debut album on February 17, 2009, entitled The Boto Machine Gun.

== Personal life ==
Kaleo has been married to Melanie Wassman for more than 15 years. They met, as Kaleo describes, “midair, deep in the cut”, while hang gliding.
