= Manntis =

American band

- Origin: Riverside, California, United States
- Genres: Metalcore; Melodic metalcore
- Years active: 2000–present
- Labels: Century Media
- Members: Jake Sirokman; Adair Cobley; Dan "DeeRock" Racadio; Clint Gregory; Jimmie Sanders
- Past members: Jeremy Swanson; Gus Rios; Joshua Feathers; Andre Morales

Manntis is an American metalcore band.

== History ==
Manntis originally formed in 2000 as a four-piece group. The band gathered mainstream attention in 2004 when they were one of the contestants on MTV's Battle for Ozzfest. Their lead guitarist, Adair Cobley, was picked as the representative for the band on the show. Ultimately, Manntis finished in third place (behind Curse Your Name and eventual winners A Dozen Furies).

On April 1, 2005, it was announced that the band signed a worldwide deal with Century Media Records. Their debut album Sleep in Your Grave was released on June 28, 2005. The tracks "Axe of Redemption" and "Weathered Souls" were released as singles, with music videos accompanying each.

The band announced that their next album, tentatively titled Master of Ceremonies, was due for a 2007 release, but that did not happen. Despite being mostly inactive since the announced hiatus, the band created a Facebook page in 2013, and continue to play a small number of charity shows and one-off events around California.

== Members ==
=== Current ===
- Jake Sirokman – vocals
- Jimmie Sanders – drums
- Adair Cobley – lead guitar, backing vocals
- Dan "DeeRock" Racadio – rhythm guitar, backing vocals
- Clint Gregory – bass

=== Former ===
- Gus Rios – drums
- Jeremy Swanson – guitar
- Joshua Feathers – drums
- Andre Morales – drums
- Marco Gomez - vocals

== Discography ==
- Dark Session - (2001)
- A Killing Time (2003)
- Sleep in Your Grave (2005)
- Master of Ceremonies (unreleased)

== Other sources ==
- "Jake Daniels, Adair Cobley & Clint Grego - (Manntis)". Metal-temple.com.
- "Jake Sirokman of Manntis | Ep. 255". September 2, 2024 – via YouTube.
- "Manntis Vocalist Jake Sirokman". Metal-rules.com. July 9, 2005.
- "MANNTIS - Master Of Ceremonies Official Music Video". February 16, 2014 – via YouTube.
- "MANNTIS - Axe Of Redemption (OFFICIAL VIDEO)". July 19, 2006 – via YouTube.
- "MANNTIS - Weathered Soul (OFFICIAL VIDEO)". July 19, 2006 – via YouTube.
