= To Da Max =

To Da Max - Mistakes and Outtakes (1997-2004)

Compilation album by Pepper
- Released: March 20, 2007
- Label: Volcom Entertainment

Pepper chronology
No Shame (2006)	To Da Max - Mistakes and Outtakes (1997-2004) (2007)	Pink Crustaceans and Good Vibrations (2008)

Professional ratings
Review scores
Source	Rating
Allmusic	Not rated link

To Da Max - Mistakes and Outtakes (1997-2004) is a compilation album by the band Pepper, composed of B-sides, demos, and live performances.

== Track listing ==
1. The Arena (2000)
2. New Beef (2001)
3. Green Hell (Live) (2001)
4. Armagideon Time (Live) (2002)
5. Good Enough (Demo) (2003)
6. Too Much (Demo) (2001)
7. Blunt (1997)
8. Stormtrooper (Demo) (2001)
9. Wasting Time (2000)
10. Dust On My Shoes (2001)
11. Peanuts (2000)
12. Danger, Danger (2003)
13. New Sunday (2000)
14. Lie Rumor Lie (2000)
15. Lost (2000)
16. 2B (2004)
17. Point and Shoot (Demo) (2003)
18. Lucy (Demo) (2003)
19. Medley (2005)
20. Give It Up (Demo) (2001)
