= Prove It =

Prove It may refer to:

- Prove It (album), an album by The Expendables
- "Prove It" (Television song), 1977
- "Prove It" (21 Savage and Summer Walker song), 2024
- "Prove It", a song by Randie Evretts and Horace Ott (appears on album Aretha Arrives)
- "Prove It", a song by Jolin Tsai for the 2003 album Magic
- "Prove It", a song by the Bicycles for the 2008 album Oh No, It's Love
- "Prove It", a song by Poppy for the 2023 album Zig
- Prove It!, an English educational children's TV series
- Prove It (horse), American Thoroughbred racehorse
- "Prove It," a 1999 episode from the 4th season of the Arthur TV series
- PROVE IT Act

== See also ==
- Wikipedia:ProveIt
