= Becoming I =

Studio album by Ünloco
- Released: March 11, 2003
- Recorded: 2002
- Studio: Third Stone Studios (North Hollywood, Los Angeles, California)
- Genre: Nu metal, alternative metal
- Length: 42:44
- Label: Maverick
- Producer: Mudrock

Ünloco chronology
Healing (2001)	Becoming I (2003)

Singles from Becoming I
- 1. "Failure" Released: March 11, 2003

Professional ratings
Review scores
Source	Rating
AllMusic	3/5 stars
Sputnikmusic	3.5/5 stars

Becoming I (stylized in all lowercase) is the second and final studio album by the American nu metal band Ünloco. The album was released on March 11, 2003, via Maverick. Produced by Andrew Murdock, the band's sound took an unexpected, somber turn toward a more melodic, metal-acoustic style. The second offering included two acoustic tracks — "Watching Me Slip" and "Texas". Sonically, the new style combined screams with resolute, poetic candour, surprising old and new fans alike.

Despite positive reviews from critics and the promotional support of their label — with appearances at Ozzfest 2003, Music as a Weapon II, and a tour with Korn — the album failed to meet commercial expectations and the band disbanded later the same year (and would not reform until 2014).

"Failure" served as the album's single and had a music video which gained minimal airplay. The song "Bruises" is featured in the True Crime: Streets of L.A. soundtrack as well as The Matrix Reloaded soundtrack. The song "Crashing" was featured on Madden NFL 2004. A live version of the song, as well as "Empty", was included on the Music as a Weapon II CD in February 2004.

== Track listing ==
All tracks are written by Ünloco (Joey Dueñas, Pedro Navarrete, Victor Escareño, and Marc Serrano).

No.	Title	Length
1.	"Crashing"	3:22
2.	"Failure"	3:19
3.	"Hands and Knees"	3:19
4.	"Empty"	3:15
5.	"Bruises"	2:36
6.	"Drowning in It"	3:16
7.	"Watching Me Slip"	4:07
8.	"Becoming I"	5:27
9.	"Fold"	4:13
10.	"Neurotic"	3:29
11.	"Making Me Hate You"	2:55
12.	"Texas"	3:24
Total length:		42:44

== Personnel ==
Ünloco

- Joey Dueñas – vocals, acoustics
- Marc Serrano – guitars
- Victor Escareño – bass guitar
- Pedro Navarrete – drums

Additional personnel

- Mudrock – producer, mixing, engineer
- Fred Archambault - engineer
- Ted Regier – mixing assistant
- Justin Walden – drum programming and keyboards (1, 3, 4, 6, 9, 10)
- Scott Gilman – drum programming, keyboards, flute, and occasional guitar (2, 5, 7–9, 11, 12)
- Mark Renk – vocal guru
- Mike Fasano – drum tech
- Stephen Ferrera-Grand – guitar tech
