= Redeye Empire =

Canadian reggae rock band

- Origin: Vancouver, British Columbia, Canada
- Genres: rock, reggae
- Years active: 2006–present
- Members: Gabe Davis; Mike Redmond; Eric Stephenson; Jay Leonard Juatco; Ryan Davis
- Past members: Andre Arsenault; Ben Brown; Ali Siadat
- Website: www.redeyeempire.ca

Redeye Empire was a reggae rock band from Vancouver, British Columbia, Canada.

== History ==
=== Formation and Redeye album (2006) ===
Redeye Empire was formed in the spring of 2006, inspired by musical influences which include Sublime, Jack Johnson and the Red Hot Chili Peppers.

The first members included Gabe Davis who after seeing G. Love in concert in 2001 and was inspired to learn guitar and start a band. He started a project with Mike Redmond, who was a friend he had known since elementary school. They decided to write and record a few catchy songs they collaborated on and completed the recording of their first raw album before ever stepping foot onto a stage together. Without any formal background studying music, they mostly played on open mic nights and local bars. They added a few more band members: brothers, Micah and Jory Groberman and called themselves Davis Trading.

Through the years of performing with Davis Trading, Gabe was thriving on the Vancouver live music scene and shared the stage with many musicians. As such, he developed a network of skilled players to perform on a recording, including three members from a popular funk instrumental electronic band called, The Masses. Ben Finkleman (producer and keyboard), Ali Siadat (drums), and Eric Stephenson (bass) would form the rhythm section. And after getting a melodic presence in Andre "Stretch" Arsenault, the band was now complete and would be the formation of Redeye Empire. They released their debut full-length album Redeye in 2006.

=== The Diary of Everett Miley (2008) ===
The band toured with G. Love & Special Sauce in 2007 and again in 2010, playing venues such as The Vic Theater in Chicago, House of Blues Orlando in Lake Buena Vista, Florida and Stubbs BBQ in Austin, Texas.

In early 2008, they toured with former Warped Tour headliners Pepper, as well as Iration.

The follow-up, The Diary of Everett Miley was released in 2008. It was created with producers Chris D. and Ben Kaplan. The Vancouver Province called the album, "modern pop awareness [with] an occasional ska influence... but...firmly reggae."

=== Sea to Sky (2010) ===
Redeye Empire embarked on a second tour with G. Love & Special Sauce in February 2010 to promote their third studio album, titled Sea to Sky. The band played venues across the United States in the south and on the west coast, including House of Blues in New Orleans, Dallas, San Diego and Los Angeles, as well as The Fillmore in San Francisco, California.

Redeye Empire also played various venues and festivals in 2010 including The WestBeach Festival in Santa Barbara, California on September 24.

=== Last Chance For Sunshine (2011) ===
Redeye Empire's fourth album Last Chance For Sunshine was released on July 1, 2011. It consists of 11 tracks produced by Ben Kaplan and Shawn "Doctor Boss" Cole (Bend Sinister, We Say Party!, Jackfruit). After promoting the album and touring for several more years, the band went on hiatus.

=== Vernon Grant Chronicles (2020) ===
The band's fifth album Vernon Grant Chronicles was released on January 20, 2020. The band announced via their website that this would be their final "farewell" album.

Throughout Redeye Empire's 15-plus years as a band, they have toured and shared the stage with the likes of G. Love & Special Sauce, Slightly Stoopid, The English Beat, Michael Franti, SOJA, Pepper, Iration, Fishbone, Arrested Development, Xavier Rudd, Rebelution, Dirty Heads, and Sublime With Rome, among other bands.

== Members ==
=== Current ===
- Gabe Davis – vocals, guitars
- Mike Redmond – vocals, guitars
- Eric Stephenson – bass
- Jay Leonard Juatco – lead guitar
- Ryan Davis – drums

=== Former ===
- Andre Arsenault – lead guitar
- Ben Brown – keyboards
- Ali Siadat – drums

== Discography ==
- Redeye (2006)
- The Diary of Everett Miley (2008)
- Sea to Sky (2010)
- Last Chance For Sunshine (2011)
- Vernon Grant Chronicles (2020)
