= Dress to Kill =

Dress to Kill may refer to:

- Dress to Kill (Eddie Izzard), a 1998 stand-up comedy performance video by Eddie Izzard
- Dress to Kill (2Cents album), 2009
- Dress to Kill (After School album), 2014
- Dress to Kill (ExWhyZ album), 2024

== See also ==
- Dressed to Kill (disambiguation)
