= Kaleo =

Kaleo may refer to:

== People ==
=== Given name ===
- Kaleo Kanahele (born 1996), American Paralympic volleyballist
- Kaleo La Belle, film director
- Kaleo Wassman (born 1977), American musician

=== Middle name ===
- Kurt Scott Kaleo Moylan (born 1939), Guamanian politician, first elected Lieutenant Governor of Guam

=== Surname ===
- Jatoe Kaleo (1928–1998), Ghanaian traditional ruler, politician and government minister
- John Kaleo (born 1971), American football quarterback

== Fictional characters ==
- Detective Kaleo, a character that appeared in season 1 of Hawaii Five-0
- Kaleo, one of the eldest vampires in Shattered Mirror

== Other uses ==
- Kaleo, Ghana, a small town in the Nadowli district of the Upper West Region of Ghana
- Kaleo (band), an Icelandic band
