= Kona Town =

Kona Town may refer to:

- Kona Town (album), by Pepper
- Kailua-Kona, Hawaii, an unincorporated community
