= Dressed to Kill =

Dressed to Kill may refer to:

== Books ==
- Dressed to Kill (novel), or Night Club, a 1945 novel by Peter Cheyney
- Dressed to Kill (book), a 1995 book by Sydney Ross Singer and Soma Grismaijer

== Film ==
- Dressed to Kill (1928 film), an American silent film starring Mary Astor
- Dressed to Kill (1941 film), an American crime film starring Lloyd Nolan
- Dressed to Kill (1946 film), a Sherlock Holmes film starring Basil Rathbone and Nigel Bruce
- Dressed to Kill (1980 film), an American thriller directed by Brian De Palma

== Music ==
- Dressed to Kill (album), by Kiss, 1975
- "Dressed to Kill" (song), by Preston, 2009; covered by Cher, 2013
- "Dressed to Kill", a song by Lita Ford from Dancin' on the Edge, 1984
- "Dressed to Kill", a song by Nazareth from The Fool Circle, 1981
- "Dressed to Kill", a song by New Found Glory from New Found Glory, 2010
- "Dressed to Kill", a song by the Nolans, 1983
- "Dressed to Kill", a song by Sharon Needles from PG-13, 2010
- "Dressed to Kill", a song by Symphony X from The Damnation Game, 1995

== Television episodes ==
- "Dressed to Kill" (The Avengers), 1963
- "Dressed to Kill" (Forensic Files), 2003
- "Dressed to Kill" (Frankie Drake Mysteries), 2018
- "Dressed to Kill" (Jack Ryan), 2019
- "Dressed to Kill" (My Life as a Teenage Robot), 2003

== See also ==
- Dressed to Kill Tour (disambiguation)
- Dress to Kill (disambiguation)
