= Iration (album) =

Studio album by Iration
- Released: May 18, 2018
- Genre: Reggae; Reggae Rock
- Length: 62:35
- Label: Three Prong Records
- Producer: David Manzoor

Iration chronology
Double Up (2016)	Iration (2018)	Coastin' (2020)

Iration is the sixth studio album by the American reggae band Iration, released on May 18, 2018.

== Track listing ==
=== CD release ===
All tracks are written by Iration, except where noted.

No.	Title	Length
1.	"Already Gold"	4:21
2.	"Press Play"	4:11
3.	"Twisted Up"	3:42
4.	"Broken Promises (feat. Slightly Stoopid)"	3:43
5.	"2GÜD2BTRÜ"	4:10
6.	"Danger" (feat. J Boog and Tyrone's Jacket)	3:59
7.	"Losing My Mind"	3:42
8.	"Stay The Course"	4:37
9.	"Know Your Name"	3:01
10.	"Last to Know"	3:41
11.	"Energy"	4:55
12.	"Hit List"	3:23
13.	"Borderlines"	3:08
14.	"Fly With Me"	4:13
15.	"Warm Waters"	3:52
16.	"All For You"	3:59
Total length:		62:35

=== LP release ===
The LP Release of the album is notable for including the track "L.I.O.N. (Like It Or Not)" which was exclusively released for the LP and made available for streaming through Spotify. In the respective releases, the track is listed between "Last To Know" and "Energy"

== Charts ==
Year	Chart	Position
2018	Billboard 200	199
2018	Billboard Reggae Albums	1
