= Iration =

American reggae/pop band

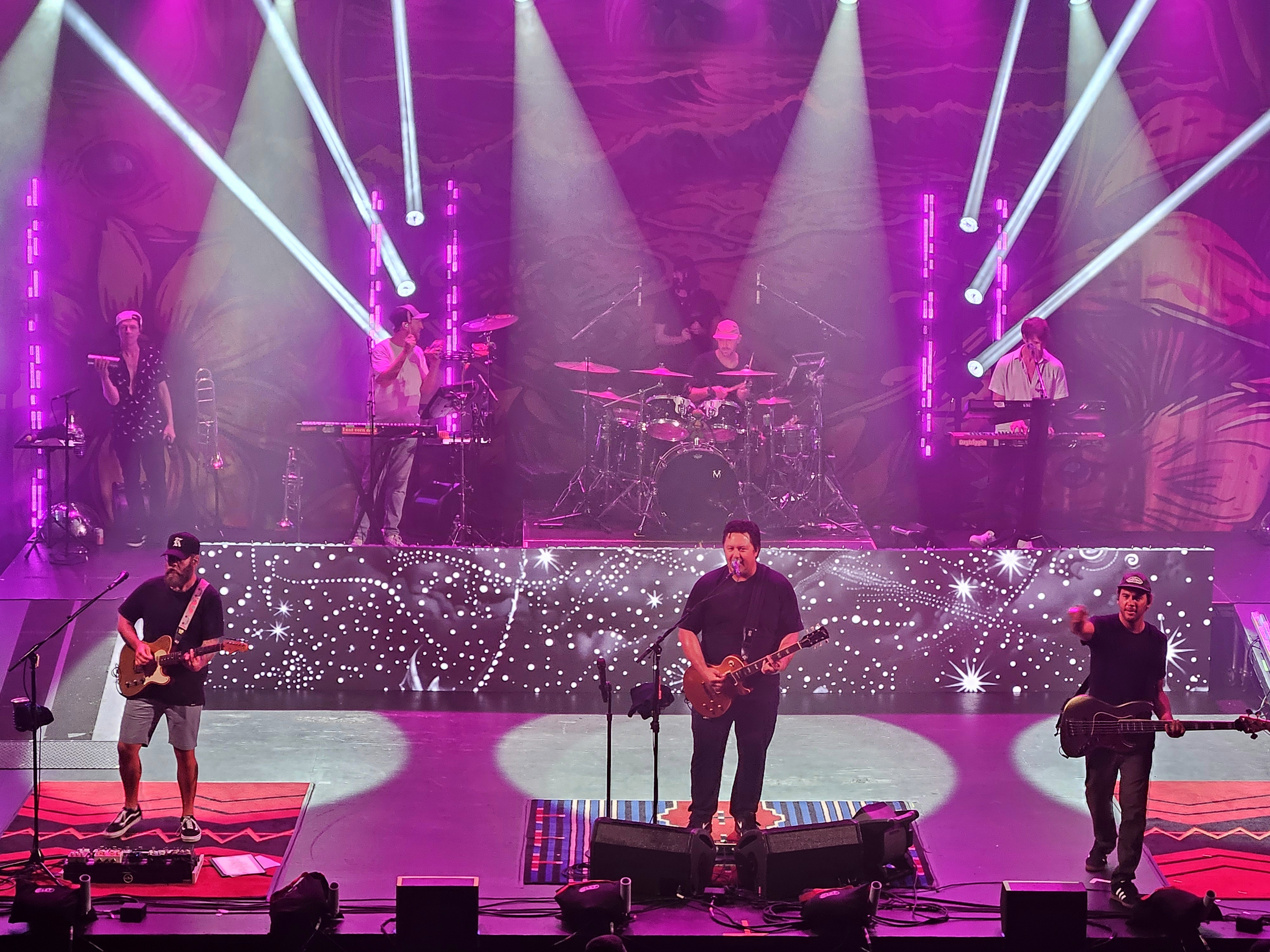
- Iration performing at College Street Music Hall in New Haven, CT on August 3, 2024

Background information
- Origin: Hawaii, United States
- Genres: Reggae, dub, reggae rock, pop
- Years active: 2004–present
- Label: Three Prong Records
- Members: Micah Pueschel; Adam Taylor; Joseph Dickens; Cayson Peterson; Micah Brown; Drake Peterson
- Past members: Kai Rediske; Joseph King; Catlin Peterson
- Website: http://irationmusic.com

Iration is a reggae/pop group from Santa Barbara, California. All members originally hail from Hawaii. They play a mix of reggae, dub, pop, and rock.

== History ==
=== Formation and New Roots EP (2006) ===
Iration began in Isla Vista, an unincorporated community connected to UC Santa Barbara, playing reggae covers in college towns such as Cal Poly SLO, Chico State, and UC Davis. They recorded an EP, New Roots, in 2006, and built a reputation for their live performance, according to the Santa Barbara Independent: "There's something to be said for any band that can capture the undivided attention of a crowd full of drunken Isla Vistans, especially when there are kegs to be tapped and cops to avoid. But roots reggae rockers Iration manage to 'do it' on a regular basis."

=== No Time To Rest (2007) ===
In 2007, they recorded and released their first full-length album, No Time for Rest, which topped the Billboard Reggae Albums Chart.

=== Sample This EP (2008) ===
In 2008, Iration embarked on their first national tour, opening for Pepper.

On October 3, 2008, Iration released their second EP, Sample This, which debuted as the No. 3 top-selling reggae album worldwide on iTunes.

=== Time Bomb (2010) and Fresh Grounds EP (2011) ===
They released their second album, Time Bomb, in March 2010, which also topped the Billboard Reggae Albums Chart and sold over 36,000 copies.

In the week of February 19, 2011, Iration's third EP, Fresh Grounds hit No. 147 on the Billboard magazine's Albums list. They were featured as No. 1 on the magazine's Heatseekers albums list for the week of February 19, 2011.

=== Automatic and touring (2013) ===
In early 2013, after extensive U.S. touring, Iration announced they had finished recording a new full-length album titled Automatic. The album was released in July 2013, sold more than 8,000 copies in its first week of release, and topped the Billboard Reggae Albums Chart. Cage The Elephant guitarist Lincoln Parish is featured on numerous songs, as well as helping to produce the album.

=== Kai's departure and Hotting Up (2013–2015) ===
On April 5, 2013, Iration announced that vocalist Kai Rediske had quit the band. While Iration's official announcement of this via their own website stated Kai left to "pursue other interests."

The band's fourth album, Hotting Up, was released in August 2015 and, just as the first three albums had, topped the Billboard Reggae Albums chart.

=== Double Up acoustic album (2016) ===
On December 2, 2016, Iration released Double Up, an acoustic album. It featured songs from the band's entire catalog of music. They "stripped them back and gave them an alternate life. We thought about a wave doubling up and the fact that it's another version of the same entity." The album reached No. 2 on the Billboard Reggae Albums chart.

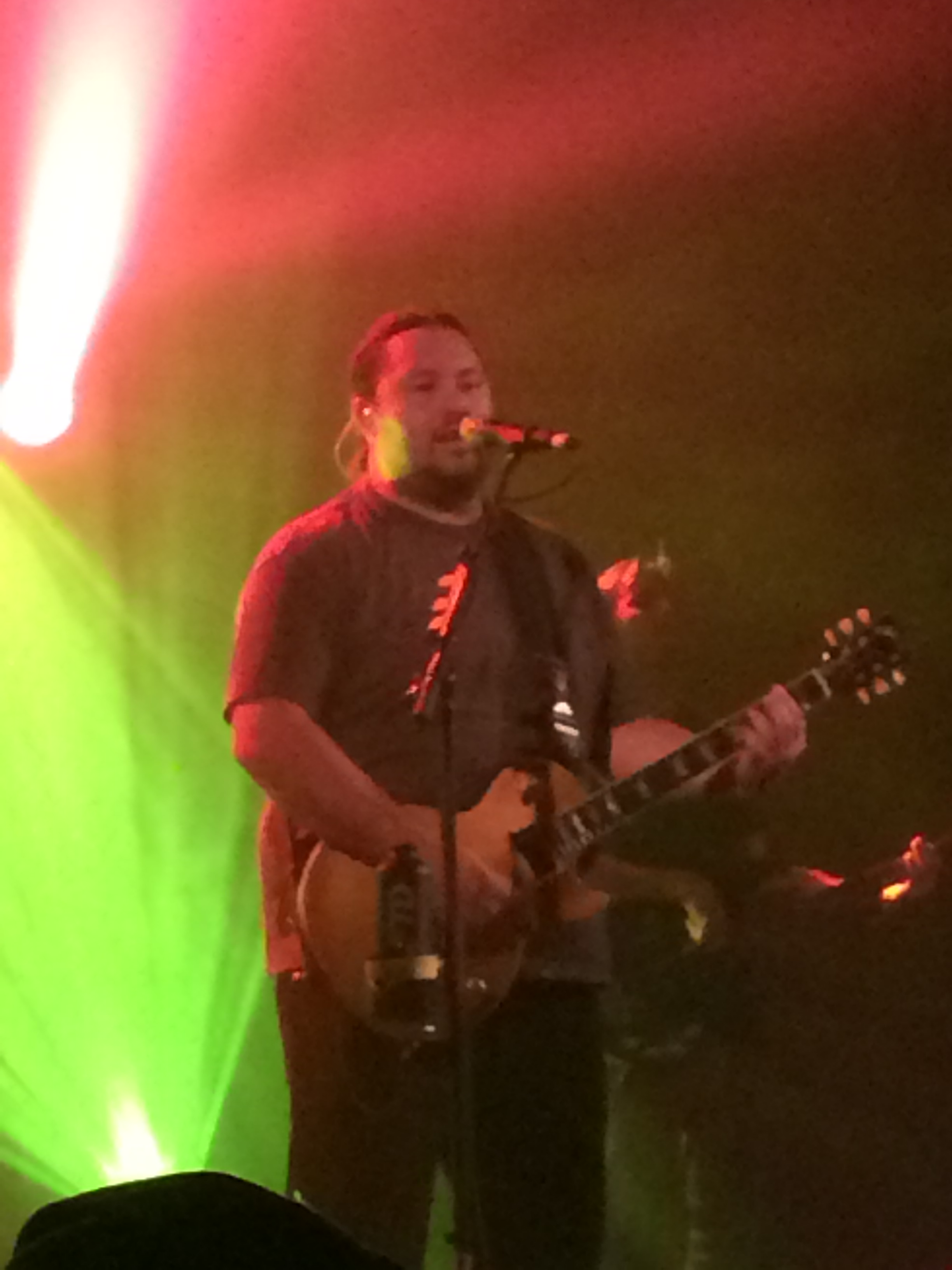
Lead singer Micah Pueschel performing in Eugene, Oregon on February 21, 2016

=== Self-titled album (2018) ===
Iration recorded a self-titled album, their sixth studio album, which was released on May 18, 2018. The band collaborated with reggae artists J Boog, Slightly Stoopid, and Tyrone's Jacket and featured 16 tracks. The album peaked on the Billboard Reggae Album chart at No. 2, the Independent Albums chart at No. 14 and made it onto the Billboard 200 at No. 199.

=== Coastin' and live album (2020–2022) ===
On March 9, 2020, the band announced their seventh studio album, titled Coastin', alongside a promotional tour, the "Coastin' Summer Tour", set to feature roots reggae band Tribal Seeds. Due to the COVID-19 pandemic, however, they were forced to postpone the tour. The album featured tracks with Common Kings, Eli-Mac, Eric Rachmany of Rebelution and Stick Figure. The album was released on July 10, 2020.

On March 13, 2021, Iration announced a dub version of Coastin' on their Facebook page. The 7-song EP features dub remixes of Coastin' tracks and was released on both vinyl and all digital platforms on May 7, 2021.

On May 22, 2021, Iration was one of many selected reggae bands featured on Collie Buddz's second riddim album, Cali Roots Riddim 2021, with their single "Be Alright".

On November 18, 2022, Iration released their first official live album, titled Backyard Sessions: Malibu Edition, on all digital platforms. They recorded the album the previous year during the Coronavirus pandemic outside, overlooking the Pacific Ocean in Malibu, California. It was originally for their first live stream on NoCap Shows, but they decided to make a live album instead.

=== Daytrippin' (2023–present) ===
Over the span of Iration's 2022 Sunshine and Summer Nights tour with Atmosphere, Iration would open every night of their concerts with a brand new, unreleased song titled "New Style". After Iration's 2022 tour, much speculation of new music was circulating around as the band kept hinting at and posting snippets of new music and studio clips.

On February 6, 2023, Iration announced a new track titled "New Style", which was the same song that premiered during their 2022 tour, with slight changes. Iration then announced that "New Style" would premiere a day early at Kamp fest before its initial release on February 10.

On April 11, 2023, Iration announced their second single of the year, titled "IRL" (abbreviation for "in real life"). Shortly after "IRL" released, Iration announced their IRL Fall Tour with Artikal Soundsystem and Cydeways.

On June 2, 2023, Iration announced on their social media pages that their eighth studio album, titled Daytrippin', will release on October 6, 2023. The album features 10 tracks that includes Maxi Priest and Claire Wright. The album is produced by Suzy Shinn, which has been confirmed on her Instagram under the band's Three Prong Records. Micah Pueschel describes the band's return to their original sound:

"Daytrippin is a return to our roots. We set out to strike a balance between polished studio production and the electrifying energy of a live show. We leaned on our reggae and rock influences to find a natural evolution from earlier albums like Time Bomb and Hotting Up."

On June 7, 2023, Iration announced that the third single would be the title track of the album and would release on June 9 alongside merch bundle pre-orders including a splatter vinyl, CD, a Daytrippin sweatshirt, and Daytrippin decal.

Iration also announced early in the year that they would be opening for Rebelution in their Good Vibes Summer Tour 2023 alongside The Expendables and Passafire. After the second leg of the Good Vibes Summer Tour with Rebelution, Iration announced the fourth and final single from Daytrippin' titled "Last Night" featuring British Reggae singer Maxi Priest, released on September 9.

On October 6, 2023, Daytrippin was released with six new songs: "Can't Look Back", "Strange", "California Dreams", "Remedy", "The Stream", "Comedown" (feat. Claire Wright); and four songs released previously as singles: "New Style", "IRL", "Daytrippin", and "Last Night" (feat. Maxi Priest). The band also announced a Daytrippin release party after Reggae Rise Up Las Vegas, along with a Spotify listening party on October 10 and a Reddit AMA.

== Awards and honors ==
On July 29, 2021, Iration announced on their social media platforms that their 2010 song "Time Bomb" is officially RIAA Gold certified. To celebrate this milestone, they launched a new merch collection and partnered with Sweet.io to provide the band's first official NFT.

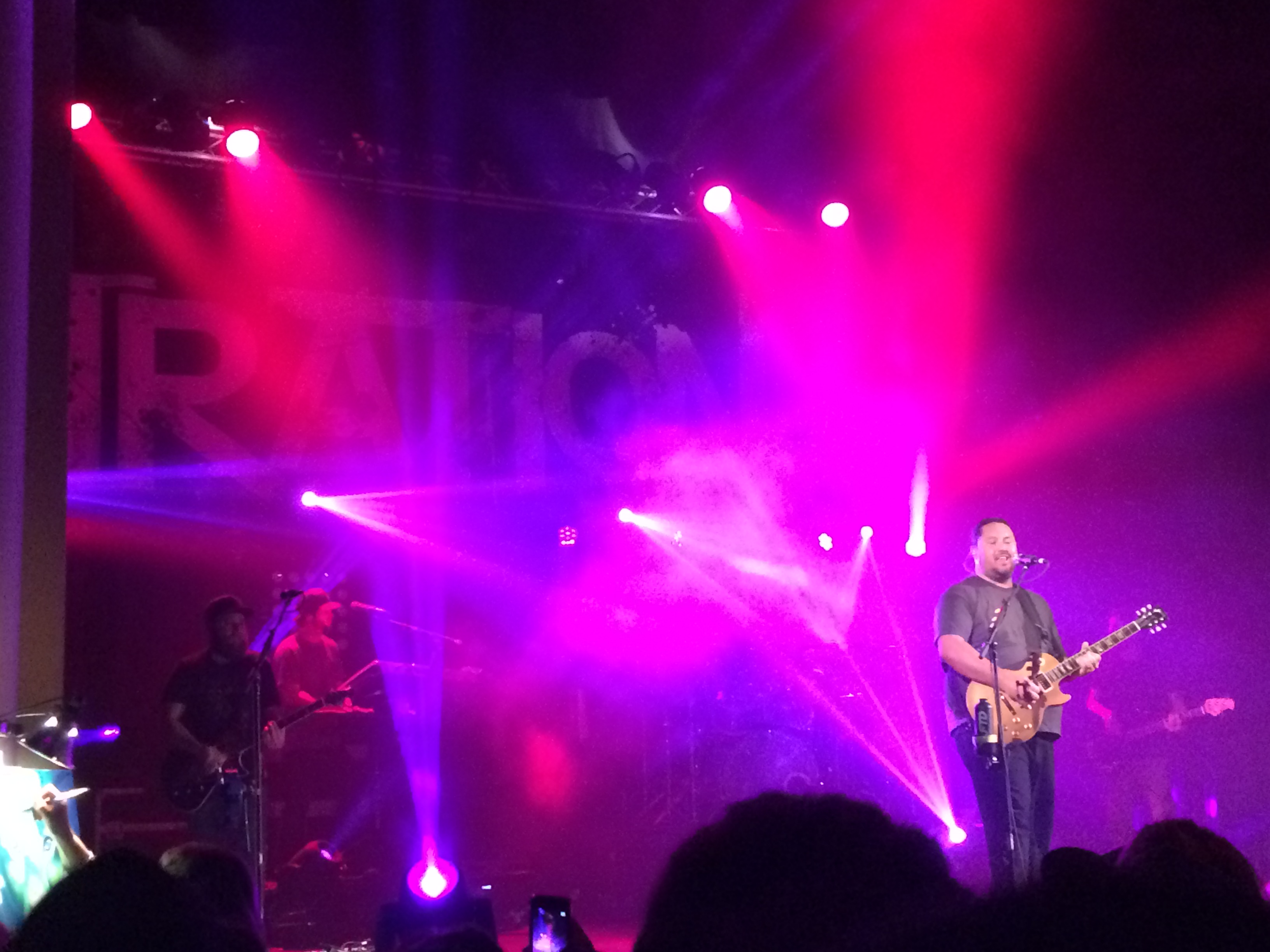
Iration performing in Eugene, Oregon on February 21, 2016.

== Other projects ==
Iration teamed up with Arrow Lodge Brewing in Covina, California to brew a special beer and 40-ounce can. Named after the band's 2020 song "Chill Out" from their Coastin album, this IPA was brewed with Bird Pick Tea for a tropical taste.

Iration also collaborated with MERGE4 to create special pairs of socks featuring artwork from the band's album catalog. The socks are available in Iration's online merch store on their website.

Playing as much golf as possible while not on tour, Iration teamed up with Seamus Golf of Beaverton, Oregon, on a handmade collaboration. The limited edition and quantities golf collection features a custom-made Oil Can Ball Mark with the diamond Iration logo in metal that creates tan, bronze, purple and blue hues; a hand-crafted, waterproof, military-grade Cordura head cover with an embroidered full-color Iration logo and lined with black fleece. Also included is the band's custom black polo shirt as a bundle for a discounted price.

In August 2023, Iration collaborated with Melin, a Southern California hatwear company, for an exclusive cap with the band's logo. Called the "Coronado Melin x Iration Hydro", this lightweight, water-resistant, breathable antimicrobial cap comes in black and white.

== Lineup ==
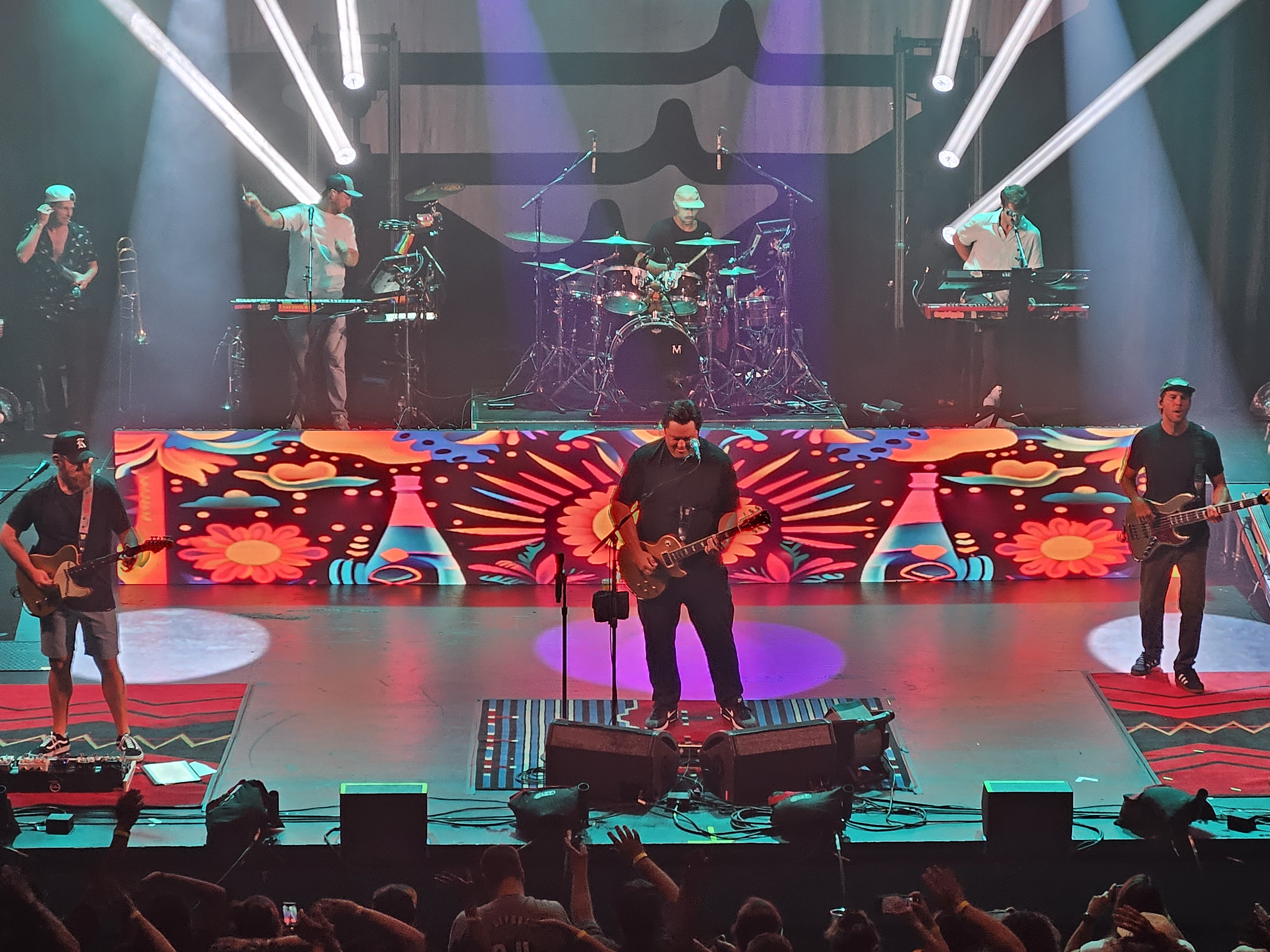
Iration performing on their Daytrippin' Tour on their stop in New Haven, CT, Summer 2024

=== Current members ===
- Micah Pueschel – lead vocals, guitar (2004–present)
- Adam Taylor – bass (2004–present)
- Cayson Peterson – keyboards/synthesizer (2004–present)
- Joseph Dickens ("The D") – drums (2004–present)
- Micah Brown – lead guitar, vocals (2014–present)
- Drake Peterson – percussion, trumpet (2017–present)
- Tony Rinaldi – percussion, trombone (2018–present)

=== Former members ===
- Kai Rediske – vocals, percussion (2004–2013)
- Catlin Peterson – vocals, guitar
- Joseph King – dub controls, live sound

== Discography ==
=== Studio albums ===
Title	Album details	Peak chart positions			Sales
Title	Album details	US	US Reggae	US Indie	Sales
No Time for Rest	Release date: June 19, 2007; Label: Self-release; Formats: CD, Digital	—	1	—	
Time Bomb	Release date: March 9, 2010; Label: LAW Records; Formats: CD, LP, Digital	—	1	—	US: 36,000 copies
Automatic	Release date: July 2, 2013; Label: Three Prong Records; Formats: CD, LP, Digital	75	1	16	US: 8,000 copies (first week); US: 23,000 copies
Hotting Up	Release date: August 28, 2015; Label: Three Prong Records; Formats: CD, LP, Digital	79	1	5	US: 18,000 copies
Double Up (Acoustic)	Release date: December 2, 2016; Label: Three Prong Records; Formats: CD, Digital	—	2	—	
Iration	Release date: May 18, 2018; Label: Three Prong Records; Formats: CD, LP, Digital	199	2	14	
Coastin'	Release date: July 10, 2020; Label: Three Prong Records; Formats: CD, LP, Digital	—	2	—	US: 2,769 copies (first week)
Daytrippin'	Release date: October 6, 2023; Label: Three Pong Records; Formats: CD, LP, Digital	—	10	—	
Where It All Began	Release date: May 1, 2026; Label: Three Pong Records; Formats: CD, LP, Digital	—	8	—	
"—" denotes releases that did not chart

=== EPs & Live Albums ===
Title	Album details	Peak chart positions	
Title	Album details	US	US Reggae
New Roots	Release date: July 12, 2006; Label: New Roots Records; Formats: CD, Digital	—	—
Sample This	Release date: October 3, 2008; Label: Michael Harlan; Formats: Digital	—	—
Fresh Grounds	Release date: February 1, 2011; Label: Three Prong Records; Formats: Digital	147	3
Backyard Sessions: Malibu Edition (Live)	Release date: November 18, 2022; Label: Three Prong Records; Formats: Digital	—	8
"—" denotes releases that did not chart

=== Singles ===
Title	Release date	Album
"Meditation"	June 23, 2005	New Roots EP
"Fire"	June 23, 2005	New Roots EP
"All Night"	November 30, 2006	No Time To Rest
"Generation Time" (feat. Mikey Dread)	November 30, 2006	No Time To Rest
"Downtown"	November 30, 2006	No Time To Rest
"Get Up"	November 30, 2006	No Time To Rest
"Cookie Jar"	November 30, 2006	No Time To Rest
"I'm With You"	October 3, 2008	Sample This EP
"Electricity"	October 3, 2008	Sample This EP
"Falling"	October 3, 2008	Sample This EP
"Wait and See"	October 3, 2008	Sample This EP
"Time Bomb"	March 9, 2010	Time Bomb
"Turn Around"	March 9, 2010	Time Bomb
"Let Me Inside"	March 9, 2010	Time Bomb
"Dream"	March 9, 2010	Time Bomb
"You Don't Know" (feat. Tunji)	March 9, 20l0	Time Bomb
"Summer Nights"	August 17, 2010	Fresh Grounds EP
"No Letter"	February 1, 2011	Fresh Grounds EP
"Work It Out"	February 1, 2011	Fresh Grounds EP
"No Time"	February 14, 2012	#Allaboutluv.
"Undertow"	February 14, 2012	#Allaboutluv.
"Porcupine" (feat. Lincoln Parish)	September 11, 2012	(Single)
"Back Around"	July 2, 2013	Automatic
"One Way Track"	July 2, 2013	Automatic
"Automatic"	July 2, 2013	Automatic
"This Old Song"	July 2, 2013	Automatic
"Mr. Operator"	July 2, 2013	Automatic
"Milk and Honey" (feat. Lincoln Parish)	July 2, 2013	Automatic
"Show Me"	June 24, 2014	Hotting Up
"Reelin"	April 27, 2015	Hotting Up
"Lost and Found"	August 28, 2015	Hotting Up
"Hotting Up"	August 28, 2015	Hotting Up
"You Know You Don't Mind"	August 28, 2015	Hotting Up
"Summer Nights" (Acoustic)	December 6, 2016	Double Up
"Home" (Acoustic)	December 6, 2016	Double Up
"Fly With Me"	May 19, 2017	Iration
"Borderlines"	August 11, 2017	Iration
"Hit List"	January 19, 2018	Iration
"Danger" (feat. J Boog and Tyrone's Jacket)	March 30, 2018	Iration
"Already Gold"	May 18, 2018	Iration
"Broken Promises"(feat. Slightly Stoopid)	May 18, 2018	Iration
"Press Play"	May 18, 2018	Iration
"All For You"	May 18, 2018	Iration
"Warm Waters"	May 18, 2018	Iration
"Borderlines"	May 18, 2018	Iration
"Energy"	May 18, 2018	Iration
"Stay The Course"	May 18, 2018	Iration
"Chill Out"	June 28, 2019	Coastin'
"Right Here, Right Now" (feat. Eric Rachmany and Stick Figure)	June 11, 2020	Coastin'
"Move Forward"	June 17, 2020	Coastin'
"Coastin'"	June 26, 2020	Coastin'
"Guava Lane" (feat. Eli Mac)	July 10, 2020	Coastin'
"Zen Island"	July 10, 2020	Coastin'
"If You Only Knew" (feat. Common Kings)	July 10, 2020	Coastin'
"Learn From Me"	July 10, 2020	Coastin'
"Contact High"	July 10, 2020	Coastin'
"Daylight Saving"	July 10, 2020	Coastin'
"Last Christmas" (Wham! cover)	December 22, 2020	(Single)
"DJs" (Sublime cover)	January 15, 2021	The House That Bradley Built (Single)
"Zen Island" (Stoney Eye Studios Dub Remix)	March 12, 2021	Coastin' Dub (Single)
"Right Here Right Now" (feat. Eric Rachmany & Stick Figure) (Scientist Dub Remix I)	April 19, 2021	Coastin' Dub (Single)
"Be Alright"	May 22, 2021	Cali Roots Riddim 2021 (Single)
"Holiday in Paradise"	November 19, 2021	(Single)
"New Style"	February 10, 2023	Daytrippin (Single)
"IRL" (In Real Life)	April 14, 2023	Daytrippin (Single)
"Daytrippin"	June 9, 2023	Daytrippin (Single)
"Last Night" (feat. Maxi Priest)	September 8, 2023	Daytrippin (Single)
"Comedown" (feat. Claire Wright)	October 6, 2023	Daytrippin
"Number 1" (feat. Kolohe Kai)	March 29, 2024	(Single)
"Island Time"	September 20, 2024	(Single)
"Say Goodnight" (feat. Little Stranger)	June 13, 2025	(Single)

== Collaborations ==
Iration (Micah Puesuel & Micah Brown) has collaborated or was featured on songs with artists and bands throughout the years.

- Tropidelic – "Floating" (feat. MP/The Elovaters) (5/17/2024)
- Claire Wright – "New Day" (feat. Iration/MP) (3/17/2023)
- Mihali – "Living is the Lesson" (feat. Iration/MP) (5/2/2022)
- Cisco Adler – "Catch My Wave" (feat. Iration/MP) (8/15/2022)
- The Movement – "On & On" (feat. Iration/MP) (5/20/2022)
- The Ries Brothers – "Don't Want To Be Late" (feat. Iration/MP) (7/16/2021)
- Morgan Heritage – "Weekend Greens" (feat. Iration & Pepper) (8/2/2019)
- Pepper – "My Holiday" (feat. Micah Brown) (6/28/2019)
- The Expendables – "Without Love" (feat. MP) (8/14/2018)
- Fluid Foundation – "Margarita" (feat. Iration/MP) (5/5/2018)
- Stick Figure – "Smokin Love" (Remix) (feat. Collie Buddz, J Boog, Iration, & Dizzy Wright) (6/11/2015)
- Gary Dread (Jackson) – "Like You" (feat. MP & MB) (2/16/2015)
- Rebelution – "More Love" (Yeti Beats Remix) (feat. Iration, J Boog, & The Green) (1/16/2015)
- Seu Cuca – "Sunny Times" (feat. Iration/MP) (5/15/2014)
