= Sleep in Your Grave =

Studio album by Manntis
- Released: June 28, 2005
- Recorded: Maple Sound Studio
- Genre: Metalcore
- Length: 28:41 (standard edition); 36:34 (special edition)
- Label: Century Media Records
- Producer: Cameron Webb

Manntis chronology
Sleep in Your Grave (2005)	Master of Ceremonies (2008)

Professional ratings
Review scores
Source	Rating
AllMusic	3.5/5 stars

Sleep in Your Grave is the debut album by the American metalcore band Manntis. The album was released on June 28, 2005, through Century Media Records. Some special international editions of the album featured three bonus tracks (demos) and two enhanced video clips.

== Track listing ==
1. "Axe of Redemption" – 2:43
2. "Shades of Hatred" – 2:09
3. "Approach" – 3:00
4. "Reflections of You" – 2:44
5. "My Enemy" – 2:07
6. "A New Breed of Life" – 2:29
7. "Second Life Ahead" – 3:12
8. "Weathered Soul" – 3:05
9. "Resist and Overcome" – 2:06
10. "Sleep in Your Grave" – 2:57
11. "The End's Where It Begins" – 2:06

== Special international edition(s) ==
=== Bonus tracks ===
1. "A New Breed of Life" (Demo) – 2:27
2. "Shades of Hatred" (Demo) – 2:19
3. "My Enemy" (Demo) – 2:46

=== Video clips ===
- "A New Breed of Life" (Live video)
- "Axe of Redemption" (Music video)

== Personnel ==
=== Musicians ===
- Jake Sirokman – vocals
- Adair Cobley – lead guitar, backing vocals
- Jeremy Swanson – rhythm guitar, backing vocals
- Clint Gregory – bass
- Jimmie Sanders – drums

=== Credits ===
- Cameron Webb – Mixing
- Cameron Webb and Sergio Chavez – Engineering
- Kevin Bartley – Mastering (Capitol Mastering)
