= Pepper LIVE DVD =

Video by Pepper
- Released: March 8, 2005
- Recorded: at The Troubadour 2004
- Genre: Rock, reggae, ska, dub
- Label: Volcom Entertainment

Pepper chronology
Pepper LIVE DVD	Searching For The Haj DVD (20??)

Pepper LIVE DVD is a DVD by Pepper that was filmed over the course of two sold-out 2004 performances at the L.A.'s Troubador night club.

The DVD was released on March 8, 2005, through Volcom Entertainment.

== Tracks ==
1. "7 Weeks"
2. "Stone Love"
3. "Back Home"
4. "B.O.O.T."
5. "Use Me"
6. "Tongues"
7. "Feels Good"
8. "Tradewinds"
9. "Your Way"
10. "Punk Rock Cowboy"
11. "Stormtrooper"
12. "Too Much"
13. "Ashes"
14. "Love Affair"
15. "Give It Up"
16. "Sitting on the Curb"
17. "The Arena"
18. "Naughti Girl"
