= Battle for Ozzfest =

- Genre: Reality television
- Directed by: Lisa Caruso; Rick Telles
- Judges: Ozzy Osbourne
- Opening theme: "Progenies of the Great Apocalypse" by Dimmu Borgir
- Country of origin: United States
- Original language: English
- No. of seasons: 1
- No. of episodes: 12

Production
- Production companies: So Divine Productions; MTV Networks

Original release
- Network: MTV
- Release: October 25, 2004 – January 10, 2005

Battle for Ozzfest is a reality television show that aired during autumn 2004 on MTV, where eight bands 'battle' it out in a series of challenges to win a spot on the stage of the metal festival Ozzfest, which is a primarily heavy metal-subgenre based music festival. The series lasted 12 episodes, the winner being decided by online voters.

== Cast ==
Contestants
| Band Member | Band | Finish |
|---|---|---|
| Marc Serrano | A Dozen Furies | Winner |
| Adair Cobley | Manntis | 6th eliminated |
| Ryan Camp | Cynder (later known as Curse Your Name) | Runner Up |
| Ahmad Alkurabi | Beyond All Reason | 5th eliminated |
| Chelsea Muckerman | Final Drive | 4th eliminated |
| Brittany Paige Bouck | Guilt by Association | 3rd eliminated |
| Kelly Abe | Sicks Deep | 2nd eliminated |
| Jesse Preston | Trauma Concept | 1st eliminated |
