= The Expendables (American band) =

American reggae rock band

- Origin: Santa Cruz, California, U.S.
- Genres: Reggae rock, ska, punk rock, surf rock
- Years active: 1997–present
- Labels: Stoopid Records; Ineffable Records
- Members: Raul Bianchi; Ryan DeMars; Geoff Weers; Adam Patterson
- Past members: Cam Hanson
- Website: The Expendables

The Expendables are an American reggae rock band from Santa Cruz, California.

== History ==
=== Formation and sound style (1997–2000) ===
The Expendables was formed in 1997 by elementary school buddies Geoff Weers on vocals and guitar, Raul Bianchi on lead guitar and Adam Patterson on drums. The trio started out as a "party band" while they were in high school. They covered a lot of surf rock songs such as "Wipeout" and Dick Dale's "Miserloo" for friends birthdays and family gatherings. Then in 2000, the band added Ryan DeMars on bass and the quartet completed their "laid-back" surf sound born on their hometown beaches of Santa Cruz, California.

Their music is a diverse mix of styles, including reggae, ska, surf rock, punk, and metal.

=== No Time To Worry and Open Container (2001–2003) ===
The Expendables added another guitarist, Cam Hanson, to the lineup for their upcoming debut album. The band recorded their first studio album titled, No Time To Worry, on January 2, 2001, at the local Paradise Recordings. This 18-song LP was released on Right Time Records. It was mastered by Rick "Rev. Lovejoy" Williams and featured rap vocals on the song "B.A.D." by Marcuz Rodriguez.

They quickly followed their debut album up with a second studio album, Open Container, which released on January 1, 2002, on Right Time Records. Again, it was self-produced by the band and featured 16 tracks. However, this was the last album for Cam Hanson on guitar and the band went back to being a quartet.

With their popularity growing around town, in 2003, they had their own radio show called Locals Only on radio station KMBY.

=== Gettin' Filthy and Self-titled album (2004–2007) ===
On September 28, 2004, the band released their third album titled Gettin' Filthy, which featured their first two hit singles, "Keef Bowl For Two" and "Sacrifice". "Sacrifice" was also available as a playable song in the music video game Guitar Hero World Tour (a.k.a. Guitar Hero 4). For this album, the band utilized studio musician Steve Hoffman on keyboards and piano on four tracks. It was recorded and mixed at Sy Klopps Studios in San Francisco.

In 2005, the Expendables contributed to a compilation album that was a fundraising effort for the USA junior surfing team. The 2005 film XXX Rated: A Year in the Life of a Santa Cruz Phenomenon follows the band during some of their touring.

On September 4, 2007, the band recorded their fourth album, the self-titled The Expendables, which was the first LP to be released on Slightly Stoopid's own label, Stoopid Records. The 16-song album featured the popular singles, "Down, Down, Down" and "Ganja Smugglin'". In the studio they added keys, percussion and trumpet, along with Miles Doughty of Slightly Stoopid on vocals for some songs. For a time members of the band played in San Clemente CA. where they picked up a young drummer from Dana Point, Austin Green who called out a temporary bass player for kicking his drum cymbals over in a studio warehouse off Pico. Josie, the owner of the studio where the band played, kicked the temp. bass player out after refusing to apologies or fight for the disrespect. The young promising drummer walked away to attend college. In 2007, The Expendables — the Santa Cruz, California reggae rock band — were active on the West Coast, including in Orange County, California. While their main 2007 tour featured stops in major cities like New York, Chicago, and Los Angeles, they also played in smaller venues across the region.

Orange County appearance On September 30, 2007, The Expendables performed at The Boardwalk in Orangevale, California as part of a set with The Supervillains and Nine Hours North. This was a local/regional show, fitting their style of playing in surf and reggae rock venues.

=== Prove It and Gone Soft acoustic album (2010–2012) ===
Their fifth studio album, Prove It, released on May 11, 2010, on Stoopid Records. It certainly proved to be their most musically influenced album yet. With the addition of keyboards, trumpet, saxophone, percussion, vibraphone, rainstick, and extra dub effects, as well as vocals and harmonica by G. Love. The album was mixed and produced by Aaron "El Hefe" Abeyta and Paul Leary (who also produced for Sublime) at Big Fish Recordings in Encinitas, California.

On April 21, 2012, the Expendables released a new single for Record Store Day, "Back Home Again", recorded during their acoustic sessions. On May 17, 2012, the band released their first acoustic album, titled Gone Soft, which included acoustic versions of their previous songs. They added musicians who played banjo, cello, mandolin, percussion and violin to their tracks. It was recorded at Coral Street Studios and mixed by Paul Leary at Preacher Mon Studios.

Raul Bianchi explained in an interview with Monday Magazine about the possibilities of a split album with themselves: "One of the things we've thought about doing is a split with ourselves, where we do two EPs in one: one all metal and one all reggae. And one of the ideas we approached was doing newer versions of some songs. Like maybe doing heavier versions of some of our reggae songs and doing reggae versions of some more rock or metal songs. We don't really have time for it right now, but it's something that we're definitely considering."

=== Sand In The Sky (2013–2015) ===
In early 2013, they began playing another new song live, titled "Black Heart". This track would be a precursor to their upcoming album.

On January 13, 2015, the band's sixth studio album, Sand in the Sky, was released on Stoopid Records. The 12-song LP featured two singles, "Starry Night" and "Music Move Me". It included Geoff Weers not only on guitar but keyboard as well, among other musicians on trumpet, percussion, saxophone and trombone.

=== Moment EP and Gone Raw (2017–2021) ===
On May 5, 2017, the band released their first EP, Moment, on Ineffable Records, to whom the band is currently signed with. The album shows the band moving in different musical directions by collaborating with popular reggae artists like Eric Rachmany of Rebelution and Micah Pueschel of Iration. It includes the hit single "I Won't Give Up", featuring HIRIE. The album debuted at No. 1 on the Billboard Top Reggae Albums chart. The EP was mixed by top reggae producer Danny Kalb.

The Expendables released their second acoustic album, Gone Raw, on December 6, 2019.

They released their first live album, titled Live From Hollywood, on September 18, 2020, as the band wanted to put out new material during the COVID-19 pandemic. The session was recorded live at The Roxy on November 17, 2017.

The Expendables recorded a single, "You're Right Here", which released on December 11, 2020. The music video featured the band live in the studio with cameos of popular American reggae band members singing along. The video was dedicated to "all the fans, bands, and crew members, and everyone in the industry affected by the 2020 COVID shutdown who work tirelessly to make live music possible."

=== Pleasure Point album (2023) ===
In February 2023, singer Geoff Weers recorded and digitally released two solo singles: "Let's Make Music" and "Yearn to Burn" featuring Kash'd Out.

On May 3, 2023, the Expendables announced on their social media pages that their new album, called Pleasure Point, was planned to be released on June 23.

== Tours ==
The Expendables average 125–150 shows a year, including international countries like Germany and Guam. They have toured with such acts as 311, Pepper, Slightly Stoopid, Kottonmouth Kings, Less Than Jake, G. Love & Special Sauce, and Reel Big Fish. The band is signed to the record label Stoopid Records, which is owned by Slightly Stoopid.

They have funded their own headlining tours across the country as well. They also headlined the Ladera Skateboards Winter Blackout 2012 Tour along with Fortunate Youth, MTHDS, and The Roots.

In 2021, the Expendables returned to touring in the summer with their first tour since the COVID-19 pandemic on the west coast.

Starting on September 26, 2021, the Expendables co-headlined a fall tour with Ballyhoo! titled "The ExpendaHoo! 2021 Tour", which included opening band Tunnel Vision. They collaborated with Ballyhoo! on their 2011 single "Walk Away", creating a remixed version with both Howie Spangler and Geoff Weers on vocals. The band also covered Ballyhoo!'s "Social Drinker" single. Then, Ballyhoo! covered the Expendables' 2007 single, "Down Down Down". Both bands digitally released these songs during the tour.

== Other projects ==
In the summer of 2021, the Expendables teamed up with Pablo Robles of Wine Boss to make a limited-run bottle of petit sirah called "Bottle For Two" after their single "Keef Bowl For Two".

The Expendables expanded their brand into cannabis when they started a boutique company called ExpendaFarms in early 2022. They developed their own marijuana strain, "ExpendaBerry", which is as their song "Bowl For Two" describes it with "frosty purple nugs". The product line includes CBD sublingual tinctures with all the flower farming grown organically and without the use of pesticides.

== Lineup ==
=== Current members ===
- Geoff Weers – lead vocals, guitar (1997–present)
- Raul Bianchi – lead guitar (1997–present)
- Adam Patterson – drums, vocals (1997–present)
- Ryan DeMars – bass (2000–present)

=== Past members ===
- Cam Hanson – guitar (2001–2003) (Note: Featured on the No Time To Worry and Open Container albums.)

== Discography ==
=== Studio albums ===
The Expendables Chart History
Year	Album	Label	Billboard peak
2001	No Time To Worry	Self-released	—
2003	Open Container	Self-released	—
2004	Gettin' Filthy	Right Time Records	—
2007	The Expendables	Stoopid Records	—
2010	Prove It	Stoopid Records	—
2015	Sand In The Sky	Stoopid Records	—
2017	Moment EP	Faction Entertainment	No. 1
2023	Pleasure Point	Ineffable Records	TBD

=== Live/Acoustic albums ===
The Expendables Chart History
Year	Album	Label	Billboard peak
2012	Gone Soft (Acoustic album)	Right Time Records	—
2019	Gone Raw (Acoustic album)	Ineffable Records	—
2020	Live From Hollywood	Ineffable Records	—

=== Singles ===
Title	Release date	Album
"Malibu"	2001	No Time To Worry
"Sensimilla"	2001	No Time To Worry
"My Life"	2001	No Time To Worry
"Full of Fight"	2001	No Time To Worry
"Strive"	2001	No Time To Worry
"Burning Up"	2002	Open Container
"Drift Away"	2002	Open Container
"Die For You"	2002	Open Container
"Succubus"	2002	Open Container
"Bowl For Two"	2004	Gettin' Filthy
"Sacrifice"	2004	Gettin' Filthy
"Let Her Go"	2004	Gettin' Filthy
"Tight Squeeze"	2004	Gettin' Filthy
"Filthy Dub" (feat. Nathan Martisius)	2004	Gettin' Filthy
"Head In My Hands"	2004	Gettin' Filthy
"Would You Like To Know"	2004	Gettin' Filthy
"Bridges Burned"	2004	Gettin' Filthy
"The Cam Song"	2004	Gettin' Filthy
"Down Down Down"	2007	The Expendables
"Ganja Smugglin"	2007	The Expendables
"Minimum Wage"	2007	The Expendables
"Let Loose"	2007	The Expendables
"Paper Chains"	2007	The Expendables
"One More Night"	2007	The Expendables
"Keep Up"	2007	The Expendables
"Take A Ticket"	2007	The Expendables
"Wide Awake"	2007	The Expendables
"S.T.D."	2007	The Expendables
"War Cry"	2007	The Expendables
"Not Gonna Fade"	2007	The Expendables
"Positive Mind"	2010	Prove It
"Wells" (feat. G. Love)	2010	Prove It
"Come Get High"	2010	Prove It
"Get What I Need"	2010	Prove It
"How Many Times"	2010	Prove It
"Black Heart"	2015	Sand In The Sky
"Music Move Me"	2015	Sand In The Sky
"Starry Night"	2015	Sand In The Sky
"Zombies In America"	2015	Sand In The Sky
"Nothing I Wouldn't Do"	2015	Sand In The Sky
"Anti Social"	2015	Sand In The Sky
"Stay Now" (feat. Eric Rachmany of Rebelution)	2017	Moment EP
"I Won't Give Up" (feat. HIRIE)	2017	Moment EP
"Goodbye For Now" (feat. Tech N9ne)	2017	Moment EP
"Without Love" (feat. Micah Pueschel of Iration)	2017	Moment EP
"Let Her Go" (Acoustic)	2019	Gone Raw
"Sacrifice" (Acoustic)	2019	Gone Raw
"Burning Up" (Acoustic)	2019	Gone Raw
"Lives and Loves"	February 28, 2020	(Single)
"Bowl For Two" (Cali Roots Riddim Mix) (feat. Collie Buddz)	May 22, 2020	Cali Roots Riddim 2020
"Surfman Cometh"	July 17, 2020	(Single)
"Down Down Down" (Live)	August 20, 2020	Live From Hollywood
"Stay Now" (Live)	August 20, 2020	Live From Hollywood
"Sacrifice" (Live)	August 20, 2020	Live From Hollywood
"You're Right Here"	December 13, 2020	(Single)
"Wrong Way" (Sublime cover)	January 9, 2021	The House That Bradley Built (Single)
"My Dose"	April 20, 2021	(Single)
"Walk Away" (Ballyhoo! cover)	July 9, 2021	The ExpendaHoo! 2021 Tour (Single)
"Down Down Down" (feat. Ballyhoo!)	July 30, 2021	The ExpendaHoo! 2021 Tour (Single)
"Social Drinker" (Ballyhoo! cover)	August 20, 2021	The ExpendaHoo! 2021 Tour (Single)
"Original One of a Kind" (feat. Howi Spangler of Ballyhoo!)	April 14, 2023	Pleasure Point (Single)
"Do Me" (feat. Brett Bollinger of Pepper)	May 11, 2023	Pleasure Point (Single)
"Homewrecker" (feat. Little Stranger)	June 9, 2023	Pleasure Point (Single)
