= Useless (EP) =

EP by Ünloco
- Released: April 25, 2000
- Recorded: Music Lab (Austin, Texas)
- Genre: Nu metal
- Length: 32:26
- Label: Captiva Records
- Producers: Ünloco, Tim

Ünloco chronology
Unloco EP (1998)	Useless (2000)	Healing (2001)

Useless is an EP by American nu metal band Ünloco, released on April 25, 2000 via Captiva Records. All the songs from the release appeared on the band's major label debut Healing (albeit remastered), with the song "I" changed to the title "Nothing".

== Track listing ==
1. Naive – 3:27
2. Less Of – 4:25
3. Panic – 4:00
4. I – 2:33
5. Useless – 5:02
6. Clean – 4:45
7. Soul - 7:44
