= Pepper (band) =

American reggae rock band

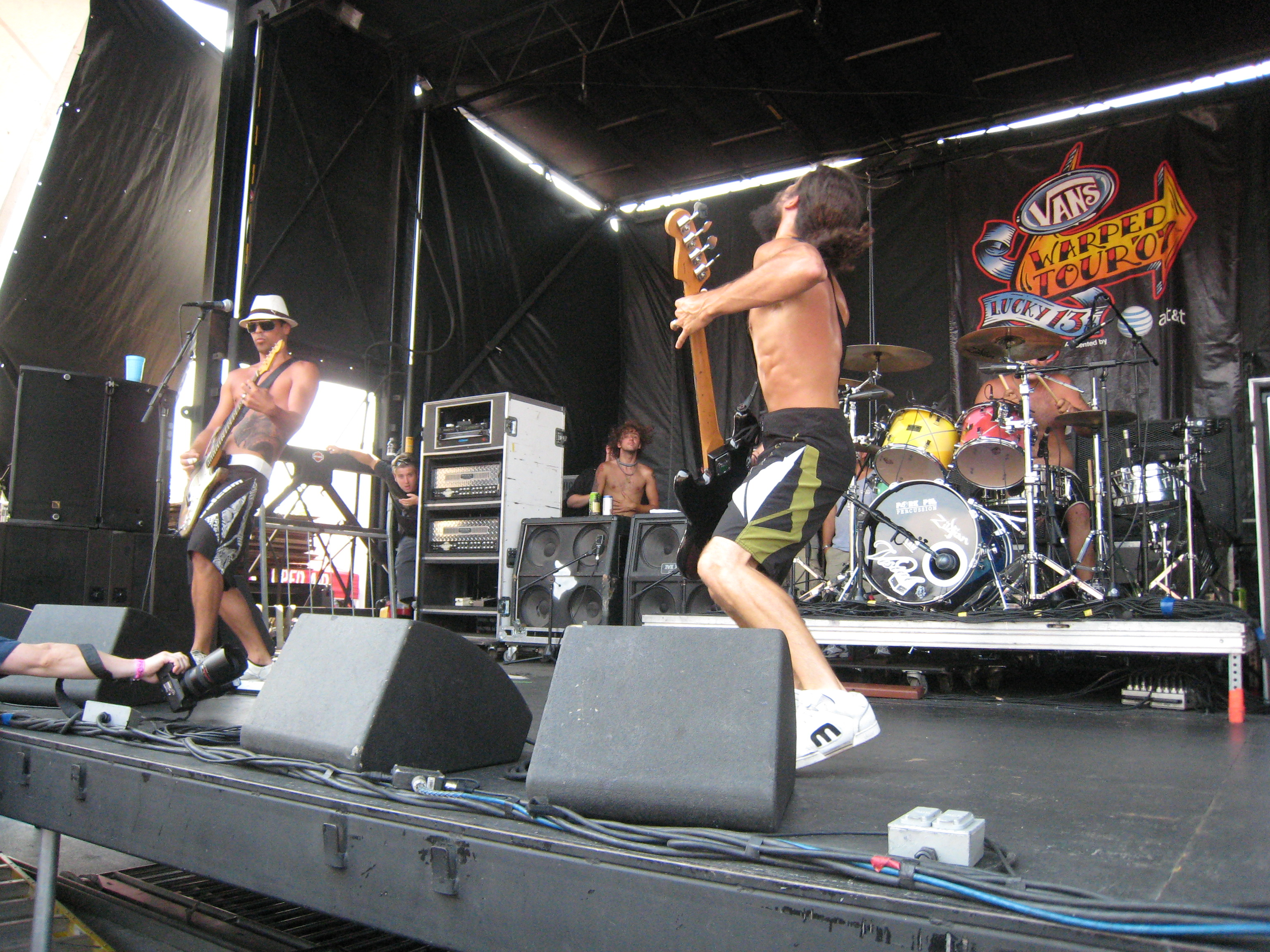
- Pepper performing on the Vans Warped Tour in 2007

Background information
- Origin: Kailua-Kona, Hawaii, U.S.
- Genres: Reggae rock; alternative rock; ska; dub
- Years active: 1996–present
- Labels: Pepper, LAW Records, Volcom Entertainment, Atlantic, Powerslave Records
- Members: Bret Bollinger; Kaleo Wassman; Yesod Williams
- Website: pepperlive.com

Pepper is a three-piece reggae rock band originally from Hawaii, now based in San Diego. The band consists of vocalist/guitarist Kaleo Wassman, vocalist/bassist Bret Bollinger, and drummer Yesod Williams. Since the band's formation they have released eight studio albums, as well as two live albums.

== Band history ==
=== 1996–2001: Formation ===
Pepper formed in 1996 with singer/guitarist Kaleo Wassman and bassist/singer Bret Bollinger, who had been friends since middle school. The duo was influenced by the Hawaiian artist Three Plus and popular mainland groups like Sublime. The group struggled to find a drummer to be in the band, with Wassman stating, "We were going through drummers like a bottomless pit." Wassman and Bollinger heard about a drummer named Yesod Williams who had gained success around their small town, and later met Williams at a party. The two convinced Williams to join the band, and they had to come up with a band name.

In an interview with The Pier, Wassman said "We are three kids in High School in Kailua-Kona, Hawaii. We're all waiters. We always use to get out of work around ten o'clock at night and then I would race home to watch Saturday Night Live. This was back in the 90's when you had all of these All-stars. There was a skit that they kept re-doing and it was called 'The Pepper Boy'. And, basically it's this Italian Restaurant and these 'Pepper Boys' come up to the table, usually to a couple on an exclusive date, and they would come over and OBSCENELY crack pepper all over the woman's plate. It was so funny to us watching the date get so angry and of course the lady just loving the Italian affection. It was one thing the three of us would talk about the next day in Bret's (Bollinger) garage when we were rehearsing and we would just lose it, so we said Pepper for short".

With the trio and new name in place, Pepper left Hawaii for San Diego and went on to open shows by Burning Spear, Shaggy, and other major reggae artists.

Pepper first entered the studio in 1997 and recorded a seven-song demo.

In 1999, after gathering a small local following on the Big Island, Pepper gained the interest of an independent, L.A.-based record company, Volcom Entertainment. Volcom produced and distributed the band's debut release, Give'n It, which combined dancehall, reggae, hip-hop, and pop genres and the band made it on the 2001 Vans Warped Tour.

=== 2002–2005: Kona Town, In With the Old, and mainstream success ===
After years of extensive touring, Pepper took to the studio with Steve Kravac (Less Than Jake, MXPX) to record their second album entitled Kona Town, released in March 2002. The track "Give It Up" was released as a single. The album peaked at #2 on the Billboard Reggae Albums chart.

Pepper continued to tour throughout 2003 and into 2004, including dates with 311 and Snoop Dogg, along with appearances at the annual Bob Marley Birthday celebration, San Diego's Festival "Street Scene", and a U.S. tour with Slightly Stoopid.

In March 2004, Pepper released In With The Old, and got to #34 on the Billboard Heat Seekers and #18 on the Billboard Independent Albums chart. The album was recorded at 311's completely analog Hive Studios by board master Ron St. Germain (Bad Brains, Living Colour, 311, Tool, Sonic Youth, Soundgarden), the album showcases a broader range of influences shared by the trio. The band added punk keyboardist/producer Ronnie King on the album as well.

=== 2006–2009: No Shame, Pink Crustaceans and Good Vibrations ===
Beginning on July 20, 2006, Pepper supported 311 along with The Wailers on their U.S. tour. In August 2006, Jägermeister announced that Pepper & Slightly Stoopid would headline the annual Jägermeister Musictour through December 2006.

The band released their fourth album (and minor label debut) entitled No Shame on October 3, 2006. With Ronnie King on keyboard again, it features production from Nick Hexum of 311, Tony Kanal of No Doubt, and Sublime producer/Butthole Surfers member Paul Leary. A music video was shot for the single "No Control", which became their first commercial single. The album made it to #96 on the Billboard 200 chart.

On March 20, 2007, Pepper released To Da Max: Mistakes and Outtakes (1997–2004), their first compilation album containing rare and B-side tracks.

Pepper appeared on all dates of the 2007 Vans Warped Tour. They toured with The Expendables and Passafire, on their "That's Where I Wanna Be..." 42-stop tour from October to December 2007.

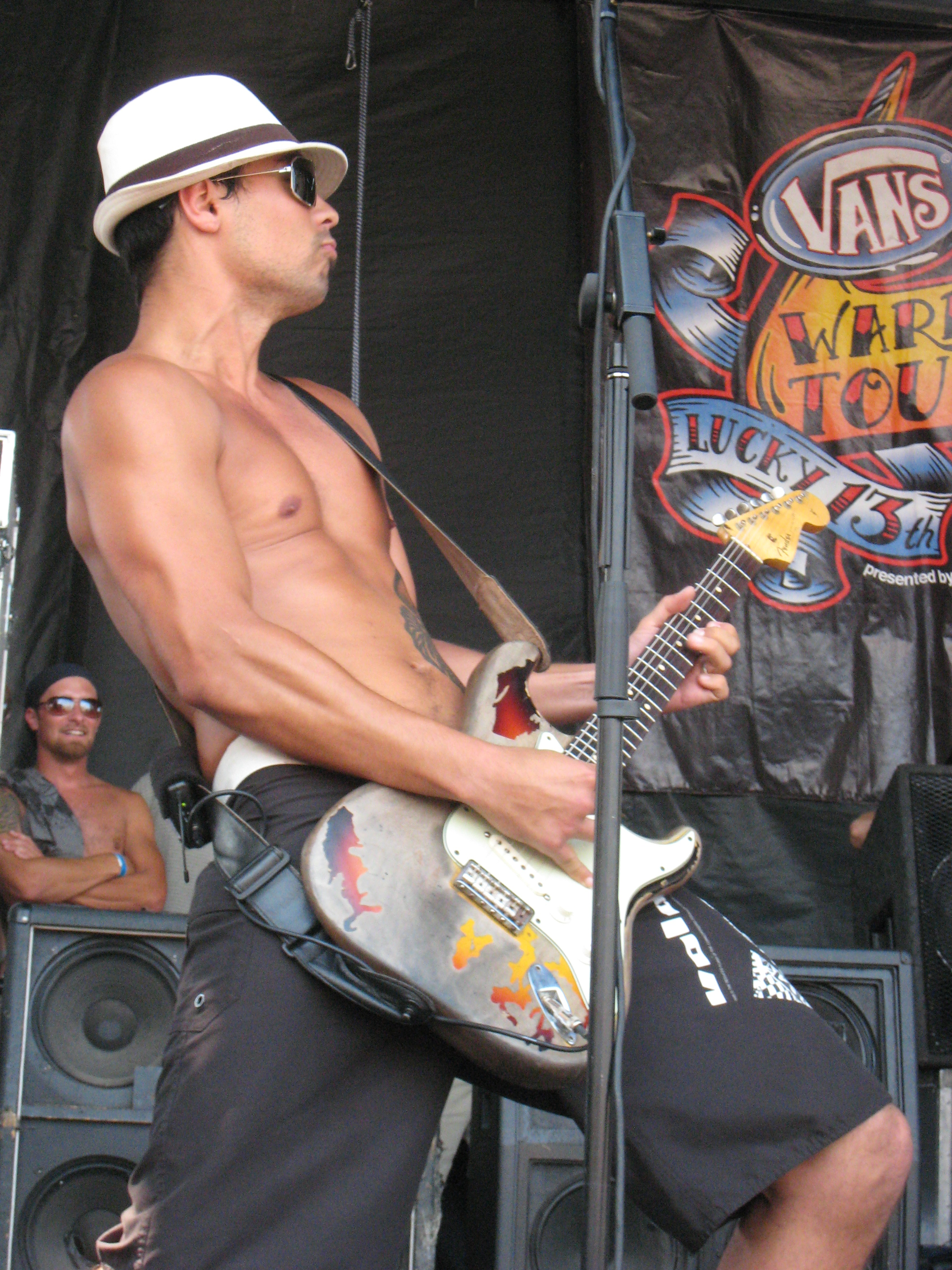
Kaleo Wassman of Pepper performing at Warped Tour in 2007.

Pepper released their fifth album on July 22, 2008, titled Pink Crustaceans and Good Vibrations on their own label, LAW Records. The cover and title was a play on one of their favorite films Broken Lizard's Club Dread. The album peaked at #83 on the Billboard 200 chart.

To promote this release, the band toured across the United States in 2008 from March through April with Redeye Empire and Iration. A European tour in support of Flogging Molly followed, including shows in Germany, Sweden, France, Italy and more. From August 1, 2008, to September 6, 2008, the band toured the U.S. on the Tailgate 2008 Summer Tour. The band then toured with Slightly Stoopid and Sly & Robbie. The band also headlined the "LAW Records" tour in October 2008 along with Passafire, and The Supervillains. This was their first tour consisting of only LAW Records bands. After a UK tour with Less than Jake, and a break in December, Pepper, Passafire, and The Supervillains toured the Northwest to complete the first LAW Records tour.

On April 21, 2009, the band released a greatest hits album called Kona Gold. It featured 19-tracks of Pepper's most popular songs.

The Spring 2009 lineup of the Jägermeister Music Tour featured Pepper with longtime staples on the punk scene, Pennywise. Pepper returned to the Jägermeister Music Tour after a 2006 outing with punk-reggae rockers Slightly Stoopid.

=== 2010–2015: Stitches EP and self-titled album ===
Pepper released their new EP album titled Stitches on October 12, 2010. A single, "Wake Up", from the album was released June 28, 2010, along with "Mirror". The band toured with 311 to promote the album. The EP peaked at #40 on the Billboard Independent Albums chart.

Pepper also toured on the "Like a Surgeon Tour" with Shwayze, Pour Habit, and Brother Ali in the Fall of 2010. They released Like A Surgeon Live on October 9, 2010, which featured 22 songs from their entire performance live during the tour.

Pepper was one of the headliners for the 2011 Vans Warped Tour. During the summer and fall of 2012, they toured with Sublime with Rome and Cypress Hill.

On September 3, 2013, Pepper released their self-titled sixth album on Island Records. It featured the singles, "Hunny Girl" and "F**K Around All Night", which the band shot two music videos for (a clean version and an explicit version with nudity).

Following a co-headlining tour with the Dirty Heads in the summer of 2014 and another amphitheater summer run with Rebelution and Sublime With Rome in 2015.

=== 2016–Present: Ohana and Local Motion ===
On April 29, 2016, Pepper released their seventh studio album titled, Ohana. The album peaked at #8 on the Billboard Independent Albums chart and made it to #130 on the Billboard 200.

The band released their eighth studio album Local Motion on June 28, 2019. It contained 10-tracks featuring top reggae artists like Stick Figure on single "Warning", E.N. Young (formally of Tribal Seeds), Micah Brown of Iration, Henry Fong, and Jinco. The album peaked at #1 on the Billboard Reggae Albums chart and made it to #13 on the Billboard Independent Albums chart.

Pepper was featured as one of many reggae bands on Collie Buddz riddim album, Cali Roots Riddim 2020 with their single, "Change", which was produced by Buddz and mixed by Stick Figure's touring guitarist, producer Johnny Cosmic.

On September 20, 2020, Pepper was one of several reggae and punk bands on The House That Bradley Built, a charity compilation honoring Sublime's lead singer Bradley Nowell, helping musicians with substance abuse. They covered Sublime's songs, "Date Rape", and "Work That We Do", as well as, Brett Bollinger covering "Mary" on the Deluxe Edition which was released on Pepper's own record label, LAW Records on January 15, 2021.

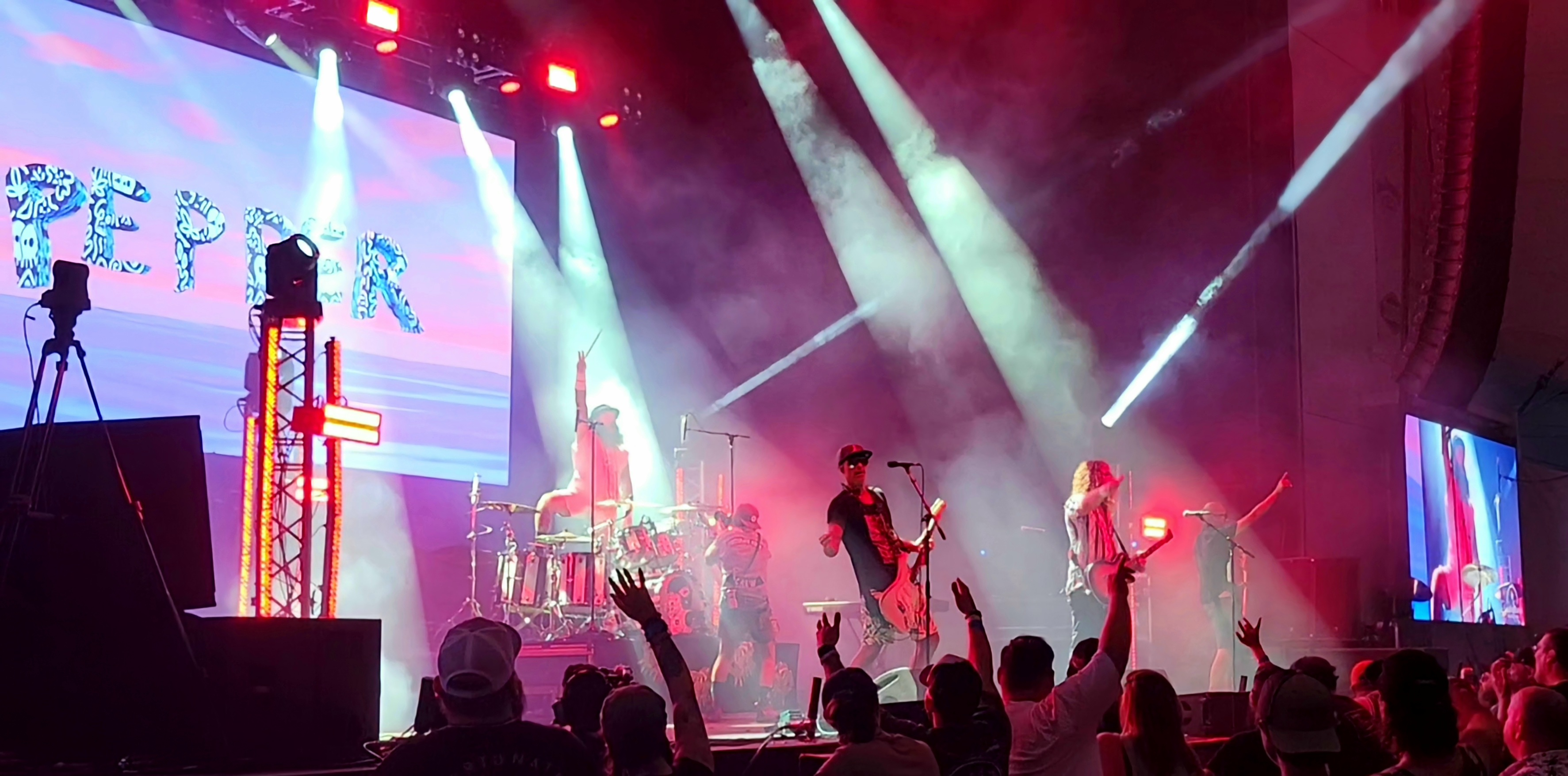
Pepper performing at the Leader Bank Pavilion in Boston, MA (Summer Traditions Tour) on July 28, 2022.

In late 2022 and early 2023, Pepper celebrated their 20th year after their commercial success of their second album, Kona Town. They Kicked off their "Twenty Years of Kona Town" tour with a surprise single drop of "Stormtrooper (Kona Town Revisited)" featuring Josh Swain from The Movement and Kai Boy (formally of Iration). Brett explains, "The song has always had a special place in our hearts with our brother Josh Fischel originally blessing the track, and we are honored to have Josh of The Movement and Kai Rediske former lead singer of Iration to help us revisit and pay homage to the song 20 years later."

On June 2, 2023, Pepper released a single, "Get Me Ready", which, as stated on the band's social media pages, was just a demo first written by Kaleo in 2017 at Tim Armstrong's studio in Silver Lake. The song was finished (co-written) by Tim Armstrong of Rancid and Kevin Bivona from The Interrupters and then recorded five years later with a Two-Tone, ska vibe. The band also released a remixed version, "Get Me Ready" (Aloha Remix) that was produced by Wayne Lothian of The English Beat.

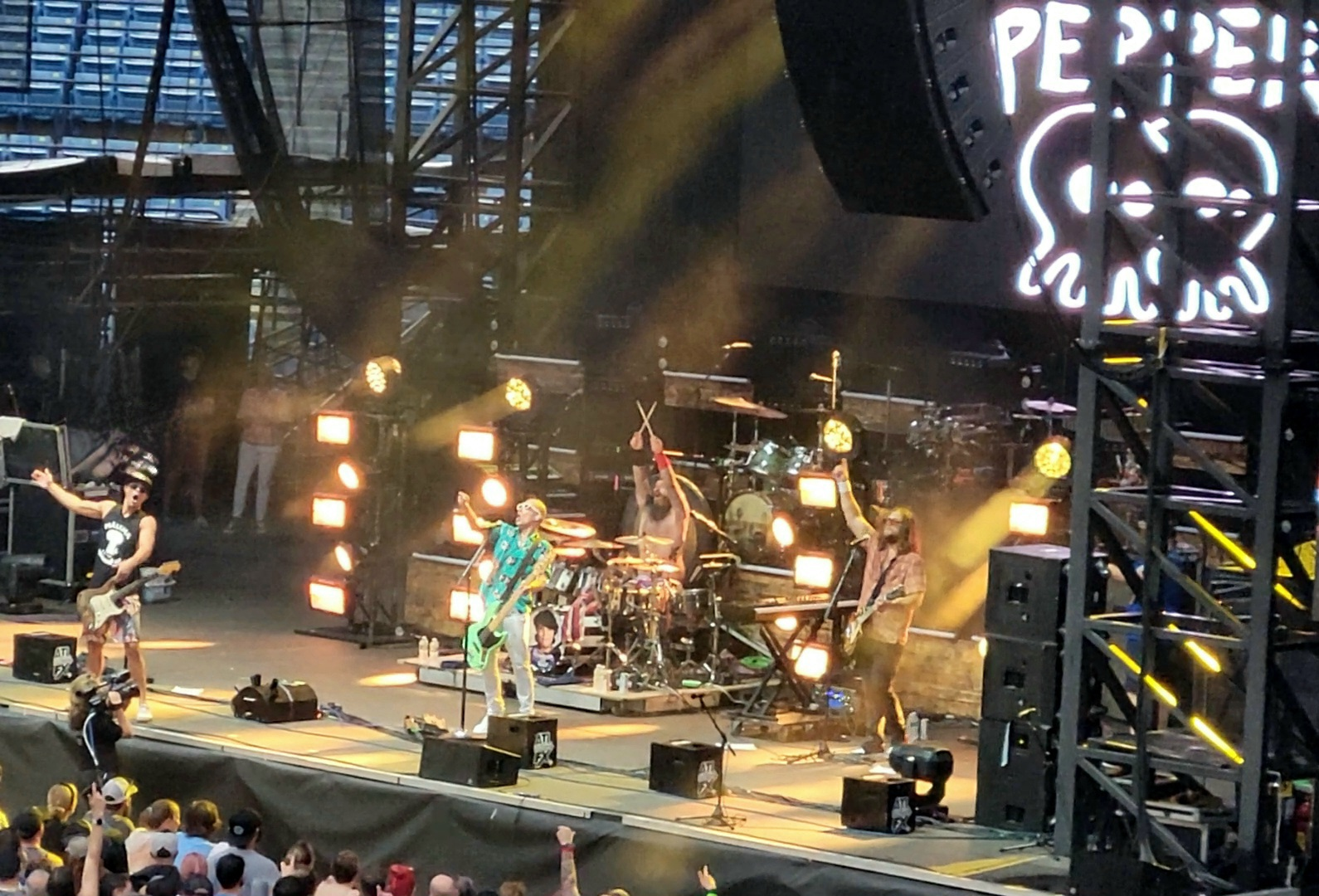
Pepper performing at the Westville Music Bowl in New Haven, CT in July 2023.

On November 17, 2023, Pepper will release a 6-track EP, titled, Makai, which will feature Edley Shine and Iration. The band's third EP will be available on a one-time hand numbered vinyl pressing limited to 250 units of each variant available exclusively through their LAW Records store.

== Other projects ==
In 2016, Pepper tried their hands at winemaking with their own wine collection based on their album titles and cover artwork. The first bottle they released was, "Kona Town Original Blend", which sold quickly.

In 2017, Pepper partnered up with award-winning winemaker Thomas Booth, a.k.a. "The Wine Boss" of Paso Robles, California. Their second bottle, "Blend 2" won Gold at the San Francisco Chronicle Competition in 2019. They also have a 2017 "Skullconut Malbec", and a 2015 Cabernet called, "In With The Cab", which is a play off their album, In With The Old. For two years in a row, they've won Gold, Silver and Bronze for all of their wines.

Kaleo Wassman explains, "We didn't want to just license our name to the wine, we wanted to be active in the creation of it. And so it's really incredible for us to get these awards and accolades because we are being able to co-create this wine with Thomas." They look to add to their success with the release of "No Shame Chardonnay" with artwork based on their 2006 album, No Shame.

In April 2023, Pepper collaborated with surf, skate, music & entertainment clothing company Volcom with a new clothing line called "Volcom x Pepper". It was created with long time Pepper artist and Volcom-sponsored surfer Ben Brough.

== Members ==
- Bret Bollinger – vocals, bass (1996–present)
- Kaleo Wassman – vocals, guitar (1996–present)
- Yesod Williams – drums, backing vocals (1996–present)

== Discography ==
=== Studio albums ===
List of studio albums and chart peaks by Pepper
| Year | Album title | Billboard chart Peaks | | | | | | Release details |
| Year | Album title | US | Ind | Alt | Heat | Taste | Reg | Release details |
|---|---|---|---|---|---|---|---|---|
| 2000 | Give'n It | — | — | — | — | — | — | Released: April 11, 2000 *(Reissued by LAW Records on September 16, 2003); Label: Cornerstone R.A.S.; Format: CD |
| 2002 | Kona Town | — | — | — | — | — | 2 | Released: March 26, 2002; Label: Volcom Entertainment; Format: CD |
| 2004 | In With The Old | — | 18 | — | 34 | — | — | Released: March 30, 2004; Label: Volcom Entertainment; Format: CD |
| 2006 | No Shame | 96 | — | — | — | — | — | Released: October 3, 2006 (reissued by Powerslave Records in Japan in 2008); Label: Atlantic Records, LAW Records; Format: CD, digital |
| 2008 | Pink Crustaceans and Good Vibrations | 83 | 11 | — | — | — | — | Released: July 22, 2008; Label: LAW Records; Format: CD, digital |
| 2013 | Pepper | — | — | — | — | — | — | Released: September 3, 2013; Label: Island Records; Format: CD, digital |
| 2016 | Ohana | 130 | 8 | 7 | — | — | — | Released: April 29, 2016; Label: LAW Records; Format: CD, digital |
| 2019 | Local Motion | — | 13 | — | — | 11 | 1 | Released: June 28, 2019; Label: LAW Records; Format: CD, digital |
"—" denotes a recording that did not chart or was not released in that territory.

=== Demos ===
- Seven-song demo (1997), Pepper Records
- Give'n It (2000), Cornerstone R.A.S.

=== EPs ===
- Limited Edition Warped Tour EP (2001), Volcom Entertainment
- Stitches EP (2010), LAW Records (#40 on Billboard Independent Albums)
- Makai EP (2023), LAW Records

=== Live albums ===
- Kona Gold (2009), Volcom Entertainment
- Live at the Belly Up (2015), LAW Records

=== DVDs ===
- Pepper LIVE DVD (March 8, 2005), Volcom Entertainment
- Searching For The Haj (DVD Movie) (August 22, 2006), LAW Records

=== Compilations ===
- The Early Poems of Volcom Entertainment (1999), Volcom Entertainment
- 1999 Summer Sampler (1999), Volcom Entertainment
- Santa's Stuck in the Chimney (2000), Volcom Entertainment
- 2002 Label Sampler (2002), Volcom Entertainment / 2 tracks: ("Sitting on the Curb", "Storm Trooper")
- To Da Max: Mistakes and Outtakes 1997–2004 (2007), Volcom Entertainment, LAW Records
- Good Luck Chuck Soundtrack (2007), Lions Gate Records / 1 track: ("The Whistle Song")
- Spirits In The Material World: A Reggae Tribute To The Police (2008), Shanachie / 1 track: ("Can't Stand Losing You")

=== Singles ===
List of singles with selected chart positions and certifications, showing year released and album name
| Year | Title | Peak chart positions | Album |
| Year | Title | US Alt | Album |
|---|---|---|---|
| 2002 | "Give It Up" | 34 | Kona Town |
| 2006 | "No Control" | 19 | No Shame |
| 2007 | "Your Face" | — | No Shame |
| 2010 | "Wake Up" | — | Stitches EP |
| 2010 | "Mirror" | — | Stitches EP |
| 2013 | "F**k Around (All Night)" | 21 | Pepper |
| 2013 | "Hunny Girl" | — | Pepper |
"—" denotes single that did not chart or was not released in that territory.

=== Songs ===
- Singles that did not chart/top tracks off each album

| Title | Release date | Album |
|---|---|---|
| "Feels Good" | 2000 | Give'n It |
| "Regret Is" | 2000 | Give'n It |
| "Prank Caller" | 2000 | Give'n It |
| "Kelis Song" | 2000 | Give'n It |
| "Stone Love" | 2002 | Kona Town |
| "The Good Thing" | 2002 | Kona Town |
| "B.O.O.T" | 2002 | Kona Town |
| "Stormtrooper" | 2002 | Kona Town |
| "Too Much" | 2002 | Kona Town |
| "Sitting on the Curb" | 2002 | Kona Town |
| "Tradewinds" | 2002 | Kona Town |
| "Ho's" | 2002 | Kona Town |
| "Border Town" | 2004 | In With The Old |
| "Ashes" | 2004 | In With The Old |
| "Keep Your Head Bangin'" | 2004 | In With The Old |
| "Back Home" | 2004 | In With The Old |
| "Are You Down" | 2004 | In With The Old |
| "Punk Rock Cowboy" | 2004 | In With the Old |
| "7 Weeks" | 2004 | In With The Old |
| "Bring Me Along" | 2006 | No Shame |
| "Rent" | 2006 | No Shame |
| "Like Your Style" | 2006 | No Shame |
| "Point and Shoot" | 2006 | No Shame |
| "Old Time Problem" | 2006 | No Shame |
| "Lost In America" | 2006 | No Shame |
| "Crazy Love" | 2006 | No Shame |
| "Nice Time" | 2006 | No Shame |
| "Wanted" | 2006 | No Shame |
| "Green Hell" | 2006 | No Shame |
| "Things That You Love" | 2008 | Pink Crustaceans and Good Vibrations |
| "Freeze" | 2008 | Pink Crustaceans and Good Vibrations |
| "Stand & Fall" | 2008 | Pink Crustaceans and Good Vibrations |
| "The Phoenix" | 2008 | Pink Crustaceans and Good Vibrations |
| "Do Something" | 2008 | Pink Crustaceans and Good Vibrations |
| "Blackout" | 2008 | Pink Crustaceans and Good Vibrations |
| "Undone" | 2013 | Pepper |
| "Deep Country" | 2013 | Pepper |
| "Illuminate" | 2013 | Pepper |
| "Don't You Know" | 2013 | Pepper |
| "These Hands" | 2013 | Pepper |
| "Never Ending Summer" | 2016 | Ohana |
| "Start You Up" | 2016 | Ohana |
| "Vacation" | 2016 | Ohana |
| "Wait" | 2016 | Ohana |
| "Perfect Stranger" | 2016 | Ohana |
| "Around" | 2016 | Ohana |
| "Warning" (feat. Stick Figure) | 2019 | Local Motion |
| "Candy" | 2019 | Local Motion |
| "My Holiday" (feat. Micah Brown) | 2019 | Local Motion |
| "Carnival" (feat. Henry Fong and Jinco) | 2019 | Local Motion |
| "Sugar" (808 Remix) | 2019 | Local Motion |
| "Goddaughter" (feat. E.N. Young) | 2019 | Local Motion |
| "Neighborhood" | 2019 | Local Motion |
| "Date Rape" (Sublime cover) | January 15, 2021 | The House That Bradley Built (Single) |
| "Work That We Do" (Sublime cover) | January 15, 2021 | The House That Bradley Built (Single) |
| "Mary" (Sublime cover) | January 15, 2021 | The House That Bradley Built: Deluxe Edition (Single) |
| "Stormtrooper (Kona Town Revisited)" (feat. The Movement & Kai Boy) | February 13, 2023 | 20 Years of Kona Town (Single) |
| "Get Me Ready" | June 2, 2023 | Makai EP (Single) |
| "Get Me Ready (Aloha Remix)" | July 13, 2023 | Makai EP (Single) |
| "Stay High" | September 15, 2023 | Makai EP (Single) |
| "Tides" (feat. Iration) | October 27, 2023 | Makai EP (Single) |
