= Ünloco =

American nu metal band

- Origin: Austin, Texas, U.S.
- Genres: Nu metal; alternative metal
- Years active: 1998–2003; 2014; 2016; 2017; 2021; 2026–present
- Labels: Captiva; Maverick
- Members: Joey Dueñas; Peter Navarrete; Mando Ayala; Jorge Dueñas; Raul Garza
- Past members: Marc Serrano; Victor Escareño; Brian Arthur; Ben Benavides; Chris Macias
- Website: unlocomusic.com

Ünloco is an American nu metal band formed in Austin, Texas, in 1998. They have released two studio albums and two EPs.

== History ==
Ünloco was formed in Austin, Texas, in 1998, by singer Joey Dueñas, with Pete Navarrete on drums, Victor Escareño on bass, and Brian Arthur on guitar. In 2000, they released a six-track EP titled Useless through Captiva Records.

After giving John Feldmann of Goldfinger a demo tape, they were signed to the Maverick label. In 2001, they issued their debut full-length album, Healing, which was produced by Johnny K. Soon after, Arthur left to join Goldfinger and was replaced by Marc Serrano.

The band's second studio album, Becoming I, came out in March 2003 and was produced by Andrew Murdock. That year, Ünloco performed at Music as a Weapon II and Ozzfest 2003, among other festivals. The band broke up the same year, with Serrano joining A Dozen Furies and Dueñas forming Anew Revolution.

In July 2014, Ünloco announced a reunion show in Austin, Texas. They released the song "Undone" in 2016, and in March 2017, they performed at SXSW. No further releases materialized, and the band went on an extended hiatus.

In March 2026, Ünloco announced another reunion, and they were set to perform at the Aftershock Festival in October. In May, they announced a tour celebrating the 25th anniversary of their debut album, with performances scheduled for a number of cities in Texas and California between September and December.

== Band members ==
Current

- Joey Dueñas – vocals (1998–2003, 2014–present)
- Pete Navarrete – drums (1998–2003, 2014–present)
- Mando Ayala – guitar (2014–present)
- Jorge Dueñas – bass (2015–present)
- Raul Garza – guitar (2016-present)

Former

- Victor Escareño – bass (1998–2003)
- Marc Serrano – guitar (2001–2003)
- Brian Arthur – guitar (1998–2001)
- Ben Benavides – guitar
- Chris Macias – vocals, bass

== Discography ==
Studio albums

| Title | Album details | Sales |
|---|---|---|
| Healing | Released: March 20, 2001; Label: Maverick | US: 18,000 |
| Becoming I | Released: March 11, 2003; Label: Maverick | US: 22,000 |

EPs

| Title | Album details |
|---|---|
| Ünloco | Released: 1998; Label: Self-released |
| Useless | Released: 2000; Label: Captiva |

Singles

| Title | Year | Peak chart positions | Album |
| Title | Year | US Main. Rock | Album |
|---|---|---|---|
| "Face Down" | 2001 | — | Healing |
| "Failure" | 2003 | 25 | Becoming I |
| "Undone" | 2016 | — | Non-album single |
"—" denotes singles that were not released, or did not chart.
