= Coastin' =

Studio album by Iration
- Released: July 10, 2020
- Genre: Reggae; Reggae Rock
- Length: 49:43
- Label: Three Prong Records

Iration chronology
Iration (2018)	Coastin' (2020)

Coastin' is the seventh studio album by American reggae band Iration, released on July 10, 2020.

== Track listing ==
=== CD Release ===
All tracks are written by Iration, except where noted.

No.	Title	Length
1.	"Coastin'"	3:06
2.	"Contact High"	3:31
3.	"Guava Lane (feat. Eli Mac)"	4:25
4.	"Daylight Saving"	3:11
5.	"Zen Island"	4:24
6.	"Right Here, Right Now (feat. Eric Rachmany and Stick Figure)"	5:13
7.	"Home Tonight"	3:49
8.	"Fancy"	3:20
9.	"If You Only Knew (feat. Common Kings)"	4:21
10.	"Chill Out"	3:56
11.	"Smile"	4:04
12.	"Move Forward"	3:51
13.	"Learn From Me"	2:32

== Charts ==
Year	Chart	Position
2020	Billboard 200	—
2020	Billboard Reggae Albums	2
