= A Concept from Fire =

Studio album by A Dozen Furies
- Released: September 13, 2005
- Recorded: 379 Productions in Garland, Texas
- Genre: Metalcore
- Length: 41:57
- Label: Sanctuary; Divine
- Producer: D. Braxton Henry

A Dozen Furies chronology
Rip the Stars Down EP (2004)	A Concept from Fire (2005)

Professional ratings
Review scores
Source	Rating
Allmusic	3/5 stars

A Concept from Fire is the only studio album by A Dozen Furies. It was released on September 13, 2005.

== Track listing ==
No.	Title	Length
1.	"The Gift"	1:13
2.	"Awake and Lifeless"	3:55
3.	"The Everlasting Grudge"	3:35
4.	"Push Away"	2:34
5.	"A Concept from Fire"	2:52
6.	"An Idea and Some Rope"	2:48
7.	"The Cycle"	3:27
8.	"Into Another Life"	3:56
9.	"Lost in a Fantasy"	3:27
10.	"Nightmare of a Martyr"	4:27
11.	"138"	3:54
12.	"The Ill Will"	5:49
13.	"Wind Me Up (B-side)"	2:57
