= Ronnie King =

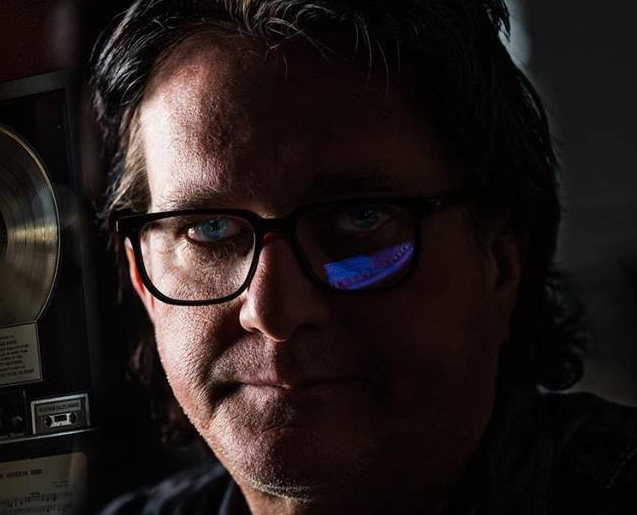
- King in 2013

Background information
- Born: Ronnie King; September 16, 1963 (age 62); Los Angeles, California, United States
- Genres: Pop, pop rock, classical,
- Occupations: Producer, composer, arranger, musician, and philanthropist.
- Instruments: Piano, keyboards, vocals.
- Years active: 1971–present

Ronnie King (born September 16, 1963) is an American musician, producer, composer, arranger, philanthropist, and co-owner of Blue Label Records with Sean Couevas.

== Selected credits ==
- 2Pac, keyboards on Still I Rise, Until the End of Time
- Snoop Dogg, Hammond organ on Paid tha Cost to Be da Bo$$
- Cory Mo
- Slim Thug
- UGK
- Glenna Bell
- Mariah Carey, Moog synthesizer on Rainbow
- Shady Montage (Shade Sheist), keyboards on Shake You Down single
- The Offspring, keyboards on Splinter and Days Go By, live keyboards on 2003 tour
- NOFX, additional guitar on The War on Errorism
- Rancid, live keyboards on 1998 tour
- Pennywise, Freestyle piano on Full Circle's hidden track
- T.S.O.L.
- Bizzy Bone
- The Joykiller, keyboards
- Tyrese, keyboards on I Wanna Go There
- K-Ci & JoJo
- Pepper, keyboards on In With the Old
- Ten West
- Coolio
- Warren G
- Big Syke
- Kaleo from Pepper
- Craig Mack, keyboards on Operation: Get Down
- The Distillers, piano on The Distillers
- Mason Reed
- One11
- Core 10
- Infierno 18 Keyboards on Ya era hora (Argentina)
- Strawberry Moon (producer)
- American Supermodel American Supermodel Keyboards, Producer
- Capybara
