= Healing (Ünloco album) =

Studio album by Ünloco
- Released: March 20, 2001
- Recorded: 2000
- Studio: Groovemaster Studios (Chicago, Illinois)
- Genre: Nu metal
- Length: 45:26
- Label: Maverick
- Producer: Johnny K, Ünloco

Ünloco chronology
Useless (2000)	Healing (2001)	Becoming I (2003)

Singles from Healing
- 1. "Face Down" Released: 2001

Healing is the debut album by the nu metal band Ünloco. It was released on March 20, 2001 via Maverick. Healing embraced an outlandish alternative metal sound, which meshed appropriately with the band's aggressive, angst-ridden lyrics. Ünloco's first single, "Face Down", reflected Maverick's desire to highlight the band's reflective and acoustic edge. The songs "Panic" and "Nothing" were featured in the video game Test Drive: Off-Road Wide Open.

== Reception ==
Commercially, Healing failed to gather mainstream attention, and its release flew under the radar during the nu metal phase of the early 2000s period. AllMusic's Michael Gallucci gave the album a highly negative one-and-a-half-star review, noting "There's no explanation for why anyone should listen to these neo-metal knuckleheads when there is already plenty of other rap-metal macho men doing the same thing."

== Track listing ==
All tracks are written by Ünloco.

No.	Title	Length
1.	"Useless"	3:23
2.	"Clean"	2:57
3.	"Naive"	2:45
4.	"Face Down"	4:05
5.	"Far Side"	4:32
6.	"Panic"	4:13
7.	"Nothing"	2:43
8.	"Know One"	3:35
9.	"Less Of"	3:57
10.	"Reckoning"	3:25
11.	"Whimper"	3:49
12.	"Bystander"	6:02
Total length:		45:26

While the CD credits only the four current band members Joey Duenas, Marc Serrano, Victor Escareno, and Peter Navarrete, the band also verbally credit former guitarist, Brian Arthur, for the writing of multiple songs, but have yet to officially release details specifying which band members wrote which songs.

== Personnel ==
Ünloco

- Jose L. Dueñas – vocals
- Brian Arthur – guitars
- Victor H. Escareño – bass guitar
- Pedro A. Navarrete – drums

Additional personnel

- Johnny K – producer, engineer, mixing
- Tadpele – assistant engineer, digital editing
- Howie Weinberg – mastering
- Guy Oseary – executive producer
- Kim Biggs – art direction, design
- David Harlan – art direction, design
- Alison Dyer – original band photos
