= Tunji =

- Gender: Male
- Language: Yoruba

Origin
- Origin: Nigeria
- Meaning: Re-awake
- Region of origin: South western Nigeria

Tunji audio is a Yoruba male given name. It is loosely interpreted as re-awake. Tunji is also a Zambian {Tonga Tribe} male name which means small many things (potency) Notable people includes

- Tunji Oyelana Nigerian musician
- Tunji Awojobi Nigerian professional basketball player
- Tunji Olurin Former military Governor of Oyo State
- Tunji Kasim Scottish actor
- Tunji Banjo Nigerian-Irish professional footballer
- Tunji Sowande Nigeria-born United Kingdom lawyer and musician
- Tunji Otegbeye Nigerian politician
- Sarafa Tunji Ishola Nigeria's former Minister of Mines and Steel Development
- Tunji Namaiko, PhD a Zambian national who is one of the leading African peace and security experts

== See also ==
- Olatunji
