= Ozzfest =

Annual music festival

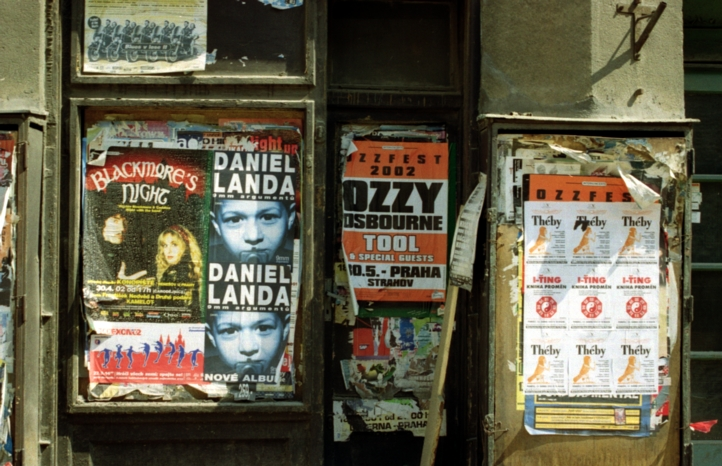
- 2002 Ozzfest concert poster in downtown Prague, Czechia
- Genre: Heavy metal; nu metal; industrial metal; alternative metal; metalcore; extreme metal
- Dates: July–August; November
- Locations: Europe; Japan; United States
- Years active: 1996–2008; 2010; 2013; 2015–2018; 2027
- Founders: Sharon Osbourne
- Website: ozzfest.com

Ozzfest is an annual music festival tour of the United States and sometimes Europe and later Japan, featuring performances by many heavy metal and hard rock musical groups. It was founded by Sharon Osbourne and Ozzy Osbourne, both of whom also organised each yearly tour with their son Jack Osbourne. It was held almost annually between 1996 and 2018. The Ozzfest tour featured bands of a variety of genres within heavy metal and hard rock, including alternative metal, thrash metal, industrial metal, metalcore, hardcore punk, deathcore, nu metal, death metal, post-hardcore, gothic metal and black metal. Ozzy Osbourne and Black Sabbath played the tour several times over the years. Ozzy Osbourne died on 22 July 2025, seventeen days after Black Sabbath's farewell concert. In the wake of Osbourne's passing, there have been calls to revive the festival in his memory. Sharon Osborne told Billboard in early 2026 that she had been negotiating with Live Nation Entertainment in regards to the festival's return as early as 2027. In March 2026, via The Osbournes podcast, Sharon Osbourne announced Ozzfest would return in 2027 for two nights in Birmingham at Villa Park.

== History ==
=== 1996–1999: early years ===
The festival was created in 1996 by Ozzy Osbourne's wife and manager, Sharon Osbourne, after she was rebuffed by Lollapalooza when she tried to get Ozzy on that festival circuit. The tour was well-received, which prompted the festival to become a yearly occurrence.

The first Ozzfest was not a national tour, but rather a two-day festival held in Phoenix, Arizona, and Devore, California, on 25 and 26 October 1996 respectively. Ozzfest Live, a compilation of ten live tracks recorded during this festival, was released on 29 April 1997.

In 1997, there were large protests outside of the festival to cancel Marilyn Manson's performance. However, no dates were cancelled. There were also protests of a similar nature in 2001, following the Columbine High School massacre, which some groups had blamed on Marilyn Manson.

In 1998, Ozzfest ventured outside the United States for the first time into the United Kingdom, which featured a different line-up of bands. The festival would eventually return to the UK in 2001 and 2002.

The 1998 US Tour also featured for the first time an Ozzfest web site. Photographs were made during the tour using an early generation Sony Mavica FD-7 digital camera and uploaded each night after the show, and a tour diary was kept from the road.

The concert on 18 July 1998 at Float Rite Park was merged with Warped Tour 1998. Some 39,000 fans were at the 12-hour, six-stage, 48-band event.

=== 2000–2006: commercial success ===
In the early 2000s, artists and bands including Slipknot, Kittie, Pantera, Marilyn Manson, Mudvayne, Godsmack, Rob Zombie, Incubus, Linkin Park, System of a Down, Chevelle, P.O.D., Papa Roach and Disturbed played the yearly music festival. Two compilation albums of the Ozzfest tour were released, one covering select 2001 performances and another for 2002.

Onstage footage of the Ozzfest 2004 tour was shown on MTV, as Ozzy and Sharon hosted a show on the network titled Battle for Ozzfest where they chose eight out of hundreds of bands to compete for a spot on the following year's Ozzfest. Ozzy selected one member from each chosen band to "tag along" on the tour. Each contestant had to complete numerous challenges to improve his/her band's chances of winning the contest. Occasionally, meetings would be held and certain contestants would be eliminated for various reasons. The person who prevailed as the winner and guaranteed his band's spot on the Ozzfest tour was Marc Serrano from metalcore act A Dozen Furies. Serrano had appeared at Ozzfest the year prior with his former band Ünloco.

At Iron Maiden's last Ozzfest performance, on 20 August 2005 at the Hyundai Pavilion at Glen Helen in San Bernardino, California, several detrimental events took place. During the first song, several members of the crowd, brought on by Sharon Osbourne, bombarded the English metal band Iron Maiden with eggs, bottle caps and ice after vocalist Bruce Dickinson allegedly ridiculed Ozzy's need for a teleprompter during his performances, as well as the Osbourne family's ventures into reality television (The Osbournes, Battle for Ozzfest). During three of Iron Maiden's songs, the P.A. system was switched off, cutting power to Dickinson's microphone and then to all the band's instruments. During the concert, Bruce Dickinson can be heard accusing the festival's organizers of deliberately cutting off the band's power. On Iron Maiden's departure, Sharon Osbourne came on stage to make a few statements, telling the audience that she "absolutely loved Iron Maiden" but thought that Dickinson is a "prick." Rod Smallwood, manager for Iron Maiden, issued a statement shortly after the debacle condemning the attack on the band. In 2006, Bruce Dickinson commented, "Did I have a go at Ozzy and Black Sabbath? No. Why would I? But I do find The Osbournes TV series loathsome, and the whole cult of reality TV celebrities disgusting." In response to claims that he had apologised to Ozzy for Dickinson's behaviour, Steve Harris stated "No I didn't [apologise]. What I actually said was that, if there was anything to apologise for, then I'd do it. But that was twisted around to seem like I'd said sorry – that never happened!"

=== 2007: free fest ===
On 7 February 2007, it was announced that tickets to Ozzfest 2007 would be offered free of charge, dubbing the 2007 Ozzfest as "free fest." Tickets were made available through sponsor websites, the Ozzfest web site and to those buying an advance copy of Ozzy Osbourne's new release, Black Rain.

Sponsorship money provided the revenue for the tour, but organizers did not pay any of the bands appearing. Ozzy Osbourne returned to the headlining slot on the tour after only headlining the second stage in 2006. Ozzfest 2007 featured well-established acts such as Lamb of God, Static-X, and Hatebreed.

There were problems with distribution of the free tickets. Fans were given codes to receive tickets through the official Ozzfest website, but due to the heavy load on Live Nation's secure servers, there were issues with ticket redemption. Another problem was that many "eBay scalpers" charged fans to pay for the free tickets, often turning out to be unusable duplicates of other tickets. Then, on 26 July, Ozzfest gave away free tickets without requiring its "redemption code" previously required.

At the show of 16 August 2007 in Holmdel, New Jersey, at the PNC Bank Arts Center, controversy was generated as 83 attendees were arrested at the show, most of them underage and arrested prior to 8:00. In addition, two men died, one after overdosing on alcohol and energy drinks.

=== 2008–2018: final decade and future ===
==== 2008 ====
Questions over whether the event would be held in 2008 began when in April that year Ozzy Osbourne announced that he would be headlining the Canadian Monsters of Rock festival. The 2008 version of the festival took place for only one date at Pizza Hut Park in Frisco, Texas on 9 August 2008. The line-up featured Metallica and Ozzy Osbourne as the headliner bands, as well as other acts such as Jonathan Davis (frontman of Korn), Sevendust, DevilDriver, Serj Tankian (frontman of System of a Down), Cavalera Conspiracy, Shadows Fall, Apocalyptica and In This Moment. Along with the two main stages was a third, named the Texas Stage, which, according to Sharon Osbourne, featured such Texas-based bands as The Sword, Drowning Pool, Goatwhore, Soilent Green and Rigor Mortis.

The Canadian Version of "The Monsters of Rock" was held exclusively on 26 July 2008 at the McMahon Stadium located in Calgary, Alberta, Canada. It was also scheduled as a "one time only" event. The main attraction for the festival of heavy metal and mayhem were metal giants Judas Priest and the headliner, Ozzy Osbourne. In addition, various other "big league" heavy metal outfits attended the festivities. The following bands preceded the two main attractions: Serj Tankian, Hatebreed, Cavalera Conspiracy, Shadows Fall, Canadian metal unit Voivod, Testament, 3 Inches of Blood, Priestess, Zimmers Hole, and Dillinger Escape Plan.

==== 2010 ====
Main Stage: Ozzy Osbourne, Mötley Crüe, Halford, DevilDriver, Nonpoint

Monster Energy Second Stage: Black Label Society (cancelled in Mansfield & Camden and Bristow due to inclement weather), Drowning Pool (canceled in Mansfield due to inclement weather, Kingdom of Sorrow (Exodus played instead on the San Bernardino date), Goatwhore (canceled on the Hartford date due to a medical emergency with their bassist), Skeletonwitch, Saviours, Kataklysm (canceled in Mansfield due to inclement weather), California Wildebeest (San Bernardino date only), Immune (San Bernardino date only). The guitar prodigy Yuto Miyazawa was invited by Ozzy to play "Crazy Train" at the event.

==== 2013 ====
On 19 October 2012, it was announced that Ozzfest will be revived on 11–12 May 2013 at Makuhari Messe in Chiba, Japan; this was the first time the festival took place in that country. Acts confirmed for the Ozzfest Japan include Slipknot, Slash featuring Myles Kennedy and The Conspirators, Deftones, Black Sabbath, Tool and Stone Sour.

==== 2015 ====
Tokyo, Japan. This was the second time the festival has taken place in the country. Acts that played at Ozzfest Japan include Ozzy and Friends, Korn, Evanescence, Jane's Addiction, Bullet for My Valentine, A Day to Remember, Hatebreed, Black Label Society, Corey Taylor, Crossfaith, and Babymetal.

Originally, Black Sabbath was announced, but it was cancelled and replaced by Ozzy and Friends. Geezer Butler, Tom Morello, Dave Navarro, Zakk Wylde, and Funassyi appeared as guests of Ozzy and Friends. Of Mice and Men was once announced, but they cancelled due to surgery of Austin Carlile.

==== 2016 ====
In 2016, Ozzfest joined with Knotfest and on 24 and 25 September 2016, "Ozzfest Meets Knotfest 2016" was held in San Bernardino, California, at the San Manuel Amphitheater.

==== 2017 ====
The 2017 Ozzfest was held again in conjunction with Knotfest, under the title "Ozzfest Meets Knotfest 2017" on 4 and 5 November 2017, in San Bernardino, California, at the Glen Helen Amphitheater.

==== 2018 ====
The 2018 Ozzfest was held at The Forum in Inglewood, California, on 31 December 2018. The event was hosted by Ozzy Osbourne, Marilyn Manson, Rob Zombie, Jonathan Davis of Korn, and Body Count. And on the second stage, Zakk Wylde's Black Sabbath tribute band Zakk Sabbath took the stage along with DevilDriver and Wednesday 13 of Murderdolls.

==== Future ====
Following the death of Ozzy Osbourne on 22 July 2025, seventeen days after Black Sabbath's farewell concert and in the wake of this after calls to revive the festival in his memory, Sharon Osbourne announced Ozzfest would return in 2027 for two nights in Birmingham at Villa Park.

== See also ==
- Ozzfest lineups by year
