= Pink Crustaceans and Good Vibrations =

Studio album by Pepper
- Released: July 22, 2008
- Recorded: Total Access Recording in Redondo Beach, California
- Label: Law Records

Pepper chronology
To Da Max - Mistakes and Outtakes (1997-2004) (2007)	Pink Crustaceans and Good Vibrations (2008)

Professional ratings
Review scores
Source	Rating
Allmusic	3.5/5 stars
Altsounds	(6/10)
Brain Dead Media	(6.5/10)

Pink Crustaceans and Good Vibrations is the fifth studio album from Pepper released on July 22, 2008. The title is taken from a fictional album recorded by "Coconut Pete" in the Broken Lizard film Club Dread. The album is produced by Paul Leary. Keyboards by Ronnie King.

== Track listing ==
1. "Freeze" - 3:24
2. "Davey Jones Locker" - 3:39
3. "Things That You Love" - 3:45
4. "Wet Dreams" - 2:31
5. "Love 101" - 2:35
6. "Lucy" - 3:28
7. "Musical 69" - 2:53
8. "The Phoenix" - 3:47
9. "Do Something" - 2:36
10. "Slave" - 2:46
11. "Ambition" - 3:32
12. "Stand And Fall" - 3:00
13. "Blackout" - 2:20
14. "Drive" - 7:12

== Production ==
- Producer - Paul Leary
- Engineer - Wyn Davis, Mike Sutherland
- Mixing - Wyn Davis
- Assistant Engineer - Adam Arnold

== Charts ==
Album - Billboard (North America)

Year	Chart	Position
2008	Billboard 200	83
