= 2Cents =

American metal band

- Origin: Malibu, California, United States
- Genres: Heavy metal; nu metal; hardcore punk
- Years active: 1996–present
- Labels: Gotizm, Atlantic, Eight-O-Five Records
- Members: Adam O'Rourke; Dave O'Rourke; Adair Cobley; Jason Wendell; Dan "DeeRock" Racadio; Willis Mathiasen
- Website: www.2centsmusic.com

2Cents is a metal band from Malibu, California. The band is known for their energetic live performances and extensive touring history.

== History ==
2Cents was formed by brothers, Adam and Dave O’Rourke who shared a mutual love of metal bands like Pantera and Slayer as well as Southern California punk bands such as Pennywise and Black Flag. The band released their first album Victims Of Pop Culture on Centsless Records in 2003.

The band first gained national attention with the release of Lost At Sea on Gotizm/Atlantic Records in the summer of 2006. The record, produced by veteran producer Matt Hyde, received positive reviews from the metal community but little promotion from the label. The band took matters into their own hands, embarking on a grueling tour schedule for over two years which found 2Cents appearing at festivals such as Rock on the Range and the HFStival with some of the biggest names in the metal and rock world. They also appeared on major package tours like Sounds of the Underground and gained attention by performing at several maximum security youth facilities.

In 2009, the band returned to the studio with Matt Hyde and signed with Eight O Five Records, releasing Dress To Kill digitally on December 1, 2009. The record was released physically in January 2010. In the fall of 2009, to support the new record, 2cents joined the “Shock and Raw” tour. In the spring of 2010, 2Cents opened on Korn's Jägermeister Tour. In the fall of 2010, they opened on Zakk Wylde's Black Label Berzerkus tour.

By 2011, 2Cents had performed with many notable artists including Alice Cooper, Rob Zombie, Killswitch Engage, Chevelle, Danzig, DragonForce, God Forbid, Five Finger Death Punch, Gwar, Three Days Grace, Buckcherry, Korn, Otep, Pennywise, Rise Against, Shadows Fall, Children of Bodom, Black Label Society, Static-X, Seasons After and Clutch.

Despite teasing "new songs on their way soon" in 2011 on the band's Facebook page, Adam O'Rourke announced in January 2013 that the band is entering an indefinite hiatus due to "an injury I sustained to my voice."

== Members ==
Current

- Adam O’Rourke – lead vocals, drums
- Dave O’Rourke – guitar, vocals
- Jason Wendell – bass
- Adair Cobley – guitar
- Dan "DeeRock" Racadio – sampler, keyboard
- Willis Mathiasen – drums

Former

- Will Whitlock – vocals (1996–1997)
- Jim Harris – bass (1996–2003)
- Brandon Jenner – bass (2003–2004)
- Jesse Fishman – bass (2004–2008)
- Dean Woodward – guitar (2001–2008)

== Discography ==
=== Studio albums ===
- Victims of Pop Culture (2003)
- Lost at Sea (2006)
- Dress to Kill (2009)

=== Singles ===
Year	Title	Peak chart positions	Album
Year	Title	US Main.	Album
2010	"Get What?"	31	Dress to Kill
2010	"Now You Know"	—	Dress to Kill
2010	"Dressed to Kill"	—	Dress to Kill
