= Dress to Kill (2Cents album) =

Studio album by 2Cents
- Released: December 1, 2009
- Genre: Nu metal
- Length: 45:24
- Label: Eight O Five Records
- Producer: Matt Hyde, Chris Rakestraw, 2Cents

Professional ratings
Review scores
Source	Rating
Allmusic	2.5/5 stars

Dress to Kill is the third studio album by American hardcore punk band 2Cents. It was released on December 1, 2009, through Eight O Five Records.

== Track listing ==
Dress to Kill
No.	Title	Length
1.	"Dressed To Kill"	3:33
2.	"Love Like A Riot"	3:22
3.	"Come And Get It"	4:04
4.	"Deeply, Madly"	3:46
5.	"Wicked By Design"	3:48
6.	"Now You Know"	4:06
7.	"The Distance Traveled"	4:02
8.	"Get What?"	3:22
9.	"Shes Gone"	3:31
10.	"Choose Your Illusions"	2:47
11.	"Tear Down Your Reasons"	3:53
12.	"Death Vegas"	3:55
13.	"The Hollow"	3:15

== Personnel ==
- Adam O’Rourke – lead vocals, drums
- Dave O’Rourke – guitar, vocals
- Jason Wendell – bass
- Adair Cobley – guitar
