= Dressed to Kill Tour =

Dressed to Kill Tour may refer to:

- Dressed to Kill Tour (Cher), 2014
- Dressed to Kill Tour (Kiss), 1975
