= Give'n It =

Studio album by Pepper
- Released: April 11, 2000 (demo); September 16, 2003 (reissue)
- Recorded: 1999, at the Kailua-Kona jags Studio
- Genre: Reggae
- Label: Volcom Entertainment Cornerstone RAS

Pepper chronology
Give'n It (2000)	Kona Town (2002)

Professional ratings
Review scores
Source	Rating
Allmusic	link

Give'n It was originally a demo released by the band Pepper in 2000. The demo was released on Cornerstone RAS. It was eventually reissued by the band's label LAW Records in 2003.

== Track listing ==
1. Unsafe Bridge
2. Feels Good
3. Regret Is
4. Prank Caller
5. Reverse
6. No Reason
7. Kelis Song
8. Forever
9. Your Way
10. Do This
11. Bad Idea
12. Ho's (Live)
13. Bonefire (Live)
14. 4 (Live)
15. Splooge (Acoustic)
16. D-425 (Acoustic)
17. Loving Arms (Acoustic)
18. Ho's (Acoustic)
19. Sitting on the Curb (Acoustic)

(Tracks 1–11 are the original release as opposed to 12–19 that are only on the 2003 reissue)
