= No Shame (Pepper album) =

Studio album by Pepper
- Released: October 3, 2006
- Genre: Pop rock; reggae; ska
- Length: 51:27
- Label: Law; Atlantic
- Producer: Nick Hexum; Paul Leary; Pepper; Tony Kanal; Zack Barnhorst

Pepper chronology
| In with the Old (2004) | No Shame (2006) | Pink Crustaceans and Good Vibrations (2008) |

Singles from No Shame
- 1. "No Control" Released: 2006; 2. "Your Face" Released: 2007

Professional ratings
Review scores
| Source | Rating |
|---|---|
| AllMusic | 3.5/5 stars |
| IGN | 7.8/10 |
| PopMatters | 6/10 |

No Shame is the fourth studio album by Hawaiian reggae/rock band Pepper. It was released on October 3, 2006, via Atlantic Records, marking the group's major-label debut. Production was handled by Paul Leary, Nick Hexum, Tony Kanal, Zack Barnhorst, and the band themselves. The album peaked at number 96 on the Billboard 200 chart in the United States. Its lead single, "No Control", made it to number 19 on the Alternative Airplay chart. The song "Bring Me Along" was later included in TMNT: Teenage Mutant Ninja Turtles (Music from the Motion Picture).

The album was re-released on July 9, 2008, through Powerslave Records in Japan, with two bonus tracks and a DVD featuring music videos for "No Control" and "Your Face".

== Track listing ==
All tracks are written by Pepper, except tracks 1, 2, 3 and 5 additionally written with Zach Barnhorst.

| No. | Title | Producer(s) | Length |
|---|---|---|---|
| 1. | "Bring Me Along" | Zach Barnhorst; Pepper | 3:32 |
| 2. | "Rent" | Tony Kanal | 3:38 |
| 3. | "No Control" | Paul Leary | 3:12 |
| 4. | "Green Hell" | Paul Leary | 3:30 |
| 5. | "Lost in America" | Paul Leary | 2:02 |
| 6. | "UFA Point (Skit)" | | 1:25 |
| 7. | "Your Face" | Nick Hexum | 3:22 |
| 8. | "Nice Time" | Nick Hexum | 2:50 |
| 9. | "Crazy Love" | Paul Leary | 2:56 |
| 10. | "Like Your Style" | Nick Hexum | 3:43 |
| 11. | "Point and Shoot" | Nick Hexum | 4:10 |
| 12. | "Old Time Problem" | Paul Leary; Michael Patterson (add.) | 3:36 |
| 13. | "Beers (Skit)" | | 0:33 |
| 14. | "Outta My Face" | Paul Leary | 2:28 |
| 15. | "Wanted" | Nick Hexum | 3:14 |
| 16. | "Good Enough" | Nick Hexum | 2:17 |
| 17. | "Zicky's Song" | Paul Leary | 3:45 |
| 18. | "Intro (Skit)" | | 1:14 |
| Total length: | | | 51:27 |

== Charts ==
| Chart (2006) | Peak position |
|---|---|
| US Billboard 200 | 96 |
