= Prove It (album) =

Studio album by The Expendables
- Released: May 11, 2010
- Recorded: Santa Cruz, California
- Genre: Punk rock, surf rock, reggae, ska
- Label: Stoopid

The Expendables chronology
The Expendables (2007)	Prove It (2010)

Prove It is the fifth studio album by The Expendables. The album was released on May 11, 2010, three years after their fourth studio album.

== Track listing ==
1. How Many Times - 2:28
2. Get What I Need - 3:54
3. Come Get High - 4:25
4. Trying to Focus - 3:39
5. Mr. Sun - 3:26
6. Positive Mind - 3:18
7. Night Mission - 4:31
8. Corporate Cafeteria - 1:04
9. Dance Girl Dance - 3:16
10. No Higher Ground - 3:06
11. Brother - 4:51
12. Donkey Show - 3:58
13. I Ain't Ready - 4:19
14. D.C.B. - 4:59
15. Mind Control - 2:55
16. Wells - 5:21
17. 2 Inch Dub - 16:43
- iTunes Edition

18. One Drop - 4:09
19. Wells (acoustic) - 4:28

== Production ==
Aaron "El Hefe" Abeyta - Composer, Producing, Pre-Production, Mixing
Kevin LemonPre - Production
Brian "Big Bass" Gardner - Mastering
Oguer "O.G." Ocon - Percussion, Guest Appearance
Daniel Delacruz - Saxophone, Guest Appearance
Matt Vanallen - Engineer, Rainstick, Guest Appearance
Ben Moore - Engineer, Drum Technician
Favio Montes - Guitar Technician
Christofer "C-Money" Welter - Trumpet, Guest Appearance
Josh Rice - Keyboards, Guest Appearance
Shaun Logan - Art Direction
G. Love - Harmonica, Vocals, Guest Appearance
Chris DiBeneditto - Tracking
Mark Boyce - Keyboards, Guest Appearance
Chad Jenkins - Photography
Bryan Crabtree - Photography
Ryan Moran - Vibraphone, Guest Appearance
The Expendables - Composer
Garrett Dutton - Composer
Paul Leary - Producer, Mixing
Donovan Haney - Dub Effects
