= In with the Old =

In With the Old

Studio album by Pepper
- Released: March 30, 2004
- Recorded: The Hive, September & October 2003
- Genre: Reggae
- Length: 41:32
- Label: Volcom Entertainment
- Producer: Zach Barnhorst, Richard Woolcott

Pepper chronology
Kona Town (2002)	In With the Old (2004)	No Shame (2006)

Professional ratings
Review scores
Source	Rating
AllMusic	3.5/5 stars

In With the Old is Pepper's third album, released on March 30, 2004 (see 2004 in music).

== Track listing ==
1. "Back Home" – 3:12
2. "Are You Down?" – 3:55
3. "Love Affair" – 3:23
4. "Use Me" – 4:07
5. "Seven Weeks" – 3:43
6. "Ashes" – 3:01
7. "Border Town" – 3:39
8. "Wanna Know You" – 2:57
9. "Keep Your Head Bangin" – 3:03
10. "Your 45" – 3:36
11. "Punk Rock Cowboy" – 3:25
12. "Look What I Found" – 3:31

== Personnel ==
- Zach Barnhorst - Guitar, Engineer, Mixing, Vocal Engineer, Vocal Producer
- Bret Bollinger - Bass, Vocals, Group Member
- Joe Gastwirt - Mastering
- Ryan Immegart - Photography, Layout Design, A&R
- Ronnie King - Keyboards
- Michael Nobrega - A&R
- Ron St. Germain - Producer
- Pepper - Arranger
- Kaleo Wassman - Guitar, Vocals, Group Member
- Yesod Williams - Percussion, Drums, Group Member
- Richard Woolcott - Executive Producer

== Charts ==
Album - Billboard (North America)

Year	Chart	Position
2004	Top Heatseekers	34
2004	Top Independent Albums	18
