= Kona Town (album) =

Studio album by Pepper
- Released: March 26, 2002
- Genre: Reggae; reggae rock; alternative rock; ska-punk; reggae punk
- Length: 46:26
- Label: Volcom Entertainment

Pepper chronology
| Give'n It (2000) | Kona Town (2002) | In With the Old (2004) |

Singles from Kona Town
- 1. "Stone Love" Released: 2002; 2. "Give It Up" Released: 2005

Professional ratings
Review scores
| Source | Rating |
|---|---|
| AllMusic | 3/5 stars |

Kona Town is the debut studio album by American reggae band Pepper. The album title is a reference to the town of Kailua-Kona on the Big Island of Hawaiʻi.

In February and March 2023, the band went on tour to celebrate the 20th anniversary of the album and released a limited edition 20th anniversary vinyl pressing.

== Track listing ==
1. "The Good Thing" - 0:26
2. "Stone Love" - 4:14
3. "Dry Spell" - 3:55
4. "Face Plant" - 3:19
5. "Tradewinds" - 4:16
6. "Stormtrooper" - 5:27
7. "Ho's" - 3:27
8. "B.O.O.T." - 4:08
9. "Give It Up" - 3:21
10. "Sitting on the Curb" - 3:02
11. "Too Much" - 3:24
12. "Tongues" - 3:35
13. "Office" - 3:52

== Reception ==
The album has been described as "good beach music", and has often been compared to the works of Sublime.
