= A Dozen Furies =

American metalcore band

- Origin: Dallas, Texas, U.S.
- Genre: Metalcore
- Years active: 2004–2006
- Label: Sanctuary
- Past members: Bucky Garrett; Marc Serrano; Joey Turner; Keith Reber; Mike Miller

A Dozen Furies was an American metalcore band from Dallas, Texas. They were the winners of the 2004 MTV reality show Battle for Ozzfest. They were awarded a spot on the 10th anniversary of Ozzfest as well as a record deal with Sanctuary Records. They released one studio album, A Concept from Fire, on September 13, 2005, before disbanding in 2006. Members have gone in different directions while still remaining friends.

== Band members ==
- Bucky Garrett – vocals
- Marc Serrano – guitar
- Joey Turner – guitar
- Keith Reber – bass
- Mike Miller – drums

== Discography ==
- Rip the Stars Down (EP, 2004)
- A Concept from Fire (2005)
