= List of dub artists =

Dub is a subgenre of reggae which developed in the late 1960s and early 1970s.

This is a list of notable dub musicians, singers and producers.

== 0–9 ==
- 10 Foot Ganja Plant
- 340ml

== A ==
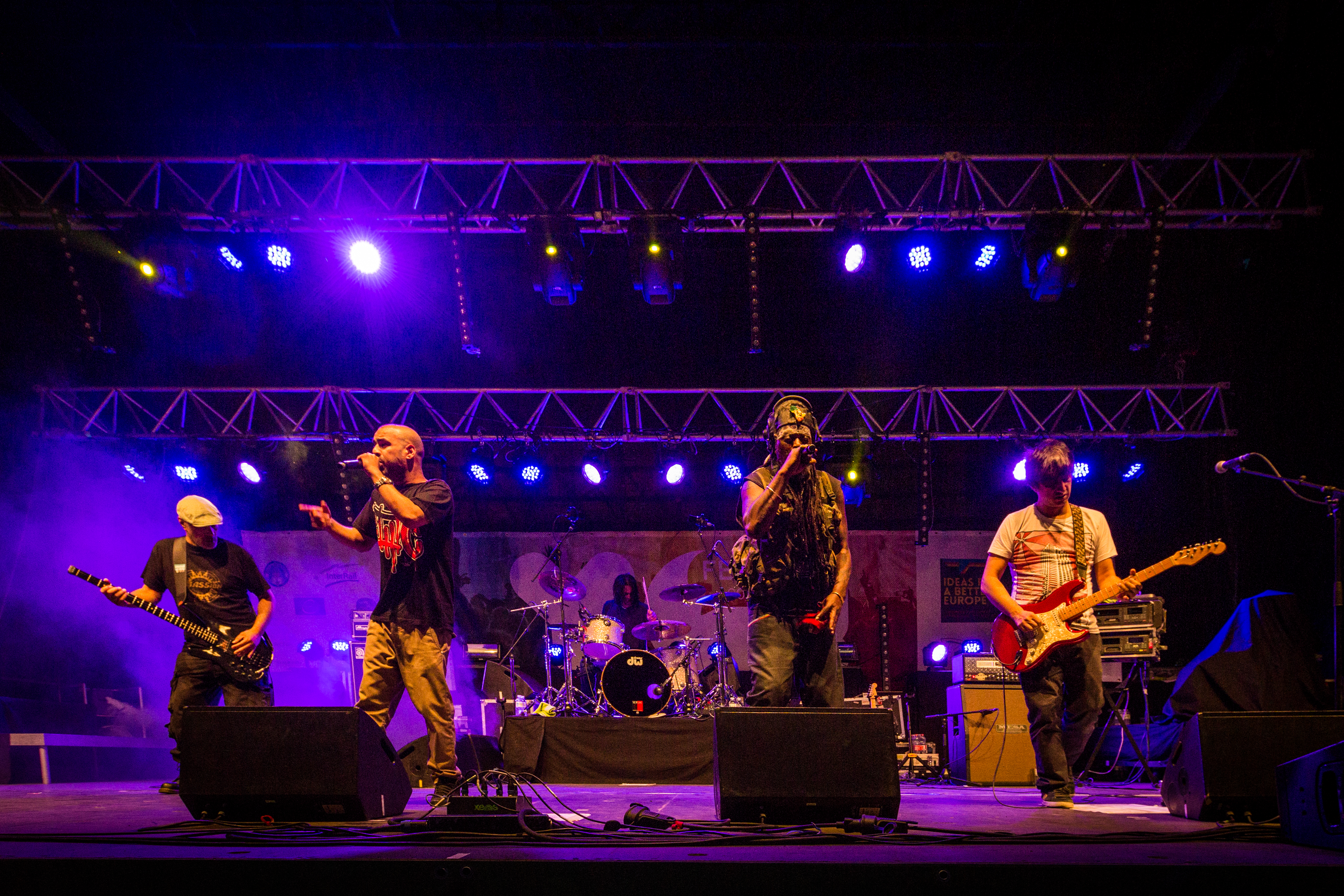
Asian Dub Foundation, 2014

- The Aggrovators
- Augustus Clarke
- Augustus Pablo
- Audio Active
- Alpha & Omega
- Asian Dub Foundation
- African Head Charge
- Aswad
- Alborosie
- Adrian Sherwood

== B ==
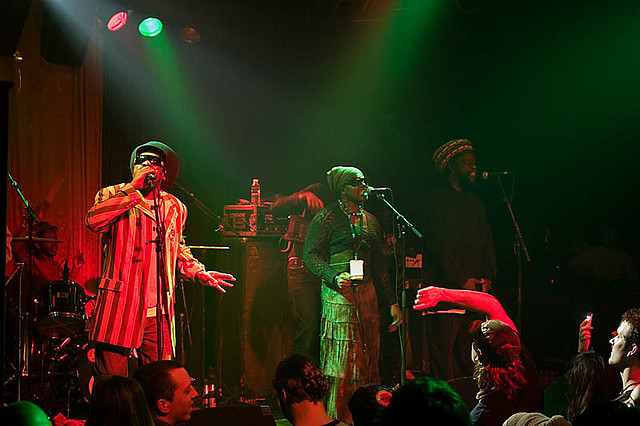
Black Uhuru, 2007

- Banco de Gaia
- Basque Dub Foundation
- Beats Antique
- Beats International
- Bedouin Soundclash
- Bim Sherman
- The Black Seeds
- Black Uhuru
- Blind Idiot God
- Boom One Records
- Brain Damage
- Burning Spear
- Bush Chemists
- Dennis Bovell
- Glen Brown

== C ==
- Chuck Fenda
- The Clash

== D ==
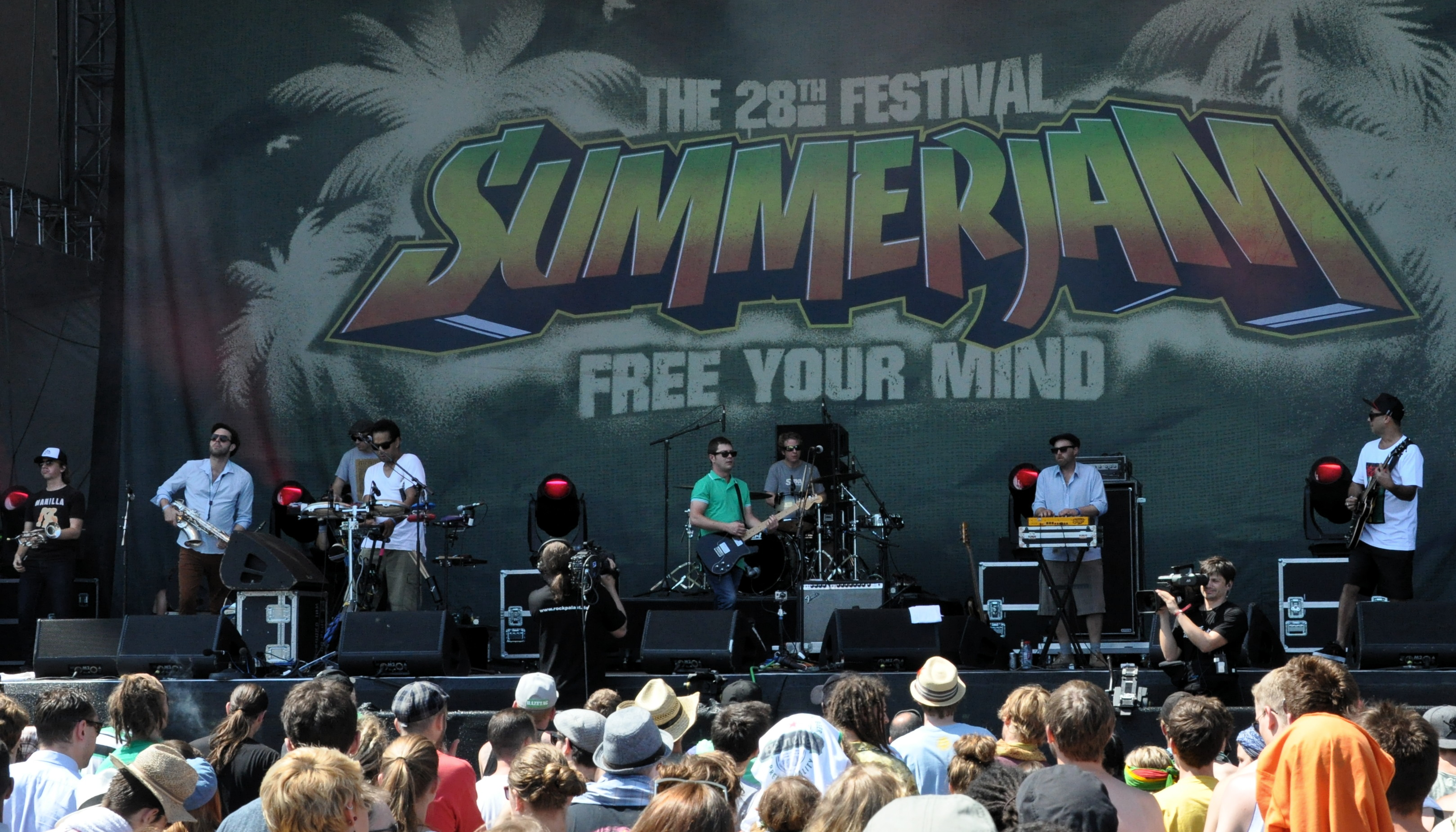
The Black Seeds, 2013

- Dan-I
- Darkwood Dub
- De Facto
- Digital Mystikz
- Dirty Heads
- The Disciples
- Doctah X
- Doof
- The Drastics
- Dreadzone
- Dry & Heavy
- Dub FX
- Dub Incorporation
- Dub Pistols
- Dub Trio
- Dub Syndicate
- Dubioza Kolektiv
- Dubtribe

== E ==
- Easy Star All-Stars
- The Expendables

== F ==
- Fat Freddy's Drop
- Fishmans
- The Flying Lizards
- Free Moral Agents

== G ==
- Gaudi
- Gentleman's Dub Club
- Godflesh
- Grace Jones
- Groundation
- Giant Panda Guerilla Dub Squad

== H ==
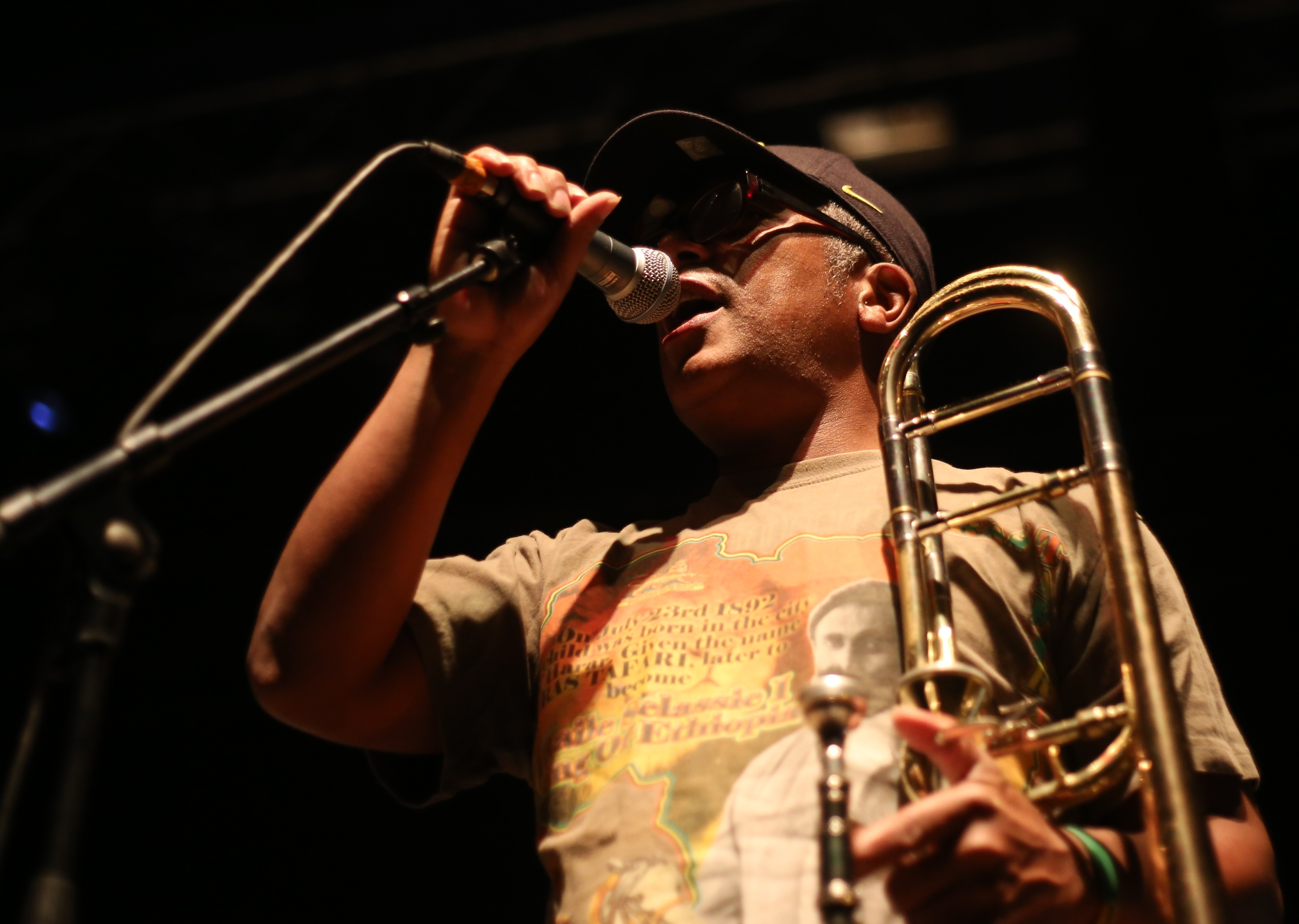
Horace Andy, 2013

- Derrick Harriott
- High Tone
- Keith Hudson
- Horace Andy

== I ==
- illScarlett
- International Observer
- Iration
- Israel Vibration

== J ==
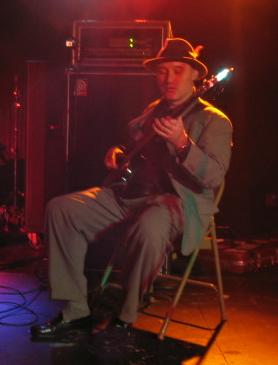
Jah Wobble, 2006

- Jah Shaka
- Jah Wobble
- Joe Gibbs
- Linton Kwesi Johnson
- Junior Reid

== K ==
- Katchafire
- King Jammy
- King Midas Sound
- King Tubby
- King Shiloh

== L ==
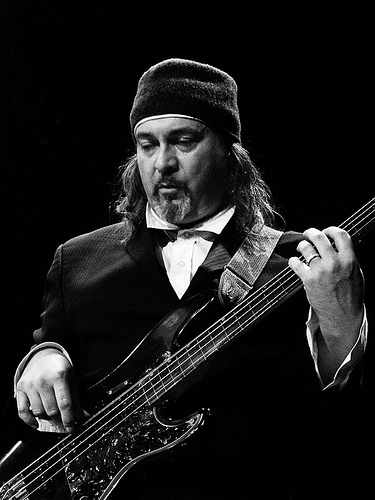
Bill Laswell, 2006

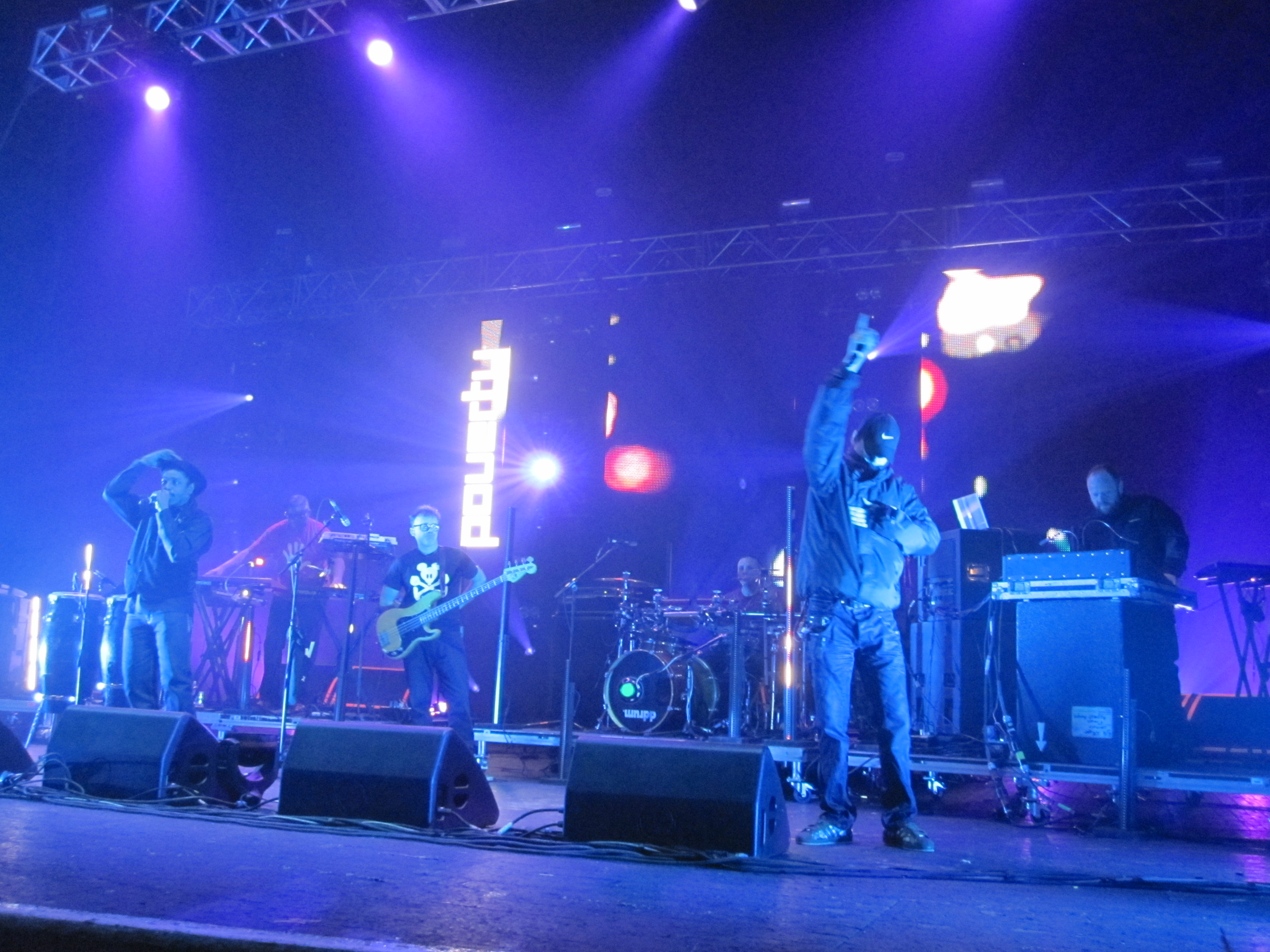
Leftfield, 2010

- Bill Laswell
- Bunny Lee
- Leftfield
- Liondub
- Don Letts
- Long Beach Dub Allstars
- Lucky Dube

== M ==
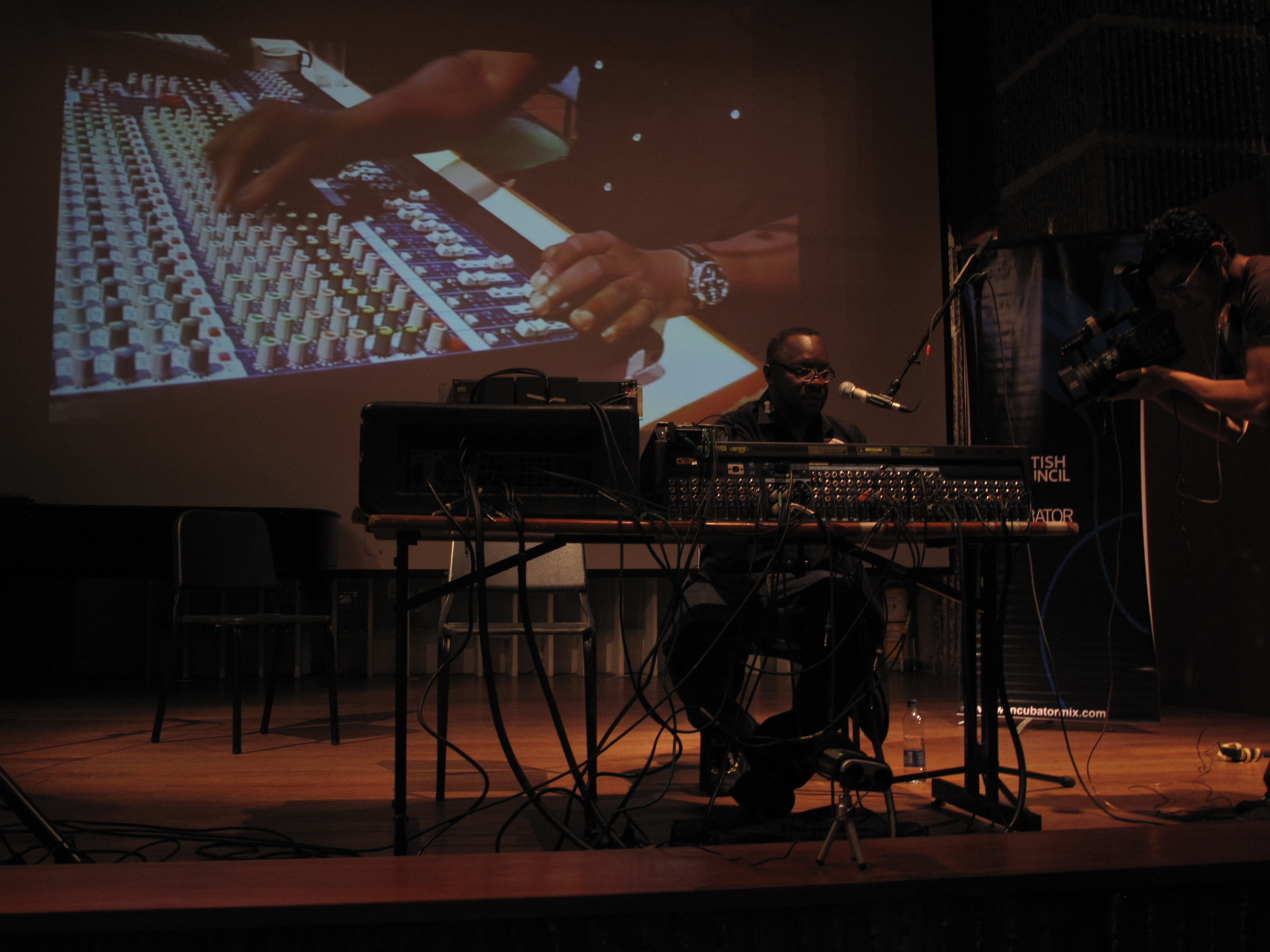
Mad Professor, 2009

- Mad Professor
- Mark Stewart
- Massive Attack
- Matisyahu
- Meat Beat Manifesto
- Mikey Dread
- Mungo's Hi Fi
- Moa Anbessa
- Moonlight Dub Experiment
- More Rockers
- Mute Beat

== N ==
- Niney the Observer
- Natty Nation

== O ==
- OKI
- Ott
- The Orb
- Ooklah The Moc

== P ==
- Pepper
- Pitch Black
- Prince Far I
- Prince Jammy
- Lee "Scratch" Perry

== R ==
- Rebelution
- Rhythm & Sound
- Johnny Ringo
- Roots Radics
- Roots Tonic
- Rhombus

== S ==
- Saafi Brothers
- The Sabres of Paradise
- Salmonella Dub
- Santigold
- Scientist
- Skream
- The Slackers
- Slightly Stoopid
- Sly & Robbie
- Smith & Mighty
- Sneaker Pimps
- Sofa Surfers
- Soldiers of Jah Army
- Spacemonkeyz
- Stand High Patrol
- Steel Pulse
- Stick Figure
- Subatomic Sound System
- Sublime

== T ==
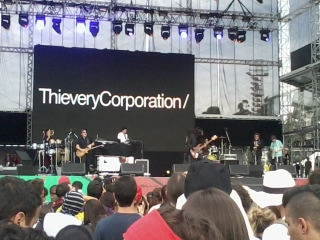
Thievery Corporation, 2012

- Tackhead
- Tapper Zukie
- Thievery Corporation
- Linval Thompson
- Ticklah
- The Toasters
- Tosca
- Trentemøller
- Tropidelic
- Twilight Circus
- Twinkle Brothers

== U ==
- The Upsetters
- UB40

== V ==
- Vibronics
- Victor Axelrod
- Victor Rice
- Vladislav Delay

== Y ==
- Yabby You

== Z ==
- Zion Train
