= The Gomers =

The Gomers are an American comedy rock, experimental music, and progressive rock band from Madison, Wisconsin. Former Madison mayors Dave Cieslewicz and Sue Baumann both proclaimed February 1 as "Gomer Day" in Madison. Their name was taken from Gomer Pyle.

== Career ==
In April 2006, Maximum Ink noted the "longevity, durability, or diversity" of the band, and the mayoral Gomer Day Proclamation.

Madison Magazine did a film feature in 2006 of karaoke in Madison, and documented the Gomers' 'Gomeroke' live karaoke show.

The group got its start playing weekly at Madison's popular but ill-fated Club De Wash, formerly located in the Hotel Washington (Madison, Wisconsin), and currently plays eight times or more monthly with its live band karaoke show, 'Gomeroke', at the High Noon Saloon.

Wisconsin Public Radio did an episode on the phenomenon of "Rockstar Gomeroke" in 2009. The band went on hiatus in 2016.

The group also spawned the parody band The Zombeatles.

== Awards ==
The Gomers have won several Madison Area Music Awards: 2006 Unique Artist, 2006 Unique Song, 2005 and 2007 Best Cover Band, 2008 Unique Album and Unique Artist. The reader poll of Madison weekly newspaper, The Isthmus has awarded them "Madison's Favorite Cover Band" and "Madison's Favorite Dance Band" from 2000 to 2009.

== Guest stars ==
The Gomers played with Les Paul at his Wisconsin Foundation for School Music Lifetime Achievement Award dinner, on October 27, 2004.

== Members ==
- Dave Adler (Willy Porter, Richard Cheese and Lounge Against the Machine, Zombeatles, Sigtryggur Baldursson)
- Biff Blumfumgagnge (Reptile Palace Orchestra, Zombeatles, Sigtryggur Baldursson)
- Geoff Brady (Madison Symphony Orchestra, Zombeatles)
- Stephen G. Burke (Zombeatles)
- Mark Hervey (Dog the Bounty Hunter, Parking Wars)
- Gordon Ranney (Zombeatles)
- Gregg Rullman (Zombeatles)
- Andy Wallman

== Discography ==
=== Singles ===
- "Joey Saturn & Bob Uranus - Like the Planet" (Adler/Blumfumgagnge, ASCAP/BMI 1992)

=== Albums ===
- Comin' Atchya (US, 1988)
- Basement Tape (US, 1991
- Sofa King Good (US, 1999)
- Live Gome Boot (US, 2001)
- Live at The Witz End (US, 2002)
- Salt & Sugar (US, 2003)
- Basement Tape CD (US, 2005)
- Mike Zirkel The Album CD (with Adrian Belew & Robert Fripp) (US, 2008)
- Meat The Zombeatles (US, 2009)
