= Slack Season =

American alternative rock band

- Origin: Gainesville, Florida
- Genres: alternative rock
- Years active: 1995–2001
- Past members: John Youngman; Bill Youngman; Dino Fernandez; Mike Hale; Ray Powell; Aaron Carr; Geoffrey May

Slack Season was an alternative rock band active in the 1990s from Gainesville, Florida.

== Formation ==
Formed by students at the University of Florida, the band played their first gig at the Gainesville venue The Covered Dish and went on to perform there frequently for a period of several years. The band toured the US and shared the stage with Blink-182, Bloodhound Gang, Less Than Jake, For Squirrels, Fastball, Marvelous 3, Harvey Danger, James Brown and others. They performed at many music venues including CBGB, Mercury Lounge, House of Blues and others. They also performed at festivals including CMJ Music Marathon, Sundance Film Festival, Warped Tour, Stop the Violence, NEMO, Atlantis Music Conference and Alachua County Music Harvest, among others. In 1999, the Gainesville music community awarded the band "Favorite Pop Band" at the annual Hogtown Music Awards and they were later profiled in Billboard magazine.

The band was formed by the brothers Youngman (vocalist/guitarist John and bassist Bill) and the lineup around them changed a few times. Geoffrey May was the band's first drummer, replaced by dino Fernandez, who was the longest-running member besides the brothers. In between regular guitarists, Derron Nuhfer (formerly of Less Than Jake) would sometimes also sit in with the group playing guitar. The band's guitarists also included Mike Hale, Ray Powell and Aaron Carr.

== Commercial success ==
In 1998, Slack Season recorded a set of demos which garnered interest from Epic Records VP of A&R Rose Noone. The band drove to New York in the middle of winter to showcase at Arlene Grocery, but no deal ensued. After a couple false starts with other labels and producers, the band flew to New York City on September 8, 2001, to showcase for MCA Records executives and producer Don Gehman at CBGB. Shortly after the September 11 attacks the group disbanded.
