= Errol Brown (sound engineer) =

Jamaican record producer

Errol Brown is a Jamaican audio engineer and record producer.

== Biography ==
Brown is the nephew of the late Duke Reid, the pioneer of Treasure Isle recording studio. Educated at Kingston Technical High School, where he did radio and television, Brown was trained as an audio engineer at Treasure Isle studios by Byron Smith and Duke Reid.

Brown recorded artists such as: Alton Ellis, Gilberto Gil, The Paragons, The Sensations, Marcia Griffiths, Judy Mowatt, Peter Tosh, U-Roy, Gregory Isaacs, Culture, Rebelution, Cultura Profética, Natty Nation and many more. Brown left Treasure Isle in 1979, where he joined Bob Marley & The Wailers at Tuff Gong Studios. He recorded and mixed albums with Bob Marley & The Wailers, Rita Marley, Burning Spear and Third World.

Brown was with Ziggy Marley and The Melody Makers from the time they started as kids. He also did live shows with Bob Marley & The Wailers, Rita Marley and with Ziggy Marley & The Melody Makers in the studios and on the road until 2000. In 2001 and 2002, he was Shaggy's live sound engineer. In 2003, he engineered Ziggy Marley's first solo tour. He also was in charge of the sound at the Roots, Rock, Reggae Festival in 2004 & 2006. As of 2014, Brown is on tour running sound for Rebelution. As of 2023, Brown is on tour with the legendary UK Roots Reggae band Steel Pulse.
