= List of Wisconsin magazines =

This is a list of magazines published in Wisconsin:

== A ==
- Astronomy

== B ==
- Birds & Blooms

== C ==
- Cabin Life
- Coins

== D ==
- Discover

== E ==
- Exclusively Yours Magazine

== G ==
- Garden Railways
- Goldmine

== H ==
- Hoard's Dairyman

== K ==
- Knucklebones

== M ==
- Madison Magazine
- Milwaukee Magazine
- MKE Lifestyle Magazine
- Model Railroader
- Music K-8

== N ==
- Nude & Natural

== O ==
- OnMilwaukee.com
- Our Wisconsin

== P ==
- Professional Distributor
- Professional Tool & Equipment News

== R ==
- Reminisce

== T ==
- Taste of Home
- The Progressive
- The Wisconsin Engineer
- The Writer
- Trains

== V ==
- Volume One

== W ==
- Wisconsin Magazine of History
- Wisconsin People and Ideas
- Wisconsin Trails (defunct)
