= Jagatara =

Japanese band

Jagatara was a Japanese band centered on Edo Akemi. They are renowned for their unique sound, which has been described as a mixture of rock, especially punk, funk and reggae.

The band formed in March, 1979, and released their first album 'Nanban Torai' 「南蛮渡来」in 1982. Their multi-musical approach resulted in collaborations with differing artists from around the world, such as Mute Beat, John Zorn, and Mahotella Queens. On January 27, 1990, Edo died, and the band broke up shortly after. Since that time there has been an annual concert held by the Shinjuku loft venue in honour of the band, featuring numerous guest musicians performing Jagatara songs.

Jagatara reunited as Jagatara2020 for the first time in 30 years and released the single "Nijiiro Fanfare" on January 29, 2020.

== Band members ==
- Edo Akemi a.k.a. Edo Masataka —Vocals
  - Edo died in an accident while taking a bath on January 27, 1990.
- Ebby —Guitar
- Nabe (Watanabe Masami) —Bass
- Oto —Guitar
- Shino-chan (Shinoda Masami)—Saxophone
- Teiyū (Nakamura Teiyū)—Drums
- Yoshida Tetsuji —Trumpet
- Yahiro Tomohiro —Percussion
- Murata-kun (Murata Yōichi)—Trombone
- Emerson Kitamura (Kitamura Kenzi)—Keyboards
- Minami Sasuga —Chorus&Dance
- Yukarie —Chorus & Dance, Saxophone

== Discography ==
=== Singles ===
- 'Last Tango in Juku' EP/Record ('Ankokutairiku Jagatara', 1982/5)
- 'Kazoku Hyaku Kei/Pussy Doctor/Nippon Kabushikigaisha' EP/CD (1985/3)
- 'Uki Uki' Live 12" (1987/4)
- 'Ja Bom Be' Live 12" (1988/3)
- 'Tango' CD (1989/4)
- 'Ja・Bom・Be' Ja・Bom・Be+Uki Uki [Reissue] (1990/3)

=== Album ===
- 'Nanban Torai' LP ('Ankokutairiku Jagatara', 1982/5)
- 'Kun to odoriakaso u hinode o miru made' LIVE LP (1985/10)
- 'Hadaka no Ousama' LP (1987/3)
- 'Robinson's Garden' [Movie Soundtrack] LP (1987/10)
- 'Nise Yogensha Domo' LP (1987/12)
- 'Sore Kara' CD (1989/4)
- 'Gokutsubushi' CD (1989/12)
- 'Sora Sore' CD (1990/5)
- 'Oasobi' CD (1990/6)
- 'Jagatara Naki Jagatara' Live CD (1993/2/7)

=== Compilation ===
- 'Seireki 2000nen Bunno Hansei' CD (1993/2/24)
- 'Golden Best' CD (2004/12/22)

=== Video ===
- Tengoku Chuusha no Hiru - VHS
- Mi・N・Na - VHS
- Rei no Yatsu - VHS
- Hey Google - VHS
- Nan Nokocchai I - VHS/DVD
- Nan Nokocchai II - VHS/DVD
- Nan Nokocchai III - VHS/DVD
- Baby! Gokigen ni Yatterukai
- Kono!! (Mou Gamandekina) - DVD
