= Al Jewer =

American flautist

- Born: Detroit, Michigan, U.S.
- Occupations: Musician; record producer; audio engineer
- Years active: 1980s–present
- Musical career
- Instruments: Flute; Native American flute
- Label: Laughing Cat Records

Al Jewer is an American flautist from Detroit, Michigan. He has worked as a record producer, audio engineer, and studio musician, but has become well known internationally for his work on the Native American flute. His early musical training was with the concert flute, and he has been performing classical music with that instrument since the early 1980s. In 1984, he established Laughing Cat Studio, and in 1994, Laughing Cat Records, to give himself control over the recording, production, and distribution of his music. This has given him the chance to work with many other musicians of the Midwestern U.S., including Blackhawk, David Storei and Roxanne Neat, Natty Nation, Adrian Belew, and Weekend Wages. Laughing Cat Records currently features artists who perform in the genres ambient, Native American, reggae, classical, and folk. Jewer has released two solo albums, River Crossing and Prairie Plain Song, as well as Two Trees and Music of the Earth (with Andy Mitran). He also previously formed a duo with Christine Ibach called Cedar Wind. Cedar Wind released two albums: Feather on the Wind and Kindred Spirits. His recent music often features harmonies on the alto and bass flute with melodies on the Native American flute.

In 2000, he began working with co-composer Andy Mitran (best known as Professor Andy on The Bozo Super Sunday Show) to create music for television and film. Their music has been featured on The Oprah Winfrey Show, The Dr. Oz Show, Nightline, and many other nationally-syndicated shows and public TV series. In 2008, they collaborated with photographer Arthur Durkee to create the series of video DVD meditations Liquid Crystal Gallery. In 2011, they launched the website Perfect Choice, featuring original music for commercial video production, with searchable and downloadable music for TV, film, internet, and corporate videos.

Jewer's other talents include audio engineering, music production, writing scores and charts, and audio mixing and mastering. He plays various instruments including the western concert flute, Native American flute, electronic woodwind, piano, synthesizer, and bass guitar.
