= The Zombeatles =

The Zombeatles are a zombie parody version of the rock group The Beatles. Stemming from Madison, Wisconsin band The Gomers, the group's 2006 video Hard Day's Night Of The Living Dead gained international status when horror film director and musician Rob Zombie chose it as one of his top YouTube Halloween video picks of 2007, resulting in over a million views worldwide.

In 2009 they released an album called Meat the Zombeatles and a mockumentary called The Zombeatles: All You Need Is Brains and appearing with John Wesley Harding and Eugene Mirman in their Cabinet Of Wonders Variety Show in April.

Revealed in the Behind the Music-like mockumentary are historical references to a past zombie apocalypse; however, in the Zombeatles version a complete and parallel zombie universe is proposed via The Fab Gore, the Dead Sullivan Show, The Rolling Kidney Stones, The ZomMonkees, the Dead Clark Five, The ZomZombies, Boo Marley, Elvis Grisly, Dead Zeppelin, the Beach Boils, and appearances by Ewwyoko Ohno, the ZomRutles, Fester Fangs, Bob Killin, etc.

== The band ==
The Zombeatles members are:

- Jaw Nlennon (styled after John Lennon) — played by Stephen Burke
- Pall Ickartney (styled after Paul McCartney) — played by Gordon Ranney
- Gorge Harryson (styled after George Harrison) — played by Bucky Pope, and occasionally, for some US east coast gigs, played by Jon Dichter.
- Dingo Scarr (styled after Ringo Starr) — played by Biff Blumfumgagnge
- Killy Essen (styled after Billy Preston) – played by Dave Adler
- Eat Breast (styled after Pete Best) – played by Geoff Brady

== Management ==
- Gorge Mortem (styled after George Martin) – played by Joe Soko
- Brain Epspleen (styled after Brian Epstein)

== Other appearances in the film ==
- Angus MacAbre – a Scottish zombie comedian played by writer/director Doug Gordon
- Fester Fangs (styled after Lester Bangs) – played by Ben Wydeven
- Bob Killin' – (styled after Bob Dylan) – played by Ben Wydeven
- The Devil — played by Biff Blumfumgagnge

== Discography ==
- Meat The Zombeatles, 2009 Beeftone Records
- All You Need Is Brains DVD, 2009 MacAbre Pictures

=== The Zombeatles Meat The Zombeatles ===
"The Zombeatles 'Meat The Zombeatles'" first printing (2009) Beeftone Records (U.S.)

1. "Halp!” (styled after “Help!”)
2. "Ate Brains A Week” (styled after “Eight Days a Week”)
3. "Brain” (styled after “Rain”)
4. "I Wanna Eat Your Hand” (styled after “I Want to Hold Your Hand”)
5. "She Dead” (styled after “She Said She Said”)
6. "I'm Eating Through You” (styled after “I'm Looking Through You”)
7. "Dead Prudence” (styled after “Dear Prudence”)
8. "Hey Food” (styled after “Hey Jude”)

== See also ==
- List of zombie short films and other zombie-related projects
