= The Drastics =

The Drastics are a roots-oriented dub reggae group hailing from Chicago. Though primarily classified as a reggae group, The Drastics embrace many styles of music both live and in the studio. This can be heard in their songs which draw from roots reggae, hip hop, jazz (mostly hard-bop), afro-beat, dancehall, as well as folk musics from Asia, Africa, the Middle East and South America.

== Band history ==
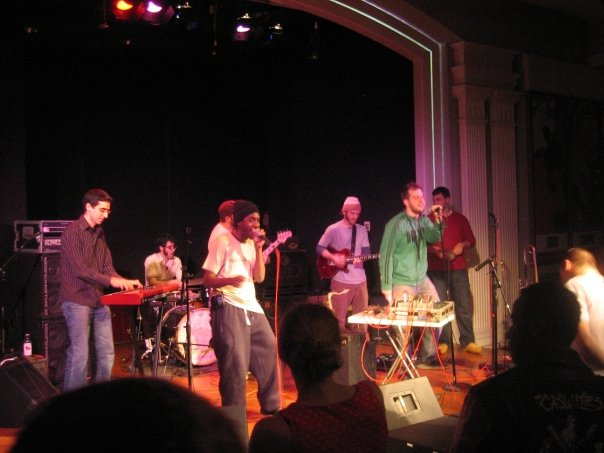
Performing in Urbana, Illinois

The Drastics formed in December 2003, playing their first show in March 2004 at Chicago's now defunct Fireside Bowl. Answering a Chicago Reader ad placed by guitarist Josh Rosenstock, the original 6 piece lineup formed and began playing originals and a handful of covers. Over the years, the group has changed from the original lineup.

The Drastics first full-length album, Premonition was released on Chicago's JumpUp! Records. The album featured guest vocalists Craig Akira Fujita (Pressure Cooker, Joint Chiefs, 10 ft Ganja Plant), King Django (Stubborn All-Stars), Dr. Ring Ding (Senior All-Stars) as well as several local underground talents.

Their second release, Chicago Massive, is a 2 disc album with 27 tracks and 24 guest musicians. It received a four-star rating from AllMusic. Disc one is a strictly instrumental set while disc two features 12 different vocalists over 12 tracks. Guest vocalists include King Django, Dr. Ring Ding, Fada Dougou, MC Zulu, Dayna Lynn, Todd Hembrook (Deal's Gone Bad), and Corey Dixon (formerly of The Zvooks). Guest musicians on the first disc include reeds player Charles Gorzynski (Salamander, Video Gum Culture), beat makers Heavy Rotation, and trumpeter Rich Graiko (Westbound Train). The record went into production almost immediately following the release of Premonition and was completed over the course of the next 14 months.

Though primarily (and originally strictly) instrumental, The Drastics have begun to perform more frequently with vocalists. Currently, West African vocalist Fada Dougou can be seen regularly bringing his unique style of chant/singing to The Drastic's live shows. Panamanian-born, Chicago-based vocalist Zulu is also a regular performer with the Drastics.

== Members ==
- Tom Riley - Tenor Sax, Flute, Live Dub
- Andrew Zelm - Trombone, Melodica
- Elliot Ross - Guitar
- Brian Citro - Guitar
- Bijan Warner - Keys
- Chris Merrill - Bass
- General Jah Son - Binghi
- Anthony Abbinanti - Drums & Album Engineering/Production
- MC Zulu - Vocals
- Fada Dougou - Vocals
