= Bradley Fish =

American musician (born 1970)

Bradley Fish בראדלי פיש
- Born: 1970 (age 55–56); Bethesda, Maryland, U.S.
- Origin: United States; Israel
- Genres: Rock; reggae; metal; blues; electronica; modern folk
- Occupations: Musician; session musician; producer; songwriter
- Instruments: Guitar; Appalachian dulcimer; banjo; German concert zither; guzheng
- Labels: Sony Pictures Digital; Peace Love Productions; Apple iLife
- Website: bradleyfish.com
- Education: B.A. in Guitar from Northern Illinois University

Bradley Fish (Hebrew: בראדלי פיש; born Bethesda, Maryland, 1970) is an American born musician based in Israel.

== Early life ==
Fish was born in Bethesda, Maryland, and moved to the Midwest with his family at the age of 3. He is of German and Litvak descent.

He last resided in Madison, Wisconsin, before making Aliyah to Israel in 2004.

He holds a B.A. in guitar from Northern Illinois University, where he studied with jazz guitarist Fareed Haque.

== Career ==
Fish's musical loops are performed on the Appalachian dulcimer, banjo, German concert zither, and guzheng (Chinese zither). The loops are created by recording the actual playing of the instrument and then slicing riffs with music editing software, and used by modern composers as an enhancement or as a basis for their own music. Hos loops have been released with Sony Pictures Digital, Peace Love Productions, and Apple iLife.

Fish combined many of these exotic and folk instruments with electronics in modern musical contexts (rock, reggae, metal, fusion, blues, electronica, modern folk, etc.), recording The Aquarium Conspiracy CD with Sugarcubes/Björk drummer Sigtryggur Baldursson and multi-instrumentalist Biff Blumfumgagnge in 1996. Fish is now performing and creating video footage of his jam band style one-man live looping.

Fish recorded via the Internet for a Bigga Haitian record with George Clinton/Funkadelic/Snoop Doggy Dogg drummer Jerome Bailey, Bob Marley's replacement in The Wailers, Yvad, and Jerry Johnson. Fish has pioneered the use of the Internet as a medium for recording tracks of guitars and exotic instruments as well as musical instruction. The Jerusalem Post referred to him as a "master guitar teacher."

Fish shocked his "hippie" and left-leaning fan base, playing live twice on Fox News with then-Governor of Arkansas Mike Huckabee and including singer Pat Boone. Boone complemented Fish's "growling" vocals and lyrical improv ability in the Jerusalem Post.

Fish has toured internationally, performing for many notable people, including the Dalai Lama. He has recorded tracks with artists in Israel including Rami Kleinstein, Arkadi Duchin and Yehuda Poliker. Fish's live shows in Israel have included Jon Shapiro of Ofra Haza's final live band.

Fish's videos of edgy music comedy and unorthodox techniques on ethnic instruments have sparked controversy in internet forums.

Fish is working as a session musician, producer and/or co-writer for a number of artists, including Fox News reporter Mike Tobin, singer Michelle Cohn, and Dan Reed of the Dan Reed Network. He has also done soundtracks for videos for the Orthodox Union and Chabad of Australia. He reports on his website that he will be touring in support of a new CD soon.
