= Doctah X =

American DJ, singer and musician

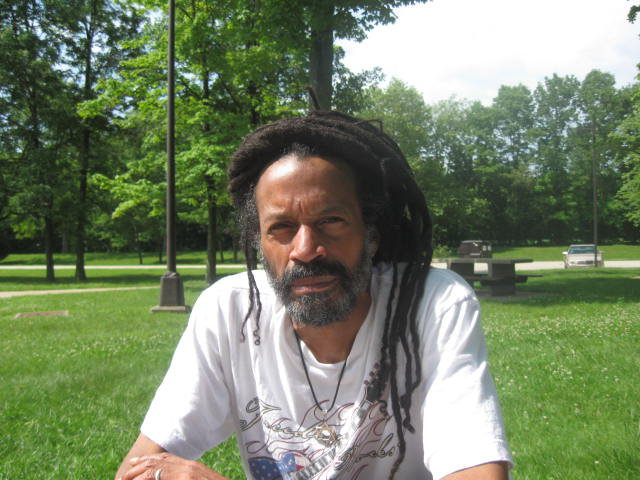
Doctah X in 2009

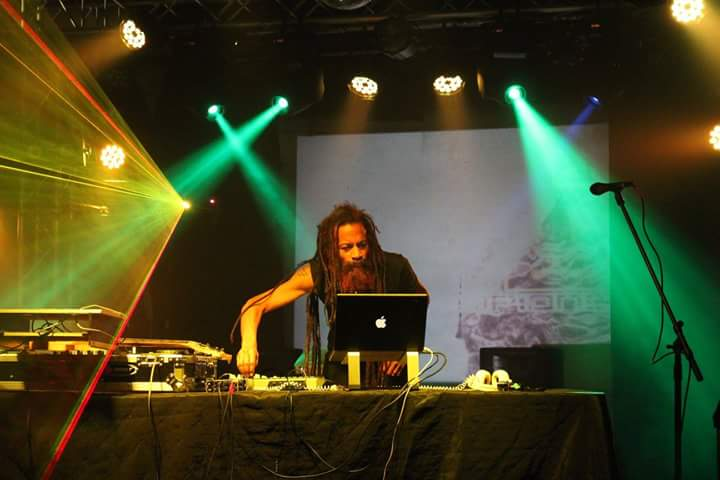
Doctah X - Columbus, Ohio 2015

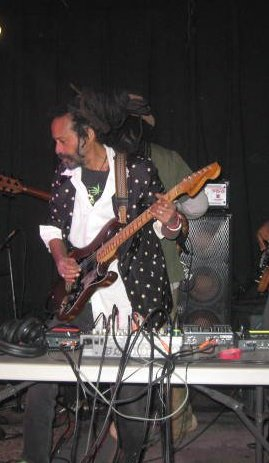

Tony Harrington (born August 17, 1948, in Lexington, Kentucky), grew up in Bracktown, Lexington, Kentucky. He was often better known to his friends as Doctah X, was a DJ, singer, and musician who operated the House of Dub Studio in Columbus, Ohio, and hosted a radio program on WCRS Columbus. He died of natural causes on December 24, 2020, at his home in Columbus, Ohio.

== Career ==
Doctah X's music was firmly rooted in Jamaican Reggae, and he ventured deeply into the realm of Reggae known as Dub music and Dubstep. His music encompassed Eastern and African sounds. He performed at clubs and festivals throughout the Midwest (Dayton Reggae Fest, Psych Fest in Columbus, and annually performed at the Hot Times Festival and the Community Festival in Columbus, Ohio). He also performed at clubs and events in his native Kentucky, and in New York City at Roberta's, Tonic and The Knitting Factory. In the 1970s and 80s, as a blues guitarist, he recorded and toured in Europe with Cream drummer Ginger Baker and played with blues legends John Lee Hooker and Albert Collins, Lele Gaudi and recorded more with Umar Bin Hassan on Stay Focused Records. He has performed with his group Scarob alongside Lee "Scratch" Perry, Dr. Israel, and Subatomic Sound System at the Brooklyn Bowl in New York as well as at Bourbon Beach in Negril, Jamaica.

In 1997, in sharp contrast to his musical image, he applied for a job with the Main Library in Columbus. Of this he says:

I came here to get some DVDs, and I saw a guy with long red hair and a nose piercing. I thought, 'If they hired him, maybe I can get a job here.'

He continued to do library programs for children and teens even after he formally retired, and twelve of his albums are now listed in the library's catalog.

Previous releases are Shadowthief and Doctah X "Agent from Kabul". He works with the Fuse Factory Electronic and Digital Arts Lab, an art and technology not-for-profit initiative based in Columbus, Ohio in conjunction with The Greater Columbus Arts Council. Label: Boom One Records, Subatomic Sound.

== Recordings ==
- Another Day in Babylon (2002)
- Doctah X vs. Dr Israel – Baboon Records (2002)
- Umar Bin Hassan - Stay Focused Records (2002)
- Prescriptions - Big Spliff Outernational (2004)
- Roots of Dub Funk 4: Rise of the Electric Dread (2004)
- Doctah X “Agent from Kabul” Big Spliff Outernational 007 (2007)
- Skarob - Faktionink Records; Suitable # 2 Suite Inc. (Italy) (2009)
- Ecosystem, vol. 2 -Societa’ Nazionale de Salvamento (Italy) (2009)
- Homeland Security – Big Spliff Outernational; Mantra - Big Spliff Outernational (2006)
- Bangkok Chili (2013)
- Dub as One (2014)
- Shadowthief (2015)
- Code for Survival- Dougie Simpson (2015)
- Agent from Kabul (2015)
- Cod for Survival - Dougie Simpson (2015)
- Sarno Project (2016)
- Selah Sound (2019)
- A Souljah's Chants - The Genuine Heartical Vol. 2 - Dougie Simpson (2019)
- Python Diaries (2019)
