= Biff Blumfumgagnge =

American drummer

Biff Moyer (born David Lee Morelock, January 17, 1964), who became known under the name Biff Uranus Blumfumgagnge, is an American musician, guitar technician, sound engineer, record producer and instructor of music and recording technology at the Madison Media Institute.

== Early life ==
Born in Milwaukee, he was adopted and grew up in Madison, Wisconsin. He took on his legal name (pronounced Blumm-fumm-gog-in-ya) in 1992.

== Toured and recorded with ==
Pat MacDonald, Willy Porter (February 1990–present), King Crimson (August 2008), Sigtryggur Baldursson (drummer of the Sugarcubes, 1993–1997), Eugene Chadbourne, Reptile Palace Orchestra, The Gomers, Natty Nation, Bradley Fish, The Kissers, Wisconsin Youth Symphony Orchestra, and Zombeatles.

== Performed with ==
Les Paul, & Steve Miller (November 2005), Adrian Belew (March 1992–present), Eugene Chadbourne (February 2004–present), Lee "Scratch" Perry (August 25, 2008), Reptile Palace Orchestra (April 1994–present), The Gomers (December 1986–present), Natty Nation (February 1993–present), Jambeau (May 2001–present), Bradley Fish (January 1996-September 1997), John Kruth (April 2003-November 2005), Joan Wildman (February 1991), Clyde Stubblefield (James Brown's "funky drummer", March 1991-April 2007), Killbilly (April 1994), The Appliances-SFB (December 1997), Jimmy Carl Black (October 2007), Stuart Stotts (September 2002-August 2007) and Project/Object with Napoleon Murphy Brock (October 23, 2007), and Yid Vicious (2005–Present).

== Discography ==
- Adrian Belew – Side Four live
- Pat MacDonald PM does DM – Strange Love
- Willy Porter: Dog Eared Dream (1992), High Wire Live (2002), Falling Forward
- Eugene Chadbourne "Doc Chad Banjo Book"
- Sigtryggur Baldursson: Bogomil Font Sings Kurt Weill (1994)
- Bradley Fish: The Aquarium Conspiracy (1996)
- Headpump: Org@sm.com (1997),
- David Stocker, Moondog (1997)
- Marques Bovre & The Evil Twins – Lonesome County (1999) & the Evil Twins Music
- Genevieve Gereb "Cool Bananas," "Alligator," and "Jumpin' Jelly Beans"
- The Gomers (1986–present)
- Jim James & The Damn Shames (2002)
- My Nightclub Act "Highway Gothic" (2008, violin)
- John Kruth: Live at Witz End (2003)
- The Gomers: Comin' Atchya, Sofa King Good, Salt and Sugar
- Mike Zirkel (1989 – present),
- Reptile Palace Orchestra: Early Reptile, On the Wings of a Skink, XOPO!, Iguana iguana, HWY X, We Know You Know, Official Bootleg
- Sara Pace: "Sara Pace"
- Dorothy Heralds: "Inverno Rosa"
- Ivan Klipstein "Scorpio Enviro"
- Michael Gruber "Yesterday Is Make Believe"
- Dangerous Odds (1996–2003)
- Arthur Durkee "The Western Lands,"
- My Nightclub Act (2008)
- Ritt Dietz "Collected" and "After the Mountains"
- Cattle Prod: Boost (1993, guitar, vocals)
- Poopshovel: We Came, We Saw, We Had A Hot Dog (1994, vocals)
- Dafino (2006, violin)
- Cathy Braaten "Ride the Fader" (1991)
- Jim James & The Damn Shames (2003)
- Fuzzy Logic (1997–present)
- Tom Hanson (2004, 2007, violin, mandolin, Melobar, synth)
- Doctor Demento Shows #89-35, #90-12, #02-16, #02-10
- Zombeatles, "Hard Day's Night Of The Living Dead"
- Art Paul Schlosser
- Die Warzau "Convenience" (2004), Deep "Mobile" (1997), Everplastic "Aquagirl" (1998)

== MAMA (Madison Area Music) Awards ==
Awarded Best Instrumentalist in 2005

MAMA Award
Year	Category	Title	Result
2005	Instrumentalist – strings	Best Instrumentalist	Winner

== WAMI (Wisconsin Area Music Industry) Awards ==
Awarded Best Instrumentalist in 1998

WAMI Award
Year	Category	Title	Result
1998	Instrumentalist – strings	Best Instrumentalist	Winner
