= Volume One (magazine) =

Entertainment magazine

- Volume One magazine cover 2015
- Editor: McKenna Scherer
- Frequency: Biweekly
- Publisher: Nick Meyer
- Founder: Nick Meyer; Dale Karls
- Founded: 2002
- Company: Volume One Magazine
- Country: United States
- Based in: Eau Claire, Wisconsin
- Language: English
- Website: https://volumeone.org

Volume One is a biweekly culture and entertainment magazine based in Eau Claire, Wisconsin. Founded in 2002, the publication serves the Chippewa Valley region, including Eau Claire, Menomonie, and Chippewa Falls, and focuses on local arts, music, food, and community events.

The magazine prints approximately 14,000 copies every two weeks and distributes them free of charge at hundreds of locations throughout the region . In addition to its print edition, Volume One operates an online platform featuring editorial content, an events calendar, and ticketing services.

== History ==
Volume One was founded in 2002 in Eau Claire, Wisconsin, by Nick Meyer and Dale Karls. The publication began as a small, black-and-white arts and culture magazine and later transitioned to a biweekly, full-color publication serving the Chippewa Valley region.

In the early 2000s, Volume One expanded its presence online with the launch of VolumeOne.org, which developed into a digital platform featuring editorial content and a regional events calendar. Over time, the organization expanded beyond print publishing to include event production, video production, and retail operations, including The Local Store.

Volume One marked its 20th anniversary in 2022 and has published hundreds of issues since its founding.

== See also ==
- List of Wisconsin magazines
