= Mute Beat =

Japanese band

Mute Beat was an influential dub reggae band from Japan.

They are often considered a precursor to acid jazz, ambient and trip hop having performed similar-sounding music before those genres emerged. The band was formed by Kazufumi Kodama, who grew up enjoying marching band music and later discovered reggae in the late 70s. In 1981 he formed Mute Beat with the aim to make dub music that would go boldly into unexplored music territories, including the use of marching band techniques. The original keyboardist Gota Yashiki left the band in the mid 80s and moved overseas to produce music for Soul II Soul and Sinéad O'Connor amongst others. Mute Beat's first release was a self-titled cassette on New York's Roir label. They collaborated with many musicians including Jagatara, Gladstone Anderson, Roland Alphonso, King Tubby, and Lee Scratch Perry.

== Members ==
- Kazufumi "Echo" Kodama - trumpet
- Akihito Masui - trombone
- Hiroyuki Asamoto - keyboards
- Gota Yashiki - keyboards (previously)
- Takayoshi Matsunaga - bass
- Hideyuki Imai - drums
- Izumi "Dub Master X" Miyazaki - dub mix

== Discography ==
=== Albums ===
- Japanese Dub (Cass) (1986)
- In Dub (Cass) (1986)
- Still Echo (LP) (1986) (Wackies)
- Lovers Rock (Cass) (1988)
- Live (CD) (1989)
- In Dub (CD) (1996)
- No. 0 Virgin Dub (LP) (1996)

=== Singles ===
- (1984) Mute Beat
- (1988) Sunny Side Walk
