= The Wisconsin Engineer =

American university student magazine

- The cover of the Summer 2017 edition of The Wisconsin Engineer
- Editor: Matt Henricks; Steven Musbach
- Frequency: Seasonal (4 per year)
- Publisher: Wisconsin Engineering Journal Association
- First issue: June, 1896
- Based in: Madison, Wisconsin, U.S.
- Website: wisconsinengineer.com
- ISSN: 0043-6453
- OCLC: 2451631

The Wisconsin Engineer is a student-run magazine and registered non-profit 401(C)3 corporation. The staff, all volunteers, are students at the University of Wisconsin-Madison. The magazine covers topics in modern science and engineering, with a particular focus on University of Wisconsin–Madison faculty research and student achievements. Most articles are written to be mainly informative, yet the magazine occasionally publishes opinion articles and satire articles related to engineering topics or controversies centered around the University of Wisconsin-Madison. The Wisconsin Engineer is published four times a year seasonally and distributed in print across the University of Wisconsin-Madison campus. The magazine offers paid subscriptions and, more recently, posts the full content of articles on their website. The Magazine has remained relatively local in its coverage, allowing it to foster relationships with professional organizations such as the Wisconsin Society of Professional Engineers.

While the magazine is operated by students, a faculty adviser from the College of Engineering typically gives recommendations to the leadership. Steven Zwickel, a professor at the University of Wisconsin-Madison's Engineering Professional Development department, is the current adviser to the magazine. He has been with the magazine for over 15 years and is considered the "collective memory" of the magazine. As of 2017, The Wisconsin Engineer is a member of the Wisconsin Undergraduate Journal Association.

== History ==
This is the cover from the third printed magazine from January 1897.

The first volume of the Wisconsin Engineer was published in June 1896, with the editors calling the magazine a "trial trip in the field of technical journalism." The magazine contained articles by both students and faculty with a focus on engineering topics. The magazine ran over 160 pages long, containing a large index and multiple advertisements. The magazine was published five more times before it settled into a continuous seasonal publication schedule in 1902 (with short periods of monthly publication).

In March 1923 The Wisconsin Engineer was first shown represented at a meeting of Engineering College Magazines Associated (ECMA), a group made up of the engineering magazines of several universities across the United States. In addition to providing a venue for discussion on technical writing, ECMA allowed for standardized advertising across the magazines. This was a large source of revenue for The Wisconsin Engineer until the eventual decline of ECMA's financial influence in the 1980s century. In the early 21st century ECMA faded into obscurity as fewer magazines were interested in membership and conferences stopped being held.

In 1972, Howard Schwebke incorporated the Wisconsin Engineer Journal Association as a non-profit corporation to take advantage of tax benefits and to reduce the magazine's reliance on and responsibility to the University of Wisconsin-Madison. Despite this independence, the magazine has been reliant on funding from the university in a few cases. In 1989 the Engineering Professional Development department sponsored an issue for $900, and in 1991 and 1992 the College of Engineering contributed $4000 and $7000, respectively. In 1995, facing $12,000 of debt, the magazine was offered relief from the university with the condition that print publications cease. Steven Zwickel, the faculty adviser of the magazine, helped a team of students create a business plan and make the magazine solvent again. Jon Furniss, editor-in-chief from 1996 to 1998, was one of the members of the new leadership and was pivotal in restarting The Wisconsin Engineer in its current form. In addition to working on the solvency plan, Furniss advocated to grant college credit to magazine members and recruit younger students.

In the 2010s The Wisconsin Engineer made pushes to revamp their website, in an attempt to adapt to the changing world of news publishing. The Wisconsin Engineer currently publishes four editions a year in print and online.

== Organizational structure ==
Unlike other student organizations on the University of Wisconsin-Madison campus, The Wisconsin Engineer is responsible for its finances and organization as a non-profit corporation.

The editor-in-chief, of which there are often two, serves as the highest position within the organization. The editor-in-chief is responsible for the publication, distribution, and financial solvency of the magazine. They also oversee the departments and conduct meetings.

The writing department is in charge of writing the magazine's articles. A staffer will typically conduct at least one interview for an article, except for satire and opinion articles. An article will undergo three rounds of editing, focusing on content and article structure. The writing department heads, also acting as the editors, brainstorm story ideas and guide the article process for staffers.

The business department manages the finances of the magazine and secures funding. Much of a staffer's job involves securing advertisements in the magazine, while the department heads oversee the staffers and advise the editor-in-chief.

The photography department is in charge of taking photos and videos for the magazine. Photographers typically work with their partners in writing, often attending interviews.

The graphic design department handles page layout for the printed edition of the magazine.

In addition to these main roles, there is a managing editor and a copy editor. The managing editor, typically a former editor-in-chief, offers advice to leadership, while the copy editor, separate from the writing department, makes final fixes before an article is sent to publish.
