= Professional Distributor Magazine =

Automotive aftermarket magazine

Professional Distributor
- Editor: Sara Scullin
- Categories: Automotive Magazine
- Frequency: 10 Issues per year
- Circulation: 15,000
- Company: Endeavor Business Media
- Country: United States
- Based in: Fort Atkinson, Wisconsin
- Language: English
- Website: Official Website
- ISSN: 1553-6211

Professional Distributor magazine is an automotive aftermarket magazine for mobile tool and equipment jobbers and tool and equipment warehouse distributors.

The magazine has a circulation of approximately 15,000 automotive repair professionals.

== Overview ==
Professional Distributor is based in Fort Atkinson, Wisconsin. The magazine covers new tools and equipment in auto repair, sales tips for jobbers, IT help and more. It is issued 10 times per year.

The magazine was part of Cygnus Business Media.

== Ownership ==
The company sold the magazine and others to SouthComm, Inc., a publishing and communications company, based in Nashville, Tennessee in November 2014. In 2018, Southcomm sold its trade publications to Endeavor Business Media.

== See also ==
- The Truth About Cars
