= Boom One Records =

Music record label

- Founded: 2007
- Founder: Peter Brown, Justin Butler
- Genre: Reggae, dub, dubtronica, cumbia, ragga jungle
- Country of origin: United States
- Location: North Carolina

Boom One Records is an independent record label that specializes in reggae, dub, dubtronica, cumbia, and ragga jungle. Based in North Carolina, Boom One Records was founded in 2007 by Peter Brown and Justin Butler. In addition to music publishing, Boom One Records is also involved in artist tour and concert promotion.

Several releases on Boom One Records have received awards and critical acclaim from music critics. Hope Massive's "itany" was listed number 2 of the top 20 reggae albums released in 2008 by WNCW. Damo Naimad's Nu Cumbia release "Ritmo De Porro" received critical acclaim being included on the Generation Bass "The Year's Round Up" as one of the best Nu Cumbia albums of 2012. In 2013 Boom One Sound System's "Stop" featuring B. Davis was listed 8th on Juno Download's "Best Dub of 2013" list. Also in 2013 "Optimist by Choice" by Semtam ft. Mannex was nominated for an Anděl Award in the Ska and Reggae category.

== Awards and honors ==
2013 - "Optimist by Choice" by Semtam ft. Mannex was nominated for an Anděl Award in the Ska and Reggae category. 2013 - Boom One Record won the "Label to Watch in 2014" from Symphonic Distribution 2013 - Boom One Sound System's "Stop" featuring B. Davis was listed 8th on Juno Download's "Best Dub of 2013" list. 2008 - Hope Massive's "itany" was listed number 2 of the top 20 reggae albums released in 2008 by WNCW.
