= Reptile Palace Orchestra =

The Reptile Palace Orchestra is an eclectic worldbeat band based in Madison, Wisconsin which specializes in lounge, klezmer and other Eastern European music. It began in 1994 with a gig at the Club de Wash, and since that time has become a notable fixture in the Madison music scene. Membership has varied, but the current line-up consists of Maggie Weiser, Biff Blumfumgagnge, Seth Blair, Kia Karlen, Bill Feeny, Robert Schoville, Greg Smith and Ed Feeny, and included Sigtryggur Baldursson of Sugarcubes/Björk fame on their first 2 Omnium releases, Iguana iguana and HWY X

Worldwide sources include their Greenman Review, their Ink 19 interview by Holly Day, their Dirty Linen appearance, their Inside World Music interview by Paula E. Kirman, a 2003 cover story in Maximum Ink and an appearance in Snapshotmusic's FolkLib Index listing. They also appeared on Balkans Without Borders which benefitted the non-profit Doctors Without Borders organization.

Among the traditional Folk dance material, the group has a song dedicated to the Freshwater Drum. Boiled in Lead members Drew Miller and Robin Adnan Anders have both played with the Reptiles, and Biff has played with Boiled in Lead. The Reptiles also share membership (Kia, Greg and Geoff Brady) with Yid Vicious a notable Madison Klezmer band.

== Discography ==
- Early Reptile, 1994, Boat Records
- On The Wings Of A Skink, 1995, Motile Music
- Hwy X., 1997, Omnium Records
- Live Field Recording, 1998, Beeftone Music
- Iguana Iguana, 1999, Omnium Records
- XOPO ! ,2000, Beeftone Music
- Official Bootleg, 2002, Beeftone Music
- We Know You Know, 2004, Omnium Records
- Songs and Dances of Madisonia, 2012, Omnium Records
