= Moonlight Dub Xperiment =

Costa Rican dub band

- Origin: Costa Rica
- Genres: dub, world
- Years active: 2006–present
- Labels: Independent
- Members: Gabo; Huba; Solar; Ronny Flores; DJ Tommy
- Website: moonlightdub.com

Moonlight Dub Xperiment is a live dub band formed 2009 in San Jose, Costa Rica. Their music is in the Ethnic dub/world music genre which is similar to Kanka, Thievery Corporation, Lee Scratch Perry.

== Bio ==
Official Moonlight Dub Xperiment logo

Moonlight Dub Xperiment create dub music, which although based originally on reggae, they usually mix with newer urban styles such as hip-hop, electronic music, and psychedelic rock/dub amongst others. The lyrics hold a strong militant message and will center around connection, positive evolution, ecology and in general a better and more aware self.

Since it was brought to life, the band has been part of artistic festivals and the underground music scene with an increasing following. The band's debut album, Biodub, (Independent) appeared in 2009. The original album came with a seed attached to the case and the slogan: “In every seed a forest lies within.”, which was in line with the ecological message that the band wanted to exalt in this first production. This was also the official appearance of Huba, a local MC, as a militant part of the band. The album has song remixes done by Mad Professor (UK), one of Lee "Scratch" Perry’s students. Promotion of this album took MDX to El Salvador, Guatemala and Mexico, as well as opening shows for some of the most reputable artists within the reggae scene.

Through the years the band also included more resources and integrated some of the best local artists to the collective, including elements like African percussion, didgeridoo, hip hop vocals, dj samples and live dub effects.

In 2014 they present their second album, Day & Night (independent), which holds a double album. The Day album contains the original live performed dub versions of the tracks, whilst the Night album portrays versions of the original tracks by the band or remixed versions by different artists. The album was nominated in Costa Rican ACAM awards in the best reggae album category.

== Discography - Albums ==
- Biodub (2009)
- Day & Night (2014)
- Noon (2016)
- Pensamiento (2019)
- Gracias (2019)
- Cree-Siente (2019)
