= Stand High Patrol =

French sound system

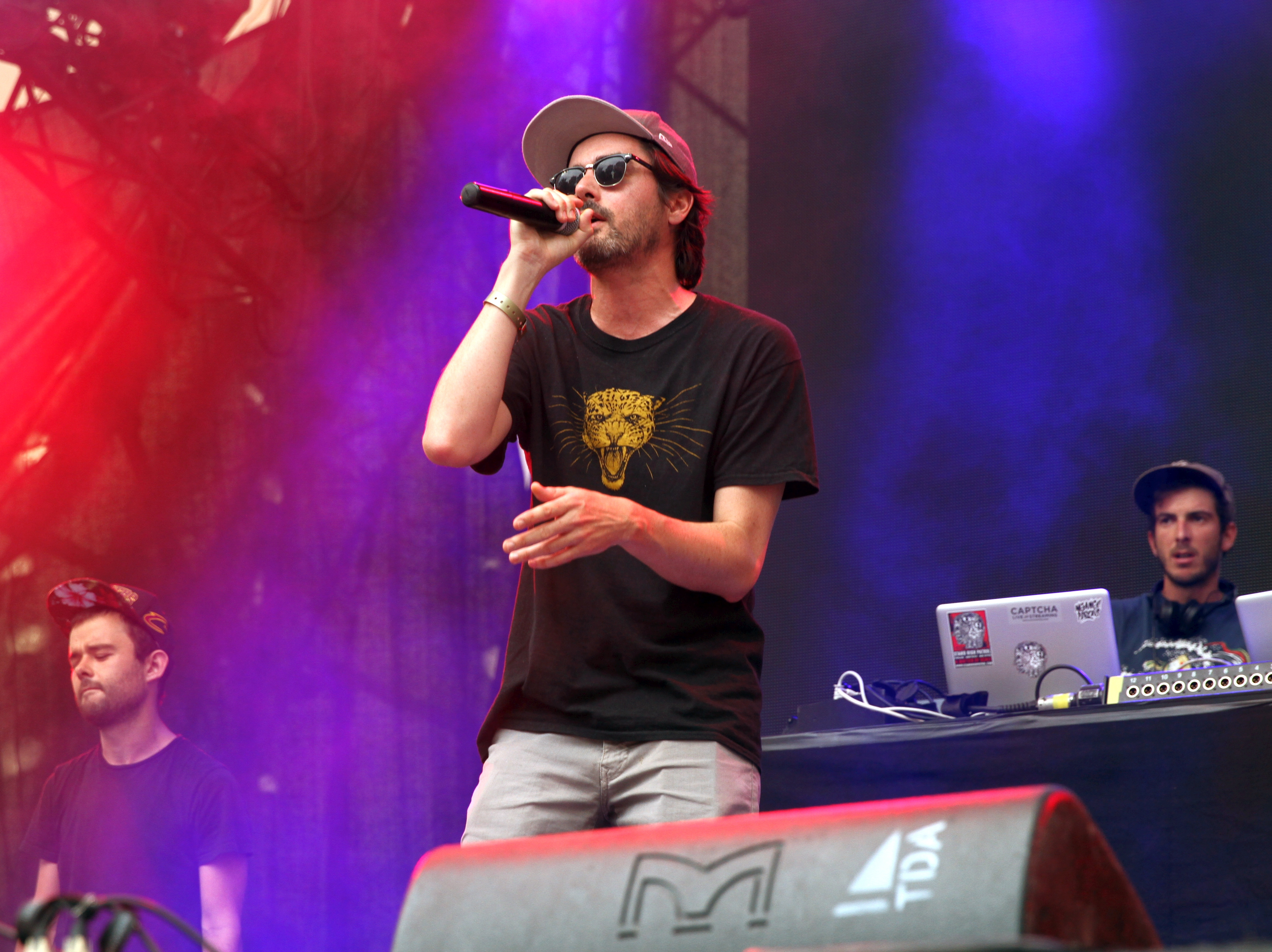
- Stand High Patrol (Summerjam, 2015)

Background information
- Origin: Brittany, France
- Genres: Reggae, dub, Hip hop
- Instrument: Sound System
- Years active: 2000-present
- Label: Stand High Records
- Members: Pupajim; Mac Gyver; Rootystep; Merry
- Website: standhighpatrol.com

Stand High Patrol are a sound system based in Brittany, France, who take influence from the traditional Jamaican sound system tradition, Reggae and dub musicians, and, more recently, from Hip Hop music. They are made up of Pupajim (MC/vocals), Mac Gyver (operator), Rootystep (selector) and Merry (trumpet). Founded in 2000, Stand High Patrol have gone on to create three full-length albums, and have made collaborations with various artists, and have performed to sell-out venues worldwide. With the release of their album The Shift in May 2017, Stand High Patrol have begun to explore a genre combining Hip-Hop with their roots in Dub and Reggae.

== Stand High Records ==
In 2009, they created their own label Stand High Records. In 2012, following the release of several EPs and singles, they released their first album : Midnight Walkers. They returned in 2015 with their second album : A Matter of Scale, featuring their trumpeter Merry. In early 2017, Stand High Records released the debut album of the dubstep artist Stepart, entitled Playground. On May 26, 2017, they released Stand High Patrol's third album: The Shift.

== Discography ==
=== Albums ===
| Year | Title | Label |
|---|---|---|
| 2012 | Midnight Walkers | Stand High Records |
| 2015 | A Matter of Scale | Stand High Records |
| 2017 | The Shift | Stand High Records |
| 2018 | Summer on Mars | Stand High Records |
| 2020 | Our Own Way | Stand High Records |
| 2025 | Underground Oasis | Stand High Records |
| 2026 | Skanking & Jacking | Stand High Records |

=== EPs and singles ===
| Year | Title | Label |
|---|---|---|
| 2010 | Amplifier | Stand High Records |
| 2013 | Unemployed | Stand High Records |
| 2017 | My Research | Stand High Records |
| 2019 | Along the River | Stand High Records |
| 2019 | In the Park | Stand High Records |
| 2020 | Jay's Life | Stand High Records |
| 2020 | Our Own Way | Stand High Records |
