= Atlantis Music Conference =

The Atlantis Music Conference and Festival is an annual event in Atlanta, founded in 1998, that aims to educate new artists about the industry through information sessions, give them exposure through talent showcases and connect them with industry professionals through networking events. The Atlantis Music Conference's original purpose was “to become the greatest platform for the discovery of new talent... Atlantis recognized early on, that by providing access, as well as education and opportunity through demo critiques, multiple panels and A&R exposure, artists were experiencing immediate results and going home with more than they had when they arrived. Knowledge became the key factor in bridging the gap between being good to being extraordinary!”

In 2007, the event celebrated its tenth year in existence. Its mission is "to provide education and networking to a combination of up and coming musicians and established music industry professionals from around the country. Bands, solo artists and groups representing all music genres are educated on the business and live performance through panels and by showcasing around Atlanta for music industry professionals (label executives, management firms, booking agencies, producers & more) and music enthusiasts."

== Registration ==
Registration prices vary due to memberships and registration date. For the 2008 Conference and Festival: students, military and members of NARAS, ASCAP, and SESAC can register for $50, if postmarked by September 12, 2008. Early registration is $100, if postmarked by May 30, 2008. Regular registration is $150, if postmarked by August 22, 2008. Last chance registration is $200, if registered by September 12, 2008. Finally, walk up registration during the conference is $250. Once a conference participant has registered, they are allowed access to all conference events. This includes educational panels, and keynote speakers, unsigned artist showcases, networking parties, exhibition area and other conference activities.

== External articles and references ==
Citations and notes
