= Dub music =

Style of reggae

Dub
- Stylistic origins: Reggae; electronic; ska; rocksteady
- Cultural origins: Late 1960s, Jamaica
- Derivative forms: Ambient; big beat; dancehall; dembow; drum and bass; dubstep; grime; hip-hop; house; jungle; post-disco; post-punk; post-rock; dub techno; trip hop

Subgenres
- Dub poetry

Fusion genres
- Dubtronica; dub techno; psydub

Other topics
- List of dub artists

Dub is a musical style that grew out of reggae in the late 1960s and early 1970s. It is commonly considered a subgenre of reggae, though it has developed to extend beyond that style. Generally, dub consists of remixes of existing recordings created by significantly manipulating the original, usually through the removal of vocal parts, emphasis of the rhythm section (the stripped-down drum-and-bass track is sometimes referred to as a riddim), the application of studio effects such as delay and reverb, and the occasional dubbing of vocal or instrumental snippets from the original version or other works.

Dub was pioneered by recording engineers and producers such as Osbourne "King Tubby" Ruddock, Hopeton "Scientist" Brown, Lee "Scratch" Perry, Errol Thompson and others beginning in the late 1960s. Augustus Pablo, who collaborated with many of these producers, is credited with bringing the distinct-sounding melodica to dub, and is also among the pioneers and creators of the genre. Similar experiments with recordings at the mixing desk outside the dancehall scene were also done by producers Clive Chin and Herman Chin Loy. These producers, especially Ruddock and Perry, looked upon the mixing console as an instrument, manipulating tracks to come up with something new and different. The Roland Space Echo was widely used by dub producers in the 1970s to produce echo and delay effects.

Dub has influenced many genres of music, including rock, most significantly the subgenre of post-punk and other kinds of punk, pop, hip-hop, post-disco, and later house, techno, ambient, electronic dance music, and trip hop. Dub was a basis for the genres of jungle and drum and bass, as well as a major influence on dubstep, with its orientation around bass and utilization of audio effects. Traditional dub has survived, and some of the originators such as Mad Professor continue to produce new material.

== Name ==
The use of the word dub in a recording context originated in the late 1920s with the advent of "talking pictures" and referred to adding a soundtrack to a film; it is an informal abbreviation of the word double. Over the next 40 years or so the term found its way into audio recording in general, often in the context of making a copy of a recording on another tape or disc.

It was in this sense that the term was first used in the Jamaican recording industry: new recordings were often initially copied onto one-off acetate discs, known colloquially as soft wax or dub and later as dubplates, for exclusive use by sound system operators; playing a song as an exclusive recording on a sound system was a good way for a producer to test the potential popularity of a recording before committing to the pressing of hundreds or thousands of copies of singles for retail sale. Initially, these acetates would simply be the standard recording of a song that was yet to be released on a single; around 1968–69, however, they started to be exclusive mixes with some or all of the vocal mixed out. Producer Bunny Lee notes:

Yeah... it was really VERSION those days – it wasn't dub yet beca' it was jus' the riddim. One day an incident: Ruddy's (sound system operator Ruddy Redwood) was cutting dub, an when it start, Smithy (recording engineer Byron Smith) look like 'im start bring on the voice and Ruddy's say: no, mek it run and 'im take the whole backing track off it. 'Im say, alright, run it again, and put in the voice. 'Im didn't do no more like that yet.

After describing how Redwood then had his deejay first play the vocal version and then the instrumental version at a dance, and how popular this novelty was, Lee continued:

The next day now, 'im start it and just bring in the riddim. Or... down in the tune, bring a little voice and drop it out again... yes. Ruddy use to handle that part himself, drop in the voice and drop it out. All Smithy do was cut the dub...

Jamaican soundsystems had always sought exclusive recordings from their origins in the late 1940s. However, when they played American rhythm & blues records through the 1950s, these were simply records that rival sound system operators didn't have and couldn't identify. This progressed from the late 1950s onwards via having local musicians record a song exclusively for play on a particular sound system to having exclusive mixes of a song on acetate, which became possible with the arrival of multi-track recording in Jamaica. From the concept of a version with some or all of the vocal mixed out dubbed to acetate, the novelty-hungry sound system scene rapidly drove the evolution of increasingly creative mixes in the first few years of the 1970s. Within a few years the term dub became attached to these regardless of whether they were on an exclusive acetate or "dubplate". As the use of the term widened and evolved, Bob Marley and the Wailers used the order "dub this one!" in live concerts to mean, "put an emphasis on bass and drums". Drummer Sly Dunbar similarly points to a usage of the related term dubwise to mean using only drums and bass.

It is possible that the existing use of the word dub for other meanings in Jamaica around the time of the music's origin may have helped to cement its use in the musical context. The most frequent meanings referred to either a form of erotic dance or sexual intercourse; such usage is frequently present in names of reggae songs, for instance, of the Silvertones' "Dub the Pum Pum" (where pum pum is Jamaican slang for female genitalia), Big Joe and Fay's "Dub a Dawta" (dawta is Jamaican patois for daughter). I-Roy's "Sister Maggie Breast" features several references on sex:

I man a-dub it on the side
Say little sister you can run but you can't hide
Slip you got to slide you got to open your crotches wide
Peace and love abide

However, all three of these songs were recorded after the use of dub for a style of remixing was already prevalent.

== Characteristics ==
According to David Toop, "Dub music is like a long echo delay, looping through time...turning the rational order of musical sequences into an ocean of sensation."

Dub music is characterized by a "version" or "double" of an existing song, often instrumental, initially almost always pressed on the B-sides of Jamaican 45-rpm records and typically emphasizing the drums and bass for a sound popular in local sound systems. A "version" is an alternative cut of a song made for the DJ to "toast" over (a form of Jamaican rapping), usually with some or all of the original vocal removed. These "versions" were used as the basis of new songs by rerecording them with new elements. The instrumental tracks are typically treated with sound effects such as echo, reverb, with instruments and vocals dropping in and out of the mix. The partial or total removal of vocals and other instruments tends to emphasise the bass guitar. The music sometimes features other noises, such as birds singing, thunder and lightning, water flowing, and producers shouting instructions at the musicians. It can be further augmented by live DJs. The many-layered sounds with varying echoes and volumes are often said to create soundscapes, or sound sculptures, drawing attention to the shape and depth of the space between sounds as well as to the sounds themselves. There is usually a distinctly organic feel to the music, even though the effects are electronically created.

Often these tracks are used for "toasters" rapping heavily rhymed and alliterative lyrics. These are called "DJ Versions". In forms of sound system–based reggae, the performer using a microphone is referred to as the "DJ" or "deejay" (where in other genres, this performer might be termed the "MC", meaning "Master of Ceremonies", or alternately, the later developed slang terms: "Microphone Commander" or "Mic Control"), and the person choosing the music and operating the turntables is called the "selector" (sometimes referred to as the DJ in other genres).

A major reason for producing multiple versions was economic; a record producer could use a recording he owned to produce numerous versions from a single studio session. A version was also an opportunity for a producer or remix engineer to experiment and express their more creative side. The version was typically the B-side of a single, and used for experimenting and providing something for DJs to talk over, while the A-side was more often dedicated to the original vocal-oriented track. In the 1970s, LPs of dub tracks began to be produced; these could be, variously: a collection of new dub mixes of riddims previously used on various singles, usually by a single producer; the dub version of an existing vocal LP with dub mixes of all the tracks; or, least commonly, a selection of previously unissued original riddims mixed in a dub style.

== History ==
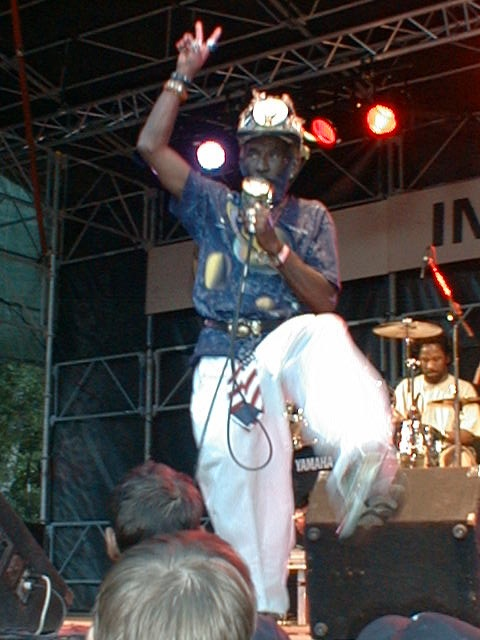
Lee "Scratch" Perry was an early pioneer of the genre.

Dub music and toasting introduced a new era of creativity in reggae music. From their beginning, toasting and dub music developed together and influenced each other. The development of sound system culture influenced the development of studio techniques in Jamaica, and the earliest DJs, including Duke Reid and Prince Buster among others, were toasting over instrumental versions of reggae and developing instrumental reggae music.

=== "Versions" and experiments with studio mixing (late 1960s) ===
In 1968, Kingston, Jamaica, sound system operator Rudolph "Ruddy" Redwood went to Duke Reid's Treasure Isle studio to cut a one-off dub plate of the Paragons hit "On the Beach". Engineer Byron Smith left the vocal track out by accident, but Redwood kept the result. At his next dance, Redwood played the instrumental version with his deejay Wassy toasting over the rhythm. He also played the original vocal and instrumental versions back to back, with the audience singing the lyrics of the original recording over the instrumental. The instrumental proved so popular that Redwood reportedly played it continuously for half an hour to an hour that night. The next day, Bunny Lee, who had witnessed the dance, told King Tubby that they needed to make more instrumental tracks, as "them people love" them, and they removed the vocals from "Ain't Too Proud To Beg" by Slim Smith. Because of King Tubby's innovative approach, the resulting instrumental track was more than just a track without a voice – King Tubby interchanged the vocals and the instrumental, playing the vocals first, then playing the riddim, then mixing them together. From this point on, they started to call such tracks "versions". The audience response also encouraged Reid to produce instrumental versions of his earlier recordings, often replacing the vocals with lead instrumentation rather than simply removing them. By the end of 1968, instrumental recordings had become increasingly widespread among Jamaican producers. Another source puts 1967 and not 1968 as the initial year of the practice of putting instrumental versions of reggae tracks to the B-side of records.

At Studio One the initial motivation to experiment with instrumental tracks and studio mixing was correcting the riddim until it had a "feel," so a singer, for instance, could comfortably sing over it.

Another reason to experiment with mixing was rivalry among sound systems. Sound systems' sound men wanted the tracks they played at dances to be slightly different each time, so they would order numerous copies of the same record from a studio, each with a different mix.

=== Evolution of dub as a subgenre (1970s) ===
By 1973, through the efforts of several independent and competitive innovators, engineers, and producers, instrumental reggae "versions" from various studios had evolved into "dub" as a subgenre of reggae. The growing popularity of dub and toasting during the early 1970s increased demand for well-recorded rhythm tracks, encouraging Jamaican producers to sell rhythm tracks to other producers.

The innovative album The Undertaker by Derrick Harriott and the Crystallites, engineered by Errol Thompson and with "Sound Effects" credited to Derrick Harriott, was one of the first strictly instrumental reggae albums on its release in 1970.

By the early 1970s, several Jamaican producers and engineers were developing dub mixes. At Randy's Recording Studio, Clive and Vincent Chin had been producing dub mixes by 1972, including sessions by the Impact All-Stars engineered by Errol Thompson. The 1973 album Java Java Java was among the earliest dub albums. Herman Chin Loy's Aquarius Dub appeared around the same period. In 1973, Lee "Scratch" Perry released Blackboard Jungle Dub, mixed in collaboration with King Tubby, another of the earliest dub albums.

In 1974, Keith Hudson released his classic Pick a Dub, widely considered to have been the first deliberately thematic dub album, with tracks specifically mixed in the dub style for the purpose of appearing together on an LP, and King Tubby released his two debut albums At the Grass Roots of Dub and Surrounded by the Dreads at the National Arena.

=== Dub history (since the early 1970s) ===
Dub has continued to evolve, its popularity waxing and waning with changes in musical fashion. Almost all reggae singles still carry an instrumental version on the B-side and these are still used by the sound systems as a blank canvas for live singers and DJs.

In 1976, the Japanese band Mute Beat would create dub music using live instruments such as trumpets rather than studio equipment, and became a precursor to club music.

In the 1970s, the United Kingdom became a new centre for dub production with Mikey Dread, Mad Professor and Jah Shaka being the most famous. It was also the time when dub made its influence known in the work of harder edged, experimental producers such as Mikey Dread with UB40 and the Clash, Adrian Sherwood and the roster of artists on his On-U Sound label. Many bands characterized as post-punk were heavily influenced by dub. Better-known bands such as the Police, the Clash and UB40 helped popularize dub, with UB40's Present Arms In Dub being the first dub album to hit the UK top 40.

Side by side with reggae at this time (early 1970s) running B side dub mixes, a rising number of American (mostly New York state and New Jersey–based) post-disco record producers in collaboration with prominent DJs decided to supply 12 inch singles with alternate dub mixes, predating the era of "remixes". Reflected in the production of records such as the Peech Boys' "Don't Make Me Wait", Toney Lee's "Reach Up", and artists mostly on New York City labels Prelude or West End. In the aforementioned mixes the beat of the record was accentuated, "unnecessary" vocal parts dropped, and other DJ-friendly features making it easy to work with, like picking out key sections to play over other records, heightening the dancefloor effect.

Contemporary instances are also called "dubtronica", "dub-techno", "steppers" or electronic music influenced by dub music.

== Musical impact ==
=== Influence of dub ===
Yale professor Michael Veal described dub as "the sound of a society tearing itself apart at the seams". His book, "Starship Africa", says that the African diaspora is reflected in dub by the "extensive use of reverberation/delay devices and the fragmentation of the song surface" – he considers dub's use of reverb a "sonic metaphor for the condition of diaspora." Veal wrote that dub creators used echo and reverb to elicit memories of African culture in their listeners. King Tubby, Lee Perry, Erroll Thompson, Mad Professor, Jah Shaka, Denis Bovell and Linton Kwesi Johnson influenced rock musicians. From the 1980s forward, dub has been influenced by, and has in turn influenced, techno, dubtronica/dub techno, jungle, drum and bass, dubstep, house music, punk and post-punk, trip hop, ambient music, and hip-hop, with electronic dub sound. Musicians and bands such as Culture Club, Bill Laswell, Jah Wobble, New Age Steppers, Public Image Ltd, the Pop Group, the Police, Massive Attack, the Clash, Adrian Sherwood, Killing Joke, Bauhaus and others demonstrate clear dub influences in their respective genres, and their innovations have in turn influenced the mainstream of the dub genre.

In 1987, US grunge rock band Soundgarden released a dub version of the Ohio Players' song "Fopp" alongside a more traditional rock cover of the song. DJs appeared towards the end of the 1990s who specialised in playing music by these musicians, such as the UK's Unity Dub.

The documentary Dub Echoes (SoulJazz Records, 2008), directed by Brazilian journalist Bruno Natal, tells the story of dub's birth and its broader reach through the voices of those who were there. Through interviews with over 40 key figures (including Lee Perry, Bunny Lee, Sly & Robbie, U-Roy, Adrian Sherwood, Thievery Corporation, Basement Jaxx and Kode 9) the film maps the connections between dub, hip-hop and electronic music, showing how the Jamaican invention of dub transformed the recording studio into a musical instrument, laying the groundwork for much of the music heard today.

In the UK, Europe, and America, independent record producers continue to produce dub. Before forming The Mars Volta, Cedric Bixler, Omar Rodriguez and other members, recorded a series of dub albums under the name De Facto since 1999.

=== Influence of dub on punk and rock music ===
Since the inception of dub in the late 1960s, its history has been intertwined with that of the punk rock scene in the UK. The Clash worked on collaborations involving Jamaican dub reggae creators like Lee "Scratch" Perry (whose "Police & Thieves", co-written with Junior Murvin, was covered by the Clash on their first album) and Mikey Dread (on the Sandinista! album and Bankrobber single). As well, the English group Ruts DC, a post-Malcolm Owen incarnation of the reggae influenced punk group the Ruts, released Rhythm Collision Dub Volume 1 (Roir session), with the expertise of the Mad Professor. Many punk rock bands In the U.S. were exposed to dub via the rasta punk band Bad Brains from Washington, D.C., which was established and released their most influential material during the 1980s. Blind Idiot God placed dub music alongside their faster and more intense noise rock tracks. Dub was adopted by some punk rock groups of the 90s, with bands such as Rancid and NOFX writing original songs in a dub style. Often, bands considered to be ska punk play dub influenced songs; one of the first such bands to become popular was Sublime, whose albums featured both dub originals and remixes. They went on to influence more recent American bands such as Rx Bandits and the Long Beach Dub Allstars. In addition, dub influenced some types of pop, including bands such as No Doubt. No Doubt's fifth album, Rock Steady, features an assortment of popular dub sounds like reverb and echoing. As noted by the band themselves, No Doubt is heavily influenced by Jamaican musical aesthetics and production techniques, even recording their Rock Steady album in Kingston, Jamaica, and producing B-sides featuring dub influences on their Everything in Time B-sides album. Some controversy still exists on whether pop-ska bands like No Doubt can regard themselves as a part of dub lineage. Other bands followed in the footsteps of No Doubt, fusing pop-ska and dub influences, such as Save Ferris and Vincent.

There are also some British punk bands creating dub music. Capdown released their Civil Disobedients album, featuring the track "Dub No. 1", while Sonic Boom Six and The King Blues take heavy influences from dub, mixing the genre with original punk ethics and attitudes. The post-punk band Public Image Ltd, fronted by John Lydon, formerly of Sex Pistols, often use dub and reggae influenced bass lines in their music, especially in their earlier music through various bassists who were members of the group, such as Jah Wobble and Jonas Hellborg. Their track "Rise", which reached No. 11 in the UK Chart in 1986 uses a dub/reggae influenced bass line.

The British post-punk band Bauhaus were highly influenced by dub music, so far that Bauhaus' bass player, David J mentioned that their signature song, "Bela Lugosi's Dead", "was our interpretation of dub".

Shoegaze bands such as Ride with their song "King Bullshit" and the intro to "Time Machine" have explored and experimented with dub. Slowdive also penned "Souvlaki Space Station" and their instrumental "Moussaka Chaos" as a testimony of dub influence, while the Kitchens of Distinction released "Anvil Dub".

Steve Hogarth, singer with British rock band Marillion, acknowledged the influence of dub on their 2001 album Anoraknophobia.

Al Cisneros, founder and bassist of Doom Metal outfit OM has gone on record regarding the influence of Reggae and Dub on his bass playing style.

Industrial metal band Godflesh have released two dub versions of their albums. In 1997 the band released Love and Hate in Dub (a remix of Songs of Love and Hate from the previous year) and in 2024 the band released A World Lit Only by Dub (a remix of A World Lit Only by Fire from 2014). A five-track 'In Dub' set was played live as part of a Godflesh performance in October 2025 at the Scala venue in London. This performance was notable as being the band's first live dub set since a performance of tracks from Love and Hate in Dub in 1997. JK Flesh, an electronic solo project by Justin Broadrick from Godflesh, also contains influences from dub music.

== 21st-century dub ==
Traditional dub has survived, and some of the originators of dub such as Lee "Scratch" Perry and Mad Professor have produced music in the 21st century. New artists continue to preserve the traditional dub sound, some with slight modifications but with a primary focus on reproducing the original characteristics of the sound in a live environment. Some of these artists include Dubblestandart from Vienna, Austria (who recorded the album Return from Planet Dub in collaboration with, and performing live with, Lee "Scratch" Perry); Liquid Stranger from Sweden; New York City artists, including Ticklah (also known as Victor Axelrod, Earl Maxton, Calbert Walker, and Douglass & Degraw), Victor Rice, Easy Star All-Stars, and Dub Trio—who have recorded and performed live with Mike Patton and are currently touring as the backing band for Matisyahu); Subatomic Sound System (who have remixed material by Lee "Scratch" Perry and Ari Up); Dub Is a Weapon; King Django; Dr. Israel; Giant Panda Guerilla Dub Squad from Rochester, New York; the Heavyweight Dub Champion from San Francisco and Colorado, Gaudi; Ott from the UK, who has released several influential albums through Twisted Records, Boom One Sound System, and Dubsmith from the Boom One Records label; Future Pigeon from Los Angeles; German artists like Disrupt and Rootah from the Jahtari label; Twilight Circus from the Netherlands; Moonlight Dub Experiment from Costa Rica; and Stand High Patrol from France. More eclectic use of dub techniques are apparent in the work of BudNubac, which mixes Cuban big band with dub techniques. Modern dub producer Ryan Moore has received critical acclaim for his Twilight Circus project. In 2022 was released Sly & Robbie vs. Roots Radics "The Dub Battle" produced by the Argentine artist and dub engineer Hernan "Don Camel" Sforzini, this work is the first to reunite all the legends of dub in one album dubbing the entire "The Final Battle" album, Grammy nominated in 2019. This album includes the last dubs produced by Lee "Scratch" Perry and Bunny "Striker" Lee, also dub versions produced by King Jammy, Mad Professor, Dennis Bovell, Don Camel and two unreleased dub versions of King Tubby.

== Afrofuturism and diaspora ==
Dub music is in conversation with the cultural aesthetic of Afrofuturism. Having emerged from Jamaica, this genre is regarded as the product of diaspora peoples, whose culture reflects the experience of dislocation, alienation and remembrance. Through the creation of space-filling soundscapes, faded echoes, and repetition within musical tracks, Dub artists are able to tap into such Afrofuturist concepts as the nonlinearity of time and the projection of past sounds into an unknown future space. In a 1982 essay, Luke Ehrlich describes Dub through this particular scope:

With dub, Jamaican music spaced out completely. If reggae is Africa in the New World, then dub must be Africa on the moon; it's the psychedelic music I expected to hear in the '60s and didn't. The bass and drums conjure up a dark, vast space, a musical portrait of outer space, with sounds suspended like glowing planets or the fragments of instruments careening by, leaving trails like comets and meteors. Dub is a kaleidoscopic musical montage which takes sounds originally intended as interlocking parts of another arrangement and using them as raw material, converts them into new and different sounds; then, in its own rhythm and format, it continually reshuffles these new sounds into unusual juxtapositions.

At the same time, dub music's role in the Black musical canon marks a theme of the diaspora the music was birthed from. Due to the sonic structure of echoes and reverberations, dub can create a dream-like world symbolizing the generational trauma of African diaspora as a result of slavery. This understanding of dub gives it the power to take on the darker emotions related to the diaspora, including violence. In King Tubby's dub mixes, one can hear sonic elements of screeching tires, gun fire, and police sirens. Artist Arthur Jafa said this about dub music and the diaspora in 1994 during a keynote address at the Organization of Black Designers Conference:

Those group experiences that reconfigure who we [African Americans] are as a community. One of the critical primal sites would be the Middle Passage. If you understand the level of horror directed towards a group of people, then you start getting some sense of the magnitude, impact, and level of trauma that that had on the African American community, and how it was particularly one of the earliest group experiences that reshaped an "African psyche" into the beginning of an African American psyche. ... Now, for example, you look at Black music and see certain structural things that really are about reclaiming this whole sense of absence, loss, not knowing. One of the things I'm thinking about is dub music ... it ends up really speaking about common experiences because the structure of the music is about things dropping out and coming back in, really reclaiming this whole sense of loss, rupture, and repair that is very common across the experience of black people in the diaspora.

William Gibson frequently mentions dub in the 1984 science fiction novel Neuromancer.

As they worked, Case gradually became aware of the music that pulsed constantly through the cluster. It was called dub, a sensuous mosaic cooked from vast libraries of digitalized pop; it was worship, Molly said, and a sense of community. Case heaved at one of the yellow sheets; the thing was light but still awkward. Zion smelled of cooked vegetables, humanity, and ganja.

"We monitor many frequencies. We listen always. Came a voice, out of the babel of tongues, speaking to us. It played us a mighty dub."

== Jamaican sound systems ==
The most straightforward explanation of the Jamaican sound system would be an individual who deals with a mechanical system consisting of musical amplification and diffusion. This would include turntables, speakers, and a PA system. In this system the deejay is the person who speaks over the record. This is not to be confused with the American term DJ, which refers to the one in charge of selecting the tracks at an event with music. This role is known as the selector in the sound system dub culture, who also plays a vital role in the system, especially in Jamaican dancehalls.

The sound system has had a prevalent spot in music production in Jamaica for well over 60 years. The true importance and relationship between the sound system and dub music can be found in the dubbed out versions of sounds that became the source of Dub music. These dubbed out versions of songs consisted of the original track, without the vocals. Through reggae soundscape and the Jamaican Sound System, dub artists were able to creatively manipulate these dubbed out versions or remixes of songs. These dub remixes were heavily influenced with effects, vocal samples, and were essential to the progression of dub. The remixes, often referred to as versions were the B-sides of a specific record. The dub musician would add in dramatic pauses and breakdowns in the version to make the song have a dub influence and feel. The artists who were using the sound system to create dub tracks would refer to their creation of remixes of certain records versioning. In the setting of a sound system, versions allow for more vocal improvisation and expressions from the deejay. These remixes or versions would not have been possible without the Jamaican sound system and its progression over the years.

At the time Jamaica gained independence from Britain in 1962, the culture was in flux, and the country was experiencing a form of identity crisis. Throughout the 40's and 50's Jamaican audiences had come to favor American R&B records over locally produced music. Jamaican sound system culture and dub music helped cement Jamaican musical forms into Jamaican national cultural identity in this critical time in the nation's development.

== See also ==
- List of dub artists
- List of electronic music genres
