= From Here to Now to You Live =

Live album (EP) by Jack Johnson
- Released: April 22, 2014
- Recorded: 2013
- Genre: Rock; pop rock
- Length: 22:43
- Label: Brushfire
- Producer: Mario Caldato Jr.

Jack Johnson chronology
| From Here to Now to You (2013) | From Here to Now to You Live (2014) | All the Light Above It Too (2017) |

From Here to Now to You Live is an EP by American musician Jack Johnson. The EP was released on April 22, 2014 in celebration of Earth Day.

== Recording ==
All of the songs recorded were during his 2013 From Here to Now to You Tour with musicians Zach Gill, Adam Topol, Merlo Podlewski, and Paula Fuga. The EP's six tracks were all recorded in different venues.

== Promotion ==
To promote the EP, Johnson visited Mililani Mauka Elementary School in Hawaii on Earth-Day 2014. Jack also performed all of the songs featured on the EP including others during the kids' lunchtime at the school. Johnson also started the "2014 Hawaii School Bottle Cap Challenge" sponsored by the Kokua Foundation. Throughout 2014, 21,862 pounds of plastic bottle caps were collected throughout Hawaii's waste stream. Johnson made many news headlines in Hawaii because of this challenge.

== Release ==
The EP was officially announced two days before its official release on April 20, 2014. The EP was released on April 20, 2014 as a digital download and on CD. All the profits made from the EP went to the Kokua Foundation, which is co-run by Johnson himself.

== Track list ==
All tracks are written by Jack Johnson.

| No. | Title | Length |
|---|---|---|
| 1. | "As I Was Saying (Live)" | 4:01 |
| 2. | "Washing Dishes (Live)" | 3:45 |
| 3. | "Don't Believe a Thing I Say (Live)" | 3:56 |
| 4. | "Shot Reverse Shot (Live)" | 3:28 |
| 5. | "Tape Deck (Live)" | 3:57 |
| 6. | "Home (Live)" | 3:36 |
| Total length: | | 22:43 |

== Charts ==
| Chart (2014) | Peak position |
|---|---|
| US Alternative Albums (Billboard) | 8 |
| US Americana/Folk Albums (Billboard) | 1 |
| US Billboard 200 (Billboard) | 35 |
| US Digital Albums (Billboard) | 11 |
| US Rock Albums (Billboard) | 10 |
