= From Here to Now to You Tour =

2013–14 concert tour by Jack Johnson

- Tour by Jack Johnson
- Associated album: From Here to Now to You
- Start date: September 5, 2013
- End date: September 1, 2014
- Legs: 7
- No. of shows: 88

Jack Johnson concert chronology
- To The Sea World Tour (2010); From Here to Now to You Tour (2013–14); All the Light Above it Too World Tour (2017–19)

The From Here to Now to You Tour is the sixth concert tour by American recording artist Jack Johnson. The album promotes Johnson's sixth studio album, From Here to Now to You (2013). The tour played over 80 shows in Europe, the Americas, Australasia and Asia.

== Opening acts ==
- Bahamas (North America—Leg 1, select dates)
- Edward Sharpe and the Magnetic Zeros (North America—Leg 2, select dates)
- Amos Lee (North America—Leg 2, select dates)
- Michael Kiwanuka (North America—Leg 2, select dates)
- Animal Liberation Orchestra (St. Augustine, Cary)

== Setlist ==
The following setlist was obtained the concert held on October 19, 2013; at the Orpheum Theatre in Los Angeles, California. It does not represent all concerts for the duration of the tour.

1. "Do You Remember"
2. "Good People"
3. "As I Was Saying"
4. "Washing Dishes"
5. "Taylor"
6. "Flake"
7. "Tomorrow Morning"
8. "Bubble Toes" / "The Joker" / "At or with Me" / "Crosstown Traffic"
9. "Wasting Time"
10. "If I Had Eyes"
11. "Inaudible Melodies"
12. "Radiate"
13. "Don't Believe a Thing I Say"
14. "Breakdown"
15. "Tape Deck"
16. "Banana Pancakes"
17. "Shot Reverse Shot"
18. "Sitting, Waiting, Wishing" (contains excerpts from "Just What I Needed")
19. "Staple It Together"
20. "Mudfootball"

Encore

21. "I Got You"
22. "Country Road"
23. "Turn Your Love"
24. "Better Together"
25. "Home"

== Tour dates ==
Date	City	Country	Venue
Europe
September 5, 2013	Cologne	Germany	E-Werk
September 6, 2013	Munich	Germany	Kronebau
September 7, 2013	Amsterdam	Netherlands	Heineken Music Hall
September 8, 2013^{[A]}	London	England	Hyde Park
September 11, 2013	Salford	England	Lyric Theatre
September 12, 2013	Birmingham	England	Symphony Hall
September 14, 2013	Paris	France	L'Olympia
September 16, 2013^{[B]}	London	England	Roundhouse
North America
September 21, 2013^{[C]}	Saratoga Springs	United States	Saratoga Performing Arts Center
September 22, 2013^{[D]}	Canton	United States	Prowse Farm
September 23, 2013	New York City	United States	United Palace
September 25, 2013	Washington, D.C.	United States	DAR Constitution Hall
September 26, 2013	Upper Darby Township	United States	Tower Theater
September 28, 2013	Toronto	Canada	Massey Hall
September 29, 2013	Akron	United States	E. J. Thomas Performing Arts Hall
October 1, 2013	Atlanta	United States	Fox Theatre
October 2, 2013	Nashville	United States	Ryman Auditorium
October 3, 2013	Durham	United States	Durham Performing Arts Center
October 5, 2013	Indianapolis	United States	Murat Theatre
October 6, 2013	Chicago	United States	Chicago Theatre
October 7, 2013	Minneapolis	United States	State Theatre
October 9, 2013	Denver	United States	Paramount Theatre
October 12, 2013	Oakland	United States	Fox Oakland Theatre
October 14, 2013	Vancouver	Canada	Orpheum Theatre
October 15, 2013	Seattle	United States	Paramount Theatre
October 16, 2013	Portland	United States	Schnitzer Concert Hall
October 18, 2013	San Diego	United States	Balboa Theatre
October 19, 2013	Los Angeles	United States	Orpheum Theatre
October 20, 2013	Santa Barbara	United States	Arlington Theater
Australasia
December 3, 2013	Auckland	New Zealand	ASB Theatre
December 4, 2013	Auckland	New Zealand	ASB Theatre
December 7, 2013	Perth	Australia	Kings Park
December 10, 2013	Sydney	Australia	Opera House Forecourt
December 11, 2013	Sydney	Australia	Opera House Forecourt
December 12, 2013	Sydney	Australia	Opera House Forecourt
December 14, 2013	Brisbane	Australia	QPAC Concert Hall
December 16, 2013	Melbourne	Australia	MCEC Plenary Hall
December 17, 2013	Melbourne	Australia	MCEC Plenary Hall
South America
March 3, 2014	Lima	Peru	Parque de la Exposición
March 5, 2014	Santiago	Chile	Movistar Arena
March 8, 2014^{[E]}	Vicente López	Argentina	Complejo Al Río
March 10, 2014	Asunción	Paraguay	Yacht & Golf Club Paraguayo
March 13, 2014	Rio de Janeiro	Brazil	Jeunesse Arena
March 14, 2014	São Paulo	Brazil	Espaço das Américas
March 15, 2014	Florianópolis	Brazil	Devassa on Stage
North America
March 20, 2014^{[F]}	Papantla	Mexico	El Tajín
Australasia
April 18, 2014^{[G]}	Byron Bay	Australia	Tyagarah Tea Tree Farm
North America
May 18, 2014^{[H]}	Gulf Shores	United States	Gulf Shores Public Beach
May 20, 2014	St. Augustine	United States	St. Augustine Amphitheatre
May 21, 2014	Cary	United States	Koka Booth Amphitheatre
May 23, 2014^{[I]}	Boston	United States	City Hall Plaza
May 24, 2014	Saratoga Springs	United States	Saratoga Performing Arts Center
May 28, 2014	Toronto	Canada	Molson Canadian Amphitheatre
May 30, 2014	Cuyahoga Falls	United States	Blossom Music Center
May 31, 2014	Chicago	United States	FirstMerit Bank Pavilion
June 1, 2014	Indianapolis	United States	Farm Bureau Insurance Lawn
June 3, 2014	Alpharetta	United States	Verizon Wireless Amphitheatre
June 5, 2014	Columbia	United States	Merriweather Post Pavilion
June 6, 2014	Philadelphia	United States	Mann Center for the Performing Arts
June 7, 2014	Wantagh	United States	Nikon at Jones Beach Theater
June 10, 2014^{[J]}	New York City	United States	Prospect Park Bandshell
June 19, 2014^{[K]}	Dover	United States	Dover International Speedway
Europe
June 29, 2014^{[L]}	London	England	Clapham Common
July 1, 2014	Paris	France	L'Olympia
July 2, 2014	Paris	France	L'Olympia
July 4, 2014^{[M]}	Werchter	Belgium	Werchter Festivalpark
July 5, 2014^{[N]}	Arras	France	Citadelle d'Arras
July 7, 2014^{[O]}	Saint-Malô-du-Bois	France	Théâtre de verdure de Poupet
July 11, 2014^{[P]}	Bilbao	Spain	Kobetamendi
July 12, 2014^{[Q]}	Barcelona	Spain	Parc del Fòrum
July 14, 2014^{[R]}	Pistoia	Italy	Piazza del Duomo
July 15, 2014^{[S]}	Locarno	Switzerland	Piazza Grande
July 19, 2014^{[T]}	Filleigh	England	Castle Hill
July 20, 2014	London	England	Eventim Apollo
July 23, 2014^{[U]}	Nyon	Switzerland	Plaine de l'Asse
Asia
July 27, 2014^{[V]}	Yuzawa	Japan	Naeba Ski Resort
North America
August 1, 2014	Honolulu	United States	Waikiki Shell
August 2, 2014	Honolulu	United States	Waikiki Shell
August 18, 2014	Morrison	United States	Red Rocks Amphitheatre
August 21, 2014	Burnaby	Canada	Festival Lawn
August 23, 2014	George	United States	The Gorge Amphitheatre
August 24, 2014	Bend	United States	Les Schwab Amphitheater
August 26, 2014	Berkeley	United States	Hearst Greek Theatre
August 27, 2014	Los Angeles	United States	Greek Theatre
August 28, 2014	Los Angeles	United States	Greek Theatre
August 30, 2014	San Diego	United States	RIMAC Field
August 31, 2014	Santa Barbara	United States	Santa Barbara Bowl
September 1, 2014	Santa Barbara	United States	Santa Barbara Bowl

Festivals and other miscellaneous performances

^{A} This concert was a part of "Radio 2 Live in Hyde Park"
^{B} This concert was a part of the "iTunes Festival"
^{C} This concert was a part of "Farm Aid"
^{D} This concert was a part of the "Life is Good Festival"
^{E} This concert was a part of "Movistar Free Music"
^{F} This concert was a part of "Cumbre Tajín"
^{G} This concert was a part of the "Byron Bay Bluesfest"
^{H} This concert was a part of the "Hangout Music Festival"
^{I} This concert was a part of "Boston Calling"
^{J} This concert was a part of "Celebrate Brooklyn!"
^{K} This concert was a part of the "Firefly Music Festival"
^{L} This concert was a part of the "Calling Festival"
^{M} This concert was a part of "Rock Werchter"
^{N} This concert was a part of the "Main Square Festival"
^{O} This concert was a part of the "Festival de Poupet"
^{P} This concert was a part of "Bilbao BBK Live"
^{Q} This concert was a part of "Festival Cruïlla"
^{R} This concert was a part of the "Pistoia Blues Festival"
^{S} This concert was a part of "Moon and Stars"
^{T} This concert was a part of the "Somersault Festival"
^{U} This concert was a part of the "Paléo Festival"
^{V} This concert was a part of the "Fuji Rock Festival"

=== Box office score data ===
Venue	City	Tickets sold / Available	Gross revenue
Fox Theatre	Atlanta	4,324 / 4,424 (98%)	$289,121
Ryman Auditorium	Nashville	2,241 / 2,241 (100%)	$154,364
Chicago Theatre	Chicago	3,444 / 3,444 (100%)	$227,304
State Theatre	Minneapolis	2,059 / 2,059 (100%)	$135,625
Fox Oakland Theatre	Oakland	2,800 / 2,800 (100%)	$194,600
Balboa Theatre	San Diego	1,339 / 1,339 (100%)	$84,186
Orpheum Theatre	Los Angeles	1,991 / 1,991 (100%)	$125,475
Arlington Theater	Santa Barbara	1,984 / 1,984 (100%)	$129,365
Parque de la Exposición	Lima	6,061 / 6,061 (100%)	$437,164
Jeunesse Arena	Rio de Janeiro	7,611 / 9,000 (85%)	$474,647
Espaço das Américas	São Paulo	7,165 / 7,165 (100%)	$477,824
Devassa on Stage	Florianópolis	8,000 / 8,000 (100%)	$385,572
Mann Center for the Performing Arts	Philadelphia	13,620 / 13,620 (100%)	$606,765
Hearst Greek Theatre	Berkeley	8,359 / 8,359 (100%)	$532,369
Greek Theatre	Los Angeles	11,484 / 11,484 (100%)	$725,826
RIMAC Field	San Diego	19,907 / 19,907 (100%)	$873,427
Santa Barbara Bowl	Santa Barbara	9,946 / 9,946 (100%)	$525,260
TOTAL		112,335 / 113,824 (99%)	$6,378,894
