= A Brokedown Melody =

- Directed by: Jack Johnson; Chris Malloy
- Produced by: Tim Lynch; Emmett Malloy
- Starring: Kelly Slater; The Malloys; Tom Curren; Rob Machado; CJ Hobgood; Jack Johnson
- Cinematography: David Homcy; Sonny Miller; Scott Soens; Dustin Lynn
- Edited by: Clark Eddy; Dustin Lynn
- Music by: Brushfire Records
- Production company: Woodshed Films
- Distributed by: Studio 411 (DVD); Wasserman Media Group (DVD)
- Release date: September 16, 2004
- Running time: 55 minutes
- Language: English

A Brokedown Melody is a 2004 documentary surf film from Woodshed Films directed by singer/songwriter Jack Johnson and his film school friend Chris Malloy. Presented as a special screening to benefit the Kōkua Hawai'i Foundation at the Hawaii Theatre in Honolulu on August 11, 2004, the film had premieres during the fall of 2004 at the Malibu International Film Festival (MIFF) on September 16, 2004, at the Laguna Beach Festival of Arts during the 2nd annual Moonshine Festival on October 9, 2004, at the Arlington Theater in Santa Barbara in October, 2004, and at the Hawai'i International Film Festival (HIFF) in Honolulu in October, 2004. It is the fourth of The Moonshine Conspiracy films.

Combining a wide range of styles of guitar music for the soundtrack, the film captures award-winning cinematography from surfing footage of various locations worldwide: Chile, Hawaii, Mexico, Jamaica, Tahiti in French Polynesia, and Indonesia. Surfers in the film include Tom Curren, Gerry Lopez, C. J. Hobgood, Rob Machado, and Kelly Slater. Also, Jeff Johnson, Jack Johnson's father, and a very youthful John John Florence make special appearances.

== Cast ==
In alphabetical order:

- Mark Cunningham
- Tom Curren
- CJ Hobgood
- Jack Johnson
- Gerry Lopez
- Rob Machado
- Chris Malloy
- Dan Malloy
- Emmett Malloy
- Keith Malloy
- Kelly Slater

== Synopsis ==
The film explores the times, travels and experiences of a tribe of surfers who search for the spark of life and look to pass it on to the younger generation. Surfing on all sorts of boards, the stoked tribe finds plentiful, insanely good waves and no crowds.

== Soundtrack ==
Released by Brushfire Records on November 14, 2006, the soundtrack to A Brokedown Melody, which is scored by Johnson, collects 12 previously unavailable tracks by the likes of Culver City Dub Collective, Kings of Convenience, Johnny Osbourne, M. Ward, The Beta Band, Doug Martsch, Matt Costa, Eddie Vedder, and Johnson himself.

=== Track listing ===
1. "The Cave" – 3:10 (Culver City Dub Collective)
2. "Breakdown" – 3:28 (Jack Johnson)
3. "Know-How" – 3:54 (Kings of Convenience)
4. "We Need Love" – 3:48 (Johnny Osbourne)
5. "Transfiguration #1" – 2:40 (M. Ward)
6. "Let It Be Sung" – 4:08 (Jack Johnson)
7. "Goodbye" – 2:19 (Eddie Vedder)
8. "Needles In My Eyes" – 4:16 (The Beta Band)
9. "Window" – 3:55 (Doug Martsch)
10. "The Road" – 2:27 (Matt Costa)
11. "Vuelvo Al Sur" – 5:52 (Astor Piazzolla)
12. "Home" – 3:32 (Jack Johnson)

=== Re-releases ===
"Breakdown" was re-released as a single from the multi-platinum (Australia, Canada, US, UK) top of the charts album In Between Dreams. The re-release peaked at #40 on the U.S. Billboard Modern Rock Tracks Charts on January 14, 2006. On the live DVD Jack Johnson – A Weekend at the Greek & Live in Japan, Johnson reveals that the song was written on a train ride from Paris to Hossegor, a famous surf break 20 km north of Biarritz or 150 km south of Bordeaux in Landes of southwestern France. The video for "Breakdown" is from A Brokedown Melody and features Johnson surfing at Pichilemu, a famous surf break 220 km southwest of Santiago in central Chile.

"Let It Be Sung" was re-released with the CD single "If I Had Eyes", which peaked at #7 on the U.S. Billboard Modern Rock Tracks Charts on March 22, 2008, from Johnson's top of the charts album Sleep Through the Static.

"Goodbye" was re-released on Eddie Vedder's Ukulele Songs.

"Home" (acoustic) was re-released as an exclusive track available on foreign (Australia, Japan, UK, etc.) releases of Johnson's top of the charts album Sleep Through the Static. From Here to Now to You contains a 2013 version and, in July 2013, HBO Sports released a video of "Home (Live from the Beach)" with Jack and Kelly Slater playing guitars together.

== Bonus material ==
- "With My Own Two Hands" – 4:34 Ben Harper video from The Moonshine Conspiracy
- "Diamonds on the Inside" – 4:27 Ben Harper video from the Moonshine Conspiracy
- "Taylor" Outtakes – a humorous poser from southern California, played by Ben Stiller, talking about his surfing abilities to two locals from the Hawaiian Islands.

== Awards and honors ==
Best Cinematography (2005) from Surfer for Dave Homcy.
