= The Malloys =

American film and music video directors

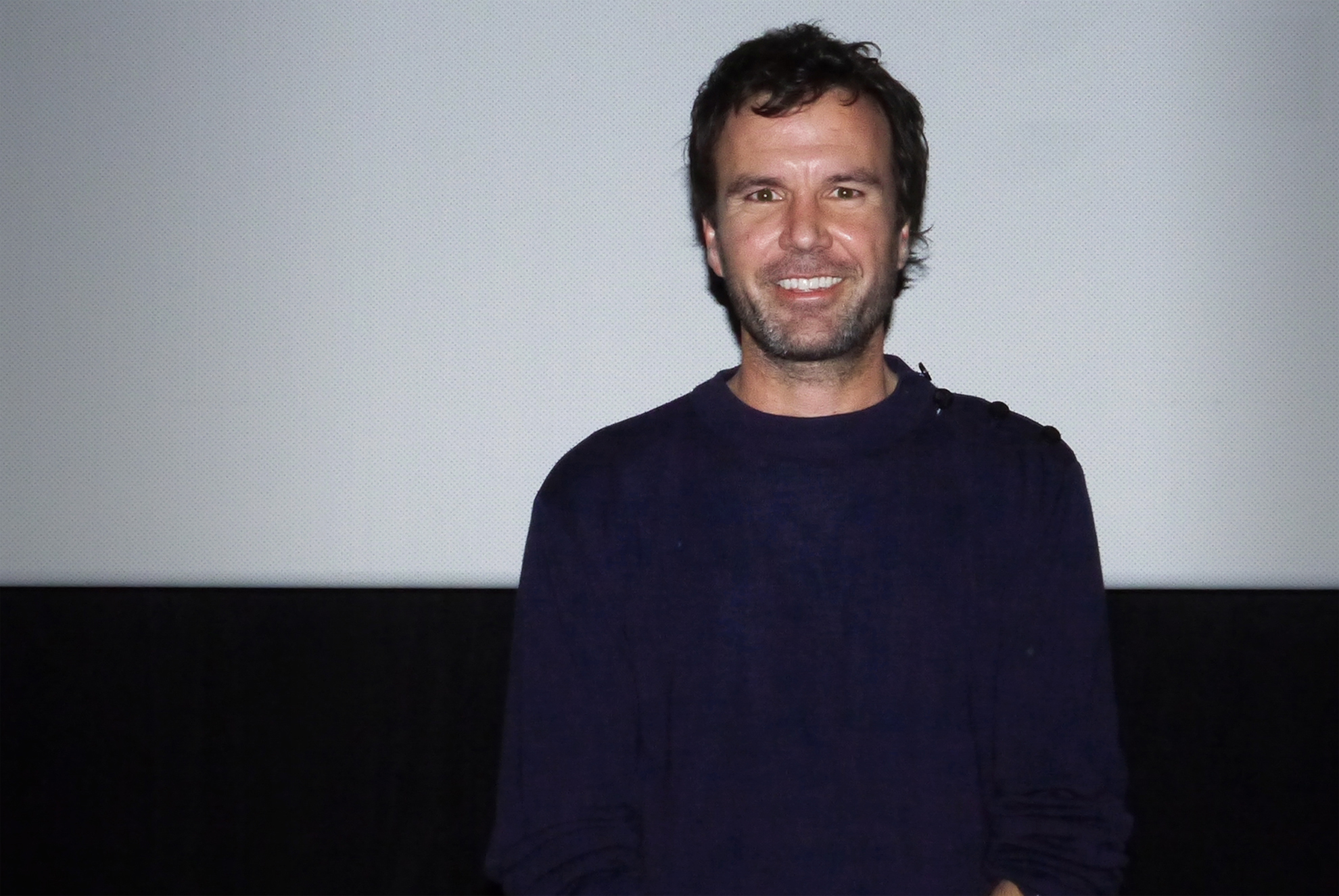
Emmet Malloy in 2014

The Malloys is the working name of music video and film directors and brothers Emmett Malloy and Brendan Malloy. They have been with Superprime Films since 2010.

== Videography ==
- "DANCE WITH ME" by blink-182 (2023)
- "Holiday" by Vampire Weekend (2010)
- "Love Dealer" by Esmée Denters featuring Justin Timberlake (2010)
- "Blah Blah Blah" by Kesha featuring 3OH!3 (2010)
- "Giving Up the Gun" by Vampire Weekend (2010)
- "Substitution" by Silversun Pickups (2009)
- "Hate Everyone" by Say Anything (2009)
- "Community Property" by Steel Panther (2009)
- "Fallin' for You" by Colbie Caillat (2009)
- "Don't Wanna Cry" by Pete Yorn (2009)
- "Sooner or Later" by N*E*R*D (2009)
- "Troublemaker" by Weezer (2008)
- "Dig Out Your Soul in the Streets" (short film) by Oasis (2008)
- "Single Fins & Safety Pins" by Japanese Motors (2008)
- "Caravan Girl" by Goldfrapp (2008)
- "Cigarette Eyes" by Matt Costa (2008)
- "Always Where I Need to Be" by The Kooks (2008)
- "Love Is Free" by Sheryl Crow (2008)
- "Always Be" by Jimmy Eat World (2008)
- "You Don't Know What Love Is (You Just Do as You're Told)" by The White Stripes (2007)
- "Icky Thump" by The White Stripes (2007)
- "Built to Last" by Mêlée (2007)
- "Hang Me Up to Dry" by Cold War Kids (2007)
- "Girlfriend" by Avril Lavigne (2007)
- "Work It Out" by Jurassic 5 featuring Dave Matthews Band (2006)
- "The Adventure" by Angels & Airwaves (2006)
- "Face Up" by Ted Lennon (2006)
- "Cold December" by Matt Costa (2006)
- "Dimension" by Wolfmother (2006)
- "Upside Down" by Jack Johnson (2006)
- "Better Together" by Jack Johnson (2006)
- "Mind's Eye" by Wolfmother (2005)
- "I'm Feeling You" by Santana (2005)
- "Landed" by Ben Folds (2005)
- "My Doorbell" by The White Stripes (2005)
- "Don't Phunk With My Heart" by The Black Eyed Peas (2005)
- "Sitting Waiting Wishing" by Jack Johnson (2005)
- "He Wasn't" by Avril Lavigne (2005)
- "New Slang" (version 2) by The Shins (2005)
- "Afternoon Delight" by Starland Vocal Band/Will Ferrell (2004)
- "Cold and Empty" by Kid Rock (2004)
- "Last Summer" by Lostprophets (2004)
- "The Unnamed Feeling" by Metallica (2004)
- "Shut Up" by The Black Eyed Peas (2003)
- "Diamonds on the Inside" by Ben Harper (2003)
- "St. Anger" by Metallica (2003)
- "Drowning" by Crazy Town (2003)
- "The Road I'm On" by 3 Doors Down (2003)
- "Head on Collision" by New Found Glory (2002)
- "The Taste of Ink" by The Used (2002)
- "Crew Deep" by Skillz featuring Missy "Misdemeanor" Elliott and Kandi (2002)
- "Now" by Def Leppard (2002)
- "Falling for You" by Student Rick (2002)
- "Complicated" by Avril Lavigne (2002)
- "My Friends Over You" by New Found Glory (2002)
- "Attitude" by Alien Ant Farm (2002)
- "Amber" by 311 (2002)
- "First Date" by blink-182 (2002)
- "Another Perfect Day" by American Hi-Fi (2001)
- "The Rock Show" by blink-182 (2001)
- "Lipstick and Bruises" by Lit (2001)
- "You're a God" by Vertical Horizon (2001)
- "A Little Respect" by Wheatus (2001)
- "Breakout" by Foo Fighters (2000)
- "Responsibility" by MxPx (2000)
- "Wasting My Life by The Hippos (2000)

== Films ==
- Thicker Than Water (2000) (directed by Jack Johnson, Chris Malloy and Emmett Malloy)
- Out Cold (2001)
- A Brokedown Melody (2004) (directed by Jack Johnson and Chris Malloy)
- Kokua Festival, Honolulu, Hawaii 2008 (2009) (directed by Emmett Malloy)
- Under Great White Northern Lights (2009) (directed by Emmett Malloy)
- Big Easy Express (2012) (directed by Emmett Malloy)
- The Tribes of Palos Verdes (2017)
- Kneeling At the Anthem D.C. (2018) (directed by Emmett Malloy)

== Brendan Malloy (videography) ==
- "Here We Go Again" by Demi Lovato (2009) (co-director with Tim Wheeler)
- "Paranoid" by Jonas Brothers (2009) (co-director with Tim Wheeler)
- "La La Land" by Demi Lovato (2008) (co-director with Tim Wheeler)
- "Burnin' Up" by Jonas Brothers (2008) (co-director with Tim Wheeler)
