= En Concert (Jack Johnson album) =

Live album by Jack Johnson
- Released: October 27, 2009
- Recorded: Mid-2008
- Genre: Acoustic rock, folk rock
- Length: 76:56
- Label: Brushfire, Universal

Jack Johnson chronology
Sleep Through the Static (2008)	En Concert (2009)	To the Sea (2010)

En Concert is a live album by American singer-songwriter Jack Johnson, released in late 2009. All songs on the album were recorded live during the "Sleep Through the Static World Tour" in 2008 where 100% of the tour profits and profits from this release will be going to fund the Kokua Hawaii Foundation and the Johnson Ohana Charitable Foundation to support environmental art, and music education around the world. It was released as an iTunes LP on the iTunes Store in late 2009.

== Track listing ==
1. "Belle"/"Banana Pancakes" – 6:19
2. "If I Had Eyes" 4:11
3. "Do You Remember"/"Remember" – 3:46
4. "Sleep Through the Static" – 4:19
5. "Flake" – 5:27
6. "Bubble Toes"/"Express Yourself" – 4:18
7. "Wasting Time" – 5:01
8. "What You Thought You Need" – 3:57
9. "Country Road" – 2:58 (Jack Johnson & Paula Fuga)
10. "Staple It Together" – 4:02
11. "Sitting, Waiting, Wishing" – 3:25
12. "Constellations" – 3:31 (Jack Johnson & Eddie Vedder)
13. "The Horizon Has Been Defeated"/"Mother and Child Reunion" – 4:23
14. "Good People" – 3:36"
15. "All at Once" – 3:45
16. "Gone" – 2:08
17. "Home" – 3:17
18. "Times Like These" – 2:20
19. "Angel"/"Better Together" – 6:13
20. "Go On"/"Upside Down" (Palais Omnisports, Bercy, Peris) iTunes Bonus

Disc 2: DVD

1. "Intro" (If I Had Eyes – 11 Seconds – Palais Omnisports, Bercy, Paris)
2. "Sleep Through the Static" (Palais Omnisports, Bercy, Paris)
3. "Belle" (Palais Omnisports, Bercy, Paris)
4. "Banana Pancakes" (Palais Omnisports, Bercy, Paris)
5. "No Other Way" (Olympia Reitanlage, Munich)
6. "Good People" (Olympia Reitanlage, Munich)
7. "Staple It Together" (Olympia Reitanlage, Munich)
8. "Flake" (Zuiderpark, The Hague)
9. "Bubbletoes" (Zuiderpark, The Hague)
10. "Go On" (Kindl-Buhne Wuhlheide, Berlin)
11. "Constellations" (Watergate Bay, Newquay, UK)
12. "Hope" (Hyde Park, London)
13. "Wasting Time" (Hyde Park, London)
14. "Hi Tide, Low Tide" (Hyde Park, London)
15. "If I Had Eyes" (Hyde Park for 3:00 Min then Paris for 1:23)
16. "All at Once" (Palais Omnisports, Bercy, Paris)
17. "Angel/Better Together" (Palais Omnisports, Bercy, Paris)
18. "Monsoon" (Palais Omnisports, Bercy, Paris)
19. "Rainbow/Buddha" (Palais Omnisports, Bercy, Paris)

== Musicians ==
- Jack Johnson – lead vocals, guitar
- Adam Topol – drums, percussion
- Merlo Podlewski – bass guitar
- Zach Gill – piano, accordion, percussion, background vocals

== Charts ==
Chart performance for En Concert
Chart (2009)	Peak position
Australian Albums (ARIA)	21
Austrian Albums (Ö3 Austria)	26
Belgian Albums (Ultratop Flanders)	60
Belgian Albums (Ultratop Wallonia)	69
Canadian Albums (Billboard)	9
Dutch Albums (Album Top 100)	34
French Albums (SNEP)	106
German Albums (Offizielle Top 100)	57
New Zealand Albums (RMNZ)	32
Spanish Albums (PROMUSICAE)	59
Swiss Albums (Schweizer Hitparade)	72
US Billboard 200	11
