= The September Sessions =

- Directed by: Jack Johnson
- Produced by: Kelly Slater; Emmett Malloy
- Starring: Kelly Slater; Shane Dorian; Rob Machado; Ross Williams
- Cinematography: Chris Malloy (art director); Art Brewer (Still Photographer)
- Edited by: Erik Thaler (technical)
- Music by: Jack Johnson (score) distributed through Universal Records; Brushfire Records
- Distributed by: Universal Music and Video Distribution (Umvd); Studio 411
- Release date: December 17, 2002
- Running time: 40 minutes (original 2002); 60 minutes (special edition 2004)
- Language: English

The September Sessions: The Tomorrowland Story Brought To Life In Brilliant 16mm Film is a 2002 documentary surf film directed by singer/songwriter Jack Johnson. Often called September Sessions, it is the second of The Moonshine Conspiracy film series. It was filmed in 16 mm.

Following the release of the 2000 film Thicker Than Water, Kelly Slater asked Jack Johnson to accompany Kelly for a trip to Indonesia. With the cast living on a retired Japanese coastguard cutter, Neptune 1, Jack films Kelly and several other surfers including Rob Machado and Shane Dorian as they surfed flawless waves off the coast of Sumatra in the Mentawais of Indonesia. The film captures Kelly Slater during a major change of his life following his first retirement from the ASP circuit. Kelly had fallen into the trap of endless trade shows, store openings, and poster signings that became his life during his first retirement. By escaping both the trade shows and his former life of ASP competitions, Kelly sought to gain new levels in his spirit as he and his friends pulled into the keyhole at Hollow Trees in September, 1999. On the first morning, they awoke and stared at perfectly flawless waves. During the next several days, when Jack wasn't surfing, Jack captured on film the rebirth of Kelly. Jack wrote several songs along the way including "F-Stop Blues". However, unbeknownst to Jack, this film captures Johnson before his own rise to international stardom both as a filmmaker and as a musician.

The September Sessions was the result of this historically important piece of surfing, filmmaking, and music.

== Synopsis ==
Kelly Slater, Shane Dorian, Rob Machado, and others take a freesurf trip to the coast of Sumatra, where they find themselves surfing beautiful waves, and lose the urgency they have come to live with being professionals.

The film also includes commentary by the surfers, and some fun antics including nosewalks, bodysurfing, river surfing and music.

== Cast ==
In alphabetical order:

- Shane Dorian
- Luke Egan
- Brad Gerlach
- Rob Machado
- Kelly Slater
- Ross Williams

== Soundtrack ==
Released on December 17, 2002, The September Sessions soundtrack, which is scored by Johnson, are 10 tracks by various performers including G. Love & Special Sauce, Ozomatli, Beat Down Sound, Princes of Babylon, Bombay the Hard Way, and Johnson himself. Jack performs his own version of Jimmy Buffett's classic A Pirate Looks at Forty. Recorded before Johnson's first album Brushfire Fairytales, these tracks predate Johnson's rise to worldwide stardom.

=== Track listing ===
1. "Pirate Looks at 40" – 2:24 (Jack Johnson)
2. "What Would You Rather Do" – 2:44 (The September Sessions Band)
3. "Grey's Groove" – 5:19 (DJ Greyboy)
4. "Willow Tree" – 3:27 (G. Love & Special Sauce)
5. "Super Bowl Sundae" – 4:40 (Ozomatli)
6. "Ganges A Go-Go" – 1:58 (Bombay the Hard Way)
7. "Thug Style" – 2:27 (The September Sessions Band)
8. "Meaningless Conversation" – 4:42 (Princes of Babylon)
9. "Piglet's Lament" – 5:06 (Beat Down Sound)
10. "F-Stop Blues" – 3:27 (Jack Johnson)

== Special Edition ==
Released in 2004, The September Sessions Special Edition Set included the soundtrack CD and a bonus DVD. The bonus DVD includes extra lefts, extra rights, The Making of September Sessions, and audio tracks with commentary by Kelly and Jack plus Brad and Rob.

== Awards and honors ==
Jack Johnson received the Adobe Highlight Award for September Sessions [1999] at the 2000 ESPN Film Festival.
