= The Moonshine Conspiracy =

Collective of surfers and artists sharing retro sensibility

The Moonshine Conspiracy is a collective of surfers and artists who share a certain retro sensibility. The Conspiracy was begun in 1998 by Emmett Malloy, his cousins the Malloy brothers (surfers Chris Malloy, Keith, and Dan); and former pro-surfer and musician Jack Johnson in Ventura, California. Moonshine released four films. They made a total of six.

Later, they developed a record label company, The Moonshine Conspiracy Records, to release soundtracks for Woodshed Films (owned by Jack Johnson and others). After releasing Johnson's On and On through Universal Records, the label was renamed as Brushfire Records. It was named in part after Johnson's Enjoy Records album debut.

== Moonshine Festival ==
Held in Laguna Beach, California, the Moonshine Festival was an art, music, and film event related to surfing and named for the Malloy-led Moonshine Conspiracy. Jack Johnson, Will Oldham, the Shins, and others, such as surfer-musician Donavon Frankenreiter performed there.

== Films ==
- Thicker than Water (1999, Jack Johnson)
- The Seedling (1999, Thomas Campbell)
- September Sessions (2000, Jack Johnson)
- Shelter (2001)
- Sprout (2004, Thomas Campbell)
- A Brokedown Melody (2004, Chris Malloy)

== See also ==
- List of record labels
