= I Got You (Jack Johnson song) =

Single by Jack Johnson

from the album From Here to Now to You
- Released: June 10, 2013
- Recorded: 2012
- Studio: Mango Tree Studio
- Genre: Rock; surf rock
- Length: 2:59
- Label: Brushfire, Columbia
- Songwriter(s): Jack Johnson
- Producer(s): Mario Caldato Jr.

Jack Johnson singles chronology
"In the Morning" (2011)	"I Got You" (2013)	"Radiate" (2013)

"I Got You" is a song by American musician Jack Johnson and is the lead single from his 2013 album From Here to Now to You. The song was released on June 10, 2013.

== Release ==
The song was released on June 10, 2013 as a CD single, 7' vinyl, and digital download along with the pre-order of the album.

== Composition ==
The song is mainly about his affection to his wife Kim, and about his love to his kids.

== Music video ==
On June 11, 2013, a colorful lyric video featuring a blue skied background was released. On June 28, the official music video was released on Jack's Vevo account. The video features Jack skateboarding in fields, at the beach, and working in public transit. The video was shot by using an old 16mm camera that was used to shoot surf films. The video debut at number 20 on VH1's top music video list, and has spawned over 27 million views on YouTube.

== Chart performance ==
"I Got You" debuted at number 88 on the Billboard Hot 100 for the chart week ending June 29, 2013, and peaked at number 26 on the Japan Hot 100.

=== Weekly charts ===
Chart (2013–2014)	Peak position
Australia (ARIA)	64
Belgium (Ultratip Bubbling Under Flanders)	9
Belgium (Ultratip Bubbling Under Wallonia)	41
Canada (Canadian Hot 100)	84
Japan (Japan Hot 100)	26
US Billboard Hot 100	88
US Hot Rock & Alternative Songs (Billboard)	11

=== Year-end charts ===
Chart (2013)	Position
US Adult Alternative Songs (Billboard)	17
US Hot Rock Songs (Billboard)	98

== Certifications ==
Certifications for "I Got You"
Region	Certification	Certified units/sales
Brazil (Pro-Música Brasil)	Platinum	60,000^{‡}
Canada (Music Canada)	Platinum	80,000^{‡}
New Zealand (RMNZ)	Gold	15,000^{‡}
^{‡} Sales+streaming figures based on certification alone.
