= Animal Liberation Orchestra =

American rock band

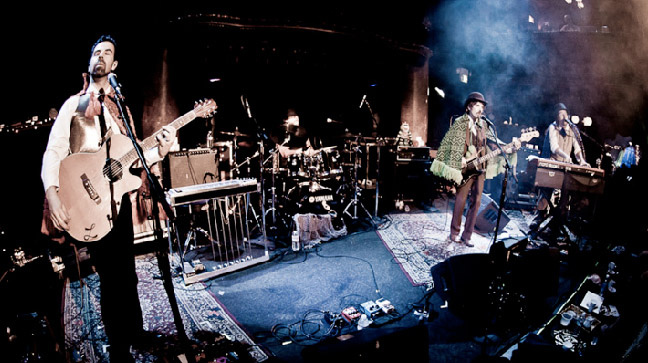
- Animal Liberation Orchestra performing in 2012

Background information
- Also known as: ALO
- Origin: Saratoga, California
- Genres: Rock; Jam band
- Years active: 1989–present
- Labels: Brushfire; Lagmusic
- Members: Zach Gill; Steve Adams; Dan "Lebo" Lebowitz; Ezra Lipp
- Website: www.alomusic.com

Animal Liberation Orchestra (also known casually as ALO) is a California rock band currently signed to Jack Johnson's Brushfire Records label. They have released seven full-length albums for Brushfire, as well as a number of prior independent releases including a film soundtrack. ALO consists of Zach Gill (Keys/Vocals), Steve Adams (Bass/Vocals), Dan "Lebo" Lebowitz (Guitar/Vocals) and Ezra Lipp (Drums/Vocals).

== History ==
=== Forming the band (1989) ===
Childhood friends Lebowitz, Adams and Gill (aka, LAG) formed their first band in junior high school in 1989 with drummer Matt West. Originally called Django, they recorded their first album entitled "Contact" the summer before their senior year in high school, and then moved to Santa Barbara together to attend college. When West returned home after a couple years, music mentor Brogan filled in. In the summer of 1996, the band moved to Augusta, Georgia, to tour the South and meet James Brown, achieving both. Upon their return to Santa Barbara, Brogan decided to move to Seattle, Washington.

A new band name and drummer followed in 1997 – Magnum Family, with Josh Yafa on drums. The band was short-lived but funky, and grew a modest following in Isla Vista, California, where UCSB students mostly lived.

=== The birth of ALO (1998) ===
By 1998, the band evolved into the Animal Liberation Orchestra & The Free Range Horns, a nine-piece ensemble featuring a five-piece horn section and UCSB Jazz Band director Jon Nathan on drums. With their rousing stage shows and their home-made debut album "ALO vs. LAG", the band began drawing enormous attention in the Santa Barbara area. After finishing up their college degrees that summer, Lebowitz, Adams and Gill embarked on a U.S. acoustic tour with hometown friend Rob Binkley on percussion and called it "BLAG Across America". When LAG returned home to Saratoga, California, that fall to return to ALO, they stripped down to a quartet, first pairing up with drummer Shree Shyam Das. Shortening their name to ALO, this new line-up plugged themselves into the SF music scene and recorded continuously, releasing a couple of albums including "One Size Fits All" and "Time Expander", while archiving the rest.

In 2001 Adam and Lebowitz joined the Global Funk Council and ALO went on hiatus, but soon returned in the spring of 2002 playing with a variety of new drummers including Matt Butler and Adam Goodhue. In the fall of 2002, Lebowitz, Adams and Gill reunited with Brogan and ALO was solidified.

=== Current line-up (2002) ===
Between 2002 and 2005, ALO toured incessantly and grew a substantial live following within the western states, particularly in Utah, Colorado, Montana and Oregon. The band also started work on their first album together at Laughing Tiger Studios in San Rafael, California. Just days before their "Fly Between Falls" album release show at The Independent in San Francisco, the band rolled their van driving over an icy pass in Wyoming on their way to Salt Lake City, Utah. With just a few very minor injuries, the band returned home and was greeted with a supportive sold-out release show that marked a notable moment in its history.

ALO's college friendship with singer/songwriter Jack Johnson also rekindled during this time. ALO supported Johnson at The Fillmore in Denver in November 2002. Gill started sitting-in with Johnson and his band more frequently and Johnson also made appearances at ALO shows and would join the band to play each other's songs.

In 2005, Gill began playing more regularly in Johnson's band, adding a new flavor to his live performances. In the summer of 2005, Johnson invited ALO, along with Matt Costa, to support his North American "In Between Dreams" tour. The popularity of Johnson's music and concerts, and his inclusion of ALO in that, started to promote the band to a much wider audience.

During that summer tour, ALO's song "Girl, I Wanna Lay You Down" proved to be a strong live hit with Johnson's fans. Sometimes the band would perform it in their set with Johnson guesting, and other times Johnson would perform it in his set as a duo with Gill on accordion. The song was originally recorded for a silent film soundtrack called "One Size Fits All" back in 1999 and was also re-recorded for the band's independent release of "Fly Between Falls" in 2004. However, the band wanted to record the version that had evolved live so they went back into the studio to do it again, this time with Johnson on additional guitar and vocals.

=== Signing to Brushfire (2006) ===
That fall, Johnson offered to sign the band to his label Brushfire Records, which then re-released Fly Between Falls in 2006 with worldwide distribution. For the re-release, ALO recorded another live favorite, "Walls of Jericho", which was also included in Johnson's DVD release Live at the Greek.

In the spring of 2006, ALO and Matt Costa toured again with Jack Johnson, traveling internationally to England, France, Spain, Italy, Germany, Amsterdam and Japan. ALO also supported Johnson in Brazil. In June, ALO opened for Dave Matthews Band in upstate New York and North Carolina. On October 14, ALO sold out their first headlining concert at the venerated Fillmore Auditorium in San Francisco. Dubbed "The Abnormal Formal," the show encouraged funky flair and included supporting acts Mojow & the Vibration Army, Honeycut and Blue Turtle Seduction. Friends Brett Dennen and Jack Johnson also made guest appearances. ALO spent the rest of the year writing and recording music for their next album. They performed on New Year's Eve at Sea of Dreams in SF, then boarded a cruiseship to participate in the celebrated Jam Cruise from January 2–7, 2007.

On May 1, 2007, ALO released their first album recorded for Brushfire Records, entitled "Roses & Clover". Consistent with their gradual transition from experimental college music to radio-friendly popular music, the band took a much more mainstream approach in the writing and preparation for this release. Recorded mostly live in a barn nestled in the foothills of Santa Barbara, the band took two weeks to work on about 40 songs that were in various stages of completion, many of which had not even been performed live. Eventually, ten songs were chosen for the final cut. These songs were all performed live at their album release show on May 5, 2007, at the Fillmore, which again was sold out.

To promote the new album, the band also reunited with Matt Powers to produce three music videos for the songs "Roses and Clover", "Try" and "Lady Loop". Brushfire Records also produced a video for the opening track "Maria", which picked up notable radio play on stations such as WXPN, WTMD, influential North Carolina Adult Alternative station WVOD and KBCO, among others.

Throughout the summer, ALO played a number of festivals including Wakarusa, Harmony Festival, High Sierra Music Festival, Nedfest and Earthdance, as well as co-billing shows with Brett Dennen and New Monsoon. Tours later in the year included a return to Europe in September, a fall tour that covered the U.S. Northeast, South and Midwest, and the Monterey Music Festival and Las Tortugas Music Festival in California's Yosemite National Park.

ALO returned to Brazil in November for an 11-day tour called "Mostra Festival AlmaSurf" that included G. Love, Donavon Frankenreiter, and Matt Costa as well as a number of photographers, filmmakers and artists such as artist/photographer Jay Alders. The band then returned home to the Bay Area to play a three-night New Year's run at The Independent in San Francisco. 2007 also showed much continued side-project work, Gill with Jack Johnson, and Lebowitz and Adams with Brett Dennen.

2008 marked ALO's second annual Tour d'Amour, their debut at Outside Lands in Golden Gate Park in San Francisco, a return to Las Tortugas Music Festival over Halloween weekend, and a return to the Independent in SF for a two-night New Year's run. Gill released and toured his debut solo album Zach Gill's Stuff for Brushfire Records. Brogan also released and toured his debut solo album "Thunderbird Sun Transformation" produced by Tim Bluhm of The Mother Hips. Lebowitz continued to develop his own band while also teaming up with Bo Carper of New Monsoon. Adams stayed busy with SF indy/jam/rock band Big Light and also filled in for Reed Mathis in Tea Leaf Green as Mathis transitioned in as Tea Leaf's new bass player.

ALO returned to Jam Cruise in January 2009, which traveled to Belize and Mexico. Tour d'Amour III kicked off at the Fox Theater in Oakland supporting Michael Franti & Spearhead during the Fox's opening weekend. ALO flew to Hawaii in April to record their next album at Jack Johnson's solar-powered studio, Mango Tree. The band produced 11 tracks with Jack Johnson and engineer Dave Simon-Baker. In between finishing final recording and mixing, ALO appeared at a handful of festivals including Life is Good Festival in Golden Gate Park, Desert Rocks Music Festival in Moab, Utah, and the Hermosa Beach Pier Summer Series. Side-projects and solo tours also filled in the band members' schedules. ALO returned to the Fox Theater for a New Year's Eve show with Brett Dennen and Sambada.

On February 9, 2010, ALO released their third Brushfire Records album "Man Of The World". The beginning of their release tour coincided with their 4th annual Tour d'Amour. Following their 3rd headlining show at the Fillmore, where they also taped footage for their "Big Appetite" music video with photographer/videographer Jay Blakesberg, ALO continued into the Pacific Northwest supporting New Orleans funk band Galactic including a show at the Olympic Village in Whistler, B.C. ALO flew to Australia in April to play the Byron Bay Blues & Roots Festival. The rest of the spring included national headline touring throughout the East, South and Midwest with supporting artist Chris Velan. ALO and G. Love joined Jack Johnson on his summer U.S. To The Sea tour. In the fall, ALO released their second music video "I Love Music" produced by Matt Powers.

After ringing in 2011 over a two-night run at SOhO in Santa Barbara, ALO flew to Florida to board their third Jam Cruise which traveled to Honduras and Mexico. Tour d'Amour V included Virginia-based singer-songwriter Nathan Moore, which led straight into his 24/7 video-stream tour dubbed the Hippy Fiasco. In April, ALO started recording work on their next album at Mission Bells Studio in San Francisco, then flew to New Orleans for a late night show at Tipitina's during Jazzfest weekend. After many years of playing the High Sierra Music Festival in Quincy, California, ALO had a milestone moment selling out their Vegas-themed Saturday late night show in the Music Hall which included an opening show girls performance and many special guests.

The band went back into Mission Bells in August and October to continue recording. They also toured the Bay Area and Santa Barbara over Halloween weekend which sported a haunted traveling carnival theme and featured live performances of several new songs written for their next album, Sounds Like This, arriving May 8, 2012.

Followed by Tangle of Time in 2015

In 2018 Brogan stepped away from touring to focus on family. He was replaced by Ezra Lipp.

In 2019 and 2020 this version of ALO released Cretures volumes 1 and 2 on Brushfire

Silver Saturdays was released in 2023 and Frames was released in 2025. With subsequent tours.

== Discography ==
=== Albums ===
Year	Title	Label
1998	ALO vs. LAG	Lagmusic Records
1999	One Size Fits All Soundtrack	Lagmusic Records
2002	Time Expander	Lagmusic Records
2005	Fly Between Falls	Lagmusic Records
2006	Fly Between Falls	Brushfire Records
2007	Roses & Clover	Brushfire Records
2010	Man of the World	Brushfire Records
2012	Sounds Like This	Brushfire Records
2015	Tangle of Time	Brushfire Records
2023	Silver Saturdays	Brushfire Records
2025	Frames	Brushfire Records

=== Extended plays ===
- Creatures Vol I: Spark (July 19, 2019)
- Creatures Vol 2: Weave (January 24, 2020)
- Creatures Vol 3 (2020)
- Creatures Vol 4 (TBA)

=== Compilations ===
Year	Title	Label
2006	A Brokedown Melody Soundtrack	Brushfire Records
2006	Brushfire Records Winter 2006 Music Sampler	Brushfire Records
2007	Endless Highway: A Tribute to The Band	429 Records
2007	Thank You. Goodnight. Live Tracks from Bonnaroo & Vegoose	Brushfire Records
2009	This Warm December: A Brushfire Holiday Vol. 1	Brushfire Records
2010	One Percent For The Planet, The Music Vol. 1	One Percent For The Planet
2011	This Warm December: A Brushfire Holiday Vol. 2	Brushfire Records
