= Shot Reverse Shot (song) =

Single by Jack Johnson

from the album From Here to You to Now
- Released: December 23, 2013
- Recorded: 2012
- Studio: Mango Tree Studio
- Genre: Rock
- Length: 3:10
- Label: Brushfire, Island
- Songwriter: Jack Hody Johnson
- Producer: Mario Caldato Jr.

Jack Johnson singles chronology
"Radiate" (2013)	"Shot Reverse Shot" (2013)	"Fragments" (2017)

"Shot Reverse Shot" is a song by American musician Jack Johnson from his 2013 album From Here to Now to You. The song is the third and final single from the album, and was released on December 23, 2013.

== Composition ==
Johnson wrote the song about shot reverse shot, a technique frequently used by film editors to set up a scene where two characters talk to one another in a motion picture. The song also features references of his wife Kim Johnson.

== Release ==
The radio edit of the song was released on December 23, 2013. A one track promotional single for the album was released in the UK.

== Music video ==
The music video for the song was released on December 24, 2013, and spawned over 1 million views on YouTube. The video was shot frame by frame while Johnson was on his From Here to Now to You Tour in Australia and New Zealand.
