= Songs We Sing =

Studio album by Matt Costa
- Released: July 26, 2005; March 28, 2006 (re-release)
- Recorded: The Lodge (Long Beach, CA, United States); Maple Studios (Santa Ana, CA, United States); Grandmaster Recorders Ltd. (Hollywood, CA, United States); Avast! Recording (Seattle, WA, United States)
- Genre: Indie rock
- Length: 37:02; 44:54(re-release)
- Labels: Venerable; Brushfire (re-release)
- Producers: Tom Dumont; Phil Ek

Matt Costa chronology
| The Elasmosaurus EP (2005) | Songs We Sing (2005) | Unfamiliar Faces (2008) |

Professional ratings
Review scores
| Source | Rating |
|---|---|
| Allmusic | 3.5/5 stars |
| Music Box | 3/5 stars |

Songs We Sing is the debut studio album by American singer/songwriter Matt Costa. It was originally released on July 26, 2005, and then re-released with a new track list by Brushfire Records on March 28, 2006.

== 2005 independent release ==
Songs We Sing was originally released independently by Venerable Media in 2005 and offered a slightly different track list than the Brushfire Records version. This version of the album is currently unavailable. For a time, it was available at CD Baby, but they have now permanently sold out. Songs from this release that were not re-released on the Brushfire Records version include: "Desire's Only Fling", "Whiskey & Wine", and "Shimmering Fields".

=== Track listing ===
All songs written by Matt Costa.

| No. | Title | Length |
|---|---|---|
| 1. | "Yellow Taxi" | 3:41 |
| 2. | "Astair" | 2:57 |
| 3. | "Oh Dear" | 2:13 |
| 4. | "Cold December" | 4:19 |
| 5. | "Desire's Only Fling" | 2:54 |
| 6. | "Sweet Rose" | 2:45 |
| 7. | "Songs We Sing" | 3:12 |
| 8. | "Sunshine" | 2:24 |
| 9. | "Whiskey & Wine" | 2:49 |
| 10. | "Shimmering Fields" | 2:19 |
| 11. | "Behind the Moon" | 3:35 |
| 12. | "Wash Away" | 3:54 |

== 2006 Brushfire Records release ==
Songs We Sing was re-released in 2006 by Brushfire Records, owned by fellow musician Jack Johnson and his wife. The album featured new songs and a different tracklist. Songs from this release that were not on the 2005 release include; "These Arms", "I Tried", "Ballad of Miss Kate", and "Sweet Thursday".

Some European releases include "Lullaby" as a bonus track. This song, along with the other four mentioned above, was previously released on The Elasmosaurus EP.

=== Revised track listing ===
All songs written by Matt Costa.

| No. | Title | Length |
|---|---|---|
| 1. | "Cold December" | 4:19 |
| 2. | "Astair" | 2:58 |
| 3. | "Sweet Thursday" | 4:31 |
| 4. | "Sunshine" | 2:36 |
| 5. | "These Arms" | 4:10 |
| 6. | "Ballad of Miss Kate" | 4:30 |
| 7. | "Sweet Rose" | 2:39 |
| 8. | "Songs We Sing" | 3:10 |
| 9. | "Yellow Taxi" | 3:41 |
| 10. | "I Tried" | 2:43 |
| 11. | "Behind the Moon" | 3:35 |
| 12. | "Oh Dear" | 2:12 |
| 13. | "Wash Away" | 3:55 |

European bonus track
| No. | Title | Length |
|---|---|---|
| 14. | "Lullaby" (featuring Jack Johnson) | 2:38 |

iTunes bonus track
| No. | Title | Length |
|---|---|---|
| 14. | "Gloomy" | 1:32 |

== Personnel ==
- Matt Costa – vocals, electric guitar, acoustic guitar, bass, piano

Additional personnel

- Andrew Alekel – engineering, mixing on tracks 3 and 10
- Brent Arnold – cello on track 13
- Robert Carranza – production on "Lullaby", engineering on "Lullaby", mixing on "Lullaby"
- Dave Collins – mastering on all tracks
- Tom Dumont – electric guitar on track 1, bass on track 5, production on all tracks
- Phil Ek – engineering, mixing on tracks 1, 2, 4, 5, 6, 7, 8, 9, 11, 12 and 13
- Jack Johnson – vocals on "Lullaby", guitar on "Lullaby", ukulele on "Lullaby", production on "Lullaby"
- Jen Kozel – violin on track 13
- Ted Matson – piano on tracks 5 and 10, engineering
- Gabrial McNair – harpsichord on track 2
- Bob Thompson – bass on tracks 1 and 3
- Mitchell Townsend – electric guitar on tracks 1, 3, 5 and 6, bass on tracks 6 and 11, lap steel guitar on track 9
- Cameron Webb – engineering
- Adrian Young – drums on track 11
- Adam Zuckert – drums on tracks 1, 3, 5, 6, 7, 8 and 12
