= Fly Between Falls =

Studio album by Animal Liberation Orchestra
- Released: April 18, 2006
- Recorded: Laughing Tiger Studios (San Rafael, CA, United States); Expression Studios (Emeryville, CA, United States)
- Genre: Rock
- Length: 46:01 (United States); 51:30 (UK); 50:31 (JP)
- Label: Brushfire Records
- Producer: Animal Liberation Orchestra; Scott Theakston

Animal Liberation Orchestra chronology
Fly Between Falls (2006)	Roses & Clover (2007)

Fly Between Falls was the first album by Animal Liberation Orchestra to be released on Brushfire Records, although it was not their first record. It was originally released on Lagmusic Records in 2005 but was re-released on Brushfire in 2006. It features Brushfire artist Jack Johnson on the track "Girl I Wanna Lay You Down." New to the re-released version of the album is the track "Walls of Jericho," which has become a crowd favorite.

== Track listing ==
No.	Title	Writer(s)	Length
1.	"Spectrum"	Zach Gill	3:49
2.	"Wasting Time (Isla Vista Song)"	Dave Brogan, Zach Gill, Dan Lebowitz	5:58
3.	"Girl, I Wanna Lay You Down" (featuring Jack Johnson)	Steve Adams, Dave Brogan, Zach Gill, Dan Lebowitz	3:38
4.	"Barbeque"	Zach Gill	4:01
5.	"Walls of Jericho"	Dave Brogan	3:39
6.	"Pobrecito"	Steve Adams, Zach Gill, Dan Lebowitz	4:34
7.	"Shapeshifter"	Zach Gill	6:24
8.	"The Gardener"	Steve Adams	5:33
9.	"Waiting for Jaden"	Steve Adams, Zach Gill, Dan Lebowitz	6:40
10.	"Fly"	Dave Brogan	4:45

Japanese bonus track
No.	Title	Writer(s)	Length
13.	"Possibly Drown"	Steve Adams, Dave Brogan, Zach Gill, Dan Lebowitz	4:30

UK track listing
No.	Title	Writer(s)	Length
1.	"Spectrum"	Zach Gill	3:49
2.	"Wasting Time (Isla Vista Song)"	Dave Brogan, Zach Gill, Dan Lebowitz	5:58
3.	"Girl, I Wanna Lay You Down" (featuring Jack Johnson)	Steve Adams, Dave Brogan, Zach Gill, Dan Lebowitz	3:38
4.	"Barbeque"	Zach Gill	4:01
5.	"Possibly Drown"	Steve Adams, Dave Brogan, Zach Gill, Dan Lebowitz	4:30
6.	"Pobrecito"	Steve Adams, Zach Gill, Dan Lebowitz	4:34
7.	"Shapeshifter"	Zach Gill	6:24
8.	"The Gardener"	Steve Adams	5:33
9.	"Waiting for Jaden"	Steve Adams, Zach Gill, Dan Lebowitz	6:40
10.	"Fly"	Dave Brogan	4:45
11.	"Girl, I Wanna Lay You Down" (Live from the Greek Theatre, Berkeley, CA)	Steve Adams, Zach Gill, Dan Lebowitz	4:38

== Personnel ==
Animal Liberation Orchestra

- Steve Adams – bass, acoustic upright bass, lead vocals on track 8, backing vocals on tracks 1, 4, 5, 6, 7, 9 and "Possibly Drown", pennywhistle on track 2, wood flute on track 2, production
- Dave Brogan – drums, percussion, lead vocals on tracks 2, 5 and 10, backing vocals on "Possibly Drown", quinto on track 1, clavinet on track 2, tambourine on track 6, shakers on track 6, synthesizer on tracks 5 and 8, piano on tracks 9 and 10, guitar on track 5, production
- Zach Gill – accordion on tracks 1, 2 and "Girl, I Wanna Lay You Down (Live from the Greek Theatre)", piano on tracks 5, 7 and 8, rhodes piano on tracks 3, 4, 6, 8, 9 and "Possibly Drown", lead vocals on tracks 1, 2, 3, 4, 6, 7, 9, "Possibly Drown" and "Girl, I Wanna Lay You Down (Live from the Greek Theatre)", backing vocals on tracks 5, 8 and 10, ukulele on tracks 1 and 4, wurlitzer on tracks 2 and 10, jaw harp on track 1, synthesizer on tracks 4, 7 and 9, clavinet on tracks 4 and 7, organ on track 8 and "Possibly Drown", production
- Dan Lebowitz – guitar, lap steel guitar on tracks 2 and 9, backing vocals on tracks 1, 4, 5, 6, 7, 9, "Possibly Drown" and "Girl, I Wanna Lay You Down (Live from the Greek Theatre)", congas on tracks 1, 2 and 6, tumba on track 1, bongos on track 1, production

Additional personnel

- Jack Johnson – vocals on track 3 and "Girl, I Wanna Lay You Down (Live from the Greek Theatre)", guitar on "Girl, I Wanna Lay You Down (Live from the Greek Theatre)"
- Tim Young – guitar on track 10
- Dave Simon-Baker – backing vocals on track 3, engineering on tracks 3 and 4, mixing on tracks 3 and 4
- Scott Theakston – production, engineering, mixing
- Robert Carranza – engineering on "Girl, I Wanna Lay You Down (Live from the Greek Theatre)", mixing on "Girl, I Wanna Lay You Down (Live from the Greek Theatre)"
