= Radiate (Jack Johnson song) =

Single by Jack Johnson

from the album From Here to You to Now
- Released: September 16, 2013
- Recorded: 2012
- Studio: Mango Tree Studio
- Genre: Rock
- Length: 4:15
- Label: Brushfire Records
- Songwriter: Jack Johnson
- Producer: Mario Caldato Jr.

Jack Johnson singles chronology
"I Got You" (2013)	"Radiate" (2013)	"Shot Reverse Shot" (2013)

"Radiate" is a song by American musician Jack Johnson from his 2013 album From Here to Now to You. The song is the second single from the album, and was released on September 16, 2013.

== Composition ==
Radiate was written in 2011 about Johnson's 6-year-old son playing in his backyard world.

== Release ==
The song was released on September 16, 2013, which was a day before the album release. The song was released as a digital download, one track CD, and an exclusive 7" inch vinyl was released on December 23, 2017.

== Music video ==
For the official music video, On August 7, 2013 Jack collaborated with the organization OMG and "The Daniels." The video features many summer campers coming up with ideas to make Jack Johnson's video, and all the ideas are explained. The video was released on October 28, 2013.

== Track listing ==
=== CD Single ===
1. "Radiate" - 4:15
2. "Radiate (Radio Edit)" - 3:00

=== 7" vinyl ===
1. "Radiate" - 4:15
2. "Mudfootball" - 4:55

=== The Switch Remixes ===
1. "Radiate" (Switch remix) - 3:44
2. "Radiate" (Switch Dub remix) - 4:04

== Charts ==
Chart (2013)	Peak Position
Belgium Ultratop Singles Chart	82
US Adult Alternative Songs	15
