= Better Together (Jack Johnson song) =

2006 single by Jack Johnson

Single by Jack Johnson

from the album In Between Dreams
- Released: February 27, 2006
- Recorded: 2004
- Genre: Acoustic rock
- Length: 3:27
- Label: Brushfire, Columbia
- Songwriter: Jack Johnson
- Producer: Mario Caldato Jr.

Jack Johnson singles chronology
"Breakdown" (2005)	"Better Together" (2006)	"Upside Down" (2006)

"Better Together" is a song written and performed by American singer-songwriter Jack Johnson. The first track on Johnson's third studio album, In Between Dreams (2005), it was released as a single in February 2006. The song charted at number 24 on the UK Singles Chart. In the United States, a live version from the En Concert live album was released as a single in 2009, peaking at number 23 on the Mediabase Triple A chart. It was also included in a Cuban remix of the song which was included in Rhythms del Mundo. A rerecording of the song was created for a Hawaiian slack-key compilation.

The song samples from the Hoagy Carmichael song "Heart and Soul".

The song was chosen by Rob Brydon as one of his Desert Island Discs. and sung by him while as his portrayal of Bryn in Gavin & Stacey in the second season's finale.

== Charts ==
Chart	Peak position
Ireland (IRMA)	72
UK Singles Chart	24
U.S. Mediabase Triple A (2009 Version)	22

== Certifications ==
Region	Certification	Certified units/sales
Australia (ARIA)	6× Platinum	420,000^{‡}
Brazil (Pro-Música Brasil)	Platinum	60,000^{‡}
Canada (Music Canada)	4× Platinum	320,000^{‡}
Denmark (IFPI Danmark)	Platinum	90,000^{‡}
Germany (BVMI)	Gold	150,000^{‡}
Italy (FIMI)	Gold	35,000^{‡}
New Zealand (RMNZ)	4× Platinum	120,000^{‡}
Spain (PROMUSICAE)	Platinum	60,000^{‡}
United Kingdom (BPI)	2× Platinum	1,200,000^{‡}
United States (RIAA)	Gold	500,000^{*}
^{*} Sales figures based on certification alone.^{‡} Sales+streaming figures based on certification alone.
