= The Horizon Has Been Defeated =

2003 single by Jack Johnson

Single by Jack Johnson

from the album On and On
- Released: March 10, 2003
- Genre: Acoustic rock; folk rock; reggae
- Length: 2:33
- Label: The Moonshine Conspiracy
- Songwriter: Jack Johnson
- Producers: Mario Caldato, Jr.

Jack Johnson singles chronology
"Flake" (2002)	"The Horizon Has Been Defeated" (2003)	"Taylor" (2003)

"The Horizon Has Been Defeated" is a song written and performed by American singer-songwriter Jack Johnson. It was released as the second single from his album, On and On (2003), on March 10, 2003. The single reached No. 31 on the US Billboard Modern Rock Tracks chart and No. 43 in New Zealand.

== Charts ==
=== Weekly charts ===
Chart (2003)	Peak position
Australia (ARIA)	51
New Zealand (Recorded Music NZ)	43
US Adult Alternative Airplay (Billboard)	1
US Adult Pop Airplay (Billboard)	28
US Alternative Airplay (Billboard)	31

=== Year-end charts ===
Chart (2003)	Position
US Triple-A (Billboard)	3

== Release history ==
Region	Date	Format(s)	Label(s)	Ref.
United States	March 10, 2003	Triple A; alternative radio	The Moonshine Conspiracy	
United States	April 7, 2003	Hot adult contemporary radio	The Moonshine Conspiracy	
Australia	April 7, 2003	CD	Modular	
