= Everyday behavior =

Everyday behavior can refer to:

- Everyday life
- Everyday Behavior, 2004 music album by Mêlée
