= Roses & Clover =

Studio album by Animal Liberation Orchestra
- Released: May 1, 2007
- Recorded: The Barn (Santa Barbara, CA, United States); Studio Noche (San Rafael, CA, United States); Chez Pedro (San Francisco, CA, United States); Maple Leaf Studio (Seattle, WA, United States)
- Genre: Rock
- Length: 45:58 (United States); 50:33 (UK); 50:18 (iTunes)
- Label: Brushfire Records
- Producer: Animal Liberation Orchestra; Robert Carranza; Dave Simon-Baker

Animal Liberation Orchestra chronology
Fly Between Falls (2006)	Roses & Clover (2007)	Man of the World (2010)

Roses & Clover is the second Brushfire Records release by Animal Liberation Orchestra.

== Track listing ==
No.	Title	Writer(s)	Length
1.	"Maria"	Zach Gill	3:53
2.	"Empty Vessel (A Pledge of No Allegiance)"	Dave Brogan	4:01
3.	"Try"	Dan Lebowitz	3:25
4.	"Roses and Clover"	Steve Adams, Dave Brogan, Zach Gill, Dan Lebowitz	4:57
5.	"Monday"	Zach Gill	4:29
6.	"Shine"	Steve Adams, Zach Gill, Dan Lebowitz	5:56
7.	"Plastic Bubble"	Steve Adams, Dave Brogan, Zach Gill, Dan Lebowitz	3:35
8.	"All Alone"	Zach Gill	3:48
9.	"Lady Loop"	Dave Brogan, Paul Moore	4:19
10.	"Water Song"	Zach Gill	7:35

Japanese bonus track
No.	Title	Length
13.	"Haji Memashite"

UK bonus track
No.	Title	Writer(s)	Length
13.	"Just Like Heaven"	Dave Brogan	4:35

iTunes bonus track
No.	Title	Length
13.	"Country Camper"	4:20

== Personnel ==
Animal Liberation Orchestra

- Steve Adams – bass, vocals, production
- Dave Brogan – drums, percussion, piano, wurlitzer, synthesizer, vocals, production
- Zach Gill – piano, rhodes piano, synthesizer, guitar on track 5, ukulele, vocals, vox mutator, production
- Dan Lebowitz – guitar, lap steel guitar, vocals, production

Additional Personnel

- Evan Francis – alto saxophone on track 3
- Adam Theis – trombone on track 3
- Jenna Lebowitz – vocals on tracks 3 and 9
- Amy Windecker – vocals on track 9
- Muneca Osorio – vocals on track 9
- Dave Simon-Baker – production, recording
- Robert Carranza – production, mixing, mastering

== Chart performance ==
Chart (2007)	Peak position
US Top Heatseekers (Billboard)	23
