= Mobile Chateau =

Studio album by Matt Costa
- Released: September 21, 2010
- Studio: Angelic Pheasant Studios (Santa Ana, California)
- Genre: Indie rock
- Label: Brushfire
- Producer: Matt Costa

Matt Costa chronology
Unfamiliar Faces (2008)	Mobile Chateau (2010)	Matt Costa (2013)

Professional ratings
Review scores
Source	Rating
AllMusic	4/5 stars

Mobile Chateau is the third full-length album by singer-songwriter Matt Costa. It was released through Brushfire Records on September 21, 2010. The album sees Costa taking on the role of Record producer for the first time.

In his positive, four-stars review on Allmusic, Matt Collar writes that Costa's Anglophile obsessions are "amplified here with a sound that brings to mind the best of the mid-'60s Invasion", mentioning as influences British mod rock, the Zombies and the Byrds.

== Track listing ==
Mobile Chateau track listing
No.	Title	Writer(s)	Length
1.	"The Season"	Matt Costa	3:08
2.	"Johnny's Love of Majik"	Costa	2:53
3.	"Drive"	Costa, Bob Lind	2:27
4.	"Mobile Chateau"	Costa	2:17
5.	"Can You Tell Me"	Costa	2:46
6.	"Idol"	Costa, Robb Rowe	3:19
7.	"Witchcraft"	Costa	3:45
8.	"Painted Face"	Costa	3:15
9.	"Bleeding Hearts"	Costa	3:42
10.	"Secret"	Costa	3:02
11.	"Strings of Change"	Costa, Danny Garcia	2:15
12.	"Next Time"	Costa	3:01

iTunes bonus track
No.	Title	Writer(s)	Length
13.	"Mayor Harrison"	Costa	2:47

== Personnel ==
- Matt Costa – vocals on all tracks, electric guitar on tracks 2, 6, 7 and 10, acoustic guitar on tracks 4, 5, 9, 11 and 12, classical guitar on track 8, lap steel on track 4, twelve-string guitar on tracks 5, 8 and 11, electric twelve-string guitar on track 1, bass on tracks 4, 8 and 10, piano on tracks 1, 3, 4, 5, 6 and 10, organ on tracks 1 and 11, harmonica on track 1, trumpet on tracks 3, 9 and 11, harpsichord on track 8, drums on tracks 8 and 10, autoharp on tracks 1 and 8, lute on track 8, percussion on tracks 4, 7, 8, 9, 10, 11 and 12, Record producer on all tracks, engineering on all tracks

Additional personnel

- Matt Aveiro – drums on track 2, percussion on track 2
- Kenny Bender – electric guitar on tracks 6 and 9, bass on tracks 7 and 12, percussion on track 9, backing vocals on tracks 2
- Casey Costa – backing vocals on tracks 8 and 11
- Phil Ek – mixing on all tracks
- Danny Garcia – organ on tracks 6 and 7, piano on track 9, electric guitar on tracks 2, 11 and 12, bass on tracks 1, 2 and 11, electric twelve-string guitar on track 5, percussion on track 9
- Corey Gash – percussion on track 5
- Gene Grimaldi – mastering on all tracks
- Jason Kardong – pedal steel guitar on tracks 2
- Robb Rowe – electric guitar on tracks 7 and 12, bass on tracks 3, 5, 6 and 9, percussionon track 9, vocals on track 6, backing vocals on tracks 2, 6, 7, 12
- Jona Wilder – drums on tracks 1, 3, 5, 6, 7, 9 and 12 percussion on tracks 5, 6 and 9 congas on track 12
