= Can't Hold On =

Can't Hold On or I Can't Hold On may refer to:

- "Can't Hold On", a song by Cheap Trick recorded for At Budokan in 1978 and first released on Found All the Parts in 1980
- "I Can't Hold On", a song by Squeeze from the 1982 album Sweets from a Stranger
- "Can't Hold On", a song by Mêlée from the 2007 album Devils & Angels
- "Can't Hold On", a 2010 single by Shiloh
