= Good People (song) =

2005 single by Jack Johnson

Single by Jack Johnson

from the album In Between Dreams
- B-side: "No Other Way" (acoustic); "Butter Nut"
- Released: May 9, 2005
- Genre: Folk; pop; rock
- Length: 3:28
- Label: Brushfire
- Songwriter: Jack Johnson
- Producer: Mario Caldato Jr.

Jack Johnson singles chronology
| "Sitting, Waiting, Wishing" (2005) | "Good People" (2005) | "Breakdown" (2005) |

"Good People" is a protest song written and performed by Jack Johnson. It is the fourth track on the album In Between Dreams and was released as a single on May 9, 2005. Though the song has a positive and relaxing sound, it is a critique of contemporary television, especially with regard to frequent violence, and its effect on society. The song is similar to the song "Cookie Jar" from Johnson's previous album On and On, which also draws attention to the issue, but with a more explicit protest and melancholic sound.

"Good People"
Sample of the song - 156KB

== Commercial performance ==
"Good People" peaked at number one on the Billboard Adult Alternative Songs chart in the United States. It also became a minor hit in the United Kingdom, peaking at number 50 on the UK Singles Chart. It additionally reached number 25 in New Zealand and number 92 in the Netherlands. The single was certified gold by the Recording Industry Association of America.

== Track listings ==
Canadian CD single

1. "Good People"
2. "No Other Way" (acoustic version)
3. "Butter Nut"
4. "Good People" (live video from the Kokua Festival)

UK 7-inch single and European CD single

1. "Good People"
2. "No Other Way" (acoustic version)

UK CD single

1. "Good People"
2. "No Other Way" (acoustic version)
3. "Butter Nut"

UK DVD single

1. "Good People" (video)
2. "Butter Nut" (live video from the Kokua Festival)
3. "Making of In Between Dreams" (filmed at The Mango Tree Hawaii, October 2004)

== Charts ==
=== Weekly charts ===
Weekly chart performance for "Good People"
| Chart (2005) | Peak position |
|---|---|
| Netherlands (Single Top 100) | 92 |
| New Zealand (Recorded Music NZ) | 25 |
| Scotland Singles (Official Charts) | 66 |
| UK Singles (Official Charts) | 50 |
| US Adult Alternative Airplay (Billboard) | 1 |
| US Alternative Airplay (Billboard) | 29 |

=== Year-end charts ===
Year-end chart performance for "Good People"
| Chart (2005) | Position |
|---|---|
| US Modern Rock Tracks (Billboard) | 84 |
| US Triple-A (Billboard) | 2 |

== Certifications ==
Certifications and sales for "Good People"
| Region | Certification | Certified units/sales |
|---|---|---|
| Australia (ARIA) | Platinum | 70,000^{‡} |
| Canada (Music Canada) | Platinum | 80,000^{‡} |
| New Zealand (RMNZ) | Platinum | 30,000^{‡} |
| United Kingdom (BPI) | Silver | 200,000^{‡} |
| United States (RIAA) | Gold | 500,000^{*} |
^{*} Sales figures based on certification alone.^{‡} Sales+streaming figures based on certification alone.

== Release history ==
Release dates and formats for "Good People"
| Region | Date | Format(s) | Label(s) | Ref. |
|---|---|---|---|---|
| United States | May 9, 2005 | Triple A radio | Brushfire | |
| United Kingdom | June 13, 2005 | CD | Brushfire | |
| United States | June 27, 2005 | Alternative radio | Brushfire | |
| United States | August 22, 2005 | Hot adult contemporary radio | Brushfire | |
