= Built to Last (Mêlée song) =

2007 single by Mêlée

Single by Mêlée

from the album Devils & Angels
- Released: Jan 16, 2007
- Genre: Pop rock
- Length: 3:42
- Label: Warner Bros.
- Songwriter(s): Chris Cron and Ricky Sans

Mêlée singles chronology
"Can't Hold On" (2006)	"Built to Last" (2007)	"New Heart/Sick" (2007)

Music video
- "Built To Last" on YouTube

"Built to Last" is the second single from the band Mêlée's second full-length album, Devils & Angels, released on January 16, 2007.

The music video for the song, directed by The Malloys, features references to romantic moments in various classic films, including Say Anything..., From Here to Eternity, Ghost, Brokeback Mountain and Titanic, among others.

== Charts and certifications ==
=== Weekly charts ===
Chart (2008)	Peak position
Austria (Ö3 Austria Top 40)	45
Belgium (Ultratop 50 Flanders)	30
Netherlands (Dutch Top 40)	7
Netherlands (Single Top 100)	14
Germany (GfK)	40
Switzerland (Schweizer Hitparade)	36
UK Singles (OCC)	57

=== Year-end charts ===
Chart (2008)	Position
Netherlands (Dutch Top 40)	27
Netherlands (Single Top 100)	85
