= Unfamiliar Faces =

Studio album by Matt Costa
- Released: January 22, 2008
- Recorded: Spring 2007
- Genre: Folk
- Label: Brushfire
- Producer: Tom Dumont

Matt Costa chronology
Songs We Sing (2005/2006)	Unfamiliar Faces (2008)	Mobile Chateau (2010)

Professional ratings
Aggregate scores
Source	Rating
Metacritic	59/100
Review scores
Source	Rating
Allmusic	3/5 stars
The Album Project	4/5 stars
Paste Magazine	2/5 stars
Pitchfork Media	(5.4/10)
JustPressPlay	(8.5/10)

Unfamiliar Faces is the second studio album by Matt Costa, released on January 22, 2008. In the spring of 2007, Costa teamed up with long-time friend/producer Tom Dumont (No Doubt guitarist) and recorded twelve songs for the album.

== CD track listing ==
1. "Mr. Pitiful" - 2:56
2. "Lilacs" - 4:15
3. "Never Looking Back" - 4:04
4. "Emergency Call" - 4:59
5. "Vienna" - 4:04
6. "Unfamiliar Faces" - 4:06
7. "Cigarette Eyes" - 3:18
8. "Downfall" - 2:47
9. "Trying to Lose My Mind" - 3:52
10. "Bound" - 5:09
11. "Heart of Stone" - 3:54
12. "Miss Magnolia" - 3:19

European bonus track:

13. "Lovin' (featuring Ane Brun)" - 1:52

== Double vinyl LP track listing ==
On February 5, Brushfire Records released the double vinyl version of Unfamiliar Faces, pressed at Nashville's historic United Record Pressing.

Side A:

1. "Mr. Pitiful"
2. "Lilacs"
3. "Never Looking Back"
4. "Emergency Call"

Side B:

1. "Vienna"
2. "Unfamiliar Faces"
3. "Cigarette Eyes"
4. "Downfall"

Side C:

1. "Trying To Lose My Mind"
2. "Bound"
3. "Heart Of Stone"
4. "Miss Magnolia"

Side D (etched vinyl):

== Sales and chart performance ==
Unfamiliar Faces debuted at number 59 on the U.S. Billboard 200 chart, selling about 11,000 copies in its first week. The album received mixed reviews, gaining a score of 59 on metacritic.com and 30 from the Observer music monthly.

== Notes ==
- "Mr. Pitiful" was the first single to be released from this album on October 7, 2007.
- "Mr. Pitiful" was released as a free "Single of the Week" on the iTunes Music Store in Canada and Australia.
- "Mr. Pitiful" is used in commercials for the iPhone 3GS.
- "Mr. Pitiful" is featured in the movie and also appears on the soundtrack for the film, I Love You, Man.
