= The Road I'm On =

2003 single by 3 Doors Down

Single by 3 Doors Down

from the album Away from the Sun
- Released: March 17, 2003
- Length: 3:59
- Label: Republic
- Songwriters: Brad Arnold; Todd Harrell; Chris Henderson; Matt Roberts
- Producer: Rick Parashar

3 Doors Down singles chronology
"When I'm Gone" (2002)	"The Road I'm On" (2003)	"Here Without You" (2003)

Music video
- "The Road I'm On" on YouTube

"The Road I'm On" is a song by the American rock band 3 Doors Down. It was released on March 17, 2003, as the second single from their second studio album, Away from the Sun (2002). The song reached number eight on the US Billboard Mainstream Rock Tracks chart and number 24 on the Billboard Modern Rock Tracks chart. It was the only single from Away from the Sun to not be included on the band's compilation album The Greatest Hits (2012).

== Music video ==
The music video for "The Road I'm On" was directed by the Malloys and shows 3 Doors Down performing at night on a checker-flag pattern stage. NASCAR drivers Dale Earnhardt Jr. and Tony Stewart are shown racing through the streets in custom Chevrolet Tahoes. Both drivers eventually end up on a local short track where a race is underway. The scorekeeping girl begins to name them on the chart. The two eventually bust out of the track and go back onto the streets.

== Charts ==
=== Weekly charts ===
Weekly chart performance for "The Road I'm On"
Chart (2003)	Peak position
US Alternative Airplay (Billboard)	24
US Mainstream Rock (Billboard)	8

=== Year-end charts ===
Year-end chart performance for "The Road I'm On"
Chart (2003)	Position
US Mainstream Rock Tracks (Billboard)	33
US Modern Rock Tracks (Billboard)	84
