= Breakdown (Jack Johnson song) =

Single by Jack Johnson

from the album In Between Dreams
- Released: September 2005
- Genre: Pop rock, reggae fusion, Jawaiian
- Length: 3:33
- Label: Brushfire, Columbia
- Songwriter(s): Jack Johnson, Dan Nakamura & Paul Huston
- Producer(s): Mario Caldato Jr.

Jack Johnson singles chronology
"Good People" (2005)	"Breakdown" (2005)	"Better Together" (2006)

Audio sample
- file; help

"Breakdown" is a song written by Jack Johnson, Dan Nakamura & Paul Huston and sung by Jack Johnson. It is the eleventh track on his third album In Between Dreams which was released in February 2005. It was released as a single in September 2005. The video features Jack Johnson surfing in Pichilemu, Chile. The single peaked at #73 in the United Kingdom.

The song was originally featured on the A Brokedown Melody soundtrack. Johnson confessed it was written in a train between Paris and Hossegor, a famous surf spot in France.

A remix of the song was produced by the hip-hop duo Handsome Boy Modeling School (Nakamura & Huston). It is a more upbeat version of the original song, and was featured on their 2004 album, White People.

== Charts ==
Chart	Peak position
UK Singles Chart	73
U.S. Billboard Modern Rock Tracks	40

== Certifications ==
Certifications for "Breakdown"
Region	Certification	Certified units/sales
Australia (ARIA)	Platinum	70,000^{‡}
Canada (Music Canada)	Gold	40,000^{‡}
New Zealand (RMNZ)	Gold	15,000^{‡}
^{‡} Sales+streaming figures based on certification alone.

== Other appearances ==
- The Acoustic Album (2006, Virgin)
