= In Between Dreams =

Studio album by Jack Johnson
- Released: March 1, 2005
- Recorded: October 2004
- Studios: The Mango Tree, Hawaii
- Genres: Folk rock, acoustic rock
- Length: 41:34
- Labels: Brushfire, Universal Records
- Producer: Mario Caldato, Jr.

Jack Johnson chronology
| On and On (2003) | In Between Dreams (2005) | Sing-A-Longs and Lullabies for the Film Curious George (2006) |

Professional ratings
Review scores
| Source | Rating |
|---|---|
| AllMusic | 3.5/5 stars |
| Blender | 2/5 stars |
| Entertainment Weekly | B |
| Mojo | 3/5 stars |
| The New York Times | (mixed) |
| PopMatters | 6/10 |
| Q | 3/5 stars |
| Rolling Stone | 2.5/5 stars |
| Spin | D+ |
| The Village Voice | (favorable) |

In Between Dreams is the third studio album by American singer-songwriter Jack Johnson, released by Brushfire Records in the United States on March 1, 2005. In Between Dreams received generally mixed reviews from music critics; however, it achieved considerable commercial success.

== Album cover ==
The album cover depicts a mango tree, referring to the Mango Tree, the studio where In Between Dreams was recorded. There is also a reference to the mango tree in "Better Together".

== Critical reception ==
At Metacritic, which assigns a normalized rating out of 100 to reviews from mainstream publications, the album received an average score of 58, based on 15 reviews. MacKenzie Wilson of AllMusic describes Johnson as "stick[ing] with what he does best" on the album; this has led some critics to characterize the album as feeling "safe" or unambitious. However, Barry Walters of Rolling Stone argues that Johnson explored new content with more politically minded tracks like "Crying Shame" and "Staple It Together". Most critics have described Johnson's delivery as laid-back or mellow; some tracks were also characterized as employing a "light reggae lilt", a stylistic choice which was generally criticized. The overall mood of the album has been described as "upbeat" and "uplifting".

== Track listing ==
All lyrics are written by Jack Johnson; all music is composed by Johnson, except where noted.

| No. | Title | Length |
|---|---|---|
| 1. | "Better Together" | 3:27 |
| 2. | "Never Know" | 3:32 |
| 3. | "Banana Pancakes" | 3:12 |
| 4. | "Good People" | 3:28 |
| 5. | "No Other Way" | 3:09 |
| 6. | "Sitting, Waiting, Wishing" | 3:03 |
| 7. | "Staple It Together" (Jack Johnson, Merlo Podlewski) | 3:16 |
| 8. | "Situations" | 1:17 |
| 9. | "Crying Shame" (Jack Johnson, Adam Topol) | 3:06 |
| 10. | "If I Could" | 2:25 |
| 11. | "Breakdown" (Jack Johnson, Dan Nakamura & Paul Huston) | 3:32 |
| 12. | "Belle" | 1:43 |
| 13. | "Do You Remember" | 2:24 |
| 14. | "Constellations" | 3:21 |

iTunes bonus track
| No. | Title | Length |
|---|---|---|
| 15. | "Constellations" (Demo from the Mango Tree) | 3:32 |

UK bonus track
| No. | Title | Length |
|---|---|---|
| 15. | "Mudfootball" (Live) | 4:24 |

== Personnel ==
Musicians

- Jack Johnson – vocals and guitars
- Sam Lapointe – lead guitar
- Simon Tessier – bassoon
- Zach Gill – piano on "Good People" and "Sitting, Waiting, Wishing", accordion on "Belle", melodica on "If I Could"
- Adam Topol – drums and percussion
- Merlo Podlewski – bass guitar
- Johnald Hernandez – backup vocals

Production

- Mario Caldato, Jr. – producer, engineer
- Zachary Von Wilkenstein – sound producer, backup vocals
- Robert Carranza – engineering
- Thomas Campbell – photography
- Dave Homcy – photographer

== Charts ==
=== Weekly charts ===
| Chart (2005–2009) | Peak position |
|---|---|
| Australian Albums (ARIA) | 1 |
| Austrian Albums (Ö3 Austria) | 13 |
| Belgian Albums (Ultratop Flanders) | 54 |
| Belgian Albums (Ultratop Wallonia) | 54 |
| Canadian Albums (Billboard) | 3 |
| Danish Albums (Hitlisten) | 14 |
| Dutch Albums (Album Top 100) | 7 |
| French Albums (SNEP) | 46 |
| German Albums (Offizielle Top 100) | 7 |
| Irish Albums (IRMA) | 4 |
| New Zealand Albums (RMNZ) | 1 |
| Norwegian Albums (VG-lista) | 26 |
| Portuguese Albums (AFP) | 15 |
| Scottish Albums (Official Charts) | 4 |
| Spanish Albums (Promusicae) | 88 |
| Swiss Albums (Schweizer Hitparade) | 8 |
| UK Albums (Official Charts) | 1 |
| US Billboard 200 | 2 |

=== Year-end charts ===
| Chart (2005) | Position |
|---|---|
| Australian Albums (ARIA) | 7 |
| Austrian Albums (Ö3 Austria) | 52 |
| Dutch Albums (Album Top 100) | 23 |
| French Albums (SNEP) | 137 |
| German Albums (Offizielle Top 100) | 32 |
| Swiss Albums (Schweizer Hitparade) | 17 |
| UK Albums (OCC) | 30 |
| US Billboard 200 | 29 |
| Worldwide Albums (IFPI) | 17 |

| Chart (2006) | Position |
|---|---|
| Dutch Albums (Album Top 100) | 81 |
| French Albums (SNEP) | 186 |
| German Albums (Offizielle Top 100) | 91 |
| UK Albums (OCC) | 11 |
| US Billboard 200 | 72 |

=== Decade-end charts ===
| Chart (2000–2009) | Position |
|---|---|
| UK Albums (OCC) | 66 |

== Certifications ==
| Region | Certification | Certified units/sales |
|---|---|---|
| Australia (ARIA) | 5× Platinum | 350,000^{‡} |
| Austria (IFPI Austria) | Gold | 15,000^{*} |
| Brazil (Pro-Música Brasil) | Gold | 50,000^{*} |
| Canada (Music Canada) | 6× Platinum | 600,000^{‡} |
| Denmark (IFPI Danmark) | 4× Platinum | 80,000^{‡} |
| France (SNEP) | Gold | 75,000^{*} |
| Germany (BVMI) | 3× Gold | 300,000^{‡} |
| Ireland (IRMA) | 2× Platinum | 30,000^{^} |
| Japan (RIAJ) | Gold | 100,000^{^} |
| Netherlands (NVPI) | Gold | 40,000^{^} |
| New Zealand (RMNZ) | 7× Platinum | 105,000^{‡} |
| Portugal (AFP) | Gold | 20,000^{^} |
| Switzerland (IFPI Switzerland) | Gold | 20,000^{^} |
| United Kingdom (BPI) | 5× Platinum | 1,500,000^{*} |
| United States (RIAA) | 2× Platinum | 2,000,000^{^} |
Summaries
| Europe (IFPI) | 2× Platinum | 2,000,000^{*} |
^{*} Sales figures based on certification alone.^{^} Shipments figures based on certification alone.^{‡} Sales+streaming figures based on certification alone.

== Sheet music ==
The artist-approved sheet music of this album is available through Cherry Lane Music Company in a "Play It Like It Is" guitar folio.
