= Mêlée (band) =

American band

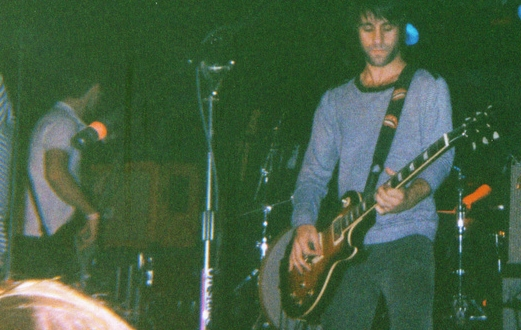
- Melee at The Boardwalk in Orangevale, CA on 3/24/07

Background information
- Origin: Orange County, California, United States
- Genres: Emo; pop punk; indie rock; power pop; alternative rock
- Years active: 2000-2012
- Labels: Warner Bros., Hopeless, Subcity
- Members: Ricky Sans; Chris Cron; Ryan Malloy; Derek Lee Rock
- Past members: Mike Nader; Israel Villanueva; Michael Amico

Mêlée was an American rock band from Orange County in California. Formed in 2000, the band consists of Ricky Sans, Chris Cron, Ryan Malloy and Derek Lee Rock. The group released their debut album Everyday Behavior under Los Angeles–based independent label Subcity Records in 2004. In 2006, they were signed with major record label Warner Bros. Records, and subsequently, in 2007 made their major record label debut Devils & Angels. In 2010, they released their follow-up album on Warner titled The Masquerade, released in Japan and digitally in North America.

== History ==
=== Devils and Angels ===
The first single, "Built to Last" had international radio success, peaking at No. 8 in Austria; No. 4 in Belgium; No. 75 in Czech Republic; No. 58 in Denmark; No. 6 in Finland; No. 2 in Germany; No. 29 in Ireland; No. 2 in Netherlands; No. 13 in Norway; No. 54 in Sweden; No. 7 in Switzerland; No. 16 in UK; No. 1 in Japan; No. 2 in Indonesia; No. 12 in Thailand.

"Imitation", the follow-up single had international radio success as well, reaching No. 21 in Belgium; No. 43 in Switzerland; No. 10 in Singapore; No. 47 in Netherlands. "Can't Hold On", the third single, charted at No. 97 in Netherlands.

"Biggest Mistake" is featured in the trailer for Disney animated movie, Tangled in 2010. "Stand Up" is featured on the soundtrack for the film Sydney White starring Amanda Bynes 2007. Melee appeared in Where Music Meets Film, a one-hour TV special of the three night live music event at the 2008 Sundance Film Festival, that aired on Fuse in 2008.

=== The Masquerade ===
The single "On The Movie Screen" reached No. 3 on The J-Wave Tokio Hot 100 radio chart.

"The Ballad of You and I" was the iTunes Store free single download of the week on October 5, 2010. "The Ballad of You and I" was featured in promotion ads for NBC The Biggest Loser in December 2010.

=== Breakup ===
The group disbanded in 2012.

== Members ==
- Chris Cron (vocals, keyboard, guitar)
- Ricky Sans (guitar, vocals)
- Ryan Malloy (bass, vocals)
- Derek Lee Rock (drums)

Former members

- Mike Nader (drums)
- Israel Villanueva (drums, vocals)
- Michael Amico (drums)
- Lina Simpson (keyboard, vocals)

== After breakup ==
Band member Chris Cron appeared in the auditions of season 11 of the American edition of The Voice singing "Never Tear Us Apart" from INXS. After the performance, he talked about the success of Mêlée internationally, particularly in Japan and his circumstances after the break up of the band.

== Discography ==
=== Studio albums ===
| Year | Album title | Chart Positions | | | | | | |
| Year | Album title | US | BEL (Vl) | GER | JP | NED | SWI | UK |
|---|---|---|---|---|---|---|---|---|
| 2004 | Everyday Behavior: Released: June 29, 2004; Label: Sub City Records, Hopeless Records | – | – | – | – | – | – | – |
| 2007 | Devils & Angels: Released: March 5, 2007; Label: Warner Bros. | – | 86 | 81 | 18 | 26 | 96 | 61 |
| 2010 | The Masquerade: Released: August 18, 2010; Label: Warner Bros. | – | – | – | 35 | – | – | – |

=== Extended Plays (EPs) ===
2000 – An Existential Guide To Love
2001 – Transmission
2002 – Mêlée
2003 – Against the Tide
2007 – New Heart/Sick – These songs were not on Mêlée's albums but rather released via the US iTunes online store.

=== Singles ===
| Title | Year | Peak chart positions | | | | | | | Certifications | Album |
| Title | Year | AUT | BEL (FLA) | BEL (WAL) | GER | NED | SWI | UK | Certifications | Album |
|---|---|---|---|---|---|---|---|---|---|---|
| "Francesca" | 2001 | — | — | — | — | — | — | — | | Transmission |
| "The War" | 2004 | — | — | — | — | — | — | — | | Everyday Behavior |
| "Can't Hold on" | 2007 | — | — | — | — | — (Note: "Can't Hold on" did not enter the Dutch Top 40, but peaked at number 13 on the Tipparade, which acts as an extension to the Ultratop 50.) | — | — | | Devils & Angels |
| "Built to Last" | 2007 | 45 | 30 | — (Note: "Built to Last" did not enter the Ultratop 40, but peaked at number five on the Ultratip chart, which acts as an extension to the Ultratop 40.) | 40 | 7 | 36 | 57 | | Devils & Angels |
| "Frequently Baby (She's a Teenage Maniac)" | 2008 | — | — | — | — | — | — | — | | Devils & Angels |
| "Imitation" | 2008 | — | — (Note: "Imitation" did not enter the Ultratop 50, but peaked at number 13 on the Ultratip chart, which acts as an extension to the Ultratop 50.) | — | — | 24 | — | — | | Devils & Angels |
| "On the Movie Screen" | 2010 | — | — | — | — | — | — | — | | The Masquerade |
| "The Ballad of You And I" | 2010 | — | — | — | — | — | — | — | | The Masquerade |
| "Teo Toriatte" | 2010 | — | — | — | — | — | — | — | | The Masquerade |
"—" denotes items which were not released in that country or failed to chart.

=== Compilations ===
- OCSka.com Compilation CD (2001) Ocska.com
  Featuring "Last Chance"
- Rock Your Socks Off! (2001) Mr. Good Records
  Featuring "Audra"
- The Best of Orange County, Volume 1 (2002) Tankfarm Records
  Featuring "Francesca"
- Because We Care: A Benefit for the Children's Hospital of Orange County (2002) Gluefactory Records
  Featuring "Goodnight For Now"
- Hopelessly Devoted to You Vol. 5 (2004) Hopeless Records/Sub City
  Featuring "New Day" and "Francesca"
- In Honor: A Compilation To Beat Cancer (2004) Vagrant Records
  Featuring "The War" (Piano Version)
- Hopelessly Devoted to You Vol. 6 (2006) Hopeless Records/Sub City
  Featuring "The War" (Alternate Version) and "The War" (Music Video)
- Gift Wrapped - 20 Songs That Keep on Giving! (2009) Warner Bros. Records
  Featuring "(When Is) Hanukkah This Year"
