= Everyday Behavior =

Studio album by Mêlée
- Released: June 29, 2004
- Genre: Rock
- Length: 47:15
- Label: Sub City/Hopeless Records
- Producer: Chris Cron, Rick Sanberg, Howard Benson (reissue)

Mêlée chronology
Against the Tide (EP) (2003)	Everyday Behavior (2004)	Devils & Angels (2007)

Professional ratings
Review scores
Source	Rating
AllMusic	3.5/5 stars

Everyday Behavior is Mêlée's first studio album released on Sub City/Hopeless Records June 29, 2004.

== Track listing ==
All songs written and composed by Cron and Sanberg.

1. "Got It All" - 3:01
2. "New Day" - 3:17
3. "The War" - 3:50
4. "Perfect Mess" - 3:48
5. "Lions Cage" - 3:13
6. "Mestizos Love Song" - 3:36
7. "The Curse" - 3:02
8. "Sleeping Through Autumn" - 5:01
9. "Hey Stranger" - 4:36
10. "Routines" - 3:45
11. "Pennsylvania" + hidden track - 8:15

== Re-Issue Version ==
A re-issued version of Everyday Behavior was released on January 3, 2006. This reissue contains two bonus tracks: "Composure" (formerly a hidden track), and "The War" (Alternate version), produced by Howard Benson.

1. "Got It All" - 3:01
2. "New Day" - 3:17
3. "The War" - 3:50
4. "Perfect Mess" - 3:48
5. "Lions Cage" - 3:13
6. "Mestizos Love Song" - 3:36
7. "The Curse" - 3:02
8. "Sleeping Through Autumn" - 5:01
9. "Hey Stranger" - 4:36
10. "Routines" - 3:45
11. "Pennsylvania" - 4:12
12. "Composure" - 1:55
13. "The War" (Alternate Version) Produced by Howard Benson - 3:58
