= Devils & Angels (album) =

Studio album by Mêlée
- Released: March 5, 2007
- Genre: Pop rock
- Length: 45:20 (plus bonus track)
- Label: Warner Bros.
- Producer: Howard Benson

Mêlée chronology
Everyday Behavior (2004)	Devils & Angels (2007)	The Masquerade (2010)

Alternative cover
- alternative cover

Professional ratings
Review scores
Source	Rating
Absolutepunk.net	(79%)
Allmusic	4.5/5 stars

Devils & Angels is the second studio album by the pop rock band Mêlée. It was released in 2007 through Warner Bros., the group's first release for the record company. The album was produced by Howard Benson and mixed by Tim Palmer at Paramount Studios.

== Track listing ==
All songs were written and composed by Chris Cron and Ricky Sans, except where noted.

1. "Built to Last" - 3:41
2. "Rhythm Of Rain" - 3:41
3. "Frequently Baby (She's a Teenage Maniac)" - 2:51
4. "For a Lifetime" - 3:41
5. "Drive Away" - 3:20
6. "Can't Hold On" - 4:39
7. "Imitation" - 3:33
8. "Love Carries On" - 3:12
9. "She's Gonna Find Me Here" - 3:38
10. "Biggest Mistake" - 2:41
11. "You Got" - 3:08
12. "Stand Up" - 4:11
13. "You Make My Dreams" (Hall & Oates cover) - 3:02
14. "New Heart" (Japanese bonus track) - 2:46
15. "Sick" (Japanese bonus track) - 2:59

== Personnel ==
- Craig Aaronson – A&R
- Jeremy Barnett – vocals (background)
- Howard Benson – keyboards, programming, producer
- Lenny Castro – percussion
- Chris Cron – guitar, piano, arranger, vocals
- Karen Cron – vocals (background)
- Paul DeCarli – digital editing
- Brian "Big Bass" Gardener – mastering
- Hatsukazu "Hatch" Inagaki – assistant engineer
- Lina Kumon – vocals (background)
- Frank Maddocks – design, creative director
- Ryan Malloy – bass, arranger, vocals
- Mike Nader – arranger, drums, vocals
- Jon Nicholson – drum technician
- Mark O'Donoughue – Mixing
- Holly Palmer – vocals (background)
- Tim Palmer – mixing
- Cindi Peters – mixing coordinator
- Mike Plotnikoff – engineer
- Ricky Sans – guitar, arranger, vocals
- Derrick Santini – photography
- Adam Schlesinger – arranger, pre-production
- Jamie Seyberth – assistant engineer, mixing assistant
- Marc VanGool – guitar technician
- Phil X – guitar

== Chart positions ==
Chart	Peak position
Japan (Oricon Chart)	18
Netherlands (Megacharts)	26
Switzerland (Swiss Hitparade)	96
Taiwan (Five Music International Chart)	4
Taiwan (G-Music International Chart)	7
United Kingdom (UK Albums Chart)	61

== Release history ==
Region	Date
United States	March 5, 2007
Taiwan	August 7, 2007
Japan	August 22, 2007
United Kingdom	July 28, 2008
