= Timmy Curran =

American musician and surfer

Tim Curran (born August 14, 1977) is a musician and retired professional surfer. During his successful surfing career, he was one of the best surfers on the World Championship Tour, and was consistently in contention for the world championship. Despite his success and popularity, he remained one of the most affable and well-regarded surfers on the tour, a trait he attributed to his "Christian faith and belief in God".

Curran was raised and still resides near Oxnard, California. He was born in the San Fernando Valley, but spent some of his childhood in the southern Riverside County city of Temecula. Temecula is roughly an hour from the ocean, so at age 5 his father started driving him to the beach every weekend and taught him to surf. He obtained his first sponsorship at age eleven from McCrystal Surfboards and was competing as a professional surfer by age sixteen.

He is famous for completing a full rotation, upside-down flip in two-foot surf at Rocky Point in Hawaii during the winter of 2005. This popular aerial achievement has become known worldwide as simply "The Flip".

Curran is also featured on Eisley's Final Noise E.P., released in 2006.

Curran has published three albums and one EP so far: Citsusa E.P. (2004), and the full album Word of Mouth (2007). The album was re-released in 2008 when Curran signed with Adeline Records, his new recording label, and two music videos were shot for the songs "Save" and "Blue Eyes". The song "Daylights Comin'" was featured in the second episode of the 2011 TV series Charlie's Angels. His second album, Verses, was released on March 9, 2010, and his latest album "Options" was released on May 31, 2011.
