= Matt Butler =

American singer

Matt Butler is an American singer and songwriter from New York. His EP and one-man show Reckless Son are based partly on his own life, and partly on the experiences incarcerated people shared with him while playing concerts at prisons and jails.

== Biography ==
Butler released a number of songs starting in 2015. He played his first show for an incarcerated audience at the Albany County Correctional facility. Besides performing for inmates, he also turns their stories into song, for the 2022 project Reckless Son, a one-man show. Those shows are unpaid, but are often played in towns where he also does paid shows, and then plays at prisons in the daytime. Butler described the project as a "a coming of age story, a hero’s journey", based on a time in his life, in his twenties, when, as he said, "I felt like I had failed everything I’d ever attempted, including making my way as a musician". It contains "monologues and music inspired by his real-life experiences performing in prisons across the country". An accompanying EP, also called Reckless Son, was released on January 27, 2023, after two songs from the EP, "Time To Be A Man" and Good Friday", were released in 2022. The EP received a positive review from Andrew Gulden at Americana Highways, who said the songs were "cautionary tales, yes, but also an exercise in empathy toward the folks who find themselves on the wrong side of the iron bars." Melissa Clarke, also in Americana Highways, praised his "gritty, powerful voice".

Butler recorded a video for his song "Just One" with Greg Williams and Jeff Reilly, both filmmakers, for their documentary Generation Found, about a community in Houston, Texas, that attempts to counter addiction among young people. The video premiered on December 7, 2016, and contains footage from the documentary; Generation Found premiered on December 14 at the theatre of New York's School of Visual Arts.

== Discography ==
- Reckless Son, Pt. 1
  - Matt Butler: vocals, guitars
  - Doug Schadt: keyboards, organ, bass; mixing, engineering
  - Joe Lambert: mastering
