= Thicker than Water (2000 film) =

Thicker Than Water
- DVD cover
- Directed by: Jack Johnson; Chris Malloy; Emmett Malloy
- Starring: Raimana Boucher; Saxon Boucher; Timmy Curran; Shane Dorian; Brad Gerlach
- Release date: May 12, 2000
- Running time: 45 minutes
- Country: United States
- Language: English

Thicker Than Water is a 2000 documentary surf film directed by singer/songwriter Jack Johnson and his film school friend Chris Malloy. It shows surfing footage from different locations like Australia, Indonesia, Hawaii, India, and Ireland in combination with a wide range of styles of guitar music. Surfers in the film include Kelly Slater and Shane Dorian.

== Cast ==
In alphabetical order:

- Raimana Boucher
- Saxon Boucher
- Timmy Curran
- Shane Dorian
- Brad Gerlach
- Hans Hagen
- Conan Hayes
- Jack Johnson
- Noah Johnson
- Tamayo Perry
- Taylor Knox
- Rob Machado
- Chris Malloy
- Dan Malloy
- Emmett Malloy
- Keith Malloy
- Kelly Slater
- Benji Weatherly

== Soundtrack ==
Released on November 25, 2003, the soundtrack to Thicker Than Water, which is scored by Johnson, collects 14 tracks by the likes of G. Love & Special Sauce, The Meters, Finley Quaye, and Johnson himself.

=== Track listing ===
1. "Moonshine" – 2:00 (Jack Johnson)
2. "Rainbow" – 3:23 (G. Love & Special Sauce, Jack Johnson)
3. "Even After All" – 3:55 (Finley Quaye)
4. "Hobo Blues" – 2:44 (G. Love)
5. "Relate to Me" – 1:34 (The Voyces)
6. "The Cove" – 1:52 (Jack Johnson)
7. "Holes to Heaven" – 2:49 (Jack Johnson)
8. "Dark Water & Stars" – 4:59 (Natural Calamity)
9. "My Guru" – 4:10 (Kalyanji–Anandji)
10. "Honor and Harmony" – 3:36 (G. Love and Special Sauce)
11. "Liver Splash" – 2:38 (The Meters)
12. "Underwater Love" – 5:58 (Smoke City)
13. "Thicker than Water" – 3:25 (Todd Hannigan)
14. "Witchi Tai To" – 2:43 (Harpers Bizarre)

== Awards and honors ==
Thicker than Water received Surfer magazine's 2000 Video of the Year Award.

== Certifications ==
| Region | Certification | Certified units/sales |
|---|---|---|
| Australia (ARIA) | Gold | 7,500^{^} |
^{^} Shipments figures based on certification alone.
