= Taylor (song) =

2003 single by Jack Johnson

Single by Jack Johnson

from the album On and On
- B-side: "Gone" (live); "Girl I Want to Lay You Down" (live); "Mudfootball" (live)
- Released: November 3, 2003
- Genre: Pop rock
- Length: 3:59
- Label: Brushfire
- Songwriter: Jack Johnson
- Producer: Mario Caldato Jr.

Jack Johnson singles chronology
"The Horizon Has Been Defeated" (2003)	"Taylor" (2003)	"Sitting, Waiting, Wishing" (2005)

"Taylor" is a song by American singer-songwriter Jack Johnson. It was the third single released from his second studio album, On and On (2003), on November 3, 2003. Ben Stiller is featured in the extended version of the music video for the song. It peaked at No. 33 in New Zealand and No. 27 in Australia. In the United States, it reached No. 5 on the Billboard Triple-A chart.

== Track listing ==
Australian CD single

1. "Taylor" (album version)
2. "Gone" (live)
3. "Girl I Want to Lay You Down" (live)
4. "Mudfootball" (live)

== Charts ==
=== Weekly charts ===
Weekly chart performance for "Taylor"
Chart (2004)	Peak position
Australia (ARIA)	27
New Zealand (Recorded Music NZ)	33
US Adult Alternative Airplay (Billboard)	5

=== Year-end charts ===
Year-end chart performance for "Taylor"
Chart (2004)	Position
US Triple-A (Billboard)	27

== Certifications ==
Certifications for "Taylor"
Region	Certification	Certified units/sales
Australia (ARIA)	2× Platinum	140,000^{‡}
New Zealand (RMNZ)	Platinum	30,000^{‡}
^{‡} Sales+streaming figures based on certification alone.

== Release history ==
Release dates and formats for "Taylor"
Region	Date	Format(s)	Label(s)	Ref.
United States	November 3, 2003	Hot AC; alternative; triple A radio	Brushfire	
Australia	March 22, 2004	CD	Brushfire; Modular	
