= On and On (Jack Johnson album) =

Studio album by Jack Johnson
- Released: May 6, 2003
- Recorded: 2002
- Studio: The Mango Tree, Hawaii
- Genre: Folk rock
- Length: 43:55
- Label: Brushfire, Universal
- Producer: Mario Caldato Jr.

Jack Johnson chronology
Brushfire Fairytales (2001)	On and On (2003)	In Between Dreams (2005)

Professional ratings
Aggregate scores
Source	Rating
Metacritic	58/100
Review scores
Source	Rating
AllMusic	3/5 stars
Blender	4/5 stars
E!	B−
Entertainment Weekly	B+
Now	4/5 stars
Q	2/5 stars
Rolling Stone	2/5 stars
Slant Magazine	2.5/5 stars
Spin	5/10
Tom Hull – on the Web	B

On and On is the second studio album by American singer-songwriter Jack Johnson, who provided the vocals and guitars. It was released in 2003 on Universal Records. Adam Topol played drums and percussion while Merlo Podlewski played bass guitar. The album was recorded at The Mango Tree studios in Hawaii.

A different version of the track "Rodeo Clowns" was originally published as a collaboration with G. Love & Special Sauce on the latter's 1999 album, Philadelphonic.

Johnson sang the chorus of his song "Gone" on the Black Eyed Peas' song "Gone Going", which appeared on their album Monkey Business. The song was nominated at the 2006 Grammy Awards for Best Pop Collaboration with Vocals.

== Track listing ==
All songs written by Jack Johnson, except where noted.

1. "Times Like These" – 2:22
2. "The Horizon Has Been Defeated" – 2:33
3. "Traffic in the Sky" – 2:50
4. "Taylor" – 3:59
5. "Gone" – 2:10
6. "Cupid" – 1:05
7. "Wasting Time" (Johnson, Adam Topol, Merlo Podlewski) – 3:50
8. "Holes to Heaven" – 2:54
9. "Dreams Be Dreams" – 2:12
10. "Tomorrow Morning" – 2:50
11. "Fall Line" – 1:35
12. "Cookie Jar" – 2:57
13. "Rodeo Clowns" – 2:38
14. "Cocoon" – 4:10
15. "Mediocre Bad Guys" – 3:00
16. "Symbol in My Driveway" – 2:55

== Personnel ==
Credits adapted from the album's liner notes.

Musicians

- Jack Johnson – vocals, guitar
- Adam Topol – drums, percussion
- Merlo Podlewski – bass guitar

Production

- Mario Caldato Jr. – producer, engineer, mixing
- Robert Carranza – engineer, mixing
- Bernie Grundman – mastering

== Charts ==
=== Weekly charts ===
Chart (2003–2005)	Peak position
Australian Albums (ARIA)	2
Austrian Albums (Ö3 Austria)	50
French Albums (SNEP)	94
German Albums (Offizielle Top 100)	88
Irish Albums (IRMA)	31
New Zealand Albums (RMNZ)	1
Scottish Albums (OCC)	99
Swiss Albums (Schweizer Hitparade)	62
UK Albums (OCC)	30
US Billboard 200	3

=== Year-end charts ===
Chart (2003)	Position
Australian Albums (ARIA)	19
New Zealand Albums (RMNZ)	24
US Billboard 200	85

Chart (2004)	Position
Australian Albums (ARIA)	24

=== Decade-end chart ===
Chart (2000–2009)	Position
Australian Albums (ARIA)	57

== Certifications ==
Region	Certification	Certified units/sales
Australia (ARIA)	6× Platinum	420,000^{‡}
Belgium (BRMA)	Gold	25,000^{*}
Brazil (Pro-Música Brasil)	Gold	50,000^{*}
Canada (Music Canada)	2× Platinum	200,000^{‡}
Denmark (IFPI Danmark)	Gold	20,000^{^}
Germany (BVMI)	Platinum	200,000^{‡}
New Zealand (RMNZ)	3× Platinum	45,000^{^}
United Kingdom (BPI)	Platinum	300,000^{^}
United States (RIAA)	Platinum	1,000,000^{^}
^{*} Sales figures based on certification alone.^{^} Shipments figures based on certification alone.^{‡} Sales+streaming figures based on certification alone.
