= Zach Gill =

American musician

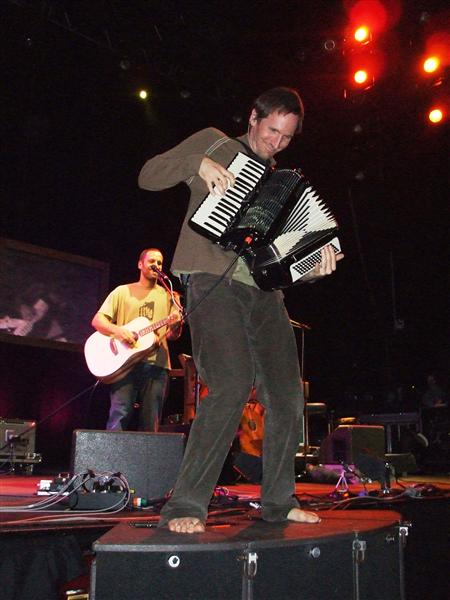
- Zach Gill performing with Jack Johnson in Christchurch, 2008

Background information
- Born: Zachary Dylan Gill; May 18, 1975 (age 50)
- Genres: Rock
- Occupation: Musician
- Instruments: Vocals, piano, accordion, melodica, ukulele, guitar, banjo, vibraphone
- Labels: Brushfire, Republic
- Website: www.zachgill.com

Zachary Dylan Gill (born May 18, 1975) is a multi-instrumentalist singer-songwriter. He performs regularly as a solo artist in addition to being a member of Animal Liberation Orchestra and Jack Johnson's band. Gill has performed at festivals and on television shows around the world, including Saturday Night Live, Late Show with David Letterman, The Tonight Show with Jay Leno, Bonnaroo, Glastonbury, Live Earth, and at the 2008 United States Presidential inauguration ball.

== Discography ==
=== Solo ===
- Dogwood Forest EP (2005)
- Snowman's Philosophy EP (2006)
- Zach Gill's Stuff (2008)
- Roasting Chestnuts with Zach Gill (2013)
- Life in the Multiverse (2017)
- Cocktail Yoga (2020)

=== With Django ===
- Contact (1993)
- Tabula Rasa (1994)
- The Fasting Showman single off Santa Barbara unsigned heroes volume? (1995)
- Django 4 song demo Django with David Brogan (1996)

=== With ALO, Animal Liberation Orchestra ===
- The Animal Liberation Orchestra and the Free range Horns Vs. L.A.G. (1998)
- One Size Fits All (1999)
- Expressions hot tub EP (2000)
- Time Expander (2002)
- Fly Between Falls (2004)
- Roses & Clover (2007)
- Man of the World (2010)
- Sounds Like This (2012)
- Tangle Of Time (2015)
- Creatures v.1 (2019)
- Creatures v.2 (2020)
- Silver Saturdays (2023)
- Frames (2025)

=== With Jack Johnson ===
- In Between Dreams (2005)
- Let it be sung single with Jack Johnson and Matt Costa (2006)
- Sleep Through the Static (2008)
- En concert (2010)
- To the Sea (2010)
- From Here to Now to You (2013)
- All the Light Above It Too (2017)
- Meet the Moonlight (2022)
