= Matt Costa =

American singer-songwriter (born 1982)

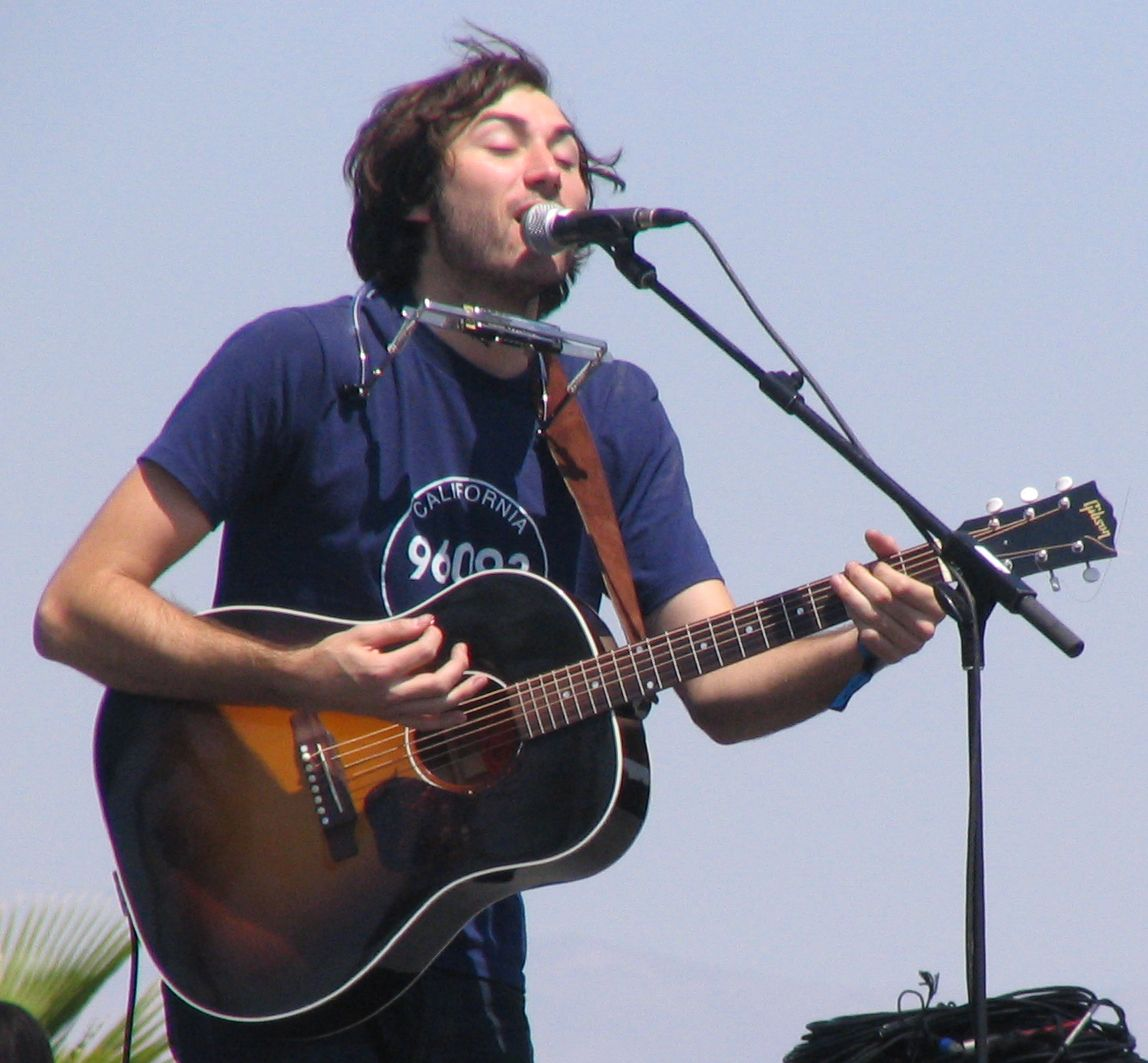
- Costa performing at the 2006 Coachella Valley Music and Arts Festival

Background information
- Born: Matthew Albert Costa; June 16, 1982 (age 44); Huntington Beach, California, United States
- Genres: Indie rock, folk rock
- Occupation: Singer-songwriter
- Instruments: Guitar, piano, harmonica
- Labels: Venerable Media, Brushfire, Dangerbird
- Website: MattCosta.com

Matthew Albert Costa (born June 16, 1982) is an American singer-songwriter from Huntington Beach, California, United States. He has 13 independent releases: 7 self-recorded EPs, 6 complete LPs, 4 of which are released via Brushfire Records. His first album in five years, Santa Rosa Fangs, was released on May 18, 2018, on Dangerbird Records.

== Life ==
Costa, who is of Portuguese descent, states that his father works in the airline business. In early 2003, Costa's homemade demo reached No Doubt guitarist Tom Dumont, who offered to record more demos for him in his home studio. Those first recordings led to two EPs (Matt Costa EP, Elasmosaurus EP) that Costa and Dumont distributed themselves. These were later combined and mixed by Phil Ek to form Costa's first full-length CD entitled Songs We Sing.

Costa spent the summer of 2005 opening on Jack Johnson's summer tour. He has since toured with Modest Mouse, Oasis, Ryan Adams & The Cardinals, G. Love & Special Sauce, and Death Cab for Cutie. Costa joined Jack Johnson for his 2006 European tour. He has also contributed to the Jack Johnson and Friends Curious George soundtrack; his track is entitled "Lullaby". This song was taken from his The Elasmosaurus EP. Costa has also toured extensively in Australia, New Zealand, Europe, Asia and South America.

The video for Costa's debut single "Cold December" was released February 2, 2006. On July 31, 2007, he released a song titled "If You Took To Me" as part of the environmentally minded polar bear documentary Arctic Tale and its soundtrack.

On October 7, 2007, Costa released the lead single, "Mr. Pitiful," from his record Unfamiliar Faces. The song "Mr. Pitiful" was used during a scene with Paul Rudd in the movie I Love You, Man, the redband trailer for the film Youth in Revolt starring Michael Cera, and the movie Marmaduke. The song is featured during the opening credits of The Answer Man. Apple also used an instrumental cut of this song for the worldwide iPhone 3GS ads.

On December 23, 2008, Costa married.

Mobile Chateau, Costa's third album, was released on September 21, 2010, via Brushfire Records. The record was recorded at Pheasant Studios in Santa Ana, California as Costa's first solo production.

In 2012, he released an EP titled Sacred Hills EP.

His fourth album, which he decided to self title, was released in 2013. It contained some songs from his previously released EP such as "Loving You" and "Good Times".

Shortly after the release of the self-titled album, along came a deluxe and commentary version of the album.

His song "Good Times" was featured at the end of an episode of the third season of HBO's Girls in 2014.

In 2015, Costa released a string of self recorded EPs. First of the storm came Eucalyptus EP, with its acoustic style. Mid-year brought Cat Mosta EP, and the end of the year carried the EP titled Neon Brain EP. Before the year ended, he released a Christmas song titled "Many Memories Ago".

Costa began 2016 with another EP called Anchor and the Albatross. Later, he released an album for a documentary titled Orange Sunshine. The documentary revolved around The Brotherhood of Eternal Love. The album held a psychedelic rock style. Ending 2016, Matt released a small bunch of songs recorded live when he had gone on a trip to London.

In 2017, the single "Where Have All My Heroes Gone" was released.

Costa's first album in five years, Santa Rosa Fangs, was released on May 18, 2018, on his new record label Dangerbird Records. Later, Matt released Santa Rosa Fangs (Novella Edition) in which he storytells the meaning behind the album and connects his real life with the fictional one he had created in the album. Two additional songs, "Lovely Saturday" and "Evening Star", were included on this edition.

== Discography ==
=== Albums ===
- Songs We Sing (2005) – re-released on Brushfire in 2006
- Unfamiliar Faces (2008)
- Mobile Chateau (2010)
- Matt Costa (2013)
- Santa Rosa Fangs (2018)
- Yellow Coat (2020)

=== EPs ===
- Matt Costa EP (2003)
- The Elasmosaurus EP (2005)
- Sacred Hills EP (2012)
- Eucalyptus EP (2015)
- Cat Mosta EP (2015)
- Neon Brain EP (2015)
- Anchor & the Albatross EP (2016)

=== Singles ===
- "Cold December" (2006)
- "Sweet Thursday" (2006)
- "Sunshine" (2006)
- "Mr. Pitiful" (2008)
- "Cigarette Eyes" (2008)
- "Witchcraft" (2010)
- "Good Times" (2013)
- "Sharon" (2018)

=== Samplers and soundtracks ===
- A Brokedown Melody Soundtrack (2006)
- Sing-A-Longs and Lullabies for the Film Curious George by Jack Johnson (2006)
- Brushfire Records Winter 2006 Music Sampler with Jack Johnson, G. Love & Special Sauce, & Money Mark (2006)
- Arctic Tale (2007)
- "Vienna" plays continually on in-room cable at the Marriott Vienna in Austria (2012)
