= Sitting, Waiting, Wishing =

2005 single by Jack Johnson

Single by Jack Johnson

from the album In Between Dreams
- B-side: "Free"
- Released: January 10, 2005
- Length: 3:03
- Label: Brushfire
- Songwriter: Jack Johnson
- Producer: Mario Caldato Jr.

Jack Johnson singles chronology
"Taylor" (2003)	"Sitting, Waiting, Wishing" (2005)	"Good People" (2005)

"Sitting, Waiting, Wishing" is a song written and performed by American singer-songwriter Jack Johnson. It is the sixth song on his third studio album, In Between Dreams, which was released in February 2005. The song was released as a single in January 2005, topping the US Billboard Triple A chart and entering the top 30 in Australia and New Zealand. The song peaked at number 65 in the United Kingdom in 2006, following Johnson's appearance at the 2006 BRIT Awards.

The single was nominated for a Grammy Award in the category of Best Male Pop Vocal Performance. Additionally, it was nominated for Best Male Video at the MTV Video Music Awards Japan ceremony in 2006. The music video features reverse narration, similar to Coldplay's video for "The Scientist". The song was inspired by one of Johnson's friends' pursuit of a woman.

== Background ==
Johnson explains the inspiration behind the song by saying: "A friend of mine was trying to get this girl named Michelle," said Johnson, "and I tried to write a song that would help him have a laugh at himself because he was spending so much time trying to get her and it obviously wasn't leading anywhere. That was one just to cheer up a friend."

== Track listings ==
CD single

1. "Sitting, Waiting, Wishing" - 3:09
2. "Free" (with Donavon Frankenreiter) - 2:35

German single

1. "Sitting, Waiting, Wishing" - 3:09
2. "Free" (with Donavon Frankenreiter) - 2:35
3. "Give It to You" (with G.Love) - 3:22
4. "Taylor" (Video)

== Charts ==
=== Weekly charts ===
Chart (2005–2006)	Peak position
Australia (ARIA)	24
Austria (Ö3 Austria Top 40)	51
Canada AC Top 30 (Radio & Records)	24
Canada Hot AC Top 30 (Radio & Records)	17
Canada Rock Top 30 (Radio & Records)	12
Germany (GfK)	82
Netherlands (Single Top 100)	67
New Zealand (Recorded Music NZ)	25
Scottish Singles Sales (Official Charts)	78
UK Singles (Official Charts)	65
US Billboard Hot 100	66
US Adult Alternative Airplay (Billboard)	1
US Adult Pop Airplay (Billboard)	18
US Alternative Airplay (Billboard)	25

=== Year-end charts ===
Chart (2005)	Position
US Adult Top 40 (Billboard)	49
US Modern Rock Tracks (Billboard)	72
US Triple-A (Billboard)	3

== Certifications ==
Region	Certification	Certified units/sales
Australia (ARIA)	2× Platinum	140,000^{‡}
Brazil (Pro-Música Brasil)	Platinum	40,000^{‡}
Canada (Music Canada)	2× Platinum	160,000^{‡}
New Zealand (RMNZ)	2× Platinum	60,000^{‡}
United Kingdom (BPI)	Silver	200,000^{‡}
United States (RIAA)	Gold	500,000^{*}
^{*} Sales figures based on certification alone.^{‡} Sales+streaming figures based on certification alone.

== Release history ==
Region	Date	Format(s)	Label(s)	Ref(s).
United States	January 10, 2005	Alternative; triple A radio	Brushfire	
United States	January 31, 2001	Hot adult contemporary radio	Brushfire	
Australia	February 14, 2005	CD	Brushfire	
United Kingdom	March 14, 2005	CD	Brushfire	
United States	May 2–3, 2005	Contemporary hit radio	Brushfire	
United Kingdom (re-release)	November 14, 2005	CD	Brushfire	
