= From Here to Now to You =

Studio album by Jack Johnson
- Released: September 17, 2013
- Recorded: 2011–2013
- Genre: Folk rock, soft rock
- Length: 41:15
- Label: Brushfire, Republic
- Producer: Mario Caldato, Jr.

Jack Johnson chronology
Jack Johnson and Friends – Best of Kokua Festival (2012)	From Here to Now to You (2013)	From Here to Now to You Live (2014)

Singles from From Here to Now to You
- 1. "I Got You" Released: June 10, 2013; 2. "Radiate" Released: September 16, 2013; 3. "Shot Reverse Shot" Released: December 23, 2013

From Here to Now to You is the sixth studio album by American singer-songwriter Jack Johnson. The album was released on September 17, 2013. The album's first single, "I Got You", was released on June 10, 2013.

== Commercial performance ==
The album debuted at number one on the Billboard 200 chart, with first-week sales of 117,000 copies in the United States. The album also debuted at the top of the Canadian Albums Chart, as well as the Billboard Digital Albums chart, Top Rock Albums chart, Alternative Albums chart, and Folk Albums chart in the United States.

== Track listing ==
All lyrics are written by Jack Johnson; all music is composed by Johnson, except where noted.

From Here to Now to You track listing
No.	Title	Length
1.	"I Got You"	2:59
2.	"Washing Dishes"	3:26
3.	"Shot Reverse Shot"	3:10
4.	"Never Fade"	4:02
5.	"Tape Deck"	3:21
6.	"Don't Believe a Thing I Say"	3:14
7.	"As I Was Saying"	3:45
8.	"You Remind Me of You"	2:24
9.	"Radiate" (Johnson, Merlo Podlewski, Zach Gill, Adam Topol)	4:15
10.	"Ones and Zeros" (Johnson, Podlewski, Gill, Topol)	4:27
11.	"Change" (featuring Ben Harper)	3:14
12.	"Home"	3:01

Target bonus tracks
No.	Title	Length
13.	"I Got You" (4-track demo)	3:46
14.	"As I Was Saying" (4-track demo)	3:36

== Personnel ==
- Jack Johnson – vocals, guitar, ukulele, dobro, percussion
- Adam Topol – drums, percussion
- Merlo Podlewski – bass, piano, vibes, guitar
- Zach Gill – piano, wurlitzer, vibes, glockenspiel, accordion, melodica, vocals, bass kalimba
- Ben Harper – vocals, weissenborn slide guitar on "Change"

== Charts ==
=== Weekly charts ===
Weekly chart performance for From Here to Now to You
Chart (2013)	Peak position
Australian Albums (ARIA)	3
Austrian Albums (Ö3 Austria)	5
Belgian Albums (Ultratop Flanders)	8
Belgian Albums (Ultratop Wallonia)	19
Canadian Albums (Billboard)	1
Danish Albums (Hitlisten)	9
Dutch Albums (Album Top 100)	8
French Albums (SNEP)	27
German Albums (Offizielle Top 100)	9
Italian Albums (FIMI)	17
Japanese Albums(Oricon)	16
New Zealand Albums (RMNZ)	3
Norwegian Albums (VG-lista)	19
Portuguese Albums (AFP)	12
South Korean Albums (Circle)	40
Scottish Albums (OCC)	13
Spanish Albums (Promusicae)	21
Swiss Albums (Schweizer Hitparade)	5
UK Albums (OCC)	7
UK Album Downloads (OCC)	4
US Billboard 200	1
US Top Alternative Albums (Billboard)	1
US Americana/Folk Albums (Billboard)	1
US Top Rock Albums (Billboard)	1

=== Year-end charts ===
Year-end chart performance for From Here to Now to You
Chart (2013)	Position
Australian Albums (ARIA)	98
Canadian Albums (Billboard)	45
US Billboard 200	122
US Top Alternative Albums (Billboard)	19
US Folk Albums (Billboard)	7
US Top Rock Albums (Billboard)	29
Chart (2014)	Position
US Top Alternative Albums (Billboard)	43
US Folk Albums (Billboard)	5
US Top Rock Albums (Billboard)	62

== Certifications and sales ==
Certifications and sales for From Here to Now to You
Region	Certification	Certified units/sales
Australia (ARIA)	Gold	35,000^{‡}
Canada (Music Canada)	Platinum	80,000^{‡}
New Zealand (RMNZ)	Gold	7,500^{‡}
Portugal (AFP)	2× Platinum	30,000^{^}
United Kingdom (BPI)	Silver	60,000^{‡}
United States	—	177,000
^{^} Shipments figures based on certification alone.^{‡} Sales+streaming figures based on certification alone.
