= Rob Machado =

American surfer (born 1973)

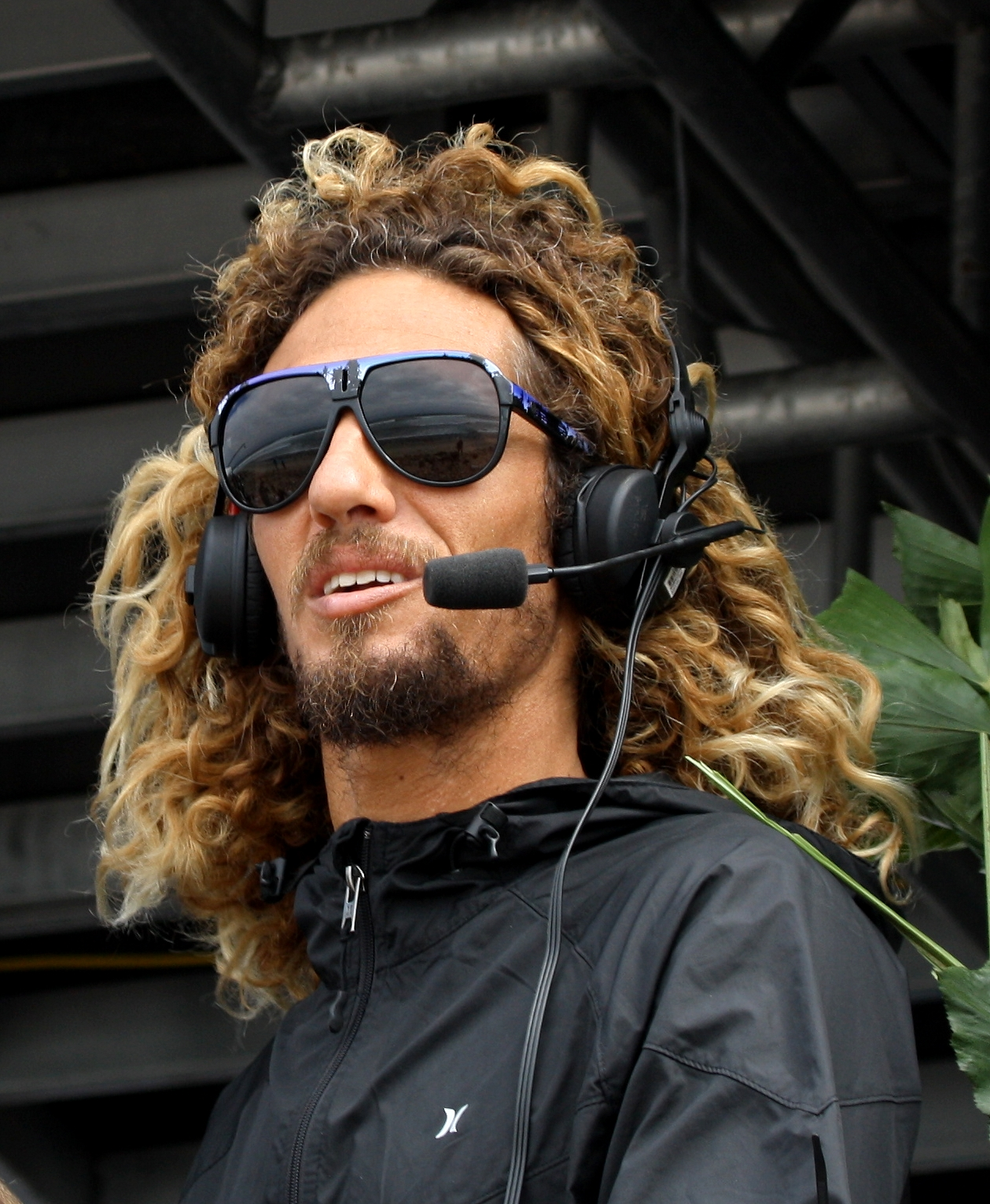
- Machado in 2009

Personal information
- Born: Robert Edward Machado; 16 October 1973 (age 52) Sydney, New South Wales, Australia
- Height: 5 ft 10 in (178 cm)
- Weight: 150 lb (68 kg)

Sport
- Sport: Surfing

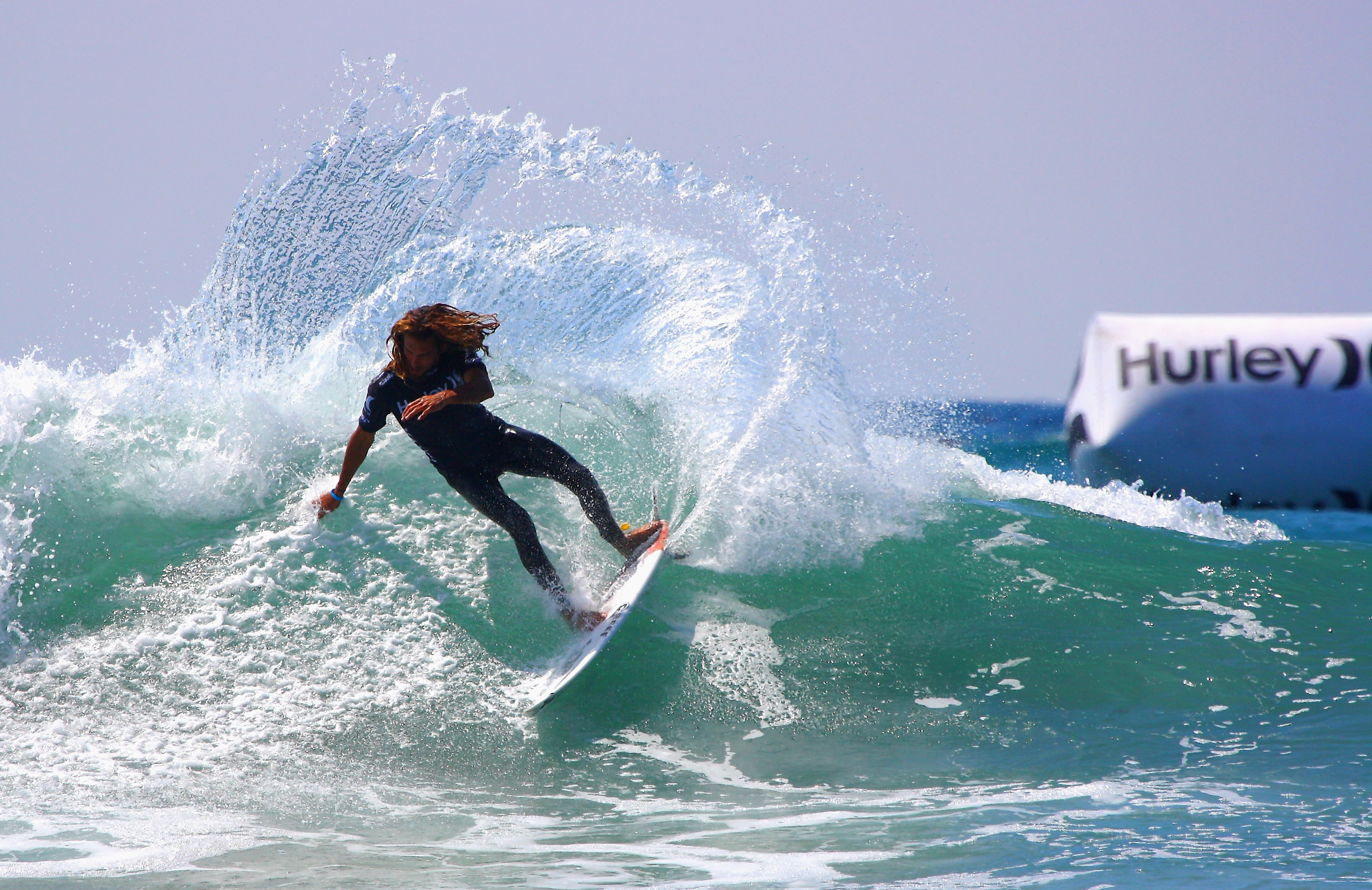
Machado performing a cutback at Lower Trestles in Southern California

Robert Edward Machado (born 16 October 1973) is an Australian born American professional surfer. Rob competed on the World Surf League Championship Tour from 1993-2001. Since then he has become a professional free surfer.

Rob Machado is known for his casual, laid-back style both in and out of the water. Along with his fluid surfing style, which has earned him the nickname "Mr. Smoothy", he is regarded as one of the best-known goofy-foot surfers in the world today.

== Early life ==
Machado attended San Dieguito High School. He describes himself in interviews, vlogs, and social media as a "soul surfer," or freesurfer. He was largely active in the competitive surfing scene from 1993 to 2000, and was still competing in World Surf League events until 2012.

== Career ==
Machado hosts and participates in an annual event held at his home reef called the Rob Machado Surf Classic and Beach Fair, which is an amateur competition for the locals of all ages, and it includes demo sessions with Machado and other pros.

Machado portrayed "himself" in the 2007 animated picture, Surf's Up, as well as playing himself in the art film Kingshighway - Rob Machado and Joel Tudor by Paulo Carvalho (Kid Rio) and Danny Camp. Machado also starred in his own feature film released in the late 90s titled Drifting. Additionally, Rob wrote and starred in the 2009 film, The Drifter.

Machado is a 2011 inductee into the Surfing Walk of Fame in Huntington Beach, California, in the surf champion category.

On 31 December 2019, Machado announced he would no longer be associated with Hurley International after having been sponsored by the surf company for nearly 20 years, due to the new ownership group's desire to cut spending. He is now sponsored by Vuori, Reef, Dragon and Firewire. He regularly surfs in San Diego, where he has gained prominence.

== Environmental activism ==
Machado formed the Rob Machado Foundation, an organization focused on environmental causes.

== Career highlights ==
Machado has won the Hawaii's Pipeline Masters (Triple Crown of Surfing). and the U.S. Open of Surfing,
