= Brushfire Records =

- Parent company: Universal Music Group
- Founded: 2002
- Founder: Jack Johnson; Emmett Malloy
- Distributor(s): Republic Records (in the US); Virgin EMI Records (in the UK)
- Genre: Rock, pop
- Country of origin: U.S.
- Location: Los Angeles, California
- Official website: brushfirerecords.com

Brushfire Records is a record label owned by singer-songwriter Jack Johnson. Formerly known as The Moonshine Conspiracy Records, the label was founded to release soundtracks for Woodshed Films, a company owned by Johnson, Emmett Malloy, and Chris Malloy to produce the surfing documentary Thicker than Water.

The label has released several of Johnson's albums, including Sing-A-Longs and Lullabies for the Film Curious George, In Between Dreams, Sleep Through the Static, To the Sea, From Here to Now to You, and All the Light Above It Too.

== Artists ==
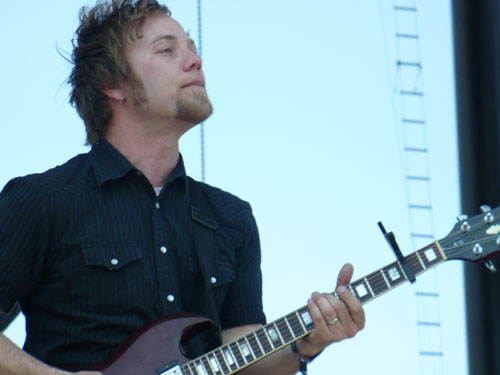
Rogue Wave - live in concert

=== Roster ===
- Animal Liberation Orchestra (2006–Present)
- Bahamas (2009–Present)
- Zach Gill (2008–Present)
- Neil Halstead (2008–Present)
- Jack Johnson (2002–Present)
- Paula Fuga (2021–Present)

=== Past artists ===
- Donavon Frankenreiter (2002–2006)
- Money Mark (2006)
- Rogue Wave (2007–2013)
- Matt Costa (2006–2018)
- G. Love & Special Sauce (2004–2020)

== Films ==
- Thicker than Water (2000)
- The September Sessions (2002)
- Sprout (2005)
- A Brokedown Melody (2006)
- The Present (2009)
- 180 Degrees South: Conquerors of the Useless (2010)
- The Smog of the Sea (2017)

== Soundtracks ==
- Sing-A-Longs and Lullabies for the Film Curious George (2006)
- This Warm December: A Brushfire Holiday, Vol. 1 (2008)
- This Warm December: A Brushfire Holiday, Vol. 2 (2011)
- The Tribes of Palos Verdes (2017)
- This Warm December: A Brushfire Holiday, Vol. 3 (2019)
- 180° South: Conquerors of the Useless (2010)
