= Jack Johnson discography =

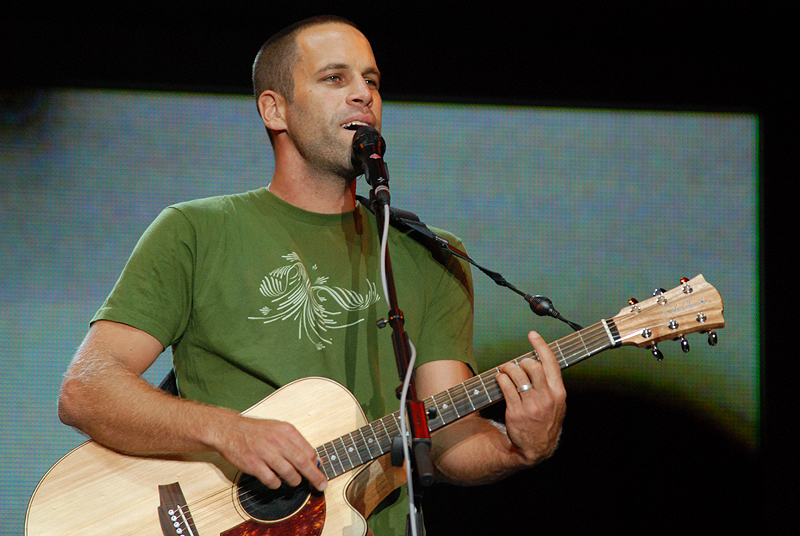
- Studio albums: 8
- Extended plays: 3
- Soundtrack albums: 2
- Live albums: 4
- Singles: 33
- Video albums: 4
- Music videos: 21
- Remix albums: 2
- Other appearances: 27

Hawaii-born musician Jack Johnson has released eight studio albums, two soundtrack albums, two remix albums, four live albums, four video albums, three extended plays (EPs), and thirty-three singles.

Johnson's first album was the result of his primary hobbies, filmmaking and surfing. He used his songs in his personal surf videos, and released a soundtrack accompanying his film, Thicker Than Water. His first commercial record was Brushfire Fairytales, and the highest selling of his albums is Sleep Through the Static. All of Johnson's albums have been released through his personal record label, Brushfire Records.

As of 2010, Johnson has sold 10.8 million copies of albums in the United States according to Nielsen SoundScan. As of 2015, Johnson has sold 20 million albums worldwide.

== Albums ==
=== Studio albums ===
Title	Album details	Peak chart positions										Sales	Certifications
Title	Album details	US	AUS	AUT	CAN	FRA	GER	NL	NZ	SWI	UK	Sales	Certifications
Brushfire Fairytales	Released: January 23, 2001; Label: Enjoy, Universal; Formats: CD, LP, digital download	34	13	—	—	178	—	— (Note: Brushfire Fairytales did not enter the Dutch Album Top 100, but entered the Dutch Midprice Albums chart at number three.)	1	—	36	US: 1,200,000	RIAA: Platinum; ARIA: 3× Platinum; BPI: Platinum; MC: Gold; RMNZ: 3× Platinum
On and On	Released: May 6, 2003; Label: Universal; Formats: CD, LP, digital download	3	2	50	—	94	88	— (Note: On and On did not enter the Dutch Album Top 100, but entered the Dutch Midprice Albums chart at number one.)	1	62	30	US: 1,200,000	RIAA: Platinum; ARIA: 6× Platinum; BPI: Platinum; BVMI: Platinum; MC: Gold; RMNZ: 2× Platinum
In Between Dreams	Released: March 1, 2005; Label: Brushfire, Universal; Formats: CD, LP, digital download	2	1	13	3	46	7	7	1	8	1		RIAA: 2× Platinum; ARIA: 5× Platinum; BPI: 5× Platinum; BVMI: 3× Gold; IRMA: 2× Platinum; MC: 3× Platinum; RMNZ: 4× Platinum
Sleep Through the Static	Released: February 1, 2008; Label: Brushfire, Universal; Formats: CD, LP, digital download	1	1	3	1	6	2	4	1	2	1	US: 1,700,000	RIAA: Platinum; ARIA: 2× Platinum; BPI: Gold; BVMI: Gold; IRMA: Gold; RMNZ: Platinum
To the Sea	Released: June 1, 2010; Label: Brushfire, Universal; Formats: CD, LP, digital download	1	1	4	1	18	4	8	1	1	1		RIAA: Gold; ARIA: Platinum; BPI: Gold; BVMI: Gold; MC: Platinum; RMNZ: Gold
From Here to Now to You	Released: September 17, 2013; Label: Brushfire, Universal; Formats: CD, LP, digital download	1	3	5	1	27	9	8	3	5	7	US: 154,000	ARIA: Gold; BPI: Silver; MC: Gold
All the Light Above It Too	Released: September 8, 2017; Label: Brushfire, Universal; Formats: CD, LP, digital download	5	3	27	8	64	24	29	8	7	46	US: 41,000 (debut)	
Meet the Moonlight	Released: June 24, 2022; Label: Brushfire, Universal; Formats: CD, LP, digital download	47	70	58	84	— (Note: Meet the Moonlight did not enter the French Album Top 200, but peaked at number 156 on the French Top Album Physiques chart.)	45	—	—	11	— (Note: Meet the Moonlight did not enter the UK Albums Chart, but peaked at number 36 on the UK Album Downloads Chart.)		
"—" denotes a release that did not chart or was not released.

=== Soundtrack albums ===
Title	Details	Peak chart positions										Sales	Certifications
Title	Details	US	AUS	AUT	CAN	FRA	GER	NL	NZ	SWI	UK	Sales	Certifications
Sing-A-Longs and Lullabies for the Film Curious George	Released: February 7, 2006; Label: Brushfire, Universal; Formats: CD, LP, digital download	1	1	3	1	42	6	9	1	2	15	US: 1,600,000	RIAA: Platinum; ARIA: Platinum; BPI: Gold; BVMI: Gold; RMNZ: Platinum
Surfilmusic (Soundtrack & 4-Tracks)	Released: May 15, 2026; Label: Brushfire; Formats: CD, LP, streaming	—	—	—	—	—	—	—	—	93	—		
"—" denotes a release that did not chart.

=== Live albums ===
Title	Details	Peak chart positions									
Title	Details	US	AUS	AUT	CAN	FRA	GER	NL	NZ	SWI	UK
En Concert	Released: October 27, 2009; Label: Brushfire, Universal; Formats: CD, LP, digital download	11	21	26	9	106	57	34	32	72	— (Note: En Concert did not enter the UK Albums Chart, but peaked at number 46 on the UK Album Downloads Chart.)
Jack Johnson and Friends: Best of Kokua Festival	Released: April 17, 2012; Label: Brushfire, Universal; Formats: CD, LP, digital download	12	—	—	15	—	—	—	—	—	— (Note: Jack Johnson and Friends - Best of Kokua Festival did not enter the UK Albums Chart, but peaked at number 99 on the UK Album Downloads Chart.)
Live at Third Man Records 6-15-2013	Released: November 29, 2013; Label: Third Man; Formats: LP	—	—	—	—	—	—	—	—	—	—
Songs for Maui (Live at the Maui Arts & Cultural Center, 2012)	Released: 2023; Label: Brushfire; Format: Digital download	—	—	—	—	—	—	—	—	—	—
"—" denotes a release that did not chart or was not released.

=== Compilation albums ===
Title	Details	Peak chart positions
Title	Details	JPN
The Essentials	Released: July 4, 2018; Label: Brushfire, Universal; Formats: CD, digital download	68

=== Remix albums ===
Title	Details	Peak chart positions
Title	Details	US
Sleep Through the Static: Remixed	Released: September 23, 2008; Label: Brushfire, Universal; Formats: CD, digital download	118
In Between Dub	Released: June 2, 2023; Label: Brushfire, Universal; Formats: CD, Vinyl, digital download	—

=== Video albums ===
Title	Details	Certifications
Kokua Festival 2004/2005	Released: 2005; Label: Brushfire, Universal; Formats: DVD	
A Weekend at the Greek	Released: November 21, 2005; Label: Brushfire, Universal; Formats: DVD, UMD	RIAA: Platinum; ARIA: Gold
Live in Japan	Released: December 13, 2005; Label: Brushfire, Universal; Formats: DVD, UMD	
En Concert	Released: October 27, 2009; Label: Brushfire, Universal; Formats: DVD	

== Extended plays ==
Title	EP details	Peak chart positions
Title	EP details	US
Some Live Songs (with G. Love and Donavon Frankenreiter)	Released: December 14, 2004; Label: Universal; Formats: CD, digital download	—
Sessions@AOL	Released: August 2, 2005; Label: Universal; Format: digital download	—
From Here to Now to You Live	Released: April 22, 2014; Label: Brushfire; Format: digital download	35

== Singles ==
Title	Year	Peak chart positions										Certifications	Album
Title	Year	US	US AAA	AUS	AUT	CAN	GER	JPN	NL	NZ	UK	Certifications	Album
"Flake"	2002	73	1	—	—	—	—	—	—	6	—	ARIA: Gold; MC: Gold; RMNZ: Platinum	Brushfire Fairytales
"Bubble Toes"	2003	—	6	—	—	—	—	—	—	—	—	MC: Gold; RMNZ: Gold	Brushfire Fairytales
"The Horizon Has Been Defeated"	2003	—	1	51	—	—	—	—	—	43	—		On and On
"Wasting Time"	2003	—	3	—	—	—	—	—	—	—	—		On and On
"Taylor"	2004	—	5	27	—	—	—	—	—	33	—	ARIA: 2× Platinum; RMNZ: Platinum	On and On
"Sitting, Waiting, Wishing"	2005	66	1	24	51	—	82	—	67	25	65	RIAA: Gold; ARIA: 2× Platinum; BPI: Silver; MC: 2× Platinum; RMNZ: 2× Platinum	In Between Dreams
"Good People"	2005	—	1	—	—	—	—	—	92	25	50	RIAA: Gold; ARIA: Platinum; BPI: Silver; MC: Platinum; RMNZ: Platinum	In Between Dreams
"Breakdown"	2005	—	2	—	—	—	—	—	—	—	73	ARIA: Platinum; MC: Gold; RMNZ: Gold	In Between Dreams
"Better Together"	2006	—	12	—	—	—	—	77	—	—	24	RIAA: Gold; ARIA: 6× Platinum; BPI: 2× Platinum; BVMI: Gold; MC: 4× Platinum; RMNZ: 5× Platinum	In Between Dreams
"Upside Down" (solo or featuring Money Mark)	2006	38	1	— (Note: "Upside Down" did not enter the Australian ARIA Singles Chart but peaked at number 19 on the ARIA Digital Track Chart.)	36	9	54	—	56	22	30	RIAA: Platinum; ARIA: 2× Platinum; BPI: Platinum; BVMI: Gold; MC: 2× Platinum; RMNZ: 4× Platinum	Sing-A-Longs and Lullabies for the Film Curious George
"Talk of the Town"	2006	—	—	—	—	—	—	—	96	—	—		Sing-A-Longs and Lullabies for the Film Curious George
"Imagine"	2007	90	—	—	—	—	90	—	—	—	—	RMNZ: Gold	Instant Karma
"If I Had Eyes"	2007	47	1	53	37	21	67	7	60	33	60	ARIA: Gold; MC: Gold	Sleep Through the Static
"Sleep Through the Static"	2007	—	—	69	—	—	—	—	—	—	150		Sleep Through the Static
"Same Girl" (Brazil-exclusive single)	2008	—	—	—	—	—	—	—	—	—	—		Sleep Through the Static
"Hope"	2008	—	2	—	—	—	—	—	—	—	—		Sleep Through the Static
"Go On"	2008	—	14	—	—	—	—	—	—	—	—		Sleep Through the Static
"You and Your Heart"	2010	20	1	66	21	39	64	8	—	30	128	MC: Gold	To the Sea
"At or with Me"	2010	—	1	—	—	—	—	—	—	—	—		To the Sea
"From the Clouds"	2011	—	2	—	—	—	—	—	—	—	—		To the Sea
"In the Morning"	2011	— (Note: "In the Morning" did not enter the Billboard Hot 100, but peaked at number six on the Bubbling Under Hot 100 chart.)	29	—	—	—	—	—	—	—	—		This Warm December: A Brushfire Holiday Vol. 2
"I Got You"	2013	88	1	64	—	84	—	26	—	—	—	ARIA: Platinum; MC: Platinum; RMNZ: Gold	From Here to Now to You
"Radiate"	2013	—	15	—	—	—	—	—	—	—	—		From Here to Now to You
"Shot Reverse Shot"	2013	—	—	—	—	—	—	—	—	—	—		From Here to Now to You
"Fragments"	2017	—	—	—	—	—	—	—	—	—	—		All the Light Above It Too
"My Mind Is for Sale"	2017	—	2	—	—	—	—	—	—	—	—		All the Light Above It Too
"Sunsets for Somebody Else"	2017	—	—	—	—	—	—	—	—	—	—	ARIA: Gold; MC: Gold; RMNZ: Gold	All the Light Above It Too
"You Can't Control It"	2017	—	—	—	—	—	—	—	—	—	—		All the Light Above It Too
"Big Sur"	2017	—	22	—	—	—	—	—	—	—	—		All the Light Above It Too
"Willie Got Me Stoned"	2018	—	—	—	—	—	—	—	—	—	—		All the Light Above It Too
"Big Sur (Mike D remix)" (Japan-exclusive single)	2018	—	—	—	—	—	—	—	—	—	—		Jack Johnson: The Essentials
"New Axe"	2019	—	—	—	—	—	—	—	—	—	—		This Warm December: A Brushfire Holiday Vol. 3
"Don't Let Me Down" (with Milky Chance)	2020	—	1	—	—	—	—	—	—	— (Note: "Don't Let Me Down" did not enter the NZ Top 40 Singles Chart, but peaked at number 22 on the NZ Hot Singles Chart.)	—		Non-album singles
"The Captain Is Drunk"	2020	—	— (Note: "The Captain Is Drunk" did not enter the Adult Alternative Songs chart, but peaked at number 35 on the Adult Alternative Indicator chart with 171 weekly plays, without being released as a radio single.)	—	—	—	—	—	—	—	—		Non-album singles
"If Ever" (with Paula Fuga, featuring Ben Harper)	2021	—	24	—	—	—	—	—	—	— (Note: "If Ever" did not enter the NZ Top 40 Singles Chart, but peaked at number 40 on the NZ Hot Singles Chart.)	—		Rain on Sunday
"One Step Ahead"	2022	—	1	—	—	—	—	— (Note: "One Step Ahead" did not enter the Billboard Japan Hot 100 chart, but peaked at number 18 on the Billboard Japan Hot Overseas chart.)	—	—	—		Meet the Moonlight
"Don't Look Now"	2022	—	36	—	—	—	—	—	—	—	—		Meet the Moonlight
"Traffic in the Sky" (Subatomic Sound System Dub)	2023	—	—	—	—	—	—	—	—	—	—		Non-album singles
"Home" (with Stick Figure)	2024	—	—	—	—	—	—	—	—	— (Note: "Home" did not enter the NZ Top 40 Singles Chart, but peaked at number 28 on the NZ Hot Singles Chart.)	—		Non-album singles
"Hold On to the Light" (with Hermanos Gutiérrez)	2025	—	—	—	—	—	—	—	—	— (Note: "Hold on to the Light" did not enter the NZ Top 40 Singles Chart, but peaked at number 34 on the NZ Hot Singles Chart.)	—		Non-album singles
"Drink the Water" (with Hermanos Gutiérrez)	2026	—	—	—	—	—	—	—	—	—	—		Surfilmusic (Soundtrack & 4-Tracks)
"—" denotes a release that did not chart or was not released

== Other charted and certified songs ==
Title	Year	Peak chart positions									Certifications	Album
Title	Year	US AAA	US Alt. Dig.	US Jazz	US Pop	US Rock	US Rock Dig.	BEL Tip	JPN	NZ Hot	Certifications	Album
"The News"	2001	—	—	—	—	—	—	—	—	—	RIAA: Gold	Brushfire Fairytales
"A Pirate Looks at Forty"	2002	—	—	37	—	—	37	—	—	—		The September Sessions
"Free" (Donavon Frankenreiter featuring Jack Johnson)	2004	—	—	—	—	—	—	—	—	—	RMNZ: Gold	Donavon Frankenreiter
"Gone Going" (Black Eyed Peas featuring Jack Johnson)	2005	—	—	—	37	—	—	—	—	—		Monkey Business
"Let It Be Sung" (featuring Matt Costa and Zach Gill)	2006	19	—	—	—	—	—	—	—	—		A Brokedown Melody Soundtrack
"Never Know"	2006	—	—	—	—	—	—	—	—	—	ARIA: Gold; MCL Gold; RMNZ: Gold	In Between Dreams
"Banana Pancakes"	2006	—	—	—	—	—	—	—	—	—	RIAA: Platinum; ARIA: 3× Platinum; BPI: Platinum; MC: 2× Platinum; RMNZ: 3× Platinum	In Between Dreams
"Do You Remember"	2006	—	—	—	—	—	—	—	—	—	ARIA: Gold; MC: Gold; RMNZ: Gold	In Between Dreams
"Constellations" (Demo from the Mango Tree)	2006	—	—	—	—	—	—	—	—	—	ARIA: Gold	In Between Dreams
"Rudolph the Red-Nosed Reindeer"	2007	—	—	—	—	—	—	—	79	—		Stockings By the Fire
"Angel"	2008	—	—	—	—	—	—	—	—	—	ARIA: Gold; MC: Gold	Sleep Through the Static
"My Little Girl"	2010	—	—	—	—	—	24	—	—	—		To the Sea
"To the Sea"	2010	—	—	—	—	—	27	—	—	—		To the Sea
"Times Like These (Live From Red Rocks)"	2010	—	—	—	—	—	—	—	—	—	ARIA: Gold; RMNZ: Gold	Download to Donate for Haiti
"Home"	2013	—	25	—	—	49	28	—	—	28		From Here to Now to You
"Washing Dishes"	2013	—	—	—	—	—	—	55	—	—		From Here to Now to You
"Subplots"	2017	—	—	—	—	—	38	—	—	—		All the Light Above It Too
"—" denotes releases that did not chart or were not released in that territory.

== Other appearances ==
Title	Year	Other artist(s)	Album
"Rodeo Clowns"	1999	G. Love & Special Sauce	Philadelphonic
"Posters"	2001	—N/a	Out Cold
"Pirate Looks at 40"	2002	—N/a	The September Sessions
"F-Stop Blues"	2002	—N/a	The September Sessions
"Moonshine"	2003	—N/a	Thicker Than Water
"Rainbow"	2003	—N/a	Thicker Than Water
"The Cove"	2003	—N/a	Thicker Than Water
"Holes to Heaven"	2003	—N/a	Thicker Than Water
"Breakdown"	2004	—N/a	A Brokedown Melody
"Let it Be Sung"	2004	Matt Costa, Zach Gill	A Brokedown Melody
"Home"	2004	—N/a	A Brokedown Melody
"Give it to You"	2004	G. Love & Special Sauce	The Hustle
"Free"	2004	Donavon Frankenreiter	Donavon Frankenreiter
"Breakdown" (Handsome Boy Modeling School remix)	2004	—N/a	White People
"Face Up"	2004	Ted Lennon	Ted Lennon
"Butternut"	2005	Tommy Guerrero, Money Mark, Adam Topol	Sprout
"Demon Lover"	2005	Tommy Guerrero, Money Mark, Adam Topol	Sprout
"Spanish Flowers"	2005	Tommy Guerrero, Money Mark, Adam Topol	Sprout
"Badfish" / "Boss D.J."	2005	—N/a	Look at All the Love We Found
"Gone Going"	2005	The Black Eyed Peas	Monkey Business
"Girl, I Wanna Lay You Down"	2005	Animal Liberation Orchestra	Fly Between Falls
"Rainbow"	2006	G. Love & Special Sauce	Lemonade
"Better Together"	2006	—N/a	Rhythms del Mundo: Cuba
"I Shall Be Released"	2007	ALO	Endless Highway: The Music of The Band
"Mama, You've Been on My Mind" / "A Fraction of Last Thoughts on Woody Guthrie"	2007	—N/a	I'm Not There
"Rudolph the Red-Nosed Reindeer"	2007	—N/a	Stockings By the Fire
"Someday at Christmas"	2008	—N/a	This Warm December: A Brushfire Holiday Vol. 1
"Rudolph the Red-Nosed Reindeer"	2008	—N/a	This Warm December: A Brushfire Holiday Vol. 1
"Imagine"	2009	—N/a	Rhythms del Mundo Classics
"Spring Wind"	2010	—N/a	180° South Soundtrack
"In the Morning"	2011	—N/a	This Warm December: A Brushfire Holiday Vol. 2
"Angel (Holiday)"	2011	—N/a	This Warm December: A Brushfire Holiday Vol. 2
"So in Love" (Acoustic Remix)	2012	Ted Lennon, Colbie Caillat	—N/a
"Farewell"	2013	Manuel Garcia, Silvia Tómas & Paula Fuga	El Mar, Mi Alma
"Have Yourself a Merry Little Christmas"	2013	Zach Gill	Roastin' Chestnuts With Zach Gill
"Escape (The Pina Colada Song)"	2013	—N/a	The Secret Life of Walter Mitty
"I Wrote Mr. Tamborine Man"	2018	John Craigie	Scarecrow (Deluxe Version)
"A Place in the Sun"	2021	Jake Shimabukuro & Paula Fuga	Jake & Friends
