= Bahamas Plastic Movement =

Nonprofit against plastic pollution in the Bahamas

- Formation: 2013; 13 years ago
- Headquarters: Eleuthera, The Bahamas
- Region served: The Bahamas
- Founder: Kristal Ambrose
- Website: bahamasplasticmovement.org

The Bahamas Plastic Movement is a nonprofit organization based out of Eleuthera in the Bahamas that focuses on reducing plastic pollution. The organization was founded in 2013 by Kristal Ambrose. The organization specializes in using youth to end plastic pollution. They are an active member of the Plastic Pollution Coalition.

In 2017, the Bahamas Plastic Movement helped create Jack Johnson's music video for "You Can't Control It," and the cover for his album All the Light Above It Too.

== Plastic bag ban ==
In 2018 a youth delegation from the Bahamas Plastic Movement traveled to Nassau, Bahamas to meet with Romauld Ferreira, Minister of the Environment and Housing, to ban plastic bags in the Bahamas. The Bahamas Plastic Movement claimed that if plastic pollution on beaches increased that $8.5 million in tourism would be lost. Fereira and his cabinet have since approved plans to phase out plastic bags by 2020.
