= The Essentials (Jack Johnson album) =

Greatest hits album by Jack Johnson
- Released: July 4, 2018
- Genre: Rock
- Length: 61:38
- Labels: Brushfire, Columbia, Sony Music
- Producers: Mario Caldato, Jr.; Robbie Lackritz; JP Plunier; Robert Carranza; Zach Gill; Adam Topol; Merlo Podlewski

Jack Johnson chronology
All the Light Above It Too (2017)	The Essentials (2018)	Meet the Moonlight (2022)

Singles from The Essentials
- 1. "Big Sur (Remix)" Released: July 4, 2018

The Essentials is a compilation album by American musician Jack Johnson. The album features 18 of Johnson's greatest hits over eight of his albums. The album was released only in Japan on July 4, 2018 on CD and for digital download. The album also features Mike D's "Big Sur" remix as the lead single.

== Track listing ==
No.	Title	Length
1.	"Banana Pancakes"	3:11
2.	"The Horizon Has Been Defeated" (Single Edit)	2:32
3.	"Better Together"	3:27
4.	"Flake"	4:43
5.	"Good People"	3:28
6.	"Sitting, Waiting, Wishing"	3:03
7.	"Gone"	2:08
8.	"Bubble Toes"	3:59
9.	"Upside Down"	3:28
10.	"If I Had Eyes"	3:58
11.	"I Got You" (Single Edit)	2:59
12.	"Hope"	3:42
13.	"You and Your Heart"	3:12
14.	"Rodeo Clowns"	2:36
15.	"My Mind Is for Sale"	3:59
16.	"Wasting Time"	3:50
17.	"Home"	3:02
18.	"Big Sur" (Mike D Remix)	4:16
Total length:		61:38

== Chart performance ==
The album debuted at number 68 on the Japanese Albums Chart and has remained on the chart for seven weeks.

== Charts ==
Chart (2018)	Peak position
Japanese Albums (Oricon)	68

== Release history ==
Region	Date	Format	Label	Ref.
Japan	July 4, 2018	Digital download	Universal Music Japan	
Japan	July 4, 2018	CD	Universal Music Japan	
