= Drink the Water =

Song by Jack Johnson

from the album Brushfire Fairytales
- Released: February 1, 2001
- Recorded: 2000–2001
- Genre: Rock
- Length: 3:21
- Label: Universal
- Songwriter: Jack Johnson
- Producer: J. P. Plunier

"Drink the Water" is a song recorded by Jack Johnson on the album Brushfire Fairytales released on February 1, 2001, under the Universal label.

The song was inspired by a surfing accident where Jack Johnson wiped out and nearly drowned after hitting an underwater reef on a fall and cutting his head.

== Personnel ==
- Jack Johnson–vocals, guitars
- Adam Topol–drums
- Merlo Podlewski–bass guitar
