= One Step Ahead =

One Step Ahead may refer to:

- "One Step Ahead" (Aretha Franklin song), 1965
- "One Step Ahead" (Split Enz song), 1980
- "One Step Ahead" (Nik Kershaw song), 1989
- "One Step Ahead" (Debbie Gibson song), 1990
- "One Step Ahead" (Jack Johnson song), 2022
