= Kristal Ambrose =

Bahamian marine biologist and environmental activist

- Citizenship: Bahamian
- Education: Gannon University (BA); Dalhousie University (MS)
- Occupations: Marine biologist, environmental activist
- Awards: Environmental Youth Leader Award (2014); Goldman Environmental Prize (2020)
- Website: https://www.kristalambrose.com

Kristal Ambrose is a Bahamian marine biologist and environmental activist. In 2013, she founded the Bahamas Plastic Movement, a nonprofit organization dedicated to reducing plastic pollution. She was awarded the 2020 Goldman Environmental Prize for her work in convincing the Bahamian government to ban single-use plastics, including common disposable items like bags, straws, and containers.

== Early life and education ==
Ambrose's passion for conserving marine life began due to experiences she had in her early life. She would go swimming every day with her father and later worked at an aquarium. Ambrose studied Fisheries Management and Aquaculture at Hocking College and holds a Bachelor of Arts from Gannon University. She also has a Master of Science in Marine Affairs from Dalhousie University. Ambrose began studying for a Doctor of Philosophy at the World Maritime University in 2020. Her doctoral thesis is entitled "Contextual Barriers Facing Caribbean SIDS in the Global Governance of Plastic Pollution: Assessing the need for harmonised marine debris monitoring and contextual equity to support participation in the global plastics treaty negotiations by Caribbean SIDS".

== Activism and research ==
In 2013, Ambrose began working on a citizen science initiative called the Plastic Beach Project, studying the amount of plastic on beaches. In 2014, she started a summer camp to educate young people about plastic pollution. Alongside the Plastic Pollution Education and Ocean Conservation Camp, Ambrose also runs a Junior Plastic Warriors Environmental Program. Ambrose is the founder of the Bahamas Plastic Movement, a nonprofit organization dedicated to reducing plastic pollution.

In April 2018, Ambrose successfully convinced the government of the Bahamas to ban single-use plastic bags, straws, cutlery, and expanded polystyrene cups and containers. The nationwide ban came into effect in January 2020. She gained international recognition for her efforts to combat plastic pollution in the Bahamas, culminating in her receipt of the Goldman Environmental Prize in 2020. Ambrose's initiatives have notably engaged local youth in environmental advocacy.

== Awards ==
- 2014 Environmental Youth Leader Award (from the Government of the Bahamas)
- 2020 Goldman Environmental Prize (for grassroots environmentalists)
