= Sunsets for Somebody Else =

Single by Jack Johnson

from the album All the Light Above It Too
- Released: August 3, 2017
- Recorded: 2016
- Studio: Mango Tree Studio
- Genre: Rock, alternative rock
- Length: 3:30
- Label: Brushfire
- Songwriter: Jack Johnson
- Producer: Robbie Lackritz

Jack Johnson singles chronology
"My Mind Is for Sale" (2017)	"Sunsets for Somebody Else" (2017)	"You Can't Control It" (2017)

"Sunsets for Somebody Else" is a song by American singer-songwriter Jack Johnson. The song is the second single from the album All the Light Above It Too, and was released on August 3, 2017. The song currently has over 50 million streams on Spotify.

== Composition ==
Johnson wrote this song while he was on a surf trip in Micronesia, and says "Something about being on boats always pulls songs out of me." Billboard says that Johnson's lines such as, "You tell yourself just to turn away/but you know you've already lost" and "I know I've seen that vacant stare/selling sunsets for somebody else" have a soothing tinge unlike other Johnson songs. Other lines such as "You find yourself looking up at night, from the bottom of the earth" are supposed to capture the listener, and make them feel like they are on a beach on a hot summer day. The recording displays a very big instrumentation of the music he recorded that launched his career in 1999. The song is one of three songs to be released prior to the album, along with "My Mind Is for Sale", and "You Can't Control It".

== Release ==
The song was first released exclusively through Billboard in the morning of August 3, 2017, but later in the day was available for download on iTunes, and to all who pre-ordered the album. On the same day, an audio video was also uploaded on Johnson's Vevo channel. A CD single for the song was released on August 17, 2017.

== Track listing ==
CD single

1. "Sunsets for Somebody Else" – 3:30

== Charts ==
Chart (2017)	Peak position
US Rock Digital Song Sales (Billboard)	20

== Certifications ==
Certifications for "Sunsets for Somebody Else"
Region	Certification	Certified units/sales
Australia (ARIA)	Gold	35,000^{‡}
Brazil (Pro-Música Brasil)	Gold	30,000^{‡}
Canada (Music Canada)	Gold	40,000^{‡}
New Zealand (RMNZ)	Gold	15,000^{‡}
^{‡} Sales+streaming figures based on certification alone.
