= Colorado (Milky Chance song) =

2021 single by Milky Chance

Single by Milky Chance

from the album Trip Tape
- Released: 18 June 2021
- Genre: Indie rock
- Length: 2:54
- Label: Muggelig
- Songwriters: Clemens Rehbein; Joacim Bo Persson; Philipp Maximilian Dausch; Sebastian Arman
- Producers: Milky Chance; Decco

Milky Chance singles chronology
"Don't Let Me Down" (2020)	"Colorado" (2021)

Music video
- "Colorado" on YouTube

"Colorado" is a song by German folk rock band Milky Chance. It was released on 18 June 2021 as a single from the band's debut compilation album Trip Tape. The band's members Clemens Rehbein and Philipp Maximilian Dausch wrote the song with Joacim Bo Persson and Sebastian Arman, and produced it with Decco.

== Content ==
The band's vocalist and guitarist Clemens Rehbein told American Songwriter: "It's about consuming and compensating and being destructive or being weak for a moment, We all need it sometimes, but we also know it probably doesn’t bring us anywhere in the long run. This is what the song is about not to forget—with a little wink in the end. It's very honest but also not taking itself too seriously at the same time. We feel like that's a very realistic and maybe healthy way to look at this life we're all in". Wonderland magazine described "Colorado" as "a vibrant, up-tempo tune about the uneasiness of failed relationships, and horse tranquiliser".

== Music video ==
The music video was released on 18 June 2021, and directed by Vincent Sylvain. It was filmed at "a visibly striking but faded hotel", with scenes set in the late 1970s. The band members play both employees and guests "engaged in strange, questionable, and hallucinatory practices". They end up in room 420, where they are "surrounded by swan-shaped towels, the[n] strum, sing, and fall into a trance".

== Credits and personnel ==
Credits adapted from Tidal.

- Decco– producer
- Milky Chance – producer
- Clemens Rehbein – composer
- Joacim Bo Persson – composer
- Philipp Maximilian Dausch – composer
- Sebastian Arman – composer

== Charts ==
=== Weekly charts ===
Chart performance for "Colorado"
Chart (2021–2022)	Peak position
Austria (Ö3 Austria Top 40)	18
Canada Rock (Billboard)	8
Germany (GfK)	28
New Zealand (Recorded Music NZ)	36
Slovakia Airplay (ČNS IFPI)	10
Switzerland (Schweizer Hitparade)	83
US Hot Rock & Alternative Songs (Billboard)	26
US Rock & Alternative Airplay (Billboard)	4

=== Year-end charts ===
Year-end chart performance for "Colorado"
Chart (2021)	Position
Austria (Ö3 Austria Top 40)	64
Germany (Official German Charts)	70

== Certifications ==
Certifications and sales for "Colorado"
Region	Certification	Certified units/sales
Austria (IFPI Austria)	Platinum	30,000^{‡}
Canada (Music Canada)	Gold	40,000^{‡}
Germany (BVMI)	Gold	200,000^{‡}
^{‡} Sales+streaming figures based on certification alone.

== Release history ==
Release history for "Colorado"
Region	Date	Format	Label	Ref.
Various	18 June 2021	Digital download; streaming	Muggelig	
United States	29 June 2021	Alternative radio	Muggelig	
