= Big Sur (Jack Johnson song) =

Song performed by Jack Johnson

Single by Jack Johnson

from the album All the Light Above It Too
- B-side: "Big Sur (Demo)"
- Released: September 18, 2017
- Recorded: 2016
- Studio: The Mango Tree
- Genre: Rock, pop, surf rock
- Length: 2:52
- Label: Brushfire, Columbia; Republic
- Songwriter: Jack Johnson
- Producer: Robbie Lackritz

Jack Johnson singles chronology
"You Can't Control It" (2017)	"Big Sur" (2017)	"Willie Got Me Stoned" (2018)

Music video
- "Big Sur" on YouTube

"Big Sur" is the fourth single by American musician Jack Johnson, and is featured on his 2017 studio album All the Light Above It Too. It was released as a single on September 18, 2017.

== Release ==
The single was announced with its release on a live stream with Zane Lowe on Beats 1 on September 7, 2017. On the podcast, it was also announced that a CD Single of the song would be released which would feature a remix of the song by ex Beastie Boy Mike D. The song's remix premiered on episode 31 of Mike's show "The Echo Chamber" on September 14, 2017. The song was released with a live video of Jack performing the song on Jimmy Kimmel Live!

== Composition ==
The song was written by Johnson for his wife Kim, which is his 15th love song to her. The song is not only a love song to Kim, but a song that is made to make you focus on other things other than the first five songs talked about. The first five songs talked about issues such as pollution, Climate change, and politics. The song describes fun times surfing and at the beach, and was written while Johnson was on a surfing trip. Johnson described the full meaning of the song on an interview at CNN and said "driving away from all those things that can load up on your mind and weigh heavy on you. Big Sur is about escaping all of that. In the song, I refer to the lines of the road driving up — but it's also the lines of society that confine us. Big Sur is one of those places for me where you can find freedom."

== Recording ==
The song was recorded at Jack Johnson's studio called "The Mango Tree" in Hawaii just after the 2016 United States presidential election. It was produced by long time companion Robbie Lackritz, and was a mostly pure song with little to no post production.

== Live performance ==
Jack Johnson performed the song live on Jimmy Kimmel Live! on September 9, 2017. The song was played prior to the album release several times during Jack's All the Light Above It Too Tour, and has been played a total of 12 times in concerts.

== Music video ==
A music video for the song which featured footage of one of Jack's surfing trips was released on his Vevo channel on December 18, 2017.

== Track listing ==
=== Digital download ===
1. "Big Sur" - 2:52
2. "Big Sur (Remix) ft. Mike D - 4:16

== Charts ==
Chart (2018)	Peak position
US Adult Alternative Airplay (Billboard)	22

== Release history ==
List of regions, release dates, showing formats, label, and references
Region	Date	Format(s)	Label	Ref.
Various	September 18, 2018	Contemporary Hit	Brushfire Records	

== Mike D Remix ==
"Big Sur Mike D Remix"

Single by Jack Johnson featuring Mike D

from the album Jack Johnson: The Essentials
- Released: July 4, 2018
- Recorded: 2016–17
- Studio: The Mango Tree
- Genre: Rock, pop, surf rock
- Length: 4:16
- Label: Brushfire; Columbia; Republic
- Songwriter: Jack Johnson
- Producer: Robbie Lackritz

Jack Johnson singles chronology
"Willie Got Me Stoned" (2018)	"Big Sur (Remix)" (2018)	"Don't Let Me Down" (2020)

Mike D singles chronology
"Action" (2016)	"Big Sur" (2018)

On September 7, 2018 Mike D announced on his Beats 1 radio show "The Echo Chamber," that he had just finished. On September 18, 2018 the song was released on the "Big Sur" radio promo CD, but wasn't released to the public. On July 4, 2018 the song was released on Johnson's greatest hits album, Jack Johnson: The Essentials. The song peaked at number 272 on the Oricon Singles Chart. The song was released in Japan only, and has yet to be released to the rest of the world. Each purchase of the Jack Johnson at the Fuji Rock Festival 2018 came with a free download of the remix, and a metal reusable water bottle. The show was a part of his Asian leg of his "All the Light Above it Too World Tour."

=== Track listing ===
Digital download
No.	Title	Length
1.	"Big Sur" (Mike D Remix)	4:16
Total length:		4:16
