= Meet the Moonlight =

Studio album by Jack Johnson
- Released: June 24, 2022
- Studio: The Mango Tree; EastWest; Sound City
- Genre: Rock
- Length: 35:26
- Label: Brushfire; Republic
- Producer: Blake Mills

Jack Johnson chronology
The Essentials (2018)	Meet the Moonlight (2022)

Singles from Meet the Moonlight
- 1. "One Step Ahead" Released: April 8, 2022; 2. "Don't Look Now" Released: August 22, 2022

Professional ratings
Review scores
Source	Rating
All Music	4/5 stars
Evening Standard	4/5 stars
Pitchfork	7.2/10

Meet the Moonlight is the eighth studio album by American musician Jack Johnson. The album was released on June 24, 2022, and marks Johnson's first release in five years. Johnson worked with producer Blake Mills on the album, and released the lead single, "One Step Ahead", on April 8, 2022.

== Production ==
Johnson worked on this album with producer Blake Mills, who had previously worked with Alabama Shakes and Fiona Apple. In an article with Rolling Stone, Johnson was asked how he connected with Mills, he stated, "When Blake and I first got in touch we'd send each other playlists, and over time we realized we were drawn to music that sounds effortless despite all the effort put into making it. After a while we got a language together and I gained a trust in him that allowed me to let go, push outside my comfort zone, and get to a sound I really loved."

== Recording ==
The album was recorded at The Mango Tree, Jack's home studio, and at EastWest Studios and Sound City Studios in Los Angeles. In an interview with Kyle Meredith from Consequence of Sound, Johnson stated that most of the album was recorded by Johnson and Mills themselves, and his band of Zach Gill, Merlo Podleweski and Adam Topol added finishing touches. Johnson praised Mills for his guitar playing, and stated that he is one of the greatest guitar players of all time in an interview with Zane Lowe.

== Commercial performance ==
The album performed poorly in many nations compared to previous Jack Johnson releases. The album debuted on the Billboard 200 at number 47 with 13,787 units sold, 10,292 being pure album sales. It is his first studio album not to reach the top 10 since 2001's Brushfire Fairytales. The album also reached number 70 in Australia, ending his streak of 7 straight top 5 albums.

== Tour ==
On June 21, 2022, Jack Johnson embarked on a 35-stop tour of the United States to promote the album, titled the Meet the Moonlight Tour. The tour began at the Bank of New Hampshire Pavilion in Gilford, New Hampshire and visited major cities across the United States (including Hawaii) and Canada. On the tour, Jack Johnson was joined on various dates by artists such as Ziggy Marley, Ben Harper, and Durand Jones & The Indications. In November, Johnson toured the album in Australia and New Zealand, accompanied by Ziggy Alberts, Emily Wurramara, and The Black Seeds.

== Track listing ==
All tracks are written by Jack Johnson; "Any Wonder" co-written by Blake Mills.

No.	Title	Length
1.	"Open Mind"	3:33
2.	"3AM Radio"	3:16
3.	"Calm Down"	3:15
4.	"One Step Ahead"	3:11
5.	"Meet the Moonlight"	5:05
6.	"Don't Look Now"	3:30
7.	"Costume Party"	3:29
8.	"I Tend to Digress"	2:23
9.	"Windblown Eyes"	4:08
10.	"Any Wonder"	3:36
Total length:		35:26

== Personnel ==
- Jack Johnson – vocals, bass, bottles, drums, guitar, percussion, slide guitar, ukulele
- Blake Mills – production, mixing, bass, drums, guitar, organ, percussion, slide guitar (all tracks); background vocals (1)
- Joseph Lorge – mixing, engineering
- Patricia Sullivan – mastering
- Zach Gill – melodica (1), piano (5–7), background vocals (6), organ (7)
- Merlo Podlewski – vibraphone (1), percussion (3)
- Adam Topol – drums (4), percussion (4, 6)

== Charts ==
Chart performance for Meet the Moonlight
Chart (2022)	Peak position
Australian Albums (ARIA)	70
Austrian Albums (Ö3 Austria)	58
Canadian Albums (Billboard)	84
German Albums (Offizielle Top 100)	45
Japanese Hot Albums (Billboard Japan)	58
Swiss Albums (Schweizer Hitparade)	11
UK Album Downloads (OCC)	36
US Billboard 200	47
US Top Rock Albums (Billboard)	10
