= At or with Me =

Single by Jack Johnson

from the album To the Sea
- Released: September 2010
- Genre: Pop rock; folk rock; alternative rock; acoustic rock
- Length: 3:58
- Label: Brushfire, Universal
- Songwriter: Jack Johnson

Jack Johnson singles chronology
"You and Your Heart" (2010)	"At or with Me" (2010)	"From the Clouds" (2011)

"At or with Me" is a song by American singer-songwriter Jack Johnson, released as the second single from his fifth studio album To the Sea.

== Music video ==
The song's music video features Johnson alongside comedian Andy Samberg. The video takes place at a "secret show" of Johnson's, which Samberg attends. Samberg remarks of Johnson being "the fucking mellow man," a reference to the SNL skit of which Samberg plays a parody of Johnson. Johnson then notices Samberg's presence, and asks one of his bandmates if he is "that guy from Saturday Night Live who makes fun of me." He replies affirmatively, and Johnson proceeds to perform the song, using its lyrics to seemingly address Samberg. As he performs, Samberg continues to make derogatory remarks and actions about Johnson. This eventually leads to Johnson briefly stopping the song, jumping off stage and onto Samberg. Johnson continues singing the song as he and Samberg fight with each other. Eventually, Johnson knocks Samberg down onto a road, and Samberg is hit by a car. Johnson helps him up, and the two apparently make amends. Johnson gets back on stage and continues the rest of the song. However, as he finishes the song, Samberg takes a chair and knocks Johnson out and off the stage. Samberg proclaims "Hacky sack that, motherfucker!" to Johnson as he walks off the stage.

Prior to the release of the video, people could "bet" on either Samberg or Johnson winning the fight by clicking a Facebook "like" button designated for the person of choice.

== Track listing ==
CD single

1. "At or with Me" - 3:58

== Chart performance ==
Chart (2010)	Peak position
US Adult Alternative Airplay (Billboard)	1
US Hot Rock & Alternative Songs (Billboard)	36
