= Fragments (song) =

Single by Jack Johnson

from the album "Smog of the Sea"/"All the Light Above It Too"
- Released: February 17, 2017
- Recorded: 2015
- Studio: Mango Tree Studio
- Genre: Rock, pop
- Length: Single Version: 3:42 Documentary Version: 3:32 Album Version: 3:41
- Label: Brushfire, Columbia
- Songwriter: Jack Johnson
- Producer: Robbie Lackritz

Jack Johnson singles chronology
"Shot Reverse Shot" (2013)	"Fragments" (2017)	""My Mind Is for Sale" (2017)"

"Fragments" is a song by the American singer Jack Johnson, released on February 17, 2017. The song is featured in the short film "Smog of the Sea," and is also the tenth track on Jack's seventh studio album, All the Light Above It Too.

== Release ==
The song was released on February 17, 2017, along with the release of the short film documentary, "Smog of the Sea." The song is featured in this film which chronicles a one-week journey through the Sargasso Sea. Along with the song's release, Jack announced his 2017 Tour, and plans to release a new album in the summer.

== Composition ==
Johnson says that he wrote the song about ocean pollution, and that the "Smog of the Sea" documentary inspired him to do so. The song's main message is to be mindful of our impact on the environment. The trip also inspired many other songs on his album "All the Light Above it Too." By the end of the trip, Johnson had almost completed all the songs and was ready to record them.

== Live performance ==
The song has been performed during Jack's "All the Light Above it Too Tour" multiple times, along with "My Mind Is for Sale."
