= In the Morning (Jack Johnson song) =

Single by Jack Johnson featuring Paula Fuga & John Cruz

from the album This Warm December: A Brushfire Holiday Vol. 2
- Released: November 1, 2011
- Recorded: 2011
- Studio: The Mango Tree
- Genre: Rock
- Length: 3:13
- Label: Brushfire
- Songwriter: Jack Johnson

Jack Johnson featuring Paula Fuga & John Cruz singles chronology
"From the Clouds" (2011)	"In the Morning" (2011)	"I Got You" (2013)

"In the Morning" is a song by American musician Jack Johnson from This Warm December: A Brushfire Holiday Vol. 2. The song was released on November 1, 2011 and features Paula Fuga, and John Cruz.

== Composition ==
When writing the song, Johnson wanted to capture the excitement of Christmas morning such as “laughing in their sleep / And swimming through dreams into the morning.” In the song, it also references Ebeneezer Scrooge when Johnson says "No!Bah! Humbug!”

== Release ==
The song was released as a CD and digital single on November 1, 2011, which was fifteen days before the album release on November 15. 25% of all the proceeds were donated to charities such as Little Kids Rock and Silverlake Conservatory which all support kids. On November 27, 2017, a version of the song was released on Spotify called "In The Morning 2017."

== Music video ==
A music video for the song was released on Surfline's YouTube channel on December 11, 2011. The music video features Jack, Paula Fuga, and John Cruz performing the song acoustically on the North Shore of Oahu Island. The video has currently spawned over 2.3 million views on Youtube.

== Charts ==
Chart (2011–12)	Peak position
Belgium Singles Chart (Ultratop)	140
US Adult Alternative Airplay (Billboard)	29
US Bubbling Under Hot 100 (Billboard)	6
US Holiday Digital (Billboard)	4
US Rock Digital (Billboard)	9
