= Willie Got Me Stoned =

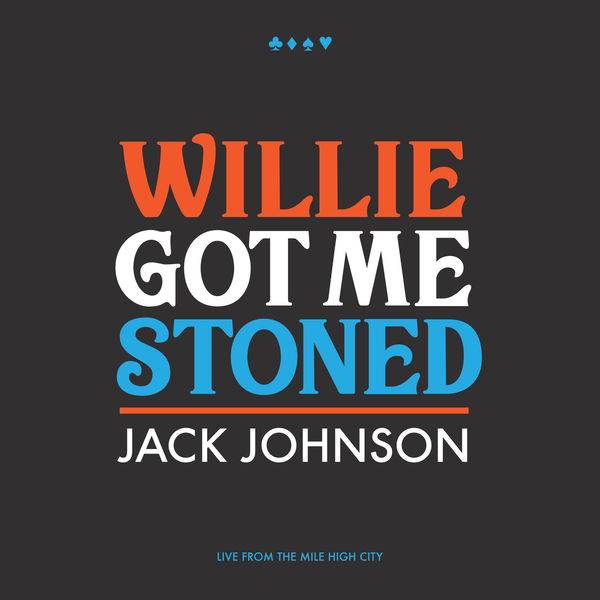

Single by Jack Johnson

from the album All the Light Above It Too
- Released: April 20, 2018
- Recorded: June 13, 2017
- Venue: Fiddler's Green Amphitheatre
- Genre: Rock; country
- Length: 2:23
- Label: Brushfire, Columbia
- Songwriter(s): Jack Hody Johnson

Jack Johnson singles chronology
"Big Sur" (2017)	"Willie Got Me Stoned" (2018)	"Big Sur (Remix)" (2018)

"Willie Got Me Stoned" (also sometimes referred as "Willie Got Me Stoned and Stole All of My Money") is a song by American musician Jack Johnson from the deluxe edition of the 2017 album All the Light Above It Too. The song was released on April 20, 2018, and was the fifth single from the album.

== Composition ==
Jack Johnson wrote the song as a tribute to the country singer Willie Nelson. Johnson said that "a great song is just three chords and the truth." He also said that it was a "real honor" to just spend a night with Nelson. Johnson refers to the night which he played poker with Nelson, and he lost consciousness, lost pride, and all hope when he got stoned with Nelson. During that night the two men also went out and smoked pot together. Johnson originally composed the song before Farm Aid 2015 in Saratoga Springs when he performed the song off of a sheet of paper he wrote on. Then the title of the song was "Willie Got Me Stoned and Stole All of My Money."

== Recording ==
The song was recorded in the summer of 2017 at the 11th show of his All the Light Above it Too World Tour in Fiddler's Green Amphitheatre.

== Live performance ==
Johnson performed the song during his All the Light Above It Too World Tour, and during Farm Aid 2015. He has performed the song 29 times in total.

== Personnel ==
Adapted from Jack Johnson's website.

- Jack Johnson – lead vocals, guitar, and ukulele
- Zach Gill – accordion, piano, harmonica, and backing vocals
- Adam Topol – drums and percussion
- Merlo Podlewski – bass guitar, guitar, and backing vocals
