= From the Clouds =

Single by Jack Johnson

from the album To the Sea
- Released: February 28, 2011
- Recorded: 2009
- Studio: Mango Tree Studio
- Genre: Rock, pop rock
- Length: 3:05
- Label: Brushfire, Columbia
- Songwriter(s): Jack Hody Johnson
- Producer(s): Jack Johnson; Merlo Podlewski; Zach Gill; Adam Topol

Jack Johnson singles chronology
"At or With Me" (2010)	"From the Clouds" (2011)	"In the Morning" (2011)

"From the Clouds" is a song by American singer Jack Johnson from his 2010 album, To the Sea. It was released on February 28, 2011, and was the final single from the album.

== Composition ==
Johnson wanted to have a track on his album by which he played both the acoustic, and electric guitar at the same time.

== Release ==
The song was released as a CD single on February 28, 2011.

== Music video ==
The official music video for the song was shot at an Olympic diving pool in Mission Viejo, California, and directed by Emmett Malloy. The video was shot by filming Johnson jump off a 40-foot diving board into the water while he sung to the song at 6,500 frames per second. The video was originally supposed to feature Johnson sky dive off of a plane with a camera man strapped to his back to film him. But Johnson felt that viewers wouldn't get the full affect if he filmed it this way. The music video was released on Johnson's vevo channel on March 1, 2011, and currently has over 1.5 million views on YouTube.

== Live performances ==
Johnson performed the song a total of 21 times during his 2010 To the SeaWorld Tour, and performed it six times during his 2011 World Tour.

== Chart performance ==
Chart (2011)	Peak position
US Adult Alternative Songs (Billboard)	2
US Hot Rock & Alternative Songs (Billboard)	33
