= To the Sea =

Studio album by Jack Johnson
- Released: June 1, 2010
- Recorded: January 19 – February 12, 2010
- Genre: Folk rock, soft rock
- Length: 41:34
- Label: Brushfire, Universal Republic
- Producer: Jack Johnson; Merlo Podlewski; Zach Gill; Adam Topol

Jack Johnson chronology
En Concert (2009)	To the Sea (2010)	Jack Johnson and Friends - Best of Kokua Festival (2012)

Singles from To the Sea
- 1. "You and Your Heart" Released: April 6, 2010; 2. "At or with Me" Released: September 2010; 3. "From the Clouds" Released: February 2011

To the Sea is the fifth studio album by American singer-songwriter Jack Johnson, released on May 26, 2010, in Japan, May 31, 2010 in the United Kingdom and June 1, 2010, in the United States, through Universal Republic Records and Brushfire Music Group. The album debuted at number 1 in the United States, selling 243,000 copies in its first week.

== Background and recording ==
On January 19, 2010, Johnson and his band reported that they had entered the studio to begin work on a new album, and on February 1, the band announced that their currently untitled fifth studio album was slated for a June 1 release, to be followed by a world tour. The album was recorded over three weeks in Johnson's two solar-powered studios, The Mango Tree in Hawaii and the Solar Powered Plastic Plant in Los Angeles. To the Sea was released on Johnson's own label, Brushfire Records, with the first single, "You and Your Heart", already released on radio and iTunes.

In the album, Johnson used more instruments than before like electric guitar, organ, Wurlitzer and Mellotron. Johnson said of the album's title "I guess it's a reference to a father leading his son to the sea, with the water representing the subconscious. So it's about trying to go beneath the surface and understand yourself".

== Critical reception ==
Professional ratings
Review scores
Source	Rating
AllMusic	4/5 stars
Blare Magazine	3.5/5 stars
Entertainment Weekly	B
The Guardian	3/5 stars
The Independent	1/5 stars
NU.nl	7/10 stars
Rolling Stone	3.5/5 stars
MusicOMH	3/5 stars
Ultimate Guitar	9.3/10

At Metacritic, which assigns a normalized rating out of 100 to reviews from mainstream critics, the album received an average score of 69, based on 12 reviews, which indicates "generally favorable reviews". Stephen Thomas Erlewine from Allmusic rated it four stars and commented: "Call it the signature of a surfer so bleached by the sun that he rushes nothing, but To the Sea substitutes the sunset strum-alongs of his earliest records for a sleek daytime sheen that might glimmer too brightly for hippies but it makes for a better overall pop record." Mikael Wood from Entertainment Weekly gave a B grade and said that: "Here's another set of strummy beachside ballads from the most successful surf bum in history." The Billboard review was positive, saying that: "A natural progression from 2008 release Sleep Through the Static, the new set features more electric guitars and a brighter, full-band sound while still bringing plenty of singalong acoustic romanticism and breezy melodies." Rolling Stone was favorable, saying: "On To the Sea, the 35-year-old surfer and filmmaker is still staring down adult fears. But this time he has made an existential chill-out record that feels substantial, at times even edgy, without feeling forced."

Mike Diver from BBC Music analyzed that: "Should he ever stretch himself as a musician the results could be fascinating – think The Beach Boys before Pet Sounds, and what they felt capable of afterwards – but right now he's operating in a comfort zone that should guarantee continued commercial success." Margaret Wappler from the Los Angeles Times said: "It's the most genuine sentiment on a record from a simple but ambitious man whose real-life philanthropic and environmentally sound practices aim to soothe the world, one bro or surfer girl at a time." Caroline Sullivan from The Guardian wrote: "Johnson treads lightly with his sunniness – he just lies in a metaphorical hammock and offers nuggets of wisdom, which sound deceptively meaningful, when illuminated by his pretty guitar work." The BLARE Magazine review was positive, saying: "To the Sea shows his mindset as it's not particularly groundbreaking, but it's enough to make his down-to-earth, flip-flop-loving followers dig it. Upbeat tunes still float nearby while the honest gems that reveal his surfer heart are both depressing and warming enough to cap off that campfire with close friends at the beach."

== Tour ==
Johnson toured Australia and Europe to support the album, with a North American tour starting on July 9 in Connecticut and concluding on October 14 at the Santa Barbara Bowl in California.

== Track listing ==
All songs written and composed by Jack Johnson, except where noted.

1. "You and Your Heart" – 3:13
2. "To the Sea" – 3:30
3. "No Good with Faces" – 3:31
4. "At or With Me" – 3:58
5. "When I Look Up" – 0:58
6. "From the Clouds" – 3:05
7. "My Little Girl" – 2:21
8. "Turn Your Love" – 3:13
9. "The Upsetter" – 3:50
10. "Red Wine, Mistakes, Mythology" (lyrics: Johnson & Zach Gill, music: Johnson, Gill, Merlo Podlewski & Adam Topol) – 4:03
11. "Pictures of People Taking Pictures" – 3:20
12. "Anything but the Truth" – 2:54
13. "Only the Ocean" (lyrics: Johnson, music: Johnson, Gill, Podlewski & Topol) – 3:40

iTunes bonus track

14. "Better Together" (featuring Paula Fuga) – 4:15

Japanese bonus track

14. "What You Thought You Need" (Live from Yokohama) – 4:17

== Personnel ==
- Jack Johnson – vocals, guitar, ukulele, mellotron, percussion
- Adam Topol – drums, percussion, glockenspiel, backup vocals
- Merlo Podlewski – bass, percussion, backup vocals
- Zach Gill – piano, wurlitzer, melodica, backup vocals, percussion
- Paula Fuga – backup vocals on tracks 5, 8
- G. Love – harmonica on 4, 10
- Emmett Malloy – percussion and backup vocals on 10

The album was co-produced by Robert Carranza, Johnson, Podlewski, Gill and Topol, and engineered by Carranza.

== Charts ==
=== Weekly charts ===
Weekly chart performance for To the Sea
Chart (2010)	Peak position
Australian Albums (ARIA)	1
Austrian Albums (Ö3 Austria)	4
Belgian Albums (Ultratop Flanders)	13
Belgian Albums (Ultratop Wallonia)	11
Canadian Albums (Billboard)	1
Danish Albums (Hitlisten)	9
Dutch Albums (Album Top 100)	8
European Top 100 Albums	1
French Albums (SNEP)	18
German Albums (Offizielle Top 100)	4
Greek Albums (IFPI Greece)	10
Irish Albums (IRMA)	15
Japanese Albums (Oricon)	7
New Zealand Albums (RMNZ)	1
Norwegian Albums (VG-lista)	37
Portuguese Albums (AFP)	30
Scottish Albums (OCC)	3
Spanish Albums (PROMUSICAE)	12
Swedish Albums (Sverigetopplistan)	20
Swiss Albums (Schweizer Hitparade)	1
UK Albums (OCC)	1
US Billboard 200	1

=== Year-end charts ===
Year-end chart performance for To the Sea
Chart (2010)	Rank
Canadian Albums Chart	18
German Albums Chart	88
New Zealand Albums Chart	40
UK Albums Chart	143
US Billboard 200	33

== Certifications ==
Certifications for To the Sea
Region	Certification	Certified units/sales
Australia (ARIA)	Platinum	70,000^{^}
Canada (Music Canada)	Platinum	80,000^{^}
Germany (BVMI)	Gold	100,000^{‡}
New Zealand (RMNZ)	Gold	7,500^{^}
Switzerland (IFPI Switzerland)	Gold	15,000^{^}
United Kingdom (BPI)	Gold	100,000^{^}
United States (RIAA)	Gold	500,000^{^}
^{^} Shipments figures based on certification alone.^{‡} Sales+streaming figures based on certification alone.
