= One Step Ahead (Jack Johnson song) =

2022 single by Jack Johnson

Single by Jack Johnson

from the album Meet the Moonlight
- Released: April 8, 2022
- Studio: The Mango Tree
- Genre: Rock; Experimental
- Length: 3:11
- Label: Brushfire
- Songwriter: Jack Johnson
- Producers: Jack Johnson; Blake Mills

Jack Johnson singles chronology
"If Ever" (2021)	"One Step Ahead" (2022)

"One Step Ahead" is a song by American musician Jack Johnson. It was released on April 8, 2022, and is the lead single for his eighth studio album Meet the Moonlight.

== Production ==
Johnson worked on the song as well as the album with critically acclaimed producer and musician Blake Mills, who has worked with other artists such as Fiona Apple, Andrew Bird and Bob Dylan. When asked how Johnson connected with Mills, he stated, "When Blake and I first got in touch we’d send each other playlists, and over time we realized we were drawn to music that sounds effortless despite all the effort put into making it. After a while we got a language together and I gained a trust in him that allowed me to let go, push outside my comfort zone, and get to a sound I really loved." Most of the instruments in the song were performed by Johnson and Mills themselves, unlike Jack's previous record, All the Light Above It Too, where Johnson performed most of the instruments himself. Mixing and engineering was done by Joseph Lorge, who has worked with Mills on several projects, and with Phoebe Bridgers on her 2020 album Punisher. Recording and production for the album took place at EastWest and Sound City Studios in Los Angeles, as well as Johnson's home studio, The Mango Tree, in Hawaii.

== Composition ==
In a Rolling Stone interview, Johnson stated that the song is about how communication and how we receive information is so different nowadays with social media. The song is much heavier and includes more percussion than most other Johnson songs, however, the chorus slows down and is extremely quiet. Johnson says this represents the listener trying to find a calm realizing place to breathe through the noise.

== Release ==
Johnson began teasing a new project on April 5, 2022, when he posted on his Instagram and Facebook accounts footage of him recording a in his studio. Later that week he shared a snippet of a new track, as well as the single cover for the song. On April 8, the song was released on all digital and streaming platforms, and was sent to adult alternative radio on April 11, 2022.

== Music video ==
Two videos for the song have been released on Johnson's official YouTube. On April 8, a lyric video by Morgan Maassen, Jeff Canham, Kat Studio & Gabrielle Saydee was released. On April 29, Johnson released a live video of the song, with him using a loop pedal and playing a Gibson ES-335 guitar.

== Critical reception ==
The song was received positively upon release, and many praised his new sound compared to his previous laid back style. Far Out Magazine stated that "The track also represents a real return to form for Johnson" and rated the song a 7.1 out of 10.

== Chart performance ==
The song debuted at number 21 on Billboard's Adult Alternative Airplay chart, becoming Johnson's 26th entry on the chart. On May 28, the song reached number 7, becoming Johnson's 19th top 10 song on the chart. On July 23, 2022, it reached number one on the chart, becoming Johnson's 11th number-one song.

== Charts ==
Chart performance for "One Step Ahead"
Chart (2022)	Peak position
Japan Hot Overseas (Billboard Japan)	18
US Rock & Alternative Airplay (Billboard)	33
