= The Captain Is Drunk =

2020 song by Jack Johnson

"The Captain is Drunk"

Single by Jack Johnson
- Released: December 4, 2020
- Studio: The Mango Tree
- Genre: Rock; Folk
- Length: 3:07
- Label: Brushfire Records, Columbia
- Songwriter: Jack Johnson
- Producers: Jack Johnson; Simon Beins

Jack Johnson singles chronology
| "Don't Let Me Down" (2020) | "The Captain is Drunk" (2020) | "If Ever" (2021) |

"The Captain Is Drunk" is a song by American singer-songwriter Jack Johnson. The song was released as a single on December 4, 2020, and premiered on Rolling Stone the day before. The song was originally teased in an Instagram post by Johnson about voting in September 2020. The cover art is designed by Jeff Canham, who also made the cover for This Warm December Vol. III as well as Johnson's 2018 Santa Barbara Bowl Benefit concert for the 2018 California wildfires.

== Composition ==
Johnson was inspired to write this song by his favorite books from when he was a kid. These books were Mutiny on the Bounty, and Pitcairn's Island by Charles Nordhoff and James Norman Hall from the Men Against the Sea Trilogy. He kept thinking in his mind about the big decisions and disagreements that would occur in these stories, and comparing them to the division in our country leading up to the 2020 United States presidential election. The song is a very acoustic based, as Johnson sings the line "Hey what do I do/If the captain is drunk?", speculated to refer to then-President Donald Trump.

== Commercial performance ==
The song received 177,000 Spotify plays after one day of release, and 573,000 in its first week. Within its first week of release, it was the third most added song onto Triple A Radio without being released as a radio single.

== Personnel ==
Adapted from Tidal.

- Jack Johnson - Vocals, 12-string guitar, Acoustic guitar, slide guitar
- Simon Beins - Producer, Mixer
- Robert Carranza - Mastering Engineer, Studio personnel
- Jeff Canham - Cover art
