= Flake (song) =

2002 single by Jack Johnson

Single by Jack Johnson

from the album Brushfire Fairytales
- B-side: "It's All Understood"; "Inaudible Melodies"
- Released: February 11, 2002
- Genre: Rock
- Length: 4:43
- Label: Enjoy
- Songwriter: Jack Johnson
- Producer: J. P. Plunier

Jack Johnson singles chronology
"Flake" (2002)	"The Horizon Has Been Defeated" (2003)

Professional ratings
Review scores
Source	Rating
Billboard	12/12 stars

"Flake" is a song written and performed by American singer-songwriter Jack Johnson. It is Johnson's debut single and was released as the only single from his first album, Brushfire Fairytales (2001). "Flake" features Ben Harper on Weissenborn slide guitar and Tommy Jordan on steel drums.

"Flake" became Johnson's first entry on the US Billboard Hot 100 chart, peaking at number 73, and it topped the Billboard Triple-A chart for three weeks, becoming the best-performing song of 2002 on that listing. In New Zealand, it reached number six and ended 2003 as the country's sixth-most-successful song; it remains Johnson's sole top-10 hit there. "Flake" has become a popular song in Johnson's live performances and still garners radio airplay.

== Track listings ==
European CD single

1. "Flake" – 4:42
2. "Flake" (live) – 4:31

European maxi-CD single

1. "Flake" – 4:42
2. "Flake" (live) – 4:31
3. "It's All Understood" – 3:35
4. "Inaudible Melodies" – 3:36

Australasian CD single

1. "Flake" – 4:42
2. "Inaudible Melodies" – 3:36
3. "It's All Understood" (live) – 3:35
4. "Flake" (live) – 4:31

== Charts ==
=== Weekly charts ===
Weekly chart performance for "Flake"
Chart (2002–2003)	Peak position
New Zealand (Recorded Music NZ)	6
US Billboard Hot 100	73
US Adult Alternative Airplay (Billboard)	1
US Adult Pop Airplay (Billboard)	9
US Alternative Airplay (Billboard)	22

=== Year-end charts ===
2002 year-end chart performance for "Flake"
Chart (2002)	Position
US Adult Top 40 (Billboard)	23
US Modern Rock Tracks (Billboard)	48
US Triple-A (Billboard)	1

2003 year-end chart performance for "Flake"
Chart (2003)	Position
New Zealand (RIANZ)	6

== Certifications ==
Certifications for "Flake"
Region	Certification	Certified units/sales
Australia (ARIA)	Gold	35,000^{‡}
Canada (Music Canada)	Gold	40,000^{‡}
New Zealand (RMNZ)	Platinum	30,000^{‡}
^{‡} Sales+streaming figures based on certification alone.

== Release history ==
Release dates and formats for "Flake"
Region	Date	Format(s)	Label(s)	Ref.
United States	February 11, 2002	Alternative radio	Enjoy	
United States	May 20, 2002	Hot adult contemporary radio	Enjoy	
United States	August 26, 2002	Contemporary hit radio	Enjoy	
New Zealand	March 31, 2003	CD	Modular	
