= If Ever (Paula Fuga and Jack Johnson song) =

Single by Paula Fuga and Jack Johnson featuring Ben Harper
- Released: April 16, 2021
- Length: 3:35
- Label: Brushfire, Columbia
- Songwriters: Jack Johnson; Paula Fuga
- Producers: Jack Johnson; Simon Beins

Paula Fuga singles chronology
| "Christmas Lu'au" (2020) | "If Ever" (2021) | "Saving My Love" (2021) |

Jack Johnson singles chronology
| "The Captain Is Drunk" (2020) | "If Ever" (2021) | "One Step Ahead" (2022) |

Ben Harper singles chronology
| "Inland Empire" (2021) | "If Ever" (2021) |

"If Ever" is a song by Hawaiian singer-songwriters Paula Fuga and Jack Johnson featuring Ben Harper. The song was released on April 16, 2021, and is the lead single from Fuga's studio album Rain on Sunday, to be released via Brushfire Records. Fuga and Johnson also performed the song for Earth Day Live 2021. The song was released to Triple-A radio on April 19 in the United States.

== Composition ==
The song was written by Johnson and Fuga about their fathers, who had both died. Johnson had the melody and some of the lyrics in his head for years. Fuga then added some of her shared experiences into the song as well. Ben Harper was added and plays the lap steel guitar in the song.

== Personnel ==
Adapted from Tidal

- Paula Fuga – vocals, glockenspiel
- Jack Johnson – vocals, guitar
- Ben Harper – lap steel guitar
- Adam Topol – drums
- Brad Watanabe – bass, ukulele
- Robert Carranza – mixing
- Simon Beins – engineer

== Charts ==
Chart performance for "If Ever"
| Chart (2021) | Peak position |
|---|---|
| New Zealand Hot Singles (RMNZ) | 40 |
| US Adult Alternative Airplay (Billboard) | 24 |

== Release history ==
Release history for "If Ever"
| Region | Date | Format(s) | Label | Ref. |
|---|---|---|---|---|
| Various | April 16, 2021 | Digital download; streaming | Brushfire | |
| United States | April 19, 2021 | Adult alternative radio | Brushfire; Republic | |
