= You Can't Control It =

"You Can't Control it"

Single by Jack Johnson

from the album All the Light Above It Too
- Released: August 25, 2017
- Recorded: 2016
- Studio: Mango Tree Studio
- Length: 4:09
- Label: Brushfire, Columbia
- Songwriters: Jack Johnson; Zach Gill
- Producer: Robbie Lackritz

Jack Johnson singles chronology
"Sunsets for Somebody Else" (2017)	"You Can't Control it" (2017)	"Big Sur'" (2017)

Music video
- "You Can't Control It " on YouTube

"You Can't Control It" is a song by American musician Jack Johnson from his 2017 album All the Light Above It Too. The song was released on August 25, 2017, and is the third single from the album. The song was written about the pollution in the ocean and on beaches. The song originated from a jam that Jack played the drums in with Zach Gill in his garage. Jack then decided to play the riff for his producer Robbie Lackritz to see if it should be featured on the album. Lackritz said the drum beat sounded like "Any other 90's song." They changed the 90's drum beat to many different beats by layering them together.

== Release ==
The song's music video was released exclusively on Entertainment Weekly on August 24, 2017. The music video features a time-lapse of Johnson and volunteer workers at a beach in Hawaii collecting plastic within a 90-meter radius, and turning it into art. The art is also featured as his album cover on All the Light Above It Too. The video was then released on Johnson's Vevo channel on August 25.

== Track listing ==
CD single

1. "You Can't Control It" – 4:09
