= Jack Johnson and Friends: Best of Kokua Festival =

Jack Johnson and Friends Best of Kokua Festival

Live album by Jack Johnson
- Released: April 13, 2012 (Germany); April 17, 2012 (Worldwide)
- Recorded: Kōkua Festivals (2004–2008 & 2010)
- Genre: Acoustic rock; folk rock
- Length: 54:29 (CD); 57:47 (iTunes)
- Label: Brushfire, Universal

Jack Johnson chronology
To the Sea (2010)	Jack Johnson and Friends; Best of Kokua Festival (2012)	From Here to Now to You (2013)

Jack Johnson and Friends – Best of Kokua Festival is a live album by singer-songwriter Jack Johnson released in Germany on April 13, 2012, and worldwide on April 17, 2012. All songs on the album were recorded live during the six years (2004-8 & 2010) of Kōkua Festivals. 100% of the profits from this release will be going to fund the Kōkua Hawai'i Foundation which supports environmental, art, and music education around the world. The download of the album includes the bonus track "The 3 R's".

Jack dedicated the album to the keiki (kids) of Hawai'i.

== Track listing ==
1. "Better Together" Jack Johnson (feat. Paula Fuga) 4:24*
2. "Cry! Cry! Cry!" Ziggy Marley (feat. Jack Johnson & Paula Fuga) 4:03*
3. "A Pirate Looks at Forty" Jack Johnson & Dave Matthews (feat. Tim Reynolds) 3:52
4. "Mudfootball" Jack Johnson (feat. Ozomatli & G. Love) 3:56*
5. "Constellations" Jack Johnson (feat. Eddie Vedder & Kawika Kahiapo) 3:44*
6. "Take It Easy" Jackson Browne (feat. Jack Johnson & John Cruz) 3:59*
7. "Island Style" John Cruz (feat. Jack Johnson & Jackson Browne) 3:57*
8. "Breakdown" Jack Johnson (feat. Jake Shimabukuro) 4:13*
9. "Further On Down the Road" Taj Mahal (feat. Jack Johnson) 5:00*
10. "Welcome to Jamrock" Damian "Jr. Gong" Marley (feat. Jack Johnson & Paula Fuga) 4:17*
11. "High Tide or Low Tide" Jack Johnson & Ben Harper 5:04*
12. "Blue Eyes Crying in the Rain" Willie Nelson (feat. Jack Johnson & Ben Harper) 3:17
13. "I Shall Be Released" Eddie Vedder, Jack Johnson & Zach Gill 4:43
14. "Banana Pancakes" Jack Johnson (only iTunes, recorded at 2006 Kōkua Festival) 3:18

Bonus track available with the digital download of the album:

1. "The 3 R's" by Jack Johnson with Dave Matthews & Tim Reynolds, Paula Fuga, Mason Jennings and Go Jimmy Go live from the 2008 Kōkua Festival.

Release date: Germany, April 13, 2012 (iTunes, CD) Worldwide, April 17, 2012 (iTunes, CD)
An asterisk denotes video available on the Best of Kōkua Festival website.

== Kōkua Festival dates, venues and musicians ==
=== 2004 ===
January 3, originally planned for Turtle Bay, then moved to Kualoa Ranch, but "held" at the Blaisdell Arena.

- Amy Hanaiali'i Gilliom & Willie K, Michael Franti & Spearhead, Makana, DJ Logic

=== 2005 ===
April 13 Maui Arts and Cultural Center (A & B Amphitheater) & April 16 Waikiki Shell

- Jackson Browne, John Cruz, Ozomatli, G. Love & Special Sauce, Kawika Kahiapo, Kaukahi

Kōkua Festival 2004/2005 was a DVD released by the Jack Johnson Music website. 100% of the profits will go to the Kōkua Hawai'i Foundation. Mudfootball (Jack Johnson with G. Love and Ozomatli), Island Style (John Cruz with Jack Johnson & Jackson Browne), and Take It Easy (Jackson Browne with Jack Johnson & John Cruz) are videos on the Best of Kōkua Festival website.

=== 2006 ===
April 19 Maui Arts and Cultural Center (A & B Amphitheater) & April 22 (Earth Day) Waikiki Shell

- Willie Nelson and the Planetary Bandits, Ben Harper, Damian "Jr. Gong" Marley, Henry Kapono, Paula Fuga and the One Love 'Ohana Band, ALO

Welcome to Jamrock (Jack Johnson & Damian "Jr Gong" Marley) and High Tide or Low Tide (Ben Harper & Jack Johnson) are videos on the Best of Kōkua Festival website.

=== 2007 ===
April 21 & 22 (Earth Day) Waikiki Shell

- Eddie Vedder, Boom Gaspar, Ernie Cruz, Jr., Matt Costa, The Girlas

Constellations (Jack Johnson, Eddie Vedder, & Kawika Kahiapo) is a video on the Best of Kōkua Festival website.

=== 2008 ===
April 19 & 20 Waikiki Shell

- Dave Matthews & Tim Reynolds, Paula Fuga, Mason Jennings, Go Jimmy Go

Kōkua Festival 2008 was a 60-minute documentary directed by Emmett Malloy. MSN produced a Live Kōkua 2008 streamed over the internet.

=== 2010 ===
April 23 & 24 Waikiki Shell

- Ziggy Marley, Taj Mahal and the Hula Blues Band, Jake Shimabukuro, Anuhea

Further on Down the Road (Taj Mahal with Jack Johnson), Better Together (Jack Johnson & Paula Fuga), Breakdown (Jack Johnson with Jake Shimabukuro), and Cry, Cry, Cry (Ziggy Marley with Jack Johnson & Paula Fuga) are videos on the Best of Kōkua Festival website.

== Charts ==
Chart performance for Jack Johnson and Friends: Best of Kokua Festival
Chart (2012)	Peak position
Belgian Albums (Ultratop Flanders)	182
Canadian Albums (Billboard)	15
US Billboard 200	12
