= Don't Let Me Down (Milky Chance and Jack Johnson song) =

Single by Milky Chance and Jack Johnson
- Released: 1 May 2020
- Length: 3:20
- Label: Muggelig; Universal; BMG; Brushfire; Columbia
- Songwriter(s): Clemens Rehbein; Philipp Dausch; Jack Johnson; Tobias Kuhn
- Producer(s): Milky Chance; Tobias Kuhn; Konstantin Kersting

Milky Chance singles chronology
"Rush" (2019)	"Don't Let Me Down" (2020)	"Colorado" (2021)

Jack Johnson singles chronology
"Big Sur (Remix)" (2018)	"Don't Let Me Down" (2020)	"The Captain is Drunk" (2020)

Music video
- "Don't Let Me Down" on YouTube

"Don't Let Me Down" is a song by German folk group Milky Chance and American singer-songwriter Jack Johnson. The song was released on 1 May 2020 and the music video premiered on Milky Chance's YouTube channel. The song reached number one on the US Adult Alternative Songs chart in July 2020.

== Background ==
Milky Chance met Jack Johnson twice in 2018; when they were on tour in Switzerland, and at the Sea Her Now festival in New Jersey. The band was honoured to work with Johnson, having listened to his music since they were teenagers, and having played his music with their friends and while doing their first band projects.

== Music video ==
An animated music video for the song was released on 1 May 2020. The video was illustrated by Monja Gentschow & Jana Marei, and was animated by Felix von Liska.

== Personnel ==
Adapted from Tidal.

- Writers: Jack Johnson, Milky Chance
- Composers: Jack Johnson, Clemens Rehbein, and Philipp Dausch
- Producers: Milky Chance, Tobias Kuhn, Konstantin Kersting

== Charts ==
Chart (2020)	Peak position
Canada AC (Billboard)	46
New Zealand Hot Singles (RMNZ)	22
US Hot Rock & Alternative Songs (Billboard)	48
US Rock Airplay (Billboard)	16

=== Year end charts ===
Chart (2020)	Peak position
US Adult Alternative Songs (Billboard)	5

=== All-time charts ===
Chart (1995–2021)	Position
US Adult Alternative Songs (Billboard)	80

== Certifications ==
Certifications for "Don't Let Me Down"
Region	Certification	Certified units/sales
Brazil (Pro-Música Brasil)	Gold	20,000^{‡}
^{‡} Sales+streaming figures based on certification alone.
