= My Mind Is for Sale =

Single by Jack Johnson

from the album All the Light Above It Too
- Released: July 14, 2017
- Recorded: 2016
- Studio: Mango Tree Studio
- Genre: Rock
- Length: 3:59
- Label: Brushfire; Republic
- Songwriter: Jack Johnson
- Producer: Robbie Lackritz

Jack Johnson singles chronology
"Fragments" (2017)	"My Mind Is for Sale" (2017)	"Sunsets for Somebody Else" (2017)

Music video
- "My Mind is for Sale" on YouTube

"My Mind Is for Sale" is a song by American musician Jack Johnson. The song was released on July 14, 2017, and is the lead single for his seventh studio album, All the Light Above It Too.

== Production ==
The song, and album was produced by long time companion with Jack Johnson, Robbie Lackritz, and recorded at "Mango Tree Studio." The song and album were mostly inspired by the sayings of Donald Trump, surfing, and camping. Also, Johnson had just recently worked on the short documentary, "Smog of the Sea," and released his song "Fragments." The documentary took a one-week journey through the sea to study animals, and sea creatures. This made Johnson think about what Trump has said about pollution and global warming, and has also included this in his album.

== Meaning ==
Johnson says that the song is generally about Trump trying to put up a border wall between the United States and Mexico. The song also talks about Trump's general attitude during the election.

== Release ==
The song was released as a single on July 14, 2017, along with the pre-order of Johnson's new album. A one track CD single was released for the song along with "Sunsets for Somebody Else" on August 18, 2017. On the same day as the song's release, an Anti-Trump lyric video was released. The video had a budget of $0 and was shot using Johnson's phone using an animation app, and his son's building blocks. The video features Johnson building up walls with the blocks, and then knocking them down.

== Live performance ==
Johnson has performed the song 35 times so far during his All the Light Above it Too Tour. He has performed this song with Zach Gill, Adam Topol, and Merlo.

== Chart performance ==
"My Mind Is for Sale" debuted at number 40 on the US Hot Rock Songs chart on August 5, 2017, and stayed on for one week. It also debuted at number 25 on the Triple A chart. The song was on the Triple A on the charts for 20 weeks, and peaked at number 2. The song also peaked at number 41 on the Rock Airplay Chart, and stayed on the chart for 5 weeks.

== Charts ==
=== Weekly charts ===
Chart (2017–2018)	Peak position
Belgium (Ultratip Bubbling Under Wallonia)	28
US Hot Rock & Alternative Songs (Billboard)	40
US Rock & Alternative Airplay (Billboard)	32

=== Year-end charts ===
Chart (2017)	Position
US Adult Alternative Songs (Billboard)	14

== Certifications ==
Region	Certification	Certified units/sales
Brazil (Pro-Música Brasil)	Gold	30,000^{‡}
^{‡} Sales+streaming figures based on certification alone.
