= Brushfire Fairytales =

Studio album by Jack Johnson
- Released: February 1, 2001
- Recorded: December 2000
- Genre: Folk rock
- Length: 45:53
- Label: Everloving
- Producer: JP Plunier

Jack Johnson chronology
Brushfire Fairytales (2001)	On and On (2003)

Singles from Brushfire Fairytales
- 1. "Flake" Released: 2002; 2. "Bubble Toes" Released: 2003

Professional ratings
Review scores
Source	Rating
AllMusic	4/5 stars

Brushfire Fairytales is the debut album by American singer-songwriter Jack Johnson. It was released in 2001 through Enjoy Records, a label that was later renamed Everloving Recordings.

The album's primary musicians are Johnson (vocals/guitars/piano), Adam Topol (drums/percussion) and Merlo Podlewski (bass). It was produced by J. P. Plunier, recorded and mixed by Todd Burke, with assistant engineers Andrew Alekel & Chad Essig. It was recorded near Hollywood and Vine just north of 6400 Sunset at 1520 N Cahuenga in Los Angeles at Grandmaster Recorders (formerly Bijou Studios in Hollywood), King Sound, and mastered by Dave Collins. Guests include Tommy Jordan (steel drums on "Flake") and Ben Harper (slide guitar on "Flake"). The single "Flake" was Jack Johnson's first.

In a retrospective review by The Quietus, reviewer David Bennun credits Brushfire Fairytales with helping to popularize a strain of "sensitive [and] authentic... indie-folk" that would later lead to artists such as Ed Sheeran, Passenger, and Mumford & Sons.

== Track listing ==
All songs written by Jack Johnson.

1. "Inaudible Melodies" – 3:35
2. "Middle Man" – 3:14
3. "Posters" – 3:13
4. "Sexy Plexi" – 2:07
5. "Flake" – 4:40
6. "Bubble Toes" – 3:56
7. "Fortunate Fool" – 3:48
8. "The News" – 2:26
9. "Drink the Water" – 3:21
10. "Mudfootball" (for Moe Lerner) – 3:03
11. "F-Stop Blues" – 3:10
12. "Losing Hope" – 3:52
13. "It's All Understood" – 5:28

Japan bonus track

14. "Inaudible Melodies" (live) – 3:27

UK bonus tracks

14. "Flake" (live) – 4:29
15. "Inaudible Melodies" (live) – 3:27

== Personnel ==
- Jack Johnson – vocals, guitars, piano on "It's All Understood"
- Adam Topol – drums, percussion
- Merlo Podlewski – bass guitar

Additional musicians

- Sam Beam – backing vocals on "It's All Understood" (uncredited on album)
- Ben Harper – slide guitar on "Flake"
- Tommy Jordan – steel drums on "Flake"
- Christopher Yeoh – mandolin

== Charts ==
=== Weekly charts ===
Chart (2001–2008)	Peak position
Australian Albums (ARIA)	13
French Albums (SNEP)	178
Irish Albums (IRMA)	39
New Zealand Albums (RMNZ)	1
UK Albums (OCC)	39
US Billboard 200	34

=== Year-end charts ===
Chart (2002)	Position
Australian Albums (ARIA)	78
Canadian Alternative Albums (Nielsen SoundScan)	85
US Billboard 200	92
Chart (2003)	Position
Australian Albums (ARIA)	41
New Zealand Albums (RMNZ)	7

== Certifications ==
Region	Certification	Certified units/sales
Australia (ARIA)	3× Platinum	210,000^{‡}
Canada (Music Canada)	2× Platinum	200,000^{‡}
New Zealand (RMNZ)	4× Platinum	60,000^{^}
United Kingdom (BPI)	Platinum	300,000^{‡}
United States (RIAA)	Platinum	1,000,000^{^}
^{^} Shipments figures based on certification alone.^{‡} Sales+streaming figures based on certification alone.
