= Paula Fuga =

American singer-songwriter

- Born: 1978 (age 46–47); Waimanalo, Hawaii
- Genres: Hawaiian; reggae; pop; folk
- Years active: 2003–present
- Website: paulafugahawaii.com

Paula Hiltrudis Fuga is a Hawaiian singer-songwriter who was born in Waimānalo, Hawaii. She has worked and performed with many artists on projects such as Jack Johnson, Ben Harper, Ziggy Marley, and Damian Marley.

== Early life ==
Fuga was born and raised in Waimānalo on the island of Oahu, Hawaii in 1978. As a child, she was orphaned and taken in by her grandparents, and found a passion for music as a young child. She unsuccessfully auditioned for American Idol in 2003, and shortly after joined a reggae band named Dubkonscious.

== Career ==
=== 2005–2007: Debut album and breakthrough ===
In 2005, Fuga was signed to PakiPika Productions and released her debut studio album Lilikoi a year later. In 2007, she won a Na Hoku Hanohano Award for "Most Promising Artist of the Year" for Lilikoi. This then led to her gaining national attention, and other prominent Hawaiian artists to take notice.

=== 2008–2017: Touring, Kokua Fest and Misery's End ===
In 2008, Jack Johnson invited Fuga to perform at select dates of his Sleep Through the Static Tour. During the tour, the two would frequently perform a new song titled "Country Road", which would later appear on Jack's En Concert album, and a studio version on Misery's End. After Johnson and Fuga performed in Los Angeles, the Daily Bruin newspaper called the performance of "Country Road" the highlight of the night. Fuga also performed at Kokua Fest that year as a part of Johnson's tour, and it was the second time that she participated in the event. In 2010, Fuga was also asked to feature on Johnson's album To the Sea, where she sang vocals on the tracks "When I Look Up", "Turn Your Love", and was featured on a live version of "Better Together". Fuga also performed at select dates of Jack Johnson's World Tour 2010.

In July 2010, Paula Fuga released an EP titled Misery's End, featuring collaborations from Jack Johnson, Ziggy Marley, and Adam Topol. The album also included "Country Road", and a recording of "High Tide or Low Tide". In 2012, Paula was featured on four tracks in the Best of Kokua Festival album. During this period Paula was also featured on many of Brushfire Records This Warm December albums, and featured on a song titled "Farewell" with Jack Johnson, Manuel García, and Silvia Tōmas. The song was featured in the documentary El Mar, Mi Alma.

=== 2018–present ===
Fuga opened for Jack Johnson in Koloa, Hawaii on his All the Light Above It Too World Tour along with Makana and Donavon Frankenreiter. In April 2020, she performed several songs at the 2020 Kokua Festival - Live From Home. In November 2020, she partnered with IHeartRadio and Island 98.5 Radio to end hunger, and raise money for the Hawaii Foodbank. At this show, one of the DJ's mocked her, and was suspended for shaming Fuga. On November 6, 2020, she released a song titled "Christmas Lu'au".

In February 2021, Fuga announced on Instagram that she had been signed to Jack Johnson's record label Brushfire Records. On April 16, she released "If Ever" featuring Jack Johnson and Ben Harper, which serve the lead single to her album Rain on Sunday.

== Discography ==
Albums

| Title | Details |
|---|---|
| Lilikoi | Released: May 9, 2006; Label: PakiPika Productions; Format: CD, digital download |
| Rain on Sunday | Released: June 25, 2021; Label: Brushfire; Format: CD, LP, digital download |

EPs

| Title | Details | Chart |
| Title | Details | US Reggae |
|---|---|---|
| Misery's End | Released: June 11, 2010; Label: PakiPika Productions; Format: CD, digital download | 10 |

Singles

| Title | Year | Peak chart positions | | | Album |
| Title | Year | US AAA | US World | NZ Hot | Album |
|---|---|---|---|---|---|
| "Lilikoi" | 2006 | — | — | — | Lilikoi |
| "Beautiful Face" | 2006 | — | 12 | — | Lilikoi |
| "Country Road" | 2008 | — | — | — | Misery's End |
| "Christmas Lu'au" | 2020 | — | — | — | Non-album single |
| "If Ever" (with Jack Johnson featuring Ben Harper) | 2021 | 24 | — | 40 | Rain on Sunday |
| "Hōkūleʻa Star Of Gladness" | 2021 | — | — | — | Rain on Sunday |
