= All the Light Above It Too =

Studio album by Jack Johnson
- Released: September 8, 2017
- Recorded: November 2016
- Studio: Mango Tree Studio
- Genres: Rock; folk rock; surf rock
- Length: 38:13
- Label: Brushfire, Republic, Universal Music
- Producer: Robbie Lackritz

Jack Johnson chronology
From Here to Now to You Live (2014)	All the Light Above It Too (2017)	The Essentials (2018)

Singles from All the Light Above It Too
- 1. "My Mind Is for Sale" Released: July 14, 2017; 2. "Sunsets for Somebody Else" Released: August 3, 2017; 3. "You Can't Control It" Released: August 25, 2017; 4. "Big Sur" Released: September 18, 2017; 5. "Willie Got Me Stoned" Released: April 20, 2018; 6. "Love Song #16" Released: September 15, 2018

All the Light Above It Too is the seventh studio album by American musician Jack Johnson. The album was released on September 8, 2017. The album's lead single, titled "My Mind Is for Sale", was released on July 14, 2017. It became the first release by Johnson since his 2013 album, From Here to Now to You.

== Composition ==
Brushfire Records originally made a deal with Johnson to release a new album every two years, which set the release date for November 2015. But Johnson did not want to write a song when he did not feel like it; he wanted to write it when it felt natural. The first song written from the album was "Fragments." The song was written during the filming of the movie The Smog of the Sea. It first started off as a small jam session between the crew, and is featured in the movie. As Johnson talked about in a Billboard podcast, he did not know that he was starting the creation of an album with this song. It was not until he wrote "Subplots" (which was also written during the filming of the movie) that he knew that an album was developing. Both of these songs were the ones that represent nature, and pollution in our environment. He also said that "Subplots" was put at the beginning of the album because it was a great thesis statement for the entire album. "My Mind Is for Sale" was one of two songs that was written about Donald Trump on the album. The song was written just after he won the election and clearly states how Trump is building walls, and putting borders around our beautiful world. The song also focuses on the immigrant ban that Trump enforced very early in his presidency. The second song about Trump, is the ninth track on the album, "Gather." The song features powerful lyrics such as "Well some of us need to gather, and others gonna have to kill. With everybody so pre-occupied, who's gonna pay the bill?" The song mainly talks about everyone focused on the United States presidential election of 2016, and how the people should gather together and stand up against making borders.

== Production ==
The album was produced by a friend of Johnson, Robbie Lackritz, and recorded at Mango Tree Studio, where he recorded most of his other albums. The album was mostly inspired by the sayings of Donald Trump, surfing, and camping. Also, Johnson had just recently worked on the short documentary, "Smog of the Sea", and released his song "Fragments". The documentary took a one-week journey through the sea to study animals, and sea creatures. This got Johnson thinking about what Trump has said about pollution and global warming, and has also included this in his album. Johnson's songs were mostly written while he was camping in the wilderness, or on boats. This was because his home studio is too quiet and you can hear your thoughts when you are trying to write, which makes it not such a productive writing place. "I wrote these songs when I was out of [cellular] reception and phones can't ring, there's not a lot else to do, so we play a lot of guitar," Johnson says. On these camping and boat trips, Johnson brought his backpack with a ukulele in it and with an acoustic guitar. When Jack wrote the album, he made it feature a more groovy style similar to his 2008 album Sleep Through the Static. Johnson originally did not originally have a plan with Brushfire Records to make the record, but decided to make a record by himself. He hopes that the album makes people feel good about such a beautiful world, and to come clean about how we feel.

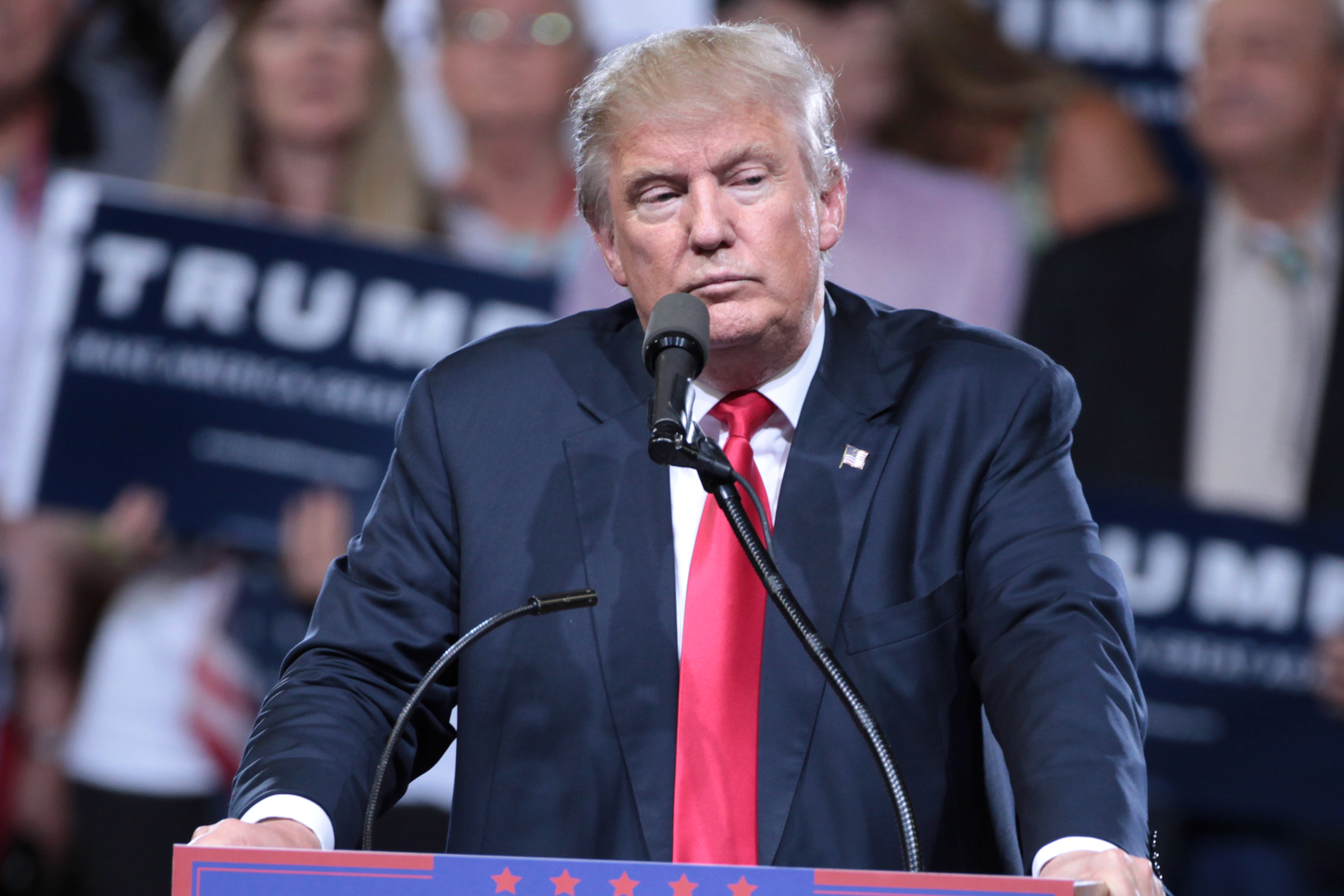
Much of the album, including the hit song "My Mind Is for Sale," is about Donald Trump. Johnson held a negative view about the candidate.

The first track of the album called "Subplots" is the introduction to the album which states that all of the other tracks supplement that one which collages all the songs together. A segment on the song was released on "Outside Online" as a podcast which plays the lines "And all the light up to the sun, and all the light above it too is gunna rise and shine." This states that no matter how bad things get, we will always have nature to believe in, love, and cherish. And how the sun just doesn't shine up, but everywhere and to others. The album then goes on to tell a large story in chronological order. The first four songs of the album are all socially political songs, and once you reach "Big Sur" you get happy, because it is a happy place to go on vacation. Most of the first four songs are written about current events in the news, which was very predictable coming from Johnson. This is because many of his past songs have been about the news, including "The News", "Cookie Jar", and "Good People". In this case the songs give hints about Trump's quote "fake news". On the "Outside Online" podcast, Johnson also explained that he has a rule that he has to have a song to express his love with his wife Kim on every album. On this album, that song is "Love Song #16". "Gather" is a later song on the album that talks about people standing up against Trump. The song features a more pop and melodic groove, while Johnson decided to add in several instrumental percussion noises. "Gather" is one of the few songs off of the album to truly go through full post-production, and the style is similar to Beck's album Mellow Gold.

== Development ==
The idea of the title of the album came from the first song that was recorded on the album called "Subplots". Johnson says that there is so much trouble in the world now with pollution and how a reality tv host became the president of the US, but that there is a beautiful world to appreciate. He decided to name the album All the Light Above it Too because it refers to the sun and how it shines in all directions during the day. Few of the songs went through post-production, which means that most of the songs are pure. Some of the songs that did go through post production are "My Mind Is for Sale", "Sunsets for Somebody Else", and "Gather".

== Recording ==
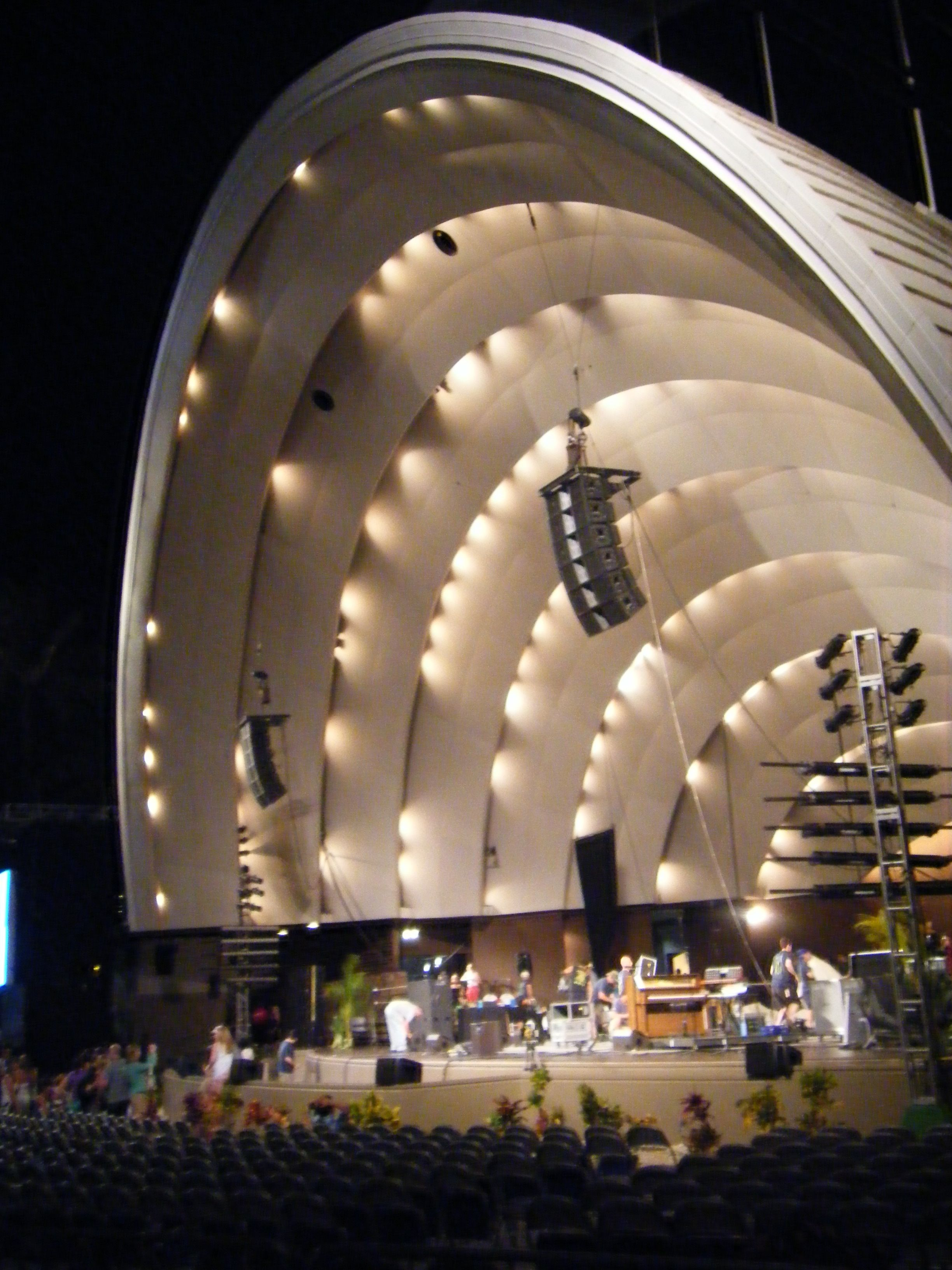
Johnson performing "My Mind Is for Sale" at the Waikiki Shell on August 5, 2017

The album was recorded at "Mango Tree Studio" in Hawaii just after the election. Johnson first usually makes sketches of the songs and then records them, but this time the sketches were the final songs. Robbie Lackritz was in the studio during the recording and added that few edits were made to the songs, and that they were mostly pure. Jack's regular band helped him record this album, but only on a few tracks. The band features Adam Topol, Zach Gill, and Merlo Podlewski. Johnson recorded the album during a particularly good surfing season, so he could not concentrate when he was recording because of all his friends texting him about the waves. This made the recording of the album take a lot more time. Johnson played all of the instruments for the demos of the album, but at first was just recording these songs with a friend. At first when he started to record the album, he didn't realize that it was actually going to become an album. After he realized it, he decided to call in his three bandmates to record some of the parts because they could play the instruments better. The equipment that Johnson used to record the album is far from fancy. Jack used his old Mathushek piano that was seen in the "My Mind is For Sale" lyric video. According to Johnson, he bought the piano for $99 at a Salvation Army as a Valentine's Day present for his then girlfriend Kim. Johnson also used the voice memos app, and an old Cassette recorder to record him singing. Most of the guitar recording was done using Jack's first-ever guitar that he got when he was 13, which was the Guild Acoustic Guitar. The rest was recorded using an Epiphone Les Paul. Johnson first recorded the songs Voice Memo app on his iPhone 7, and originally performed with all of the instruments played by him. Before Johnson would choose which songs to put on the album, he decided to play them to some of hs friends including Robbie Lackritz. One song, "My Mind is For Sale" got mixed reviews and he knew that this would be a great song to add onto the album. Instead of Johnson playing all of the instruments on the album, he thought that it would be more appropriate if he got his old bandmates to play some of the instruments. The only two songs on the album to feature an electric guitar were "Subplots" and "You Can't Control it."

== Release ==
Johnson originally planned to release the album in June 2017, along with the start of the tour, but in the event, it was delayed when Johnson's friend Kelly Slater invited him surfing in the Marshall Islands. This nearly caused Johnson to cancel the album release entirely. It was eventually released on September 8, 2017. Johnson extended his US and South America tour dates, and set up pre-ordering for his new album on his website, with pre-orders for the vinyl or CD versions of the album available. He also set up a Digital & Lithograph bundle, in which the first 500 will be signed. In Australia, anyone who pre-orders a CD copy of the album automatically gets an entry to win a signed Epiphone Pro-1 Ultra Acoustic/ Electric Guitar. Anyone that purchased a ticket to his All the Light Above It Too Tour received a code that enabled them to receive a free physical copy of the album. "Outside Online" is doing a pre-order of the album that features one extra song called "Single-Use Plastic," which he has performed before in lunch cafeteria's, and at plastic free benefits. The album was released with a 22-page built in booklet, and dedicated to Ben Beverly. The paper used for the cd is 100% recycled paper, and a portion of the proceeds go to One Percent for the Planet. Johnson says that he does not care if his album didn't make it to number 1 on the Billboard 200, but would be happy if it did. If the album did debut at no. 1, it would be his fifth consecutive album to and he would tie for third place for Most consecutive albums to debut at number-one, along with U2, Madonna, and Disturbed.

== Singles ==
In February 2017, Johnson released a new song "Fragments" to accompany the Smog of the Sea film. Along with the release of "Fragments", Johnson also teased an album release, and announced his 2017 Summer Tour. The first single of the album, "My Mind Is for Sale" was released on July 14, 2017. Johnson said the video cost zero dollars to make, and used his phone and sons' blocks to make the video. Along with the video release, Johnson announced his new album to come out on September 8, 2017, on his Instagram. "My Mind is For Sale" peaked at number 40 on the US Billboard Hot Rock Songs and number 2 on the US Adult Alternative chart. The second single, "Sunsets For Somebody Else" was released on August 3, 2017. The third single of the album, "You Can't Control It" was released on August 25, 2017, with a music video to accompany it. A limited edition 10" vinyl EP for "You Can't Control It" was released by Republic Records in Peru to help support Johnson's show at the Jockey Club del Perú, and in select stores in the US. The EP contains a live track of "My Mind Is for Sale", "I Wrote Mr. Tambourine Man", "Sunsets for Somebody Else", "Mudfootball", and "You Can't Control It". Johnson announced that his next single from the album would be "Big Sur" which he announced when performing on Jimmy Kimmel Live! on September 9, 2017. "Big Sur" was released as the fourth single from the album on September 18, 2017, and feature a remix of the song by Mike D from the Beastie Boys. On April 20, 2018 "Willie Got Me Stoned" was released as the fifth single from the deluxe edition of the album. "Love Song #16" will be released as the sixth single from the album, and it is set to be released for radio promotion on September 15, 2018.

== Album cover ==
The album cover was shot on a beach of the windward side of the Hawaiian Islands where North Pacific Gyre carries a lot of plastic onto the beach. All of the plastic used was found on the beach within a 90-meter radius, and found within one hour. The plastic found was featured in the "You Can't Control It" music video. Charities such as "5 Gyres," and the "Bahamas Plastic Movement" helped collect plastic from the cover. Johnson stated that when he shot the album cover for the first time he did not see that being the cover for the next album. He originally had planned for it to just be a fun project to promote awareness of plastic pollution.

== Promotion ==
To promote the album, Johnson announced his 2017 Summer & Fall tour. So far the tour consists of a US leg, a South American leg, and an Australian leg. More dates are expected to be added. Artists such as Bahamas, John Craigie, and ALO. Johnson's shows at the Santa Barbara Bowl were plastic free days, in which everyone who attended received a re-usable Jack Johnson metal cup, and this helped promote Brushfire's film Smog of the Sea. Johnson also booked his first show in New Zealand in five years for the tour to promote the album. Johnson's average show gross from the tour was $758,437. Johnson also promoted the album by going on a number of radio shows and doing a podcast with "Outside Online". In addition, he teamed up with Beats 1 and did a live stream the day before the release of the album. Jack has a new Pandora Radio channel that played only songs from this album until September 19, 2017.

On Black Friday 2017 Jack released all of his 2017 Tour merchandise to the public on his website. The products included an exclusive Aloha Kealopiko hand printed surfing shirt. Also, the two Steely's reusable drinkware cups that were available for the album pre-order were released.

== Critical reception ==
Professional ratings
Aggregate scores
Source	Rating
Metacritic	62/100
Review scores
Source	Rating
AllMusic	3.5/5 stars
Drowned in Sound	4/10
Rolling Stone	3/5 stars
The Young Folks	8/10

All the Light Above It Too received mixed reviews from music critics. The album received a score of 62 out of 100 on the review aggregator website Metacritic, based on 5 reviews, indicating "generally favorable reviews". The Cavalier Daily ranked All the Light Above It Too the fourth-most anticipated album coming out this fall. They reviewed the track "My Mind Is for Sale", and "Sunsets for Somebody Else". They explained that Johnson's new album is anticipated to have a mixture between his slower and newer style, plus some of his faster more upbeat older songs. The album was ranked in front of Pink's album Beautiful Trauma and Shania Twain's Now. The Times UK gave the album 2 out of 5 stars, and criticized Johnson for being too political in his songs.

Rolling Stone gave the album a positive review, clearing the album to be a great album to listen to on the beach, or when having friends and enjoying cocktails.

== Track listing ==
Credits adapted from Jack Johnson's official website.

All tracks are written by Jack Johnson, except where noted.

No.	Title	Length
1.	"Subplots"	4:29
2.	"You Can't Control It" (Johnson, Zach Gill)	4:09
3.	"Sunsets for Somebody Else"	3:30
4.	"My Mind Is for Sale"	3:59
5.	"Daybreaks"	3:59
6.	"Big Sur"	2:52
7.	"Love Song #16"	3:01
8.	"Is One Moon Enough?"	4:11
9.	"Gather"	4:15
10.	"Fragments" (from the film Smog of the Sea)	3:41
Total length:		38:06

Japanese edition
No.	Title	Length
11.	"Seasick Dream"	3:21
Total length:		41:27

2018 tour deluxe edition
No.	Title	Length
11.	"Willie Got Me Stoned"	2:23
Total length:		40:29

== Personnel ==
- Jack Johnson – acoustic guitar, electric guitar, drums, piano
- Adam Topol – drums, percussion (tracks 1, 4 and 6)
- Zach Gill – piano, accordion (Tracks 2 and 9)
- Merlo Podlewski – bass (tracks 4 and 6)
- Robbie Lackritz – synths (track 2)

== Chart performance ==
The album debuted at number 5 on the Billboard 200, making it Johnson's seventh top five album and selling 54,000 copies in its first week. The album also debuted at number 1 on the Americana/Folk Albums chart. In its second week, the album dropped to number 24, and also dropped to number 4 on the Americana/Folk Albums. Three weeks after the album's release, it dropped to 106 selling 4,000 copies. The album also debut at number 8 on the Canadian Albums Chart.

== Charts ==
=== Weekly charts ===
Chart (2017)	Peak position
Australian Albums (ARIA)	3
Austrian Albums (Ö3 Austria)	27
Belgian Albums (Ultratop Flanders)	51
Belgian Albums (Ultratop Wallonia)	62
Canadian Albums (Billboard)	8
Dutch Albums (Album Top 100)	29
French Albums (SNEP)	64
German Albums (Offizielle Top 100)	24
New Zealand Albums (RMNZ)	8
Portuguese Albums (AFP)	47
Scottish Albums (Official Charts)	60
Spanish Albums (Promusicae)	41
Swiss Albums (Schweizer Hitparade)	7
UK Albums (Official Charts)	46
US Billboard 200	5
US Top Rock Albums (Billboard)	2

=== Year-end charts ===
Chart (2017)	Peak position
US Americana/Folk Albums (Billboard)	25
US Top Rock Albums (Billboard)	81
US Top Current Album Sales (Billboard)	157

== Release history ==
List of regions, release dates, showing formats, label, editions and references
Region	Date	Format(s)	Label	Ref.
United States	September 8, 2017	CD; digital download; vinyl	Brushfire/Republic	
Various	September 8, 2017	CD; digital download; cassette; vinyl	Island Records	
