= You and Your Heart =

Single by Jack Johnson

from the album To the Sea
- Released: April 6, 2010
- Genre: Soft rock, surf rock
- Length: 3:16 (album version); 3:12 (radio edit)
- Label: Brushfire, Universal Republic
- Songwriter: Jack Johnson

Jack Johnson singles chronology
"Go On" (2008)	"You and Your Heart" (2010)	"At or With Me" (2010)

"You and Your Heart" is a song by Hawaiian singer-songwriter Jack Johnson and is the lead single from his fifth studio album, To the Sea. The song was released to radio in early April 2010, and was released via download on April 6. In Canada, the song premiered on CKOI-FM in Montreal on April 1, 2010.

== Background and song meaning ==
Johnson told MTV News in regards to the inspiration of "You and Your Heart", "[That song] started off with this guitar riff that I had around for a while, actually had it on the last record, and we liked it, but we didn't have any words for it yet, nothing came natural, so I didn't use it. And at some point, some of the books I was reading started leading me in a certain direction, kind of like this broken king character. That area you get in sometimes, where you stop trusting your heart and you start thinking too much about logic and this and that. So it's basically about that separation that can happen between the self and the heart and trying to trust your heart again."

== Reception ==
Sara D. Anderson of AOL called the song "another breezy, rhythm guitar-driven hit" for Johnson, and noted that "the chorus is no different to other Johnson tracks, but the catchy guitar melody—prominent in the track's intro—is slightly more upbeat". In April 2010, the single entered the Billboard Rock Songs chart. A week later, the song debuted at number 20 on the Billboard Hot 100, his highest-peaking single to date. It has since re-entered at #99 and climb to #65, due to digital increase, after the album release. But like with most of his singles, it reached No. 1 on the Triple A chart. It also reached the top 40 of the Canadian Hot 100, and peaked at number 42 in Japan.

The song was used as the theme for the 2010 Little League World Series on ESPN and ABC broadcasts. The music video for the song, available for viewing on YouTube, features Johnson surfing and swimming while singing to the song. This song has been played before takeoff in SunExpress flights in Turkey.

== Charts ==
=== Weekly charts ===
Chart (2010)	Peak position
Australian ARIA Singles Chart	94
Canada Hot 100 (Billboard)	39
Japan Hot 100	42
German Singles Chart	64
Hungary (Rádiós Top 40)	30
US Billboard Hot 100	20
US Adult Pop Airplay (Billboard)	26
US Hot Rock & Alternative Songs (Billboard)	13
US Alternative Airplay (Billboard)	15
US Adult Alternative Airplay (Billboard)	1

=== Year-end charts ===
Chart (2010)	Position
Japanese Adult Contemporary Chart	9
Japanese Digital Track Chart	79

== Certifications ==
Certifications for "You and Your Heart"
Region	Certification	Certified units/sales
Brazil (Pro-Música Brasil)	Gold	30,000^{‡}
Canada (Music Canada)	Gold	40,000^{‡}
^{‡} Sales+streaming figures based on certification alone.
