= Jack Johnson (musician) =

American singer-songwriter (born 1975)

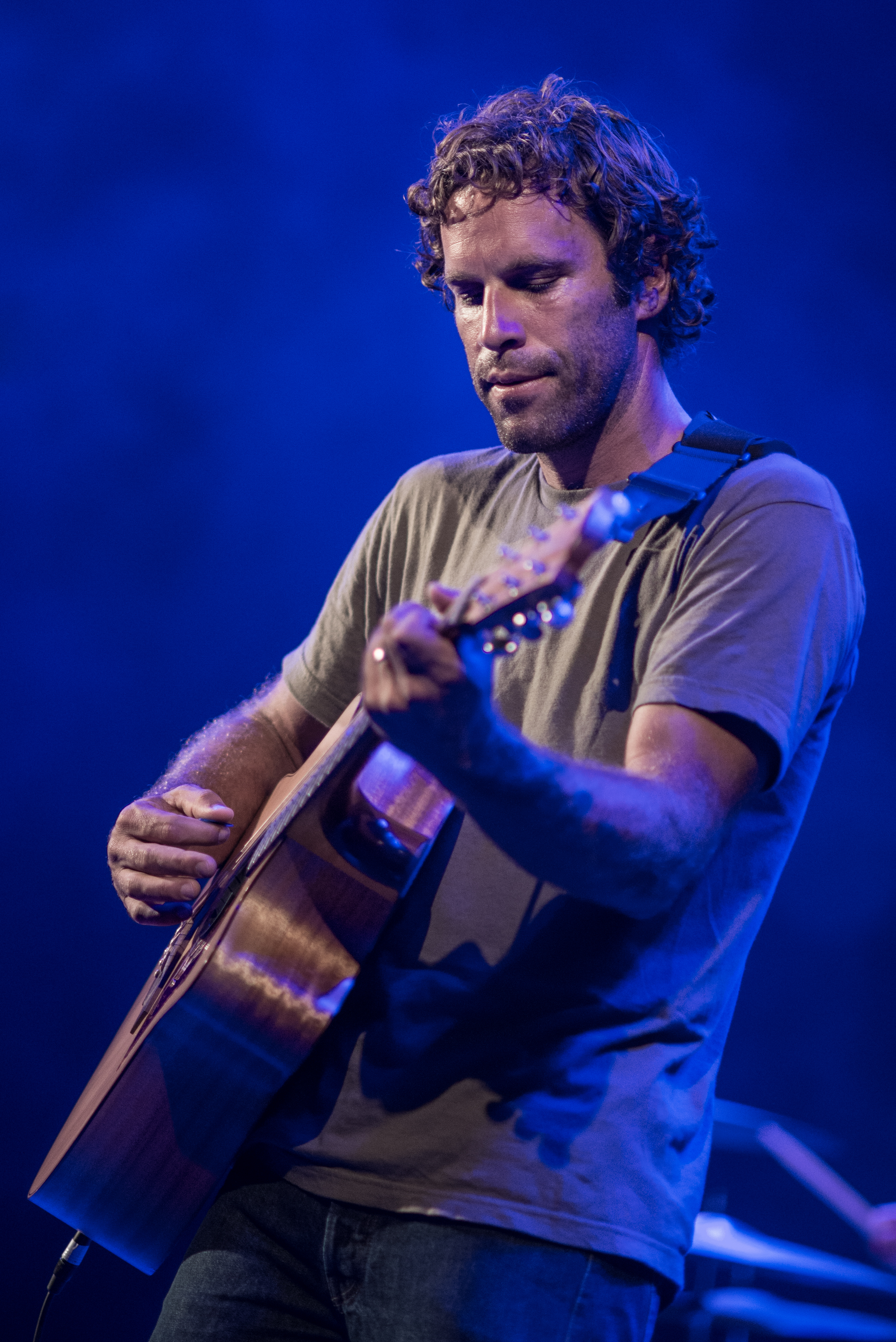
- Johnson performing in 2014

Background information
- Born: Jack Hody Johnson; May 18, 1975 (age 51); North Shore, Oahu, Hawaii, U.S.
- Education: University of California, Santa Barbara (BA)
- Genres: Pop; rock; acoustic; folk; surf rock
- Occupations: Singer-songwriter; multi-instrumentalist; professional surfer; filmmaker
- Instruments: Vocals; guitar; ukulele; keyboards
- Years active: 1992–present
- Spouse: Kim Baker (m. 2000)
- Children: 3
- Website: jackjohnsonmusic.com

Jack Hody Johnson (born May 18, 1975) is an American singer-songwriter. He plays a variety of styles including pop, rock, acoustic, folk, and surf rock.

Johnson's musicianship has earned him multiple spots on the Billboard 200 chart, reaching number one on the chart with his albums Sing-A-Longs and Lullabies for the Film Curious George in 2006, Sleep Through the Static in 2008, To the Sea in 2010 and From Here to Now to You in 2013. His album In Between Dreams peaked at number two on the chart in 2005 and again in 2013. His later studio album All the Light Above It Too released in 2017 debuted at number 5 on the Billboard 200, marking it his seventh top five album.

Born and raised in Hawaii, Johnson is active in environmentalism and sustainability, often with a focus on the world's oceans. Johnson and his wife Kim created the Johnson Ohana Charitable Foundation and the Kōkua Hawaii Foundation. In 2008, Johnson adopted the concept of greening (reduce and reuse), and donated 100% of the proceeds of the Sleep Through the Static tour to the Johnson Ohana Charitable Foundation. Similarly, the proceeds from the 2010 To the Sea album tour went to All at Once, a Johnson-backed collaboration of greening charities promoting fan involvement.

== Early life and education ==
Johnson was born on May 18, 1975, in the North Shore of Oahu, Hawaii. The son of surfer Jeff Johnson, Jack began learning to surf at the age of 5. At 17, he became the youngest invitee to make the finals of the Pipeline Masters, one of surfing's most prestigious events. One week later, however, his stint as a professional surfer ended when he suffered a surfing accident at the Pipeline. He had to have more than 100 stitches in his forehead and a few of his teeth were removed; later the incident became the inspiration for his song "Drink the Water". He appeared as a surfer in The Endless Summer II in 1994.

Johnson graduated from Kahuku High School in 1993. He then attended the University of California, Santa Barbara, graduating in 1997 with a Bachelor of Arts degree in film studies. While Johnson learned the guitar at the age of 8 and started songwriting at the age of 12, his passion for music grew when he played rhythm guitar for the band Soil (not to be confused with a heavy metal band of the same name) in college.

In 1994, Zach Gill's band, Django, released a CD that quickly made Django a favorite band of the Isla Vista, California party scene at UCSB. Django was the rival of Jack Johnson's band Soil, but Gill and Johnson developed a strong friendship, eventually becoming bandmates in later years. While part of Soil at UCSB, Johnson opened for acts such as Sublime and Dave Matthews who were then relatively unknown bands.Johnson credits his songwriting influences as Bob Dylan, Jimi Hendrix, Radiohead, Otis Redding, G. Love and Special Sauce, Ben Harper, Sublime, the Beatles, Bob Marley, Neil Young, and A Tribe Called Quest. Johnson names Jimi Hendrix as his all-time favorite guitarist.

== Career ==
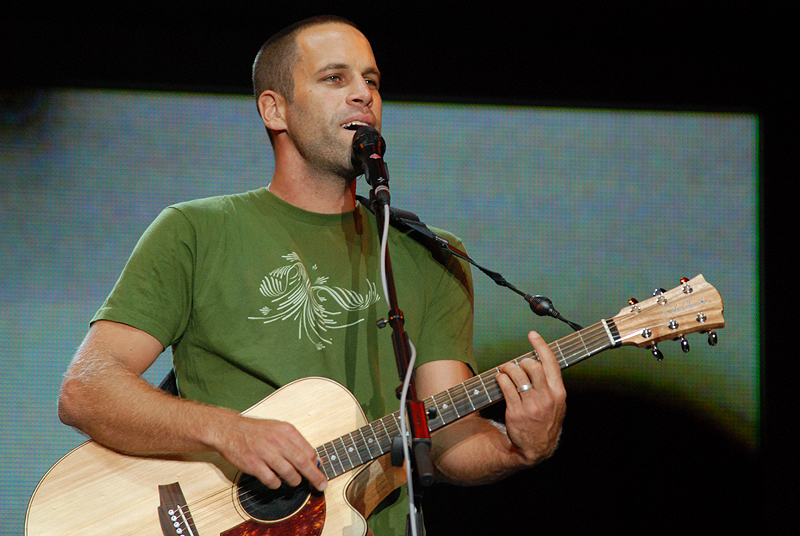
Johnson performing in 2008

=== 2000–2003: Brushfire Fairytales and On and On ===
Jack Johnson's big break was writing and contributing vocals for the song "Rodeo Clowns" which was featured on G. Love's 1999 album Philadelphonic. Johnson was introduced to G. Love by a mutual friend who was shooting surf films with him then. After hearing "Rodeo Clowns", G. Love saw Johnson's potential and effortless style and invited him to record with him. That led to the now-famous "Rodeo Clowns" recording, launching Johnson's career.

In addition to his later success as a musician, Johnson is an accomplished filmmaker. He directed the surf films Thicker Than Water (2000) and The September Sessions (2002), in which he also starred. He recorded both movie soundtracks and starred in the 2004 surf film A Brokedown Melody.

Suela released a four-track demo that caught the attention of Ben Harper's producer, J. P. Plunier, who worked with Johnson to produce his debut album Brushfire Fairytales during December 2000 with Harper and his Weissenborn lap steel guitar making a guest appearance. Brushfire Fairytales was released on February 1, 2001, and led to Johnson becoming the opening act in late February 2001 for the last twenty-three cities of Harper's "Innocent Criminals" tour of the United States.

Johnson as well as Adam Topol (drums, percussion) and Merlo Podlewski (bass), who played on Brushfire Fairytales to record his second full-length album On and On; Mario Caldato Jr. was the producer. It was the first album to be recorded at Johnson's Mango Tree Studio in his hometown of North Shore, Oahu as well as the first to be released through The Moonshine Conspiracy Records. On and On was released on May 6, 2003. The Moonshine Conspiracy Records became Brushfire Records; Johnson turned the offices and studios of his Los Angeles based record company into a model of eco-friendliness, with solar power, recyclable CD packaging, and power-saving air conditioners.

=== 2004–2009: In Between Dreams, Curious George, and Sleep Through the Static ===
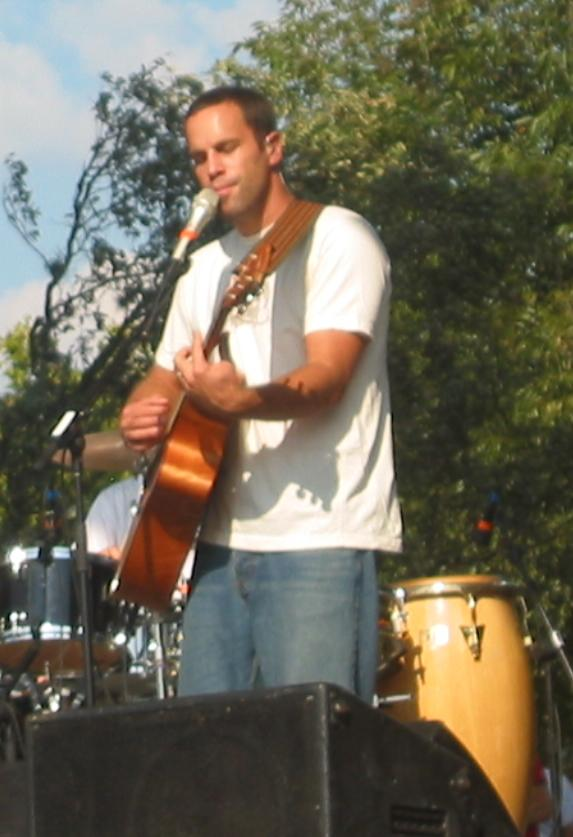
Johnson performing at the Austin City Limits Festival 2004

On April 3, 2004, Johnson and Ben Harper performed with Toots and the Maytals on Saturday Night Live (season 29, episode 16).

In October 2004, Johnson returned to the Mango Tree Studio with Topol and Podlewski along with Zach Gill (of Animal Liberation Orchestra) playing accordion, melodica, and piano recording his follow-up to 2003's On and On. In Between Dreams was released on March 1, 2005. Sing-A-Longs and Lullabies for the Film Curious George is a soundtrack album by Johnson, released on February 7, 2006. The album also features Harper, G. Love, Merlo Podlewski and Zach Gill. It was the first soundtrack to be number 1 on the chart since the Bad Boys II soundtrack in August 2003; it was the first soundtrack for an animated film to top the Billboard 200 since the Pocahontas soundtrack in July 1995. Johnson enlisted J.P. Plunier to produce his fourth full-length studio album, Sleep Through the Static. It was recorded using 100% solar energy at the Solar-Powered Plastic Plant studio in Los Angeles. The album featured Gill (keys), Podlewski (bass), and Topol (drums, percussion). Sleep Through the Static was released on February 1, 2008, followed by a world tour. A live album and DVD of Johnson's 2008 world tour titled En Concert, was released on October 27, 2009. The DVD was directed by Emmett Malloy. Johnson was the headliner for the Friday night of the 2008 Coachella Valley Music and Arts Festival.

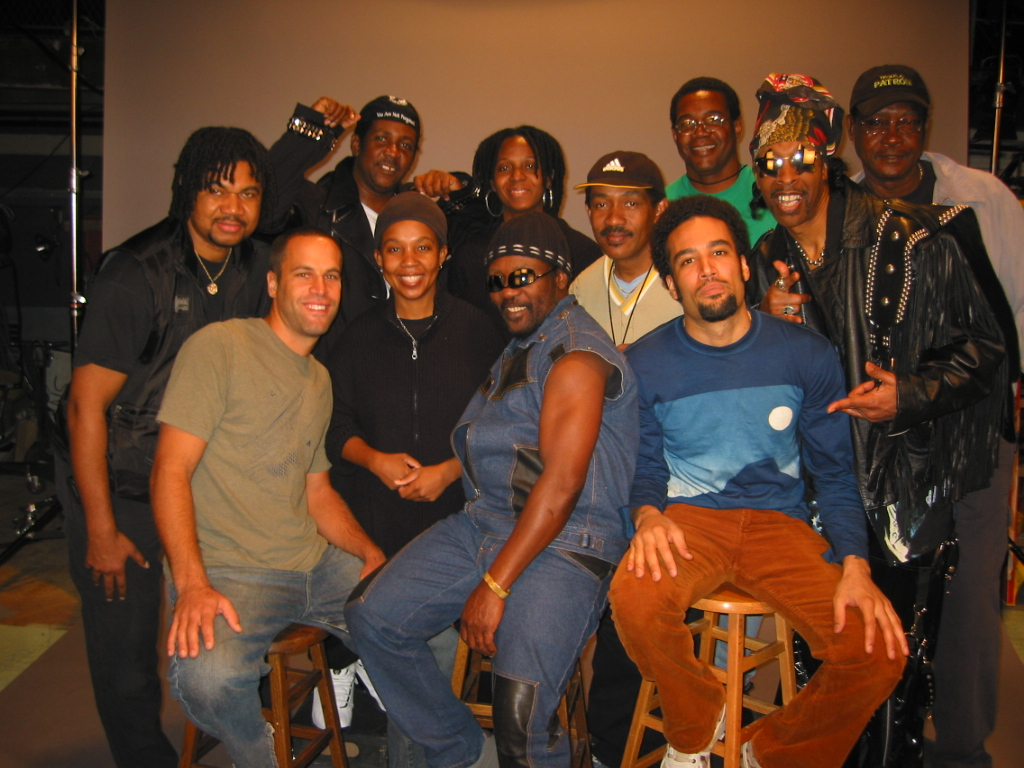
Jack Johnson backstage with Toots and the Maytals and Ben Harper

Johnson spearheaded the Kōkua Festivals (2004–2008 and 2010). Often occurring around Earth Day, the six years of festivals supported the Kōkua Hawai'i Foundation, a charitable organization supporting environmental education in the schools and communities of Hawaii. Kōkua Festival 2004/2005 was a DVD released by Jack Johnson Music showcasing the early Kōkua Festivals. He participated along with Willie Nelson, Jackson Browne, Dave Matthews, Eddie Vedder, and others in the documentary Kōkua 2008: 5 Years of Change (2009). It was produced by Brushfire and Three Foot Giant Productions and shown on Sundance Channel. On April 17, 2012, preceding his 2012 Hawaiian Islands tour, he released the live Kōkua Festival compilation Best of Kōkua Festival. He produced Animal Liberation Orchestra's fifth studio album, Man of the World, which was released on February 9, 2010. The album also features vocals from Johnson.

=== 2010–2011: To the Sea ===
On February 1, 2010, Johnson's official website announced that his fifth studio album, To the Sea, was in the recording process at the Mango Tree Studio, with a planned worldwide release during the first week of June 2010. The website also announced an accompanying European, Australian and New Zealand tour to coincide with the album's release on midnight May 31. The first single from To the Sea was "You and Your Heart", released on April 6, 2010.

While speaking with the New Zealand radio station ZM, Johnson said that he constantly aiming to build relationships with local pro-environment, non-profit groups. "We try to raise money for a lot of these groups who are doing positive things in the community. We try to focus mostly on environmental education, just trying to get kids out into nature, supporting local farms... " He embarked on a world tour in 2010 with Paula Fuga, a Hawaiian vocalist and ukulele player, performing at a range of venues across the world including Europe, Australia, New Zealand, Canada, the U.S., and Japan. On November 1, 2011, Johnson released a stand-alone single called "In The Morning" featuring Paula Fuga and John Cruz.

=== 2012: Hawaiian Islands tour ===
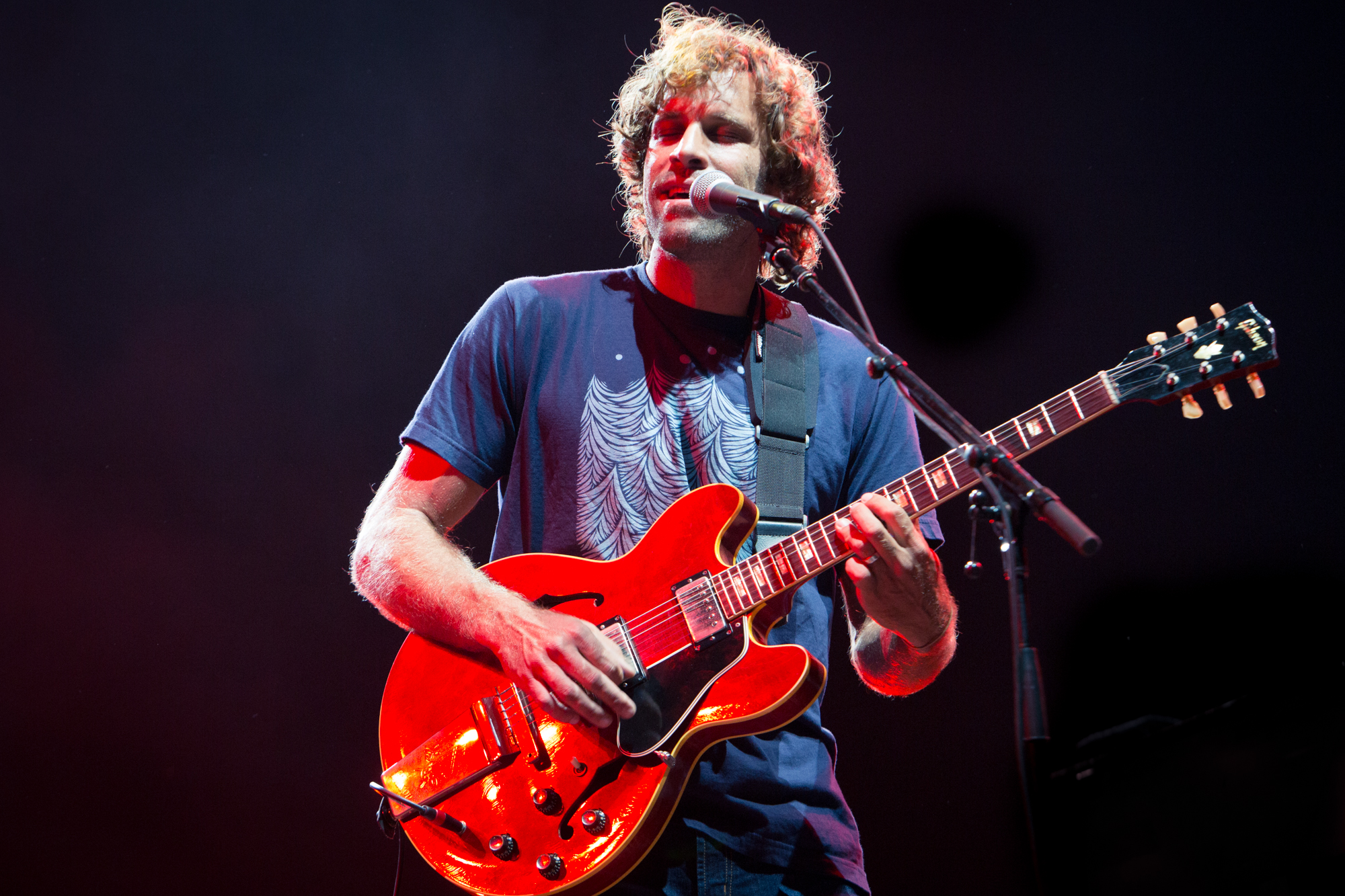
Johnson performing as a headliner at Bonnaroo on June 15, 2013

On February 22, 2012, Johnson with John Cruz and Paula Fuga announced a 7-show acoustic tour of the Hawaiian islands during April. At the Stan Sheriff Center on April 14, 2012, during the Pillars of Peace Hawai'i: Building Peace on a Foundation of Aloha, he performed introductory music before Nobel Peace Laureate Tenzin Gyatso, the 14th Dalai Lama of Tibet, gave the speech "Educating the Heart". Better Together was one of several songs Johnson performed.

=== 2013–2018: Bonnaroo, From Here to Now to You, and All the Light Above It Too ===
Johnson released From Here to Now to You with his band on September 17, 2013. On June 15, 2013, they performed as headliners at the 2013 Bonnaroo in Tennessee, stepping in last-minute after a medical emergency caused Mumford & Sons to pull out. He played two acoustic concerts, one at London's Tabernacle in Notting Hill and the other at New York City's Allen Room at Lincoln Center overlooking Central Park, featuring songs from his upcoming album. The From Here to Now to You Tour ran from March through September 2014.

In February 2017, Johnson announced a U.S. tour beginning in Chicago at the Huntington Bank Pavilion on Northerly Island on June 1 and ending with two Kōkua Hawai'i Foundation benefit concerts at the Waikiki Shell on August 4 & 5. He revealed plans to release an album in the summer of 2017. Later, he added a September 10 concert for the 2017 Ohana Fest at Doheny State Beach in Dana Point, California. On September 8, 2017, he released his seventh studio album All the Light Above It Too, which peaked at number 13 on the Billboard chart's "Artist 100." In July 2018, Johnson released his greatest hits album "Jack Johnson: The Essentials" only in Japan.

=== 2019–present: This Warm December, Meet the Moonlight and Surfilmusic ===
In late 2019, Johnson released a single "New Axe", featured on the This Warm December Vol. 3 album. He did a "Together at Home" Instagram Live stream concert on March 28, 2020. His concert was the third most watched on the Global Citizen YouTube. He also performed on the One World: Together at Home special; a live version of "Better Together" was featured on the One World: Together at Home album. On May 1, 2020, he was featured on Milky Chance's new single "Don't Let Me Down". On September 26, 2020, Johnson performed the opening set at Farm Aid: On the Road.

On December 4, 2020, Johnson released a new single titled "The Captain Is Drunk". On April 16, 2021, he released a song titled "If Ever" with Paula Fuga and Ben Harper. The song appeared on Fuga's new album Rain on Sunday, which is featured on Johnson's record label. On June 24, 2022, Johnson released his eighth studio album, Meet the Moonlight, his first full-length record in five years. It was produced by Blake Mills, engineered by Joseph Lorge, and recorded both in Los Angeles (at Sound City Studios and EastWest Studios) and at The Mango Tree (Johnson's home studio) in Hawaii. The album's lead single is titled "One Step Ahead".

Coinciding with his new album release, Johnson embarked on the Meet the Moonlight Tour with 35 stops at major venues across the United States (including Hawaii) and Canada. He was accompanied by various artists including Grammy Award winner (and personal friend) Ziggy Marley. In November 2021, Johnson toured Australia and New Zealand, his first overseas concerts since 2019.

On November 21, 2025, Johnson's Instagram announced a documentary film called Surfilmusic about his life from when he started surfing to becoming a musician. It was released on March 13, 2026, in Austin, Texas. Johnson will be touring for the film from June to October 2026.

== Personal life ==
Johnson married his college girlfriend, Kim Baker, on July 22, 2000; they have two sons and a daughter. The couple lives on the North Shore of the island of Oahu in Hawaii. In an interview with Johnson, Ann Donahue from Billboard described his family life by saying, "There is often trouble in balancing the life of an artist, environmentalist, and family man, but Johnson seems to have the niche for such a challenge. This time around, he's found a pace that agrees with him... bringing his family along so he can spend mornings with them sightseeing." Johnson and his wife have declined to talk about or release information about their children.

=== Charity ===
In 2008, Johnson and his wife created the Johnson Ohana Charitable Foundation, a non-profit public charity supporting environmental, art, and music education worldwide. The couple also founded the Kokua Hawaii Foundation in 2003. Family members work hard every year at festivals and concerts to raise money for causes they feel are important.

Jack Johnson recorded a cover of John Lennon's "Imagine" for the 2007 benefit album Instant Karma: The Amnesty International Campaign to Save Darfur, which was also included on the 2009 benefit album Rhythms del Mundo Classics. Rolling Stone wrote: "It is a typically generous move from Johnson, who has used his multi-platinum success to support causes he cares about." Although the Johnson Ohana Charitable Foundation is a non-profit that "focuses on environmental, arts and music education", it has raised more than $750,000 from 2009 to 2010 to give away. Johnson was in Osaka, Japan, on his To the Sea 2010 World Tour at the time of the 2011 Tōhoku earthquake and tsunami in northern Japan. He was in a hotel with his family when it struck. After postponing the rest of his tour, he donated $50,000 to GlobalGiving's Japan Earthquake and Tsunami Relief Fund.

Johnson's Ohana Charitable Foundation has supported Little Kids Rock, a national nonprofit that works to restore and revitalize music education in disadvantaged U.S. public schools. Johnson decorated a guitar for Little Kids Rock to auction, raising funds for its program. On September 22, 2012, he donated his time to play a few songs at Farm Aid 2012 in Hershey, Pennsylvania. Later in 2012, Johnson donated $50,000 for Hurricane Sandy relief and added links on his website for others to donate:

After years of touring and surfing along the East Coast, I have made so many great friends. It is heartbreaking to see the images and hear their stories. I just made donations to help recover and relief efforts for Hurricane Sandy. Below is a list of groups you can support. If you can't donate money, you can donate food, supplies or your time. Our East Coast family, friends and neighbors need our help. Aloha – Jack

In 2018, Johnson became an international ambassador for Plastic Free July, an annual global movement focused on reducing single-use plastic consumption. In 2019, Johnson partnered as an artist ambassador with Green Music Australia and the Sustainable Concerts Working Group to launch the international #BYOBottle campaign.

== Discography ==
- Brushfire Fairytales (2001)
- On and On (2003)
- In Between Dreams (2005)
- Sing-A-Longs and Lullabies for the Film Curious George (2006)
- Sleep Through the Static (2008)
- To the Sea (2010)
- From Here to Now to You (2013)
- All the Light Above It Too (2017)
- Meet the Moonlight (2022)

== Filmography ==
Film
Year	Title	Role	Notes
1999	Nice Guys Sleep Alone	Woody	Actor
2000	Thicker than Water	Himself	Documentary; also director
2001	Out Cold	Jack Johnson and Band	Actor; cameo
2002	The September Sessions	Himself	Documentary; also director
2002	Getting Out		Short film; composer
2003	12		Composer
2004	A Brokedown Melody	Himself	Documentary; also director
2017	The Smog of the Sea	Himself	Documentary; composer
2026	Surfilmusic	Himself	Documentary; actor

== List of awards and nominations received ==
Award	Year	Nominee(s)	Category	Result	Ref.
Billboard Music Awards	2006	Himself	Top Digital Album Artist	Nominated	
Billboard Music Awards	2006	Curious George	Top Digital Album	Nominated	
Billboard Music Awards	2006	Curious George	Top Soundtrack	Nominated	
Billboard Music Awards	2011	To the Sea	Top Alternative Album	Nominated	
Billboard Music Awards	2011	To the Sea	Top Rock Album	Nominated	
Billboard Year-End	2008	Himself	Top Digital Album Artist	Nominated	
Billboard Year-End	2008	Himself	Top Alternative Album Artist	Nominated	
Billboard Year-End	2008	Himself	Top Rock Album Artist	Nominated	
Billboard Year-End	2008	Sleep Through the Static	Top Digital Album	Nominated	
Billboard Year-End	2008	Sleep Through the Static	Top Alternative Album	Nominated	
Billboard Year-End	2008	Sleep Through the Static	Top Rock Album	Nominated	
Echo Music Prize	2006	Himself	Best International Male	Nominated	
Echo Music Prize	2007	Himself	Best International Male	Nominated	
Echo Music Prize	2009	Himself	Best International Male	Nominated	
mtvU Woodie Awards	2004	Himself	The Best Showing Woody	Nominated	
mtvU Woodie Awards	2005	"Sitting, Waiting, Wishing"	Best Video Woodie	Nominated	
RTHK International Pop Poll Awards	2006	Himself	Top Male Artist	Nominated	
RTHK International Pop Poll Awards	2006	"Good People"	Top Ten International Gold Songs	Nominated	
RTHK International Pop Poll Awards	2007	"Upside Down"	Top Ten International Gold Songs	Nominated	
RTHK International Pop Poll Awards	2007	Himself	Top Male Artist	Nominated	
RTHK International Pop Poll Awards	2008	Himself	Top Male Artist	Bronze	
RTHK International Pop Poll Awards	2008	"If I Had Eyes"	Top Ten International Gold Songs	Nominated	
RTHK International Pop Poll Awards	2022	"One Step Ahead"	Top Ten International Gold Songs	Nominated	
RTHK International Pop Poll Awards	2022	Himself	Top Male Artist	Nominated	
Teen Choice Awards	2005	Himself	Choice Music: Male Artist	Nominated	
Teen Choice Awards	2006	Himself	Choice Music: Male Artist	Nominated	
Teen Choice Awards	2010	"You and Your Heart"	Choice Music: Rock Track	Nominated	
Teen Choice Awards	2010	To the Sea	Choice Music: Rock Album	Nominated	
Tokio Hot 100 Awards	2008	Himself	Best Male Artist	Nominated	

Award	Year	Category	Result
ESPN Film Festival	2000	Adobe Highlight Award	Won
Surfer Magazine	2000	2000 Video of the Year Award	Won
ESPN Action, Sports & Music Awards	2001	Surfing's Music Artist of the Year	Won
ESPN Action, Sports & Music Awards	2002	Surfing's Music Artist of the Year	Won
ASCAP Pop Music Awards	2003	ASCAP College Vanguard Award	Won
ESPN Action, Sports & Music Awards	2005	Best Video Woodie – Live Action (Best Live Action Video)	Nominated
ESPN Action, Sports & Music Awards	2005	Road Woodie (Best Tour)	Nominated
Satellite Awards	2006	Best Original Song (from movie "Curious George")	Nominated
MTV Video Music Awards Japan	2006	Best Male Video	Nominated
Meteor Ireland Music Awards	2006	Best International Male	Nominated
Grammy Awards	2006	Best Male Pop Vocal Performance	Nominated
Grammy Awards	2006	Best Pop Collaboration with Vocals	Nominated
Brit Awards	2006	Best International Male Solo Artist	Nominated
Brit Awards	2006	International Breakthrough Artist	Won
Brit Awards	2007	Best International Male Solo Artist	Nominated
Billboard Touring Awards	2010	Humanitarian Award	Won
National Wildlife Foundation (NWF)	2012	National Conservation Achievement Award in Communications	Won

== See also ==
- List of singer-songwriters
