= Yeah, It's That Easy =

Studio album by G. Love & Special Sauce
- Released: October 28, 1997
- Genres: Alternative hip hop, funk rock
- Length: 59:35
- Label: Okeh/Epic
- Producers: G. Love, Stiff Johnson, All Fellas Band, Johnny Jams

G. Love & Special Sauce chronology
Coast to Coast Motel (1995)	Yeah, It's That Easy (1997)	Philadelphonic (1999)

Singles from Yeah, It's That Easy
- 1. "Stepping Stones" Released: 1997; 2. "I-76" Released: 1997

Professional ratings
Review scores
Source	Rating
AllMusic	3/5 stars
Entertainment Weekly	C
Pitchfork	3.0/10

Yeah, It's That Easy is the third album by G. Love & Special Sauce, released in 1997. Dr. John contributed to the album. "Stepping Stones" was a minor modern rock radio hit.

== Critical reception ==
Entertainment Weekly thought that "songs like 'I-76', a goofball paean to his native Philadelphia, sound less like Ray Charles and more like Ray Stevens." Trouser Press wrote that "the potentially worthy grooves found in the rim-shot soul of 'Lay Down the Law' and the jazzy hip-hop of the title track stretch into monotonous jamband crap that would make Dave Matthews apologize for his thoughtlessness."

The Washington Post determined that "Love is at his best when he allows pop pleasures to shine through the montage of archival roots and hip-hop experiments."

== Track listing ==
All tracks written by G. Love except as noted.

1. "Stepping Stones" – 4:24
2. "I-76" (All Fellas Band) – 3:46
3. "Lay Down the Law" (All Fellas Band) – 5:37
  - Dedicated to Greg Burgess
4. "Slipped Away (The Ballad of Lauretha Vaird)" (G. Love, C. Treece) – 4:47
  - In memory of Lauretha Vaird, an officer slain in the line of duty
5. "You Shall See" – 4:15
6. "Take You There" – 3:11
7. "Willow Tree" – 3:27
8. "Yeah, It's That Easy" (G. Love, J. Clemens, Fela Kuti no agreement(part2) ) – 5:37
9. "Recipe" – 3:36
10. "200 Years" (All Fellas Band) – 2:33
11. "Making Amends" (G. Love, J. Clemens) – 4:17
12. "Pull the Wool" – 9:23
13. "When We Meet Again" – 4:49

== Personnel ==
- G. Love – Guitar, Harmonica, Vocals
- Jeff "The Houseman" Clemens – Drums, vocals
- Jimmy "Jazz" Prescott – acoustic Bass
- Dr. John - Hammond organ, piano
- King Kane - Bass, backing vocals
- Katman - bass, lead vocals
- Jony V - drums
- Chuck Treece - drums
- Smiles - vocals
- BroDeeva - backing vocals
- Mary Harris - backing vocals
- All Fellas Band - backing vocals, percussion
- Mike Tyler - backing vocals
- Jay Davidson - Piano
