= The Hustle (album) =

Studio album by G. Love
- Released: August 24, 2004
- Studio: Philadelphonic Studios (Philadelphia, PA)
- Length: 45:33
- Label: Brushfire
- Producer: Chris DiBeneditto; G. Love & Special Sauce; Ian Cross; Jack Johnson; Mario C.

G. Love chronology
Electric Mile (2001)	The Hustle (2004)	Lemonade (2006)

Singles from The Hustle
- 1. "Astronaut" Released: June 15, 2004; 2. "Booty Call" Released: May 16, 2005

Professional ratings
Review scores
Source	Rating
AllMusic	3.5/5 stars

The Hustle is the first solo studio album by American musician G. Love. It was released on August 24, 2004, via Brushfire Records. Recording sessions took place at Philadelphonic Studios in Philadelphia. Production was handled by Mario C., G. Love & Special Sauce, Jack Johnson, Ian Cross and Chris DiBeneditto. It features contributions from Jack Johnson, Chuck Treece, Money Mark, Jason Yates, Danny Frankel, Koool G Murder and Pete Kuzma. The album peaked at number 100 on the Billboard 200 albums chart in the United States. The album's single "Astronaut" made it to number 37 on the US Alternative Airplay chart.

== Track listing ==
No.	Title	Writer(s)	Producer(s)	Length
1.	"Astronaut"	Garrett Dutton; James Prescott; Jason Corgan Brown	Mario C.	3:23
2.	"Don't Drop It!"	Dutton	Mario C.	2:45
3.	"Love"	Dutton	Mario C.	3:39
4.	"Booty Call"	Dutton	Mario C.	3:25
5.	"Give It to You" (featuring Jack Johnson)	Dutton; Jack Johnson; Prescott	Mario C.; G. Love; Jack Johnson	3:24
6.	"The Hustle"	Dutton; Prescott	Mario C.	3:21
7.	"Front Porch Lounger"	Dutton	Mario C.	3:59
8.	"Loving Me"	Dutton	Mario C.	3:21
9.	"Waiting"	Dutton	Chris DiBeneditto	3:19
10.	"Fishing Song"	Dutton	G. Love & Special Sauce; Ian Cross	2:46
11.	"Back of the Bus"	Dutton	G. Love & Special Sauce; Ian Cross	3:32
12.	"Two Birds"	Dutton	Mario C.; G. Love; Jack Johnson	2:08
13.	"Stone Me"	Dutton	Mario C.; G. Love; Jack Johnson	4:24
14.	"Sunshine"	Dutton	Mario C.; G. Love; Jack Johnson	2:07
Total length:				45:33

Bonus tracks
No.	Title	Writer(s)	Producer(s)	Length
15.	"Kickin' Back"	Dutton	Pete Donnelly; G. Love	4:22
16.	"Amy"	Dutton; Prescott; Chuck Treece	Chris DiBeneditto	2:15
17.	"Ain't That Right"	Dutton	Chris DiBeneditto	4:16
18.	"Windshield Wiper, No. 1"	Dutton; Prescott; Treece	Chris DiBeneditto	3:59

== Personnel ==
- Garrett "G. Love" Dutton — vocals, guitar, harp, producer (tracks: 5, 10–14)
- Jeffrey "Houseman" Clemens — vocals, drums, producer (tracks: 10, 11)
- James "Jimi Jazz" Prescott — upright bass, producer (tracks: 10, 11)
- Mario Caldato Jr. — producer & engineering (tracks: 1–8, 12–14), mixing
- Jack Johnson — producer (tracks: 5, 12–14)
- Chris DiBeneditto — producer & engineering (track 9)
- Ian Cross — producer (tracks: 10, 11)
- Walt Bass — engineering (tracks: 10, 11)
- Bernie Grundman — mastering
- Dave Lively — design
- Scott Soens — photography

== Charts ==
Chart (2004–05)	Peak position
Australian Albums (ARIA Charts)	93
US Billboard 200	100
