= Set Sail (The Movement album) =

Studio album by The Movement
- Released: October 25, 2008
- Studios: Philadelphonic, Philadelphia, Pennsylvania
- Genres: Rock; reggae; hip hop; acoustic
- Label: Onebaldegg Productions
- Producer: Chris DiBeneditto

The Movement chronology
Alive at Home (2006)	Set Sail (2008)

Professional ratings
Review scores
Source	Rating
The Pier	

Set Sail is The Movement's second studio album, produced by Chris DiBeneditto at Philadelphonic Studios in Philadelphia, Pennsylvania and released on October 25, 2008. This album features artists such as Garrett "G. Love" Dutton and Mark Boyce of G. Love & Special Sauce, Chuck Treece, and Oguer Ocon of Slightly Stoopid.

== Track listing ==
All tracks by Jordan Miller and Josh Swain except where noted.

1. "Say Hello" – 3:13
2. "Mexico" – 4:12
3. "Set Sail" – 3:36
4. "Impressions" – 3:56
5. "Green Girl" – 3:45
6. "Habit" – 4:11
7. "Cool-Aid" – 4:21
8. "Ocho Rios" – 3:25
9. "Alright" – 3:04
10. "Sweet Summertime" – 3:37
11. "Throwdown" – 3:39
12. "Another Man's Shoes" (feat. G. Love) (Garrett Dutton, Miller, Swain) – 3:34
13. "Scream" – 3:57
14. "Kind" – 3:34 (hidden track "Breathe" – 4:56)

== Personnel ==
- Mark Boyce – keyboards
- Chris DiBeneditto – producer, engineer, mixing, tracking
- Garrett "G. Love" Dutton – vocals, harmonica
- Jordan Miller – guitar, vocals
- Oguer Ocon – percussion
- Jon Ruff – turntables
- Josh Swain – bass guitar, guitar, vocals
- Chuck Treece – drums
