= G. Love =

American musician

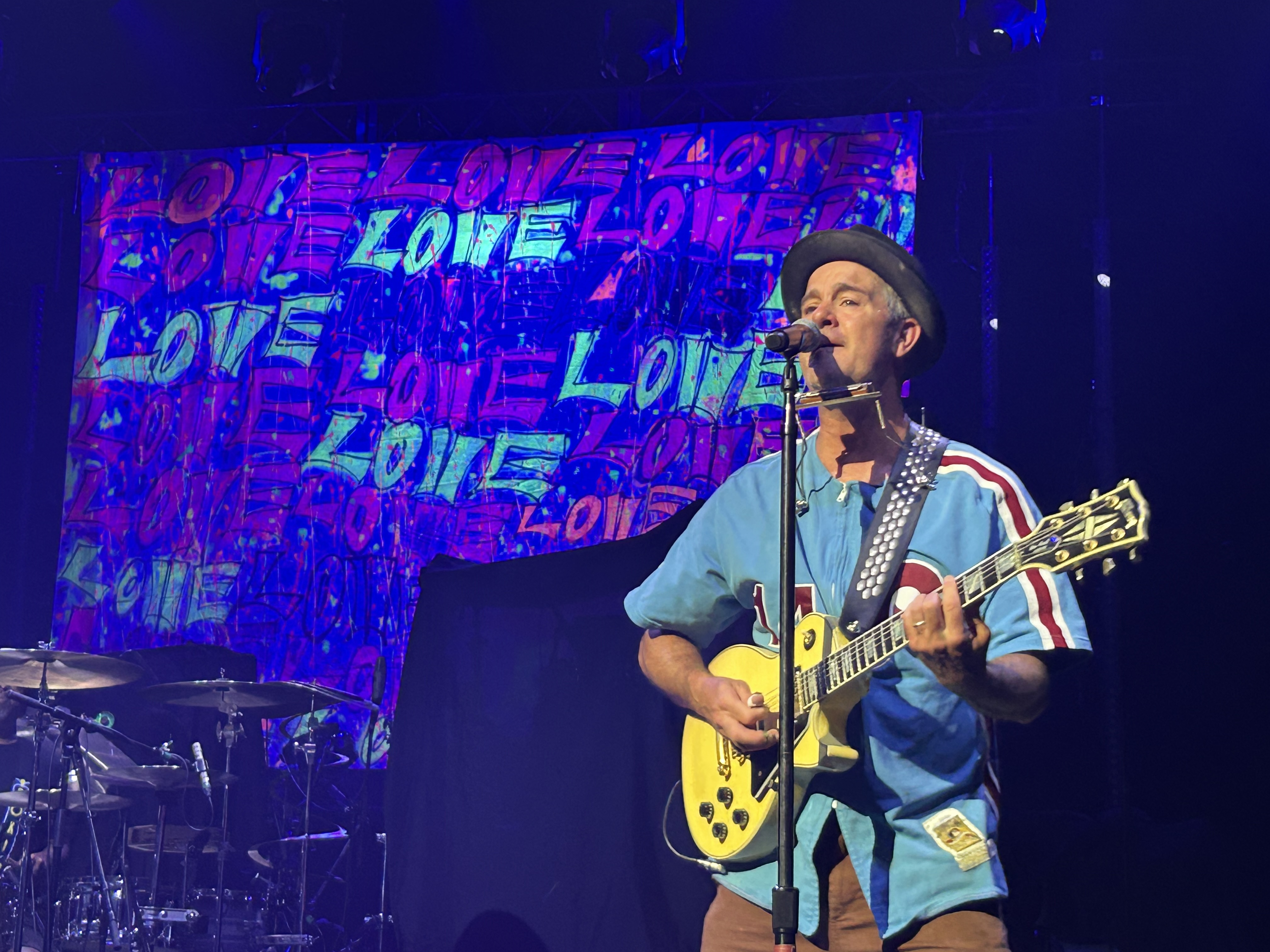

Background information
- Born: Garrett Dutton; October 3, 1972 (age 53); Philadelphia, Pennsylvania, U.S.
- Instruments: Guitar, harmonica, vocals
- Labels: Brushfire, Republic, Thirty Tigers
- Website: philadelphonic.com

Garrett Dutton (born October 3, 1972), better known as G. Love, is an American singer, rapper and musician best known as the frontman for the band G. Love & Special Sauce.

== Early life, family and education ==
Dutton was born in the Society Hill neighborhood of Philadelphia. He is the son of a banking lawyer. He began playing guitar at age eight. He wrote his first song by the time he was in the ninth grade and began playing harmonica in a wire rack. Dutton credits Bob Dylan and John Hammond Jr., as well as the then-contemporary "old school" hip-hop sounds of Run-DMC, the Beastie Boys, and Philadelphia's own Schoolly D, as influences.

Dutton attended high school at the private Germantown Friends School. He began playing solo on the streets of Philadelphia. After one year at Skidmore College, Dutton dropped out and relocated to Boston.

== Career ==
In Boston, Dutton worked as a fundraiser for Peace Action and playing wherever and whenever he could. Shortly after he moved to Boston, Dutton met Tom DeMille, a local producer Dutton later nicknamed T-Time, a reference to DeMille’s appreciation for both music and golf). DeMille had hung a flyer at local music store 'Daddy's Junky Music,’ describing his desire to combine blues influences (like Muddy Waters, Howling Wolf, Little Walter, etc.) with modern music to create a new sound. This appealed to Dutton, whose approach to music was similar to what DeMille described. Initially, Dutton had focused on recording songs including “Yeah, It's That Easy” and “This Ain't Living,” that combined street influences with classic blues instrumentation. Early renditions were typically Dobro guitar over an early-1990s hip-hop beat, backed by synth bass and keys played by T-Time. In 1992, Dutton and DeMille realized that neither of them was particularly good at programming drum tracks, and Dutton began looking for help in that area.

One of his few indoor gigs at this time was a Boston bar called The Tam O'Shanter (a Boston institution which was in business until 2018), where he met drummer Jeffrey "The Houseman" Clemens in January 1993. Dutton and Clemens began working as a duo, and were joined a few months later by bassist Jim "Jimi Jazz" Prescott. This trio became the house band on Mondays at The Plough and Stars in Cambridge, Massachusetts.

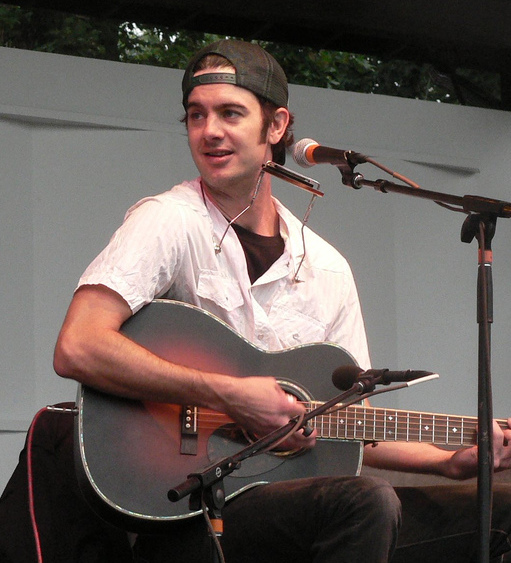
G. Love

In 1993, DeMille flew to New York to meet with a Los Angeles–based producer who had connections to Michael Jackson (arranged through a family friend). DeMille shared some studio and live recordings of Dutton, who had just started going by the moniker G. Love. Later in 1993, G. Love and Special Sauce (as the trio was now called) signed a record deal and released their self-titled debut album in 1994. The band have released a further ten albums since.

G. Love and Special Sauce featured Jack Johnson on their 1999 album Philadelphonic playing an early version of Jack Johnson's "Rodeo Clowns" when Johnson was an unknown artist. Johnson later featured the song on his 2003 album On and On. G. Love met Johnson through a mutual surf buddy who said, "Hey man, there's this kid you got to meet. He's a big fan and he's got this song called 'rodeo clowns' and I think it's really great and I really think you should hear it." After that, G. Love saw Johnson's effortless style and potential and invited him into the studio to record the now-famous "Rodeo Clowns".

He wrote the song "Beautiful" with Tristan Prettyman (whom he was dating). Known for his live shows, he is often seen touring with Jack Johnson and Citizen Cope. As a producer, Johnson signed G. Love to his record label Brushfire Records. He has made appearances on the records of artists such as Slightly Stoopid and Donavon Frankenreiter, and has toured with Dave Matthews.

In 2009, he collaborated with Zap Mama on their album ReCreation, singing on the single "Drifting". In 2010, G. Love joined forces with The Avett Brothers, who produced and are featured on his album Fixin' to Die. The album was released under the Brushfire label on February 22, 2011. In 2011, he narrated the documentary Almost Answered which highlights his hometown professional basketball team the Philadelphia 76ers' 2001 season. His track "Shooting Hoops" is featured in the soundtrack for the videogame NBA 2K8.

== Discography ==
=== Studio albums – solo ===
- Lemonade (Brushfire Records – 2006)
- Fixin' To Die (Brushfire Records – 2011)

=== Studio albums – with Special Sauce ===
- G. Love and Special Sauce (Epic – 1994)
- Coast to Coast Motel (Epic – 1995)
- Yeah, It's That Easy (Epic – 1997)
- Philadelphonic (550 Music – 1999)
- Electric Mile (550 Music – 2001)
- The Hustle (Brushfire Records – 2004)
- Superhero Brother (Brushfire Records – 2008)
- Sugar (Brushfire Records – April 22, 2014)
- Love Saves The Day (Brushfire Records – October 30, 2015)
- The Juice (2020)
- Philadelphia Mississippi (Philadelphonic Records - June 26, 2022)
- Fishing For Christmas (2024)
- Ode To R.L. (2025)

=== Bootlegs, demos or outtake albums ===
- Back in the Day (1993) [with Special Sauce]
- G. Love In the King's Court (Fishtown Records – 1998; available online or at live shows, also Chicken Platters Records -1996 CP002) [as King's Court]
- Oh Yeah (Philadelphonic Records – 1998) [Solo]
- Has Gone Country (1998) [Solo] (Later Released as a studio album)
- Rappin' Blues EP (1999) [with Special Sauce]
- Front Porch Loungin' (2000) [with Special Sauce]
- Long Way Down (Philadelphonic Records – 2009 Australia- & New Zealand–only release) [with Special Sauce]

=== Compilation albums ===
- Best Of (Sony – 2002) [with Special Sauce]
- Playlist: The Very Best of G. Love & Special Sauce (The Okeh Years) (Epic/Legacy – 2013) [with Special Sauce]
