= I Gotta Habit =

Studio album by Cool C
- Released: August 8, 1989
- Genre: Hip hop
- Label: Atlantic
- Producers: Lawrence Goodman; Warren McGlone

Cool C chronology
I Gotta Habit (1989)	Life In The Ghetto (1990)

Professional ratings
Review scores
Source	Rating
AllMusic	3/5 stars

I Gotta Habit is the debut album by Philadelphia-based, old school rapper Cool C, released in 1989. The album reached No. 51 on the Billboard R&B Albums chart in 1989, and the single, "Glamorous Life", peaked at No. 11 on the Hot Rap Singles chart that same year.

The music video for "Glamorous Life" was rumored to have an early appearance from a then-unknown Jill Scott. However, music video director Lionel C. Martin disputed the rumor, saying "People always ask if the young girl in the video is Jill Scott, but I'm 99 percent sure that it isn't. She never mentioned when we worked together". DJ Tat Money, former DJ for fellow Philadelphia rapper Steady B, also disputed the rumor on Twitter in 2014, saying: "Short answer? Nope not her. This girl was from Jersey. Some random model chick".

== Track listing ==
1. "Enemy Territory" (Cool C, Warren McGlone, Lawrence Goodman) – 3:55
2. "Takin' No Shorts (The Gambler)" (Cool C, McGlone, Goodman) – 4:25
3. "Get Loose On" (Cool C, McGlone, Goodman) – 4:11
4. "Mary Go Round" (Cool C, McGlone, Goodman) – 4:29
5. "C Is Cool" (Cool C, McGlone, Goodman) – 3:27
6. "I'm Not Impressed" (Cool C, McGlone, Goodman) – 4:33
7. "I Gotta Habit" (Cool C, McGlone, Goodman) – 3:55
8. "Glamorous Life" (Cool C, McGlone, Goodman) – 3:58
9. "Juice Crew Dis" (Cool C, McGlone, Goodman) – 4:06
10. "All Hell Freeze" (Cool C, McGlone, Goodman) – 4:06
11. "Down To The Grissle" (Cool C, McGlone, Goodman) – 3:14
12. "Hilltop Scope" (Cool C, McGlone, Goodman) – 3:15

== Charts ==
Chart (1989)	Peak position
US Top R&B Albums (Billboard)	51

Singles

Year	Single	Chart	Peak position
1989	"Glamorous Life"	Hot Rap Singles	11
1990	"I Got A Habit"	Hot Rap Singles	17
