= Fixin' to Die =

Studio album by G. Love
- Released: February 22, 2011
- Recorded: Echo Mountain Recording, Asheville, NC
- Length: 47:51
- Label: Brushfire
- Producers: Scott Avett, Seth Avett

G. Love chronology
Superhero Brother (2008)	Fixin' to Die (2011)

Fixin' to Die is the third solo studio album (and ninth overall studio album, including all G. Love and Special Sauce material) by G. Love, released on February 22, 2011 on Brushfire Records. The album was produced by Scott and Seth Avett, of the Avett Brothers. The two were also the backing band for the album. Though the album is a solo venture rather than a G. Love and Special Sauce album, Jeffery Clemens, the drummer of Special Sauce, performs on five tracks.

== Track listing ==
1. "Fixin' to Die" – 3:28 (Bukka White)
2. "The Road" – 2:45 (Dutton)
3. "Katie Miss" - 2:22 (Scott Avett, Dutton)
4. "Milk and Sugar" - 3:18 (Dutton)
5. "50 Ways to Leave Your Lover" - 4:22 (Paul Simon)
6. "You've Got to Die" - 3:38 (Blind Willie McTell)
7. "Walk On" - 3:43 (Dutton)
8. "Just Fine" - 4:33 (Cisco Adler, Dutton)
9. "Ma mère" - 3:54 (Dutton)
10. "Get Goin'" - 3:10 (Dutton)
11. "Heaven" - 2:58 (Dutton)
12. "Home" - 3:40 (Dutton)
13. "Pale Blue Eyes" - 6:07 (Lou Reed)

iTunes Version includes bonus track:

14. "500 Mile Girl" - 4:38
