= Long Way Down (disambiguation) =

Long Way Down was a 2007 motorcycle journey undertaken by Ewan McGregor and Charley Boorman, and the title of the accompanying television series, book and DVD.

Long Way Down may also refer to:

- "Long Way Down" (Goo Goo Dolls song), 1995
- "Long Way Down" (Keyshia Cole song), 2010
- "Long Way Down" (Kiss song), 2012
- "Long Way Down" (Robert DeLong song), 2014
- Long Way Down (Tom Odell album), 2013
- Long Way Down (G. Love & Special Sauce album), 2009
- "Long Way Down (Look What the Cat Drug In)", a Michael Penn song from the 1992 album Free-for-All
- "Long Way Down", a Gotthard song from the 2003 album Human Zoo
- "Long Way Down", a Lottery Winners song from the 2023 album Anxiety Replacement Therapy
- "Long Way Down", a Mickie James song from the 2013 album Somebody's Gonna Pay
- "Long Way Down", a One Direction song from the 2015 album Made in the A.M.
- "Long Way Down", a Sara Evans song from the 2017 album Words
- Long Way Down (book), a 2017 book by Jason Reynolds

== See also ==
- A Long Way Down, a 2005 novel by Nick Hornby
  - A Long Way Down (film), a 2014 film by Pascal Chaumeil based on Nick Hornby's novel
