= Set Sail =

Set Sail may refer to:

- Set Sail (The Movement album), 2008
- Set Sail (North Mississippi Allstars album), 2022
