= On Your Feet (The Movement album) =

Studio album by The Movement
- Released: March 2004
- Studio: Pat Casey's Modern Music, Columbia, South Carolina
- Genre: Rock; reggae; hip hop; acoustic

The Movement chronology
| On Your Feet (2004) | Alive at Home (2006) |

Professional ratings
Review scores
| Source | Rating |
|---|---|
| The Pier | link |

On Your Feet is The Movement's first studio album, recorded at Pat Casey's Modern Music Studios in Columbia, South Carolina and released in March 2004. The recording, mixing and tracking were all completed in three separate eight-hour sessions in the studio. All of the beats for the album were made on a drum machine "in about a day".

On Your Feet is generally considered to be a mainstay of the rock/reggae genre and is listed at number nine on The Pier's 10 Essential Rock Reggae Albums.

== Track listing ==
All tracks by Jordan Miller, Jon Ruff, and Josh Swain.

1. "Intro" – 1:14
2. "Hola" – 4:06
3. "On Your Feet... A Dog's Industry" – 3:56
4. "Scary" – 5:37
5. "Down Down" – 4:20
6. "To the Moon and Back" – 5:59
7. "No Wood" – 2:26
8. "Cold Outside" – 3:51
9. "Wolves" – 3:42
10. "Fault" – 4:45
11. "Livest Shit" – 5:10
12. "The Ballad of Two J's" – 5:59
13. "The Connection" (feat. Lyrikal Buddah) – 6:08
14. "Purpose" – 6:18.

== Personnel ==
- Lyrikal Buddah - vocals
- Jordan Miller - guitar, vocals
- Jon Ruff - turntables
- Josh Swain - bass, guitar, vocals
