= Alive at Home =

Live album by The Movement
- Released: January 2006
- Venue: Headliners Mainstage, Columbia, South Carolina
- Genre: Rock; reggae; hip hop; acoustic

The Movement chronology
| On Your Feet (2004) | Alive at Home (2006) | Set Sail (2008) |

Alive at Home is a live album by the Movement. It was recorded at Headliners Mainstage in Columbia, South Carolina and released in January 2006.

== Track listing ==
1. Habit – 4:33
2. Scream – 4:31
3. Scary – 5:45
4. Mexico – 4:25
5. On Your Feet – 3:39
6. Fu-Gee-La (The Fugees cover) – 2:54
7. Green Girl – 4:49
8. Roots, Rock, Reggae (Bob Marley cover) – 3:48
9. End of the Road – 5:16
10. Down Down – 4:20
11. Cold Outside – 3:39
12. Throwdown – 3:43
13. Hola – 4:27
14. I Know – 4:20
15. Livest Shit – 5:31
16. Purpose – 7:10

== Personnel ==
- Jordan Miller – guitar, vocals, band member
- Jon Ruff – turntables, band member
- Josh Swain – bass guitar, guitar, vocals, band member
