= What's My Name (Steady B album) =

Studio album by Steady B
- Released: 1987
- Studio: Studio 4 Recording (Philadelphia, PA)
- Genre: Hip-hop
- Label: Pop Art; Jive
- Producer: Lawrence Goodman

Steady B chronology
Bring the Beat Back (1986)	What's My Name (1987)	Let the Hustlers Play (1988)

Professional ratings
Review scores
Source	Rating
AllMusic	3/5 stars
RapReviews	6.5/10

What's My Name is the second studio album by American rapper Steady B. It was released in 1987 through Pop Art/Jive Records. Recording sessions took place at Studio 4 Recording in Philadelphia. Production was handled by Lawrence Goodman. The album peaked at number 149 on the Billboard 200 and number 49 on the Top R&B/Hip-Hop Albums charts in the United States.

== Track listing ==
No.	Title	Writer(s)	Length
1.	"Believe Me Das Bad"	Warren McGlone; Terrence Thomas; Lawrence Goodman	4:27
2.	"What's My Name"	McGlone	3:59
3.	"Don't Disturb This Groove"	McGlone; Goodman	4:18
4.	"Funky Drummer"	McGlone	3:56
5.	"Use Me"	McGlone; Goodman	4:15
6.	"Gangster Rockin'"	McGlone; Goodman	4:16
7.	"My Benz"	McGlone	3:37
8.	"Hold It Now"	McGlone	4:03
9.	"Rockin' Music"	McGlone; Thomas; Goodman	4:00
10.	"Introduction"	McGlone	1:03
11.	"The Hill Top"	McGlone; Thomas	2:23
12.	"Rong Ho'le"	McGlone; Thomas; Goodman	3:33

== Personnel ==
- Warren "Steady B" McGlone – vocals, mixing assistant
- Terence "DJ Tat Money" Thomas – scratches
- Lawrence Goodman – producer, arranger, mixing
- Joe "The Butcher" Nicolo – engineering, mixing assistant
- Jim "Jiff" Hinger – engineering assistant
- Doug Rowell – photography

== Charts ==
Chart (1987)	Peak position
US Billboard 200	149
US Top R&B/Hip-Hop Albums (Billboard)	49
