= Twentythree =

Studio album by Tristan Prettyman
- Released: August 2, 2005
- Genre: Folk-pop
- Length: 36:50
- Label: VRA
- Producer: Josh Deutsch

Tristan Prettyman chronology
The Love EP (2003)	Twentythree (2005)	Hello...x (2008)

Twentythree (alternatively styled "twentythree") is the major label debut album of American singer-songwriter Tristan Prettyman. It was released by Virgin Records America on August 2, 2005. It peaked at No. 24 on Billboard's Top Heatseekers chart. The album was named, at least in part, for the fact that it was released after Prettyman's 23rd birthday. Also, both she and her then-boyfriend, musician Jason Mraz, were born on the 23rd (of May 1982 and June 1977 respectively). Mraz would later propose to Prettyman on December 23, 2010.

== Critical reception ==
Professional ratings
Review scores
Source	Rating
Rolling Stone	3/5 stars

Critical response to Twentythree was largely positive though conservative, and she drew comparisons to fellow surfer Jack Johnson. USA Today gave the album four-and-a-half stars, saying that the "singer-songwriter's breathy wisp of a voice doesn't reveal much range, technically, dynamically or otherwise", but that she does "have a gentle charm that should allow this former competitive surfer to stay afloat under the pop radar." Entertainment Weekly gave the album a B, calling it "husky, pleasant Introspection Lite." People magazine said that "with her soothing folk-pop sounds and sweetly understated vocals, this San Diego singer-songwriter is poised to be the next Jewel", finally giving the album three stars. Christian Hoard with Rolling Stone commented that "Prettyman may not quite have found her voice, but on 'Twentythree' her nice-girl daydreams sound awfully sweet."

== Track listing ==
1. "Love Love Love" (Tristan Prettyman) – 3:25
2. "Always Feel This Way" (Prettyman) – 2:55
3. "The Story" (Prettyman) – 2:56
4. "Electric" (Prettyman) – 2:55
5. "Shy That Way (Prettyman, Jason Mraz) – 3:31
  - feat. Jason Mraz
6. "Please" (Prettyman) – 3:10
7. "Breathe" (Prettyman) – 3:13
8. "Song for the Rich" (Prettyman) – 3:43
9. "Smoke" (Prettyman) – 3:45
10. "Melting" (Prettyman) – 3:37
11. "Simple As It Should Be" (Prettyman, Jesse Harris) – 3:49
  - feat. G. Love
12. "Mess" (Prettyman) – 3:50
  - (iTunes bonus track)
13. "November" (Prettyman) – 3:23
  - (iTunes bonus track)

The songs "November" and "Song for the Rich" were also on her four-song demo.

== Charts ==
Chart performance for Twentythree
Chart (2005)	Peak position
Dutch Albums (Album Top 100)	90
