= G. Love & Special Sauce =

American rock band

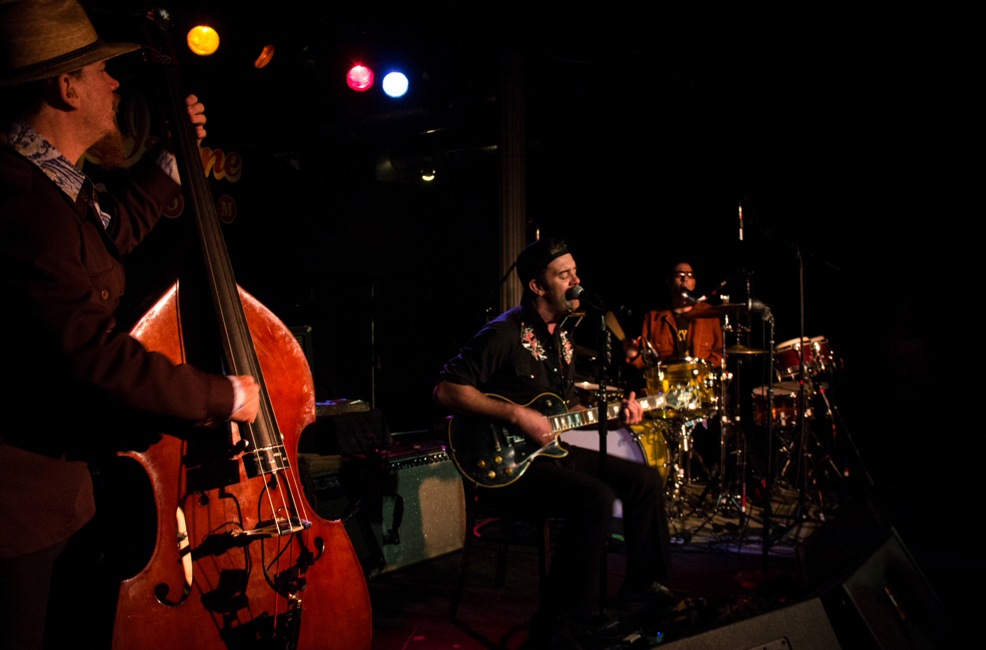
- G. Love & Special Sauce in 2015

Background information
- Origin: Philadelphia, Pennsylvania, U.S.
- Genres: Blues; hip hop; rock; soul
- Years active: 1992–present
- Labels: Brushfire, 550, Okeh
- Members: Garrett "G. Love" Dutton; Chuck Treece; Jim "Jimi Jazz" Prescott
- Past members: Jeffrey "Houseman" Clemens; Mark Boyce; Timo Shanko

G. Love & Special Sauce is an American rock band from Philadelphia. They are known for their unique, "sloppy", and "laid back" sound that encompasses blues, hip hop, rock, and soul. The band features Garrett Dutton, better known as G. Love; Chuck Treece on drums; and Jim Prescott on bass.

== History ==
The band formed in January 1993, when Dutton was performing at a Boston bar, The Tam O'Shanter, and met drummer Jeffrey Clemens. Beginning as a duo, they were joined a few months later by bassist Jim Prescott, and became the house band at The Plough and Stars in nearby Cambridge, Massachusetts. In 1994, they released their self-titled debut album on Okeh Records. On the strength of the single "Cold Beverage", due in part to the song's rotation on MTV, the album nearly went gold. Trying to capitalize on the success of the album, the group subsequently toured heavily, eventually landing a spot on the H.O.R.D.E. tour.

In 1995, they released their follow-up album Coast to Coast Motel. Although it did not sell as well as the first album, it is considered by many critics as the stronger of the two. On tour following the release of the second album, the group nearly broke up, due to disagreements about the group's finances. Deciding on a hiatus the three members went their separate ways, working on various side projects.

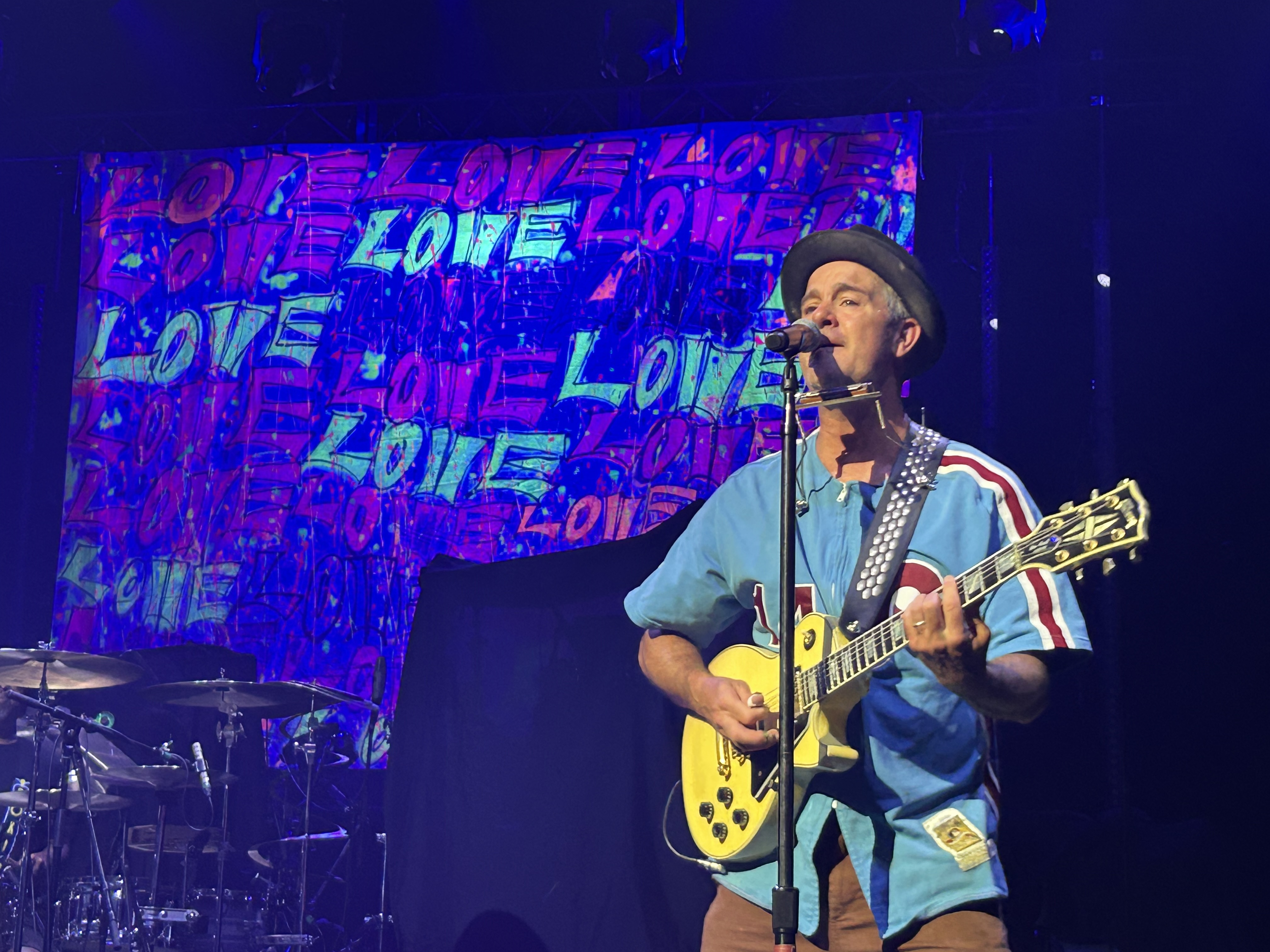
G Love and Special Sauce performing at Ovation Hall in Atlantic City, July 22, 2023

By October 1997, the group had reconciled their differences and released their third album, Yeah, It's That Easy, which along with their own work, showcased their collaboration with several other bands and musicians, including All Fellas Band, Philly Cartel, King's Court, and Dr. John. This soul-influenced album was more similar to their debut album than their previous release.

Soon after G. Love & Special Sauce set out on another world tour, returning to Philadelphia in 1999 for the release of their fourth album, Philadelphonic. Philadelphonic was followed up with Electric Mile in 2001, an album that shows the wide-ranging influences of the trio, incorporating hip-hop, funk, psychedelica, blues, and soul in equal and ambitious measure. Ever the road band, Mile was followed by extensive touring. During this time they performed as the house band for Comedy Central's show Turn Ben Stein On, which ran 1999–2001.

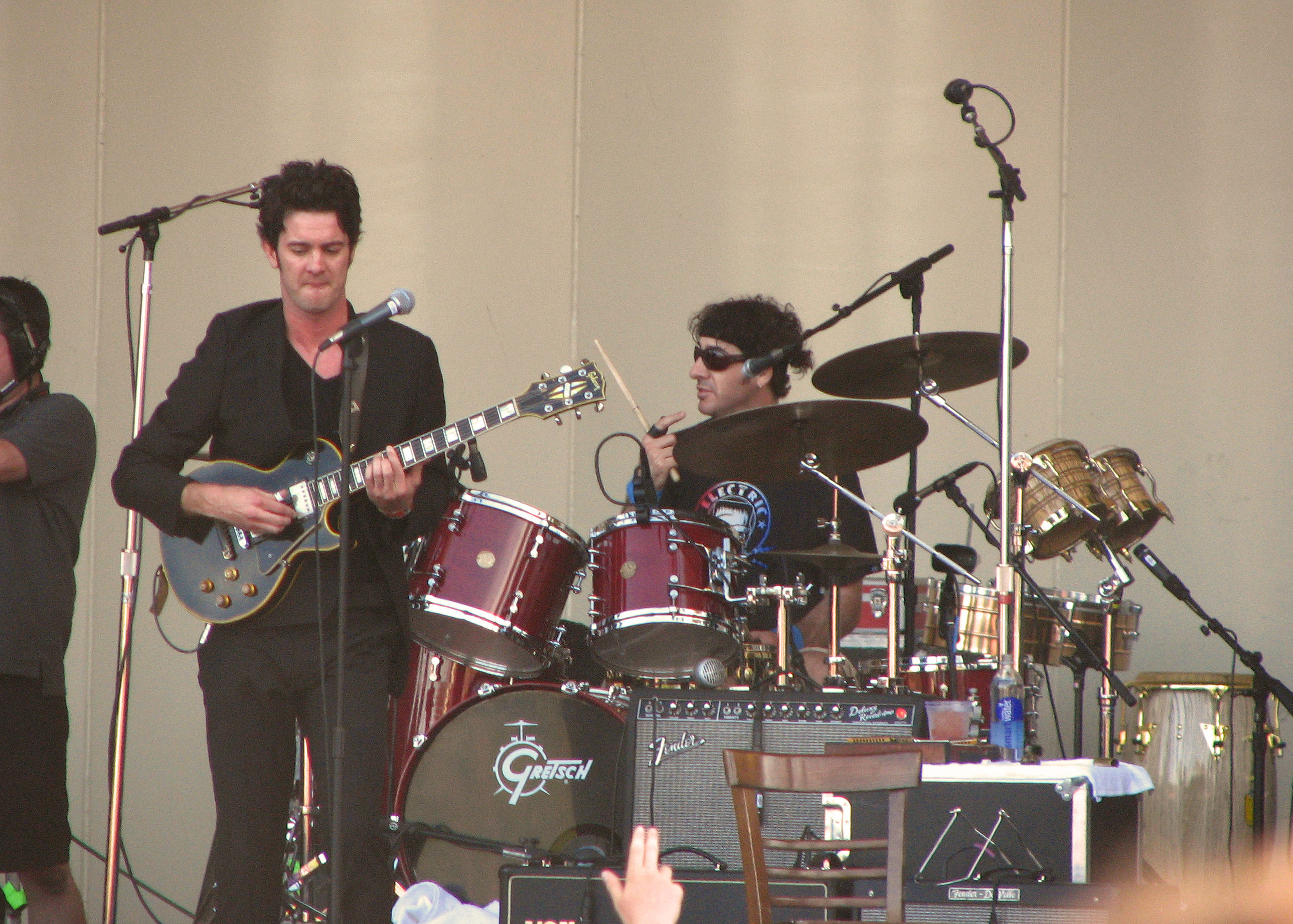
G. Love & Special Sauce in 2007

In summer 2005, the band featured in an advertisement for the launch of Coca-Cola Zero, featuring the group's own unique version of the noted Coca-Cola advertising song "I'd Like to Teach the World to Sing". On June 24, 2008, Superhero Brother was released. On January 15, 2009, G. Love announced on the band's website that bassist Jimi "Jazz" Prescott is no longer a member of the band. On January 21, 2014, G. Love posted a release containing the announcement of the album Sugar and stating that Jimi Prescott had returned to the band. In 2014, automobile manufacturer Cadillac released a commercial featuring "Come Up Man".

=== Solo albums ===
G. Love has released four solo albums. His first, The Hustle, was the first G. Love release under Jack Johnson's Brushfire Records banner. Johnson had been a guest on the Special Sauce album Philadelphonic. G. Love performed a series of shows in 2004 with Jack Johnson and fellow Brushfire Records artist Donavon Frankenreiter, and the trio also found time to issue a live EP. His solo albums include:

- The Hustle (Brushfire Records – 2004) No. 100 US
- Lemonade (Brushfire Records – 2006) No. 39 US
- Fixin' to Die (Brushfire Records – 2011) No. 36 US
- The Juice (Philadelphonic Records – January 17, 2020)

== Musical style ==
The band's music encompasses blues, hip hop, alternative rock, blues rock, folk, funk, Philadelphia soul, psychedelic rock, rock and roll and soul.

== Members ==
=== Current ===
- Garrett Dutton as "G. Love" – vocals, guitar, harmonica (1993–present)
- Chuck Treece – drums, vocals (2022–present)
- Jim Prescott as "Jimi Jazz" – string bass (1993–2009, 2014–present)

=== Former ===
- Jeffrey Clemens as "Houseman" – drums, vocals (1993–2020)
- Mark Boyce – keyboards (2006–2011)
- Timo Shanko – string bass (2009–2013)

=== Tech credits ===
- Randy Grosclaude – lighting designer for The Hustle tour

== Discography ==
=== Studio albums – with Special Sauce ===
- G. Love and Special Sauce (Okeh – 1994) No. 32 Heatseekers
- Coast to Coast Motel (Okeh – 1995) No. 122 US No. 3 Heatseekers
- Yeah, It's That Easy (Okeh – 1997) No. 120 US No. 3 Heatseekers
- Philadelphonic (550 Music – 1999) No. 113 US no. 1 Heatseekers
- Electric Mile (550 Music – 2001) No. 138 US no. 4 Heatseekers
- Superhero Brother (Brushfire Records – 2008) No. 63 US
- Sugar (Brushfire Records – 2014) No. 49 US
- Love Saves the Day (Brushfire Records – October 30, 2015)
- Philadelphia Mississippi (Philadelphonic Records – June 24, 2022)
- Ode To R.L. (GLove Records – November 14, 2025)

=== Studio albums – solo ===
- The Hustle (Brushfire Records – 2004) No. 100 US
- Lemonade (Brushfire Records – 2006) No. 39 US
- Fixin' to Die (Brushfire Records – 2011) No. 36 US
- The Juice (Philadelphonic Records – January 17, 2020)

=== Bootlegs, demos or outtake albums ===
- Back in the Day (1993)
- In the Kings Court (1996/1998)
- Oh Yeah (1998) [solo]
- G. Love Has Gone Country (1998)
- Rappin' Blues EP (1999)
- Front Porch Loungin' (2000)
- Long Way Down (Philadelphonic Records – 2009)

=== Compilation albums ===
- The Best of G. Love and Special Sauce (Sony – 2002)
- Playlist: The Very Best of G. Love & Special Sauce (The Okeh Years) (Epic/Legacy – 2013)

=== Live albums ===
- A Year and a Night with G. Love and Special Sauce CD/DVD (2007)
- Live at Boulder Theater 2xLP Limited Edition(2019)

=== Singles ===
Year	Title	Chart positions		Album
Year	Title	U.S. Modern Rock	US AAA	Album
1994	"Cold Beverage"	—	—	G. Love & Special Sauce
1994	"Baby's Got Sauce"	—	—	G. Love & Special Sauce
1995	"Kiss and Tell"	—	—	Coast to Coast Motel
1995	"Sweet Sugar Mama"	—	—	Coast to Coast Motel
1997	"Stepping Stones"	30	—	Yeah, It's That Easy
1997	"I-76"	—	—	Yeah, It's That Easy
1999	"Rodeo Clowns"	39	—	Philadelphonic
1999	"Dreamin'"	—	—	Philadelphonic
2001	"Free at Last"	—	—	Electric Mile
2001	"Unified"	—	—	Electric Mile
2004	"Astronaut"	37	—	The Hustle
2005	"Booty Call"	—	—	The Hustle
2005	"Love"	—	—	The Hustle
2006	"Hot Cookin'"	—	22	Lemonade
2007	"Beautiful"	—	—	Lemonade
2008	"Peace, Love, and Happiness"	—	15	Superhero Brother
2011	"Fixin' to Die"	—	20	Fixin' to Die
2014	"Nothing Quite Like Home"	—	—	Sugar
2015	"Muse" (featuring Citizen Cope)	—	26	Love Saves the Day
2019	"Go Crazy" (featuring Keb' Mo')	—	30	The Juice

=== Music videos ===
Year	Song	Director
1994	"Baby's Got Sauce"	Alain Duplantier
1994	"Cold Beverage"	Mark Romanek
1995	"Kiss & Tell"	Tamra Davis
1997	"I-76"	Liz Friedlander
