= Coast to Coast Motel =

Studio album by G. Love & Special Sauce
- Released: September 19, 1995
- Studio: Kingsway; Sea-Saint; Chez Flames (New Orleans, LA)
- Genre: Rock; blues
- Length: 48:40
- Label: Okeh; Epic
- Producer: Jim Dickinson; Keith Keller; Special Sauce

G. Love & Special Sauce chronology
G. Love and Special Sauce (1994)	Coast to Coast Motel (1995)	Yeah, It's That Easy (1997)

Singles from Album
- 1. "Kiss and Tell" Released: 1995; 2. "Sweet Sugar Mama" Released: 1995

Coast to Coast Motel is the second studio album by the American band G. Love & Special Sauce. It was released on September 19, 1995, via Okeh/Epic Records. The album was produced by Special Sauce, Jim Dickinson, and Keith Keller. It features contributions from BroDeeva, Jim Dickinson and Rebirth Brass Band.

The album peaked at number 122 on the Billboard 200, number 83 on the Dutch Album Top 100 and number 22 on the Official Hip Hop and R&B Albums Chart in the UK.

== Critical reception ==
Professional ratings
Review scores
Source	Rating
AllMusic	4/5 stars
Robert Christgau	(neither)
The Encyclopedia of Popular Music	4/5 stars
(The New) Rolling Stone Album Guide	3/5 stars

Jessica Parker of Dallas Observer called Coast to Coast Motel "almost completely stripped of the hip-hop that so pleasantly tempered the straightforward blues of the first album". Trouser Press wrote that the group "establishes an easy mastery of understated rhythm and harmonic economy". SF Weekly called it "steeped in the feel-good blues vibe of the G. Love live experience".

== Track listing ==
No.	Title	Writer(s)	Producer(s)	Length
1.	"Sweet Sugar Mama"	Garrett Dutton; Jeffrey Clemens; Jim Prescott	Jim Dickinson; Special Sauce	4:05
2.	"Leaving the City"	Dutton	Jim Dickinson; Special Sauce	3:40
3.	"Nancy"	Dutton; Clemens; Prescott	Jim Dickinson; Special Sauce	3:21
4.	"Kiss and Tell"	Dutton	Jim Dickinson; Special Sauce	3:14
5.	"Chains #3"	Dutton; Clemens; Prescott	Jim Dickinson; Special Sauce	2:58
6.	"Sometimes"	Dutton	Jim Dickinson; Special Sauce	4:23
7.	"Everybody"	Dutton	Jim Dickinson; Special Sauce	3:40
8.	"Soda Pop"	Dutton; Clemens	Keith Keller; Special Sauce	3:49
9.	"Bye Bye Baby"	Dutton	Keith Keller; Special Sauce	4:39
10.	"Tomorrow Night"	Dutton	Jim Dickinson; Special Sauce	4:55
11.	"Small Fish"	Dutton; Clemens; Prescott	Jim Dickinson; Special Sauce	5:21
12.	"Coming Home"	Dutton	Keith Keller; Special Sauce	4:35
Total length:				48:40

== Personnel ==
- Garrett "G. Love" Dutton – vocals, guitar, harmonica
- Jeffrey "Thunderhouse" Clemens – background vocals, drums, producer
- Jimi "Jazz" Prescott – double bass, producer
- BroDeeva – background vocals
- Jim Dickinson – electric piano, producer
- Rebirth Brass Band – horns
- Keith Keller – producer, mixing
- Bob Krusen – engineering
- Don Smith – mixing
- Roger Branch – engineering assistant
- Richard Hasal – engineering assistant
- Trina Shoemaker – engineering assistant
- Stephen Marcussen – mastering
- Chika Azuma – art direction, design
- Ron Kruit – photography
- Ski Williams – illustrations
- Michael Caplan – A&R

== Charts ==
Chart (1995–96)	Peak position
Dutch Albums (Album Top 100)	83
UK R&B Albums (Official Charts)	22
US Billboard 200	122
