= Let the Hustlers Play =

Studio album by Steady B
- Released: September 13, 1988
- Recorded: 1988
- Studio: Studio 4 (Philadelphia, PA); Power Play Studios (New York, NY); Victory Studios
- Genre: Golden age hip-hop
- Length: 42:23
- Label: Pop Art; Jive; RCA
- Producer: Chuck Nice; KRS-One; Lawrence Goodman; Steady B

Steady B chronology
What's My Name (1987)	Let the Hustlers Play (1988)	Going Steady (1989)

Singles from Let the Hustlers Play
- 1. "Let the Hustlers Play" Released: 1988; 2. "Serious" Released: 1988

Professional ratings
Review scores
Source	Rating
AllMusic	2.5/5 stars

Let the Hustlers Play is the third studio album by American rapper Steady B. It was released in 1988 through Pop Art/Jive Records with distribution via RCA Records. Recording sessions took place at Studio Four in Philadelphia, Power Play Studios in New York City and Victory Studios in Pennsylvania. Production was handled by Lawrence Goodman, Chuck Nice, KRS-One, and Steady B himself. The album debuted at number 193 on the Billboard 200 and peaked at number 56 on the Top R&B/Hip-Hop Albums charts in the United States. It was supported by two singles: "Let the Hustlers Play" and "Serious", with the latter reaching number 92 on the UK singles chart.

== Track listing ==
No.	Title	Writer(s)	Producer(s)	Length
1.	"Let the Hustlers Play"	Warren McGlone; Lawrence Goodman; Walter Griggs	Lawrence Goodman; Chuck Nice	4:25
2.	"Certified Dope"	McGlone; Goodman; Terrence Thomas	Lawrence Goodman; Steady B	3:25
3.	"The Undertaker"	McGlone; Lawrence Parker	KRS-One	5:34
4.	"I Got Cha"	McGlone; Goodman; Thomas; Rob Waller	Lawrence Goodman	3:20
5.	"Turn It Loose"	McGlone; Parker	KRS-One	4:12
6.	"Ya Know My Rucka"	McGlone; Goodman; Griggs	Lawrence Goodman; Chuck Nice	4:22
7.	"Serious"	McGlone; Parker	KRS-One	3:25
8.	"Do What You Wanna Do"	McGlone; Goodman; Waller; Thomas	Lawrence Goodman; Chuck Nice	4:00
9.	"Who's Makin' Ya Dance?"	McGlone; Griggs	Lawrence Goodman; Chuck Nice	4:07
10.	"On the Real Tip"	McGlone; Goodman	Lawrence Goodman; Steady B	2:28
11.	"Through Thick-N-Thin"	McGlone	Lawrence Goodman; Steady B	3:05
Total length:				42:23

== Charts ==
Chart (1988)	Peak position
US Billboard 200	193
US Top R&B/Hip-Hop Albums (Billboard)	56
