= Cedar + Gold =

Studio album by Tristan Prettyman
- Released: October 2, 2012
- Genre: Pop
- Label: Capitol
- Producer: Greg Wells

Tristan Prettyman chronology
Hello...x (2008)	Cedar + Gold (2012)

Singles from Cedar + Gold
- 1. "My Oh My" Released: June 20, 2012; 2. "I Was Gonna Marry You" Released: October 2, 2012

Cedar + Gold is the third studio album by American singer-songwriter Tristan Prettyman. It was released on October 2, 2012 by Capitol Records and peaked at number 47 on the Billboard 200 albums chart. Much of the album's lyrical content was influenced by Prettyman's on-again, off-again relationship with fellow singer-songwriter Jason Mraz.

== Background and composition ==
Prettyman began a four-year hiatus from music after extensively touring in support of her 2008 album Hello...x. She traveled to Bali, Australia, New York City, and Costa Rica, after which she was diagnosed with vocal cord polyps. She returned to songwriting following surgery. While Hello was partly inspired by her breakup with Jason Mraz, Cedar + Gold was recorded after the couple reunited, got engaged, and then split again. Mraz had told The Daily Beast about the breakup, and Prettyman reacted by writing songs to tell her side of the story. "Some of these songs were written in 'fuck you' moments. I felt trapped," Prettyman said. In the song "Glass Jar", a reference to the jar that once held her engagement ring, she recalls the moment Mraz proposed to her. "I Was Gonna Marry You" is a kiss-off to Mraz in which Prettyman explains feeling shocked at the breakup. She examines the relationship as a whole in the nearly-six-minute album closer "Never Say Never", which incorporates spoken word and concludes with pedal steel guitar. First single "My Oh My" was released in June 2012 in advance of the album. The music video for the album's second single "I Was Gonna Marry You" was released in October. On January 18, 2013, Nylon premiered the lyric video for "Rebound".

== Critical reception ==
Allmusic writer Matt Collar remarked that the songs on Cedar + Gold "are both personal and universally relatable, with melodies that stick in your head and tug at your heart." Collar added that the album "features some of the most introspective, self-examinational, and emotionally raw songs of [Prettyman's] career." Michelle Morgante of the Associated Press wrote that Prettyman "sings with an apparent honesty that is liberating", and that instead of anger, her voice displays "both fragility and strength, retrospection and introspection, and through it all there is love." KC Libman of LA Weekly suggested that the album "moves away from the 'surfer girl' aesthetic of her previous records and into darker, more mature territory." Alessandra Donnelly of The Aquarian Weekly said the album "blends together as you listen on without having any truly outstanding songs", and that while Prettyman "has a naturally smooth sound [...] her work does not leave the zone of generic comfort." Musicperk.com rated the album 8.5/10 quoting "This album’s clearly a masterpiece".

== Track listing ==
No.	Title	Writer(s)	Length
1.	"Second Chance"	Tristan Prettyman	3:34
2.	"Say Anything"	Prettyman	3:56
3.	"My Oh My"	Prettyman	3:40
4.	"I Was Gonna Marry You"	Prettyman	3:12
5.	"Quit You"	Prettyman	3:08
6.	"Bad Drug"	Prettyman	2:50
7.	"Come Clean"	Bleu McAuley, Prettyman	3:53
8.	"Glass Jar"	Josh Grange, Prettyman	4:52
9.	"When You Come Down"	Prettyman	3:24
10.	"Deepest Ocean Blue"	Prettyman	5:31
11.	"The Rebound"	Prettyman	2:28
12.	"Never Say Never"	Prettyman	5:54

== Personnel ==
- Greg Wells – drums, piano, bass, guitars, programming, keyboards, percussion, banjo, glockenspiel, celeste
- Josh Grange – pedal steel and guitars
- Tristan Prettyman
  - Guitars on "Say Anything", "My Oh My", "Quit You", "Glass Jar" and "Deepest Ocean Blue"
  - Programming on "Bad Drug"
- Greg Leisz – Guitars on "Say Anything", "I Was Gonna Marry You", "Come Clean" and "Never Say Never"
- Jim Keltner – Drums on "Quit You"

== Charts ==
Chart (2012)	Peak position
US Billboard 200	47
US Digital Albums (Billboard)	19
US Top Rock Albums (Billboard)	19
Japanese Albums Chart	220
