= The Movement (reggae band) =

American reggae band

- Origin: Columbia, South Carolina, US
- Genres: Reggae; Dub; Reggae rock Hip Hop; Acoustic
- Years active: 2003–present
- Labels: Rootfire Cooperative; Ineffable Music
- Members: Joshua Swain; Jason Schmidt; Gary Jackson; Matt Goodwin Kyle “Ras” Jerome
- Past members: Jordan Miller; DJ Riggles (Jon Ruff); John Bowling; Ross Bogan
- Website: www.themovementvibe.com

The Movement is an American reggae band originally formed in Columbia, South Carolina, in 2003. The two founding members, Josh Swain and Jordan Miller, then relocated to Philadelphia, Pennsylvania, where they acquired a live rhythm section in the form of local Philadelphia musicians Jay Schmidt and Gary Jackson. The band has released six studio albums. Their music is commonly described as a fusion of rock, reggae, hip hop and acoustic music.

== History ==
=== Formation (trio years) and On Your Feet (2003–2007) ===
The Movement began in 2003 when childhood friends Josh Swain and Jordan Miller reconnected in their hometown of Columbia, South Carolina, to write songs as a duo. With Swain on guitar and Miller on congas, the two utilized a drum machine to complete their sound. Soon after, Jon Ruff, known as "DJ Riggles", joined the group.

In March 2004, they released their first studio album, On Your Feet, which was recorded and mixed at Pat Casey's Modern Music Studios in Columbia, South Carolina. This "alternative reggae" album has proved a mainstay of the reggae/rock genre and is listed at #9 on The Pier's 10 Essential Reggae Rock Albums.

=== Set Sail and subsequent years (2008–2010) ===
The band continued to build their following with nonstop touring throughout the United States. They enjoyed success in opening for national acts such as Steel Pulse, Blues Traveler, Slightly Stoopid, The Wailers, Ludacris, G.Love & Special Sauce, Common, Long Beach Shortbus, The Wu Tang Clan, SOJA, and 311.

Swain and Miller relocated to Philadelphia to begin recording what would become their second studio album, 2008's Set Sail at Philadelphonic Studios with producer Chris DiBeneditto, who had worked with G.Love & Special Sauce, Slightly Stoopid and The Expendables. DJ Riggles contributed heavily to the album, but left the band before it was released.

DiBeneditto contacted local drummer Gary Jackson to sit in with Swain and Miller. The three hit it off immediately and Jackson brought in his friend, guitarist Jay Schmidt, to play bass. The release of Set Sail proved to be a turning point in their careers and propelled the band into further nonstop touring. Set Sail had achieved the #7 spot on iTunes' Top 100 Reggae Albums.

=== Departure of Swain ===
However, in 2010, Swain left the band while on tour in Arizona. He decided to move to Denver, Colorado, with his girlfriend at the time. Miller kept The Movement marching on by touring for two years.

The band added keyboardist John Bowling who was previously in a band with Miller in 2006, called The Executives.

=== One More Night (2010) ===
They released their third studio album, One More Night on March 20, 2010. This was the only album featuring Miller as the sole songwriter. It peaked at #1 on the Billboard reggae album chart. Bowling said, three of the songs from One More Night: "When The Feeling Goes Away", "Lonely At The Top" and "Across the Bridge" were songs that were originally written and performed while he and Bowling played together in The Executives.

=== Departure of Miller ===
After only one month One More Night was released, Miller told his bandmates he wanted to quit the band he co-founded. He needed to break away for personal reasons and find a relationship to his own health and well-being. He needed to "get home, get healthy, and spend time with his family". So he walked away from the band abruptly just two hours before a scheduled performance at Wofford College in Spartanburg, South Carolina, on April 20, 2012. Even though the members were surprised and hurt by Miller's decision, there was no ill will towards him. Miller also wanted a solo career, which was in the works with The Movement's former manager Marshall Lowe.

=== Reformation with Swain and Side By Side (2012–2014) ===
Swain's leaving would only be a temporary hiatus, as he returned in 2012 to replace Miller as the lead singer and guitarist.

The reformed trio, with Swain newly at the helm, relocated to San Diego, California, to record their fourth album Side by Side, which was released in August 2013, and entered the Billboard Reggae Albums Chart at #2.

In February 2014, members of the band were arrested for possession of marijuana. Later that year, the band released "Beneath The Palms", a surprise acoustic album on Thanksgiving Day as a gift to their fans.

=== Golden (2016) ===
In April 2015, the band released the single, "Rescue" and announced plans to record another album, their fifth LP. The band's next album, Golden, was released in April 2016 on Rootfire Cooperative. They collaborated with a John Brown's Body, Matt Goodwin who played keyboards on the album. It topped the Billboard Reggae Albums chart. It reached #1 on iTunes, as well. The album was also voted 2016 Album of the Year by Surf Roots Radio. And later that year, keyboardist Ross Bogan joined the band in the spring to go on tour.

=== Ways of the World (2019) ===
The band released their sixth album Ways of the World on June 7, 2019. It was produced by musician/reggae music producer John Grey (a.k.a. "Johnny Cosmic"). It features artists Stick Figure, Iya Terra, Jacob Hemphill of SOJA, and Chali 2na of Jurassic 5. Also known as WOTW, the album peaked at #1 on the Billboard charts for Reggae Albums. Upon touring in late 2019 Swain relapsed into alcoholism resulting in him being rushed to a Denver hospital over alcohol withdrawal complications. The band now has a strict sober rule on board their tour bus.

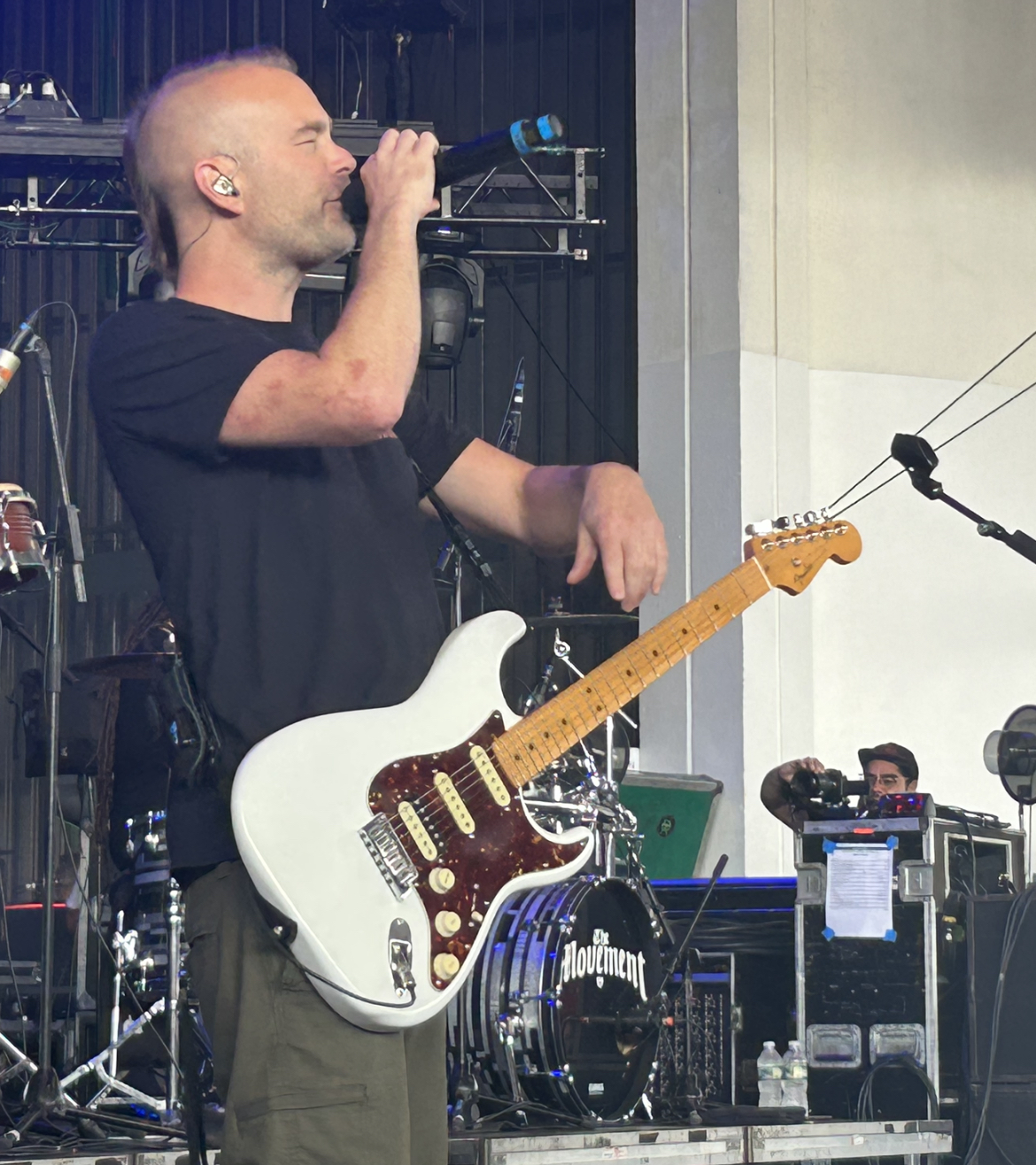
The Movement perform at PNC Bank Arts Center in New Jersey on August 17, 2023.

The Movement was featured as one of many reggae bands on Collie Buddz riddim album, Cali Roots Riddim 2020 with their single, "Alien", which was produced by Buddz and mixed by Stick Figure's touring guitarist, producer Johnny Cosmic.

In 2021, The Movement was one of several reggae and punk bands on The House That Bradley Built, a charity compilation honoring Sublime's lead singer Bradley Nowell, helping musicians with substance abuse. They covered Sublime's song "Get Out!"

=== Always With Me (2022) ===
The Movement recorded their seventh studio album, "Always With Me", which was released on July 29, 2022. It is the band's first self-produced album on their own R4RE Records since their 2004 debut. The album was recorded at White Star Sound, a studio located on a historic farm in the 'backwoods' outside Charlottesville, Virginia. It's also the same studio where they recorded Golden and Ways of the World. Returning to the band is long-time collaborator and former John Brown's Body member Matt Goodwin on keyboard who toured with the band after being a studio mainstay since 2016's Golden. The 15-track record features Clinton Fearon, HIRIE, Iration, Slightly Stoopid, and SOOM T.

Always With Me was "considered" for a Grammy Award nomination "Best Reggae Album" at the 65th Grammy Awards in 2023.

The Movement announced on social media the Always With Me Deluxe Album, which was released digitally on August 4, 2023. The deluxe album includes two brand new original tracks ("At the End of the Day" and "We Are Young"), five remixed songs (E.N. Young, Johnny Cosmic, Little Stranger, and IzyBeats), and a piano version of "U Don't Know Me".

The Movement was one of the many featured reggae rock artists on Crossed Heart Clothing presents Pop Punk Goes Reggae, Vol. 1, which was produced by frontman Nathan Aurora of Iya Terra. The 16-track album was released on September 15, 2023 by Ineffable Records. The band covered "Until the Day I Die" by Story of the Year.

=== Visions (2025) ===
On April 26, 2025, the band released the single "Visions" featuring Stick Figure. They released the album of the same name on July 18, 2025.

== Musical style ==
Swain and Miller assumed equal roles in leading the band as dual frontmen while showcasing their individual songwriting styles. They are often noted for their use of two-part harmonies while singing backing vocals for one another's songs. Swain talks about the band's music:

"I've always thought of it as what I like to call 'alternative reggae'. We don't feel really roots reggae. We're not rasta. It comes out a little more hip-hop, a little more rock."

— Josh Swain, The Reggae News Agency

=== Musical influences ===
Swain and Miller have cited artists of all genres, ranging from the Pixies to Sublime to Outkast to Norah Jones, as having influenced their own songwriting. In an interview with The Pier, Miller is asked where the reggae influence of their music originated:

"Through Josh. Growing up, he really developed an eclectic musical taste and is a big fan of UB40 and Sublime. I listen to a lot of different things, too, like The Pixies and a lot of underground alternative stuff. When we got together and started playing, it was the reggae that started coming out first. We really latched onto that feeling from reggae music and how it felt right to us. We love everyone from Beres Hammond to Dennis Brown to Steel Pulse. We try to take our own personal non-reggae interests and put that spin on the reggae music."

— Jordan Miller, The Pier

== Lineup ==
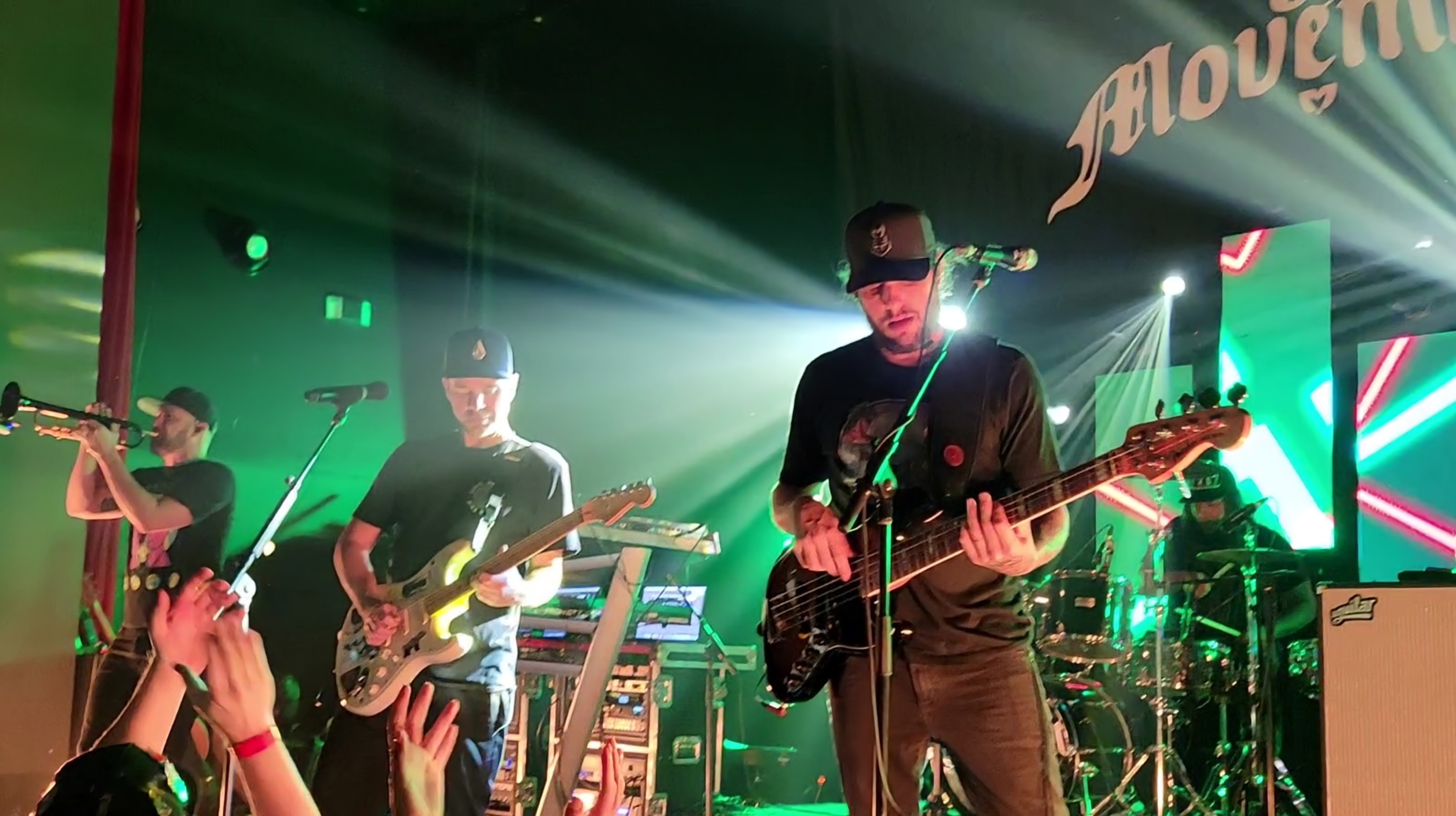
The Movement performing at the historic White Eagle Hall in Jersey City, NJ in June 2022.

=== Current members ===
- Joshua Swain – Lead Vocals, Guitar (2003–2010, 2012–present)
- Jason Schmidt – Bass (2008–present)
- Gary Jackson – Drums (2008–present)
- Matt Goodwin – Keyboard (2019–present)
- Kyle Jerome – Saxophone, Percussion (2021–present)

=== Past members ===
- Jordan Miller – Vocals/Freestyles/Guitar (2003–2012)
- Jon Ruff "DJ Riggles" – Turntables (2004–2008)
- John Bowling – Keyboard (2010–2012)
- Ross Bogan – Keyboard (2016–2019)

== Trivia ==
=== East Coast Showcase ===
In December 2006, The Movement, in their original lineup as a trio, beat out 215 other bands in the final round of the annual East Coast Showcase in Rock Hill, SC. They were awarded with over $20,000 in cash and prizes.

=== Non-Stop Hip-Hop Live ===
In September 2004, Jordan Miller won the Non-Stop Hip-Hop Live freestyle semifinal at New Brookland Tavern in Columbia, SC.

=== Band member nicknames ===
- Josh Swain – "Captain Hook" – in reference to his ability to write strong hooks.
- Jordan Miller – "Jwadi Jwad (the Wordsmither)" – in reference to his hip hop freestyling.
- Jay Schmidt – "Smiles" – in reference to his jovial demeanor.
- Gary Jackson – "Dread" – for his dreadlocks.

== Discography ==
=== Studio albums ===
The Movement Chart History
Year	Album	Label	Billboard peak
2004	On Your Feet	Self-produced	—
2008	Set Sail	Self-produced	—
2010	One More Night	Self-produced	#1
2013	Side By Side	Self-produced	#2
2016	Golden	Rootfire Cooperative	#1
2019	Ways of the World	Self-released	#1
2022	Always With Me	Rootfire Cooperative	—
2025	Visions	R4RE	—

=== Live/Acoustic albums ===
The Movement Chart History
Year	Album	Label	Billboard peak
2006	Alive at Home (Live)	Self-produced	—
2014	Beneath the Palms (Acoustic)	Self-produced	—

=== Singles ===
Title	Release date	Album
"Down Down"	2004	On Your Feet
"Another Man's Shoes"	2008	Set Sail
"Habit"	2008	Set Sail
"Mexico"	2008	Set Sail
"Ochos Rios"	2008	Set Sail
"Say Hello"	2008	Set Sail
"Set Sail"	2008	Set Sail
"Sweet Summertime"	2008	Set Sail
"Mr. Policeman"	2012	One More Night
"When the Feeling Goes Away"	2012	One More Night
"Something to Say"	2012	One More Night
"Echo"	2013	Side By Side
"Side By Side"	2013	Side By Side
"Sweet Life"	2013	Side By Side
"Rescue"	April 14, 2015	Golden
"Blinded"	2016	Golden
"Dancehall" (feat. Mr. Williamz)	February 23, 2016	Golden
"Golden" (feat. Elliot Martin)	March 22, 2016	Golden
"Fair Warning"	2016	Golden
"Habit (2016)" (feat. Collie Buddz & Bobby Hustle)	2016	Golden
"Smoke"	2016	Golden
"Through the Heart"	2016	Golden
"Wild Time"	2016	Golden
"Siren" (feat. Stick Figure)	June 30, 2017	Ways of the World
"Cool Me Down"	January 19, 2018	Ways of the World
"Loud Enough"	May 18, 2018	Ways of the World
"Break the Glass"	2019	Ways of the World
"Diamond" (feat. Jacob Hemphill of SOJA)	May 3, 2019	Ways of the World
"Honey"	2019	Ways of the World
"Life is a Circle"	2019	Ways of the World
"Orange Sky"	2019	Ways of the World
"Redwoodz" (feat. Iya Terra)	2019	Ways of the World
"Remember (The Return)"	2019	Ways of the World
"Take Me to the Ocean"	2019	Ways of the World
"The Great Discovery"	2019	Ways of the World
"Ways of the World"	2019	Ways of the World
"Rescue" (Live Acoustic)	2019	Sugarshack Sessions Selects, Vol. 1
"Alien" (feat. Collie Buddz)	April 3, 2020	Cali Roots Riddim
"Mountain" (feat. Clinton Fearon)	September 4, 2020	(Single)
"Get Out!" (Sublime cover)	January 15, 2021	The House That Bradley Built
"Siren" (Haze Street Studios Dub)	February 5, 2021	(Single)
"Sounds of Summer" (feat. Slightly Stoopid)	June 25, 2021	(Single)
"No Worry"	April 15, 2022	Always With Me (Single)
"On and On" (feat. Iration)	May 20, 2022	Always With Me (Single)
"Beg Borrow & Steal"	June 24, 2022	Always With Me (Single)
"Until the Day I Die" (Story of the Year Reggae Cover)	September 1, 2023	Pop Punk Goes Reggae, Vol. 1 (Single)
"River Guide You"	July 25, 2024	Visions
"So Cool" (feat. Nick Hexum of 311)	March 21, 2025	Visions
"Visions" (feat. Stick Figure)	April 26, 2025	Visions

=== Compilation appearances ===
- The Pier Compilation: Volume 1 (2009) – "Care (You Don't Even)"
- Sense Boardwear: Amplified – An Acoustic Collective Vol. 6 (2010) – "Using My Head"
- Music Unites: Reggae Around the World, Vol. 2 (2013) – "Echo"
- General Hydroponics, Vol.2 (2015) – "Rescue"

== Collaborations ==
Joshua Swain (The Movement) has collaborated or was featured on songs with artists and bands throughout the years.

- Little Stranger – "Fly Guy" (5/15/2024)
- Green Lion Crew – "Forward I Will Go" (4/19/2024)
- Giant Panda Guerilla Dub Squad – "Revolution" (3/29/2023)
- Pepper – "Stormtrooper" (Kona Town Revisited Remix) (feat. Kai Boy) (3/10/2023)
- Mihali – "Greater Escape" (feat. The Elovaters) (3/11/2022)
- Tribal Seeds – "Breathe Easy" (10/29/2021)
- Bobby Hustle – "Somewhere in the Middle" (8/11/2021)
- The Elovaters – "My Friend" (feat. Keznamdi) (5/21/2021)
- Dub Town Rockers – "Jump" (feat. Chali 2na) (2/12/2021)
  - Dub Town Rockers – Vámonos (3/13/2023)
- Double Tiger – "Shadow Dweller" (12/3/2020)
- Organically Good Trio – "Welcome to the Time" (12/20/2017)
