= Philadelphonic =

Studio album by G. Love & Special Sauce
- Released: August 3, 1999
- Genre: Blues; hip hop; folk; funk; Philadelphia soul
- Length: 53:49
- Label: 550 Music B00000JQFU
- Producer: T-Ray; Chris DiBeneditto

G. Love & Special Sauce chronology
Yeah, It's That Easy (1997)	Philadelphonic (1999)	Electric Mile (2001)

Singles from Philadelphonic
- 1. "Rodeo Clowns" Released: 1999; 2. "Dreamin'" Released: 1999

Professional ratings
Review scores
Source	Rating
AllMusic	2.5/5 stars
The Encyclopedia of Popular Music	4/5 stars
Entertainment Weekly	B
Spin	4/10

Philadelphonic is the fourth album by G. Love & Special Sauce, released in 1999.

== Critical reception ==
Spin wrote that the album's "beach-bound grooves are well-trodden." Entertainment Weekly called it "sleeker and more streamlined than its three predecessors." The Washington Post called Philadelphonic the band's best album, writing that it "achieves a flow so smooth that one can't tell where the Bob Dylan influences stop and the Eric B. & Rakim influences start."

== Track listing ==
1. "No Turning Back" (G. Love & Special Sauce and BRODEEVA) – 3:03
2. "Dreamin'" (G. Love, Clarence Reid, Wilie Clarke) – 3:54
  - Contains a sample from "Clean Up Woman" performed by Betty Wright
3. "Roaches" (G. Love & Special Sauce and Jake Joys) – 1:10
4. "Rodeo Clowns" (Jack Johnson) – 2:57
5. "Numbers" (G. Love) – 4:24
6. "Relax" (G. Love) – 4:15
7. "Do It for Free" (G. Love & Special Sauce and BRODEEVA) – 5:02
8. "Honor and Harmony" (G. Love) – 3:36
9. "Kick Drum" (G. Love & Special Sauce and BRODEEVA) – 2:23
10. "Friday Night" (G. Love, Jimi "Jazz" Prescott) – 4:09
11. "Rock and Roll" (G. Love & Special Sauce – 3:08
12. "Love" (G. Love, T-Ray) – 3:39
13. "Around the World (Thank You)" (G. Love & Special Sauce – 1:27
14. "Gimme Some Lovin'" (G. Love) – 2:23
  - After five minutes of silence, an unlisted track, "Amazing," begins.

== Personnel ==
- G. Love - lead vocals, guitar, and harmonica
- Jeffrey Clemens - percussion and background vocals
- Jimi "Jazz" Prescott - string bass
- Jack Johnson - acoustic guitar and vocals
- Mike Tyler - guitar
- Anton Pukshansky - organ, clavinette, and guitar
- DJ Roman - scratches
- David Gellar - percussion
- T-Ray - beats
- BRODEEVA (Chad Howlett & Earl Bryant, Jr) - vocals
