= Lemonade (G. Love album) =

Studio album by G. Love
- Released: August 1, 2006
- Recorded: 2006
- Studio: Philadelphonic Studios (Philadelphia, PA); Palais Royale (Bryn Mawr, PA); Redstar Recording (Los Angeles, CA); Swing House Studios (Los Angeles, CA); Tree Sound Studios (Atlanta, GA); Penguin Recording (Pasadena, CA); Accompong Compound (Sacramento, CA); The Audio Kitchen; The Secret Garden
- Length: 1:00:04
- Label: Brushfire
- Producer: Chris DiBeneditto; Pete Donnelly; Chief Xcel

G. Love chronology
The Hustle (2004)	Lemonade (2006)	Superhero Brother (2008)

Professional ratings
Review scores
Source	Rating
AllMusic	3.5/5 stars
IGN	8.6/10
musicOMH	3/5 stars
RapReviews	5.5/10
Slant	3.5/5 stars
The Boston Phoenix	3.5/4 stars

Lemonade is the second solo studio album by American musician G. Love. It was released on August 1, 2006 via Brushfire Records. Recording sessions took place at Philadelphonic Studios in Philadelphia, Palais Royale in Bryn Mawr, Red Star Recording and Swing House Studios in Los Angeles, Tree Sound Studios in Atlanta, Penguin Recording in Pasadena, Accompong Compound in Sacramento, The Audio Kitchen and The Secret Garden. Production was handled by Chris DiBeneditto, Pete Donnelly and Chief Xcel. It features guest appearances from Ben Harper, Blackalicious, Jack Johnson, Jasper, Lateef the Truthspeaker, Marc Broussard and Tristan Prettyman.

In the United States, the album peaked at number 39 on the Billboard 200 and number 13 on the Top Rock Albums charts.

== Track listing ==
No.	Title	Writer(s)	Producer(s)	Length
1.	"Ride"	Garrett Dutton	Chris DiBeneditto; Pete Donnelly	3:44
2.	"Ain't That Right"	Dutton	Chris DiBeneditto	3:54
3.	"Hot Cookin'"	Dutton	Chris DiBeneditto	3:44
4.	"Can't Go Back to Jersey"	Dutton; Merlo Podlewski	Chris DiBeneditto	4:07
5.	"Missing My Baby"	Dutton; Jim Prescott	Chris DiBeneditto	4:32
6.	"Holla!"	Dutton; Prescott; Cammy Kinney	Chris DiBeneditto	3:36
7.	"Banger" (featuring Blackalicious and Lateef the Truthspeaker)	Dutton; Tim Parker; Lateef Daumont; Xavier Mosley	Chris DiBeneditto; Chief Xcel	4:31
8.	"Thanks and Praise" (featuring Jasper)	Dutton; Jasper Thomas; Chris DiBeneditto	Chris DiBeneditto	4:06
9.	"Let the Music Play" (featuring Ben Harper and Marc Broussard)	Dutton; Benjamin Charles Harper; Prescott	Chris DiBeneditto	3:30
10.	"Free"	Dutton	Chris DiBeneditto	3:16
11.	"Beautiful" (featuring Tristan Prettyman)	Dutton; Tristan Prettyman	Chris DiBeneditto	3:51
12.	"Rainbow" (featuring Jack Johnson)	Dutton	Chris DiBeneditto	3:14
13.	"Breakin' Up"	Dutton	Chris DiBeneditto; Pete Donnelly	4:17
14.	"Still Hanging' Around/Sneakster"	Dutton	Chris DiBeneditto	9:42
15.	"Love"	Dutton	Chris DiBeneditto
Total length:				1:00:04

== Charts ==
Chart (2006)	Peak position
US Billboard 200	39
US Top Rock Albums (Billboard)	13
