= Tristan Prettyman =

American musician (born 1982)

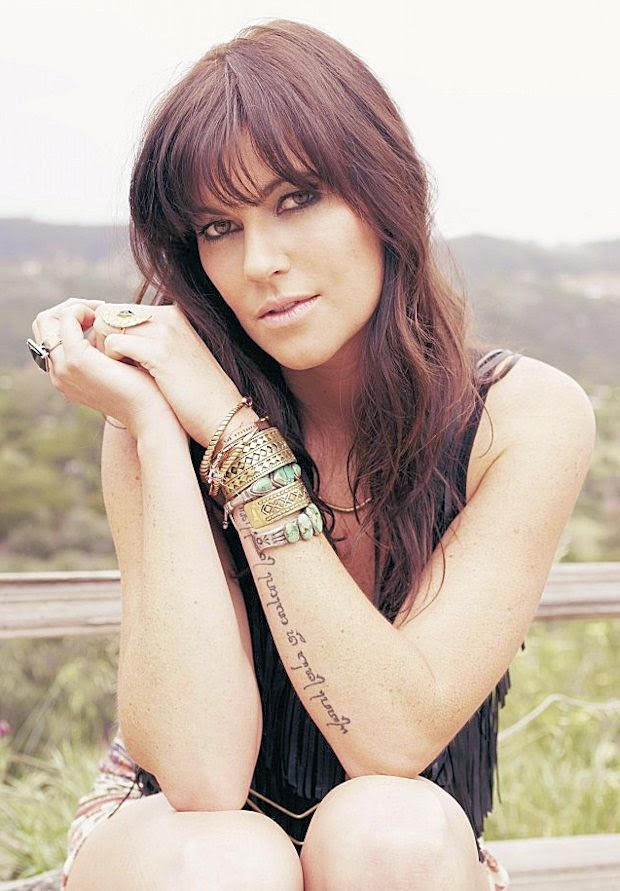
- Tristan Prettyman, 2014

Background information
- Born: Tristan Ann Prettyman; May 23, 1982 (age 44); Del Mar, California, US
- Origin: San Diego, California, US
- Instruments: Vocals, acoustic guitar
- Labels: Virgin, Capitol
- Website: www.tristanprettyman.com

Tristan Ann Prettyman (born May 23, 1982) is an American singer-songwriter from San Diego, California. She was signed to Virgin Records until 2013 and released her first major label album Twentythree on August 2, 2005, followed by her second album Hello...x which was released on April 15, 2008. Her third studio album, Cedar + Gold, was released on October 2, 2012. On October 27, 2014, Prettyman independently released an EP, Back to Home. She toured throughout the United States with Eric Hutchinson in support of his City and Sand tour during the autumn of 2014.

== Early life, family and education ==
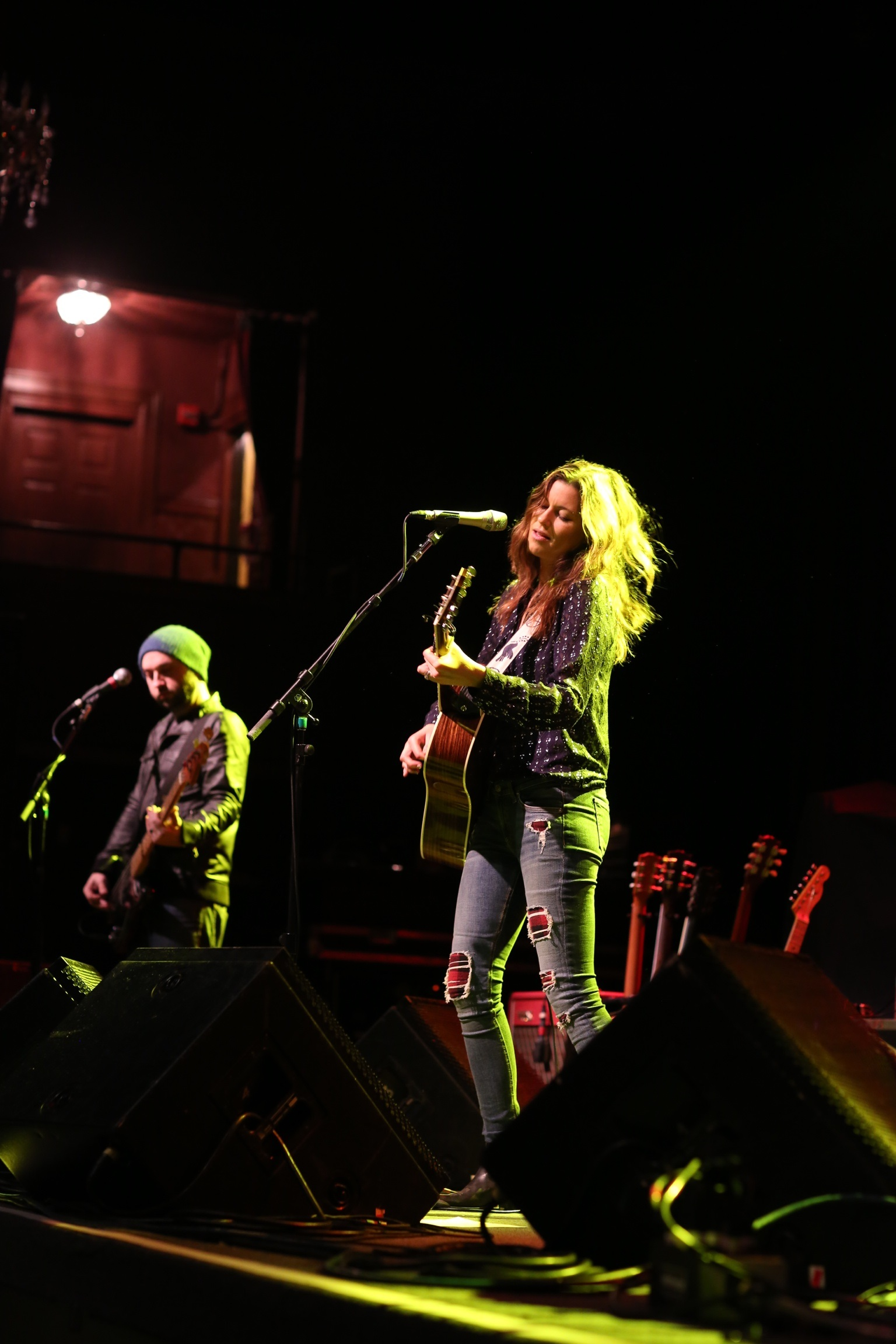

Prettyman was born and raised in Del Mar, California in San Diego County. Prettyman began taking surfing as an elective at her junior high school at the age of 12. She competed in the National Scholastic Surfing Association (NSSA) High School Division and earned fifth place in the state championship while still in middle school. She attended Torrey Pines High School in neighboring Carmel Valley.

Around the age of 15, Prettyman was given a mix tape of Ani DiFranco's music. She received Ani DiFranco‘s “Puddle Dive” album in 1993. Prettyman began playing around with her father's old acoustic guitar. Although her parents were initially angry with her for "taking" the guitar, they eventually became supportive of her interest in music.

Prettyman began playing in front of friends and an employee of the production company The Moonshine Conspiracy overheard Prettyman play and asked her to appear in the company's film Shelter. Prettyman's song "Anything at All" was eventually featured on the film's soundtrack.

== Career ==
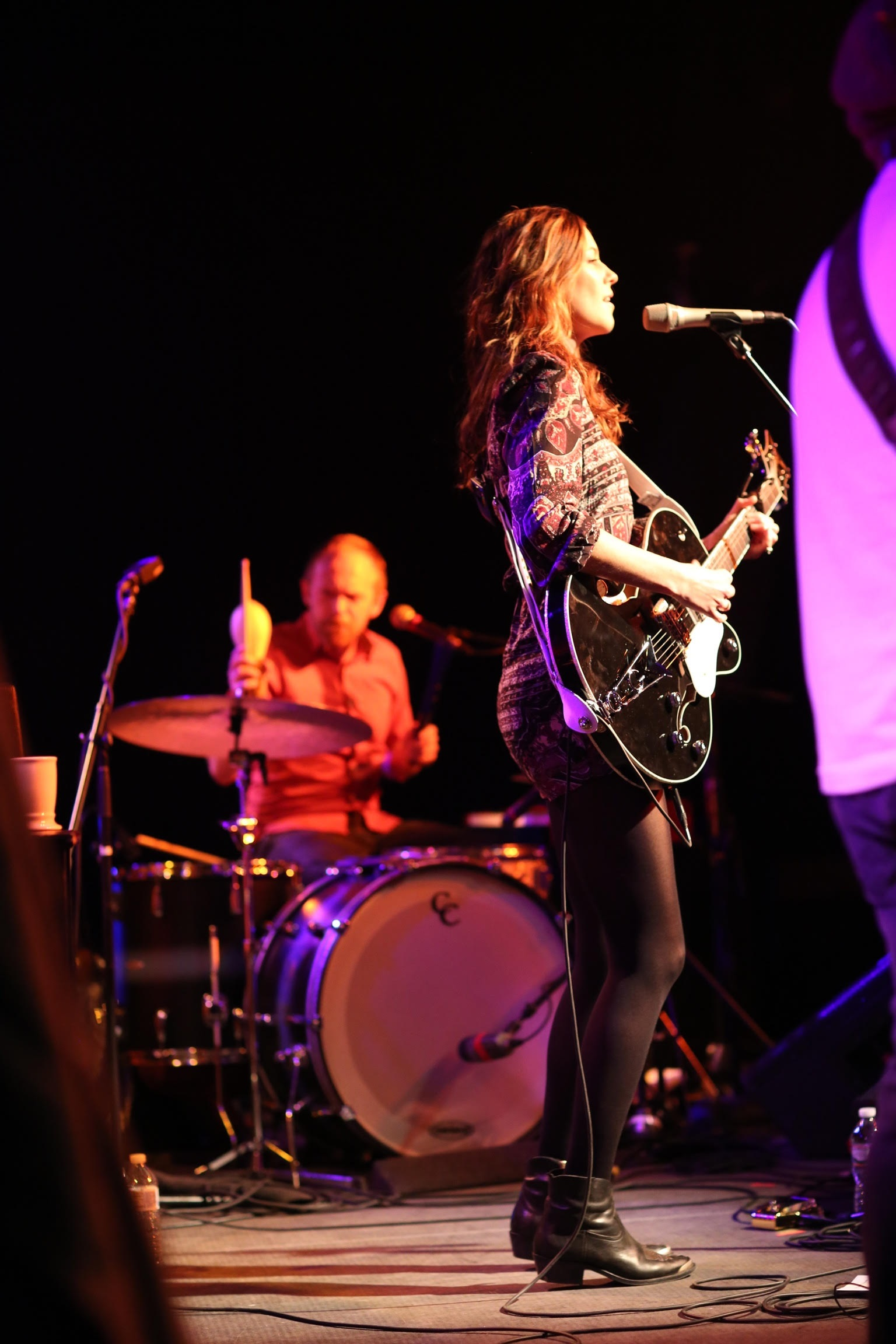

Prettyman began her career playing locally in clubs and bars throughout San Diego County before being invited to join Jason Mraz on his national tour. Prettyman spent winter 2004 in New York collaborating with producer Josh Deutsch.

Twentythree, Prettyman's first album, was released on August 2, 2005, when she was 23 years old. The title pays homage to the 23 Enigma, a concept referring to the abnormally high occurrence of the number 23 in daily life as described in the book Cosmic Trigger by Robert Anton Wilson. The album peaked at number 24 on Billboard's Top Heatseekers chart. Prettyman's second album, Hello...x, was released in 2008 and sold 18, 187 copies in its first week, debuting at 27 on the Billboard 200.

Prettyman plays and endorses Taylor Guitars, as well as Fender & Gretsch. A former Roxy model and avid surfer, Prettyman was interviewed by Men's Fitness in 2008 and questioned about surfing and staying active while on tour.

In June 2012, "My Oh My", the first single from Prettyman's third studio album Cedar + Gold was released. Cedar + Gold was released on October 2, 2012, and peaked at number 47 on the Billboard 200 and 19 on US Top Digital Albums. The music video for the album's second single, "I Was Gonna Marry You", also debuted on October 2. Prettyman toured with The Script in October and November 2012 in support of the album. "Say Anything" from Cedar + Gold is featured in the 2013 film Safe Haven and accompanying soundtrack of Nicholas Sparks's novel.

On October 27, 2014, Prettyman released her EP Back to Home. It is her first independently released album in ten years.

Tristan played a show in March 2022 but she told The San Diego Union-Tribune she enjoys being a full time mother and she has no plans to tour or record until her son is older. She is still writing songs and one of them appeared in a 2021 episode of the TV series Love Island.

== Personal life ==
Prettyman dated musician G. Love and co-wrote a song, "Beautiful", with him. Years later, she was engaged to musician Jason Mraz on December 24, 2010, but they broke off the engagement six months later.

In December 2013, Prettyman announced on Twitter and Facebook that she was engaged to venture capitalist Bill Maris. On August 26, 2014, she announced on social media that she and Maris had married at Kruger National Park in South Africa. On February 17, 2015, she announced on social media that she was expecting their first child. Their son was born on August 26, 2015. In July 2018, Prettyman announced on her blog that she and Maris were ending their marriage.

== Discography ==
=== Albums ===
- 4-Track Demo CD (2002)
- Love (EP) (2003)
- Twentythree (2005)
- Hello...x (April 15, 2008)
- Live Session (an iTunes Exclusive EP) (July 29, 2008)
- Cedar + Gold (October 2, 2012)
- Back to Home (EP) (October 27, 2014)

=== Guest appearances ===
- Brendan Borek Family, Volume 2 (2003)
- G. Love, Lemonade (album) (2006)
- Jason Mraz, "Shy That Way" (2005)
