= Hello...x =

Studio album by Tristan Prettyman
- Released: January 30, 2008
- Genre: Pop
- Length: 43:56
- Label: VRA
- Producer: Sacha Skarbek and Martin Terefe

Tristan Prettyman chronology
Twentythree (2005)	Hello...x (2008)	Cedar + Gold (2012)

Hello...x, is the second album by Californian singer-songwriter Tristan Prettyman. It was released in the UK on January 30, 2008, and in the US on April 15 by Virgin Records America.

== Track listing ==
All songs written by Tristan Prettyman unless otherwise indicated.

1. "Hello"
2. "Echo"
3. "California Girl" (Prettyman, Sacha Skarbek, Martin Terefe)
4. "Madly" (Prettyman, Kevin Griffin)
5. "Blindfold"
6. "Handshake"
7. "War Out of Peace" (Prettyman, Skarbek, Terefe)
8. "You Got Me" (Prettyman, Skarbek, Terefe)
9. "Don't Work Yourself Up" (Prettyman, Skarbek, Terefe)
10. "Just a Little Bit" (Prettyman, Skarbek)
11. "Interviews" (Prettyman, Skarbek, Terefe)
12. "In Bloom"

=== Japanese bonus track ===
13. "God Gave Me Patience"
14. "Hummingbirds"

== Personnel ==
- Tristan Prettyman - acoustic guitar, vocals, cow bell
- Sacha Skarbek - Rhodes, acoustic guitar, Wurlitzer, piano, keys
- Luke Potashnick - guitars
- Karl Brazil - drums, percussion
- Macolm Moore - bass, piano
- Nikolaj Torp - keys, Hammond, glockenspiel
- Kensaltown Kings - claps

== Chart positions ==
Chart (2008)	Position
US Billboard 200	47
US Top Rock Albums (Billboard)	9
Digital Albums	165
Japanese Albums Chart	43
