= Steady B =

American rapper

- 2026 Mugshot of McGlone

Background information
- Born: Warren Sabir McGlone; September 17, 1969 (age 57); Philadelphia, Pennsylvania, U.S.
- Genres: Hip hop; old-school rap; hardcore rap
- Years active: 1985–1996
- Labels: Pop Art, Jive/RCA, Ruffhouse/Columbia/SME
- Criminal information
- Other names: Steady B, Abdus Sabir Salaam
- Status: Incarcerated
- Convictions: Guilty on all counts, October 30, 1996; sentenced to 75 years
- Criminal charges: Second-degree murder, bank robbery, grand larceny
- Penalty: Life without parole

Details
- Victims: Lauretha Vaird
- Date: January 2, 1996
- Country: United States
- State: Pennsylvania
- Date apprehended: January 4, 1996
- Imprisoned at: SCI Phoenix

Warren Sabir McGlone (born September 17, 1969), known by the stage name Steady B, is an American hip hop emcee who, along with Schoolly D, the Fresh Prince, and Three Times Dope, was one of the first wave of Philadelphia-area emcees to gain notoriety in the mid-to-late 1980s. Steady B was a member (and de facto leader) of Philadelphia's Hilltop Hustlers crew. His musical career was relatively short-lived, and he is currently serving a life sentence in a Pennsylvania state prison for his role in the murder of Philadelphia Police officer Lauretha Vaird during a botched bank robbery in 1996.

== Career ==
=== Early career ===
Steady B's original DJ was Grand Dragon K.D., later replaced by DJ Tat Money, who later became the DJ for Kwamé and a New Beginning. He released five albums over the course of his career, with mixed success.

Steady B and Grand Dragon K.D. released a few early hip hop 12" singles on the Pop Art label in 1985. These included "Take Your Radio" (an answer record to LL Cool J's "I Can't Live Without My Radio"), "Fly Shanté" featuring Roxanne Shanté, and "Just Call Us Def". Neither of these early 12" singles feature on albums.

Steady B and Grand Dragon K.D. appeared at "UK Fresh 86" at Wembley Arena in London on July 19, 1986, known as the Hip Hop Woodstock. Recordings of his set featured one track, "Do the Fila".

=== C.E.B. ===
In 1991, Steady B formed the hardcore hip hop group C.E.B. with fellow local Philadelphia emcees Cool C and Ultimate Eaze, in an effort to update his style and record sales. C.E.B.'s name was a backronym for "Countin' Endless Bank", but it was also an acronym for the names of the group's three members. The trio released its only album, Countin' Endless Bank, on Ruffhouse Records in 1992. The single "Get the Point" reached No. 5 on Billboard's Hot Rap Singles. The album was poorly received.

== Armed robbery and murder ==
On January 2, 1996, Steady B, along with C.E.B. bandmate Cool C and another local Philadelphia rapper, Mark Canty, attempted a bank robbery at a PNC bank branch in Feltonville, Philadelphia. During the botched heist, in which Steady B served as the getaway driver in a stolen minivan, Philadelphia Police Officer Lauretha Vaird, who responded to the bank's silent alarm, was shot and killed by Cool C. Vaird, an African American woman and the single mother of two, was the first female Philadelphia police officer killed in the line of duty.

Steady B was arrested at his apartment shortly after the bank robbery. Two handguns left at the scene by Cool C and Canty, including the murder weapon, were traced back to Steady, and he eventually confessed to his role in the crimes to police during interrogation.

At his trial, the State presented evidence, including testimony from Steady's wife, that Steady B, Cool C, and Canty met at Steady B's apartment shortly after the robbery, where they watched coverage of the event on television and discussed their escape. Incriminating statements by Canty were also admitted into evidence at Steady B's trial.

On October 30, 1996, Steady B was convicted of the second-degree murder of Vaird. On December 13, 1996, he was sentenced to life imprisonment without the possibility of parole.

== Discography ==
=== Solo albums ===
Album information
Bring the Beat Back
- Released: July 25, 1986
- Chart positions: No. 44 Top R&B/Hip-Hop Albums
- Singles: "Get Physical", "Stupid Fresh", "Bring the Beat Back"
What's My Name
- Released: August 21, 1987
- Chart positions: No. 49 Top R&B/Hip-Hop Albums, #149 Top 200 Albums
- Singles: "Believe Me Das Bad", "Use Me", "The Hill Top"
Let the Hustlers Play
- Released: September 13, 1988
- Chart positions: No. 56 Top R&B/Hip-Hop Albums, #193 Top 200 Albums
- Singles: "Serious"Gold Single(500,000 units sold)
Going Steady
- Released: October 17, 1989
- Chart positions: No. 51 Top R&B/Hip-Hop Albums
- Singles: "Going Steady"(Gold Single 500,000 units sold) "Nasty Girls", "Mac Daddy"
V
- Released: February 5, 1991
- Singles: "The Girl's Gonna Get Cha"

=== Group album ===
Album information
C.E.B. - Countin' Endless Bank
- Released: January 19, 1993
- Singles: "Get the Point", "Goes Like This", "Gorilla"
