= Superhero Brother =

Studio album by G. Love & Special Sauce
- Released: June 24, 2008
- Recorded: 2008
- Length: 45:20
- Label: Brushfire
- Producer: Chris DiBeneditto; Pete Donnelly

G. Love & Special Sauce chronology
Electric Mile (2001)	Superhero Brother (2008)	Long Way Down (2009)

Professional ratings
Aggregate scores
Source	Rating
Metacritic	65/100
Review scores
Source	Rating
AllMusic	3/5 stars
Los Angeles Times	2.5/4 stars
musicOMH	3/5 stars
Now	2/5 Ns
PopMatters	5/10

Superhero Brother is the eighth studio album by American rock band G. Love & Special Sauce. It was released on June 24, 2008 via Brushfire Records. Recorded at Philadelphonic Studios and Long View Farms Studios, it was produced by Chris DiBeneditto and Pete Donnelly. In the United States, the album peaked at number 63 on the Billboard 200 and number 24 on the Top Rock Albums charts.

== Track listing ==
No.	Title	Writer(s)	Producer(s)	Length
1.	"Communication"	Garrett Dutton	Chris DiBeneditto	3:21
2.	"City Livin'"	Dutton; Jeffrey Clemens; James Prescott; Mark Boyce	Chris DiBeneditto	4:05
3.	"Wiggle Worm"	Dutton; Clemens; Prescott; Boyce	Chris DiBeneditto	4:05
4.	"Peace, Love and Happiness"	Dutton; Jasper Thomas	Chris DiBeneditto; Pete Donnelly	3:42
5.	"Soft and Sweet"	Dutton	Chris DiBeneditto	3:21
6.	"Wontcha Come Home"	Dutton; Edward O'Sullivan Lee; Delroy Wilson	Chris DiBeneditto	2:32
7.	"Crumble"	Dutton	Chris DiBeneditto	4:47
8.	"What We Need"	Dutton	Chris DiBeneditto	3:20
9.	"Grandmother"	Dutton	Chris DiBeneditto	2:42
10.	"Georgia Brown"	Dutton	Chris DiBeneditto	3:16
11.	"Who's Got the Weed"	Dutton; Tre Hardson; Peter Simmons	Chris DiBeneditto	5:45
12.	"Superhero Brother"	Dutton	Chris DiBeneditto	4:24
Total length:				45:20

== Personnel ==
- Garrett "G. Love" Dutton – vocals, guitar, harmonica, handclaps, whistle, beatboxing
- Jeffrey Clemens – backing vocals, drums, percussion, handclaps
- Jimi "Jazz" Prescott – string bass, electric bass, handclaps
- Mark Boyce – backing vocals, piano, organ, analogue synthesizer, clavinet, handclaps
- Chris DiBeneditto – backing vocals, percussion, handclaps, producer, recording, mixing
- Pete Donelly – backing vocals, percussion, handclaps, producer, recording
- Fred Berman – percussion & handclaps
- Daniel Delacruz – saxophone
- Sheffer Bruton – trombone
- Christofer "C-Money" Welter – trumpet
- Tre "Slimkid3" Hardson – vocals
- Aaron Dembe – recording
- Chris Athens – mastering
- Jay Franco – mastering assistant
- Kurt Bradley – mastering assistant
- Autumn de Wilde – photography
- Scott Soens – photography

== Charts ==
Chart (2008)	Peak position
US Billboard 200	63
US Top Rock Albums (Billboard)	24
