= Electric Mile =

Studio album by G. Love & Special Sauce
- Released: April 24, 2001
- Studio: Long View Farm Studios (North Brookfield, MA)
- Length: 51:09
- Label: Okeh; Epic
- Producer: Chris DiBeneditto; G. Love & Special Sauce

G. Love & Special Sauce chronology
Philadelphonic (1999)	Electric Mile (2001)	The Hustle (2004)

Professional ratings
Aggregate scores
Source	Rating
Metacritic	70/100
Review scores
Source	Rating
AllMusic	3/5 stars
The Michigan Daily	B+

Electric Mile is the fifth studio album by American rock band G. Love & Special Sauce. It was released on April 24, 2001, via Epic Records. Recorded at Long View Farm Studios in North Brookfield, it was produced by the band themselves with Chris DiBeneditto and co-producer Michael Barbiero. The album debuted at number 138 on the Billboard 200 in the United States.

== Track listing ==
No.	Title	Writer(s)	Length
1.	"Unified"	Garrett Dutton; Richard Arthur Smith	3:07
2.	"Praise Up"	Dutton	3:43
3.	"Night of the Living Dead"	Jeffrey Clemens	4:36
4.	"Parasite"	Dutton; Jasper Thomas; Jim Prescott	6:17
5.	"Hopeless Case"	Dutton	3:43
6.	"Free at Last"	Dutton; Prescott	2:22
7.	"Shy Girl"	Dutton	3:32
8.	"Rain Jam"	Dutton	1:04
9.	"Electric Mile"	Dutton	3:40
10.	"Sara's Song"	Dutton	4:59
11.	"100 Magic Rings"	Dutton	3:52
12.	"Poison"	Dutton	4:19
13.	"Free at Last (Reprise)"	Dutton; Prescott	5:55
Total length:			51:09

== Personnel ==
- Garrett "G. Love" Dutton – vocals (tracks: 1–7, 9–13), guitar, harmonica (tracks: 1, 10–12), producer
- Jeffrey Clemens – vocals (tracks: 1–7, 9–13), drums, producer
- Jim Prescott – string bass, producer
- Alma – vocals (tracks: 2–4), backing vocals (track 7)
- Jasper Thomas – vocals (track 4)
- Nancy Falkow – backing vocals (track 7)
- Dave Geller – congas (tracks: 2, 3, 9)
- Jamie Janover – percussion (tracks: 2, 3), hammered dulcimer (track 9)
- Arty – viola (tracks: 3, 5)
- Hoch – cello (tracks: 3, 5)
- John Medeski – organ (tracks: 4, 6, 13), Wurlitzer (tracks: 4, 13), clavenette (track 4), Moog (track 9), Rhodes (track 13)
- Billy Conway – percussion (tracks: 8, 13)
- Little Frankie – lap steel (track 10)
- Chris DiBeneditto – producer, mixing (track 12)
- Michael Barbiero – co-producer, mixing (tracks: 1–11, 13)
- Walt Bass – mixing assistant
- Paul Conway – engineering assistant
- Greg Calbi – mastering
- Sean Murphy – photography
- Thomas Smith – photography

== Charts ==
Chart (2001)	Peak position
US Billboard 200	138
