= Murder of Lauretha Vaird =

1996 murder of a female police officer in Philadelphia, Pennsylvania

Lauretha Vaird
- Born: Lauretha A. Vaird; August 4, 1952; Philadelphia, Pennsylvania, U.S.
- Died: January 2, 1996 (aged 43); Feltonville, Philadelphia, Pennsylvania, U.S.
- Resting place: Ivy Hill Cemetery, Philadelphia, Pennsylvania, U.S.
- Relatives: 2 children
- Police career
- Country: United States
- Allegiance: Pennsylvania
- Department: Philadelphia Police Department
- Service years: 1986 – January 1996
- Status: Deceased
- Badge no.: 5897

Lauretha A. Vaird (August 4, 1952 – January 2, 1996) was a Philadelphia Police Department officer who was shot dead by the rapper Christopher "Cool C" Roney during a botched armed bank robbery in January 1996. Roney attempted to rob the bank with another rapper, Warren "Steady B" McGlone, and another man, Mark Canty. During the robbery, Vaird was mortally wounded by a gunshot wound in the abdomen and died soon after. Vaird was Philadelphia's first female police officer to be shot and killed in the line of duty.

== Background ==
Vaird was a single mother of two boys. Before she became a police officer, she worked as a teacher's aide at Pickett Middle School in Germantown. She joined the Philadelphia police force in 1986 at the age of 34.

== Murder ==
On January 2, 1996, at around 8:20 a.m., "Cool C" and "Steady B", and their accomplice, Canty, attempted to rob a PNC Bank branch in Feltonville, Philadelphia, at 4710 Rising Sun Avenue. The men had stolen a green minivan for the job which was driven by McGlone who acted as the getaway driver. Roney and Canty went into the branch before it was due to open. Canty carried a 9 millimeter semi-automatic handgun and Roney was armed with a .38 caliber revolver. The bank had no security guards, which influenced the men to rob that particular branch. They held three bank employees at gunpoint and demanded access to the bank vault. Within moments of entering the bank, the silent alarm was tripped. Vaird, who was in the area and riding alone in a patrol car, responded to the alarm.

Canty forced two of the bank employees to take him to the vault while Roney stood guard by the bank entrance covering the third employee. As Vaird entered the door to the bank with her weapon drawn, she was shot in the abdomen by Roney. Vaird was wearing a bulletproof vest, but it was without its bullet-resistant panels. After he shot her, Roney left the bank through the front door. Canty fled through a side entrance and left his gun at the scene. Roney then exchanged fire with another police officer, Donald Patterson, who arrived shortly after Vaird. Roney was able to escape and dropped his gun on the sidewalk outside the entrance to the bank. He got into the minivan with McGlone and the two men then fled. None of the three suspects stole anything from the bank. Vaird was taken to St. Christopher's Hospital for Children, where she was pronounced dead at 9:56 am, having been killed by the single shot to the abdomen.

== Aftermath ==
The two pistols used by the assailants were found separately outside different entrances to the bank. The stolen minivan that Roney and McGlone had escaped in was found abandoned about a mile from the bank. The police also found various items of clothing used as disguises by Canty and Roney. This evidence led to their warrants and arrests. The guns were traced back to both Canty and McGlone. The .38 caliber revolver used by Roney belonged to Anthony Brown, a relative of Canty. It had been stolen from Brown and was last seen in Canty's possession before the bank robbery. The 9mm semi-automatic pistol was traced back to Richelle Parker, a friend of McGlone, who had bought the gun for him.

McGlone was arrested outside his home two days later on January 4, 1996. He was charged with murder in the death of officer Vaird. After questioning McGlone, police issued a warrant for the arrests of Canty and Roney. Canty was arrested during a traffic stop in Maryland at a later date. Roney surrendered to the police on January 6, 1996.

Vaird died at the age of 43 and is buried at Ivy Hill Cemetery in Philadelphia, Pennsylvania.

== Trial and conviction ==
On October 30, 1996, McGlone and Canty were both sentenced to life in prison without possibility of parole. McGlone is an inmate at the State Correctional Institution – Houtzdale and his inmate ID number is DD6864. Canty is an inmate at the State Correctional Institution – Mahanoy and his inmate ID number is DD6842. Roney was identified as the actual killer of Vaird, as he had been the one to fire the gun that killed her. On October 30, 1996, Roney was found guilty of first-degree murder, three counts of robbery, conspiracy, aggravated assault, burglary and possession of an instrument of crime. On November 1, 1996, he received the death penalty for murdering Vaird. He is currently on death row awaiting execution and is an inmate at the State Correctional Institution – Greene. His inmate ID number is DF1973.

On January 10, 2006, Roney's death warrant was signed by Pennsylvania Governor Ed Rendell and his execution date was set for March 9, 2006 (Rendell was Philadelphia's Mayor at the time of the robbery/murder). He was granted a stay of execution on February 1, 2006, until all post-conviction litigation was resolved. His execution was set for January 8, 2015, but he was granted another stay of execution by Pennsylvania Judge Luis Felipe Restrepo on December 5, 2014.
