= G. Love and Special Sauce (album) =

Studio album by G. Love & Special Sauce
- Released: 1994
- Genre: Rap, blues
- Length: 58:29
- Label: Epic
- Producer: Stiff Johnson, Special Sauce

G. Love & Special Sauce chronology
G. Love and Special Sauce (1994)	Coast to Coast Motel (1995)

Singles from G. Love and Special Sauce
- 1. "Cold Beverage" Released: 1994; 2. "Baby's Got Sauce" Released: 1994

G. Love and Special Sauce is the debut album by the American band G. Love & Special Sauce, released in 1994. The album was certified Gold after selling 500,000 copies. It contains the song "Cold Beverage", which became a college-radio staple, as well as "Baby's Got Sauce", which Seattle's KEXP-FM 90.3 called the song of the year.

== Critical reception ==
Professional ratings
Review scores
Source	Rating
AllMusic	3/5 stars
Q	3/5 stars

The Philadelphia Inquirer wrote that G. Love's "carefree playing refracts the blues into a slew of unlikely colors, and his rapping, a style he calls 'ragmop', is one of the most significant updates of blues phrasing since British rockers took a shine to the sound in the mid-'60s." The Globe and Mail concluded that "it's nothing profound and it will no doubt get up the nose of both blues and rap purists, but it's good dumb fun nonetheless."

The album was included in the book 1001 Albums You Must Hear Before You Die.

== Track listing ==
1. "The Things That I Used to Do" – 3:35
2. "Blues Music" – 4:17
3. "Garbage Man" – 4:51
4. "Eyes Have Miles" – 5:22
5. "Baby's Got Sauce" – 3:54
6. "Rhyme for the Summertime" – 3:06
7. "Cold Beverage" – 2:33
8. "Fatman" – 4:16
9. "This Ain't Living" – 6:34
10. "Walk to Slide" – 4:28
11. "Shooting Hoops (with Mou Akoon)" – 3:31
12. "Some Peoples Like That" – 4:49
13. "Town to Town" – 3:33
14. "I Love You" – 3:32

== Personnel ==
G. Love & Special Sauce

- G. Love – lead vocals, guitar, harmonica
- Jeffrey Clemens – drums, percussion, background vocals
- Jimi "Jazz" Prescott – string bass

Additional musicians

- Scott Storch – piano
- Jasper – additional lead vocals
