= Chuck Treece =

American musician and pro skateboarder (born 1964)

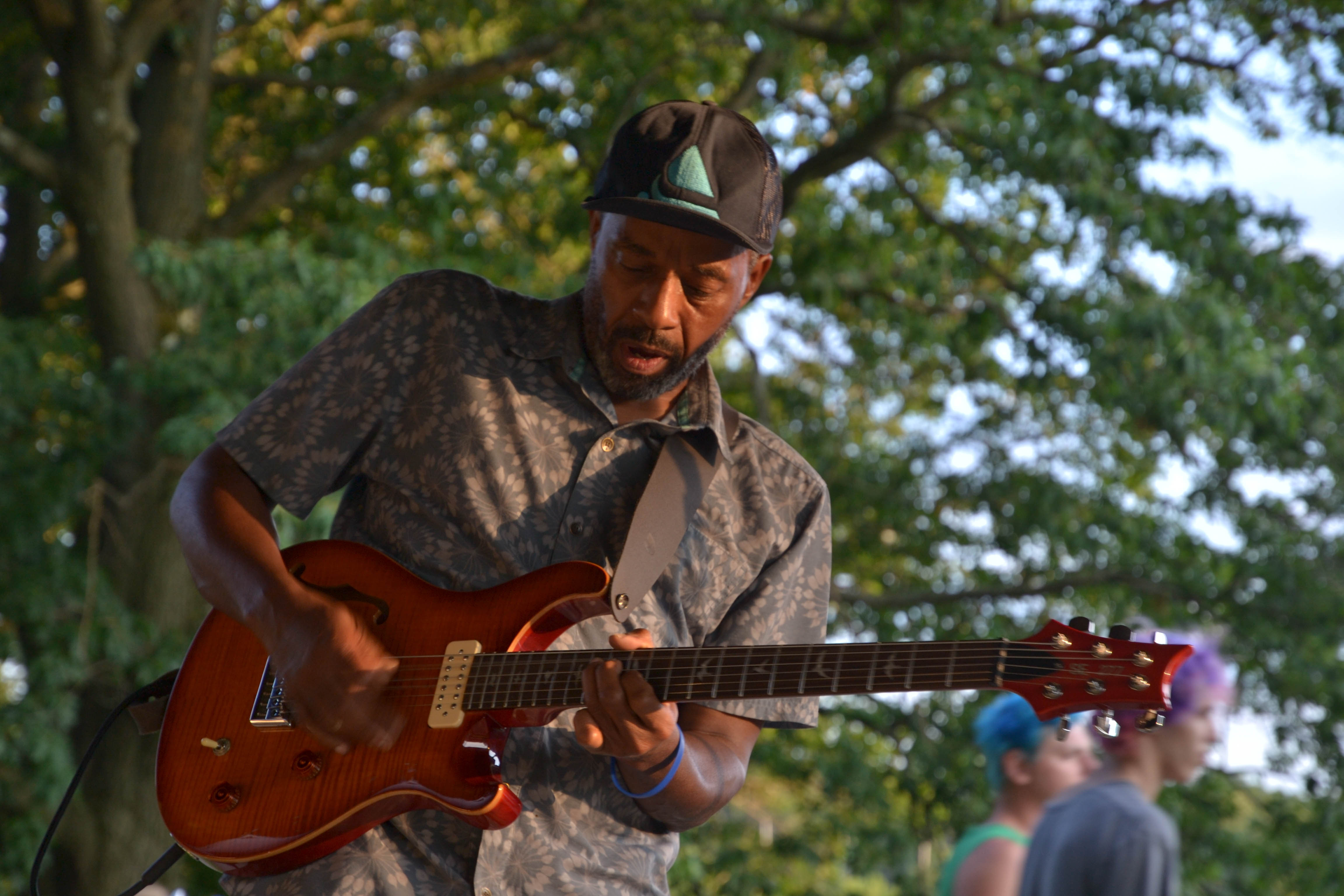
- Treece performing in Carnegie, Pennsylvania in 2021

Background information
- Born: May 30, 1964 (age 62); Newark, Delaware, U.S.
- Origin: Philadelphia, Pennsylvania, U.S.
- Genres: Punk rock; skate punk; hardcore punk
- Instruments: Drums; guitar; bass
- Years active: 1982–present

Chuck Treece (born May 30, 1964) is an American musician and professional skateboarder from Philadelphia, Pennsylvania. In 1984, he became famous for being the first African-American skateboarder to be featured on the cover of Thrasher magazine. His musical credits include starting the skate punk band McRad in 1982, remixing songs for Amy Grant and Sting, playing the bass line on "The River of Dreams" by Billy Joel, and The Lemonheads, with filling in on drums at a Pearl Jam concert, and touring with Urge Overkill, Underdog and Bad Brains. In 2010, he was awarded a Pew Fellowships in the Arts. Chuck currently plays bass in a thrash metal band called ACTiVATE. Treece drummed on the album, Mass by Canadian ska band, Bedouin Soundclash.

After recording on The Movement’s album Set Sail Gary Jackson (drums) and Jason Schmidt (bass) joined The Movement as full-time members of the band.

== Life ==
Treece grew up in Newark, Delaware, where he attended John Dickinson High School, but moved to Philadelphia in 1982 because, according to Treece, "I was sick of high-school and I knew I wasn't going to college. I knew I wanted to do music and skate." Between 1982 and 1990, he was a professional skater with endorsements by several companies, including Santa Cruz Skateboards, Powell-Peralta, and Airwalk sneakers. Treece released two albums with his band McRad, Absence of Sanity in the 1980s (rereleased 2001) and FDR in 2007. Treece considered his band a skate rock band, stating that in addition to himself, band members Tristan, Ethan and Zeke were also active skaters. Treece also played guitar with New York hardcore band Underdog and recorded on their 1989 LP "Vanishing Point". In 1991, he also released a solo album on Caroline Records titled Dream'n.

Starting in 2001, Treece was also a founding member of Philadelphia punk band Stiffed. The band helped launch the chart-topping solo career of Stiffed's vocalist Santi White under the stage name of Santigold, who credits Treece as "the person that got me to sing."

Most recently, Treece joined producer Chris DiBeneditto at Philadelphonic Studios to record the drum tracks for The Movement's 2008 rock/reggae album Set Sail. After recording the album, fellow McRad band members Gary Jackson and Jason Schmidt took on the role as drummer and bassist for The Movement. Treece continues to skate at FDR Skatepark in Philadelphia and works closely with legendary producer Joe "The Butcher" Nicolo. In 2010 Treece joined Philly/NYC punk band Plastic Eaters as their resident drummer. In 2014 Treece continued his Long time musical connection with legendary singer [HR] of the Bad Brains writing and recording new tracks in the studio and performing live shows on Drums with HR and Philly Dub/ Reggae outfit I Yahn I Arkestra notably featuring Treece's childhood Musical mentor, the original Dub Warrior Timi Tanzania. In January 2016 Treece played second guitar in the DC hardcore group Scream at the Black Cat in Washington DC for a benefit show for area musician Doc Night.

In 2022, Treece joined Michael Hampton to form the funk/punk fusion group Punkadelic. With Hampton on guitar and Treece on bass and drums, Punkadelic performed both original music and Funkadelic covers in Philadelphia, Mexico, and live on the radio at WOCM Ocean 98 in Ocean City, Maryland. Punkadelic released 2 singles and an original EP titled Collective Consciousness in 2023.
