= Long Way Down (G. Love & Special Sauce album) =

Studio album by G. Love and Special Sauce
- Released: 2009
- Label: Philadelphonic Records

G. Love and Special Sauce chronology
Superhero Brother (2008)	Long Way Down (2009)

Long Way Down (2009) is a studio album released by American hip hop/rock band G. Love and Special Sauce. The album, released in Australia and New Zealand only, is the first release on the band's own label, Philadelphonic Records.

== Track listing ==
1. "Peace Love Happiness"
2. "Soft & Sweet"
3. "Wontcha"
4. "Crumble"
5. "Who's Got the Weed"
6. "Jenny Crash"
7. "Lottery"
8. "Grandmother"
9. "Dream"
10. "Long Way Down"
11. "Honey"
12. "Superhero Brother"
