= Talk of the Town =

Talk of the Town may refer to:

== Film and television ==
- The Talk of the Town (1918 film), an American film starring Lon Chaney, Sr.
- The Talk of the Town (1941 film), a Swedish film
- The Talk of the Town (1942 film), an American comedy/drama film
- Talk of the Town (1995 film), a German film
- Talk of the Town, a 1996 short film by Lani Tupu
- Talk of the Town (talk show), a 1982 American comedy/talk cable television show

== Literature ==
- The Talk of the Town (novel), a 1999 novel by Ardal O'Hanlon
- Talk of the Town (2010 novel), a 2010 novel by Jacob Polley
- Talk of the Town (magazine), a 2003–2004 arts supplement of the Independent on Sunday
- "The Talk of the Town", a section in the magazine The New Yorker

== Music ==
- "Talk of the Town" (Pretenders song), 1980
- "Talk of the Town" (Jack Johnson song), 2006
- "Talk of the Town" (Fred Again, Sammy Virji and Reggie song), 2025
- "Talk of the Town", a song by Jack Harlow on Come Home the Kids Miss You, 2022
- "Talk of the Town", a song by Elle King on Shake the Spirit, 2018
- "Talk of the Town", a song by Fredo, 2021
- The Talk of the Town (album), a 1987 album by Houston Person
- Talk of the Town, a 2024 bluegrass album by Darin & Brooke Aldridge
- Talk of the Town (active 2004–2011), an American a cappella group featuring Jerry Lawson
- Talk of the Town, a c. 2007 album by TBC
- The Talk of the Town, a 1905 musical by Seymour Hicks
- The Talk of the Town, a 1993 album by Bennie Wallace

== Other uses ==
- Talk of the Town (nightclub), a 1958–1982 nightclub in the Hippodrome in London
- The Talk of the Town (horse) (1947–1976), a Tennessee Walking Horse

== See also ==
- "It's the Talk of the Town", a 1933 song written by Jerry Livingston, Al J. Neiburg and Marty Symes
- Live at the Talk of the Town (disambiguation)
