= Scarp =

Scarp may refer to:

== Landforms and geology ==
- Cliff, a significant vertical, or near vertical, rock exposure
- Escarpment, a steep slope or long cliff that occurs from erosion or faulting and separates two relatively level areas of differing elevations
- Fault scarp, the topographic expression of faulting attributed to the displacement of the land surface by movement along faults

== Other ==
- Scarp, Scotland, an island in the Outer Hebrides of Scotland
- Scarp Forest, a location in South Africa
- Scarp and counterscarp, the inner and outer sides of a ditch or moat used in fortifications
- SS-9 Scarp, the NATO reporting name for the R-36 ICBM
- Scarp, a 2013 book by the British writer Nick Papadimitriou

== See also ==
- Scarpe (disambiguation)
