= Iain Sinclair =

British writer (born 1943)

Iain Sinclair FRSL
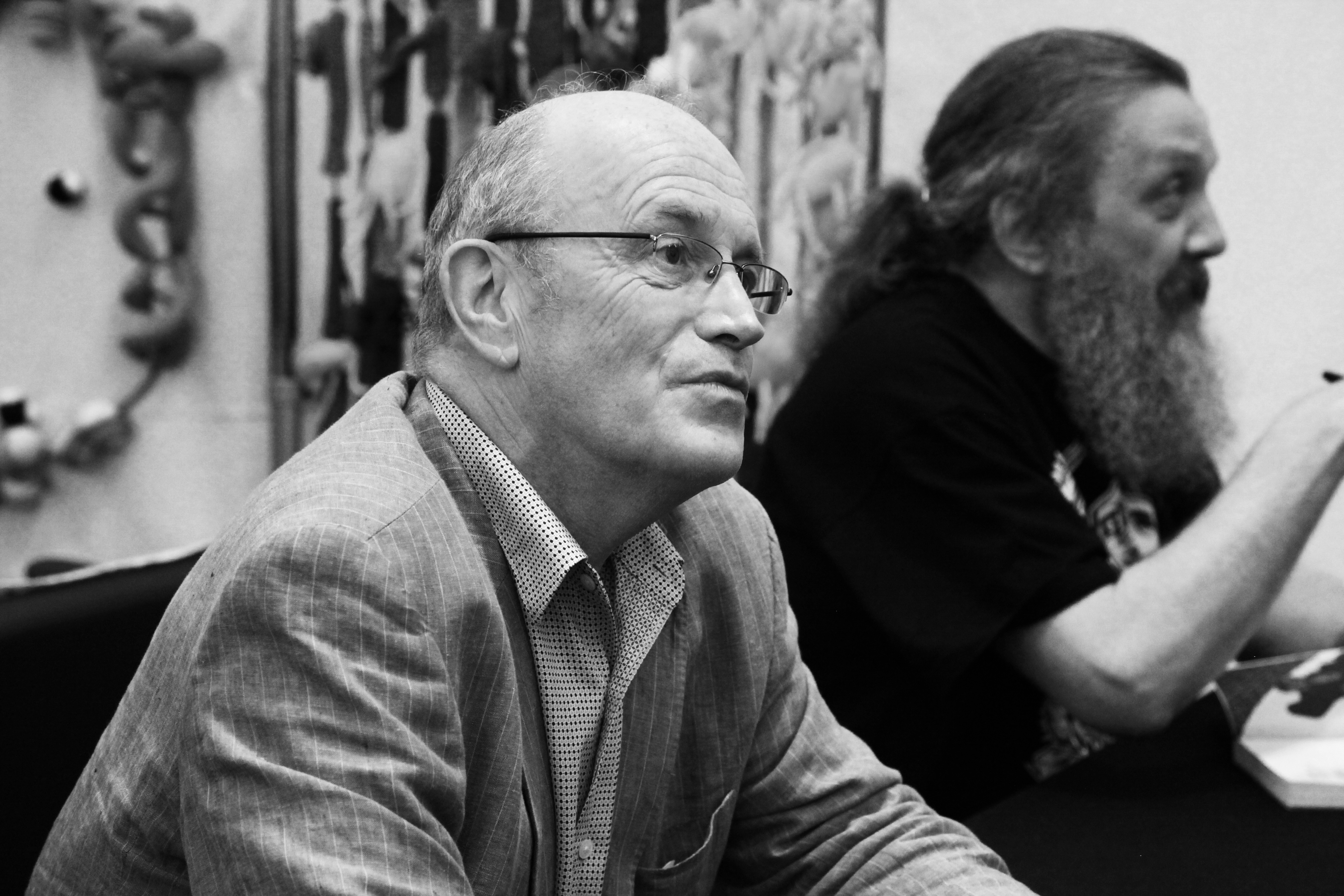
- Sinclair (left) and Alan Moore at the Cheltenham Science Festival in 2011
- Born: 11 June 1943 (age 83); Cardiff, Wales
- Education: Cheltenham College; Trinity College, Dublin
- Writing career
- Period: 1967–present
- Notable work: Downriver
- Website: www.iainsinclair.org.uk

Iain Sinclair FRSL (born 11 June 1943) is a writer and filmmaker. Much of his work is rooted in London, and influenced by psychogeography.

== Early life and education ==
Sinclair was born in Cardiff, Wales, on 11 June 1943.

From 1956 to 1961, he was educated at Cheltenham College, a boarding school for boys, followed by Trinity College, Dublin (where he edited Icarus). He attended the Courtauld Institute of Art and the London School of Film Technique (now the London Film School).

== Career ==
=== Development as author ===
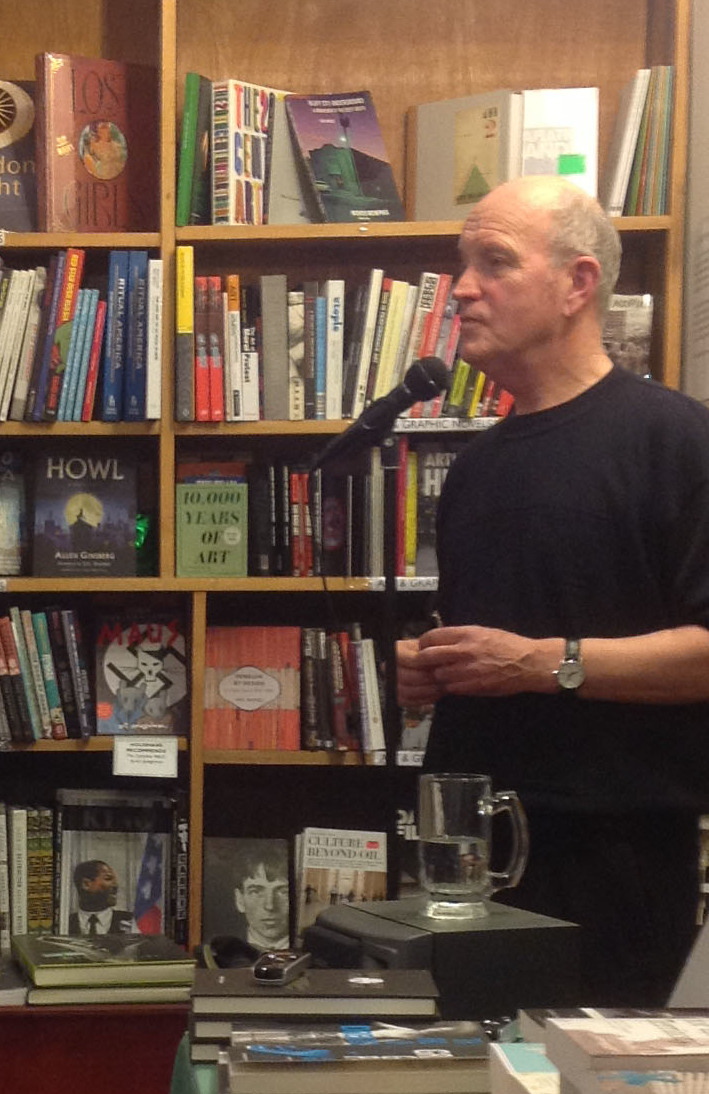
Sinclair at a bookshop reading in Housmans in 2013

Sinclair's early work was mostly poetry, much of it published by his own small press, Albion Village Press. He was (and remains) connected with the British avant garde poetry scene of the 1960s and 1970s – authors such as Edward Dorn, J. H. Prynne, Douglas Oliver, Peter Ackroyd and Brian Catling are often quoted in his work and even turn up in fictionalised form as characters. Later, taking over from John Muckle, Sinclair edited the Paladin Poetry Series and, in 1996, the Picador anthology Conductors of Chaos.

His early books Lud Heat (1975) and Suicide Bridge (1979) were a mixture of essay, fiction, prose-poetry and poetry; they were followed by White Chappell, Scarlet Tracings (1987), a novel juxtaposing the tale of a disreputable band of bookdealers on the hunt for a priceless copy of Arthur Conan Doyle's A Study in Scarlet and the Jack the Ripper murders (here attributed to the physician William Gull) and highly praised by Michael Moorcock.

Sinclair was for some time perhaps best known for the novel Downriver (1991), which won the James Tait Black Memorial Prize and the 1992 Encore Award. It envisages the UK under the rule of 'the Widow', a grotesque version of Margaret Thatcher as viewed by her harshest critics, who supposedly establishes a one-party state in a fifth term. Radon Daughters, a novel influenced by the work of William Hope Hodgson, formed the third part of a trilogy with White Chappell, Scarlet Tracings and Downriver.

The volume of essays Lights Out for the Territory gained Sinclair a wider readership by treating the material of his novels in non-fiction form. His essay Sorry Meniscus (1999) ridiculed the Millennium Dome. In 1997, he collaborated with Chris Petit, sculptor Steve Dilworth, and others to make The Falconer, a 56-minute semi-fictional "documentary" film set in London and the Outer Hebrides, about the British underground filmmaker Peter Whitehead. It also features Stewart Home, Kathy Acker and Howard Marks.

=== Psychogeography ===
A significant proportion of Sinclair's work has consisted of an ambitious and elaborate literary recuperation of the so-called occultist psychogeography of London. Other writers who have mined a similar seam include Will Self, Stewart Home, Michael Moorcock, and Aidan Andrew Dun.

One of a series of works focused around London is the non-fiction London Orbital, the hardcover edition of which was published in 2002, along with a documentary film of the same name and subject. It describes a series of trips he took tracing the M25, London's outer-ring motorway, on foot. Sinclair followed this with Edge of the Orison in 2005, a psychogeographical reconstruction of the poet John Clare's walk from Dr Matthew Allen's private lunatic asylum, at Fairmead House, High Beach, in Epping Forest in Essex, to his home in Helpston, near Peterborough. Sinclair also writes about Claybury Asylum, another psychiatric hospital in Essex, in Rodinsky's Room, a collaboration with the artist Rachel Lichtenstein.

Sinclair's book Ghost Milk criticised the British government for using the 2012 Summer Olympics as an excuse to militarise London while forcing the poorest citizens out of their homes. The 2012 games mark a shift in Sinclair's psychogeographical writing, moving to a more documentary mode with fewer semi-fictional elements included in his work. In 2017 Sinclair published The Last London, a conscious move away from writing about "A city so much estranged from its earlier identities (always shifting and revising) that it is unrecognisable." This marked the culmination of a series of works that detailed Sinclair's attempts to grasp the changing nature of London and to re-map his own experiences of the city.

Sinclair's own view of psychogeography later echoed many of the earlier criticisms of his work which focused on the commodification of 'heritage zones' in less affluent areas of the city. In a 2016 interview, he stated: "I don’t think there is any more than can be said. The topic has outlived its usefulness and become a brand."

=== The Reforgotten ===
A consistent theme in Sinclair's non-fiction and semi-fictional works has been the rediscovery of writers who enjoyed success in the early 20th century, but have been largely forgotten. These writers predominantly focus on London, particularly the East London districts in which Sinclair has lived and worked. He has written about, championed and contributed introductory notes to novels by authors such as Robert Westerby, Roland Camberton, Alexander Baron and John Healy. His 2016 work My Favourite London Devils focused on his rediscovery and appreciation of these writers, often while working as a used book dealer.

=== Peru ===
In June 2019, Sinclair travelled to Lima to begin retracing the journey of his great-grandfather, Arthur Sinclair, to "the source of the Amazon" as described in the 1895 book In Tropical Lands. Travelling with his daughter, Farne, filmmaker Grant Gee, and poet and translator Adolfo Barberá del Rosal, the journey was expected to result in a range of artistic responses including podcasts, film and various books. The journey was partly funded by the British Film Institute's documentary fund and part by crowdfunding. The expedition provided material for an essay-feature film entitled The Gold Machine, released in 2022. A book by Sinclair with the same title was also published in 2021. A small selection of prose-poetry inspired by the trip was published by Earthbound Press.

== Recognition and awards ==
In an interview with This Week in Science in 2004, William Gibson said that Sinclair was his favourite author.

Sinclair was elected a Fellow of the Royal Society of Literature in 2009.

In 2013, he became a visiting professor at the University for the Creative Arts.

In October 2018, the University of Surrey reported that Sinclair had been appointed "distinguished writer in residence" with their School of Literature and Languages.

== Personal life ==
As of 2010, Sinclair lived in Haggerston, in the London Borough of Hackney, and had a flat in Marine Court, a building designed in the Streamline Moderne style in St Leonards-on-Sea, East Sussex.

== Bibliography ==
- Back Garden Poems, Albion Village Press, 1970
- The Kodak Mantra Diaries, Albion Village Press, 1971
- Muscat's Würm, Albion Village Press, 1972
- The Birth Rug, Albion Village Press, 1973
- Lud Heat, Albion Village Press, 1975
- Suicide Bridge, Albion Village Press, 1979
- Flesh Eggs and Scalp Metal, Hoarse Commerce, 1983
- Autistic poses, Hors Commerce, 1985
- White Chappell, Scarlet Tracings, Goldmark, 1987
- Significant wreckage, Words Press, 1988
- Flesh Eggs and Scalp Metal: Selected Poems 1970–1987, Paladin, 1989
- Downriver, Paladin Grafton, 1991
- The Shamanism of Intent: Some Flights of Redemption, Goldmark, 1991
- Jack Elam's Other Eye, Hoarse Commerz, 1991
- Radon Daughters, Jonathan Cape, 1994
- Conductors of Chaos: a Poetry Anthology, (Ed.), Picador, 1996
- Penguin Modern Poets Volume Ten: Douglas Oliver, Denise Riley, Iain Sinclair, Penguin, 1996
- Lights out for the territory: 9 Excursions in the secret history of London. Granta Books. 1997. ISBN 1-86207-009-1., non-fiction
- The Ebbing of the Kraft, Equipage, 1997
- Slow Chocolate Autopsy, Phoenix House, 1997
- Liquid City, Reaktion, 1999 (with Marc Atkins)
- Rodinsky's Room, Granta, 1999 (with Rachel Lichtenstein)
- Crash, British Film Institute, 1999
- Sorry Meniscus (Excursions to the Millennium Dome), Profile Books, 1999
- Landor's Tower, Granta, 2001
- London Orbital, Granta, 2002
- Saddling The Rabbit, Etruscan Books, 2002
- White Goods, Goldmark, 2002
- The Verbals - in conversation with Kevin Jackson, Worple Press, 2003
- Dining on Stones, novel, 2004
- Edge of the Orison: In the Traces of John Clare's 'Journey Out of Essex', non-fiction, 2005
- The Firewall (selected poems 1979 – 2006), Etruscan Books, 2006
- Buried at Sea, Worple Press, 2006
- London: City of Disappearances, editor, various essays about London psychogeography etc., 2006
- Hackney, That Rose-Red Empire: A Confidential Report, non-fiction, 2009
- "Sickening", in Restless Cities, edited by M. Beaumont and G. Dart, London: Verso, 2010. 257–276.
- Ghost Milk, non-fiction (memoir), 2011
- Blake's London: The Topographical Sublime, The Swedenborg Society, 2012
- Kitkitdizze... Seeing Gary Snyder, Beat Scene, January 2013
- Swimming To Heaven: The Lost Rivers of London, The Swedenborg Society, 2013
- Austerlitz and After: Tracking Sebald, chapter deleted from American Smoke, Test Centre, 2013
- Red Eye, Test Centre, 2013
- Objects of Obscure Desire, Goldmark, 2013 (illustrated by Sarah Simblet)
- American Smoke: Journeys to the End of the Light, 2014
- Cowboy / Deleted File, chapter deleted from American Smoke, Test Centre, 2014
- London Overground: A Day's Walk around the Ginger Line, 2015
- Black Apples of Gower, Little Toller Books, 2015
- Westering, Test Centre, 2015
- Liquid City, Expanded edition, non-fiction, Reaktion Books, 2016 (with Marc Atkins)
- Seeschlange, Equipage, 2016
- My Favourite London Devils: A Gazetteer of Encounters with Local Scribes, Elective Shamen & Unsponsored Keepers of the Sacred Flame, Tangerine Press, 2016
- The Last London: True Fictions from an Unreal City, Oneworld Publications, 2017
- Living with Buildings: Walking with Ghosts – On Health and Architecture, Wellcome, 2018
- Dark Before Dark, Tangerine Press, 2019 (photography by Anonymous Bosch)
- Fever Hammer Yellow – Earthbound Poetry Series Vol.1 No.7, Earthbound Press, 2020
- Our Late Familiars – Goldmark, 2020 (photography by Ian Wilkinson)
- The Gold Machine - In the Tracks of the Mule Dancers - Oneworld Publications, 2021
- The Gold Machine Beats: A Jungle Death Photo Album - Beat Scene, 2021
- Fever Hammers. Face Press. 2021. ISBN 978-1-913010-79-9.
- Fifty Catacomb Saints. Tangerine Press. 2022. ISBN 978-1-910691-81-6. (with artwork by Dave McKean, postscript by Chris McCabe)
- The London Adventures: House of Flies. Three Imposters. 2023. ISBN 978-1-838062-85-9.

== Filmography ==
As well as writing and directing a number of documentary and semi-documentary films, Sinclair has appeared as himself in a number of films by other directors:

Film performances
Year	Title	Notes
1967	Ah! Sunflower	Featuring Allen Ginsberg, Co-Directed by Robert Klinkert
1992	The Cardinal and the Corpse	Featuring Martin Stone, John Latham, Alan Moore, Driff Field, Brian Catling, Directed by Chris Petit
1997	The Falconer	Featuring Françoise Lacroix, Peter Whitehead, Stewart Home, Howard Marks, Francis Stuart, Directed by Chris Petit
2000	Asylum	Featuring Marina Warner, Michael Moorcock, Françoise Lacroix, Directed by Chris Petit
2002	London Orbital	Directed by Chris Petit
2009	The London Perambulator	Featuring Nick Papadimitriou, Russell Brand, Will Self, Directed by John Rogers
2012	Swandown	Featuring Alan Moore, Stewart Lee, Directed by Andrew Kötting
2013	Journeys to the End of the Light: a filmed interview	Featuring Kevin Ring, Directed by Sam Johnson
2015	By Our Selves	Featuring Toby Jones, Directed by Andrew Kötting
2016	London Overground	Featuring Andrew Kötting, Chris Petit, Cathi Unsworth, Bill Parry-Davies, Directed by John Rogers
2017	Edith Walks	Featuring Alan Moore, Claudia Barton, Jem Finer, Directed by Andrew Kötting
2019	The Whalebone Box	Featuring Steve Dilworth, Anonymous Bosch, Eden Kötting, Kirsten Norrie, Philip Hoare, Directed by Andrew Kötting
2021	The Gold Machine	Featuring Farne Sinclair, Directed by Grant Gee

== Discography ==
- Downriver, (UK, King Mob Records, CD), 1988
- Dead Lead Office - Poems 1970-2004, (UK, Optic Nerve, CD), 2004
- Stone Tape Shuffle, (UK, Test Centre, LP), 2012
- Edith Field Recordings with David Aylward, Anonymous Bosch, Andrew Kötting, Jem Finer, Claudia Barton, (UK, BadBloodandSibyl, CD), 2016
- London Overground with Standard Planets, (UK, Fin-A-Dee Six Records, 12" single), 2016
- Dark Before Dark with The London Experimental Ensemble, (USA, 577 Records, CD), 2021
