= Alison Settle =

British fashion journalist and editor (1891–1980)

- Settle in Vogue.
- Born: 18 January 1891; Clapham, London
- Died: 24 September 1980 (aged 89); Worthing, West Sussex, England
- Occupations: Journalist and fashion editor

Alison Towers Settle née Alison Violet de Froideville Fuchs (18 January 1891 in Clapham, London – 14 September 1980 in Worthing, Sussex) was a British fashion journalist and editor. Settle's career in fashion journalism spanned over seven decades, from the 1910s to the 1970s. She wrote for publications including The Observer and The Lady, edited British Vogue from 1926 to 1935, and belonged to government bodies tasked with improving British design and taste. Alison Settle's archive is located at the University of Brighton Design Archives.

== Personal life ==
She was the second child of Margaret (Maggie) Campbell Munro and Georg Friedrich Gotthilf Fuchs de Froidville, Premier Lieutenant of the Landwehr and descendant of the Central European aristocratic family Monod de Froideville. Her older brother was the zoologist Harold Munro Fox. In 1914, she became engaged to the barrister Alfred Towers Settle, marrying him four years later in November 1918. Alfred died of tuberculosis in 1925, leaving Settle with their two young children Margaret and John. She never remarried.

For forty years, she lived in Steyning, Sussex. She died in Worthing in September 1980, at 89. Her ashes were interred with her husband's in Barrow-in-Furness. A memorial service was held at St Brides Church, Fleet St where Hardy Amies and David Astor led the tributes.

== Career ==
Settle started work on Fleet Street in 1916, writing her first columns for The Daily Mirror. She was soon writing the women's pages of The Sunday Pictorial under the pen-name Kiki. By the early 1920s she was also writing a column for Eve magazine on society gossip.

In 1926, Settle became editor of British Vogue, working for Edna Woolman Chase, the American editor-in-chief of the three existing editions of Vogue, staying in her position for the next 9 years. Under her management, the magazine first employed Cecil Beaton and introduced features such as "Dressing on a Budget".

Settle left Vogue in 1935 under strained circumstances, spending the subsequent year writing the book Clothes Line, published in 1937. In the same year she also became the fashion editor of The Observer, retiring in 1960. A year after her retirement, she received the OBE for services to the journalism of fashion. She was also a fashion columnist for The Lady for 27 years until 1972, which ended after Settle had a serious accident in Paris. Her book Fashion As A Career was published in 1963.

Media offices
| Preceded by Dorothy Todd | Editor of British Vogue; 1926–1935 | Succeeded by Elizabeth Penrose |
