= Audrey Withers =

British magazine editor

Audrey Withers OBE
- Withers in 1953 by Lida Moser
- Born: 28 March 1905; Hale, Lancashire, England
- Died: 26 October 2001 (aged 96); London, England
- Occupations: Magazine editor, author
- Known for: Vogue
- Spouses: Alan Hay Stewart (m. 1933; div. 1952); Victor Asarius Kennett (m. 1953; died 1980)

Elizabeth Audrey Withers OBE (28 March 1905 – 26 October 2001) was an English journalist, also active as a member of the Council of Industrial Design. She edited the British magazine Vogue between 1940 and 1960 and was the author of The Palaces of Leningrad (1973) and an autobiography.

While she used her own name professionally, in some other contexts she was known by her married names, Mrs A. H. Stewart from 1933 to 1952 and Mrs Victor Kennett from 1953 until her death.

== Early life ==
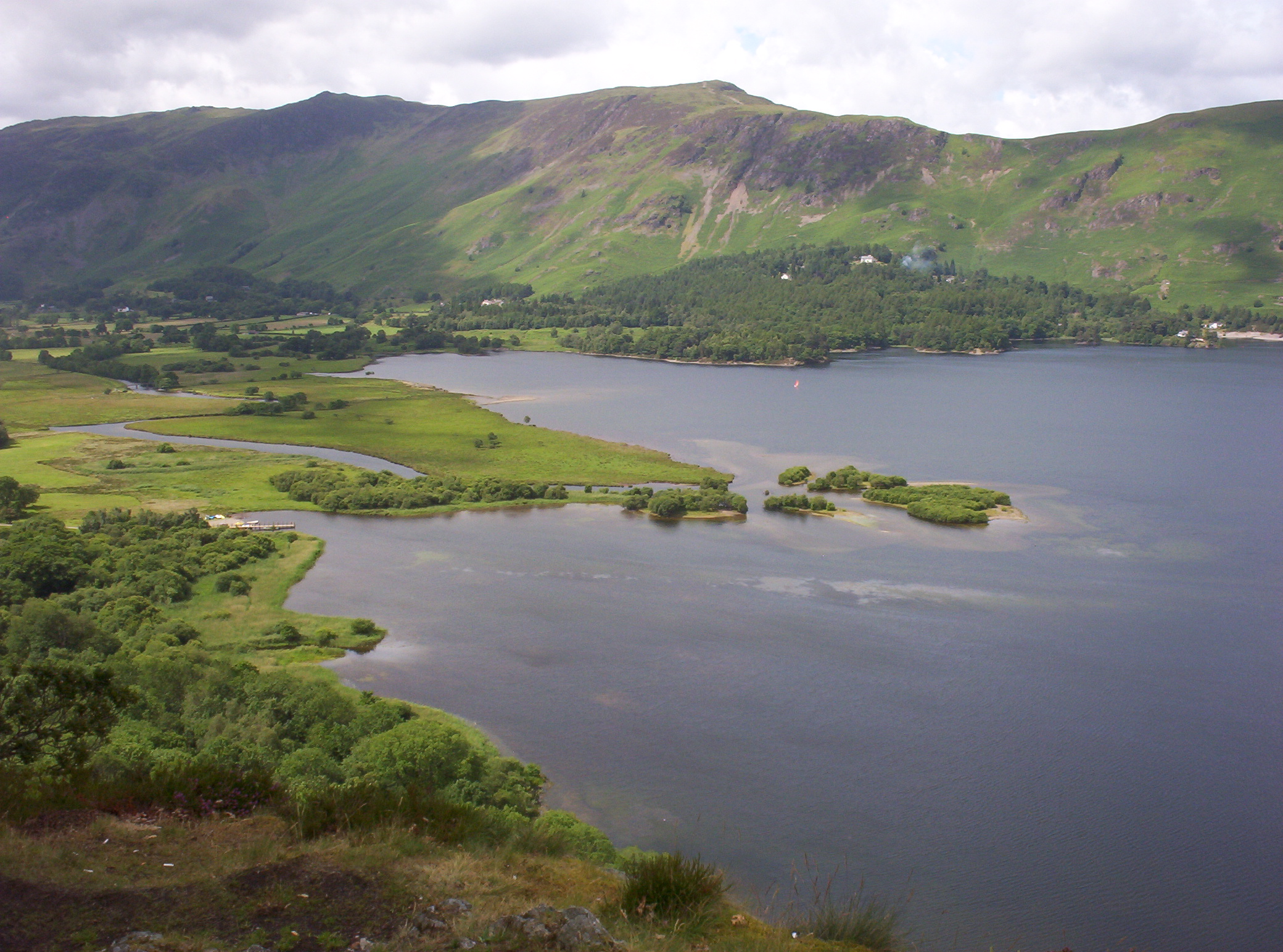
Derwent Water

Withers was born at Hale in Lancashire (a parish later transferred to Cheshire), the daughter of Dr Percy Withers (1867–1945), a physician and author, by his marriage to Mary Wolley Summers (1870–1947). Her mother, who had lost both parents at an early age, belonged to a family which owned John Summers & Sons, a company operating a steelworks on the Wirral, and was herself a graduate of Somerville College, Oxford. The family soon moved to the Lake District, where Withers grew up with an older sister and a younger brother on the shores of Derwent Water. The girls were first educated at home by a governess. Their father had literary friends, including the Poet Laureate, Robert Bridges, and the artist Paul Nash.

Withers went as a boarder to St Leonards School, St Andrews, then to Somerville, her mother's old college, graduating from Oxford in 1927 with a second in Philosophy, Politics and Economics.

== Career ==
Hoping for a career in publishing, Withers took a job in a London bookshop, J. and E. Bumpus, then worked in the advertising section of a book publisher. During the Great Depression she lost her job and was unemployed for several months, during which she lived on an allowance of £2 a week from an uncle. This gave her a sympathy for the political left, and she was a Labour supporter for most of her life, until she joined the SDP in the 1980s. In 1931 she secured a new job as a sub-editor on Condé Nast's Vogue. The magazine had a small staff and she rose quickly, so that in 1940 Harry Yoxall appointed her as editor. She also joined the Condé Nast board.

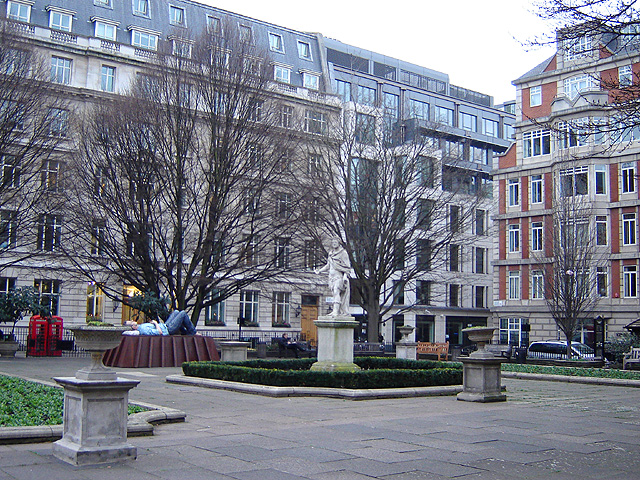
Golden Square, site of the Vogue offices

During the war years Condé Nast treated Vogue as part of the war effort, printing advice and information, often from British government ministries. Women's magazines were powerful, and Vogue was a favourite publication of the ruling class, making Withers one of the most influential women in the country. During the London blitz she printed the iconic photograph by Cecil Beaton of an impeccably dressed model alongside the bomb site of the Temple, London, with the caption "Fashion is indestructible". Also in 1940 photographs by Therese Bonney of women and children refugees in France appeared in the magazine.

On the home front, Withers joined the London Fire Brigade as a volunteer and acted as a driver to senior officers. She was disappointed to be given no chance of driving fire engines, despite gaining a heavy goods vehicle licence. She kept the offices of Vogue in Golden Square, Westminster, open, cycling to work. Meanwhile, Harvey Nichols advertised in Vogue "Especially designed gas protection costumes ... in oiled silk and available in dawn apricot, amethyst, eau-de-nil and rose pink". In the summer of 1944, the American photographer Lee Miller persuaded Withers to send her to Normandy to produce an article on nurses there, bringing Vogue into the actual coverage of the war; Withers was astonished by what came back, calling it "the most exciting journalistic experience of my war". She allowed Miller to follow the Allied advance through Europe, and Miller reported the liberation of Paris and even sent a story from Buchenwald.

After the end of the world war, Withers promoted advanced causes, and alongside its traditional coverage of beauty and fashion Vogue developed a highbrow streak, publishing articles by Simone de Beauvoir, Bertrand Russell, Marghanita Laski, Dylan Thomas, Kingsley Amis, and work by features editors Lesley Blanch, and later (1947–1955 Siriol Hugh-Jones. Elizabeth David wrote on food, while the critic Penelope Gilliatt got her start in a Vogue talent contest inaugurated by Withers. Her photographers included Norman Parkinson, Antony Armstrong-Jones and Irving Penn. She twice employed John Deakin as a staff photographer and twice dismissed him. Her personal style was frugal, preferring sandwiches to expensive restaurants and buses to taxis, and she became a member of the Council of Industrial Design.

Surprisingly, apart from hats, Withers lacked an interest in fashion, so she delegated fashion coverage to others. She later wrote

I am very well aware that I would not have been an appropriate editor of Vogue at any other period in its history. I had come up through copy-writing and administration, with no fashion training.

She resigned as editor of Vogue in 1960, sensing a wind of change.

== Personal life ==
On 2 September 1933 Withers married Alan Hay Stewart, a salesman known as "Jock", who was the son of a musician. The marriage was childless and ended in divorce in 1952. On 20 February 1953 she married Victor Asarius Kennett (1895–1980), a Russian photographer whom she had first met in New York City during the war. With her second husband she lived on a farm, and while still at Vogue divided her time between London and the country. After her retirement they travelled widely, not least in the Soviet Union.

With Kennett she produced a book, The Palaces of Leningrad (1973), the fruit of nine visits to the city. They also collaborated on the introduction to In the Russian Style (1975), edited by Jacqueline Kennedy Onassis. In the 1980s Withers became a volunteer in the membership department of David Owen's Social Democratic Party, a centre-left breakaway from the Labour Party. Many years after her husband's death she published an autobiography called Lifespan (1994) and herself died on 26 October 2001 at St Mary's Hospital, London, aged ninety-six.

== Honours ==
Withers was appointed Officer of the Order of the British Empire (OBE) in the 1953 New Year Honours.

In 1961 she was the winner of the Bicentenary Medal of the Royal Society of Arts, an award given to "a person who, in a manner other than as an industrial designer, has applied art and design to great effect as instruments of civic innovation".

== Notes ==
Media offices
Preceded by Elizabeth Penrose	Editor of British Vogue; 1940–1960	Succeeded by Ailsa Garland
