= Rachel Lichtenstein =

Rachel Lichtenstein is a writer, artist and archivist.

In 1999, she wrote Rodinsky's Room with Iain Sinclair, and since then she has published Rodinsky's Whitechapel (1999) and On Brick Lane (2007). This last will be joined by two other books, Hatton Garden and Portobello Road to form a trilogy on London street markets.

In 2003, she became the British Library's first Pearson Creative Research Fellow, producing a work entitled Add. 17469: A Little Dust Whispered – both as an installation within the Library, and a subsequent book.

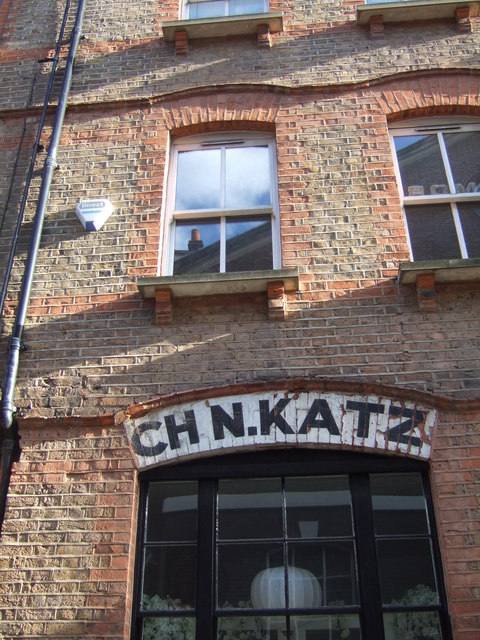
Ch.N.Katz was the last Jewish shop in Brick Lane, the story of this and other forgotten inhabitants of the area is told in Rodinsky's Room

== Works ==
=== Books ===
- Rodinsky's Room, with Iain Sinclair (Granta Books, 1999)
- Rodinsky's Whitechapel, (Granta Books, 1999)
- On Brick Lane, {Hamish Hamilton, 2007}
- Diamond Street: The Hidden World of Hatton Garden(2012)
- Estuary: Out from London to the Sea (Hamish Hamilton, 2016)

=== Installations ===
- Shoah (1993)
- Add. 17469: A Little Dust Whispered (2003)

== See also ==
- Museum of Immigration and Diversity
