= Man About Town (magazine) =

British men's magazine published from 1952 to 1968

- The innocent cover of Man About Town, summer 1956, featuring the magazine's mutton chops personification.
- Categories: Men's lifestyle
- Frequency: Quarterly then monthly
- Founded: 1952
- Final issue: 1968
- Company: Cornmarket
- Country: United Kingdom
- Language: English

Man About Town, later About Town and lastly Town, was a British men's magazine of the 1950s and 1960s. Press Gazette described it in 2004 as the "progenitor of all today's men's style magazines". It was the customer offshoot of the well-established weekly trade magazine for tailors, The Tailor & Cutter.

== John Taylor ==
John Taylor (1921–2003) had been interviewed for the editorship of The Tailor & Cutter in 1945, after being demobilised from the Royal Navy, but did not get the job. After his initial failure, he secured another chance and wore his "Fleet Air Arm uniform with gold pilot wings and lieutenant's rings" and this time he was successful. This lesson in the importance of clothes and style formed a lasting impression on Taylor. He went on to edit that magazine for 24 years and his weekly comments on the dress of celebrities, politicians and royalty attracted international attention and fame, transforming Tailor & Cutter into what The Times called "the most quoted trade magazine in the world".

== Man About Town ==
Man About Town began as a quarterly magazine in 1952 and Taylor's editing was typically irreverent, not least about the magazine itself. It was said that a subscription, at sixteen shillings, showed "that a fool and his money are soon parted" and included the statement "Man About Town is edited by John Taylor, but never mind".

Magforum said: "For [John] Taylor, Man About Town was a platform to indulge his interests in fine wines, especially champagne, good food, women and entertaining company" and the magazine once carried the slogan "women and various other bad habits".

Town photographic cover from 1962

The Press Gazette called Man About Town the "progenitor of all today's men's style magazines". In earlier editions it was personified by a middle aged man with a mustache and mutton chops who appeared on the cover as the main figure, or smaller leaning against the title and on the contents page inside. Later, the appearance and content of the magazine changed significantly as it took its place in the media of 1960s Swinging London. More photographs were printed and art director Tom Wolsey was important in helping photographers like Terence Donovan and Don McCullin become established. Mike Dempsey said of Wolsey's work: "The look of the magazine was dynamic in its use of typography, space to breathe and wonderful images." Also featured were cartoons by Michael Heath, Mel Calman and Gerald Scarfe.

== Takeover by Cornmarket ==
In 1960, the magazine was extracted from its Savile Row roots and used as the launch pad for the Cornmarket (later Haymarket) group when it was bought by Clive Labovitch and Michael Heseltine. Heseltine had done a property deal to fund the purchase of the magazine. He told The Financial Times that "major changes" were planned including a larger page size and a new type of binding. The magazine was selling around 30,000 copies per edition at the time.

Heseltine later told Campaign: "We bought a spin-off consumer magazine from the trade title, Tailor & Cutter. It was called Man About Town and had little to commend itself. A supplement to its parent, it was about the trade and for the trade. Clive [Labovitch] recruited a team that was to turn this tatty quarterly into a glossy monthly for men. In one sense we were ahead of the time. Men's fashion was at the margin of acceptability and men's magazines relied almost entirely upon their willingness to peddle soft porn. We were not in that business. The magazine relied for revenue on the advertising industry, and on the wish of art directors and copywriters to see their work displayed in this pace-setting publication."

The title was changed to About Town and, in 1962, just Town. The look of the new magazine was much more modern. The mutton chops were gone, replaced with photographic, rather than painted, covers with bold colour choices. However, the Press Gazette commented in 2004, it "was never the same without John's humour and originality".

A Town magazine cover from 1967. By this time the covers had become considerably more sexualised.

Also in 1962, Cornmarket bought the weekly news magazine Topic, which had only started in 1961, which it relaunched like Man About Town. The idea was to create a British version of Newsweek. The effort was a failure however, and nearly destroyed the company. Topic was incorporated into Town the same year. For a time it provided an apprenticeship for promising young writers who were spotted early in their career by Labovitch or Heseltine, among them two who went on to join the staff of the Sunday Times, Brian Moynahan and Peter Gillman.

Cover art in Town went through a number of different styles characteristic of the era, and continued to feature multiple topics. but towards the end in 1967 it had become far more sexualised so that the magazine began to look more like the porn magazines from which it had once sought to distance itself. The magazine ceased publication in 1968.

== Competition ==
The failure of Town and similar British non-pornographic men's magazines like Men in Vogue and the British version of Esquire in the 1950s, has been blamed on the smaller size of the market in the United Kingdom compared to the United States and competition for advertising from commercial television and newspaper colour supplements. The first colour supplement in the United Kingdom was for The Sunday Times, published in February 1962, and it was so successful that the paper gained a quarter of a million new readers. Soon, all the large Sunday newspapers had a similar section.

== See also ==
- Talk of the Town
- Town & Country
- Gentleman's Quarterly (GQ)
