= Men in Vogue =

British men's fashion magazine

- The first issue, November 1965, featuring Edward Fox
- Categories: Men's fashion
- Frequency: Quarterly or bi-annually
- Founded: 1965
- Final issue: 1970
- Company: Condé Nast Publications
- Country: United Kingdom
- Language: English

Men in Vogue was a British magazine of male fashion from the same publishers as Vogue. It was first published in 1965, and ceased publication in 1970. The magazine was closely associated with the peacock revolution in English men's fashion in the 1960s for which Christopher Gibbs, an editor of the shopping guide in Men in Vogue, was a style leader with his "louche dandyism". Other editors of the magazine were Robert Harling and Beatrix Miller.

== First issue ==
The first issue of the magazine was attached to the November 1965 Vogue. It featured, amongst other things:

- "A reference for Mellors", a short story by Anthony Powell on a Lady Chatterley theme.
- An extract from George Melly's biography, Owning Up.
- An article asking: "The Englishman: the best dressed man in the world?" Featuring James Astor, Cecil Beaton, Brinsley Black, Gay Kindersley, Nigel Lawson, Jocelyn Stevens (editor-in-chief of Queen), Sir Fitzroy Maclean, Christopher Gibbs, Lord Gormanston, Julian Ormsby-Gore.
- "The heroes of St Moritz": article about Tony Nash and Robin Dixon winning the world bobsleigh championship. Photographs by Terence Donovan.
- "The most Bailey girls in the world": an article in which David Bailey discussed women he found "different, mysterious and interesting". Included were Catherine Deneuve (Bailey's wife), Jean Shrimpton, Monica Vitti, Françoise Dorléac, Jeanne Moreau and Sue Murray.
- "Men and their cars". Showed racing driver Jim Clark in a Lotus Elan, Terence Donovan in a Rolls-Royce Silver Cloud II, Mark Boxer (editorial director of London Life) in a Rover 2000, Kevin Powell and a Mini Moke, Peter Sheridan and an Invicta 1930, Lord Snowdon and a Mini and Aston Martin DB5.
- "But you can get a girl with a gun" by Antonia Fraser.
- A special report on winter clothes that was also the cover feature. The models were all actors: Corin Redgrave, Edward Fox and Gilles Milinaire.
- "Narcissus revisited" grooming by Alan Brien.
- Christopher Gibbs' Shopping Guide to London.
- The fashion award for 1965: A worst-dressed man award for prime minister Harold Wilson.

== Later editions ==
The magazine featured designers including Michael Rainey, Rupert Lycett Green and Michael Fish (whose clothes were labelled "Peculiar to Mr. Fish"), and photographic features from David Bailey, Michael Cooper and Patrick Lichfield. The Autumn/Winter (November) 1966 issue included the famous photoshoot by Michael Cooper titled "Girls dress men to suit themselves" which featuring Tara Browne dressed by his wife Nicky Browne, and Brian Jones dressed by Anita Pallenberg (all pictured). Browne died months later in a car crash, according to some accounts causing the Beatles to write "A Day in the Life".

== Closure ==
The magazine ceased publication in 1970. The failure of Men in Vogue and similar British non-pornographic men's magazines like Town (formerly About Town and before that Man About Town) which closed in 1968, and the British version of Esquire in the 1950s, has been blamed on the smaller size of the market in the United Kingdom compared to the United States and competition for advertising from commercial television and newspaper colour supplements. The first colour supplement in the United Kingdom was for The Sunday Times, published in February 1962, and it was so successful that the paper gained a quarter of a million new readers. Soon, all the large Sunday newspapers had a similar section.

== See also ==
- Men's Vogue, the American men's edition of Vogue; launched in 2005
- Swinging London
