= Suicide Bridge =

1979 novel by Iain Sinclair

First edition

Suicide Bridge is a novel by Iain Sinclair.

The book examines the characters of William Blake's Jerusalem as influenced by their psychogeography. The book mixes poetry with prose essays.

== Bibliography ==
- Suicide bridge: a book of the furies; a mythology of the south & east. Albion Village Press. 1979.
- Lud heat and Suicide bridge. Granta Books. 7 March 2002. ISBN 978-1-86207-504-7.
