= British Vogue =

British fashion magazine

Vogue

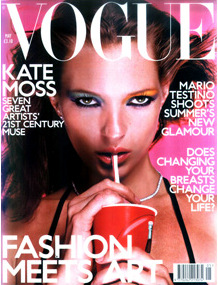
- Cover of the May 2000 issue, featuring Kate Moss
- Head of Editorial Content: Chioma Nnadi
- Categories: Fashion
- Frequency: Monthly
- Circulation: 1.8 million
- First issue: September 1916
- Company: Condé Nast Publications
- Country: United Kingdom
- Based in: London
- Language: English
- Website: vogue.co.uk

British Vogue (stylised in all caps) is the British edition of the American fashion magazine Vogue. The magazine was launched in 1916 by Condé Nast, linking together fashion and high society.

British Vogue is the third most profitable edition of Vogue worldwide (other than the American and Chinese editions).

== Background ==
British Vogue is the British edition of the American fashion magazine Vogue. The magazine is published monthly twelve times per year. Within the United Kingdom copies of the magazine come without the 'British' in the 'O' of the publications logo.

=== Editors ===
Editor-in-Chief/Head of Editorial Content	Start year	End year	Ref.
Vogue (1916–present)
Elspeth Champcommunal	1916	1922	
Dorothy Todd	1923	1926	
Alison Settle	1926	1934	
Elizabeth Penrose	1935	1939	
Audrey Withers	1940	1961	
Ailsa Garland	1961	1964	
Beatrix Miller	1964	1984	
Anna Wintour	1985	1987	
Liz Tilberis	1988	1992	
Alexandra Shulman	1992	2017	
Edward Enninful	2017	2023	
Chioma Nnadi	2023	present	

=== Editions ===
- Vogue Beauty Book, later as Vogue's New Beauty Book, then as Vogue Beauty Magazine, then as Vogue Beauty, then as Beauty in Vogue, then as Beauty Health & Slimming in Vogue, and finally as Beauty & Health in Vogue (from 1936 to 1939, 1950 to 1985)
- Vogue House & Garden Book (from 1936 to 1947, spun-off as House & Garden)
- Vogue Book of British Exports (from 1941 to 1954)
- Vogue New Zealand (as a spin-off of British Vogue, from 1957 to 1968)
- Vogue South Africa and Rhodesia, later Vogue South Africa (as a spin-off of British Vogue, from 1958 to 1966)
- Vogue Australia (as a spin-off of British Vogue, since 1959)
- Men in Vogue (from 1965 to 1970)

=== Circulation ===
Total print circulation (United Kingdom and international)
Year	2020	2022	2024
Circulation	682,709 (Note: Missing January and May to October issues)	1,764,164	1,821,693

== History ==
=== Early years under Chapcommunal, Todd, and Settle (1916–1934) ===
During the World War I, Condé Nast (publisher of Vogue) dealt with restrictions on overseas shipping and paper shortages in the United States. To answer the problem the decision was made to launch a British edition providing Vogue coverage across the British Isles, with the American edition unable to be shipped to Britain.

Under the editor Elspeth Champcommunal, articles included 'society and sporting news ... Health and beauty advice ... travelogues ... and editorials', making a 'skilfully mixed cocktail'.

Dorothy Todd became editor in 1923 and was renowned for her boldness, especially blending the arts and fashion. Under her leadership the magazine shifted its focus from fashion to literature, featuring articles from Clive Bell, Virginia Woolf, Aldous Huxley, and more. However, the magazine also lost much of its audience due to these changes and she was replaced by Alison Settle in 1926.

=== Pre and post-war under Penrose and Withers (1935–1960) ===
Audrey Withers became editor of the magazine in 1940 (replacing Elizabeth Penrose Howkins who edited the publication from 1935 to 1939). During the World War II the magazine reported on events of the war. In 1944, Lee Miller was sent to Normandy by Withers to produce an article on wartime nursing; then following the Allied advance through Europe reporting on the liberation of Paris and Buchenwald concentration camp.

=== Under Anna Wintour and Liz Tilberis (1985–1992) ===
Anna Wintour served as editor-in-chief from 1985 to 1987 before taking over House & Garden, editing the magazine for only ten months before becoming editor-in-chief of American Vogue, a position she held until stepping down in 2025.

Liz Tilberis then took over the magazine running the publication until 1992 when she joined Vogue's rival Harper's Bazaar in New York City as editor-in-chief.

=== Under Alexandra Shuman (1992–2017) ===
Under Alexandra Shulman the magazine drew over a million readers. Shulman developed collectors issues of the magazine such as the 'Gold Millennium Issue'. Shulman was also praised for her use of up and coming photographers like Mario Testino. Shulman pushed designers to stop using 'size-zero' models and attempted to 'change the face of fashion'.

In 2016, Shulman collaborated with photographer Josh Olins to shoot Catherine, Duchess of Cambridge on the cover of Vogue's centenary issue. The photographs were subsequently featured in the National Portrait Gallery, London The magazine under Shulman was the subject of Richard Macer's behind-the-scenes BBC documentary, Absolutely Fashion: Inside British Vogue (2016).

=== Current era under Enninful and Nnandi (2017–present) ===
Edward Enninful was confirmed as the new editor-in-chief of British Vogue on 10 April 2017. Condé Nast International chairman and CEO Jonathan Newhouse announced him as the successor to Alexandra Shulman, calling Enninful "an influential figure in the communities of fashion, Hollywood and music which shape the cultural zeitgeist", adding that "by virtue of his talent and experience, Edward is supremely prepared to assume the responsibility of British Vogue".

Enninful's first issue as editor-in-chief was 2017's December issue, featuring British model and activist Adwoa Aboah on the cover. In September 2019, Enninful collaborated with Meghan, Duchess of Sussex on the September issue. The issue highlighted "Forces for Change", and featured on the cover 15 women activists including actress Salma Hayek and interviews with former US First Lady Michelle Obama.

The magazine's September 2020 triple gatefold cover featured pictures of 20 activists often associated with the Black Lives Matter movement, including Marcus Rashford and Adwoa Aboah. The Activism Now edition was photographed by Misan Harriman and was the first British Vogue cover taken by a black man in the magazine's 104-year history (Nadine Ijewere was the first black female to take a cover photograph).

Actress Dame Judi Dench became the oldest person at age 85 to be featured on the June 2020 cover. In 2022, actor Timothée Chalamet became the first, solo male print cover star in the magazine's history.

In June 2023, Enninful announced his departure from the magazine and his last cover was the March 2024 issue.

Chioma Nnadi succeeded Enninful as editor, and was the first black woman to be head of editorial content at the publication.

== See also ==
- Vogue Australia, Australian edition in publication since 1959 (from 1952 as a British Vogue supplement)
- Men in Vogue, Men's edition in publication from 1965 to 1970
- List of British Vogue cover models
