= Rodinsky's Room =

1999 book by Rachel Lichtenstein and Iain Sinclair

- Author: Rachel Lichtenstein and Iain Sinclair
- Publisher: Granta Books
- Publication date: 1999
- ISBN: 1862072574

Rodinsky's Room (ISBN 1862072574) is a non-fiction book by the British authors Rachel Lichtenstein and Iain Sinclair, first published by Granta Books in 1999. Sections are written alternately by each author. It tells the story of Lichtenstein's attempts to uncover the story of the reclusive Jewish autodidact David Rodinsky, who disappeared in the late 1960s and whose room above a synagogue at 19 Princelet Street in the Spitalfields area in the East End of London was discovered undisturbed 20 years later.
