= Upside Down (Jack Johnson song) =

2006 single by Jack Johnson

Single by Jack Johnson

from the album Sing-A-Longs and Lullabies for the Film Curious George
- B-side: "Breakdown"
- Released: February 24, 2006
- Recorded: 2005
- Genre: Folk-pop; soft rock
- Length: 3:31
- Label: Brushfire; Universal; Columbia
- Songwriter: Jack Johnson
- Producers: Robert Carranza; Jack Johnson

Jack Johnson singles chronology
"Better Together" (2006)	"Upside Down" (2006)	"Talk of the Town" (2006)

"Upside Down" is a song written and performed by Jack Johnson, and used for the 2006 animated film Curious George. It is the first track and first single from the soundtrack album Sing-A-Longs and Lullabies for the Film Curious George, which was released in February 2006 (same month as theaters). A remix edition featuring Money Mark was released as a bonus track on some versions of Sing-A-Longs and Lullabies for the Film Curious George. "Upside Down" was a top-40 hit in the United States and the United Kingdom.

== Commercial performance ==
The song peaked at number 38 on the Billboard Hot 100 and was Johnson's only US top-40 hit until "You and Your Heart" in 2010. It debuted at number 45 on the UK Singles Chart the day before its physical release via download sales alone. The following week, it became Jack Johnson's second UK Top 40 entry, peaking at number 30. It has been certified Platinum by the RIAA for sales of over one million units in the United States.

== Music video ==
The music video begins with Johnson walking along a pier carrying a guitar as Curious George watches from a tree. Johnson then slips on a banana peel and falls into the ocean. He is then shown in place of the Man with the Yellow Hat in several scenes from the film. It's a blend of live-action and 2D animations, where it shows Johnson interacting with the animated George. The video was directed by prolific music video directors the Malloys.

== Track listing ==
=== CD single ===
1. "Upside Down"
2. "Breakdown"

== Charts ==
=== Weekly charts ===
Weekly chart performance for "Upside Down"
Chart (2006)	Peak position
Austria (Ö3 Austria Top 40)	36
Canadian Singles Chart	9
Czech Republic Airplay (ČNS IFPI)	53
Germany (GfK)	54
Ireland (IRMA)	48
Netherlands (Dutch Top 40)	28
Netherlands (Single Top 100)	56
New Zealand (Recorded Music NZ)	22
UK Singles (Official Charts)	30
US Billboard Hot 100	38
US Adult Alternative Airplay (Billboard)	1
US Adult Contemporary (Billboard)	23
US Adult Pop Airplay (Billboard)	9
US Alternative Airplay (Billboard)	25
US Billboard Jazz Songs	39

=== Year-end charts ===
Year-end chart performance for "Upside Down"
Chart (2006)	Position
Brazil (Crowley)	68
Netherlands (Dutch Top 40)	198
US Adult Top 40 (Billboard)	21

== Certifications ==
Certifications for "Upside Down"
Region	Certification	Certified units/sales
Australia (ARIA) Remix version	2× Platinum	140,000^{‡}
Brazil (Pro-Música Brasil)	2× Platinum	120,000^{‡}
Canada (Music Canada)	2× Platinum	160,000^{‡}
Denmark (IFPI Danmark)	Platinum	90,000^{‡}
Germany (BVMI)	Gold	150,000^{‡}
Italy (FIMI)	Gold	25,000^{‡}
New Zealand (RMNZ)	4× Platinum	120,000^{‡}
United Kingdom (BPI)	Platinum	600,000^{‡}
United States (RIAA)	Platinum	1,000,000^{*}
^{*} Sales figures based on certification alone.^{‡} Sales+streaming figures based on certification alone.

== Release history ==
Release dates and formats for "Upside Down"
Region	Date	Format	Label(s)	Ref.
United States	June 6, 2006	Contemporary hit radio	Brushfire; Republic; Universal	
