= Hippodrome, London =

Historic building and casino in London

Coordinates: 51.5114°N 0.1286°W

London Hippodrome
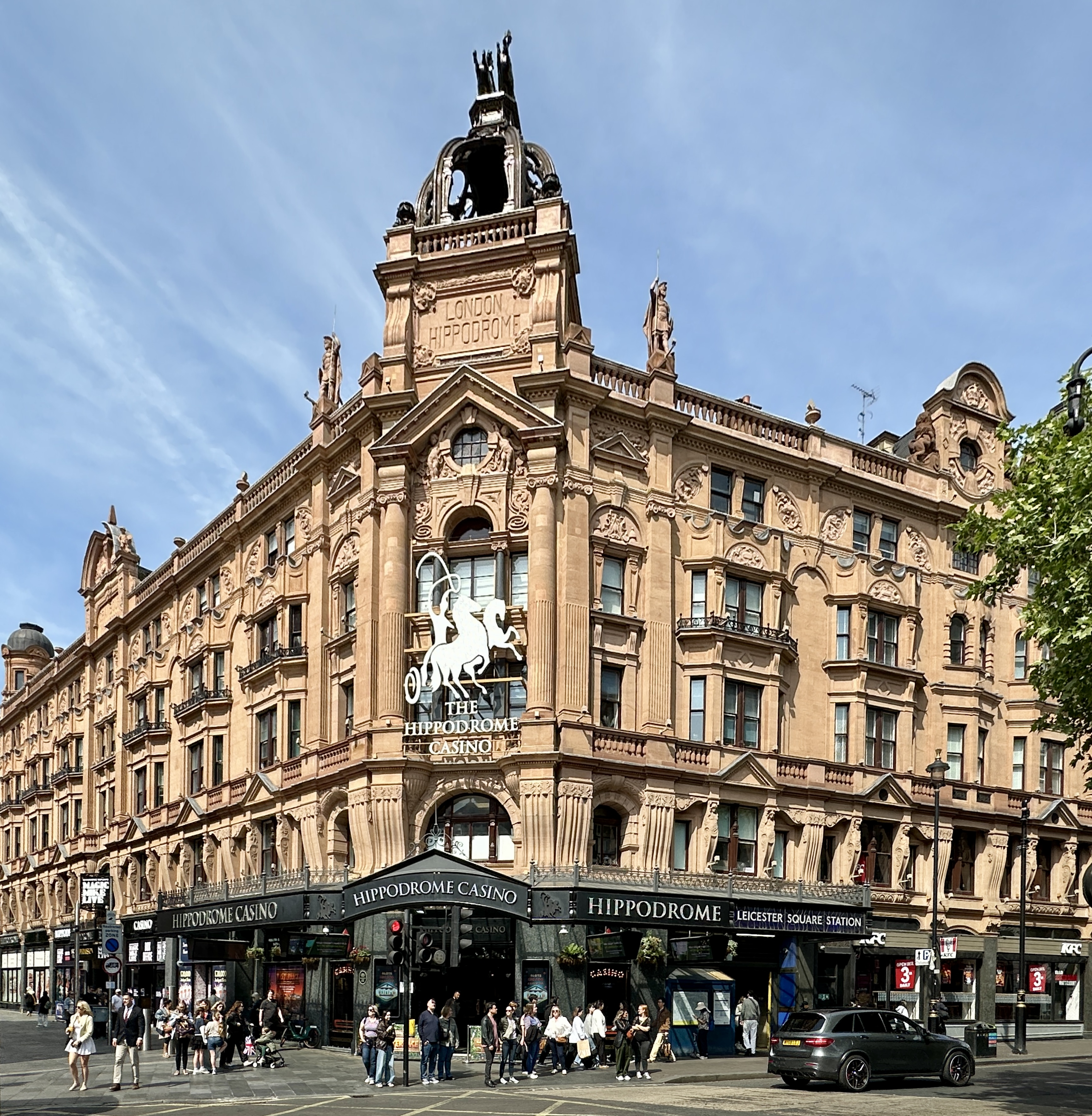
- London Hippodrome in 2026
- Interactive map of London Hippodrome
- Address: Charing Cross Road; Westminster, London
- Capacity: 1340 seated (1909)
- Type: circus and variety shows
- Designation: Grade II listed
- Current use: Casino

Construction
- Opened: 1900
- Rebuilt: 1958
- Architects: Frank Matcham

Listed Building – Grade II
- Official name: The London Hippodrome, Crown Public House, and 7-10 Cranbourn Street
- Designated: 9 January 1970
- Reference no.: 1066287

Website
- hippodromecasino.com

The Hippodrome is a building on the corner of Cranbourn Street and Charing Cross Road in the City of Westminster, London. The name was used for many different theatres and music halls, of which the London Hippodrome is one of only a few survivors. Hippodrome is an archaic word referring to places that host horse races and other forms of equestrian entertainment.

== History ==
=== Hippodrome ===
The London Hippodrome was opened in 1900. It was designed by Frank Matcham for Moss Empires chaired by Edward Moss and built for £250,000 as a hippodrome for circus and variety performances. The venue gave its first show on 15 January 1900, a music hall revue entitled "Giddy Ostend" with Little Tich. The conductor was Georges Jacobi.

Entry to the venue was through a bar, dressed as a ship's saloon. The performance space featured both a proscenium stage and an arena that sank into a 230 ft, 100,000 gallon water tank (about 400 tons, when full) for aquatic spectacles. The tank featured eight central fountains, and a circle of fountains around the side. Entrances at the side of the auditorium could also be flooded, and used for the entry of boats. Shows included equestrian acts, elephants and polar bears, and acrobats would dive from a minstrels' gallery above a sliding roof, in the centre of the proscenium arch. The auditorium featured cantilevered galleries, removing the columns that often obstructed views in London theatres, the whole was covered by a painted glass retractable roof, that could be illuminated at night. The building included the headquarters of Moss Empires.

=== Theatre 1909–1951 ===
In 1909, it was reconstructed by Matcham as a music-hall and variety theatre with 1340 seats in stalls, mezzanine, gallery and upper gallery levels. It was here that in 1910 Tchaikovsky's Swan Lake received its English première in the form of Act 2 with Olga Preobajinska as the Swan Queen. The Albert de Courville revues were performed here from December 1912.

The Hippodrome hosted the first official jazz gig in the United Kingdom, by the Original Dixieland Jazz Band, in 1919.

Its reputation was for revue and musical comedy, among them The Five O'Clock Girl, the West End production of Vincent Youmans' hit Broadway musical Hit The Deck (1928) and also Mr. Cinders, both in 1929; Ivor Novello's Perchance to Dream in 1945 with Margaret Rutherford; and the revue High Spirits in 1953 with Cyril Ritchard and Diana Churchill. Julie Andrews made her stage debut here at the age of 12. From 1949 to 1951 it was the London equivalent of the Folies Bergère.

=== The Talk of the Town ===
The original interior was demolished in 1958, and Bernard Delfont had the Hippodrome converted into the nightclub The Talk of the Town. It featured appearances by many of the popular artistes of the time, including Diana Ross & The Supremes, Judy Garland, Eartha Kitt, Shirley Bassey, The Temptations, Frank Sinatra, Mel Torme, Sammy Davis Jr., Lena Horne, Sergio Franchi, Sophie Tucker, Engelbert Humperdinck, Dusty Springfield, Val Doonican, Lonnie Donegan, The Carpenters, John Denver, Ella Fitzgerald, Liza Minnelli, Tom Jones, Cleo Laine, The Jackson 5, Buddy Rich, Lulu, Danny La Rue, Cilla Black, Petula Clark, Paul Anka, Glen Campbell, Anne Murray, Sandie Shaw, Johnnie Ray, Matt Monro, The Andrews Sisters, Dolores Gray, Frankie Vaughan, Cliff Richard, The Shadows, Channing Pollock (magician), Dionne Warwick, Raphael, The Seekers, Stevie Wonder, Sacha Distel and Neil Sedaka.

In February 1964, Ethel Merman made her only British appearance in a season of cabaret. Dusty Springfield recorded a TV special at the venue, broadcast 15 February 1968 on BBC2 Show of the Week: Live at the Talk of the Town. The Seekers' final concert was recorded for the album The Seekers Live at The Talk of the Town in July 1968. Tony Bennett set his 1972 series for Thames Television, Tony Bennett at the Talk of the Town, there. This form of entertainment, in its turn, fell out of public favour, and the venue closed in 1982.

In 1970, the Hippodrome was designated a Grade II listed building, as part of the complex including the neighbouring Crown pub and 7-10 Cranbourn Street.

In 2009, the Hippodrome was named by the Brecon Jazz Festival as one of 12 venues which had made the most important contributions to jazz music in the United Kingdom.

The musical drama End of the Rainbow, nominated for a number of Olivier Awards in 2011 during its London run and Tony Awards in 2012 while on Broadway, is set at the Talk of The Town during a Judy Garland engagement there near the end of her life.

=== The London Hippodrome ===
Renovated yet again, the building was reopened as a nightclub/restaurant called The London Hippodrome by nightclub tycoon Peter Stringfellow in 1983. Some years later, Stringfellow sold it to a chain company called European Leisure. Under the stewardship of David Chipping the club went on to win many BEDA and DI awards, regularly attracting crowds in excess of 2,000. Following its sale to Luminar, the club soon went out of fashion. It was not until April 2004 that the Hippodrome regained its standing, when it was transformed into Cirque at the Hippodrome. The interior was taken back to hues of reds and golds, and burlesque was the theme. Cirque at the Hippodrome won the BEDA award for best UK nightclub in 2004.

It was reported in October 2005 that the club had lost its public drinks licence and would no longer be able to serve alcohol, as the local police did not want what they called "vertical drinking" (the majority of patrons standing rather than sitting) in Leicester Square. The police also shut down most of the venues in the local area. Following this, in December 2005, the club was eventually forced to close, following reports of violence involving rival gangs after they had left the building of the Hippodrome, which reflected on its closure later in Westminster licensing court.

=== The Hippodrome Events Space & Theatre ===
In January 2006, entrepreneur Charmaine Haig took over the lease of the Hippodrome building on a short term before a casino licence application could be secured for future use. Haig initially maintained and managed the empty venue on her own, and then changed the venue's name back to the London Hippodrome from its previous name of Cirque.

Shortly afterward, Haig's in-house events company, Hip Events, began running private events in the venue, but once again using the space to its full capacity as a variety venue with album launches, dance shows, gala dinners, awards ceremonies and Leicester Square film premiere after parties.

In 2008, Haig and her business partner acquired a theatre licence for the venue and subsequently turned the venue back into a theatre. The adult cabaret show La Clique was found at the Edinburgh Fringe Festival in August 2008; by the beginning of October 2008, the show previewed at the London Hippodrome with great success, and stayed running until the end of Haig's Hippodrome lease in June 2009. During this time, the show La Clique at the Hippodrome won an Olivier Award in 2009, in the "Best Entertainment" category.

=== The Hippodrome Casino ===
In 2009, the lease on the Hippodrome was acquired by Leicester-born father and son entrepreneurs Jimmy and Simon Thomas, who began an extensive restoration programme taking the Hippodrome back to Matcham's original designs for use as a casino and entertainment venue. During the planning stage, the adjacent Cranbourn Mansions building became available and plans were redrafted to incorporate this former gentlemen's apartment block into the design, doubling the eventual floorspace and linked using a new structure sited within the existing light well between the two buildings.

Investment in the building reportedly came to over £40 million, the funds being raised by the Thomas family from the sale of a number of bingo halls prior to the UK smoking ban, which made it illegal to smoke within an enclosed workplace, on 1 July 2007.

The Hippodrome Casino was opened on 13 July 2012 by Mayor of London Boris Johnson, who described it as "yet another ringing endorsement of London as a great place to invest".

The venue on opening included four floors of gaming, including a Gold Room casino sited in the original basement with access directly into Chinatown to the rear of the building, Heliot restaurant, six bars, a smoking terrace and The Matcham Room cabaret theatre.

In January 2013 the casino was awarded Best Land-based Casino at the Totally Gaming Awards, which also gave Jimmy Thomas a Life Achievement award for his contribution to the gaming and entertainment industries.

On 4 March 2013, Simon Thomas announced the opening of PokerStars LIVE, a collaboration between the Hippodrome and PokerStars, the world's largest online poker website. While initially on the fourth floor, in 2020 PokerStars LIVE moved to the third floor where it currently resides.

The Matcham Room at the Hippodrome Casino mounted a production of the wartime musical Miss Nightingale in 2018, and is currently the home of Magic Mike Live London (created and produced by Channing Tatum).

In 2020, construction was completed on an expansion of the fourth floor smoking area to include gaming, and the creation of 'The Rooftop', a new bar and dining space, on the fifth floor.

== See also ==
- Hammersmith Palais
- Live at the Talk of the Town (disambiguation)
