= Driff Field =

British antiquarian

Xavier Driffield (1948-) also known as Driff Field, drif field, driffield, dryfeld or simply Drif, was a figure in the British bookdealing world during the 1980s and 1990s and published several editions of the acerbic Driff's Guide to secondhand and antiquarian bookshops in Britain.

== History ==
Driffield started as a booksearcher, obtaining titles to order for private customers, and in 1984 began producing a self-published guide to All The Secondhand and Antiquarian Bookshops in Britain (also titled In Quest of the Perfect Book : The Antiquarian Bookshop Catalogue & Directory). The guide was idiosyncratic and often sarcastic, with entries such as: "the b[oo]ks are slowly transforming themselves back into rags"; "judging by body temp, shop seems to have expired in 1930"; "I could smell a bargain, pity was I had a cold that day"; "owner has been unwell recently with bad back (possibly caused by turning on the customers once too often)".

His Guide introduced a number of acronyms, including "ETGOW (easy to get on with), "NSOC (not strong on condition)", "FARTS (follows around recommending the stock)" and "WYLAH (watches you like a hawk)". Among the entries in the Guides's Terminology chapter was "book fairy" describing people who sell books at book fairs.

Driffield also launched a periodical called Driffs: The Antiquarian & Second Hand Book Fortnightly, although the magazine was rarely published as frequently as that and folded after 22 issues.

The Guide went through at least five editions, dated 1984, 1987, 1991, 1992, and 1995. In the third he seemed to refer to a spell of mental illness after the publication of the second, though Francis Wheen thought this an intentionally misleading reference.

== Sexual assault acquittal ==
Although photos existed of Driffield, for a long time little was known about him or his current whereabouts, or even if he was still alive, until 2014, when he was the defendant in a trial at Snaresbrook Crown Court, accused of indecent assault, indecency with a child and rape. In November 2014 Driffield was found not guilty on all the charges.

He stood trial under the name Xavier Driffield, although previously some sources had cited his name (seemingly erroneously) as "B.C.M. Driffield", others as "Colin Driffield" and yet others as "David Richard Ian Frederick Field". He claimed to have been brought up in Newbury, England. In 1991, Francis Wheen considered that he "seems to be in his forties".

== In popular culture ==
Drif appears as a character in Iain Sinclair's novel White Chappell, Scarlet Tracings. He appeared in the 1992 documentary The Cardinal And The Corpse, made by Chris Petit for Channel 4 and also featuring Alan Moore and Iain Sinclair.

== Sources ==
- Sinclair, Iain (17 August 2003). "Driffield (or, The Man Who Thought He Looked Like Raymond Carver)". Talk of the Town. Independent on Sunday.

== See also ==
- Hay on Wye, a town of secondhand bookshops
