= Sing-A-Longs and Lullabies for the Film Curious George =

Jack Johnson and Friends: Sing-A-Longs and Lullabies for the Film Curious George

Soundtrack album by Jack Johnson
- Released: February 7, 2006
- Recorded: November 2005
- Studio: The Mango Tree
- Genres: Folk rock; soft rock; pop
- Length: 40:10
- Labels: Brushfire, Universal
- Producers: Robert Carranza; Jack Johnson

Jack Johnson chronology
In Between Dreams (2005)	Jack Johnson and Friends: Sing-A-Longs and Lullabies for the Film Curious George (2006)	Sleep Through the Static (2008)

Singles from Jack Johnson and Friends Sing-A-Longs and Lullabies for the Film Curious George
- 1. "Upside Down" Released: February 24, 2006; 2. "Talk of the Town" Released: July 28, 2006

Professional ratings
Review scores
Source	Rating
Allmusic	3.5/5 stars
Rolling Stone	3/5 stars

Sing-A-Longs and Lullabies for the Film Curious George is a soundtrack album for the 2006 animated film Curious George consisting of newly-recorded music by Jack Johnson "and Friends". It was released on February 7, 2006. The "Friends" are Ben Harper, G. Love, Matt Costa, and Kawika Kahiapo, each of whom accompanies Johnson and his band on one track.

The album topped the charts in Australia, New Zealand, and Canada, where it remained at No. 1 for four consecutive weeks. On February 25, it became the first soundtrack to reach the top of the U.S. Billboard 200 chart since the Bad Boys II soundtrack in August 2003, and the first animated film to top the chart since the Pocahontas soundtrack reigned for one week in July 1995.

== Track listing ==
All tracks are written by Jack Johnson, except as noted.

Sing-A-Longs and Lullabies for the Film Curious George track listing
No.	Title	Writer(s)	Length
1.	"Upside Down"		3:28
2.	"Broken"		3:55
3.	"People Watching"		3:19
4.	"Wrong Turn"		2:53
5.	"Talk of the Town"		3:22
6.	"Jungle Gym" (featuring G. Love)	Garrett Dutton	2:24
7.	"We're Going to Be Friends" (covering The White Stripes)	Jack White III	2:18
8.	"The Sharing Song" (lead vocals: Zach Gill & Adam Topol (Jack on backup).)	Zach Gill; Adam Topol	2:45
9.	"The 3 R's" (adapted from the Schoolhouse Rock! song "Three Is a Magic Number")	music: Bob Dorough; revised lyrics: Jack Johnson	2:55
10.	"Lullaby" (featuring Matt Costa)	Matt Costa	2:48
11.	"With My Own Two Hands" (covering and featuring Ben Harper)	Ben Harper	2:59
12.	"Questions"		4:10
13.	"Supposed to Be"		2:54
Total length:			40:10

Bonus track on some editions of the album
No.	Title	Length
14.	"The 3 R's" (Money Mark Remash)	2:26

Alternative bonus track
No.	Title	Length
14.	"Upside Down [Remix]" (featuring Money Mark)	3:39

== Personnel ==
- Jack Johnson – vocals, guitar, ukulele
- Adam Topol – drums, vocals on "The Sharing Song"
- Merlo Podlewski – bass guitar
- Zach Gill – piano, vocals (lead vocals on "The Sharing Song")
- Ben Harper – guitar and vocals on "With My Own Two Hands"
- G. Love – vocals, guitar, and harmonica on "Jungle Gym"
- Matt Costa – vocals and guitar on "Lullaby"
- Kawika Kahiapo – guitar on "Talk Of The Town"
- Child backing vocals on "The Sharing Song" and "The 3 R's" – Baillie, Kayla, Jaclyn, Torin, John, Noa, Kona, Moe, Thatcher, Brooke, Tahnei

== Charts ==
=== Weekly charts ===
Weekly chart performance for Sing-A-Longs and Lullabies for the Film Curious George
Chart (2006)	Peak position
Australian Albums (ARIA)	1
Austrian Albums (Ö3 Austria)	3
Belgian Albums (Ultratop Flanders)	48
Belgian Albums (Ultratop Wallonia)	50
Canadian Albums (Billboard)	1
Dutch Albums (Album Top 100)	9
Finnish Albums (Suomen virallinen lista)	25
French Albums (SNEP)	42
German Albums (Offizielle Top 100)	3
Irish Albums (IRMA)	54
Italian Albums (FIMI)	33
New Zealand Albums (RMNZ)	1
Norwegian Albums (VG-lista)	26
Portuguese Albums (AFP)	5
Scottish Albums (Official Charts)	28
Swiss Albums (Schweizer Hitparade)	2
UK Albums (Official Charts)	15
US Billboard 200	1
US Top Rock Albums (Billboard)	1
US Soundtrack Albums (Billboard)	1

=== Year-end charts ===
Year-end chart performance for Sing-A-Longs and Lullabies for the Film Curious George
Chart (2006)	Position
Australian Albums (ARIA)	49
Austrian Albums (Ö3 Austria)	41
Dutch Albums (Album Top 100)	63
French Albums (SNEP)	146
German Albums (Offizielle Top 100)	27
Swiss Albums (Schweizer Hitparade)	26
UK Albums (OCC)	83
US Billboard 200	46
US Top Rock Albums (Billboard)	9
US Soundtrack Albums (Billboard)	4

== Certifications ==
Certifications for Sing-A-Longs and Lullabies for the Film Curious George
Region	Certification	Certified units/sales
Australia (ARIA)	Platinum	70,000^{^}
Brazil (Pro-Música Brasil)	Platinum	60,000^{*}
Denmark (IFPI Danmark)	Gold	20,000^{^}
Germany (BVMI)	Platinum	200,000^{‡}
Japan (RIAJ)	Gold	100,000^{^}
New Zealand (RMNZ)	Platinum	15,000^{^}
Switzerland (IFPI Switzerland)	Platinum	40,000^{^}
United Kingdom (BPI)	Gold	100,000^{^}
United States (RIAA)	Platinum	1,000,000^{^}
^{*} Sales figures based on certification alone.^{^} Shipments figures based on certification alone.^{‡} Sales+streaming figures based on certification alone.
