= Ailsa Garland =

British journalist (1917–1982)

Ailsa Garland (1917–1982) was a British fashion journalist. She worked for a number of newspapers and magazines, most notably as the editor of British Vogue from 1960 to 1964. In addition to her work, she was a broadcaster on television and radio.

Born Ailsa Mary Garland in 1917 in London, she was educated at the La Retraite Convent, London, and Heathneld House, Cardiff. She married John Rollit Mason in 1948.

From 1947 to 1950, Garland worked as Fashion Editor for the Vogue Export Book, then from 1952 to 1953 she was editor for Shopping magazine. In 1953 she became fashion editor for the Daily Mirror. She has been listed alongside Alison Adburgham of The Guardian and Ernestine Carter of The Sunday Times as one of the most influential British-based fashion journalists of the decade. In 1960 The Spectator reported that Garland had left the Mirror in order to join British Vogue as part of a greater change of the magazine's focus away from luxury and exclusivity.

After leaving Vogue in 1964, Garland became editor-in-chief of Woman's Journal, at that time the largest women's magazine in the UK. In 1965 she launched Man's Journal, an equivalent publication aimed towards the male reader, with designer Hardy Amies as its first guest editor. She stayed with Woman's Journal until 1968. During the last couple of years, 1967–68, Garland also edited a magazine called Fashion. As editor of Fashion, Garland was asked to choose the Dress of the Year for 1968, for which she picked out a dress by Jean Muir and shoes by Bally. In 1975 Garland was Fashion Coordinator for IPC Magazines Ltd.

In 1970, Garland published her autobiography, Lion's Share. She died in 1982.

Media offices
| Preceded by Audrey Withers | Editor of British Vogue; 1960–1964 | Succeeded by Beatrix Miller |
