= Scarpe =

Scarpe may refer to:

- Scarpe (river), in France
  - Battle of Arras (1917), a World War I British offensive that included three engagements called Battle of the Scarpe
  - Battle of the Scarpe, a 1918 World War I battle
- Scarpe Mountain, on the Alberta-British Columbia border, Canada
- USS Scarpe, a United States Navy patrol vessel of World War I
- Scarpe, in heraldry, a type of ordinary

== See also ==
- Scarp (disambiguation)
