= Cranbourn Street =

Street in central London

Coordinates: 51°30′41.68″N 0°7′39.82″W

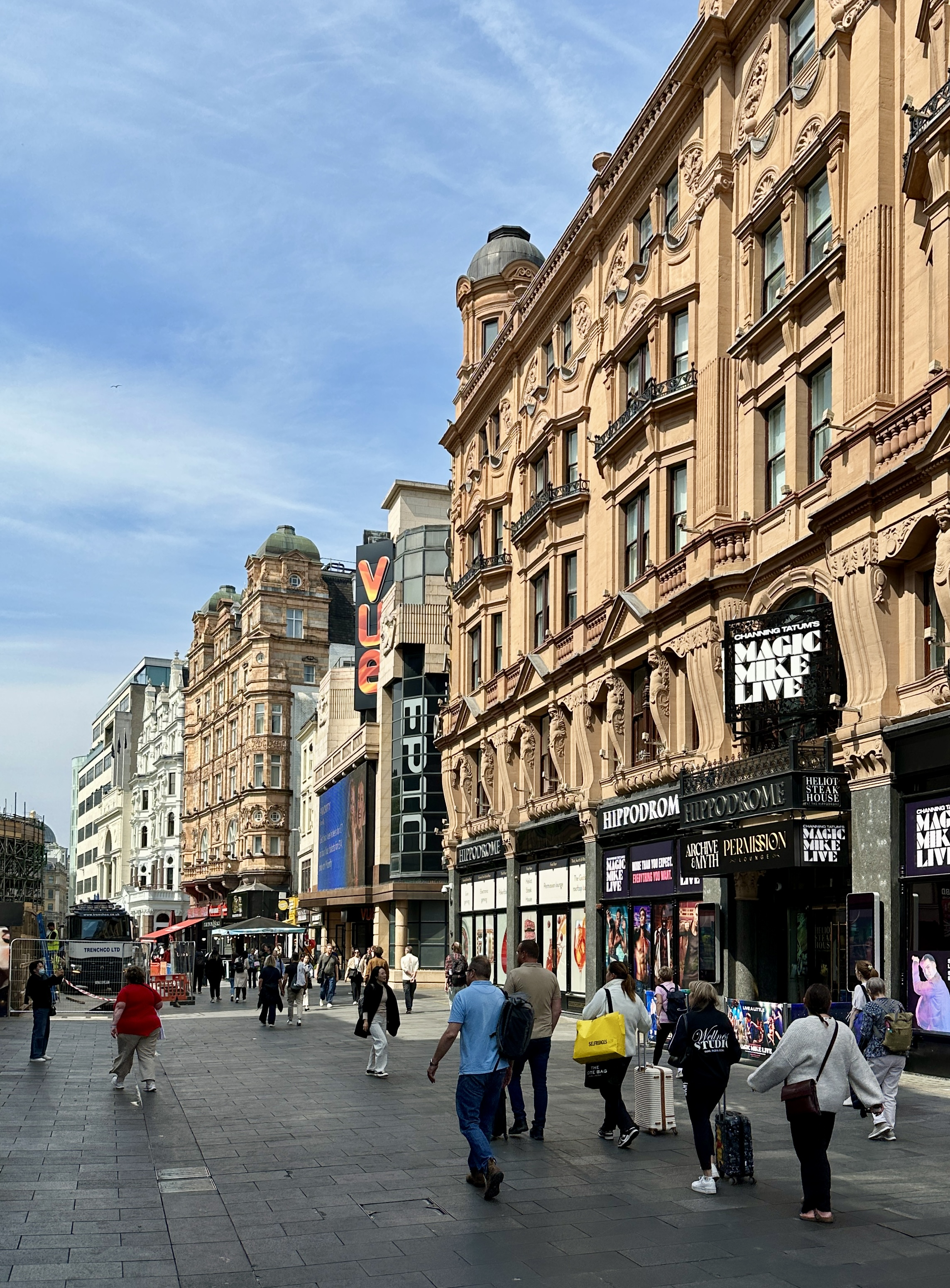
Cranbourn Street with the London Hippodrome visible on the right

Cranbourn Street is a street in Central London. It connects Leicester Square to Long Acre via Charing Cross Road.

The street was constructed in the 1670s, and named after the Earl of Salisbury's country estate of Cranborne, Dorset. It originally connected Leicester Square to Castle Street, and was largely complete by 1681–2. William Hogarth served an apprenticeship in a shop on the street in 1713, and his two sisters were presumed to run a nearby linen-draper's shop.

The street was widened in 1843, connecting Coventry Street to Long Acre. Cranbourn Passage, an alley connecting the street northwards to Little Newport Street, was demolished in the 1880s in order to construct Charing Cross Road. The London Hippodrome was sited on Cranbourn Street; in 1957 it was converted into the Talk of the Town, a combined theatre and restaurant. After the Talk of the Town closed in 1982, the Hippodrome was acquired by nightclub owner Peter Stringfellow who turned it into Stringfellow's, the UK's first 'super club.'
