= Marc Atkins =

English artist

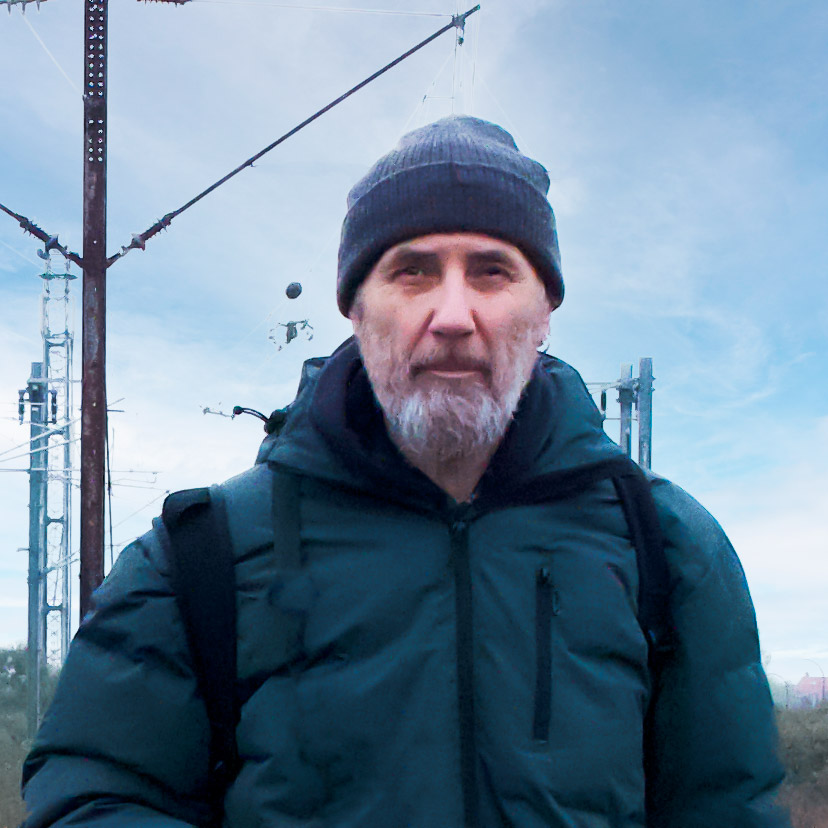
- Marc Atkins

Marc Atkins (born 1962) is an English artist. His practice includes sculpture, drawing, photography, video and prose poetry. His work is held in collections including Tate and the National Portrait Gallery, London. His publications include The Teratologists, Thirteen, Warszawa, Faces of Mathematics and The Logic of the Stairwell.

== Life and education ==
Atkins attended Stafford College of Art and Design, where he gained a distinction, and Cheltenham School of Art, where he received a first class honours degree in sculpture. He undertook postgraduate studies at the Jan Van Eyck Academie in the Netherlands, in performance, video, film and photography.

He later moved to Rome, returning to London in 1991. From 1993 to 1994, he was assistant professor at the University of Windsor, Canada.

== Artistic practice ==
Atkins' artistic practice includes sculpture, drawing, photography, video and prose poetry. In 1999, he was the subject of a portfolio in HotShoe International, with an essay by Mark Durden on his work. Durden wrote that Atkins' work was concerned with "the margins" and described Atkins' vision of London as "crepuscular".

Atkins' photographic publications include The Teratologists, Thirteen, Warszawa and Faces of Mathematics. In an essay on Warszawa in The Liberal, Rod Mengham discussed Atkins' Warsaw photographs in relation to urban memory, architecture and postwar space.

Mengham also wrote on Atkins' series Equivalents in the journal Performance Research, discussing the photographs in relation to permanence, disappearance, point of view and the instability of the photographic image.

Atkins has also worked in performance, video and installation. A 1997 profile in Entropy characterised Atkins' photography and performance as closely connected parts of his practice, discussing his work in relation to place, urban space, the darkroom and the staged image. In 1992, Atkins participated in a programme of British performance art at De Melkfabriek in Den Bosch, alongside artists including Brian Catling, Nigel Slight, Helena Goldwater, Monica Ross and Tara Babel.

== Image and text collaborations ==
Atkins' image and text collaborations include projects with the writers Iain Sinclair and Rod Mengham. His photographs appeared in Sinclair's Lights Out for the Territory (1997), a book on London walking, memory and urban history. Reviewing the book in The Times, Peter Ackroyd wrote that "the mysterious photographs of Marc Atkins complete the process".

Atkins and Sinclair later published Liquid City (1999), a book combining Atkins' photographs with Sinclair's writing. Reviewing the book in The Observer, Stephanie Merritt wrote that it "reverses the balance" of the earlier partnership by "foregrounding Atkins's photographs".

In The Times Literary Supplement, Anthony Rudolf wrote that the photographs in Liquid City could stand on their own without the text, while also describing the work of Atkins and Sinclair as an interaction between two "great jazz soloists".

Atkins' image and text practice has also been discussed in relation to poetry and photography. Drew Milne's essay "Corners of the Eye: Collaborations in Contemporary Poetry and Photography", published in Works on Paper in 2002, discussed Atkins' work with Sinclair and Rod Mengham within wider image and text practices.

The collaboration was also discussed in architectural criticism. In AA Files, William Firebrace reviewed Liquid City alongside Patrick Keiller's Robinson in Space, considering both works in relation to London, authorship and urban representation.

== Writing ==
Atkins has published three collections of prose and poetry: The Prism Walls, The Logic of the Stairwell and Silent Street.

== Reception ==
Critical discussion of Atkins' work has addressed his photography, writing and image and text collaborations. In a review of Liquid City for Blueprint, Joe Kerr described the book as "a work of collaboration" and wrote that Atkins' photographs captured "an essence of London".

Reviewing a 2000 exhibition at the Foundry in The Guardian, Jonathan Jones described Atkins as "a dark-edged photographer of London's hidden places, secret histories and sinister 'characters'", and wrote that his photography captured "an urban state of mind".

Reviewing The Logic of the Stairwell in The Warwick Review, Barbara Bridger wrote about Atkins' "accumulating images" and compared his atmosphere of place to Djuna Barnes' Nightwood.

Reviewing the South Bank Photo Show at the Royal Festival Hall in Time Out London, Sarah Kent described Atkins' contribution as a "Beckett-like scenario" and "a neatly conceived tautology".

Stephen Gardiner reviewed Liquid City in The London Magazine, noting the importance of Atkins' photographs within the work.

In The Kenyon Review, Rod Mengham discussed Atkins' photographs in relation to Liquid City and Lights Out for the Territory, describing the books as "companion pieces".

In The Village Voice, Simon Reynolds described Liquid City as "an easier entry point" than Lights Out for the Territory, writing that its text "takes a back seat to the photography of Marc Atkins". Reynolds described the "lustrous darkness" of Atkins' high contrast black and white photographs as bringing out the book's "articulate shadows" and "the hauntedness of urban space".

In 2015, Ars Poetica published Several Views of the Multilayeredness of British Artist Marc Atkins, a series of essays on Atkins edited by Michel Delville.

The French journal Le Passant Ordinaire published "The Journey to an Empty Room", an article on Atkins' work.

== Collections ==
Several of Atkins' works are in the Tate collection. The National Portrait Gallery, London holds 11 photographic portraits by Atkins.

== Selected publications ==
- The Prism Walls. Contraband Books. ISBN 978-1-91031-901-7.
- Still Moving, photography with poetry by Rod Mengham (Veer Books ISBN 978-1-907088-64-3)
- The Logic of the Stairwell, prose and poetry (Shearsman Books ISBN 978-1-84861-161-0)
- Silent Street, prose poetry (Shearsman Books ISBN 978-1-84861-570-0)
- The Teratologists, photography (panoptika ISBN 0-9534371-0-8)
- Liquid City, photography with text by Iain Sinclair (Reaktion Books ISBN 1-86189-037-0)
- Thirteen, photography with text by thirteen writers, including Julian Rathbone, Bill Drummond, James Sallis, Mick Farren, Stella Duffy and Nicholas Royle (The Do-Not Press ISBN 1-899344-86-1)
- Warszawa, photography with poetry by Tadeusz Pióro and Andrzej Sosnowski (WIG Press ISBN 83-87014-99-0).
- The World's Top Photographers: Nudes, also includes the work of Guy Bourdin, Bettina Rheims, Robert Mapplethorpe and Rankin (RotoVision ISBN 2-88046-823-X)
- The Nude, also includes the work of Bill Brandt and Ralph Gibson (RotoVision ISBN 2-88046-533-8)
- Faces of Mathematics, solo photography with introductions by Nick Gilbert, and also with text by the participants, including Michael Atiyah (panoptika ISBN 0-9534371-1-6)

== Selected exhibitions ==
- 2018: Equivocal Form, Ambiguous Function: Drawings and Photo-Drawings, Velorose, London.
- 2015: Marc Atkins, a retrospective exhibition at Galerie Wittert, Université de Liège, Liège, Belgium.
- 2001: The Teratologists, Standpoint Gallery, London.
- 2001: Atopos, former Poznański textile factory, Łódź, Poland.
- 2000: Marc Atkins, Foundry, London.
- 1999: Liquid City, 291 Gallery, London.
- 1994: Footfalls Echo in the Memory, 450 Broadway Gallery, New York City.
- 1992: South Bank Photo Show, Royal Festival Hall, London.
