= Museum of Immigration and Diversity =

Museum in London, England

Coordinates: 51.5199°N 0.0725°W

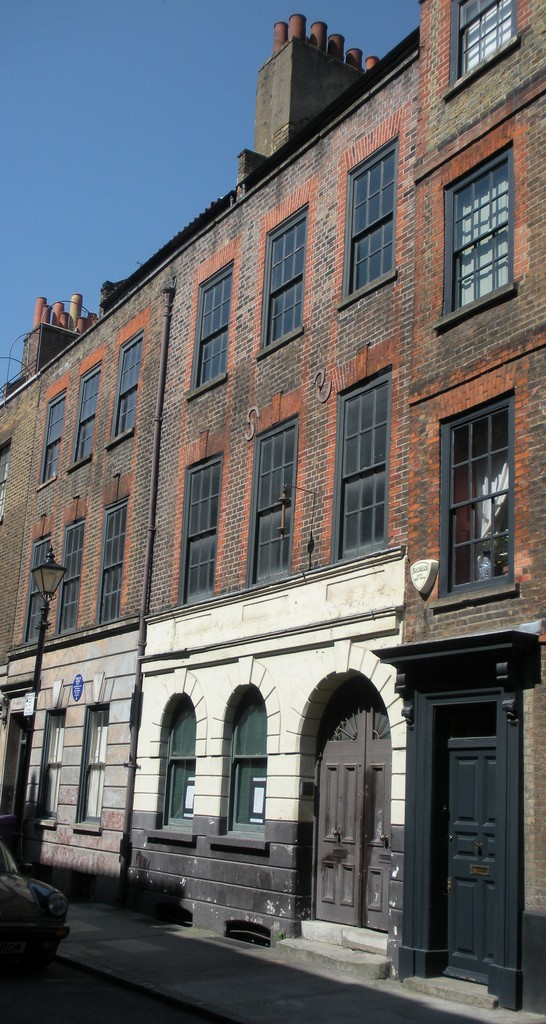
19 Princelet Street, Spitalfields, London

The Museum of Immigration and Diversity is a museum at 19 Princelet Street in Spitalfields, in the London Borough of Tower Hamlets, England. The Grade II* listed building in which the museum is located was a house built in 1719 for the Huguenot silk merchant Peter Abraham Ogier.

The house went through a number of stages, the building was converted to a synagogue in 1869. The building remained in use until the 1970s, when the congregation had moved out of the area. It has now been passed to a charity, The Spitalfields Centre, set up in 1983 to preserve the building and develop the museum of immigration and diversity.

Due to the fragility of the building, as of 2023 the museum only opens for prebooked group visits. It has been given £30,000 by English Heritage for repairs and is on the Buildings at Risk Register.

== See also ==
- History of the Jews in England
- List of former synagogues in the United Kingdom
- Rodinsky's Room, book about the occupant of a room above the synagogue
