= Elizabeth Penrose Howkins =

American fashion journalist

- Born: Elizabeth Webb Penrose; April 1, 1900; Johnson County, Wyoming, US
- Died: January 10, 1972 (aged 71); New York City, US
- Education: Chestnut Hill College
- Spouse(s): Lloyd B Averill; Walter Ashby Howkins

Elizabeth Penrose Howkins (née Penrose, 1900–1972) was an American fashion journalist who was the editor of British Vogue, and Glamour, and women's news editor for The New York Times in the 1950s.

== Early life ==
She was born on April 1, 1900 in Johnson County, Wyoming, the daughter of James Norman Penrose and Julia Corcoran. Wyoming was the family's summer home, and they otherwise lived in Philadelphia. She was educated there at Chestnut Hill College (then known as Mount Saint Joseph College).

== Career ==
Penrose began her career in 1924 working in the publicity department of the publisher E. P. Dutton. From 1931 to 1933 she worked as a merchandise editor of American Vogue magazine.

In 1934, after Alison Settle was sacked, Penrose was sent to London to address British Vogue's "excessively sprightly nature". Penrose was Condé Nast's "protégé and likely mistress".

In 1939, Penrose came to the United States and was unable to return to England due to the outbreak of the Second World War. She resumed working for American Vogue. In 1941 she became managing editor of Glamour magazine. She worked there until 1954.

In 1955 Penrose went to work for The New York Times as women's news editor, She retired in 1965.

== Personal life and death ==
Her first marriage was to Lloyd B Averill (1891-1956), a First World War aviator and hotel businessman. They divorced in 1938 "on grounds of extreme cruelty and neglect to provide". In 1952, she married retired British Army Officer and financial consultant Colonel Walter Ashby Howkins.

She died on January 10, 1972 in New York City.
