= Nick Papadimitriou =

British writer (born 1958)

- Born: 1958 (age 67–68); Finchley, Middlesex, United Kingdom
- Occupation: Travel writer
- Notable work: Scarp

Nick Papadimitriou (born 1958 in Finchley, Middlesex), nicknamed the "London perambulator" after the short film about him produced by John Rogers in 2009, is a British writer with a keen interest in the topography of the London region.

== Biography ==
Papadimitriou started to "conscious walk" the region of London in the late 1980s. He describes the activity of walking and exploring as a cathartic phenomenon worth nurturing, and feels that landscapes shape his mind as he progresses onward. He has collected around 2,000 maps and historical documents about the region.

In 2007, Papadimitriou wrote and designed the "Middlesex County Council" website, a collection of articles intended "not only to explore and present the historic legacy of old Middlesex, but also to examine the way in which the county-region still coheres as a distinct entity at the topographic and imaginative levels".

Between 2009 and 2011, Papadimitriou co-hosted, with John Rogers, two series of a radio show on Resonance FM entitled Ventures and Adventures in Topography. The first series examined a number of early-twentieth-century 'rambling' books which explored the suburbs of London through the eyes of forgotten authors such as S. P. B. Mais and Gordon S. Maxwell, while the second series took a more general if still somewhat esoteric approach to walking in the urban fringes of the capital. Papadimitriou's interest in and identification with the former county of Middlesex featured in a number of these broadcasts.

In 2013, Nick Papadimitriou published the book Scarp. Part autobiography, part fiction, part travelogue, and written after decades of hiking and discoveries in and around London, the book focused on the ridge of land to the north of the city's suburbs which Papadimitriou refers to as the North Middlesex/South Hertfordshire Tertiary Escarpment. Papadimitriou also provided material to Will Self for his book The Book of Dave.

== Books ==
- Foul Deeds and Suspicious Deaths in Barnet, Finchley and Hendon, Wharncliffe Books, 19 Feb 2009 (ISBN 978-1845630645)
- Scarp, Sceptre, 9 May 2013 (ISBN 978-1444723397)

== Filmography ==
Papadimitriou was the subject of a documentary film made by John Rogers in 2009 featuring Russell Brand, Will Self and Iain Sinclair, in which he spoke of his practice as Deep Topography.

Film performances
Year	Title	Notes
2009	The London Perambulator	Filmed and directed by John Rogers

== Prizes ==
- 2012 New Voice by Granta

== See also ==
- Psychogeography
- The Mill Field
