= Dorothy Todd =

British magazine editor

Dorothy Todd (1883–1966) was a British magazine editor.

During her time as editor of British Vogue from 1922 to 1926, Todd altered the magazine's interest and content from fashion to a broader inclusion of modernist literature and art. Unlike her predecessor, Elspeth Champcommunal, who focused on fashion, travel, and trends, Todd included works by modernists such as Wyndam Lewis, Gertrude Stein, Clive Bell, Virginia Woolf, and Aldous Huxley. Much of "the failure of [her] Vogue to sustain itself within the specific context of Condé Nast's corporate structure and the general context of British culture in the 1920s" can probably be attributed to its progressive nature and "significant subcultural context" Todd was fired from Vogue by Condé Nast in 1926 for taking the magazine in a direction he did not approve of. When Todd tried to sue for breach of contract she was told that her "private sins" would be exposed if she did so, which may have referred to her lesbianism but may also have referred to her illegitimate daughter, Helen. In 1982, Madge Garland reflected that the firing and blackmail was rooted in homophobia, writing: "in the days when homosexuality was a criminal offence he [Condé Nast] was not above using the direct threat of disclosure to avoid paying up for a broken contract."

Affectionately known as 'Dody', Todd was born in 1883, and during her time as editor, lived in Chelsea, London with her lover and British Vogue's fashion editor, Madge Garland. Their friend Freddie Ashton produced a ballet in 1926 entitled A Tragedy of Fashion, featuring two characters designed to parallel Todd and Garland.

== Publications and life after Vogue ==
Todd published British Vogue for four years, between 1922 and 1926.

She published The New Interior Decoration with Raymond Mortimer in 1929. It was dedicated to Madge Garland.

She ran a gallery for a short time in the 1930s, published an essay about Marion Dorn's work in the Architectural Review and held a job as a social worker during World War Two.

She published an English translation of Le Corbusier's Sur les Quatre Routes in 1947, and an English translation of a biography of Metternich in 1953.

== Personal life ==
Todd's personal life is only known in part. Her father was Christopher Todd, who was a wealthy property developer living and working in London. Her mother was his second wife, Ruthella Hetherington. The family, writes Lisa Cohen in All We Know: Three Lives, "lived in one of his grander properties, a large house on the newly developed Cromwell Road." After Christopher's death, Ruthella spent most of what he left behind, preventing the money from going to his children - Todd included.

Dorothy's daughter Helen was born in Paris in 1905. She grew up believing that Dorothy was her aunt, and this was how Dorothy presented their relationship publicly. Helen's paternity is unknown, but it is possible that she was conceived through sexual abuse. Helen often lived with Dorothy and her various girlfriends in her youth, and was sent to university in Oxford in the late 1920s.

Dorothy's most famous and perhaps significant relationship was with Madge Garland, who she promoted to fashion editor of British Vogue while they worked there together. They lived together in a flat in Chelsea until the late 1920s, after being fired from British Vogue and until the contents of the flat were seized by bailiffs settling Dorothy's debts. The flat was "a beautiful house for parties", in the words of Garland, and attendees included Olivia Wyndham, Cecil Beaton, Florence Mills and Dorothy Wilde. Todd's presence in Garland's life is sometimes painted in a negative light, but Garland herself stated that "Other people will say she ruined my life, she ruined my marriage, she gave me a terrible time. To hell. I have no regrets at all. She fostered me and she helped me. She opened many doors. I repaid that debt in full, because I supported her later in life. But I owed her more than I could ever repay."

Near the end of her life, while she was living in Cambridge in the 1960s, Todd wooed a young Italian woman who left her husband to be with her.

French historian Emmanuel Todd is Dorothy Todd's great-grandson.
