= Talk of the Town (Jack Johnson song) =

Single by Jack Johnson

from the album Sing-A-Longs and Lullabies for the Film Curious George
- B-side: "Fall Line"
- Released: July 28, 2006
- Genre: Soft rock
- Length: 3:23
- Label: Universal
- Songwriter: Jack Johnson
- Producers: Robert Carranza; Jack Johnson

Jack Johnson singles chronology
| "Upside Down" (2006) | "Talk of the Town" (2006) | "Imagine" (2007) |

"Talk of the Town" is a song written and sung by Jack Johnson released as the second single from the album Sing-A-Longs and Lullabies for the Film Curious George.

It was the follow-up single to the worldwide hit "Upside Down". It peaked at the Dutch Singles Chart at #96. Johnson performed the song with Kawika Kahiapo.

== Track listing ==
CD single

1. "Talk of the Town"
2. "Fall Line" (live, with Matt Costa)

== Charts ==
Chart performance for "Talk of the Town"
| Chart (2006) | Peak position |
|---|---|
| Netherlands (Single Top 100) | 96 |
