= Steve Dilworth =

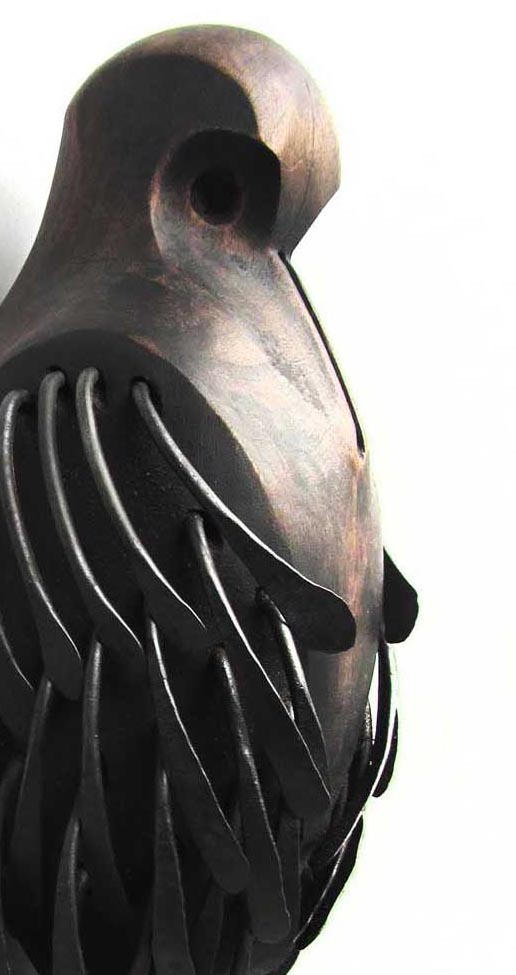
Woodcock rosewood, nails and woodcock STEVE DILWORTH

Steve Dilworth was born in Yorkshire in 1949 and studied sculpture at Maidstone College of Art. Since 1983, he has lived and worked on the Isle of Harris, Scotland.

Dilworth is known for his use of 'once living and found material, often held inside outer forms of wood, bone, stone and bronze. He also incorporates elements drawn directly from land and seascape, such as calm water, storm water, mountain air, the North wind and darkness. These are elements gathered at a particular time and place, in an exacting way that sit right on an edge between concept and material, the physical and metaphysical. He also uses the concept of sound and its absence in objects such as Air Rattle (1992)'

Dilworth's sculpture has been described as a ‘resurrectionist act' transforming raw material with great skill into objects that have a connection with deep-time. The starting point for his work is the energy or charge of raw material with the artist as a channel.

Notable public sculpture includes Walrus (1996) Ferens Art Gallery, Kingston Upon Hull, Ark (2000-2003) King's Place, London, Venus Stone (2007) and Claw (2006) commissioned by the Cass Sculpture Foundation, Case (2007) at the University of Aberdeen, Scotland and Fish Box (1990), Inverness Museum and Art Gallery, formerly part of the Scottish Arts Council Collection. One of Dilworth's most important works, the Hanging Figure (1978-79) was purchased by the Richard Harris Collection, Chicago, USA in 2011.

== Additional material ==
- Macfarlane, R. (2012). The old ways: A journey on foot. London: Viking Penguin. Chapter 8, "Gneiss", chronicles a visit with Steve Dilworth, his home and studio, and his nearby land art.
