= Beatrix Miller =

British fashion and cultural magazine editor

Beatrix Miller CBE
- Born: Beatrix Molineux Miller; 29 June 1923
- Died: 21 February 2014 (aged 90)
- Other names: Miss Miller; Bea
- Education: University of Paris
- Occupation: Magazine editor
- Title: Editor of British Vogue
- Term: 1964–1985
- Predecessor: Ailsa Garland
- Successor: Anna Wintour
- Awards: Commander of the Order of the British Empire (1986)

Beatrix Molineux Miller, CBE (29 June 1923 – 21 February 2014) was a British fashion and cultural magazine editor. She was editor of Queen from 1958 to 1964, and editor of British Vogue from 1964 to 1985.

== Early life ==
Miller was born on 29 June 1923. Her father was a doctor and her mother was a nurse; they had met on the Western Front during World War I. She was brought up in Rudgwick, Sussex, England. At the age of 15, she was evacuated to Ottawa, Ontario, Canada, where she lived with an uncle and aunt for the duration of World War II. She was educated to the age of 17 by tutors and later studied for six months at the University of Paris.

== Career ==
Miller began her career as a secretary. After the war, she worked with MI6 in Germany, and at the Nuremberg Trials. She rarely spoke about those two years of her life.

She began her journalistic career as a secretary for The Queen, a British society magazine. She also wrote features for the magazine, and ended her period there as features editor. In 1956, she moved to New York City, where she joined the American edition of Vogue as a copywriter. In 1958, The Queen was bought by Jocelyn Stevens and Miller was invited to return to the magazine as editor. She changed the renamed Queen into a magazine for young women rather than one aimed at the older, traditional socialite.

In 1964, she became editor of the British edition of Vogue. Her final issue of the magazine was the largest ever at 470 pages. Under her editorship, the magazine had become "the glossy bible to high-fashion". She retired in 1984. In 1966, she chose Donyale Luna for the March 1966 cover of British vogue, the first African-American to be on the cover of Vogue.

== Later life ==
After her retirement, Miller, Terence Conran and Jean Muir set up a think tank to serve as a link between the government and the fashion industry. She also served as a member of the council of the Royal College of Art, a postgraduate institution in London specialising in art and design.

In retirement she lived in a cottage in Wiltshire. She had planned to write a memoir titled Life After a Fashion or Life to the Letter but never completed it.

She died on 21 February 2014.

== Personal life ==
Miller never married nor had any children. Any relationships she did have were kept secret. She was known as Miss Miller by members of staff at Queen and Vogue, and as Bea by those close to her.

== Honours ==
In the 1985 New Year Honours, Miller was appointed Commander of the Order of the British Empire (CBE) in recognition of her service as editor of British Vogue.

Media offices
Preceded by ?	Editor of Queen; 1958–1964	Succeeded by Dennis Hackett
Preceded by Ailsa Garland	Editor of British Vogue; 1964–1984	Succeeded by Anna Wintour
