= Talk of the Town (magazine) =

British arts supplement

Talk of the Town was a short-lived quality arts supplement distributed with London copies of the UK Independent on Sunday newspaper from 2003 to 2004.

Talk of the Town only lasted some 60 issues, or just over a year, and was unusual because of its limited distribution, quality presentation and exclusive list of contributors. Each had a cover design by Andre Carrilho, usually featuring a caricature of the subject of that issue's main feature, including Billy Bragg, Rupert Murdoch, Colin Thubron, Bartley Gorman, Quentin Blake, Princess Diana, Martha Graham, Patrick Leigh Fermor, Morrissey, Brian Sewell, Diana Mosley, Peter Blake, Frank Gehry, Michael Foot, Driff Field, Michael Barrymore, Ronald Searle and J. G. Ballard.

The magazine, edited by Ian Irvine, was similar in format to The Spectator and Punch magazine, consisting of around 50 pages of columns and features by Robert Hanks, Cole Moreton, Tania Glyde, Ben Thompson and others. Most issues featured a Michael Heath cartoon. Guest contributors included Jonathan Myerson, Martin Rowson, Rhoda Koenig and Geoff Dyer. Each issue contained either a short story or an extract from a then-new novel by writers including Ballard, A. S. Byatt, Tibor Fischer, Clare Morrell, Russell Hoban, Isabel Vane, Carol Birch, Maggie Gee, Andrea Levy, Joe Sacco, Laurence Ellis, Toby Litt, Leslie Chamberlain, Jonathan Sim, William Brookfield, Leslie Forbes and M. John Harrison.

Although not all articles and subjects were London-centred, regular features include Secret London (obscure buildings, shops and amenities), London Lives (eccentric residents) and London Observed (a black-and-white reportage photo from the early- to mid-20th century).
