= Live at the Talk of the Town =

Live at the Talk of the Town may refer to:

- Live at the Talk of the Town (Stevie Wonder album)
- Live at the Talk of the Town (The Seekers album)
- Live at the Talk of the Town, album by Blue Mink
- Live at the Talk of the Town, album by Rolf Harris
- Live at the Talk of the Town, album by Cliff Richard
- Live at the Talk of the Town, album by Frankie Vaughan
- Live at the Talk of the Town, album by Raphael
- Live at Talk of the Town, album by Shirley Bassey
- Tom Jones Live! at the Talk of the Town, album by Tom Jones

== See also ==
- Live at London's Talk of the Town, album by Diana Ross and The Supremes
- Live at London's Talk of the Town (The Temptations album)
