= Derrick Morgan =

Jamaican musician (born 1940)

- Born: 27 March 1940 (age 85)
- Origin: Clarendon, Jamaica
- Genres: Rocksteady, reggae, ska
- Instrument: Vocals
- Labels: Beverley's Records, Treasure Isle, Crab Records, Burning Sounds Records, Secret Records

Derrick Morgan OD (born 27 March 1940) is a Jamaican musician who was popular in the 1960s and 1970s. He worked with Desmond Dekker, Bob Marley, and Jimmy Cliff in the rhythm and blues and ska genres, and he also performed rocksteady and skinhead reggae.

== Biography ==
In 1957, Morgan entered the Vere Johns Opportunity Hour, a talent show held at the Palace Theatre in Kingston. He won with rousing impressions of Little Richard and, shortly after that, was recruited to perform around the island with the popular Jamaican comedy team Bim and Bam.

In 1959, Morgan entered the recording studio for the first time. Duke Reid, the sound system boss, was looking for talent to record for his Treasure Isle record label. Morgan cut two popular shuffle-boogie sides "Lover Boy", a.k.a. "S-Corner Rock", and "Oh My". Soon after, Morgan cut the bolero-tinged boogie "Fat Man", which also became a hit. He also found time to record for Coxsone Dodd.

In 1960 Morgan became the only artist ever to fill the places from one to seven on the Jamaican pop chart simultaneously. Among those hits were "Don't Call Me Daddy", "In My Heart", "Be Still", and "Meekly Wait and Murmur Not". But it was the following year that Morgan released the biggest hit of his career, the Leslie Kong production of "Don't You Know", later retitled "Housewives' Choice" by a local DJ. The song featured a bouncing ska riddim, along with a duet by Morgan and Millicent "Patsy" Todd.

"Housewives' Choice" began the rivalry between Morgan and Prince Buster, who accused Morgan of stealing his ideas. Buster quickly released "Blackhead Chiney Man", chiding Morgan with the sarcastic put-down "I did not know your parents were from Hong Kong" – a swipe at Kong. Morgan returned with the classic "Blazing Fire", in which he warns Buster to "Live and let others live, and your days will be much longer. You said it. Now it's the Blazing Fire". Buster shot back with, "Watch It Blackhead", which Morgan countered with "No Raise No Praise" and "Still Insist". Followers of the two artists often clashed, and eventually the government had to step in with a staged photo shoot depicting the rivals as friends.

Morgan had a major success in 1962 with "Forward March", a song celebrating Jamaican independence from Great Britain.

In the mid-1960s, when ska evolved into rocksteady, Morgan continued to release top quality material, including the seminal rude boy songs, "Tougher Than Tough", "Do the Beng Beng", "Conquering Ruler", and a cover of Ben E. King's soul hit, "Seven Letters". Produced by Bunny Lee, "Seven Letters" is often cited as the first true reggae single. In 1969 Morgan recorded the skinhead anthem "Moon Hop" (on Crab Records). However, failing eyesight then forced him to give up regular stage appearances. He remained popular in Jamaica and the UK into the early 1970s, and has lived primarily in the UK or the US since the late 1960s.

Morgan has written several songs that have won the Festival Song Contest for other artists, including "Jamaica Whoa" (1998, Neville Martin), "Fi Wi Island A Boom" (2000, Stanley Beckford), and "Progress" (2002, Devon Black).

In July 2002 in Toronto, Ontario, Canada, a two-night "Legends of Ska" concert was held. Reuniting were The Skatalites, Lloyd Knibb, Rico Rodriguez, Lloyd Brevett, Lester Sterling, Johnny Moore and Lynn Taitt; along with Prince Buster, Alton Ellis, Owen Gray, Lord Creator, Justin Hinds, Derrick Harriott, Winston Samuels, Roy Wilson, Patsy Todd, Doreen Shaffer, Stranger Cole, Lord Tanamo, and Derrick Morgan. In 2007, Morgan appeared on the bill at the annual Augustibuller music festival. His song "Tougher Than Tough" was featured in the video game Scarface: The World is Yours.

Morgan continued to perform occasionally at ska revival shows across the world, often backed by the guitarist Lynn Taitt until the latter's death in 2010. He retired from the music industry because of illness in the 2010s, but returned in 2016 to collaborate with Kirk Diamond on a remake of Morgan's song 1960s "Conqueror".

Morgan headlined the Supernova International Ska Festival, in Fredericksburg, Virginia from 27 to 28 May 2017.

== Discography ==
=== Albums ===
- Seven Letters (1969)
- Derrick Morgan in London (1969)
- Moon Hop (1970)
- Feel So Good (1975) (featuring Hortense Ellis)
- People's Decision (1977)
- Still in Love (1977) (also featuring Hortense Ellis)
- Sunset at Moonlight City
- Love City
- The Legend of Derrick Morgan (1980)
- I Am the Ruler (1992) – Trojan Records
- Tougher Than Tough (Rudie in Court) (1992)
- The Conquering Ruler (and the Sensational Yebo) (1994) – Pork Pie Records
- Ska Man Classics (1995)
- Ska Man Classics (1997)
- 21 Hits Salute (1997)
- Meets the High Notes Live (2003)
- Moon Hop: Best of the Early Years 1960–69 (2003)
- Derrick:Top the Top (2003)
- Derrick Meets the High Notes (2004)
- Shake A Leg (2014)
- Storybook Revisited (2019)

=== Singles ===
Morgan released nearly 200 singles in the UK, and more than 250 in Jamaica. These include:

- "The Hop" / "Tell It To Me", 7-inch: Island WI 006, UK, 1962
- "Forward March" / "Please Don't Talk About Me", 7-inch: Island WI 011, UK, 1962
- "See The Blind" / "Cherry Home", 7-inch: Island WI 013, UK, 1962
- "I Am The Ruler" / "I Mean It" Pyramid 1968
- "No Dice" / "I Mean It" Pyramid 1968
- "Fat Man" / "South Parkway Rock" Trojan TR 626 UK, 1968

Singles on Crab Records

- "Moon Hop" – 1969 – UK No. 49* "River to the Bank" / "Reggae Limbo", 7-inch (B side – Peter King)
- "Seven Letters" / "Lonely Heartaches", 7-inch (B side – The Tartons)
- "The First Taste of Love" / "Dance All Night", 7-inch
- "Don't Play That Song" / "How Can I Forget You", 7-inch
- "Mek It Tan Deh" / "Gimme Back", 7-inch
- "Send Me Some Loving" / "Come What May", 7-inch
- "Hard Time" / "Death Rides A Horse", 7-inch (B Side – Roy Richards)
- "Man Pon Moon" / "What A Thing", 7-inch
- "Moon Hop" / "Harris Wheel", 7-inch (B Side – Reggaeites)
- "A Night at the Hop" / "Telephone", 7-inch
- "Oh Baby" / The Rat", 7-inch (B Side – The Thunderbirds)
- "Need To Belong" / "Let's Have Some Fun", 7-inch (with Jennifer Jones)
- "I Wish I Was An Apple" / "The Story", 7-inch
- "Take A Letter Maria" / "Just A Little Loving", 7-inch (with Owen Gray)
- "Rocking Good Way" / "Wipe These Tears", 7-inch (with Jennifer Jones)
- "My Dickie" / "Brixton Hop", 7-inch
- "I Can't Stand It No Longer" / "Beyond The Wall", 7-inch
- "Endlessly" / "Who's Making Love", 7-inch
- "Hurt Me" / "Julia", 7-inch
- "Searching So Long" / "Drums of Passion", 7-inch

== See also ==
- Reggae genres
- List of ska musicians
- List of reggae musicians
