= Lynn Taitt =

Jamaican guitarist (1934–2010)

- Born: Nerlynn Taitt; 22 June 1934; San Fernando, Trinidad and Tobago
- Died: 20 January 2010 (aged 75) Montreal, Quebec, Canada
- Genres: Ska, rocksteady, reggae
- Occupation: Guitarist
- Instruments: Guitar, Bass, Steelpan
- Years active: Early 1960s – 2006

Nerlynn Taitt (22 June 1934 – 20 January 2010) was a guitarist born in San Fernando, Trinidad and Tobago, who later moved to Jamaica and became a pioneer of rocksteady music.

== Biography ==
Born Nerlynn Taitt, in San Fernando, Trinidad, he got his start as a musician playing in local steelpan bands, before taking up the guitar aged 14. He formed his own band, which was booked by Byron Lee to perform at the 1962 independence celebrations in Jamaica. Taitt decided to stay in Jamaica, living in Kingston, and played in a number of bands including The Sheiks, The Cavaliers, and The Comets, and worked with Baba Brooks, The Skatalites and Tommy McCook and the Supersonics. The most successful of his groups was The Jets, formed in 1966 and which included Hux Brown, Headley Bennett, Hopeton Lewis, Gladstone Anderson, and Winston Wright. Taitt's guitar style was inventive and unconventional, with a sharp percussive sound that accented the rocksteady beat. Lynn Taitt and the Jets played on hundreds of recording sessions for Jamaican producers such as Bunny Lee, Duke Reid, Joe Gibbs, Coxsone Dodd, and Sonia Pottinger, often performing up to five sessions a day. Their recording of "Take It Easy" was one of the first rocksteady singles and it reached number one in the Jamaican singles chart.

Taitt's contribution to Jamaican popular music includes his role as arranger and session leader for many of the recordings that he appeared on. He has been credited as having created the first rocksteady bassline, on the song "Take It Easy" by Hopeton Lewis. Various other Jamaican recordings have been cited as the "first" rocksteady release such as Alton Ellis & the Flames' "Girl I've Got a Date", and the Derrick Morgan rude boy anthem "Tougher Than Tough" with Lynn Taitt playing guitar on all three.

Taitt emigrated to Toronto, Ontario, Canada in August 1968, to take up the position of arranger for the house band at the West Indian Federated Club. Although he left Jamaica just before the rise of reggae, his playing was a strong influence on musicians such as Hux Brown who adapted Taitt's approach to the newer reggae style. Taitt's work can be heard on various 1960s recordings by Derrick Morgan, Desmond Dekker, Lee Perry, Ken Boothe, Bob Marley and Joe Higgs, among others. He recorded with Johnny Nash on some of the latter's international hits, including "Cupid" and "Hold Me Tight".

Taitt remained active as a musician in Montreal, having recorded with such acts as The Kingpins ("Let's Go To Work" CD 1999) as well as performing live with the Montreal Ska All Stars and at the Montreal International Jazz Festival with The Jets (2002) and the Fabulous LoLo sings Rocksteady (2006).

He was the subject of the 2006 documentary Lynn Taitt: Rocksteady, directed by Generoso Fierro, and another titled Ruff 'n' Tuff.

Taitt died on 20 January 2010 after a long battle with cancer. His death was recorded in Montreal, Quebec, Canada, at the age of 75.

== Discography ==
- Glad Sounds (1968), Bigshot (Gladdy with Lynn Taitt & the Jets)
- Rock Steady: Greatest Hits (1968), Merritone (Lynn Taitt & the Jets)
- Hold Me Tight: Anthology 65-73 (2005), Trojan
