= The Lee Thompson Ska Orchestra =

British band

The Lee Thompson Ska Orchestra are a British band formed in 2011 by Madness' saxophonist Lee Thompson. The band consists of an ever-shifting line-up of ska and reggae-oriented musicians playing classic ska cover versions. Their debut studio album was released in 2013.

== Formation ==
The band was formed in April 2011 to play a concert at The Regal in Oxford. After being asked to put together a group of musicians for the occasion, Thompson contacted Madness bassist Mark Bedford with the idea of putting together a group to play the old reggae and ska tunes that had inspired them to become musicians. Together, they assembled a group of previous collaborators, including Seamus Beaghan, who had played with Madness after keyboardist Mike Barson's departure; Terry Edwards, who, with Bedford created jazz duo BUtterfield 8; Louis Vause, a member of Thompson's other offshoot band Crunch, and Kevin Burdett, who had also played with Madness during Chris Foreman's hiatus from the band. The positive reception to the gig led to other performances, mostly around London and Brighton (including a support slot with Thompson and Bedford's primary band, Madness, at Butlin's, Minehead in Nov 2012), and an expansion of the line-up.

== Debut album: The Benevolence of Sister Mary Ignatius ==
In 2012, the band entered the studio to record their debut album. The record was made in Brighton at Iron Works studios, home of producer Mike Pelanconi, a.k.a. Prince Fatty, and a limited edition E.P., entitled You Lucky People, was released. It included three songs from the upcoming album and a live version of Jimmy Cliff's "Many Rivers to Cross" with backing singer Darren Fordham taking the lead vocal.

In May 2013, the first single from the new album was officially released to coincide with a small-scale nationwide tour. "Fu Man Chu", a cover of Desmond Dekker's mighty, mystic 1968 track, featured guest vocals from Bitty McLean, who also joined the band in the promo video, which was directed by music supremo, and one-time Madness manager, Dave Robinson and to perform the song on Later... with Jools Holland on 24 May. The debut album The Benevolence Of Sister Mary Ignatius, was released on CD and vinyl in June, featuring 12 tracks, hand picked by Thompson, from the group's, then, 17 song tour set. Following a positive reception to the LP and "Fu Man Chu" being given plenty of radio airtime, the orchestra toured the UK again in the Autumn of 2013, and once again featured at the House Of Fun weekender in Minehead. The band released their second single "Bangarang" which features vocals from Dawn Penn and accordion from Sharon Shannon on 26 May 2014, and Penn joined Thompson and backing singer Fordham on Jools Holland's Annual Hootenanny 2013 to perform the track.

On 29 June 2014 the Ska Orchestra performed on the West Holts Stage at the 2014 Glastonbury Festival.

=== Track listing ===
No.	Title	Writer(s)	Length
1.	"Guns Fever"	B Brooks	3:32
2.	"Bangarang"	S Cole/Lester Sterling	3:03
3.	"Midnight Rider"	Gregg Allman/R Payne	3:09
4.	"Fu Man Chu (ft. Bitty McLean)"	Desmond Dekker	3:22
5.	"Ali Baba"	John Holt	3:12
6.	"Mission Impossible"	Lalo Schifrin	2:58
7.	"Eastern Standard Time"	Sterling/Haynes/Brevett/Alphonso/Drummond/Mittoo/McCook/Knibb/Moore	4:31
8.	"Hot Reggae"	James Brown/Fred Wesley	4:00
9.	"Hello Josephine"	Fats Domino/Dave Bartholomew	3:40
10.	"Napoleon Solo"	L Taitt	2:38
11.	"Soon You'll Be Gone"	L Campbell/P James	2:39
12.	"Soul Serenade"	Luther Dixon/Curtis Ousley	4:55

== Second album: Bite the Bullet ==
The band released a second album Bite the Bullet in 2016.

=== Track listing ===
No.	Title	Writer(s)	Length
1.	"Bite The Bullet"	Mark Bedford	2:53
2.	"30-60-90"	Hodges/Grimes/Mitchell	2:24
3.	"Feel A Little Better"	Andy Neal	3:38
4.	"Cry To Me"	Bert Russell	3:06
5.	"I'll Be Back"	Lennon-McCartney	3:10
6.	"Hongry"	Lieber and Stoller	4:03
7.	"Western Standard Time"	Bob Dowell	2:36
8.	"I Am King"	Andy Neal	3:25
9.	"On Her Majesty's Secret Service"	John Barry, arranged Kevin Burdett	3:05
10.	"Step It Up Sister"	Mez Clough	3:13
11.	"Cuss Cuss"	Robinson/Johnson	3:56
12.	"Wickerman"	Lee Thompson/Louis Vause/Simon Charterton/Andy Neal	4:50
