= Jah Jerry Haynes =

Jerome "Jah Jerry" Haynes OD
- Born: 5 May 1927; Kingston, Jamaica
- Origin: Jamaica
- Died: 13 August 2007 (aged 80)
- Genres: Ska, rocksteady, reggae
- Instrument: Guitar

Jerome "Jah Jerry" Haynes OD (5 May 1927 – 13 August 2007) was a Jamaican guitarist and former member of The Skatalites.

Haynes was born in Trench Pen, presently known as Trench Town, the cultural capital of Jamaica, in 1927. He learned to play guitar from early years by his father and then by Ernest Ranglin. In 1949 he played with the Jocelyn Trott Orchestra in Montego Bay.

This prepared him for his sojourn into organized playing when he hit the hotel circuit playing with the Jocelyn Trott Orchestra in Montego Bay, in 1949. In the mid-1950s he freelanced with several other bands (including saxophonist Val Bennett's jazz band) until he joined the Arkland "Drumbago" Parks Studio Band. His upward "stumming" of the guitar became the signature style in the Boogie Shuffle/Ska

In 1959, Haynes worked with Prince Buster and played guitar in many sessions. In 1961, he was contracted exclusively to Coxsone Dodd, though he played for other producers, such as Duke Reid, King Edwards the Giant and Lyndon Pottinger. In 1964 he was one of The Skatalites founders and played with them until 1965. He was featured on Rico Rodriguez' That Man Is Forward album. Two years later, he joined the reformed Skatalites at the Reggae Sunsplash festival.

Haynes left the Skatalites in 1986 and lived in relative anonymity in Jones Town.

Haynes as a member of the Skatalites, was one of the first twelve inductees in the Jamaica Music Hall of Fame sponsored by the Jamaica Association of Vintage Artists and Affiliates in 2008. In 2010, he was honored by the Jamaican Government on National Heroes Day and was posthumously awarded the Order of Distinction at King's House for his contribution to the development of Jamaican music.

After the breakup of the Skatalites, Haynes continued working as a session musician. He played on the album, Top Secret, with Tommy McCook and Supersonics in the 1960s. He recorded on several hit songs in the 1970s, including "Black Star Liner" by Fred Locks, "The Gorgon" by Cornell Campbell and "Satta MassaGana" by the Abyssinians. When the original Skatalites reunited in the 1980s, minus Don Drummond (deceased 1969), Haynes played with the band at Reggae Sunsplash in Jamaica (1983) and in England (1984). They recorded three albums: Return of the Big Guns, Stretching Out and Rolling Steady. He also toured with the band in the United States and performed in New York at the Village Gate and SOB. While living in New York, he undertook session work for Sir Clement Dodd at his studio in Brooklyn. Haynes retired in 2000, his career spanning over 50 years. He played on a host of songs, such as "Be Still", "Oh Carolina", "Simmer Down", "Carry Go Bring Come", "One Love", "Humpty Dumpty", "Wash, Wash", "Blazing Fire", "Man in the Street", "Eastern Standard Time", and "Rough and Tough". He played on the first recording sessions for many Jamaican artists. These included Bob Marley and the Wailers, Jimmy Cliff, Desmond Dekker, Millie Small, Prince Buster, Alton Ellis, Delroy Wilson, Toots and the Maytals, Derrick Morgan, Justin Hinds and the Dominoes and Stranger Cole.
