= Guns of Navarone (song) =

1961 song by Dimitri Tiomkin and Paul Francis Webster

"Guns Of Navarone" is the theme music and song of the 1961 film of the same name. The music was written by Dimitri Tiomkin for the film, the soundtrack of which was released in 1961. A number of orchestral recordings have been released by various artists and appeared in various charts. Lyrics were added by Paul Francis Webster, and various vocal version have also been recorded including one by the Jamaican group the Skatalites whose single was released in 1965, and reached No. 35 on the UK Singles Chart in 1967.

== Background ==
The orchestral theme tune was played in the title sequence of the film The Guns of Navarone. The music was written by Dimitri Tiomkin and performed by Sinfonia of London. It was released in the soundtrack album for the film, which includes a vocal version by Mitch Miller Sing Along Chorus with lyrics by Paul Francis Webster. The film soundtrack was nominated for an Oscar, and won the Golden Globe Award for Best Original Score.

The theme tune has also been recorded by many other artists. Joe Reisman's version reached No 74 on Billboard Hot 100 in 1961. Different versions were released in France, including an orchestral version by Franck Pourcel and vocal versions by John William and Les Compagnons de la Chanson, which reached No. 3 in France, and No. 9 in Belgium.

== The Skatalites version ==
"Guns of Navarone"

Single by The Skatalites
- B-side: "Marcus Garvey"
- Released: 1965
- Genre: Ska
- Label: Muzik City (Jamaica), Island (UK)
- Songwriters: Dimitri Tiomkin, Paul Webster
- Producer: Coxsone Dodd

The Jamaican group the Skatalites recorded a version in 1965. AllMusic describes their recording as a masterpiece of the ska genre with its feeling of optimism with a "jubilant harmonic horn chorus". The vocalist is Roland Alphonso, with Lee "Scratch" Perry who provided various shouts on the track. The rhythm section of drummer Lloyd Knibb and bassist, Lloyd Brevett provided sharp rim shots and a "thumping bass".

Originally released in Jamaica on Coxsone Dodd's Muzik City label in 1965 under Alphonso's name, it was re-released the same year in the UK on Island using a slightly shorter edit. However, it did not appear in the UK charts until 1967, making number 36 in the spring of that year and staying on the charts for six weeks. It was The Skatalites' only top 40 hit in the UK.

== The Specials version ==
The song was again a hit when included on the UK Chart-topping The Special A.K.A. Live! EP by The Specials in 1980. The Specials version was a mostly instrumental version featuring scat-like toasting by Neville Staple and trombone by veteran ska musician Rico Rodriguez.
