= Doug Munro (musician) =

American jazz musician

Doug Munro (born July 9, 1953) is an American musician, arranger, producer, composer, author, and educator specializing in jazz, bebop, Brazilian jazz, jazz fusion, and gypsy swing. Since 1986 he has released over fifteen albums as a band leader and has appeared on over 75 recordings as a guitarist, sideman, producer, and arranger. He has been nominated for two Grammy Awards and was the recipient of two NAIRD Awards by the American Association of Independent Music.

In 1993 Munro founded the Purchase College Jazz Studies program and served as director from 1993 to 2002. He is on a faculty member and director emeritus of the Jazz Studies program at the Conservatory of Music at Purchase College. He has written four books on jazz guitar improvisation techniques for Alfred Music, including Swing to Bebop.

His preferred guitars are the Gibson ES175 Herb Ellis model, Godin Multiac Nylon Duet, Dell'Arte Legend 503, Martin D-35, and the Fender Telecaster.

== Early life ==
Douglas Anthony Munro was born July 9, 1953, in Yonkers, New York. He started his musical studies at age seven, taking drum lessons. By age fourteen, he was playing dances in Yonkers and New York City. At age 20, Munro broke his back in a gymnastics accident, which ended his career as a drummer. in 1977 at age 24, he underwent a successful back surgery, after which he began playing guitar as a way to pass the time during recovery.

== Career as a guitarist ==
After his recovery from spinal surgery, became a guitarist, performing locally and teaching guitar lessons. In 1986 he released the LP Courageous Cats. The album included Marshall Toppo on bass and John Jones III on drums. In the late 1980s Munro met record producer Joe Ferry, and the two would have a professional relationship for over 25 years.

In 1990 Joe Ferry introduced Munro to David Drozen, owner of Optimism Records. Optimism released Munro's album When Dolphins Fly, which was recorded with Bob Berg, Charles Blenzig, Joe Bonadio, Will Lee, Al Orlo, Ken Ross, and Marshall Toppo. Based on the success of the album, Munro received a contract to record a second album, Autumn in Blues, with Jeff Andrews, Rob Aries, Charles Blenzig, Joe Bonadio, Tony Cimorosi, Alex Foster, Adam Nussbaum, Lew Soloff, and Marshall Toppo. Optimism went out of business before releasing the album, resulting in a legal dispute over the master recordings. The album was released in 1993 by the Chase Music Group. In 1995 Munro returned to his trio roots with the album Blue Lady. The album featured Will Lee and Will Calhoun.

Munro divided his career into arranging, performing, teaching, and producing with friend and collaborator Joe Ferry. In 1999 he taught in a study abroad program sponsored by Purchase College. in Burgos, Spain. He performed with flamenco guitarist Mariano Mangas. They toured Europe and recorded the album Jazz/Flamenco Guitars on the Purchase College label.

In 2000 Munro recorded the first of two albums with his organ group II-V-I. The first album, Blueness, was recorded with Jerry Z, Mike Thompson, Alana Alexander, and Ken Gioffre. The second, Up Against It, featured Jerry Z and Jason Anderson. In 2004 he started a series of four Boogaloo recordings for Scufflin' Records. The first, Boogaloo to Beck featured Lonnie Smith, David "Fathead" Newman, and Lafrae Olivia Sci.

In 2004 and 2007, respectively, Munro released two Brazilian jazz albums with his group Big Bossa Nova. The first, Big Boss Bossa Nova, featured Ray Vega, Javon Jackson; Richie Morales, and Michael Goetz. Big Boss Bossa Nova 2.0 featured Michael Goetz, Jason Devlin, and Jason Anderson. These would be the last two recordings Munro would do for Chase Music Group.

In 2010, following the appearance of Napster and the easy accessibility of recorded music, he formed his record label GotMusic. In 2010 he released Alone But Not Alone Vol. 1, an album of a solo guitar that used loops. During the next year, he released A Very Gypsy Christmas with his gypsy swing group La Pompe Attack featuring Cyrille Aimée, Howie Bujese, Michael Goetz, Ken Peplowski, and Ernesto Pugliese.

In 2014 he released the enhanced DVD Loop-Mania!, which included six original compositions performed and filmed live using loops. It also included a section where he breaks down what he is playing and how he is using the technology on each song. There are downloadable mp3's of the music and downloadable .pdf files of the charts for each song.

The fourth album on GotMusic was Doug Munro and La Pompe Attack: The Harry Warren Songbook. This is a sixteen-track tribute Munro's great uncle, Harry Warren. There are fourteen compositions by Warren and two by Munro. The album was recorded with Howard Alden, Vic Juris, Vinny Raniolo, Ted Gottsegen, Ernesto Pugliese, Andrei Matorin, Howie Bujese, Matt Dwonszyk, and Michael Goetz.

La Pompe Attack's third recording is Putt Lake Toodleloo (Got Music Records, GMR-1005, copyright 2022). It contains 14 tracks, featuring Doug Munro on guitar and vocal, saxophonist Albert Rivera, guitarists Ben Wood, Ernie Pugliese, Ted Gottsegen, Vinny Raniolo, bassist Michael Goetz, and drummers Ian Carroll, and Jon Doty.

== Career as arranger and producer ==
In 1991 Munro began arranging and producing with Joe Ferry. Ferry and Munro's first album was We Remember Pastorius, a tribute to jazz bassist Jaco Pastorius. Musicians on the album included Glenn Alexander, Rob Aries, Charles Blenzig, Andy Bloch, Joe Bonadio, Chris Botti, Randy Brecker, Hiram Bullock, Joey Calderazzo, Tommy Cosgrove, Kenwood Dennard, Dr. John, Mark Egan, Alex Foster, Eddie Gómez, Scott Healy, Anthony Jackson, Will Lee, George Mraz, Adam Nussbaum, and Dave Weckl.

In 1992 Munro co-produced and arranged a series of recordings for Shanachie Records called The Soul of R&B (Vol 1, 2, 3). The series culminated in a live album and film recorded at the Lonestar Roadhouse in New York City. Musicians on the album included Cissy Houston, Chuck Jackson, Lani Groves, Johnny Kemp, Billy Vera, Cornell Dupree, Will Lee, Richard Tee, Dave Weckl, and the Uptown Horns.

In 1993 Munro and Ferry did two more tribute albums for Shanachie, People Get Ready: A Tribute to Curtis Mayfield and Back to the Streets: Celebrating the Music of Don Covay.

From 1993 to 1995 Munro continued to work with Joe Ferry as co-producer and arranger for Bluesiana Hot Sauce, and Bluesiana Hurricane which was recorded with Ray Anderson, Joe Bonadio, Michael Brecker, Will Calhoun, Eddie Gómez, Paul Griffin, Chuck St. Troy, Toots Thielemans, and Allen Toussaint. The Bluesiana recordings were the last recordings co-produced and arranged by the Munro/Ferry duo and the last for Shanachie.

In 1994 Munro joined the ska band The Skatalites as co-producer and arranger for 1994's Hi-Bop Ska and 1996's Greetings from Skamania. The albums were produced by Ferry and recorded by the original Skatalites, Lloyd Brevett, Lloyd Knibb, and Tommy McCook, with guest appearances by Nathan Breedlove, Prince Buster, Devon James, David Murray, Bill Smith, Steve Turre, and Bobby Watson. Both albums received Grammy nominations. Munro and Ferry co-wrote the song "Skalloween" from Greetings from Skamania.

In 1997 Munro added orchestrations to the original motion picture soundtrack for the Muhammad Ali documentary When We Were Kings which won the Academy Award for Best Documentary Film.

In 2002 he started a nearly ten-year collaboration with Vitamin Records. The year also marked the start of a collaboration with producer and engineer Eric Helmuth. They worked on over 40 recording albums. Munro wrote string arrangements for over 300 songs on 34 different recordings for Vitamin Record's String Quartet Tribute albums. The first album was a tribute to Pink Floyd, the last (34th) was a tribute to Star Wars. The prominent featured players were Dave Keen, Deborah Assael-Migliori, and Michael Goetz (bass). Munro wrote compositions for the recordings, sometimes collaborating with Joe Ferry.

Since 2010 Munro has done arranging for Vitamin Records. He has also produced lessons for Just Jazz Guitar, Premier Guitar, and TrueFire.com.

== Author and educator ==
Munro founded the jazz studies program in the Conservatory of Music at Purchase College in 1993, and served as the director of the program from 1993 to 2002. He retired in 2019 as professor emeritus and director emeritus of the Jazz Studies program at the Conservatory of Music at Purchase College.

In addition to his career as a musician and educator, Munro has authored four books about jazz guitar technique, published by Alfred Music and he is the producer and director of an interactive guitar instructional DVD entitled Loop-Mania!

Munro has published articles for Premier Guitar.

== Bibliography ==
1. The 21st Century Pro Method: Jazz Guitar – Swing to Bebop
2. The 21st Century Pro Method: Jazz Guitar – Bebop and Beyond
3. The 21st Century Pro Method: Jazz Guitar – Organ-Trio Blues
4. The Total Latin Guitarist: A Fun and Comprehensive Overview of Latin Guitar Playing

== Discography ==
=== As leader ===
- Courageous Cats (Novus, 1986)
- When Dolphins Fly (Optimism, 1990)
- Autumn In Blue (CMG Records, 1993)
- The Blue Lady (Chase Music, 1995)
- Blueness (CMG, 2000)
- Jazz Flamenco Guitars (Purchase, 2001)
- Up Against It (Chase Music, 2002)
- Boogaloo To Beck (Scufflin' Records, 2003)
- Boogaloo To Beastie Boys (Scufflin' Records, 2004)
- Big Boss Bossa Nova (CMG Records 2004)
- Big Boss Bossa Nova 2.0 (CMG, 2007)
- Boogaloo To Kanye West (Scufflin' Records, 2010)
- Boogaloo To Eminem (Scufflin' Records, 2010)
- Alone But Not Alone (GotMusic Records 2010)
- A Very Gypsy Christmas (GotMusic, 2011)
- Loop-Mania (GotMusic Records, 2014)
- The Harry Warren Songbook (GotMusic, 2017)
