= Lloyd Knibb =

Jamaican drummer (1931–2011)

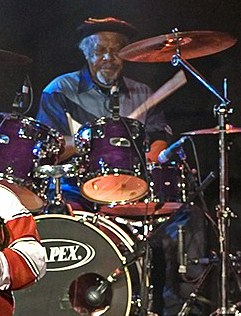
- A Concert of the legendary band "The Skatalites in Granada, Spain

Background information
- Born: 8 March 1931
- Origin: Kingston, Jamaica
- Died: 12 May 2011 (aged 80) Harbour View, Jamaica
- Genres: Ska, reggae, rocksteady
- Instrument: Drums
- Years active: 1945-2011
- Labels: Studio One, Treasure Isle, Top Hat

Lloyd Knibb OD (8 March 1931 – 12 May 2011) was a Jamaican drummer who is considered Jamaica's most important and influential modern drummer. A master percussionist, he contributed to every style of this nation's popular and not so popular musical forms, including jazz, mento, burru, nyabinghi, rock steady and, by extension, reggae. He is most well known for his contribution to the development of the rhythm of the ska. He played for The Skatalites (in the 1960s up to his death), and for Tommy McCook & The Supersonics. Knibb recorded for the producers Lloyd "Matador" Daley and Duke Reid.

== Biography ==
Born in Kingston, Jamaica in 1931, Knibb, grew up on Bond Street, close to where a local band rehearsed, and he made his own drum kit from a wooden box and paint cans to practice the sounds that he had heard. Like a lot of musicians in the 1940s, he honed his craft in jazz bands. His first professional engagement was with the Val Bennett band, with whom he played for six years. He also played with Count Ossie's group, adding burru and nyabinghi to his repertoire, and he regularly accompanied Rastafarian leader Sam Brown at meetings. It was with Eric Dean's band where he gained the technical skills to play many styles. Dean's set list included the big band music of Glenn Miller as well as the popular dances of the day: rhumba, cha-cha-cha and bolero, and his tenure in the band coincided with future major figures in ska such as Tommy McCook, Baba Brooks, and Lloyd Brevett. Knibb's technical proficiency and wide knowledge of styles soon led to him being featured on the recordings of Coxsone Dodd, Prince Buster, Sonia Pottinger and Duke Reid, playing an instrumental part in the development of ska.

Knibb gained his widest audience, however, as the drummer for The Skatalites. They recorded for the Treasure Isle (Duke Reid), Studio One (Clement Dodd) and Top Hat (Phillip Yap) labels, releasing ska music in the 1960s to an audience that responded to a rhythm that was uniquely Jamaican. Knibb, along with the other original Skatalites members, reformed to play the Reggae Sunsplash concert in Montego Bay, Jamaica in July 1983. The success of the reunion led to the reformation of The Skatalites as a full-time touring band, of which Knibb remained a member until his death in 2011. He played his last show in Peru on 23 April 2011 with local band Vieja Skina as the opening act.

In his later years, Knibb resided in Hull, Massachusetts with his longtime friend and fellow musician, John, and his wife, Adele. His son Dion plays in the Boston-based ska band Dion Knibb & The Agitators.

Knibb's contribution to Jamaican music was recognized by the Prime Minister's Award, the Order of Distinction (Officer Class), the Silver Musgrave Medal, and induction into the Jamaican Music Hall of Fame.

Knibb was taken ill while on tour in Brazil. On 12 May 2011, after being ill for some time with liver cancer and receiving treatment in the US, he was told by doctors that he only had days to live. Knibb traveled back to his home in St. Andrew, Jamaica, to be among his family and friends. Later that day, Knibb died aged 80.

His final studio recordings with The Skatalites, tracked at Don One Sound Studio in Brooklyn prior to his death, were released posthumously on the band's April 2012 studio album Walk With Me, which included his composition "King Solomon".
