= Stranger Cole =

Jamaican singer (1942–2026)

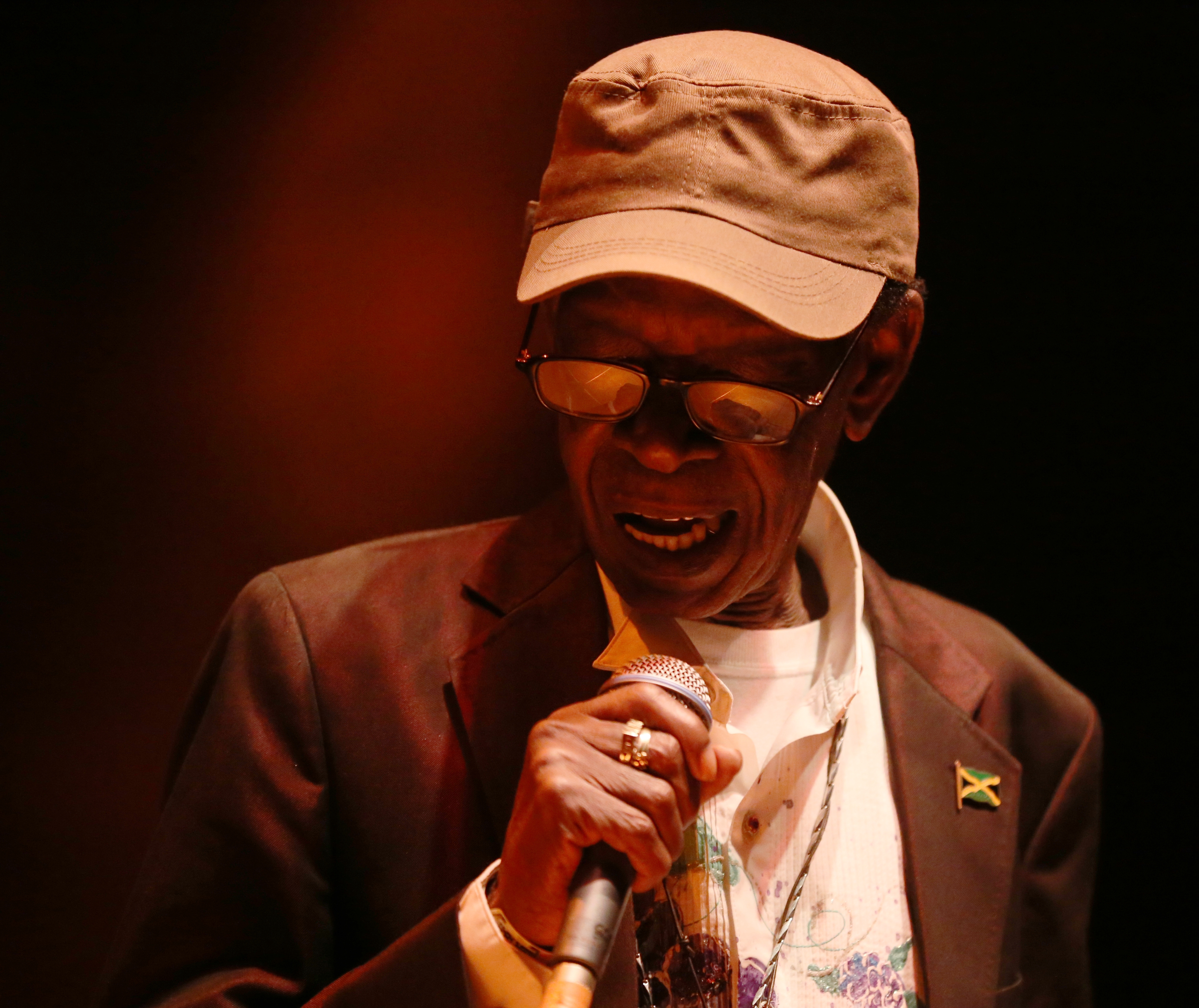
- Cole in 2013

Background information
- Also known as: StrangeJah Cole
- Born: Wilburn Theodore Cole; 26 June 1942; Kingston, Jamaica
- Died: 11 June 2026 (aged 83) Kingston, Jamaica
- Genres: Ska; rocksteady; reggae
- Occupation: Singer
- Years active: 1962–2026
- Labels: Trojan; Island

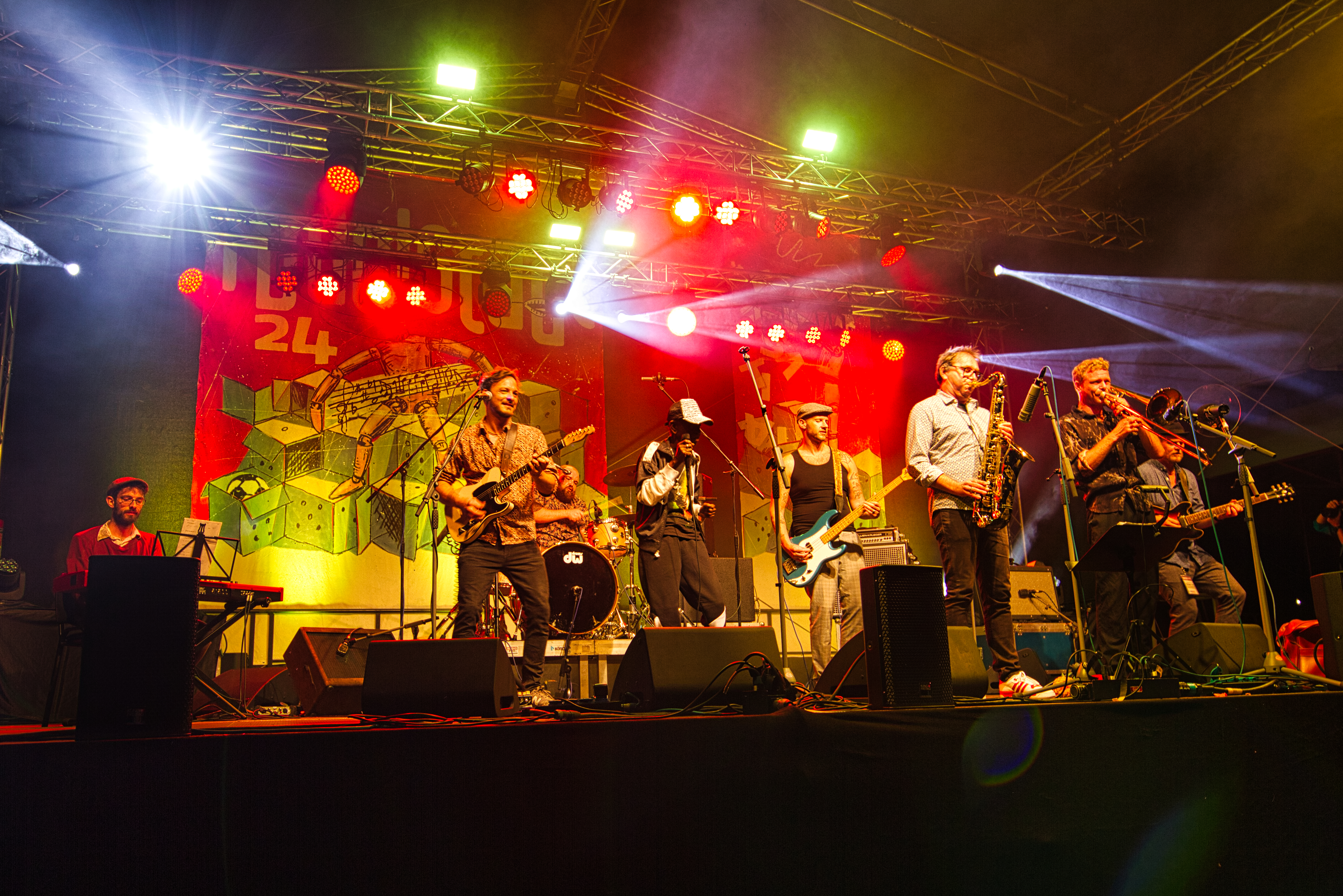
Stranger Cole & The Steadytones performing in Rudolstadt, 2024

Wilburn Theodore Cole (26 June 1942 – 11 June 2026), known professionally as Stranger Cole, was a Jamaican singer whose long recording career dates from the early days of ska in 1962 through to his death in 2026.

== Early life and career ==
Wilburn Theodore Cole was born in Kingston, Jamaica on 26 July 1942, and nicknamed "Stranger" by his family, as they considered that he did not resemble any member of his family.

Cole was initially successful as a songwriter, writing "In and out the Window", which was a hit for Eric "Monty" Morris. This success gave him the chance to make his recording debut in 1962, instantly finding success with singles such as "Rough and Tough" and "When You Call My Name" (a duet with Patsy Todd) for producer Arthur "Duke" Reid. Further success followed with singles for Reid through to the mid-1960s, and he also worked with other producers at this time, including Clement "Coxsone" Dodd (a duet with Ken Boothe on "Worlds Fair"), and Prince Buster. Further duets included recordings with Gladstone Anderson (on "Just Like a River") and Hortense Ellis, the tendency to record duets apparently due to his shyness when it came to singing alone. In the late 1960s and early 1970s he recorded with several producers, including Bunny Lee, Lee "Scratch" Perry, and Sonia Pottinger. These included further material with Todd as "Stranger & Patsy."

In 1971 Cole emigrated to the United Kingdom, where he toured extensively, and moved on again to Canada in 1973, settling in Toronto. He worked as a machinist in the Tonka Toy factory in Toronto and later opened a record store, the first Caribbean shop in Toronto's Kensington Market area. His first album, "Forward" in the Land of Sunshine, was released in 1976, with a handful of further albums released over the next ten years, mostly on his own label. In 2006, Cole released his first album in twenty years, Morning Train, a collaboration with Jah Shaka. Cole is featured in the 2009 documentary Rocksteady: The Roots of Reggae, in which he and other stars of the rocksteady era reunited to record a new album of the same name, released in August 2009. Cole's sons, Squiddly and Marcus, followed him into a music career: Squiddly working as a drummer for artists including Ziggy Marley and Mutabaruka; and Marcus Cole (aka KxritoXisen) producing music for his father.

== "Bangarang" ==
Cole is credited with creating the first reggae song with his hit, "Bangarang". The song was recorded in 1968 at Duke Reid's Studio with sound engineer Bunny 'Striker' Lee where Cole performed the song with saxophonist Lester Sterling and keyboard player Lloyd Charmers.

== Death ==
Cole died at University Hospital of the West Indies in Kingston, on 11 June 2026, aged 83.

== Discography ==
=== Albums ===
- "Forward" in the Land of Sunshine (1976), Ron Lew
- The First Ten Years (1978), Various Artists, Camelot
- Capture Land (1978), with Chalawa, Green Weenie
- The Patriot (1982), Stranger Cole
- No More Fussing and Fighting (1986), Scorcher
- Dramatic (2003), Stranger Cole & King Banana
- Bangarang (the Best of) (2003), Trojan
- Morning Train (2006), Jah Shaka Music
- Fabulous Songs of Miss Sonia Pottinger Vol.1 (2008), Drum&Bass (Queen Patsy & Stranger Cole)
- Ska 1959 – 1969, Stranger Cole
- Hice Gold, Wacam
- Storybook Revisited, Stranger Cole ( 2019)

=== Singles ===
- "Rough and Tough" (1963), Blue Beat
- "Miss Dreamer" (1963), Blue Beat
- "Stranger at the Door" (1963), Island
- "Last Love" (1963), Island
- "We Are Rolling" (1963), Island
- "Morning Star" (1963), Island
- "Thick in Love" (1963), R&B (Stranger and Ken)
- "When You Call My Name" (1963), Blue Beat (Stranger & Patsy)
- "Senor & Senorita" (1963), Island (Stranger & Patsy)
- "Happy Go Lucky" (1964), Black Swan (B-side of Theo Beckford's "Take Your Time")
- "Uno Dos Tres" (1964), Black Swan
- "Summer Day" (1964), Black Swan
- "Boy Blue" (1964), Black Swan
- "Til My Dying Days" (1964), Island
- "Goodbye Peggy" (1964), Island
- "Out of Many" (1964), R&B
- "I Want to Go Home" (1964), Black Swan (Stranger & Ken)
- "Hey Little Girl" (1964), Black Swan (Stranger & Patsy)
- "Oh Oh I Need You" (1964), Island (Stranger & Patsy)
- "Tom Dick & Harry" (1964), Island (Stranger & Patsy)
- "Yeah Yeah Baby" (1964), Island (Stranger & Patsy)
- "Miss B" (1964), Island (Stranger & Patsy)
- "I'll Forgive You" (1964), R&B (Stranger & Patsy)
- "Millie Maw" (1963), Dutchess
- "Real Real" (1962), Dutchess
- "Love Thy Neighbour" (1965), Ska-Beat (B-side of Roland Alphonso's "Nuclear Weapon")
- "When the Party Is Over" (1965), Blue Beat
- "Koo Koo Doo" (1965), Island
- "Run Joe" (1965), Island
- "Pussy Cat" (1965), Island
- "Matilda" (1965), Blue Beat (B-side to Buster's All Stars' "Captain Burke")
- "Seven Days" (1965), Island (B-side to Baba Brooks' "Independent Ska" – Stranger & Claudette)
- "We Shall Overcome" (1966), Dr. Bird
- "Drop the Ratchet" (1966), Dr. Bird
- "Loving Wine" (1966), Dr. Bird (B-side of Tommy McCook's "Spanish Eyes" – Stranger & Hortense)
- "You Took My Love" (1967), Dr. Bird
- "Tell It To Me" (1967), Dr. Bird (Stranger & Patsy)
- "Down the Trainlines" (1967) Dr. Bird (Stranger & Patsy)
- "Jeboza Macoo" (1968), Island
- "Just Like a River" (1968), Amalgamated (Stranger Cole & Gladstone Anderson)
- "Seeing is Knowing" (1968), Amalgamated (Stranger & Gladdy)
- "Love Me Today" (1968), Island (Stranger & Gladdy)
- "(Over and) Over Again" (1968), Island (Stranger & Gladdy)
- "What Mama Na Want She Get" (1969), Amalgamated
- "Glad You're Living" (1969), Duke
- "Pretty Cottage" (1969), Escort
- "Leana Leana" (1969), Escort
- "Last Flight to Reggae City" (1969) Unity (Stranger Cole & Tommy McCook & the Supersonics)
- "When I Get My Freedom" (1969), Unity
- "If We Should Ever Meet" (1969), Unity (B-side of Lester Sterling's "Bangarang")
- "My Love" (1969), Escort (Stranger & Patsy)
- "Why Did You" (1969), Escort (Stranger & Patsy)
- "Give it To Me" (1969), Camel (B-side of Delroy Wilson's "Sad Mood")
- "You Should Never Have to Come" (1969), Crab (B-side of Ernest Wilson's "Freedom Train")
- "Tomorrow" (1970), Escort (B-side of Lloyd Clarke's "Chicken Thief")
- "Everyday Tomorrow" (1970), Camel
- "Loneliness" (1970), Escort
- "Little Things" (1970), Escort
- "Everything With You" (1970), Escort
- "Pussy" (1970), Escort
- "Lift Your Head Up High" (1970), Gas
- "Come Dance With Me" (1970), Pama
- "Crying Every Night" (1971), Camel
- "Tomorrow" (1971), Clandisc (Stranger & Gladdy)
- "My Application" (1971), Supreme (Stranger & Gladdy)
- "My Confession" (1972), Jackpot
- "The House Where Bombo Lives" (1972), Pama
- "Mail Man" (1972), Tropical
- "Bringing in the Sheaves" (1972), Green Door (Hortense Ellis & Stranger Cole)
- "Mocking Bird" (1973) Count Shelly (Stranger Cole & Hortense)
- "Time is Now" (19??), Wackie's (12")
- "No More Fussing and Fighting" (198?), Roots (12")
- "Don't Play" (2007), Soul of Anbessa (7")
- "Crown Me" (1964), Strange Jah (B-side of Baba Brooks Band's "Baba Brooks Special")
