= Michigan & Smiley =

Jamaican reggae/dancehall duo

Michigan and Smiley are a Jamaican reggae/dancehall duo consisting of Papa Michigan (born Anthony Fairclough) and General Smiley (born Erroll Bennett). They rose to popularity during the first wave of dancehall music in the late 1970s.

== Career ==
The duo of Michigan (Anthony Fairclough) and Smiley recorded at Clement "Coxsone" Dodd's Studio One in Jamaica, pressing their first number one hit single, "Rub a Dub Style", which featured their call and response style vocals, overdubbed on the Studio One riddim, "Vanity" (the instrumental alias given to Alton Ellis' Rocksteady classic, "I'm Just A Guy"). Their next single, perhaps a larger hit, "Nice Up the Dance" was a version of the quintessential Studio 1 rhythm, "Real Rock". These singles, with four other tracks, also versions of Studio One rhythms, were released as their first album, Nice Up the Dance. The names of these two singles were quickly incorporated into the lexicon of dancehall phraseology. Their call and response style was likewise influential on the future developments of the music, blending together straightforward singing styles and toasting. By 1982, they caught the attention of Henry "Junjo" Lawes, who recorded their biggest hit, "Diseases" over the "Mad Mad" riddim. This track was featured on their second LP, Downpression. They went on to cut an album for Channel One Records, Step by Step. The last of their hit records was "Sugar Daddy", pressed on RAS Records, which featured yet another reworking of "Mad Mad".

Michigan & Smiley recorded a version of Suzanne Vega's hit single "Tom's Diner" that is included on the compilation album Tom's Album. The duo continue to record and make appearances at festivals and have both released solo recordings. Papa Michigan released his EP, DJ Legend, in September 2014, which served as the forerunner to his album of the same name. The project—co-produced by Flash Hit Records, Manudigital, and his own Rashanco Music label—marked a throwback to his original foundation sound.

== Discography ==
=== Albums ===
- Rub a Dub Style (1980) Studio One
- Downpression (1982) Greensleeves
- Live at Reggae Sunsplash (1982) Trojan (with Eek-a-Mouse)
- Sugar Daddy (1983) RAS
- Back in the Biz (1991) VP
- Reality Must Rule Again (1992) VP
- Uptown/Downtown (1995) VP
