= Ball of Fire (album) =

Studio album by Skatalites
- Released: 1997 (UK); 1998 (US)
- Genre: Ska jazz
- Label: Island Jamaica Jazz

Skatalites chronology
Greetings from Skamania (1996)	Ball of Fire (1997)	Ska Titans: Laurel Aitken & the Skatalites (1999)

Ball of Fire is an album by the Jamaican band the Skatalites, released in 1998 in the United States. The band supported the album with a North American tour, including shows with several Hellcat bands.

== Production ==
The eight-piece Skatalites recorded Ball of Fire with four original members. The band reinterpreted some of their older instrumentals—which had been hits in the United Kingdom—stretching them out and giving them a jazzier sound, with longer guitar and horn solos. Ernest Ranglin played guitar on some of the tracks. The title track was written in the early 1960s.

== Critical reception ==
Professional ratings
Review scores
Source	Rating
AllMusic	4/5 stars
The Atlanta Journal-Constitution	B+
The Austin Chronicle	5/5 stars
The Indianapolis Star	3.5/4 stars
Los Angeles Daily News	3/4 stars
MusicHound World: The Essential Album Guide	3.5/5 stars
NME	8/10 stars
Rolling Stone	3.5/5 stars
(The New) Rolling Stone Album Guide	3/5 stars

The Austin Chronicle wrote that Ball of Fire "is nothing less than a live, in-the-studio recording with a sparkling sound... Here is one of the greatest 'groove' bands of all time at the top of their form." The Independent stated: "Ultimately, you're left with the feeling that it's being done for their benefit, rather than yours. That's jazz, I guess." The Atlanta Journal-Constitution determined that Ranglin "contributes lightning quick bebop lines, taking the music beyond its structural limitations."

Rolling Stone deemed the album "a casual, disarmingly sweet trip through the band's storied songbook." The Los Angeles Daily News opined that "the current lineup recaptures the original energy and jazz roots." The Indianapolis Star determined that "enough cannot be said about the strong, smooth solos on trumpet (Nathan Breedlove) and alto sax (Lester Sterling)."

AllMusic wrote that the album "finds a reunited Skatalites reworking their greatest hits, playing long, extended passages that allow the band to demonstrate their substantial instrumental abilities."

== Track listing ==
No.	Title	Length
1.	"James Bond Theme"
2.	"Latin Goes Ska"
3.	"Confucious"
4.	"Occupation"
5.	"Rock Fort Rock"
6.	"Eastern Standard Time"
7.	"Ball of Fire"
8.	"Swing Easy"
9.	"Ringo"
10.	"Freedom Sound"

== Personnel ==
- Lloyd Brevett – Electric upright bass
- Lloyd Knibb – Drums
- Devon James – Guitar
- Lester Sterling – Alto saxophone
- Roland Alphonso – Tenor saxophone
- Will Clark – Trombone
- Nathan Breedlove – Trumpet
- Bill Smith – Piano, organ
- with Special Guest Ernest Ranglin – Guitar
- Produced by Nathan Breedlove, Bill Smith, Shay & the Skatalites
- Engineered by Danny Kadar
- Assistant engineer – Jen Wyler
- Mastered by John Dent at Loud Mastering
- Designed by Michael + K8 @Intro
- Liner notes by Jon Preston
