= The Melodians =

Jamaican rocksteady band

- Origin: Kingston, Jamaica
- Genres: Ska, rocksteady, reggae
- Years active: 1963–1973 (and intermittently since)
- Labels: Studio One, Treasure Isle, Beverley's
- Members: Taurus Alphonso; Winston Dias
- Past members: Tony Brevett; Brent Dowe; Trevor McNaughton; Bramwell Brown; Renford Cogle; Vin
- Website: www.themelodians.net

The Melodians are a rocksteady band formed in the Greenwich Town area of Kingston, Jamaica, in 1963, by Tony Brevett (born 1949, nephew of The Skatalites bassist, Lloyd Brevett), Brent Dowe and Trevor McNaughton. Renford Cogle assisted with writing and arranging material.

== Career ==
Trevor McNaughton had the idea of putting a group together and contacted 14-year-old Tony Brevett, who had already had success in local talent shows. Brevett recruited his friend Brent Dowe and the group was formed, with Brevett taking on lead vocal duties. Bramwell Brown and Renford Cogle also had short stints in the group in its early days, and Cogle became one of the group's main songwriters.

The group recorded some material with Prince Buster before Ken Boothe introduced them to Coxsone Dodd's Studio One label where in 1966 they recorded "Lay It On" (one of the first records to reflect the shift from ska to rocksteady), "Meet Me", "I Should Have Made It Up" and "Let's Join Hands (Together)". Lead vocal duties were now shared between Brevett and Dowe. From 1967 to 1968 they had a number of hits on Duke Reid's Treasure Isle label, including "You Have Caught Me", "Expo 67", "I'll Get Along Without You", and "You Don't Need Me". After recording "Swing and Dine" for record producer Sonia Pottinger, they had further hits with "Little Nut Tree" before recording their biggest hit, "Rivers of Babylon" for Leslie Kong. This song became an anthem of the Rastafarian movement, and was featured on the soundtrack of the movie The Harder They Come. In the early 1970s Brevett also recorded as a solo artist, having his greatest success with "Don't Get Weary". After Kong's death in 1971, they recorded for Lee Perry and Byron Lee's Dynamic Studios. In 1973, Brent Dowe left the group for a solo career. The group reformed briefly a few years later, and again in the early 1980s.

The Melodians regrouped again in the 1990s as part of the roots revival. In 1992 they recorded "Song of Love", which was issued on the Tappa Zukie label. Throughout the later 1990s they continued touring internationally, including appearing at the Sierra Nevada World Music Festival in California in 2002. In 2005 The Melodians embarked on a West Coast tour.

The death of Tony Brevett in 2013 left McNaughton as the only surviving original member. McNaughton toured as a solo artist in 2014 and subsequently recruited Taurus Alphonso (formerly of the Mellow Tones) and Winston Dias (formerly of The Movers) to form a new Melodians line-up. As of February 2015, the group were recording a new album in Florida with producer Willie Lindo. The Return of the Melodians was released in May 2017 and went on to reach no. 19 on the Billboard Reggae Albums chart.

In February 2017, the Melodians received an 'Iconic Award' from the Jamaica Reggae Industry Association (JaRIA).

== Deaths ==
=== Brent Dowe ===
On the evening of 29 January 2006, after a rehearsal in preparation for a performance to take place the following weekend at the Jamaican Prime Minister’s residence, Brent Dowe suffered a fatal heart attack at the age of 59. The remaining original members Tony Brevett and Trevor McNaughton continued touring in Europe and the U.S. backed by the Yellow Wall Dub Squad.

=== Tony Brevett ===
On 25 October 2013 Tony Brevett died from cancer after being admitted to hospital in Miami in August. He was 64 years old.

=== Trevor McNaughton ===
McNaughton, the last surviving original member of the group, died on 20 November 2018 at the Kendrick Rehabilitation Hospital in Hollywood, Florida, from respiratory failure. He was 77, and had been admitted to hospital the previous month.

== Partial discography ==
=== Albums ===
- Rivers of Babylon (1970), Trojan
- Sweet Sensation (1976), Trojan
- Sweet Sensation: The Original Reggae Hit Sound (1980), Island
- Irie Feelings (1983), Ras
- Premeditation (1986), Skynote
- The Return of the Melodians (2017), TWT Music

=== Compilation albums ===
- Swing and Dine (1993), Heartbeat
- Rivers of Babylon (1997), Trojan
- Sweet Sensation: The Best of the Melodians (2003), Trojan

=== Compilation appearances ===
- The Rough Guide to Reggae (1997), World Music Network

== See also ==
- Crab Records
