= The Liquidator (instrumental) =

"Liquidator"

Single by The Harry J Allstars
- B-side: "La La Always Stay – Glen and Dave"
- Released: 1969
- Genre: Ska, reggae
- Label: Harry J
- Songwriter: Harry Johnson
- Producer: Harry Johnson

Audio
- "Liquidator" on YouTube

"Liquidator" is a reggae instrumental by Jamaican band Harry J Allstars. It reached number nine on the UK Singles Chart in November 1969 and was certified silver in the UK in April 2022.

== Background ==
Carlton "Carly" Barrett has said that the instrumental was originally for a song by Tony Scott, "What Am I to Do". Harry Johnson bought the rights from Scott, licensed the track to Trojan and credited it to the Harry J Allstars. But Alton Ellis has said that the core of the song was a lift from his rocksteady hit "Girl I've Got a Date".

Musicians involved in the recording included the core of the Hippy Boys: bassist 'Family Man' Aston Barrett, drummer Carlton Barrett and guitarist Alva Lewis. They later formed the core of the Upsetters and the Wailers. The organ was played by Winston Wright who, as a member of Tommy McCook's Supersonics, was acknowledged as Jamaica's master of the Hammond organ. Wright featured on other Harry Johnson hits, including the Beltones' "No More Heartaches" and on Boris Gardiner's "Elizabethan Reggae".

== Certifications ==
Region	Certification	Certified units/sales
United Kingdom (BPI)	Silver	200,000^{‡}
^{‡} Sales+streaming figures based on certification alone.

== Other versions ==
A variation was recorded featuring the sax of Val Bennett (entitled "Tons of Gold"), but the Hippy Boys' original instrumental had the most success.

The Staple Singers used the bass line and introduction from "Liquidator" for their 1972 hit "I'll Take You There".

The Specials covered "Liquidator" as part of the ska covers medley "Skinhead Symphony" on their live EP The Special A.K.A. Live! which reached number one on the UK Singles Chart in January 1980. The renewed interest in the song led to Trojan Records reissuing the Harry J Allstars version as a double A-side with the original version of another song featured in the medley, "Long Shot Kick De Bucket" by the Pioneers, in March 1980. The reissue reached number 42 on the UK Singles Chart.

The 1990s saw a version by youth group TCO titled "Big It Up" released on Virgin Records and was produced by Suggs from Madness. Contributors included K-Gee. It featured prominent reggae players with contributions from young north London rappers and singers. The record also contained interpolations from the Staple Singers' "I'll Take You There". The single featured a product tie-in with 7 Up and video game Cool Spot and was featured in the then current 7 Up television advertisement campaign.

== Use at football matches ==
"Liquidator" is a popular tune to play as UK football teams run out: Northampton Town, Chelsea, Wolverhampton Wanderers, West Bromwich Albion, and St Johnstone all have claims to have been the first club to use it.

Chelsea's claims to be first to play it are supported by the first paragraph of the liner notes for Liquidator – The Best of the Harry J All Stars, which says: "Way back in 1969, supporters of the Chelsea football team revered players such as Bonetti, Osgood and Hollins. The boys performed under the watchful eye of manager Dave Sexton to the tune of 'Liquidator'. The track is played by Chelsea before home games, whilst fans clap the players onto the pitch."

"Liquidator" was stopped on the 8 January 2004 at the home games of West Bromwich Albion and Wolves at the request of West Midlands Police due to some fans using the tune to chant abuse and obscenities about their rivals, although it was played by West Brom before the start of their match against Cardiff City towards the end of the 2013–14 season. As of 2024 the ban remains in force at Wolverhampton's ground, though it is now played at West Bromwich, and was played when the two teams played in the 2023–24 FA Cup fourth round match between the two sides at WBA's Hawthorns ground on 28 January 2024.

Yeovil Town adopted the song in 2003.

The track was played as part of the soundtrack to the football-themed film Fever Pitch.
