= Doris Darlington =

Jamaican sound-system operator (died 1998)

- Also known as: Nanny
- Born: Doris Albertha Darlington; Jamaica
- Died: 25 June 1998
- Genres: Reggae, Ska, Rocksteady
- Instruments: turntables, record producer
- Label: Studio One

Doris Albertha Darlington (died 25 June 1998) was a Jamaican Maroon who owned a food shop and later a liquor store in Kingston, Jamaica, in the 1950s and 1960s. This site provided the initial space for her son Coxsone Dodd to begin playing music for customers, a practice that eventually led to his founding Studio One and becoming one of the island's key musical forces. When her son was away buying records to play on the sound system, Darlington set up and ran the sound system herself, and thus can be named one of Jamaica's first sound system operators, and a force in the development of ska, rocksteady and reggae music. Darlington also ran a record store in Jamaica, was often present at Studio One recording studios and involved in producing music in the early 1960s.

Darlington was nicknamed "Nanny" after the famed female leader Nanny of the Maroons.

== Biography ==
Darlington was a descendant of the Jamaican Maroons, communities descended from escaped Africans who fought for and established free communities in the Jamaican interior. In the 1950s she owned a food shop whose customers were interested in hearing the latest R&B tunes from the US. Her son Clement "Coxsone" Dodd began to meet this need with a turntable, an amplified sound system and a collection of records, and eventually the space expanded into a bar with a canteen in the back at which Darlington would cook. However, whenever Dodd went on trips to purchase music, he would leave Nanny in charge of the show, running the technical and creative side of the Downbeat sound system. This made her "the first female sound system operator".

Dodd later said of her contribution to music that "She is the founding mother of everything, for without her nothing would’ve happened". Dodd also named one of his sublabels D. Darling after her. Darlington also ran the record store, Music Land, in Spanish Town, Jamaica. (Some sources describe her as running a record store called Muzik City, which is also associated with Coxsone Dodd).

== Production career ==
Darlington was often present at Studio One recording studio, and sometimes took an active role from at least 1961 to the early 1990s, when she was listed as producer on George Faith's 1992 album Just the Blues. The bulk of her credits are from the early 1960s, when she produced a small string of rocksteady, Jamaican rhythm and blues and jazz singles.
