= Johnny Moore (trumpeter) =

- Also known as: Dizzy
- Born: John Arlington Moore; 5 October 1938
- Origin: Kingston, Jamaica
- Died: 16 August 2008 (aged 69)
- Genres: Ska, Rocksteady, Reggae
- Instrument: Trumpet

John Arlington "Dizzy" Moore OD was a Jamaican trumpet player and founding member of pioneering Jamaican ska and reggae act The Skatalites.

== Biography ==
A friend of his attended the Alpha Boys School, which catered for wayward boys and was renowned for its strong musical programme, and impressed by his playing, Moore decided on a strategy of misbehaving to get sent there himself, which worked after (he later claimed) pulling "a couple of pranks" to show that he was "going haywire". While at the school he took up the trumpet and studied musical composition under bandleader Ruben Delgado. On leaving the school, he joined the army, playing in the Jamaica Military Band. He was dismissed from the army after three years on a charge of being "not amenable to military service". He then joined the Mapletoft Poulle Orchestra, and Eric Dean's band, but was thrown out for growing dreadlocks. He regularly visited the Rastafarian camp led by Count Ossie at Wareika Hill, and worked as a session musician in the early 1960s, and played in studio band The Cavaliers. Moore and other Cavaliers members Jackie Mittoo, Lloyd Brevett, and Lloyd Knibb then joined with Tommy McCook in the new band The Skatalites in 1964. When the Skatalites split into two bands in 1965, Moore joined the Soul Vendors, led by Roland Alphonso. The Skatalites reformed in 1983, with many of the original members, including Moore.

In October 2007, Moore was awarded the Order of Distinction in the Rank of Officer (OD) for pioneering work in popularising Jamaican music.

Moore died of colon cancer on 16 August 2008 at the age of 69.

== Discography ==
=== Solo ===
- Something Special, High Times
- Riot

=== with Bob Marley & The Wailers ===
- Wail'n Soul'm Singles Selecta

=== with Lee Perry ===
- Chicken Scratch
