= Harry J =

- Harry J

Background information
- Born: Harry Zephaniah Johnson; 6 July 1945; Westmoreland Parish, Jamaica
- Died: 3 April 2013 (aged 67) Savanna-la-Mar Hospital, Westmoreland Parish, Jamaica
- Genre: Reggae
- Occupation: Record producer
- Instrument: Bass
- Years active: 1968–1995; 2002–2013
- Labels: Studio One, Harry J, Jaywax

Harry Zephaniah Johnson (6 July 1945 – 3 April 2013), known by the stage name Harry J, was a Jamaican reggae record producer.

== Biography ==
Born in Westmoreland Parish, Jamaica in 1945, Johnson started to play music with the Virtues as a bass player before moving into management of the group. When the band split up, he focused on working as an insurance salesman until 1968, when he produced the Beltones' local hit "No More Heartaches", one of the earliest reggae songs to be recorded. His agreement with Coxsone Dodd allowed him to use Studio One's facilities, where he produced the hit "Cuss Cuss" with singer Lloyd Robinson, which became one of the most covered riddims in Jamaica, with notable versions released by Horace Andy and Lloyd Barnes. Johnson also released music under a subsidiary label, Jaywax.

In October 1969, he met success in the UK with "The Liquidator" (number 9 on the UK Singles Chart), recorded with his session band, the Harry J All Stars. It was also a hit again in 1980, reaching number 42. This single became one of the anthems of the emerging skinhead youth subculture, together with other instrumental hits released in the UK through his own subdivision "Harry J" on Trojan Records, on a compilation album of the same name.

In the beginning of the 1970s, he enjoyed another big success with the vocal duo Bob and Marcia with the song "Young, Gifted and Black". His productions also included Jamaican hits with deejays like Winston Blake and Scotty among others, and many dub versions.

=== Harry J Studio ===
Johnson is mainly known for his Harry J Studio, where Bob Marley & the Wailers recorded some of their albums in the 1970s. The studio was also a 'must stop' hangout of many British and other musicians including the Rolling Stones, the Who, and Grace Jones. In addition, Chris Blackwell, founder of Island Records, could be found hanging out in the sound room prior to moving to England in the early 1970s.

In 1972, Harry Johnson sold his record shop and set up his own recording studio, "Harry J", on 10 Roosevelt Avenue, Uptown Kingston, where he employed Sid Bucknor and later Sylvan Morris as resident recording engineer. Harry J Studio soon became one of the most famous Jamaican studios after having recorded several Bob Marley & the Wailers albums from 1973 to 1976 before the Tuff Gong era, such as Rastaman Vibration and Catch a Fire.

Johnson's deal with Island Records led him to record artists such as Burning Spear and the Heptones. Throughout the 1970s and the 1980s, assisted by former Studio One sound engineer Sylvan Morris, he also recorded Ken Boothe, Augustus Pablo, the Cables and the American pop singer Johnny Nash, and produced albums by Beres Hammond's Zap Pow and Sheila Hylton. In 2000, after seven years of inactivity, Stephen Stewart, who worked in the early years alongside Sylvan Morris, refurbished, re-equipped and reopened Harry J Studio. Since then under the management of Stewart, the studio had seen the return of Burning Spear, Toots, Shaggy, Sly & Robbie, and newer projects of Shakira, Papa Sam/Kirk Franklyn, Luciano and Sizzla. The studio appeared in the 1978 film Rockers.

== Personal life ==
Johnson died on 3 April 2013 after a long battle with diabetes. He was 67 years old.

== Discography ==
=== Harry J Allstars ===
- The Liquidator – 1969 – Harry J/Trojan
- Liquidator: The Best of the Harry J Allstars – 2003 – Trojan
- Dubbing at Harry J's 1972–1975 – Jamaican Recordings

=== Compilations ===
- Various Artists – Reggae Movement – 1970 – Harry J/Trojan
- Various Artists – What Am I to Do – 1970 – Harry J/Trojan
- Various Artists – Reggay Roots – 1977 – Harry J
- Various Artists – Computer – 1985 – Sunset
- Various Artists – The Return of the Liquidator: 30 Skinhead Classics 1968–1970 – 1989 – Trojan (2 CD)

=== As a producer ===
- Sylvan Morris & Harry J – Cultural Dub – 1978 – Harry J
- Sylvan Morris – Jah Jah Dub – Roosevelt
- The Heptones – Book of Rules – 1973 – Jaywax
- The Heptones – Cool Rasta – 1976 – Trojan
- Leslie Butler – Ja-Gan – 1975 – Trojan
- Zap Pow – Revolution – 1976 – Trojan
- Lloyd Willis – Gits Plays Bob Marley's Greatest Hits – 1977 – Harry J
- The Melodians – Sweet Sensation – 1977 – Harry J
- Sheila Hilton – "Breakfast in Bed" – 1977– Harry J
- Dennis Brown – So Long Rastafari – 1979 – Harry J

== See also ==
- List of Jamaican record producers
