= Mystic Revealers =

Jamaican reggae band

- Origin: Jamaica
- Genres: Reggae
- Years active: 1977–present
- Label: VP Records
- Members: Billy "Mystic" Wilmot; Leroy "Lion" Edwards; Nicholas "Drummie" Henry; Steve Davis; Ika Wilmot

The Mystic Revealers are a reggae band formed in the late 1970s in the seaside town of Bull Bay east of Kingston, Jamaica. Originally, the band was known as just the Revealers, but when another group with that name popped up, it was decided the word "Mystic" would help convey their Rastafari-inspired message of truth, justice, honor and unity. The band's four founding members form the heart of the group and include Kingston-born vocalist, guitarist, and songwriter Billy "Mystic" Wilmot; former Jalan and Earth Disciples drummer and record producer Nicholas "Drummie" Henry, bass guitarist Leroy "Lion" Edwards and guitarist and vocalist Steve Davis. They draw upon Jamaica's rich, established reggae tradition of outspoken political awareness when writing and performing their original material.

== Career ==
The Mystic Revealers’ first recording, "Winner," was released on their own Negus Beat label in 1982. In 1985, the band scored their first hit with "Mash Down Apartheid." While it wasn't their first single, the track, produced by reggae pioneer and The Harder They Come star Jimmy Cliff for his Oneness record label, was the first to win the attention of Jamaica's demanding public, with its rallying cry against racist practices in South Africa. In an unusual move for a new act, the group donated proceeds from the sale of "Mash Up Apartheid" to the African National Congress.

At the time of the Mystic Revealers’ emergence, Jamaican music was moving away from roots reggae and live bands, and into the era of dancehall deejays and computerized production. Defying the trends of the day, the Mystic Revealers instead followed the path of Bob Marley and the Wailers and Third World, blending roots reggae and Rastafarian principles with rock, folk and pop. A 1988 appearance at Jamaica's world-famous Reggae Sunsplash helped spread the Mystic Revealers’ reputation further, leading to international tours in Japan, the U.K. and Europe.

In 1992, nearly 15 years after the band's formation, the Mystic Revealers released their debut album, Young Revolutionaries. By this time the band's membership had grown to include lead guitarist Rudolph "Pretty" Bonito, keyboardist/guitarist Winston "Metal" Stewart and percussionist William "Willigan" Cocking. Initially issued by the Sonic Sounds label in Jamaica, the album was picked up for US release by Gong Sounds. The album would later be issued by several different US labels including Washington DC–based RAS Records, which signed the band to a multi-album deal, as well as MCA and Atlantic. That year 1992 saw the Mystic Revealers tour the US for the first time, traveling to 17 American cities as they promoted singles "Religion" and "Remember Romeo".

The Mystic Revealers second album, Jah Works, followed in 1993, as did a spot alongside Freddie McGregor, Marcia Griffiths and Big Mountain on that year's edition of the Reggae Sunsplash tour across the U.S. In 1995, the Mystic Revealers were selected to appear at Jamaica's 50th birthday celebration for Bob Marley, alongside the Wailers, Rita Marley, Ziggy Marley, Vanessa Williams, Toots, the Wailing Souls and others. The band's performance of Marley's "Natural Mystic" and "We and Dem" (along with their own "Religion") was "the most solid and satisfying performance of the evening," according to Billboard magazine.

The mid-to-late 1990s marked the Mystic Revealers' period of greatest productivity. Beginning with Space and Time in 1995, the band released an album each year through 1998. Space and Dub, featuring dub versions of Space and Time tracks; appeared in 1996, followed by This One's For Jah (1997) and Crossing the Atlantic (1998).

After nearly two decades of recording and touring, the band opted to go on hiatus in the 2000s. Wilmot's focus turned to surfing, a sport he has helped to legitimize and grow within Jamaica over the last 20 years (while also starring as "CC" in Royal Palm Estate, one of Jamaica's most popular TV series). He formed the Jamaican Surfing Association, one of the Caribbean's first pro surfing bodies, and established the Makka Pro tournament, Jamaica's first international surfing competition, while guiding the professional surf careers of his son, Icah, and daughter, Imani. (His other sons, Inilek and Ivah are also active in the sport).

The band reformed in 2012. In 2015 they released the album Crucial Cuts, gathering tracks from the band's back-catalog. In 2016 they set up the Jamaica Authentic Herb Company, a business aimed at creating Jamaica's first legal ganja producer.

In 2019 Mystics' uninsured house burnt down resulting in the loss of almost all of the artists memorabilia and physical music catalog collection. It was a terrible personal loss but one which inspired him to start recording with the intention to release a new album. The huge advances in home music production technology encouraged Mystic to set up a home recording space on the verandah in Bull Bay, "Pon Di Verandah" or "PDV" Studio. Accessing the talents of his children Ishack (keyboard), Icah (bass) and Inilek (guitars), they collaborated on the home project which evolved into a collection of material which formed the foundation for a new album.

On 10 October 2020, the new 12 song Mystic Revealers Album "Jah Jah People" was digitally released.

== Members ==
Original members

- Anthony "Billy Mystic" Wilmot – guitarist, vocalist and songwriter
- Leroy "Lion" Edwards – guitarist
- Robert "Patch" Walters – keyboard player

Later members

- Nicholas "Drummie" Henry – drummer
- William "Willigan" Cocking – percussionist
- Steve Davis – guitarist and vocalist
- Winston "Metal" Stewart – keyboard player and lead guitarist

== Discography ==
=== Singles ===
- "Winner", Mystic Reggae Sounds, 1982
- "Mash Down Apartheid," Mystic Reggae Sounds 1982
- "Young Revolutionaries/War Planes", Mystic Reggae Sounds
- "Mash Down Apartheid," Oness, 1985.
- "Lady lady", Gachar Productions 1987
- "World War III" Mystic Reggae Sounds
- "Saw you smiling", Mystic Reggae Sounds
- "Saw you smiling" Gong Sounds 1992
- "Got to be a better way" Feat. Angie Angel, Mystic Regae Sounds 1991
- "Gotta Be a Better Way," Uni/MCA, 1993.
- "Rastaman in New York" Kariang/Mystic Regae Sounds 1993
- "January to December", Kariang/Mystic Regae Sounds 1994
- "Im gonna tell you" Feat. Anthony B, Kariang/Mystic Regae Sounds
- "Religion", Mystic Reggae Sounds
- "Borderline", Mystic Regae Sounds/Geofry Chung
- "Religion/Remember Romeo," RAS Records, 1994.
- "When you feel it",
- "Dem Problem/More Problem" Feat. Kulcha Knox & DJ Sojah, Kariang/Mystic Reggae Sounds 1995
- "When I'm far away", feat. Rappa Robert, Kariang 1995
- "Tell dem", feat. Sizzla, Kariang 1996
- "Bun dem", Kariang/ Mystic Regae Sounds 1996
- "Realy", Kariang
- "In my life", Kariang 2003
- "Herb Must Legalize Now" (2016), VP

=== Albums ===
- Young Revolutionaries, Gong Sounds, 1992.
- Jah Works, RAS Records, 1993.
- Space and Time, RAS/REP Records, 1995.
- Space and Dub, RAS Records 1995
- Ras Portraits Mystic Revealers, RAS Records 1996
- This One's for Jah, Atlantic
- Crossing the Atlantic (1998), PARAS
- Jah Jah People, Mystic Revealers, 2020
