= Val Bennett =

- Born: Lovall Bennett
- Died: 1991
- Genres: Ska, rocksteady, reggae, jazz
- Occupation: Musician
- Instruments: Tenor saxophone, trombone
- Years active: Late 1940s – 1991
- Formerly of: The Val Bennett Orchestra; Prince Buster; Bunny Lee All Stars; The Upsetters

Val Bennett (born Lovall Bennett, died 1991) was a Jamaican tenor saxophonist and jazz and roots reggae musician who began his career in the 1940s. He made a number of releases on the Island Records and Crab Records labels.

== Biography ==
In the late 1940s, Bennett led his own band, the Val Bennett Orchestra. Artists that played in Bennett's band included Jah Jerry Haynes, Lloyd Knibb, and Ernest Ranglin, whose first professional experience was with this band. The Val Bennett Orchestra performed regularly at the Colony Club, performing mainly for foreign visitors to Jamaica. The band also toured abroad, performing in countries including Haiti, where they picked up méringue and played it on their return to Jamaica.

In the early to mid-1960s, Bennett was a regular member of Prince Buster's band, playing on many of the singer's best-known recordings, including "Al Capone". Bennett was also a regular studio session musician, appearing on many releases from artists including Theophilus Beckford, Pat Kelly, Barrington Levy, and Delroy Wilson. Bennett's session work included saxophone, horn, and trombone. In the late 1960s, Bennett joined Bunny Lee's "All Stars".

Notable tracks by Bennett include "The Russians Are Coming" (1968), a cover of "Take Five" by the Dave Brubeck Quartet, which would later go on to be used as the theme tune to the British television series The Secret Life of Machines in the late-1980s; and "Tons Of Gold" (1970), with the Harry J Allstars, a version of their track "The Liquidator". Bennett also worked for producer Lee "Scratch" Perry, and his Spaghetti Western-inspired "Return of Django", recorded with Perry's studio band The Upsetters was a major UK hit in 1969. His track "Baby Baby" was also included on The Upsetters' album Eastwood Rides Again. Perry was the only producer to get Bennett to perform vocals, "Baby Baby" being one of these examples, the other being "Barbara".

== See also ==
- Island Records discography
- Music of Jamaica
