= The Skatalites =

Jamaican ska band

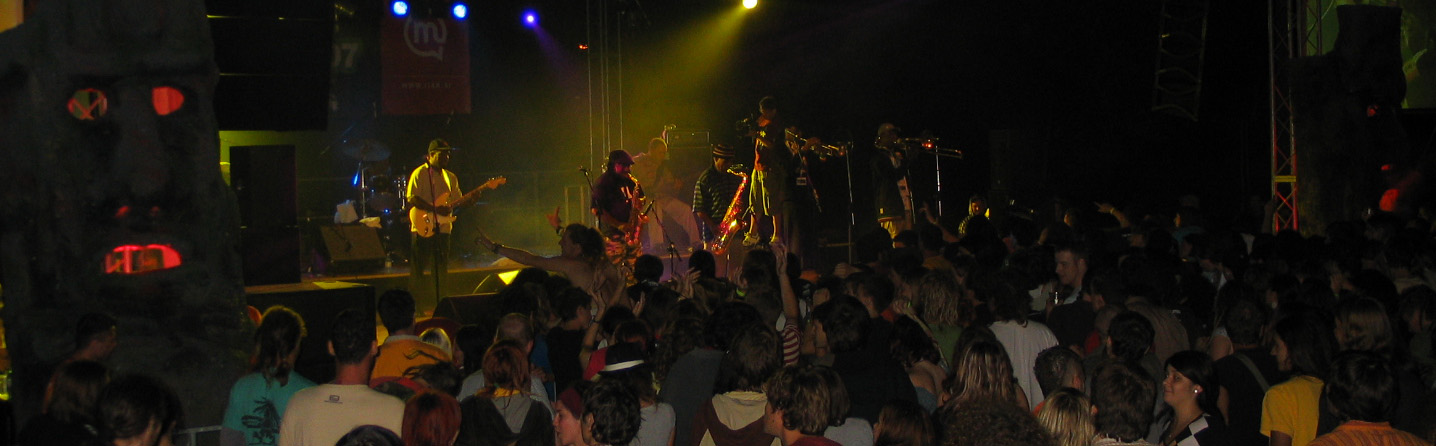
- The Skatalites at Njoki Summer Festival; Ajdovščina, Slovenia, 2007

Background information
- Origin: Jamaica
- Genres: Ska; rocksteady; reggae; ska jazz
- Years active: 1964–1965; 1983–present
- Labels: Studio One; Treasure Isle; King Edwards; Randy's; Top Deck Records; Shanachie Records; Island Records
- Website: https://skatalites.com/

The Skatalites are a ska band from Jamaica. They played initially between 1963 and 1965, and recorded many of their best known songs in the period, including "Guns of Navarone". They also played on records by Prince Buster and backed many other Jamaican artists who recorded during that period, including Bob Marley & The Wailers, on their first single "Simmer Down". They reformed in 1983 and have played together ever since.

== History ==
=== Before the Skatalites: 1954–1964 ===
The founders of the Skatalites were musicians Doreen Shaffer, Tommy McCook (died 1998), Rolando Alphonso (died 1998), Lester Sterling (died 2023), Lloyd Brevett (died 2012), Lloyd Knibb (died 2011), Don Drummond (died 1969), Jah Jerry Haynes (died 2007), Jackie Mittoo (died 1990), and Johnny Moore (died 2008). These musicians started to play together from 1955, when Kingston's recording studios started to develop. Tommy McCook was the first member of the band to record, though not for commercial release: he played with Don Hitchman's Group in 1953. Archie Lindo asked Hitchman to play a few tunes for his pioneer radio station, "ZQI", on their new equipment. Soon after that, sound system pioneer Stanley Motta began to operate his studio, where he recorded calypso and mento that were released on 78s. Rolando Alphonso was one of the first to record with him, probably in 1954.

Though McCook was the first in the band to record, he did not participate in the recording sessions with the other nine musicians. He left Jamaica in 1954 for a jazz gig at the Zanzibar Club in Nassau, Bahamas. He returned to Jamaica in June 1962, and began playing regular jazz sessions around Kingston.

Record producer Coxsone Dodd searched for jazz players around Kingston and was impressed by McCook's playing. Tommy McCook heard some ska, but initially resisted Dodd's offers to record and to lead a studio group, because he was a committed jazzman. In 1962, Dodd released I Cover The Waterfront (Port-O-Jam) with Roland Alphonso and Don Drummond, who did the solo and brass sections. In 1963, he released Jazz Jamaica From the Workshop (Port-O-Jam/Studio One), on which McCook played for the first time since returning to Jamaica. Don Drummond has two tunes on Jazz Jamaica and McCook has one, "The Answer".

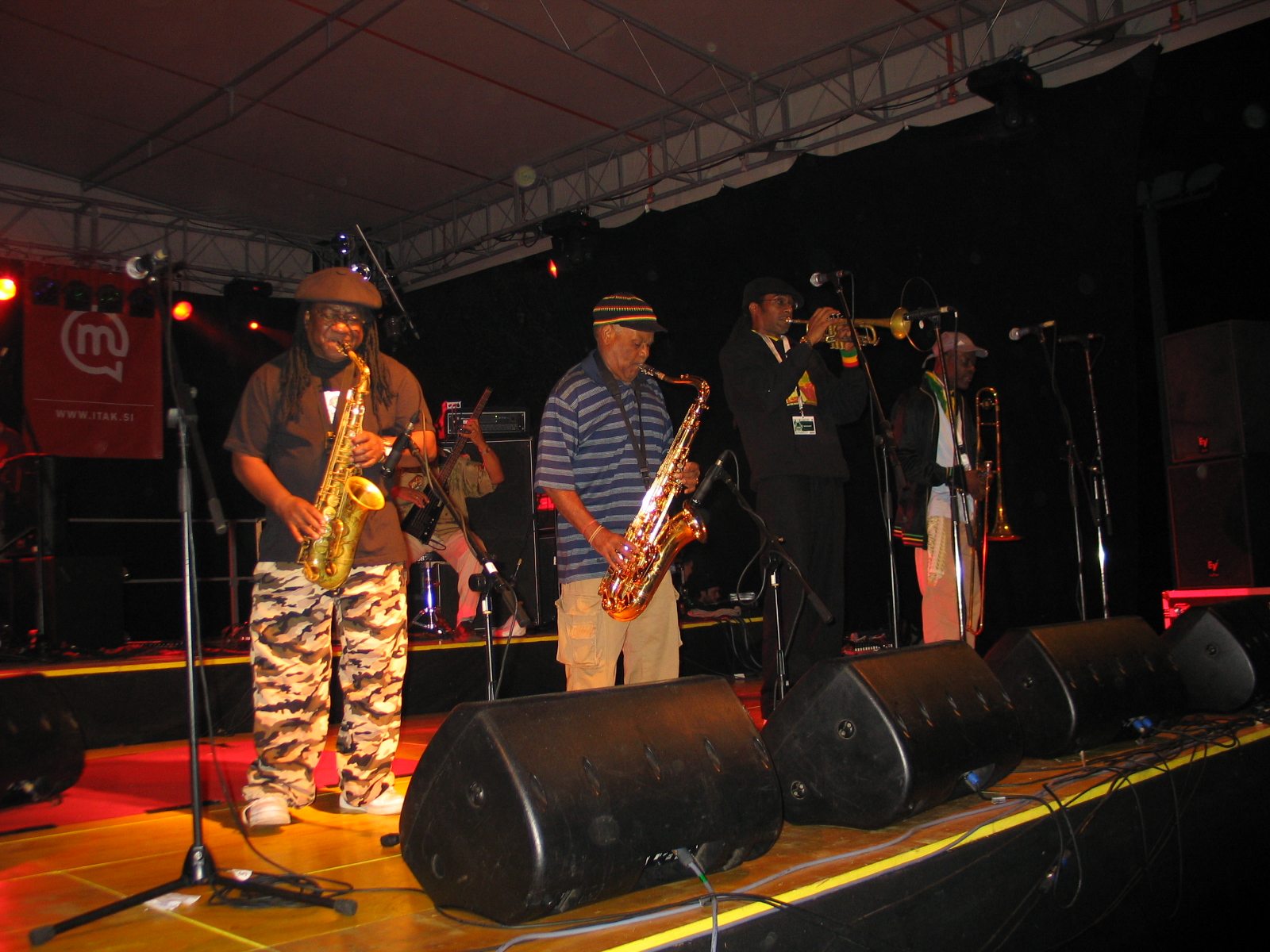
The Skatalites

=== Early years: 1964–1965 ===
In early 1964, a meeting was held with all the would-be Skatalites at The Odeon Theatre. It was owned by The Tawari family who owned many theatres and were offering shows to the band if they formed a band. Lord Tanamo was liked by the Tawaris and they had encouraged him to help unite the musicians that had been playing on all these hits. By this time the various members had played on so many hit songs in so many different studios by so many singers, but few people knew who was playing the instruments because no producers were putting credits on the records. At that time most of the DJs who were spinning records in public, scratched off the titles or the entire label so nobody could spy on them, and know which recording they were even playing. The musicians were tired of working so hard for so little money and so little recognition. This story, and the story of many other groups and bands in Jamaica, is the theme of the film, The Harder They Come.

One of their first albums released was LP Ska Authentic at Studio One in Kingston. Among their many producers were Coxsone Dodd, Duke Reid, Prince Buster, Vincent "King" Edwards, Justin "Phillip" Yap, Leslie Kong, Lindon Pottinger, Sonia Pottinger and Vincent "Randy" Chin. The Skatalites led sessions with top artists and worked with young talents such as Delroy Wilson, Desmond Dekker, The Wailers, and Lee Perry.

The Skatalites played their first public performance in May 1964 at the Hi-Hat Club on Water Lane in Rae Town, Kingston. The venue was owned and operated by Orville "Billy" Farnum. Initially intended as a rehearsal, the session drew such a large crowd that the band decided to charge admission and proceed with a full performance. News of the event spread quickly, and word soon circulated that the musicians behind many of Jamaica's hit records had officially formed a band, now known as The Skatalites. Coxsone Dodd helped initially: "At the formation of the band, I supplied the PA system, microphones and what ever it is. Also the guitar amplifier and other amplifier. I helped with transportation and I supplied storage for equipment and instruments. I was a part of promoting the first gigs and other gigs to get it off the ground, because I figured more or less, if I am recording the Skatalites, its good to get them popular out in the streets, yunno?"

Trombonist Don Drummond had at least 200 tunes to his name by 1965. On 1 January 1965, Drummond was arrested for the murder of his girlfriend, Anita "Marguerita" Mahfood. He was later convicted and remanded to the Bellevue Asylum.

In August 1965, The Skatalites played their last show. They broke up into two supergroups, Rolando Alphonso and the Soul Vendors and Tommy McCook and the Supersonics. In April 1967, The Skatalites' ska adaptation of the theme to the film The Guns of Navarone entered the Top 40 of the UK Singles Chart. Don Drummond died on 6 May 1969, in the Bellevue Asylum.

=== Early reunions: 1974–1988 ===
The Skatalites' first reunion happened in the studio, during 1974 sessions for bass player Lloyd Brevett's solo album. After laying down hand percussion tracks at Lee Perry's studio, Brevett was joined by McCook, Alphonso, Sterling, Knibb and Mittoo. Ernest Ranglin played guitar, with Oswald Brooks on trumpet. The album was eventually released as African Roots, a collection of mostly Brevett compositions, and has been variously released both as a Lloyd Brevett and as a Skatalites album, with most editions crediting "Lloyd Brevett and The Skatalites".

In 1979, The Skatalites again joined in the studio, this time to record an album for Chris Blackwell. The album, tentatively entitled The Big Guns, was not released at the time, due to a disagreement between McCook and Blackwell, and remains unreleased.

In June 1983, The Skatalites reformed and played the Reggae Sunsplash festival in Montego Bay in July, after festival director Ronnie Burke persuaded them to appear at the fifth anniversary of the festival, despite Moore and McCook having not spoken since the band split. Their show was very successful, and the band played more concerts in Jamaica, while taking offers to tour abroad. The line-up at this time reflected the original line-up of the band, with the exception of Drummond, and joined by guests Arnold Breckenridge and Bubbles Cameron. Recordings from 27 June and 17 July 1983 were released on the live album Stretching Out, although the band later claimed on their website that they received no payment for this recording and discouraged fans from buying it.

During their 1983 rehearsals for Sunsplash, the band recorded eleven tracks at the newly opened Music Mountain studio, led this time by Jackie Mittoo and under the guidance of producer/promoter Tony Owens. After five days of recording, the sessions were abandoned after the members apparently fell out with one another. Nine completed tracks were eventually released in 2007 on Motion Records as Rolling Steady: The 1983 Music Mountain Sessions. The album included their tribute to Don Drummond, "Big Trombone", with Lord Tanamo on vocals.

In April 1984, the same lineup, but without Mittoo, recorded The Return of The Big Guns, released on Mango Records in the UK, with several tracks based on charts written by Drummond and arranged by McCook. On 7 July 1984, The Skatalites played to thousands at Selhurst Park during the London Sunsplash. The Skatalites played seven tunes and also backed Prince Buster on three before closing with a reprise of their theme song, "Freedom Sounds". This performance was later released as a live album called Live at Sunsplash but is very rare.

Between 1985 and 1988, the core members of the Skatalites emigrated and united in the northeast of the United States. They played their first US concert at The Village Gate and began to play spotted dates in Northeast US.

=== 1986–present ===
The Skatalites began emigrating to the US since the 1970s Eventually enough members had arrived that enabled them to book a few shows beginning with shows in 1986 in New York City. It took a few years before they actually started touring the US in 1989 as support act for their old friend Bunny Wailer's Liberation Tour from coast to coast including Radio City Music Hall, Irvine Meadows, The Music Hall in Boston and many other prestigious venues. In early 1990 the band emerged on the market officially on the first headline tour from NYC to California and back. They were always working on new music but the first official record deal in US was with Shanachie and they released Skavoovee, Grammy nominated Hi-Bop Ska, and Grammy nominated Greetings from Skamania. The next release was Ball of Fire in 1997 on Island Records. A "Best of The Skatalites" type release was done by Heartbeat Records the same year, entitled Foundation Ska. In 2000 they recorded an album with all newly composed material by each member entitled Bashaka. In 2001 they recorded From Paris With Love. In 2004 The Skatalites were featured on the album True Love by Toots and the Maytals, which won the Grammy Award in 2004 for Best Reggae Album, and showcased many notable musicians including Willie Nelson, Eric Clapton, Jeff Beck, Trey Anastasio, Gwen Stefani / No Doubt, Ben Harper, Bonnie Raitt, Manu Chao, The Roots, Ryan Adams, Keith Richards, Toots Hibbert, Paul Douglas, Jackie Jackson, and Ken Boothe. Later that year, original member Lloyd Brevett left the band. In April that year, the Skatalites started a new world tour with their new bass player Val Douglas, whose A-Team band was the primary backing band for Reggae Sunsplash Tours through the 1980s and 1990s. In October 2005, The Skatalites released The Skatalites in Orbit, Vol.1 recorded live in Buenos Aires, recorded during concerts on 23 and 24 September 2005. In March 2006, The Skatalites played at La Bal De La Rose for Caroline, Princess of Hanover, along with Jimmy Cliff, The Wailers and Alpha Blondy. This show started the 2006 Global Orbit Tour reaching Australia, New Zealand, Chile and Argentina. In April 2006, Skatalites recorded 11 new tunes and one cover in Byron Bay, Australia, at the 301 Studios, released the following year as the album On The Right Track by AIM International, Australia. In September 2007, The Skatalites contributed the track "Be My Guest", with Ben Harper on vocals, to the Fats Domino tribute CD Goin' Home: A Tribute to Fats Domino featuring numerous artists. This CD raised funds for all the musicians affected by Hurricane Katrina.

On 12 May 2011, founding member and drummer Lloyd Knibb died at the age of 80. Bass player and fellow founding member Lloyd Brevett died after suffering a stroke on 3 May 2012, aged 80.

On 8 February 2012, the band announced a new single and album as well as a US tour starting in Texas and heading to New Mexico, Colorado, Arizona, Oregon, California, Washington, and then Canada. These dates follow four dates they announced in January for the North East. Initially announced under the working title All Roads, the studio album was released in April 2012 as Walk With Me and featured the final studio recordings of founding drummer Lloyd Knibb, alongside founding members Lester Sterling and Doreen Shaffer, bassist Val Douglas, keyboardist Cameron Greenlee, guitarist Aurélien "Natty Frenchy" Metsch, saxophonist Azemobo "Zem" Audu, trombonist Andrae Murchison, trumpeter Kevin Batchelor, and drummer Trevor "Sparrow" Thompson.

On 26 August 2016, the band released the album Platinum Ska, and toured through the United States, Hong Kong, Japan, Mexico, France, Italy, and the United Kingdom.

== Members ==
=== Current members ===
- Doreen Shaffer – vocals
- Val Douglas – bass
- Yanik Williams – drums
- Ken Stewart – keyboards
- Aurelien Metsch aka Natty Frenchy – guitar
- Anant Pradhan – saxophone
- Vin "Don Drummond Junior" Gordon – trombone
- James Smith – trumpet
- Larry McDonald – percussion and vocals

=== Former members ===
- Lester Sterling – alto saxophone (founding member; 1964-2014; died 2023)
- Tommy McCook – tenor saxophone, flute (founding member; died 1998)
- Roland Alphonso – tenor saxophone (founding member; died 1998)
- Don Drummond – trombone (founding member; died 1969)
- Johnny "Dizzy" Moore – trumpet (founding member; died 2008)
- Lloyd Brevett – upright bass (founding member; died 2012)
- Lloyd Knibb – drums (founding member; died 2011)
- Jerome "Jah Jerry" Haynes – guitar (founding member; died 2007)
- Jackie Mittoo – piano (founding member; died 1990)
- Greg Glassman – trumpet
- Mark Berney – trumpet
- Nathan Breedlove – trumpet (1990–98)
- Cedric "Im" Brooks – tenor saxophone (2000–03, 2008–10; died 2013)
- Karl "Cannonball" Bryan – saxophone (2003–08)
- Calvin "Bubbles" Cameron – trombone (1983–84,89,04)
- Welford "Will" Clark – trombone (1994–2003)
- Buford O'Sullivan – trombone
- Devon James – guitar (1987–2009)
- Bill Smith – keyboards (1993–98)
- Cary Brown – keyboards (1990–93)
- Ken Stewart – keyboards (1988–90,1998-2009,2013-present; also serves as the band's manager)
- Cameron Greenlee – keyboards (2009–2013)
- Clark Gayton – trombone (1989–94)
- Cary Brown – keyboards (1990–95)
- Luis Bonilla – trombone
- Arnold "Willie" Brackenridge – trumpet (1983–84)
- Kevin Batchelor – trumpet (2002–2012)
- Azemobo "Zem" Audu – tenor saxophone (2010-2020)
- Andre Murchison – trombone (2006-2019)
- Travis Antoine – trumpet (2012-2018)
- James Smith – trumpet (2018–present)

=== Additional personnel ===
Although not official band members, these musicians worked with the Skatalites extensively during the 1964-65 period in the recording studio, or in the case of the vocalists, at live shows. Lord Tanamo, Doreen Shaffer, Baba Brooks, and Ernest Ranglin have all worked with the reunited Skatalites at different times, both live and in the studio.

- Jackie Opel – vocals
- Doreen Shaffer – vocals
- Tony DaCosta – vocals
- Tony Gregory – vocals
- Lord Tanamo – vocals
- Dennis "Ska" Campbell – tenor saxophone
- Oswald "Baba" Brooks – trumpet
- Frank Anderson – trumpet
- Ernest Ranglin – lead guitar
- Lyn Taitt – rhythm guitar
- Winston Grennan – Drums

== Discography ==
=== Studio albums ===
- Ska Authentic (Studio One, 1964)
- Ska Boo-Da-Ba (Top Deck/Doctor Bird, 1966)
- Ska Authentic Vol. 2 (Studio One, 1967)
- Celebration Time (Studio One, 1968)
- The Skatalite! (Treasure Isle, 1969)
- The Legendary Skatalites/African Roots also known as Rebirth, produced by Lloyd Brevett (Jam Sounds, 1975/United Artists, 1976)
- Rolling Steady: The 1983 Music Mountain Sessions (Motion, recorded 1983, released 2007)
- Return of the Big Guns (Island, 1984)
- Ska Voovee (Shanachie, 1993)
- Hi-Bop Ska (Shanachie, 1994)
- Greetings from Skamania (Shanachie, 1996)
- Ball of Fire (Island, 1998)
- Bashaka with Ken Boothe (Marston Recording Corporation, 2000)
- From Paris with Love (World Village, 2002/Wrasse, 2009)
- On the Right Track (AIM, 2007)
- Walk With Me (Wrasse, 2012)
- Platinum Ska (Island Empire, 2016)

=== Live albums ===
- Live at Sunsplash (Synergy, 1984)
- Stretching Out (ROIR, 1986) Recorded 1983
- Ska Splash (Moon Ska Europe / Pressure Drop, 1999) Recorded on the "Ska Splash" European tour of 1996
- Roots Party (FullFill, 2003)
- Live at Lokerse Feesten 1997 & 2002 CD/DVD (Charly, 2006)
- In Orbit Vol. 1 – Live from Argentina (Phantom Sound & Vision, 2006)
- Skatalites in Orbit, Vol. 1 & 2 (Sony, 2010)
- Ska-talites – History of Ska, Rocksteady & Reggae (United Sound Records, 2015)
- Live at the Belly Up (Belly Up Live, 2020)

=== Collaboration albums ===
- 1963 – The Long Hot Summer with Laurel Aitken (1963)
- In the Mood for Ska with Lord Tanamo (Trojan 1967)
- With Sly & Robbie & Taxi Gang (Vista, 1984)
- Ska Titans: Laurel Aitken & The Skatalites (1999)
- Ska Splash with Laurel Aitken and House of Rhythm (Moonska, 2002)
- Long Hot Summer 1963 Volume 2 with Laurel Aitken (Grover, 2006)

=== Anthologies and reissues ===
- Scattered Lights (Alligator, 1984)
- Hog in a Cocoa Skatalites & Friends (Culture Press/Orange Street, 1993)
- Foundation Ska (Heartbeat/Pgd, 1997)
- Skatalites and Friends at Randy's (VP Records, 1998)
- Ska Boo-Da-Ba: Top Sounds from Top Deck, Volume 3 (Westside UK, 1998)
- Ska-Ta-Shot: Top Sounds from Top Deck, Volume 4 (Westside UK, 1998)
- Ska-Tola: Top Sounds from Top Deck, Volume 5 (Westside UK, 1998)
- Heroes of Reggae in Dub: The Skatalites Meet King Tubby (Guava Jelly, 1999)
- Nucleus of Ska (Music Club, 2001)
- The Legendary Skatalites in Dub (Motion, 2001)
- Herb Dub, Collie Dub (Motion, 2002)
- Lucky Seven (Proper Pairs, 2002)
- Musical Communion (Culture Press, 2003)
- Guns of Navarone – Best of Skatalites (Sanctuary Records, 2003)
- Phoenix City: A History of the World's Greatest Ska Band (Sanctuary Records, 2004)
- In the Mood for Ska – The Moonska Years (Recall Records UK, 2004)
- Independent Ska (Atom Music, 2006)
- Anthology (Primo, 2007)
- The Skatalites Play Ska (Kingston Sounds, 2007)
- Kingston 11 (King Edwards, 2008)
- Occupation Ska! Very Best of Skatalites (101 Distribution, 2009)
- The Skatalites Box Set (Pinnacle/Attack Records, 2009)
- Rollin' On (King Edwards, 2010)

=== Compilations ===
- R.O.R.X. – The Tenth Annual Reggae On The Rocks – August 10, 1996 (1996), performing "Guns Of Navarone" (live).
- The Rough Guide to Reggae (World Music Network, 1997); a vintage recording of "Chinatown" credited to Don Drummond & The Skatalites.
- Ska Island (Island Records, 1997), performing their own "Magic Star", as well as "Can't You See" with Doreen Shaffer, and "King of Kings" with Prince Buster.
- Give 'Em the Boot (Hellcat Records, 1997), performing "Latin Goes Ska"
- True Love (V2 Records, 2004), performing "Never Grow Old" with Toots and the Maytals, Terry Hall and U-Roy
- Another World Is Possible (Uncivilized World Records, 2005), performing "Freedom Sounds" (live)
- Music From Glastonbury The Film (The Glastonbury Phonographic Society, 2006), performing "Phoenix City" (live at the 2003 Glastonbury Festival)
- Goin' Home: A Tribute to Fats Domino (Vanguard Records, 2007), performing Domino's "Be My Guest", with Ben Harper
