= Baba Brooks =

Oswald Brooks
- Origin: Kingston, Jamaica
- Genres: Reggae, ska
- Instrument: Trumpet
- Label: Studio One

Oswald "Baba" Brooks (born c. 1935) was a Jamaican jazz trumpet player who played in the 1950s with the Eric Dean Orchestra. Brooks also recorded with producers Duke Reid, Sonia Pottinger, Prince Buster.

== Biography ==
Brooks was born in Kingston, Jamaica, around 1935. He played trumpet on recording sessions from the late 1950s onwards, often uncredited, and formed his own band in the early 1960s, having a hit in 1962 with "Independence Ska", which celebrated Jamaica's break from colonialism. He also performed on several sessions with the Skatalites. He had further hits in 1964 with "Bus Strike" and "Musical Workshop". The band followed this in 1965 with "Guns Fever", recorded at Studio One. Brooks and his band continued to play on recording sessions until the early 1970s.

== Albums ==
Songs

- "King Size", B-side to the Saints' 'Brown Eyes'
