= Reggae Sunsplash =

Reggae music festival in Jamaica

- Genre: Reggae, dancehall, etc.
- Locations: Northern Jamaica, international
- Years active: 1978–96, 1998, 2006
- Founders: Synergy Productions Ltd
- Website: Reggae Festival Guide

Reggae Sunsplash was a reggae music festival held annually in Jamaica from 1978 to 1996, with additional events in 1998 and 2006. The festival expanded to include international tours in 1985 and was revived as a virtual event in 2020 by Tryone Wilson, Media and Event mogul, Debbie Bissoon and Randy.

== History ==
The Reggae Sunsplash festival was jointly conceived by four Jamaicans—Tony Johnson, Don Green, Ronnie Burke and John Wakeling. These four individuals established Synergy Productions Ltd, a company responsible for the promotion and production of the Reggae Sunsplash festival.

The first Reggae Sunsplash festival took place at Jarrett Park in Montego Bay, Jamaica, in June 1978. The event commenced at dusk and continued until dawn over a span of seven days. With the support of Peter Martin, a veteran in Jamaican tourism, and his public relations firm, Peter Martin Associates, the festival garnered international recognition. It was promoted as the "biggest reggae festival in the history of the world".

Reggae Sunsplash introduced the concept of combining music and travel to boost tourism in Jamaica. Prior to the festival, Jamaican hotels typically closed during the summer season. The festival's annual staging by its five founding partners helped establish a new summer tourist season in the region. The event's success also prompted the emergence of other annual music festivals across Jamaica and the Caribbean islands. As attendance increased, so did the demand for accommodations, leading some attendees to adopt the practice of camping on local beaches during the festival.

To promote Jamaica as a tourist and traveling target in Europe, the Jamaica Tourist Board invited the German band Supermax as the opening act of the annual festival in Montego Bay in 1983. From 1981, the festivals were filmed and recorded, with several videos and albums released, the first being Reggae Sunsplash '81: Tribute to Bob Marley, released by Elektra Records. From 1987 the festival included a sound clash event, with finalists from a national sound system competition competing as a precursor to the rest of the festival. The festival also expanded to include an 'oldies night' featuring stars from past eras of Jamaican music. For many years the festival was emceed by Tommy Cowan.

In 1984 the Reggae Sunsplash festival expanded into international events with a one-day festival staged at Selhurst Park in London, England. In 1985, the Reggae Sunsplash World Tour was launched in the United States and Japan and subsequent years saw the Reggae Sunsplash festival touring extensively throughout North America, Europe, South America, and the Far East. 1991 saw the introduction of a "Caribbean Night" featuring other Caribbean music such as soca, and the following year the festival's scope increased further with the addition of a "World Beat Night".

While the festival had become hugely popular, opening new global tourist niche markets to Jamaica and attracting millions of dollars of foreign exchange into the country, it had not been a financial success, largely due to the lack of sponsorship or government support. In 1995 the Chairman of the Jamaica Tourist Board operating through a company called Radobar Holdings Ltd offered financial assistance in exchange for equity in Synergy Productions, the founders of Reggae Sunsplash. This initial offer was never consummated and in a disputed claim Radobar Holdings announced the formation of a company called Reggae Sunsplash International in Jamaica and proceeded with the hostile takeover of the Reggae Sunsplash festival. The first attempt at staging Reggae Sunsplash without the original owners Synergy Productions in 1996 was a financial disaster for the new claimants. In 1997 the Reggae Sunsplash festival was postponed until 1998 to hold celebrations of the birth of Bob Marley but more losses were incurred.

After a twelve-year absence from the British music festival calendar, Reggae Sunsplash returned to London in 1999. The event had previously been staged in the United Kingdom between 1984 and 1987 by Capital Radio Music Festival and Sunsplash Promotions, a subsidiary of Synergy, the company responsible for first bringing the festival to Britain. In 1999, music promoter Andrew Pritchard secured the rights to stage Reggae Sunsplash in London. The festival was held at Victoria Park in August that year to mark the event's 21st anniversary.

The festival was re-established by the Johnson family in 2006, but it was unsuccessful. However, the international touring festival has continued.

Two of the founding directors, John Wakeling and Tony Johnson, have died. With the passing of Tony Johnson, several individuals have unsuccessfully tried to claim the rights to the festival, and all have failed to recapture the spirit of the original festival. Don Green and Ronnie Burke are the two remaining Reggae Sunsplash founders alive.

In August 2015 it was announced that Burke would be awarded the Order of Distinction by the Jamaican government in recognition of his contribution to the development of Jamaican music.

Reggae Sunsplash returned as a virtual festival on November 27–28, 2020 after a 14-year absence. Performers included Tanya Stephens, Richie Spice, Capleton, Masicka, Dexta Dapps, Jesse Royal, Agent Sasco, and Romain Virgo.

== Dates and venues ==
- 1978: June 23–30, Jarrett Park, Montego Bay
- 1979: July 3–7, Jarrett Park, Montego Bay
- 1980: July 2–5, Ranny Williams Entertainment Center, Kingston
- 1981: August 4–8, Jarrett Park, Montego Bay
- 1982: August 3–7, Jarrett Park, Montego Bay
- 1983: June 28-July 2, Bob Marley Center, Montego Bay
- 1984: July 7, Selhurst Park Stadium, London, England
- 1984: August 7–11, Jarrett Park, Montego Bay
- 1985: June 29, Selhurst Park Stadium, London, England
- 1985: August 6–10, Jarrett Park, Montego Bay
- 1986: August 26–30: Jarrett Park, Montego Bay
- 1987: July 5, Clapham Common, London, England
- 1987: August 18–22, Bob Marley Center, Montego Bay
- 1988: August 15–22, Bob Marley Center, Montego Bay
- 1989: August 14–19, Bob Marley Center, Montego Bay
- 1990: June 24, Pine Knob Music Theater, Clarkston, MI
- 1990: July 16–21, Bob Marley Center, Montego Bay
- 1991: July 26–31, Bob Marley Center, Montego Bay
- 1992: August 3–8, Bob Marley Center, Montego Bay
- 1993: August 3–7, Jamworld, Portmore
- 1994: August 1–6: Jamworld, Portmore
- 1995: July 12–14, Dover, St. Ann
- 1996: August 1–4, Chukka Cove, St. Ann
- 1998: February 5–8, Reggae Park, St. Ann
- 1999: Vicroria Park, London, England

- 2006: August 3–6, Richmond Estate, Priory, St. Ann

== Albums ==
- Big Youth - Live At Reggae Sunsplash (1982), Sunsplash/Trojan
- Chalice - Live At Reggae Sunsplash (1982), Pipe Music
- Yellowman - Live At Reggae Sunsplash (1982), Sunsplash
- Eek-A-Mouse & Michigan & Smiley - Live at Reggae Sunsplash (1983), Sunsplash
- The Gladiators & Israel Vibration - Live at Reggae Sunsplash (1983), Sunsplash
- Toots & The Maytals - Live At Reggae Sunsplash (1983), Sunsplash
- The Twinkle Brothers - Live At Reggae Sunsplash 82 (Since I Throw The Comb Away), (1983), Sunsplash
- The Mighty Diamonds & Mutabaruka - Live At Reggae Sunsplash, Genes

Various Artists

- Reggae Sunsplash '81: Tribute to Bob Marley (1981), Elektra
- Best of the Festival - Day One Live at Reggae Sunsplash 1982 (1982), Sunsplash
- Reggae Sunsplash Live (1982), RCA
- Sunsplash Live (1983), 56 Hope Rd
- Reggae Sunsplash '86 (1986), Bellaphon
- Best of Reggae Sunsplash (1994), Genes

== Video ==
- Reggae By Bus (1979)(AKA Reggae Sunsplash II), a Film By Stefan Paul (The first Sunsplash on film)
- Reggae Sunsplash 10th Anniversary 1987(001)(Phase Three Productions)(Synergy)
- Reggae Sunsplash Dancehall 88, Charly (VHS)
- Reggae Sunsplash - 10th Anniversary Of Reggae Sunsplash - Dancehall X, Charly (VHS)
- Reggae Sunsplash Dancehall '89 (1990), Charly (VHS)
- Reggae Sunsplash '90, Variety Night, Charly (VHS)
- Reggae Sunsplash Dancehall Special, Charly
- Reggae Sunsplash Music Festival - Best Of Sunsplash 1991 (1992), Warner Music Vision (VHS)
- All Time Best of Reggae Sunsplash Music Festival (1993), Warner Music Vision (VHS)
- Reggae Sunsplash II (2003), Columbia (DVD)
- Cool Runnings: The Reggae Movie (2005), Xenon (DVD)
- The Best Of Reggae Sunsplash (2006), 4digital (DVD)

== See also ==
- List of reggae festivals
- Reggae
- Reggae Sumfest
