= Roland Alphonso =

Jamaican saxophonist

- Born: 12 January 1931; Havana, Cuba
- Origin: Jamaica
- Died: 20 November 1998 (aged 67)
- Genres: Ska, Rocksteady, Reggae
- Instruments: Alto saxophone, tenor saxophone, baritone saxophone, flute
- Years active: Late 1940s – 1998
- Label: Gay Feet
- Formerly of: The Skatalites; The Soul Vendors

Roland Alphonso OD or Rolando Alphonso a.k.a. "The Chief Musician" (12 January 1931 – 20 November 1998) was a Jamaican tenor saxophonist, and one of the founding members of the Skatalites.

== Biography ==
Born in Havana, Cuba, Alphonso came to Jamaica at the age of two with his Jamaican mother, and started to learn saxophone at the Stony Hill Industrial School.

In 1948 he left school to join Eric Deans' orchestra and soon passed through other bands in the hotel circuit and first recorded as a member of Stanley Motta's group in 1952, going on to record frequently as a session musician. In 1956 he first recorded for Clement "Coxsone" Dodd, although these early recordings were lost before they were mastered. By 1958, he was a part of the stage-act of comedians Bim and Bam, who toured Jamaica sponsored by "McAulay liquor". Alphonso's dynamic version of Louis Prima's "Robin Hood" was one of highlights of the act. Following this, Clement Dodd and Duke Reid made him a regular member of their in-house band of session musicians. In 1959 he joined the band of Cluett Johnson named Clue J & His Blues Blasters and backed many of Dodd's recording sessions in a typical Jamaican R&B style. He also acted as arranger at many of Dodd's recording sessions.

By 1960, he was recording for many other producers such as Duke Reid, Lloyd "The Matador" Daley and King Edwards, as well as continuing to work for Dodd, contributing alto, tenor, and baritone saxophones, and flute to recordings. During this period he played in many different bands, such as The Alley Cats, The City Slickers, and Aubrey Adams & The Dew Droppers. In 1963, after a few months spent in Nassau, Bahamas, he took part in the creation of The Studio One Orchestra, the first session band at Dodd's newly opened recording studio. This band soon adopted the name of The Skatalites.

When the Skatalites disbanded by August 1965, Alphonso formed the Soul Brothers (with Johnny "Dizzy" Moore, and Jackie Mittoo) to become The Soul Vendors in 1967. In the late 1960s and early 1970s, Alphonso led the Ruinaires, the resident band at Ruins restaurant/nightclub, this coming to an end when he suffered a stroke at the age of 41. He recovered quickly from this setback, and relocated to the United States in late 1972, soon returning to performing and recording. He released the first album under his name in 1973 on the Studio One record label.

During the 1970s, 1980s, and 1990s, he kept on playing on numerous records coming out from Jamaican studios, especially for Bunny Lee, and he toured with many bands. In the late 1970s and early 1980s, he played with the band Jah Malla, performing regularly on the live circuit around New York.

He was awarded Officer of the Order of Distinction by the Jamaican government in 1977, and started to tour more often in the US. He took part in the reformation of the Skatalites in 1983, with whom he toured and recorded constantly until he suffered a burst blood vessel in his head during a show at the Key Club in Hollywood on 2 November 1998. He died on 20 November 1998 at Cedars-Sinai Medical Center in Los Angeles, after suffering a second burst blood vessel, and spending four days in a coma.

== Discography ==
- I Cover The Waterfront, 1962 – Port O Jam Hi-Fi – produced by Coxsone Dodd
- ABC Rock Steady (with The Originals Orchestra), 1968 – Gayfeet/High Note – produced by Sonia Pottinger
- The Best of Rolando Alphonso, 1973 – Studio One (compilation) – produced by Coxsone Dodd
- King of Sax, 1975 – Studio One (compilation) – produced by Coxsone Dodd
- Brighter Shade of Roots, 1982 – Imperial – produced by Bunny Lee
- Roll On, 1984 – Wackies – produced by Lloyd Barnes
- Something Special: Ska Hot Shots, 2000 – Heartbeat (compilation) – produced by Coxsone Dodd
- Max's Skansas City (Lost Recordings from the N.Y.C. Club) - Jungle Records (compilation)
