= Sonia Pottinger =

Jamaican record producer (1931–2010)

Background information
- Born: Sonia Eloise Durrant; 21 June 1931; Leith Hall, St. Thomas, Jamaica
- Died: 3 November 2010 (aged 79) Kingston, Jamaica
- Genres: Reggae
- Occupation: Producer
- Years active: 1965–1985
- Labels: Gay Feet, Tip Top, Rainbow, High Note, Treasure Isle

Sonia Eloise Pottinger OD (née Durrant; 21 June 1931 – 3 November 2010) was a Jamaican reggae record producer. An icon in the music business, Sonia Pottinger was the first female Jamaican record producer and produced artists from the mid-1960s until the mid-1980s.

== Biography ==
Sonia Durrant was born in Leith Hall, Saint Thomas Parish, Jamaica. She moved to Kingston as a child, and attended St George's girls school. She trained as a secretary and followed an accountancy course before marrying accountant Lindon O. Pottinger. The couple set up several businesses in Kingston, including a bicycle shop and a bakery. In 1961 Lindon Pottinger opened a small recording studio – the first in Jamaica to be owned by a black person – to produce recordings by local acts. He set up several record labels including Gaydisc and SEP (Sonia's initials), and recorded acts including the Maytals, Derrick Harriott, Lord Tanamo, and teenager Millie Small.

In 1964, Lindon Pottinger sold his recording equipment to Duke Reid and shortly afterwards the Pottingers separated. Sonia decided to continue producing records. She opened her Tip Top Records Shop in 1965 and started to record musicians in 1966. The first single she issued was "Every Night" by Joe White & Chuck. Other artists recorded during this period included Roland Alphonso. Throughout the rock steady and early reggae eras, she became prolific with hits by The Ethiopians ("The Whip"), Delano Stewart, The Melodians ("Swing And Dine"), Ken Boothe, Alton Ellis and Toots & the Maytals, released on her Gay Feet, Tip Top, Rainbow, and High Note labels. In the early 1970s her work was less prolific, but in 1974 she bought the Treasure Isle label from long-time friend Duke Reid shortly before his death. Her rights to the label's recordings were challenged by the Jamaica Recording and Publishing Studio Limited (the company created by Reid's rival Clement "Coxsone" Dodd), Reid's son Anthony and his company Treasure Isle Records International Limited, and Edward "Bunny" Lee, but the case was decided in her favour in 2009.

In the 1970s, she produced albums by Bob Andy, Marcia Griffiths, Culture, U Roy and Big Youth. Her most well known production is Culture's Harder Than The Rest album, released in 1978. In the dancehall era she produced Archie & Lynn's "Rat in the Centre". She retired from the music business in 1985.

Sonia Pottinger died at her home in Kingston on 3 November 2010, after suffering for some time with Alzheimer's disease. A thanksgiving service in her honour was held on 19 November 2010, attended by Minister of Culture Olivia 'Babsy' Grange and major figures from the Jamaican music industry including Judy Mowatt, Alvin Ranglin, Donovan Germain, and Tommy Cowan.

== Partial discography ==
- Various Artists – Dancing Down Orange Street (High Note, 1969)
- Various Artists – Musical Feast (Heartbeat Records, 1991)
- Various Artists – The Reggae Train (More Great Hits From The High Note Label) (Heartbeat, 1996)
- Various Artists – Put on Your Best Dress: Sonia Pottinger's Rock Steady 1967–1968
- Various Artists – Queen Patsy & Stranger Cole (Fabulous Songs of Miss Sonia Pottinger Vol.1) (Rock A Shacka, 2007)
- Culture – Harder Than The Rest (High Note, 1978)
- Culture – Culture in Dub (High Note / Heartbeat, 1978)
- Culture – Cumbolo (High Note, 1979)
- Culture – International Herb (High Note, 1979)
- Culture – Trod On (High Note / Heartbeat, 1993)
- Culture – Production Something (High Note / Heartbeat, 1998)
- Various Artists – Old Hits of the Past (High Note)
- Joe White & Chuck Josephs – Every Night (Gay Feet)
- Joe White & Chuck Josephs – My Love For You (Gay Feet)
- The Hippy Boys – Dr No Go (High Note)
- Various Artists – Time To Remember (High Note)
- Phyllis Dillon – One Life To Live (Treasure Isle)
- Bob Andy – Lots of Love And I (High Note)
- Sonia Spence – In The Dark (High Note & Sky Note)
- Claudell Clarke – How Great Is Our God (Glory)
- Otis Wright – Sacred Songs (High Note, 1969)
- Otis Wright – Soul Stirring Gospel (Glory)
- Otis Wright – Man of Galilee (Glory)
- Various Artists – Chorus Time (Glory)
- Various Artists – Hottest Hits Vol.1 (Treasure Isle). Compiled and produced by Sonia Pottinger
- Various Artists – Hottest Hits Vol.2 (Treasure Isle). Compiled and produced by Mrs Sonia Pottinger
- Various Artists – Treasure Dub Vol.1. Mixed by Errol Brown. Produced by Sonia Pottinger
- Various Artists – Treasure Dub Vol.2. Mixed by Errol Brown. Produced by Sonia Pottinger
- Justin Hinds & the Dominoes – From Jamaica with Reggae. Produced by Sonia Pottinger
