= Tommy McCook =

Jamaican saxophonist (1927–1998)

- Born: Thomas Matthew McCook; 4 March 1927; Havana, Cuba
- Origin: Jamaica
- Died: 5 May 1998 (aged 71) Conyers, Georgia
- Genres: Ska, rocksteady, reggae, Dub
- Instrument: Saxophone
- Labels: Studio One, Joe Gibbs, Blood and Fire, Yabby Yu, Treasure Isle, Micron, Grove Music, Live and Love, Weed Beat, Island Records.
- Formerly of: The Skatalites; Tommy McCook and the Supersonics

Tommy McCook OD (4 March 1927 – 5 May 1998) was a Jamaican saxophonist. A founding member of The Skatalites, he also directed The Supersonics for Duke Reid, and backed many sessions for Bunny Lee or with The Revolutionaries at Channel One Studios in the 1970s.

== Biography ==
=== Early life ===
Thomas Matthew McCook was born March 4, 1927. While some sources claim he was born to Jamaican parents in Havana, Cuba, and moved to Jamaica in 1933, others claim that he was born in Kingston, Jamaica.

He was raised by his mother, who worked in the kitchen of a beachfront music club in Kingston. There, McCook sometimes watched bands rehearse, an experience he later cited as fostering an early interest in music. He began learning the tenor saxophone at age eleven, after his mother enrolled him at the Alpha Cottage School in 1938.

=== Career ===
McCook joined Eric Deans' Orchestra in 1943 after Deans selected him from the graduating class at the Alpha School. He spent several years playing in various groups, including Don Hitchman's sextet and Roy Coburn's Blu-Flames.

In 1954, he left for an engagement in Nassau, Bahamas, after which he ended up in Miami, Florida, and it was here that McCook first heard John Coltrane, a major influence on his playing. McCook would later call jazz his "first love" and additionally cite Coleman Hawkins, Sonny Rollins, Lester Young, and Ornette Coleman as influences.

McCook returned to Jamaica in early 1962, where he was approached by a few local producers to do some recordings. Eventually, he consented to record a jazz session for Clement "Coxsone" Dodd, which was issued on the album Jazz Jamaica. His first ska recording was an adaptation of Ernest Gold's "Exodus", recorded in November 1963 with musicians who would soon make up the Skatalites.

In 1968, he led Tommy McCook & The Supersonics, featuring bassist Jackie Jackson and drummer Paul Douglas, who would later become the rhythm section for Toots and the Maytals, when the era of reggae emerged from rocksteady.

During the 1960s and 1970s, McCook recorded with the majority of prominent reggae artists of the era, working particularly with producers Clement "Coxsone" Dodd as well as Bunny Lee, and his house band, The Aggrovators, as well as being featured prominently in the recordings of Yabby You and the Prophets (most notably on version sides and extended discomixes), all while still performing and recording with the variety of line ups under the Skatalites name.

McCook made a brief cameo in the film 1978 film Rockers. He was also part of the Rockers All Stars, the group responsible for the film's instrumental music.

After a heart attack in 1995, McCook temporarily withdrew from touring with the reformed Skatalites, a change which became permanent in 1996. He recorded on the band's albums through the mid-1990s until a triple-bypass surgery kept him from the Ball of Fire (1997) sessions.

McCook died of pneumonia and heart failure, aged 71, in Conyers, Georgia, on May 5, 1998. His funeral was held May 17 in Jamaica at the National Arena. Sister Mary Ignatius, who taught a young McCook at the Alpha Boys School, attended his funeral.

== Honors ==
On Hero's Day in 1975, McCook was honored for his contributions to Jamaica's music with the Order of Distinction at the Officer rank. The ceremony took place at King's House and his insignia was presented by Governor-General Florizel Glasspole. In 1997, The Slackers paid tribute to McCook with "Cooking for Tommy," an instrumental track on their album Redlight.

== Selected discography ==
- Top Secret (1969, Techniques)
- The Sannic Sounds Of Tommy McCook (1974, Micron Music Limited / South East Music Limited)
  - Released in the United Kingdom as Horny Dub (1976, Grounation)
- Reggae In Jazz (1976, Eve)
- Cookin' Shuffle (1995, Jamaica Authentic)
- The Authentic Ska Sound of Tommy McCook (1998, Moon Records)
- Down On Bond Street (1999, Trojan Records)
- Tommy's Last Stand (2001, Creole)
- Blazing Horns/Tenor In Roots (2003, Blood & Fire)
- Real Cool: The Jamaican King of the Saxophone '66-'77 (2005, Trojan Records)

With The Skatalites

- Tommy McCook & The Skatalites - The Skatalite! (1969, Treasure Island)

With Bobby Ellis

- Green Mango (1974, Attack)
- Blazing Horns (1977, Grove Music)

With The Aggrovators

- Brass Rockers (1975, Total Sounds)
  - Released in the United Kingdom as Cookin' (1975, Horse)
- King Tubby Meets The Aggrovators At Dub Station (1975, Live and Love)
- Super Star - Disco Rockers (1977, Weed Beat)
  - Released in the United Kingdom as Hot Lava (1977, Third World)
- Instrumental Reggae (1992, RAS)
- Show Case - 1975 (1997, Culture Press)

With Yabby You

- Yabby You Meets Tommy McCook In Dub (Peacemaker)
- Yabby You Meets Sly & Robie Along With Tommy McCook (Prophets)

With Herbie Mann

- Reggae (Atlantic, 1973)
- Reggae II (Atlantic, 1973 [1976])
