= Duke Reid =

Duke Reid CD
- Born: Arthur Reid; 21 July 1915; Portland, Jamaica
- Died: 1 January 1975 (aged 59)
- Genres: Ska; rocksteady; reggae
- Occupations: Record producer; DJ; record label owner
- Years active: 1953–1975
- Labels: Trojan; Duke Reid; Dutchess; Treasure Isle

Arthur "Duke" Reid CD (21 July 1915 – 1 January 1975) was a Jamaican record producer, DJ and record label owner.

He ran one of the most popular sound systems of the 1950s called Reid's Sound System, whilst Duke himself was known as The Trojan, possibly named after the British-made trucks used to transport the equipment. In the 1960s, Reid founded the record label Treasure Isle (named after his liquor store), which produced ska and rocksteady music. He was still active in the early 1970s, working with toaster U-Roy. He died in early 1975 after having suffered from a severe illness for the last year.

== Biography ==
Reid was born in Portland, Jamaica. After serving ten years as a Jamaican police officer, Reid left the force to help his wife Lucille run the family business, The Treasure Isle Grocery and Liquor Store at 33 Bond Street in Kingston.

He made his way into the music industry first as a sound system (outdoor mobile discothèque) owner, promoter and disc jockey in 1953. He quickly overtook Tom the Great Sebastian as the most popular sound system in Kingston. Soon he was also sponsor and presenter of a radio show, Treasure Isle Time. A jazz and blues man at heart, Reid chose "My Mother's Eyes" by Tab Smith as his theme tune. Other favourites of his included Fats Domino, a noticeable influence on the early Reid sound.

He began producing recordings in the late 1950s. Early Reid productions were recorded in studios owned by others, but when the family business moved from Pink Lane, Kingston to Bond Street, Reid set up his own studio above the store. He became proprietor of a number of labels, chiefly Treasure Isle and Dutchess (his spelling). Much of his income derived from licensing agreements with companies in the UK, some of which set up specialist Duke Reid labels. He was known to carry his pistols and rifle with him in the studio and would sometimes fire them to celebrate a successful audition.

He dominated the Jamaican music scene of the 1960s, specialising in ska and rocksteady, though his love of American jazz, blues and soul was evident. Reid had several things going for him that helped him to rise to prominence. He made a concerted effort to be in the studio as much as possible, something his counterparts did not do. He was known as a perfectionist and had a knack for adding symphonic sounds to his recordings and producing dense arrangements. Furthermore, his records were considerably longer than those being produced by his rivals. His tunes often broke the four-minute barrier, while most ska songs were barely longer than two minutes. The material that Treasure Island issued exemplified the cool and elegant feel of the rocksteady era. In an interview for Kool 97 FM, Jackie Jackson along with Paul Douglas and Radcliffe "Dougie" Bryan were asked about the many recordings they did together as the rhythm section for Treasure Isle Records, and working with Sonia Pottinger and Duke Reid.

Duke Reid made an impact with his presence at toasting battles, trying to out play other DJs. He was dressed in a long ermine cloak and a gilt crown on his head, with a pair of Colt 45s in cowboy holsters, a cartridge belt strapped across his chest and a loaded shotgun over his shoulder. It was not uncommon for things to get out of hand and it was said that Duke Reid would bring the crowd under control by firing his shotgun in the air.

Reid initially disliked ska for being too simple and having too much focus on drums rather than on guitar. However, he eventually got behind ska and produced numerous hits. Reid's ska productions in the 1960s "epitomized the absolute peak of the style", according to music historian Colin Larkin. He had a long string of hits with performers like Stranger Cole, the Techniques, Justin Hinds and the Dominoes, Alton Ellis and the Flames, the Paragons, the Jamaicans, and the Melodians.

Reid held a fierce, mutual professional rivalry with Coxsone Dodd starting in the late 1950s and through the 1960s. Reid's Trojan and Coxsone's Downbeat were the top two sound systems in Jamaica when active, and the competition extended to their Treasure Isle and Studio One labels, respectively. According to singer Brent Dowe of The Melodians, "When they were playing records, they were playing against each other... If you were singing for one, you couldn't go and sing for the other, or if you did you couldn't go back to the first one for a long time."

By the 1970s, Reid's poor health and the trend towards Rastafarian influenced roots reggae, noticeably reducing the number of releases from Treasure Isle. Reid forbade Rasta lyrics from being recorded in his studio and thus Coxsone Dodd was able to dominate the Jamaican recording industry. Reid maintained his high-profile largely by recording the "toasting" of DJs U-Roy and Dennis Alcapone as well as vaguely Rasta-influenced oddities such as Cynthia Richards' "Aily-I".

At around this time, Reid protégé Justin Hinds noticed his boss appeared unwell and recommended a doctor. Cancer was diagnosed and Reid decided to sell Treasure Isle to Sonia Pottinger, widow of his friend Lenford "Lennie the King" Pottinger and already owner of High Note Records, which was one of the largest record labels on the Island. He remained involved for a while acting as a Magistrate but died in 1975.

Reid was posthumously awarded the Order of Distinction in the rank of Commander on 15 October 2007.

== Partial discography ==
- Various Artists – Soul To Soul DJ's Choice – 1973 – Trojan Records (1995)
- Various Artists – Gems From Treasure Isle – 1966-1968 – Trojan Records (1982)
- Various Artists – Ba Ba Boom Duke Reid – 1967-1972 – Trojan Records (1994)
- Various Artists – Duke Reid's Treasure Chest – Heartbeat Records (1992)
- Various Artists – Treasure Isle Dub Vol 01
- Various Artists – Version Affair Vol 01 – Lagoon (1992)
- Various Artists – Version Affair Vol 02 – Lagoon (1993)
- Various Artists – Sir Coxsone & Duke Reid in Concert at Forresters Hall – Studio One
- Various Artists – The Treasure Isle Story (4-CD box set) – Trojan Records (2017)
