= Studio One (record label) =

Record label in Jamaica

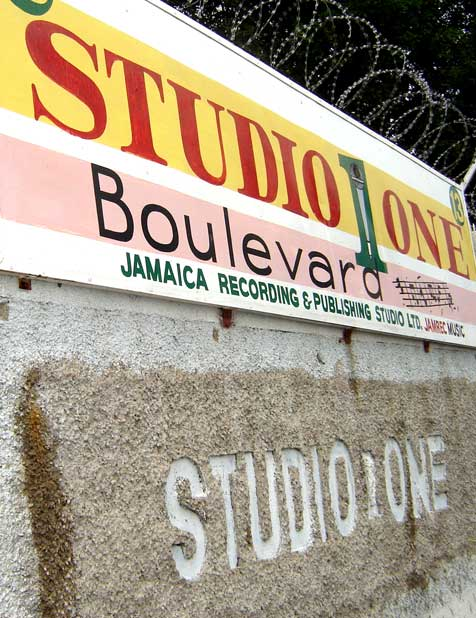
- Studio One sign on Studio One Boulevard (formerly Brentford Road), Kingston, Jamaica
- Founded: 1954
- Founder: Clement "Coxsone" Dodd
- Genre: Ska, rocksteady, reggae
- Country of origin: Jamaica

Studio One is one of Jamaica's most renowned record labels and recording studios; it has been described as the Motown of Jamaica. The record label was involved with most of the major music movements in Jamaica during the 1960s and 1970s, including ska, rocksteady, reggae, dub and dancehall.

== History ==
Studio One was founded by Clement "Coxsone" Dodd in 1954, and the first recordings were cut in 1963 on Brentford Road in Kingston. Amongst its earliest records were "Easy Snappin" by Theophilus Beckford, backed by Clue J & His Blues Blasters, and "This Man is Back" by trombonist Don Drummond. Dodd had previously issued music on a series of other labels, including World Disc, and had run Sir Coxsone the Downbeat, one of the largest and most reputable sound systems in the Kingston ghettos.

In the early 1960s, the house band providing backing for the vocalists were the Skatalites (1964–65), whose members (including Roland Alphonso, Don Drummond, Tommy McCook, Jackie Mittoo, Lester Sterling and Lloyd Brevett) were recruited from the Kingston jazz scene by Dodd. The Skatalites split up in 1965 after Drummond was jailed for murder, and Dodd formed new house band the Soul Brothers (1965–66), later named the Soul Vendors (1967) and Sound Dimension (1967-). From 1965 to 1968 they played 9 a.m. to 5 p.m., 5 days a week, 12 rhythms a day (about 60 rhythms a week) with Jackie Mittoo as music director, Brian Atkinson (1965–1968) on bass, Hux Brown on guitar, Harry Haughton (guitar), Joe Isaacs on drums (1966–1968), Denzel Laing on percussion, and on horns (some initially and some throughout): Roland Alphonso, Dennis 'Ska' Campbell, Bobby Ellis, Lester Sterling, among others on horns during the era of Rock Steady. Headley Bennett, Ernest Ranglin, Vin Gordon and Leroy Sibbles were included among a fluid line-up, to record tracks directed by Jackie Mittoo at Studio One from 1966-1968.

During the night hours at Studio One from 1965-1968, singers like Bob Marley, Burning Spear, The Heptones, The Ethiopians, Ken Boothe, Rita Marley, Marcia Griffiths, Judy Mowatt, Alton Ellis, Delroy Wilson, Bunny Wailer and Johnny Nash, among others, would put on headphones to sing lyrics to original tracks recorded by the Soul Brothers earlier each day. These seminal recordings included "Real Rock" (by Sound Dimension), "Heavy Rock", "Jamaica Underground", "Wakie Wakie", "Lemon Tree", "Hot Shot", "I'm Still In Love With You", "Dancing Mood", and "Creation Rebel".

The Soul Brothers, later known as Sound Dimension, recorded many of Studio One's most enduring instrumental rhythms, including "Real Rock", described by The New York Times as "the genre’s most often licked riddim." Jackie Mittoo, Joe Isaacs, and Brian Atkinson left Studio One in 1968 and moved to Canada.

Musicians associated with Studio One later described the label as an informal training ground where younger singers and players learned directly from established performers such as Jackie Mittoo and Leroy Sibbles. Horace Andy compared the atmosphere to "a college", recalling that artists often gathered at the studio even when they were not recording, observing sessions and learning from more experienced musicians.

As reggae became increasingly associated with Rastafari culture in the late 1960s, Studio One also became known for being more accommodating to Rastafarian musicians than many competing studios. Horace Andy noted that the studio's relative tolerance of cannabis use and Dodd's sympathetic attitude toward Rasta musicians contributed to its strong communal atmosphere and made it a preferred recording space for many singers and instrumentalists.

The studio was closed when Dodd relocated to New York City in the mid-1980s; he continued to run the label from his new base.

== Studio One artists ==
Studio One has recorded and released music by (and had a large hand in shaping the careers of) artists including:

- The Skatalites
- The Ethiopians
- Bob Marley and the Wailers
- Lee "Scratch" Perry
- Burning Spear
- Toots & the Maytals
- John Holt
- Horace Andy
- Ken Boothe
- Freddie McGregor
- Dennis Brown
- Jackie Mittoo
- Gladiators
- Michigan & Smiley
- Wailing Souls
- Dillinger
- Delroy Wilson
- Heptones
- Johnny Osbourne
- Marcia Griffiths (of the I-Threes)
- Sugar Minott
- The Abyssinians
- Culture
- Soul Vendors
- Lone Ranger
- Carlton and The Shoes
- Alton Ellis
- Willi Williams
- Judah Eskender Tafari

Noted rival Prince Buster began his career working for Dodd's sound system. In addition, record producer Harry J recorded many of his best-known releases at Studio One.

== See also ==
- List of record labels
- List of Jamaican record producers
