= Trojan Records =

British record label

- Parent company: Sanctuary Records Group (BMG Rights Management)
- Founded: 1968
- Founder: Lee Gopthal, Duke Reid, Chris Blackwell
- Distributors: Universal Music Group (physical); BMG Rights Management (digital)
- Genre: Ska; rocksteady; reggae; dub; dancehall; soul
- Country of origin: United Kingdom
- Official website: trojanrecords.com

Trojan Records is a British record label founded by Jamaican Duke Reid, Lee Gopthal and Chris Blackwell in 1968. It specialises in ska, rocksteady, reggae and dub music. The label currently operates under the Sanctuary Records Group. The name Trojan comes from the Croydon-built Trojan truck that was used as Duke Reid's sound system in Jamaica. The truck had "Duke Reid - The Trojan King of Sounds" painted on the sides, and the music played by Reid became known as the Trojan Sound.

The label had almost 30 hit singles in the UK singles chart between 1969 and 1976.

== History ==
Trojan Records was founded in 1968 when Lee Gopthal, who operated the Musicland record retail chain and owned Beat & Commercial Records, pooled his Jamaican music interests with those of Chris Blackwell's Island Records. Trojan was originally launched as an imprint for Duke Reid productions, with its first ten releases consisting entirely of Reid-produced material from Treasure Isle. Its debut release was "Judge Sympathy", performed by the Freedom Singers but credited on the label to Reid himself. Following the operational split between Gopthal and Blackwell in 1968, Gopthal reorganised Trojan as the flagship label of the company's reggae operations, while other producer-specific imprints such as Amalgamated Records, High Note and Treasure Isle functioned as subsidiary labels. Until 1975, Trojan was based at a warehouse in Neasden Lane, Willesden, London.

Trojan operated within a wider network of UK-based reggae labels that emerged in the late 1960s. Companies such as Graeme Goodall's Doctor Bird and the Palmer brothers' Pama Records also secured licensing deals with Jamaican producers, competing to distribute reggae recordings to the growing British market. Unlike many rival UK reggae labels, Trojan actively sought crossover success with mainstream audiences. Many Trojan/B&C releases were remixed or overdubbed with orchestration for the British market in an effort to make reggae recordings more accessible to mainstream pop listeners. On 15 November 1969, the British pop chart featured three Trojan/B&C singles in the Top 20 simultaneously: the Upsetters' "Return of Django", Jimmy Cliff's "Wonderful World, Beautiful People", and Harry J All Stars' "The Liquidator".

Trojan was instrumental in introducing reggae to a global audience and, by 1970, had secured a series of major UK chart hits. Between 1968 and 1972, reggae sales in the United Kingdom exceeded those in Jamaica. During 1970 alone, Trojan/B&C released approximately 500 singles across more than thirty labels, with sales exceeding two million copies.

Successful Trojan artists from this period include Judge Dread, Tony Tribe, Lee "Scratch" Perry's Upsetters, Bob and Marcia, Desmond Dekker, Jimmy Cliff, the Harry J All Stars, the Maytals, the Melodians, Nicky Thomas and Dave and Ansel Collins.

The bulk of the company's successes came via licences for Jamaican music supplied by producers such as Duke Reid, Harry Johnson and Leslie Kong. While the company's focus was firmly on the sale of 7” singles, it also launched a series of popular, budget-priced compilations such as Tighten Up, Club Reggae and Reggae Chartbusters.

According to music historian Lloyd Bradley, Trojan's pursuit of mainstream chart success increasingly distanced the label from its original audience during the early 1970s. As younger Black British listeners developed a growing interest in roots reggae, smaller labels such as Shelley's, Ethnic Fight, Ital Records, Burning Sounds and Different began catering to this market. Although Trojan attracted emerging British reggae acts, it continued to emphasise pop-oriented recordings, including reggae covers of contemporary soul and pop songs, rather than developing a distinctive British approach to roots reggae. Dennis Bovell recalled that his band Matumbi submitted a demo to Trojan in 1973 containing original compositions and a cover of Hot Chocolate's "Brother Louie", which the band had recorded as a joke. According to Bovell, Trojan rejected the original material but selected the cover for release as Matumbi's debut single.

In 1972, Chris Blackwell withdrew Island Records' interests in Trojan. By this time, the company was trying to broaden the appeal of reggae by re-mastering and overdubbing string arrangements on the original recordings. While the move initially paid dividends, the costs involved began to take their toll on the company's finances. Further financial difficulties arose when Charisma Records, whose releases were marketed and distributed by Trojan's parent company, B&C Records, secured a more favourable arrangement with a major record company. B&C was left with substantial property commitments, including premises in central London and Acton, while suppliers and other businesses withdrew credit. In 1975, B&C became insolvent and was sold for £32,000. Trojan's assets were acquired by Marcel Rodd's Saga Records, which had previously largely focused on releasing budget LPs.

In 1985, record collector and accountant Colin Newman purchased Trojan Records. Over the years that ensued, the company mainly concentrated on re-releasing much of its back catalogue, issuing numerous ska, rocksteady and reggae recordings. Among their most popular releases were the Trojan Box Set series, each featuring 50 songs on a three-CD (or vinyl record) set in a "clamshell" box. In addition, Trojan licensed reggae classics for a number of TV commercial campaigns, most notably for TDK, Adidas and the 2000 UEFA European Football Championship.

The Sanctuary Records Group purchased Trojan Records in 2001 and continued to focus on the label's back catalogue, under the general management of Laurence Cane-Honeysett. In 2002, Trojan's new owners acquired former UK rival record company, Creole Records, previously owned by Bruce White and Gary Himmelfarb's US-based RAS Records. In August 2007, Universal Music Group (UMG) had acquired 90% of Sanctuary Records after announcing in June a share offer that valued Sanctuary at $US87.68 million. In 2013, UMG sold their entire Sanctuary back catalogue including Trojan to BMG, as part of a divestment programme that was a mandatory condition set by EU regulators when UMG acquired EMI in 2012.

In 2018, the company celebrated 50 years in the business.

== Influence on skinheads ==
Trojan skinheads, influenced by traditional 1960s skinhead culture, are named after Trojan Records, to stress the influence of black Jamaican music and the rude boy style to the skinhead subculture. This designation emphasizes differences from the punk rock-influenced Oi! skinheads of the 1980s. The logo of Skinheads Against Racial Prejudice (SHARP) is based on the Trojan Records logo, although the Corinthian helmet is reversed to face the opposite direction. It was designed by Roddy Moreno of antifascist Oi! band The Oppressed. "I reversed the Trojan helmet because SHARP, in the plume, looked better that way."

== Collectable records ==
Over the years; as demand for many rare records has increased, a number of Trojan releases have become collector's items. For example, a 1969 single by The Slickers entitled "Run Fattie" sold for more than £300 in 2015. Other collectable records on Trojan that have sold for £200 or more include "Night Of Love" by Ansel Collins, "Wiggle Waggle" by The Wanderers, and "Hang 'Em High" by Richard Ace.

== Trojan subsidiary labels ==
- Amalgamated
- Attack
- Big
- Big Shot
- Blue Cat
- Bucket of What
- Bread
- Clandisc
- Down Town
- Duke
- Dynamic
- Explosion
- Gayfeet
- GG
- Green Door
- Harry J
- High Note
- Horse
- Hot Rod
- Jackpot
- Joe
- Moodisc
- Pressure Beat
- Q
- Randy's
- Smash
- Song Bird
- Summit
- Techniques
- Treasure Isle
- Upsetter
