= Lloyd Brevett =

Jamaican double bassist (1931–2012)

- Born: 1 August 1931; Kingston, Jamaica
- Origin: Jamaica
- Died: 3 May 2012 (aged 80) Saint Andrew Parish, Jamaica
- Genres: Ska, rocksteady, reggae
- Instrument: Double bass

Lloyd Brevett OD (1 August 1931 – 3 May 2012) was a Jamaican double bassist, songwriter, and a founding member of The Skatalites. He was a Rastafarian, and the uncle of The Melodians member, Tony Brevett.

== Biography ==
Born in Kingston, Jamaica, Brevett was a founding member in 1964 of the ska band The Skatalites.

He toured many countries with The Skatalites, and produced two Skatalites' albums, African Roots (1975) and The Legendary Skatalites (1976). He once stated, "Ska was our type of music that could lift the youth and make Jamaica known around the world".

Brevett was awarded the Order of Distinction by the Jamaican government in 1981, and the silver Musgrave Medal in October 2010. He toured and recorded with The Skatalites from the beginning of their reunion until 2004, when he was removed from the group after conflicts with newer members. Brevett toured briefly with his own band, and then retired to Jamaica in 2005.

On 3 May 2012, Brevett died at Andrews Memorial Hospital in St. Andrew, Jamaica at the age of 80. Brevett had suffered a stroke in March, two weeks after the fatal shooting of his son, Okine, one of ten children that he had. He was buried at May Pen Cemetery.
