= Coxsone Dodd =

Jamaican record producer (1932–2004)

Coxsone Dodd CD
- Dodd at Studio One, Brooklyn

Background information
- Also known as: Sir Coxsone
- Born: Clement Seymour Dodd; 26 January 1932; Kingston, Jamaica
- Died: 4 May 2004 (aged 72) Kingston, Jamaica
- Genres: Ska; rocksteady; reggae
- Occupation: Record producer
- Labels: Studio One; Coxsone; Tabernacle

Clement Seymour "Coxsone" Dodd (26 January 1932 – 4 May 2004) was a Jamaican record producer who was influential in the development of ska and reggae in the 1950s, 1960s and beyond.

He was nicknamed "Coxsone" at school due to his talent as a cricketer (his friends compared him to Alec Coxon, a member of the 1940s Yorkshire County Cricket Club team).

== Biography ==
The Kingston-born Dodd used to play records to the customers in his parents' shop. During a spell in the American South he became familiar with the rhythm and blues music popular there at the time. In 1954, back in Jamaica, he set up the Downbeat Sound System, being the owner of an amplifier, a turntable, and some US records, which he would import from New Orleans and Miami.

With the success of his sound system, and in a competitive environment, Dodd would make trips through the US looking for new tunes to attract the Jamaican public. While he did, his mother Doris Darlington would run the sound system and play the tunes. Dodd opened five different sound systems, each playing every night. To run his sound systems, Dodd appointed people such as Lee "Scratch" Perry, who was Dodd's right-hand man during his early career, U-Roy and Prince Buster. Perry would later leave Dodd in 1966 due to Perry feeling disrespected by Dodd. This is documented in the 1966 song "The Upsetter".

=== Recording career ===
When the R&B craze ended in the United States, Dodd and his rivals were forced to begin recording their own Jamaican music in order to meet the local demand for new music.

In 1959, he founded a record company called Worldisc. In 1962, he produced the jazz record "I Cover the Waterfront" on the Port-O-Jam label; two of the musicians who played on the album, Roland Alphonso and Don Drummond, became founding members of the Skatalites one year later. In 1963, he opened Studio One on Brentford Road, Kingston. It was the first black-owned recording studio in Jamaica. He held regular Sunday evening auditions in search of new talent, and it was here that Dodd auditioned Bob Marley, singing as a part of the Wailers.

In the early 1960s, Dodd was producing ska hits by Toots and the Maytals, the Gaylads, and the Skatalites.

Dodd's "You're Wondering Now", was initially recorded in 1964 by Andy & Joey in Jamaica and later covered by the Skatalites, the Specials and Amy Winehouse; it was also used as the theme tune for the British-French crime drama television series Death in Paradise.

During the late 1960s and 1970s, the "Studio One sound" was synonymous with the sound of ska, rocksteady and reggae, and Dodd attracted some of the Jamaican new musicians, including Burning Spear, Ras Michael, Delroy Wilson, Horace Andy, Sound Dimension, and Sugar Minott.

During the emergence of roots reggae in the early 1970s, Dodd was initially cautious about pursuing the style. Horace Andy, who recorded for Dodd during this period, later recalled that Dodd was sympathetic toward Rastafari and respected the Rastafarian musicians working at Studio One, but was hesitant to record roots material because there was little evidence that audiences wanted it. Andy believed Dodd was more comfortable recording his socially conscious material because he was already familiar with Andy's musical style.

In the mid-1980s, Dodd closed his studio and moved his base of operations to New York City.

== Honours ==
In 2002 he was awarded a Gold Musgrave Medal by the Institute of Jamaica.

== Last years and death ==
He continued to be active in the music industry into his seventies, and on 1 May 2004, Kingston's Brentford Road was renamed Studio One Boulevard in a ceremony which paid tribute to his accomplishments as a producer. He died suddenly of a heart attack three days later, aged 72, while working at Studio One. He was survived by his wife, Norma, who died in 2010.

Dodd was posthumously awarded the Order of Distinction, in the rank of Commander on 15 October 2007, for service to the Jamaica music industry.

== See also ==
- Calypso music
- Soca music
- Mento
