= The Best of the Wailers =

Studio album by the Wailers
- Released: August 1, 1971
- Recorded: May 1970
- Studio: Dynamic Sounds (Kingston, Jamaica)
- Genre: Reggae
- Length: 30:43
- Label: Beverley's
- Producer: Leslie Kong

The Wailers chronology
Soul Revolution Part II (1971)	The Best of the Wailers (1971)	Catch a Fire (1973)

Professional ratings
Review scores
Source	Rating
AllMusic	4/5 stars

The Best of the Wailers is the fourth studio album by the Wailers. Despite its title, it is not a compilation album. It was recorded in May 1970 but not released until August 1971. Over the years, the album was released and re-released under many titles, including Shakedown (or Shake Down), Soul Captives, Cheer Up, Roots I, Reggae!, In The Beginning... and more.

The album was produced by Leslie Kong, who died of a heart attack at the age of 37, a week after the album was released.

== Track listing ==
All songs written by Bob Marley, except where noted.

=== Original album (1971) ===
Side one
No.	Title	Writer(s)	Length
1.	"Soul Shakedown Party"		3:09
2.	"Stop the Train"	Peter Tosh	2:20
3.	"Caution"		2:43
4.	"Soul Captives"		2:03
5.	"Go Tell It on the Mountain"	Traditional	3:15

Side two
No.	Title	Writer(s)	Length
6.	"Can't You See"	Tosh	2:42
7.	"Soon Come"	Tosh	2:23
8.	"Cheer Up"		2:03
9.	"Back Out"		2:18
10.	"Do It Twice"		2:48

=== The Definitive Remastered edition (2004) ===
Current CD Version
No.	Title	Writer(s)	Length
1.	"Soul Shakedown Party"		3:09
2.	"Stop the Train"	Peter Tosh	2:20
3.	"Caution"		2:43
4.	"Soul Captives"		2:03
5.	"Go Tell It on the Mountain"	Traditional	3:15
6.	"Can't You See"	Tosh	2:42
7.	"Soon Come"	Tosh	2:23
8.	"Cheer Up"		2:03
9.	"Back Out"		2:18
10.	"Do It Twice"		2:48
11.	"Soon Come" (version)	Tosh	2:25
12.	"Soul Shakedown Party" (version)		3:05

== Personnel ==
The Wailers

- Bob Marley – vocals
- Peter Tosh – vocals, melodica
- Bunny Livingston – vocals

Additional musicians

Beverley's All Stars:

- Gladstone Anderson – piano
- Winston Wright – organ
- Paul Douglas – drums
- Jackie Jackson – bass
- Lloyd Parks – bass
- Lynford "Hux" Brown – guitar
- Radcliffe "Rad" Bryan – guitar
- Lynn Taitt – guitar

Production

- Leslie Kong – producer
- Warwick Lyn – producer
