= Paul Douglas (musician) =

Jamaican drummer (born c.1950)

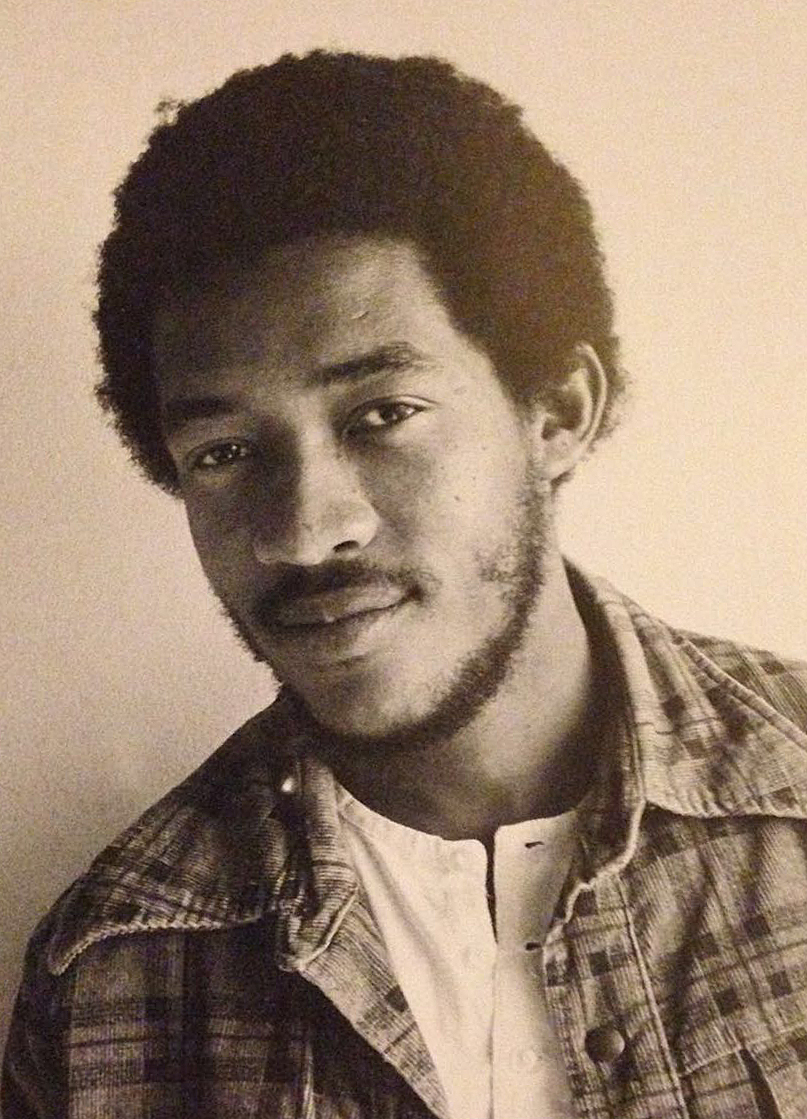
- Paul Douglas

Background information
- Born: 1950 (age 75–76); Saint Ann Parish, Jamaica
- Genres: Reggae, jazz
- Occupations: Drummer, percussionist
- Instrument: Drums
- Years active: 1965–present
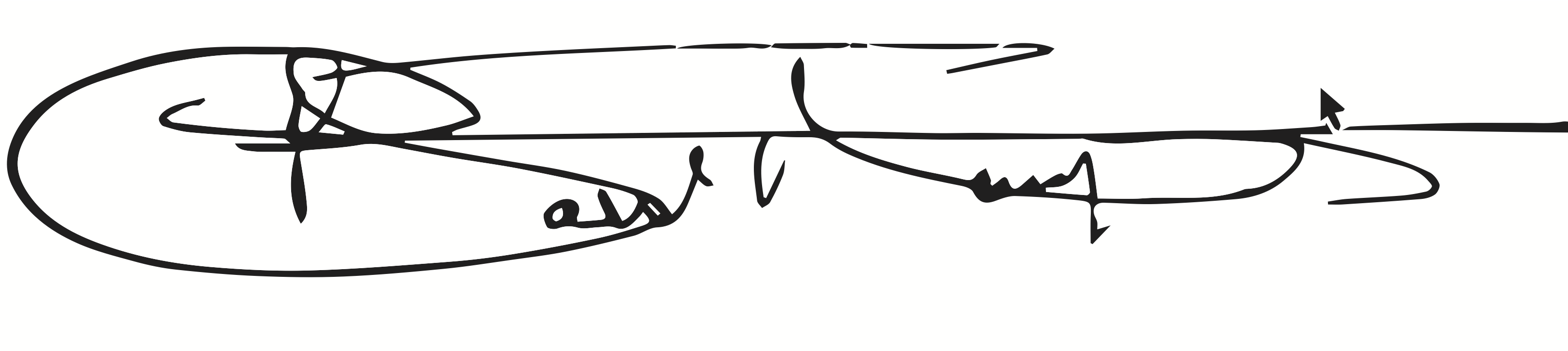
- Signature of Reggae drummer Paul Douglas

Paul Douglas (born c. 1950) is a Jamaican musician, best known for his work as the drummer, percussionist and bandleader of Toots and the Maytals. His career spans more than five decades as one of reggae's most recorded drummers. Music journalist and reggae historian David Katz wrote, "dependable drummer Paul Douglas played on countless reggae hits."

Douglas has worked with artists including Bob Marley and the Wailers, Bonnie Raitt, and Eric Gale. Douglas has also toured with artists including The Rolling Stones, Willie Nelson, Dave Matthews Band, The Who, Eagles and Sheryl Crow.

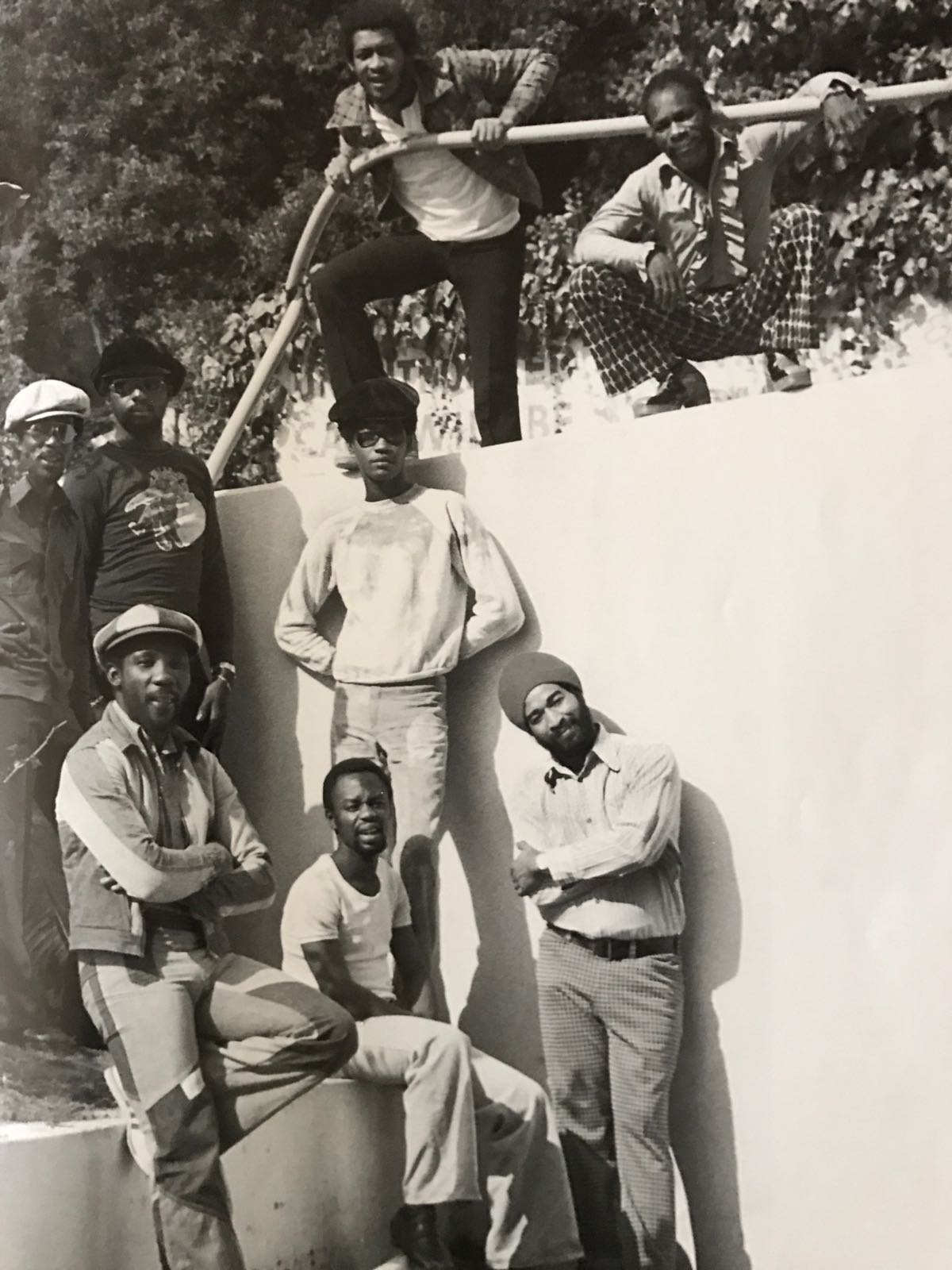
First generation of the band Toots and the Maytals to include instrumentalists. The line-up included its four main additional members Jackie Jackson, Paul Douglas, Hux Brown and Radcliffe "Dougie" Bryan.

== Early life ==
Paul Douglas was born in St. Ann, Jamaica. His career as a professional musician began in 1965 at the age of 15.

== Influences ==
Douglas' musical influences include Lloyd Knibb, Steve Gadd, Harvey Mason, Sonny Emory, Elvin Jones, William Kennedy, Carlos Santana, Bob Marley, John Coltrane, Sam Cooke, George Duke, Boris Gardiner, The Skatalites, Eric Gale, Leslie Butler, George Benson, Marvin Gaye, David Garibaldi, and David Sanborn.

== Affiliated groups ==
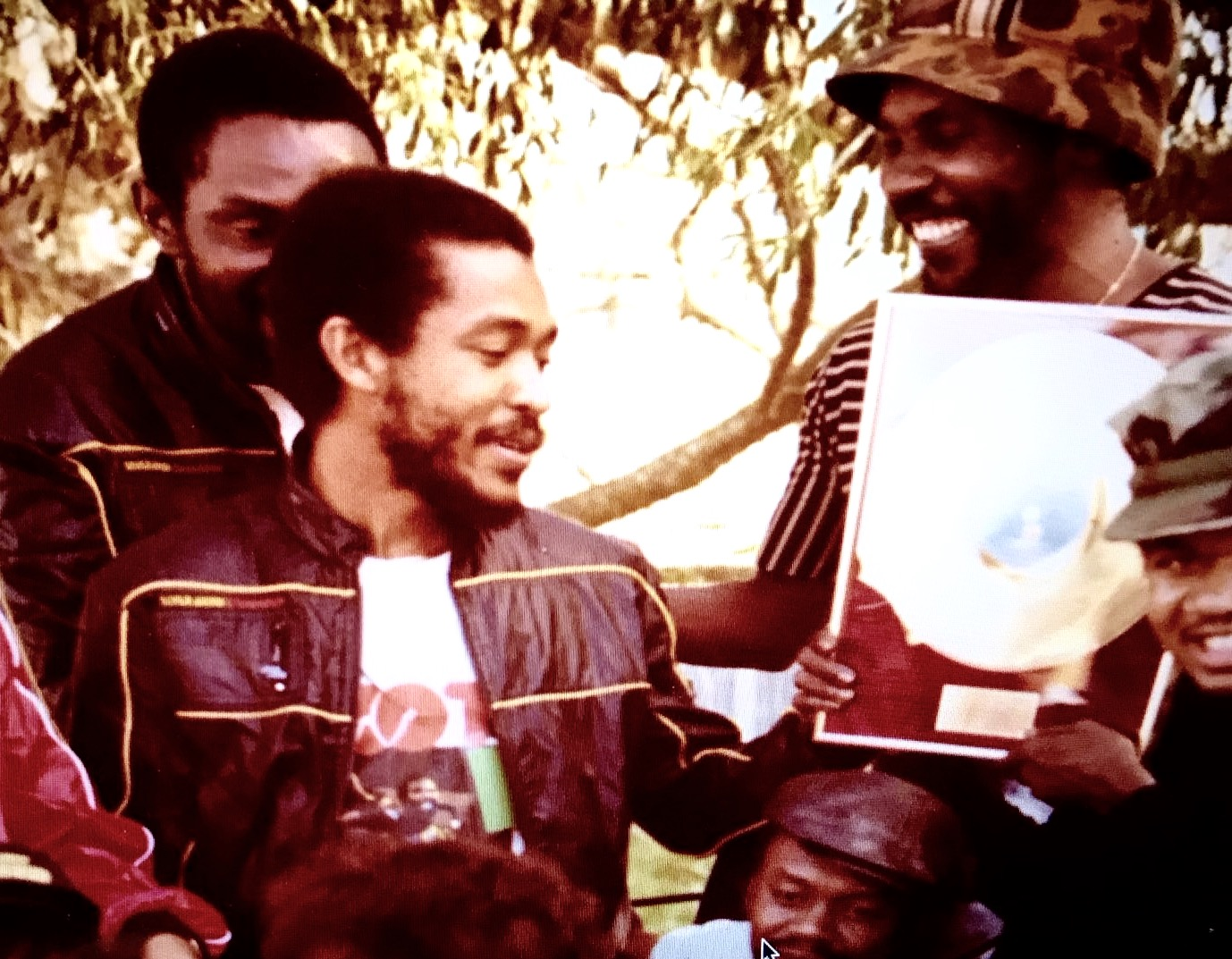
Paul Douglas accepting gold plaque in Australia 1982

While Douglas has maintained an active career as a studio musician for reggae, jazz, and funk artists since 1965, he has also been a member of several notable musical groups.

=== Toots and the Maytals ===
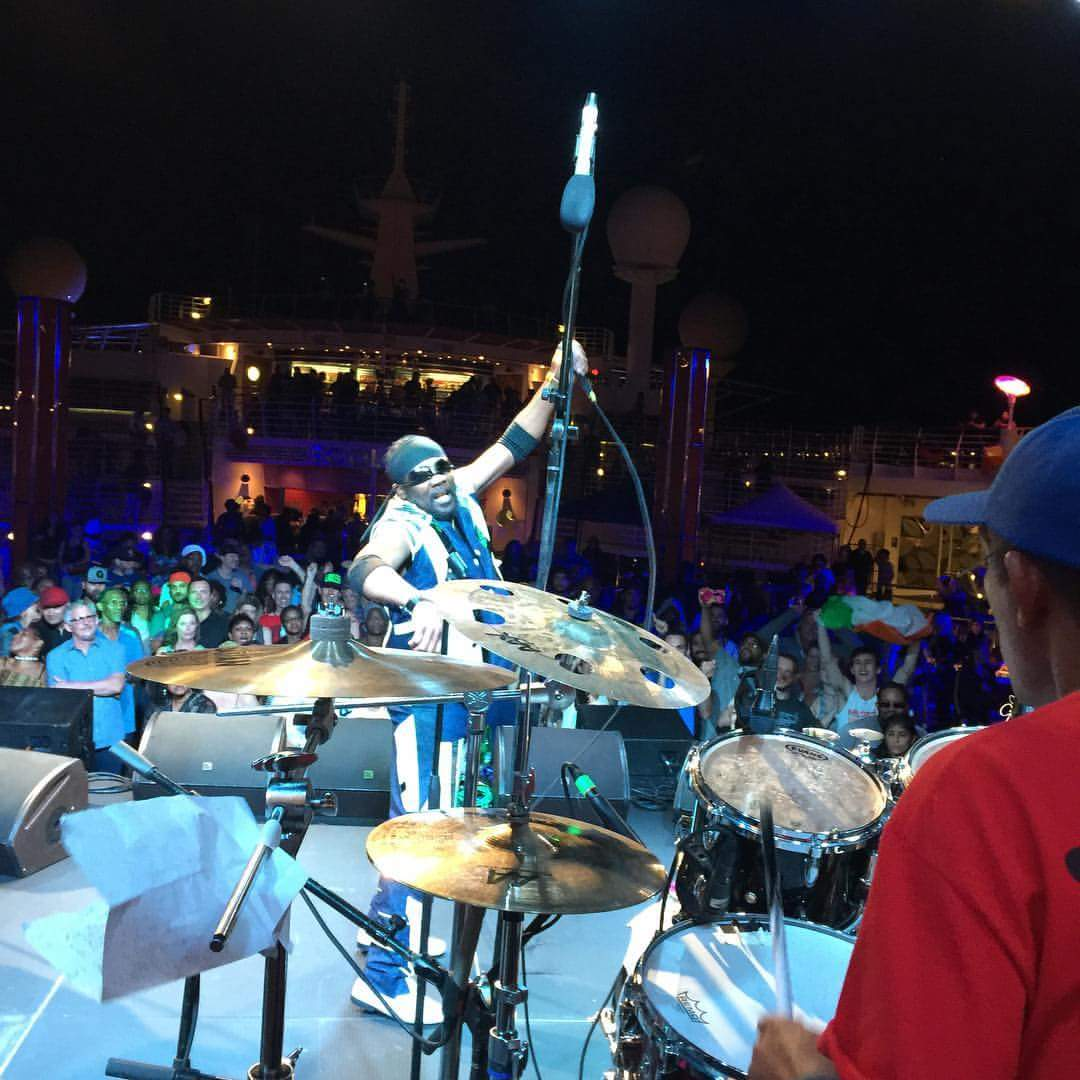
Toots Hibbert and Paul Douglas

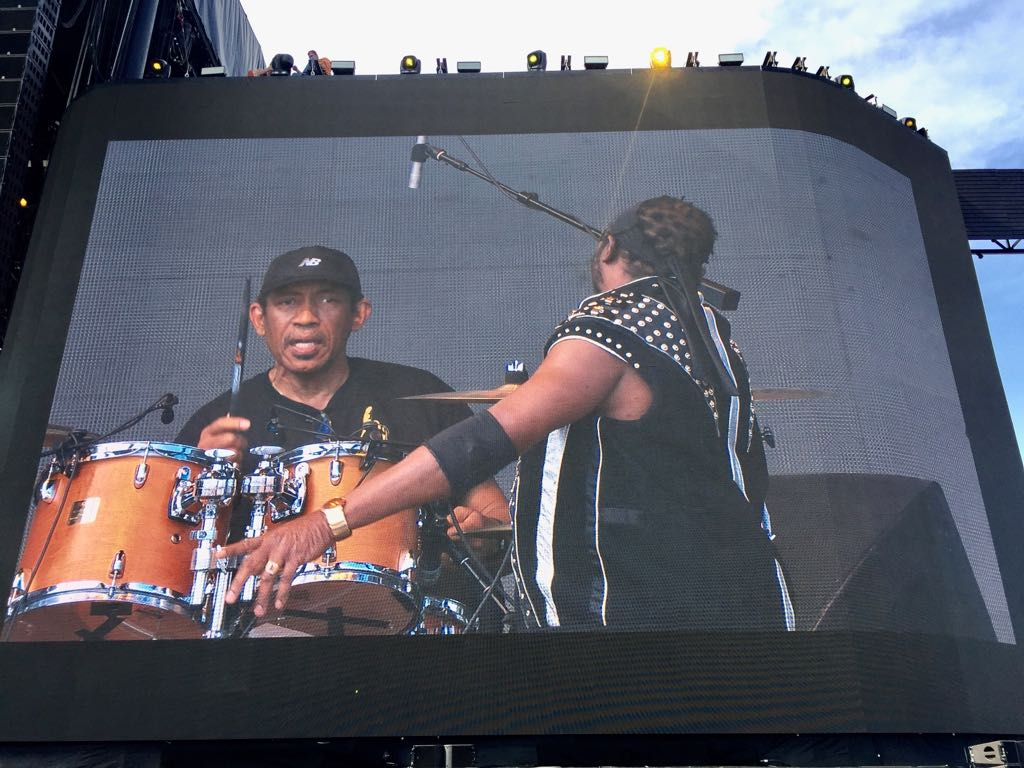
Toots and the Maytals performing at the 2017 Coachella festival

In 1969 Douglas joined Toots and the Maytals as a founding member of the band as it is known today, which up to that time had consisted of a vocal trio. Douglas has been the group's drummer, percussionist and bandleader from 1985 to the present day.

Excerpt from "The Rise of Reggae and the influence of Toots and the Maytals" by Matthew Sherman:

"...Reggae was born. Toots (Toots Hibbert) heralded the new sound with the seminal, complex groove monster "Do the Reggay"...Toots could do no wrong recording for Leslie Kong. With the consistent nucleus of musicians, the Beverley's All-Stars (Jackie Jackson, Winston Wright, Hux Brown, Rad Bryan, Paul Douglas and Winston Grennan) and the Maytals' brilliant harmonizing..."

Reggae is listed in the dictionary as:

reggae [reg-ey] (noun) - a style of Jamaican popular music blending blues, calypso, and rock-'n'-roll, characterized by a strong syncopated rhythm and lyrics of social protest. Origin of reggae: Jamaican English, respelling of reggay (introduced in the song "Do the Reggay" (1968) by Frederick "Toots" Hibbert).

Accompanied by Paul Douglas and Radcliffe "Dougie" Bryan in studio, Jackie Jackson explained the formation of the group in a radio interview for Kool 97 FM Jamaica:

"We're all original members of Toots and the Maytals band. First it was Toots and the Maytals, three guys: Toots, Raleigh, and Jerry. …And then they were signed to Island Records, Chris Blackwell. And we were their recording band. One day we were summoned to Chris' house. And he says, "Alright gentleman, I think it's time. Toots and the Maytals looks like it's going to be a big thing". By this time he had already signed Bob (Marley). So in his camp, Island Records, there was Toots and the Maytals / Bob Marley; we were talking about reggae is going international now. We kept on meeting and he (Blackwell) decided that the backing band that back all of the songs, the recording band, should be the Maytals band. So everything came under Toots and the Maytals. So we became Maytals also. And then we hit the road in 1975...we were the opening act for the Eagles, Linda Ronstadt, and Jackson Browne. We were the opening act for The Who for about two weeks."

Paul Douglas, Jackie Jackson and Radcliffe 'Dougie' Bryan are recognized as founding members who, along with frontman Toots Hibbert, continue to perform in the group to the present day.

The first Toots and the Maytals album released and distributed by Chris Blackwell's Island Records was Funky Kingston. Music critic Lester Bangs described the album in Stereo Review as "perfection, the most exciting and diversified set of reggae tunes by a single artist yet released." As Chris Blackwell says, "The Maytals were unlike anything else...sensational, raw and dynamic." Blackwell had a strong commitment to Toots and the Maytals, saying "I've known Toots longer than anybody – much longer than Bob (Marley). Toots is one of the purest human beings I've met in my life, pure almost to a fault."

"It was said that the Maytals were the Beatles to the Wailers' Rolling Stones." – Christopher Blackwell

In 1975, Toots and the Maytals traveled to Lagos, Nigeria for a concert at the National Stadium in front of over 60,000 fans. The group toured in Africa with Fela Kuti.

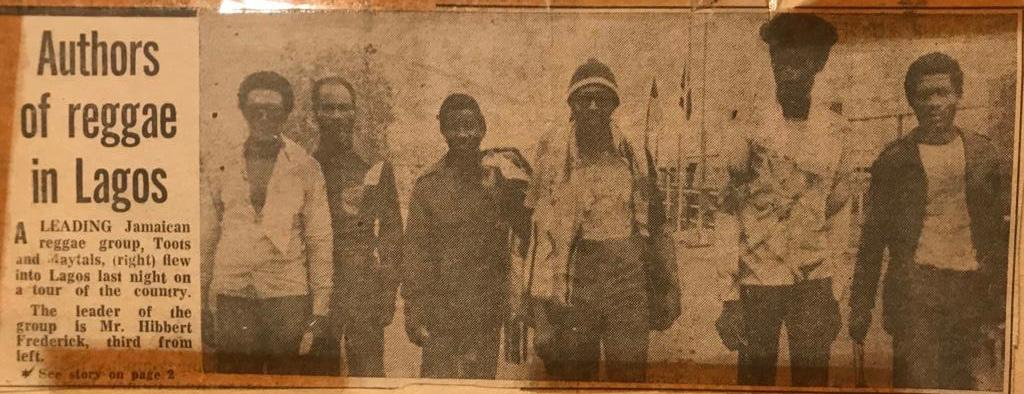
News clipping announcing the arrival of Toots and the Maytals in Lagos: "A leading Jamaican reggae group, Toots and the Maytals (right) flew into Lagos last night on a tour of the country."

On 1 October 1975, Toots and the Maytals were broadcast live on KMET-FM as they performed at The Roxy Theatre in Los Angeles. This broadcast was re-mastered and released as an album entitled "Sailin' On" via Klondike Records.

The Mainroom stage at Minneapolis landmark venue First Avenue, known as Prince's signature home club and the setting for 'Purple Rain', hosted Toots and The Maytals for recurring sold-out performances across multiple decades.

President Donald Trump was quoted as appreciating the reggae music of Toots and the Maytals when he said, "I heard the guest band, Toots & The Maytals, practising out on the set [of Saturday Night Live; Trump co-hosted an episode in April 2004]. They sounded terrific, and I went out to listen to them for a while. My daughter Ivanka had told me how great they were, and she was right. The music relaxed me, and surprisingly, I was not nervous."

In 2015, Vogue magazine listed the song "54-46 Was My Number" by Toots and the Maytals as one of their "15 Roots Reggae Songs You Should Know"; and in an interview with Patricia Chin of VP Records, Vogue listed the group as part of an abbreviated list of early "reggae royalty" that recorded at Studio 17 in Kingston, which included Bob Marley, Peter Tosh, Gregory Isaacs, Dennis Brown, Burning Spear, Toots and the Maytals, The Heptones, and Bunny Wailer.

In 2017, Toots and the Maytals became the second reggae-based group to ever perform at the Coachella festival, after Chronixx in 2016.

=== Bob Marley and the Wailers ===
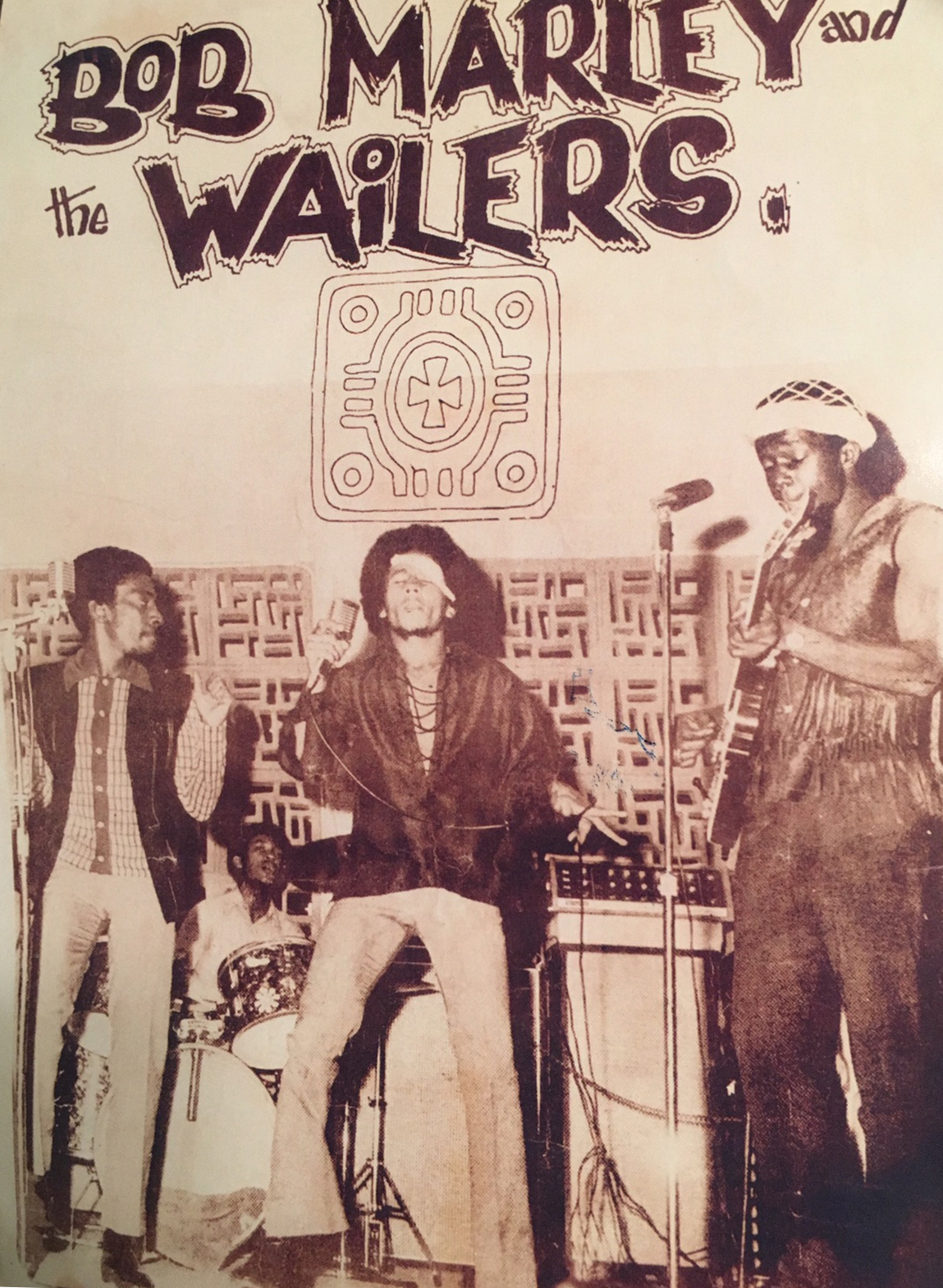
Paul Douglas with Bob Marley and the Wailers

Douglas contributed to several of Bob Marley's albums, including Small Axe and Soul Shakedown Party which were released on the Beverley's label, and performed live with Bob Marley and the Wailers in the early 70s. The Wailers worked with reggae producer Leslie Kong, who used his studio musicians called Beverley's All-Stars (Jackie Jackson, Paul Douglas, Gladstone Anderson, Winston Wright, Rad Bryan, Hux Brown) to record the songs that would be released as an album entitled The Best of The Wailers. The tracks included "Soul Shakedown Party," "Stop That Train," "Caution," "Go Tell It on the Mountain," "Soon Come," "Can't You See," "Soul Captives," "Cheer Up," "Back Out," and "Do It Twice".

Excerpt from an interview of Winston Grennan by Carter Van Pelt:

"...Chris Blackwell say, 'Yeah, Yeah, Yeah. I give them the money to make this record.' But at that time they was forming the band. Bob (Marley]) came to me, figure it was me, Gladdy, Winston Wright, Jackie and Hux to be the band. That was the band that Bob did really want, but those guys didn't want to get involved. You know that the situation around Bob was pretty hectic...They turned it down. So right away, I couldn't get involved, because I didn't want to leave the guys. We was doing all the sessions.

Robin Kenyatta came to Jamaica, we played for him. Garland Jeffreys, Paul Simon, Peter, Paul and Mary we play for them. The Rolling Stones came down we played for them. We were the guys... we could read music. If I leave, I feel it would be a bad vibes. When Hugh Malcolm joined the group, he couldn't keep up, so they got rid of him. A little later on a drummer came along name Paul Douglas, every so often we would bring him in, because I couldn't play on a session. Paul was about the only guy, that these other guys would trust to really come and play amongst them."

"The Perfect Beat" is a song on the album Eardrum from Talib Kweli that sampled a song from Bob Marley and the Wailers called, "Do It Twice", which is a drum beat from Paul Douglas.

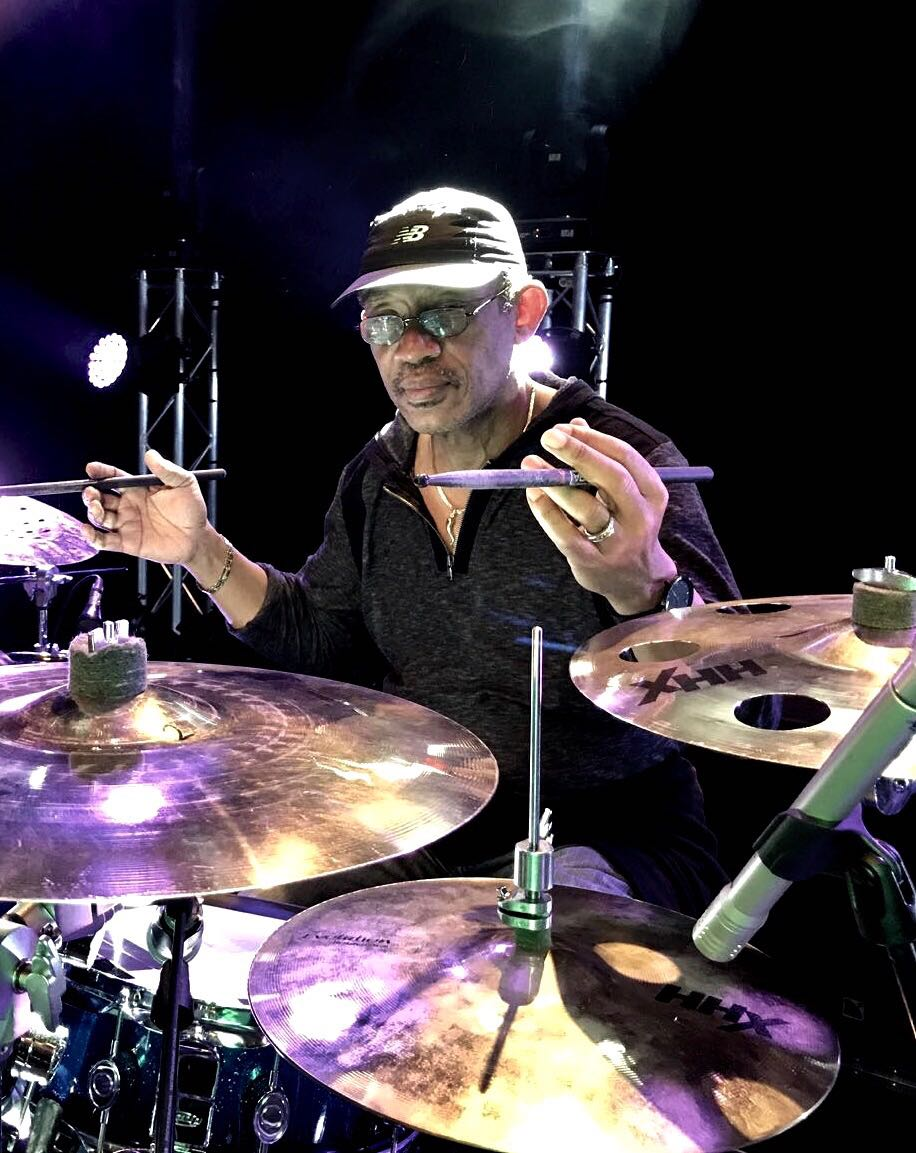
Paul Douglas performing with Toots and the Maytals in Grenoble, France (2017)

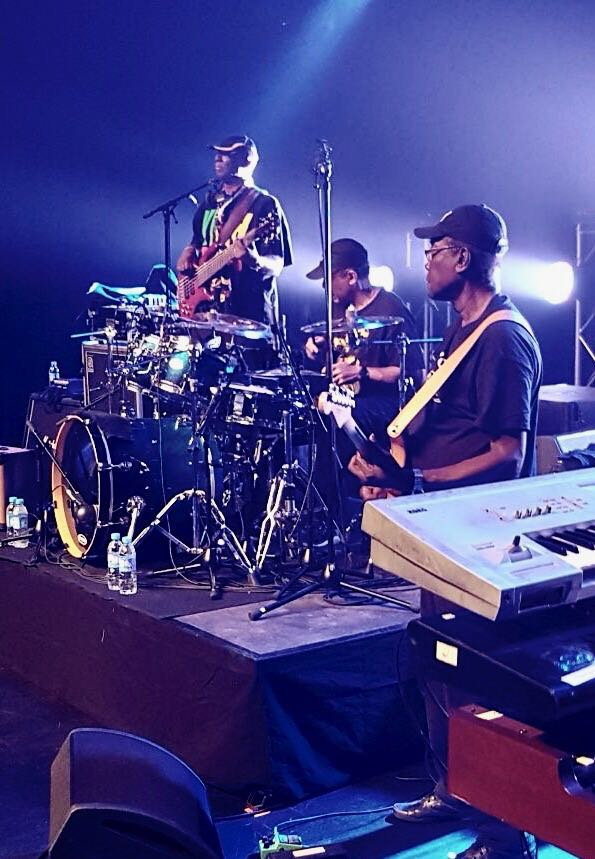
The original Maytals band members from Toots and the Maytals performing in Grenoble, France (2017)

=== Lee "Scratch" Perry and Leslie Kong ===
Excerpt from the book "People Funny Boy - The Genius Of Lee "Scratch" Perry by David Katz:

"On the instrumental front, Perry (Lee "Scratch" Perry) began more serious experimentation, exploring diverse influences and styles with a range of musicians. ...Perry also started working with Paul Douglas, an occasional Supersonics member and mainstay of Leslie Kong's productions."

=== Alton Ellis ===
Douglas is credited as the drummer on Alton Ellis' "Girl I've Got A Date". "Girl I've Got A Date" is recognized as one of the first songs to define the rocksteady genre.

=== Tommy McCook & The Supersonics ===
Douglas was a member of Tommy McCook & The Supersonics from 1968 - 1969, during which time the group released three LP's.

=== The Boris Gardiner Happening ===
Between 1970 - 1973 Douglas was the drummer for The Boris Gardiner Happening, completing five LP's with the group. The Boris Gardiner Happening recorded a version of "Ain't No Sunshine" in 1973 with Paul Douglas singing lead, and Boris Gardiner playing bass guitar, for the album Is What's Happening. Samples from this album were later used on the song "Wesley's Theory" from the Grammy nominated album To Pimp a Butterfly by Kendrick Lamar.

=== Leroy Sibbles ===
Douglas worked as a bandleader for the Leroy Sibbles band.

=== John Holt, The Pioneers, Eddy Grant ===
Douglas toured the UK with John Holt (singer) in 1974. This was the first major reggae tour that was accompanied by a major orchestra, a 15-piece orchestra out of England. The members of this tour included six veteran session musicians: Hux Brown (Guitar), Jackie Jackson (Bass), Paul Douglas (Drums), Rad Bryan (Guitar), Winston Wright (Organ), and Gladstone Anderson (Piano). Douglas also joined and played with The Pioneers band which featured Eddy Grant from The Equals that same year in England.

=== Byron Lee and the Dragonaires ===
In 1975 Douglas joined Byron Lee and the Dragonaires as a session musician, and later became a band member, as the group's drummer on the Sparrow Dragon Again LP.

=== Solo Work ===
In 2021, Douglas released a full-length solo album titled "Jazz Mi Reggae". The album features performances by fellow former Toots and the Maytals members Toots Hibbert, Charles Farquharson, Andy Bassford, Dougie Bryan, Carl Harvey, and Jackie Jackson. Other notable contributors on the album include Eddie Bullen, Willie Lindo, Bernie Pitters, Bob Marley and the Wailers keyboardist Tyrone Downie, Leslie Butler, Monty Alexander, Robby Lyn, Trevor Lopez, Juan Vasques, Keith Jones, Norris Webb, Mario Smith, AJ Brown and Richard "Ricky" Walters.

A second solo release, Jazz Mi Reggae Too, followed in 2022.

"That's What We Call You" (2024) On August 6, 2024, Paul Douglas released the single "That's What We Call You" on Jamaican Independence Day. The song is a tribute to Jamaica celebrating the island's influence on global culture and art.

The single features an ensemble of renowned Jamaican instrumentalists who have each played a pivotal role in popularizing the vibrant sounds of Jamaica on the world stage. Collaborators include:

- Monty Alexander
- Sly & Robbie
- Jackie Jackson
- Leslie Butler
- Paul Fakhourie
- Ricky Walters
- Tyrone Downie
- Willie Lindo
- Eddie Bullen

Italian music reviewer Andrea Mariano described the rhythm of That's What We Call You as 'shamanic,' adding; "The difference between someone who truly knows a genre and someone who merely imitates it is immense. Here, of course, we are in the first category."

"Ain't No Sunshine" Cover (2024) On December 18, 2024, Paul Douglas released a cover of the classic song Ain’t No Sunshine popularized by Bill Withers. The release combines Douglas’ original vocal recording from an early 1973 session with The Boris Gardiner Happening and a contemporary instrumental arrangement. The updated track showcases drumming by Paul Douglas himself, alongside reggae legends Sly Dunbar and the late Carlton Barrett.

== Touring ==
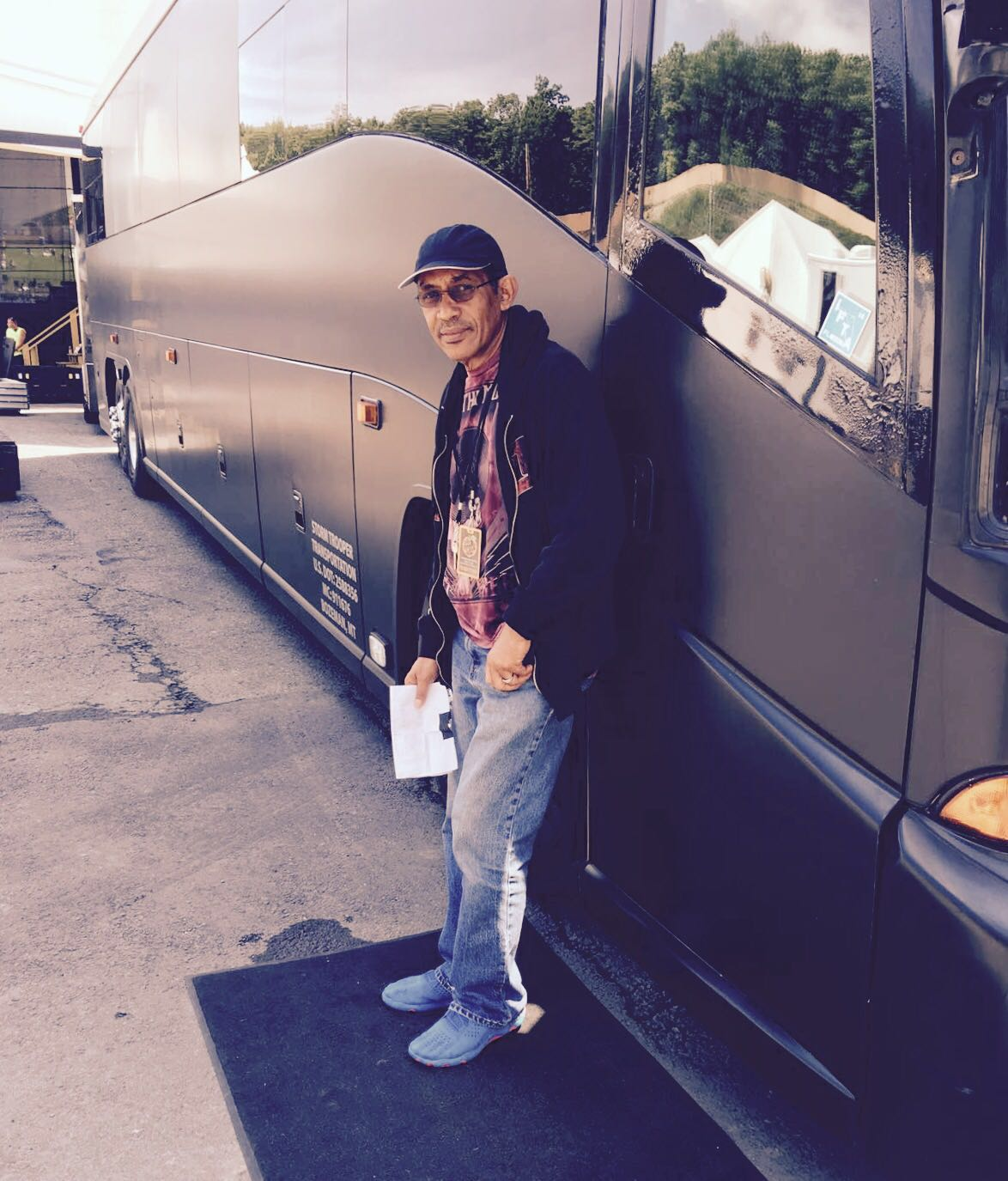
Paul Douglas, drummer and bandleader for Toots and the Maytals

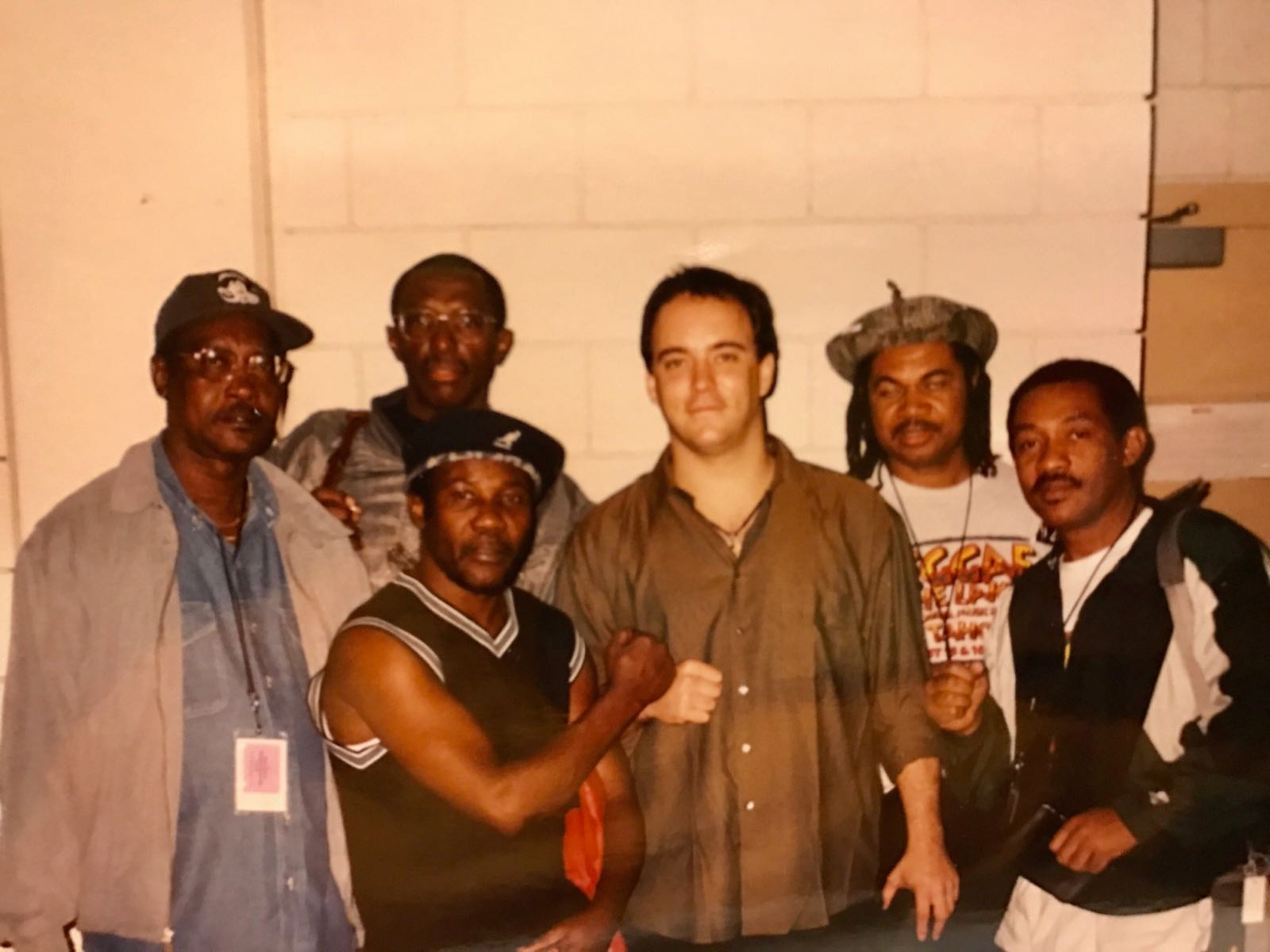
Toots and the Maytals with Dave Matthews when performing together in 1998

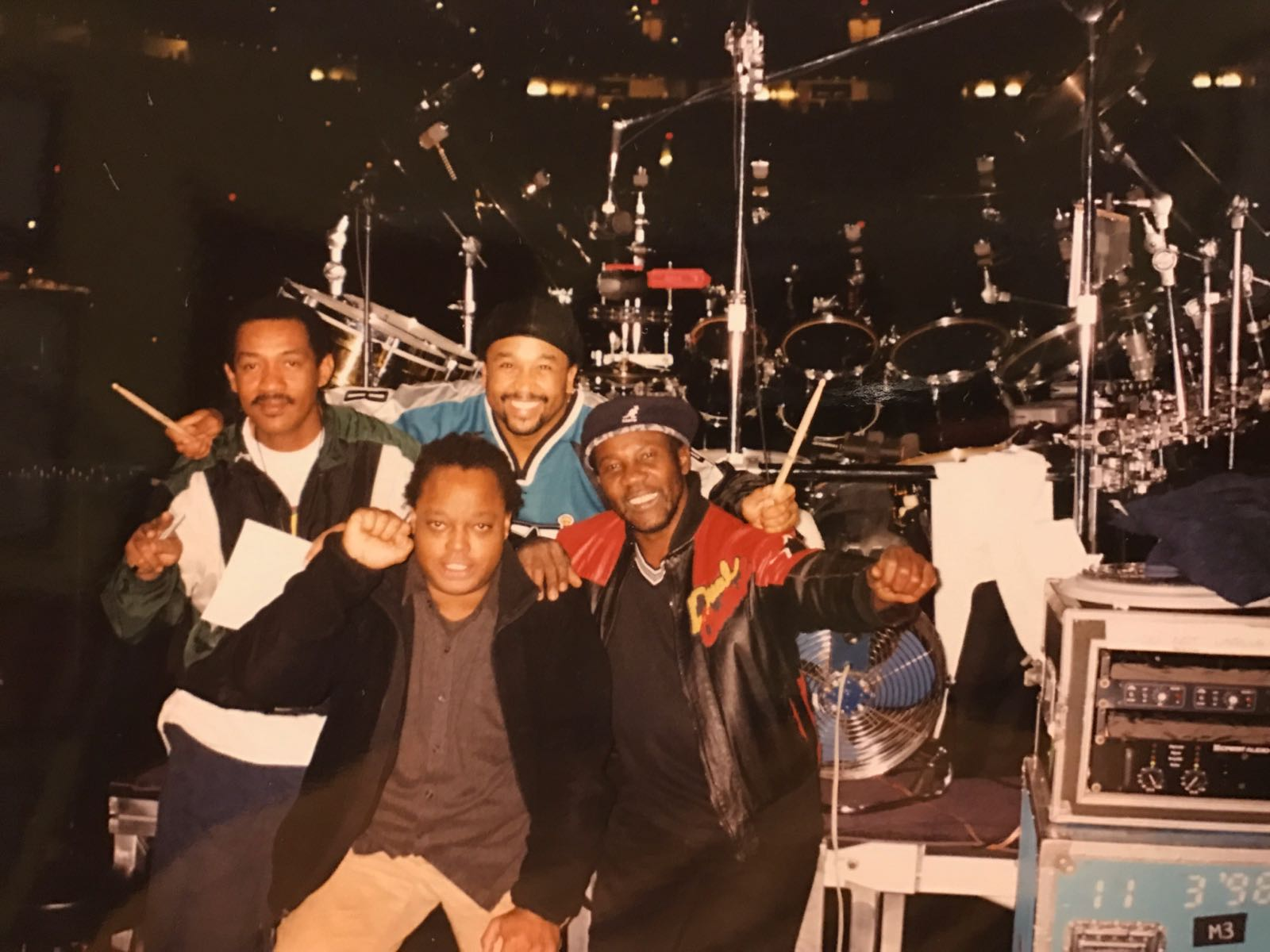
Members from Toots & the Maytals and Dave Matthews Band when performing together in 1998. Paul Douglas (left), Carter Beauford (back), LeRoi Moore (front), Toots Hibbert (right).

Douglas has toured with many artists over the course of his career, including:

- Toots and the Maytals
- Jackson Browne
- Linda Ronstadt
- Eagles
- The Who
- The Rolling Stones
- Dave Matthews Band
- The J. Geils Band
- Carlos Santana
- The Roots
- Sheryl Crow
- James Blunt

On 24 June 2017 at the Glastonbury Festival, reggae group Toots and the Maytals were slotted for 17:30 with BBC Four scheduled to show highlights from their set. When they did not show it was suspected they missed their time slot, and BBC broadcaster Mark Radcliffe apologized on their behalf stating, "If you were expecting Toots and the Maytals – and, frankly, we all were – it seems like they were on Jamaican time or something because they didn't make it to the site on time." The group credited with coining the term "reggae" in song was subsequently rescheduled by the Glastonbury Festival organizers giving them the midnight slot, with all other acts being shifted by one hour.

On 29 July 2017 Toots and The Maytals headlined the 35th anniversary of the WOMAD UK festival.

== Studio work ==
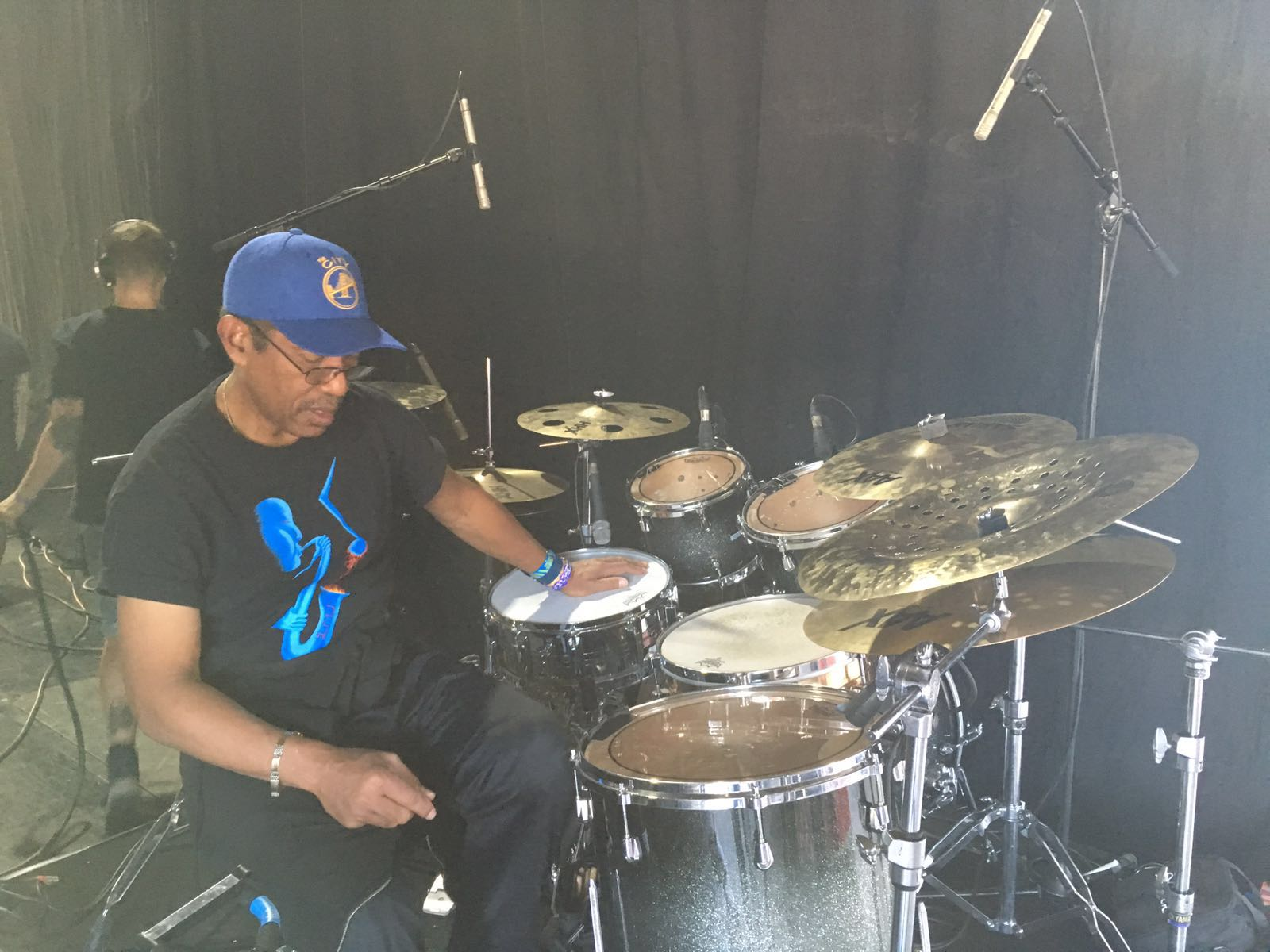
Paul Douglas, drummer and bandleader

Douglas' work as a session musician crosses several genres. His talent on the drums earned him recognition and respect from producers

Excerpt from an article on "Clancy Eccles":

"In the U.K. Trojan Records released Clancy (Eccles)'s productions...The finest musicians available were used, with the core of his regular session crew, The Dynamites, featuring the talents of Hux Brown (guitar), Clifton "Jackie" Jackson (bass), Gladstone Anderson (piano), Winston Wright (organ) and Paul Douglas (drums)."

In addition to recordings completed as a member of affiliated acts, Douglas' studio work includes sessions with:

- Trojan Records (Chalk Farm Studios London England)
- Beverley's All-Stars
- Federal Allstars
- Harry J Allstars
- Joe Gibbs Allstars
- The Upsetters
- Randy's
- Channel One Studios
- Derrick Harriot's Chariot
- Treasure Isle Records (Duke Reid)
- Prince Buster Allstars
- Bonnie Raitt
- The MG's
- Van McCoy
- Eddie Floyd
- Herbie Mann
- Cat Stevens (Dynamic Sounds Studio)

In an interview with Mikey Thompson on 27 November 2016 for Kool 97 FM, Jackie Jackson along with Paul Douglas and Radcliffe "Dougie" Bryan were asked about the many recordings they did together as the rhythm section for Treasure Isle Records, Beverley's Records, Channel One Studios and Federal Records. In addition to work mentioned with Sonia Pottinger, Duke Reid, Lynn Taitt, Delroy Wilson, and Lee "Scratch" Perry, they were interviewed about working on the following songs:

- Bob Marley and the Wailers - "Nice Time", "Hypocrites", "Thank You Lord", "Bus Dam Shut", "Can't You See" and "Small Axe"
- Phyllis Dillon - "Don't Stay Away" and "Perfidia"
- The Melodians - "Little Nut Tree", "Swing and Dine", "Sweet Sensation", and "Rivers of Babylon"
- U-Roy & The Melodians - "Version Galore"
- Bob Andy - "Fire Burning"
- Ken Boothe - "Everything I Own", "Say You", and "Freedom Street"
- The Gaylads - "It's Hard To Confess" and "There's A Fire"
- Hopeton Lewis - "Take It Easy"
- Winston Wright - "Stealing Vol. II" from "Greater Jamaica (Moon Walk-Reggay)"
- Ernie Smith - "Duppy or Gunman"
- Desmond Dekker - "Israelites"
- Desmond Dekker and the Aces - "Intensified"
- Roy Shirley - "Hold Them"
- Errol Dunkley - "You're Gonna Need Me"
- The Congos - "Fisherman"
- John Holt & The Paragons - "Only A Smile", "Wear You To The Ball", "Ali Baba", "I've Got To Get Away", and "You Mean The World To Me"
- Toots and the Maytals - "Monkey Man", "Pomps & Pride", "Scare Him" and "Pressure Drop"

In a 2017 Reggaeville interview with Sly Dunbar of Sly & Robbie, when asked "who do you think played the prototypes of the reggae beat?", Dunbar remarked of Paul Douglas: "He played a lot for Treasure Isle. He played with Lloyd Charmers on Everything I Own by Ken Boothe. He played on Everybody Bawling and a whole heap of tunes. He played for the Maytals too. And he played on some Beverley's songs too like Freedom Street by Ken Boothe. Paul Douglas. Wicked drummer. Bad bad drummer."

== Notable televised performances ==
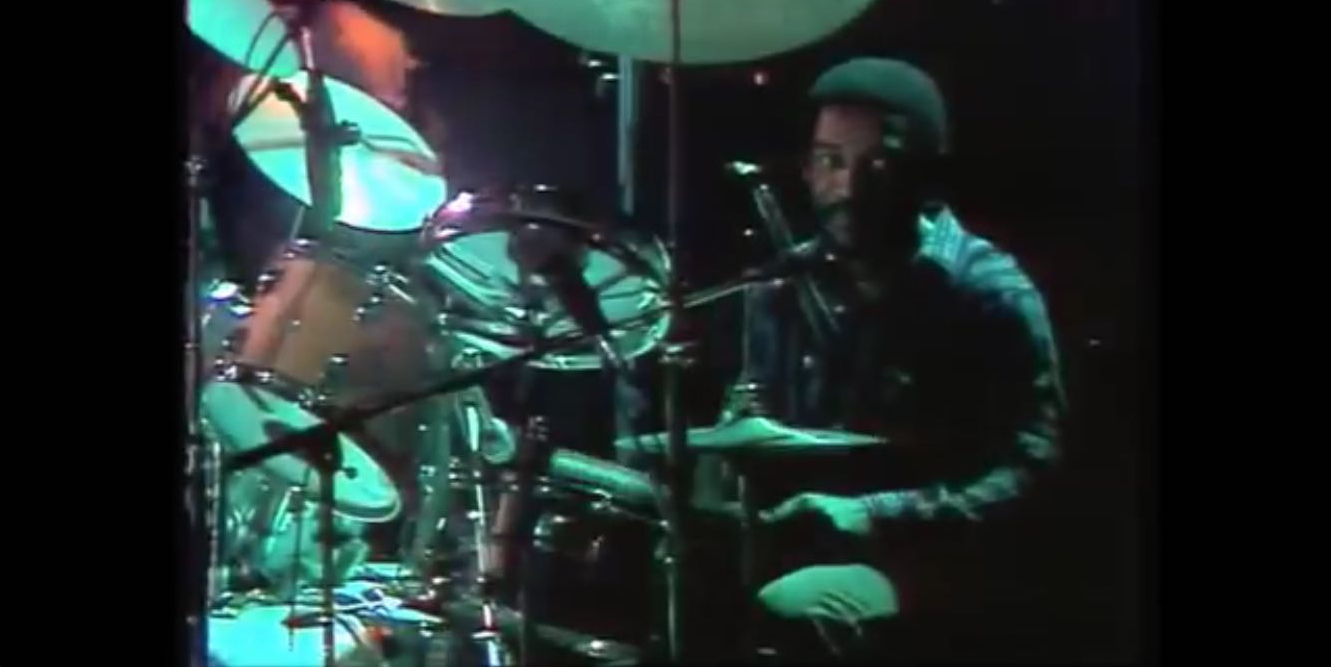
Paul Douglas

- 1990 VH1 New Visions World Beat hosted by Nile Rodgers
- 2001 Late Night with Conan O'Brien
- 2004 The Tonight Show with Jay Leno featuring Bonnie Raitt & Toots and the Maytals
- 2004 Saturday Night Live
- "Last Call with Carson Daly". Last Call with Carson Daly. 29 September 2004. NBC.
- 2004 Later... with Jools Holland
- 2010 Late Night with Jimmy Fallon
- "New Year's Eve Live". New Year's Eve with Carson Daly. 31 December 2011. NBC.
- "A Song Call Marley". The Tonight Show Starring Jimmy Fallon. 25 July 2018. NBC.
- 2018 The Tonight Show Starring Jimmy Fallon

== Film ==
In 2011, Douglas was part of the documentary released by Director George Scott and Producer Nick De Grunwald called Reggae Got Soul: The Story of Toots and the Maytals which was featured on BBC Television. Described as "The untold story of one of the most influential artists ever to come out of Jamaica", it features appearances by Marcia Griffiths, Jimmy Cliff, Bonnie Raitt, Eric Clapton, Keith Richards, Willie Nelson, Anthony DeCurtis, Ziggy Marley, Chris Blackwell, Paolo Nutini, Sly Dunbar, and Robbie Shakespeare.

== Awards and recognition ==
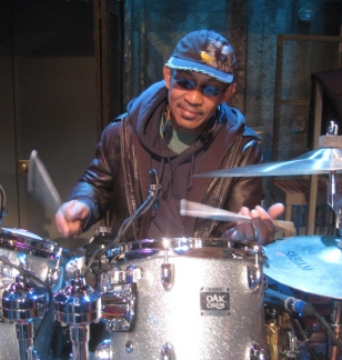
Paul Douglas

- 1981 Grammy Award Nomination for Toots Live!
- 1989 Grammy Award Nomination for Best Reggae Album of the Year: Toots in Memphis
- 1991 Grammy Award Nomination for Best Reggae Album of the Year: Toots & the Maytals – An Hour Live
- 1997 Canadian Reggae Music Awards
- 1998 Canadian Reggae Music Awards
- 1998 Grammy Award Nomination for Best Reggae Album of the Year: Toots & the Maytals – Ska Father
- 2004 Grammy Award Winner for Best Reggae Album of the Year: Toots & the Maytals - True Love
- 2008 Grammy Award Nomination for Best Reggae Album of the Year: Toots & the Maytals – Light Your Light
- 2013 Grammy Award Nomination for Best Reggae Album of the Year: Toots & The Maytals – Reggae Got Soul: Unplugged on Strawberry Hill
- 2019: Featured on Barack Obama's annual Summer Playlist for the track "54-46 Was My Number".
- 2020 Grammy Award Winner for Best Reggae Album of the Year: Got To Be Tough
- 2021 Named one of Drummerworld's 'Top 500 Drummers'
- 2023: Featured on Barack Obama's annual Summer Playlist for the track "Funky Kingston".

== Interviews ==
In an interview with Batterie Magazine for their 2017 September/October edition, Douglas was asked about his work as the main drummer and musical director for Toots and the Maytals, in addition to being called upon by artists and producers such as Bob Marley, Lee Scratch Perry, Eric Gale, Ken Boothe, The Congos and Delroy Wilson. In the interview, Douglas explains one of his heroes to be Lloyd Knibb of The Skatalites, as well as being influenced my musicians such as George Benson, Carlos Santana, John Coltrane, Sam Cooke, and David Sanborn. On 10 September 2021 Paul Douglas was the featured guest for series 3 episode 6 of The 212 Podcast. On 13 April 2023 Paul Douglas was one of the featured guests on the Mubi Podcast's episode "MUBI Podcast: "The Harder They Come"—Reggae Catches Fire on Film".

Rolling Stone Feature: Paul Douglas was featured in the November 2024 issue of Rolling Stone Argentina, which highlighted his career and contributions as the "unsung hero of reggae." The article discusses his pivotal role in shaping the reggae sound alongside icons such as Bob Marley.

BBC Podcast Series – Eras: In 2025, Douglas appeared in the BBC podcast series Eras. This season focused on Bob Marley's music and legacy, with Douglas discussing his career and his contributions to Marley's recordings. Previous seasons of the podcast have featured artists like Sting, The Beatles, ABBA, and Kylie Minogue.

== Museums and expositions ==
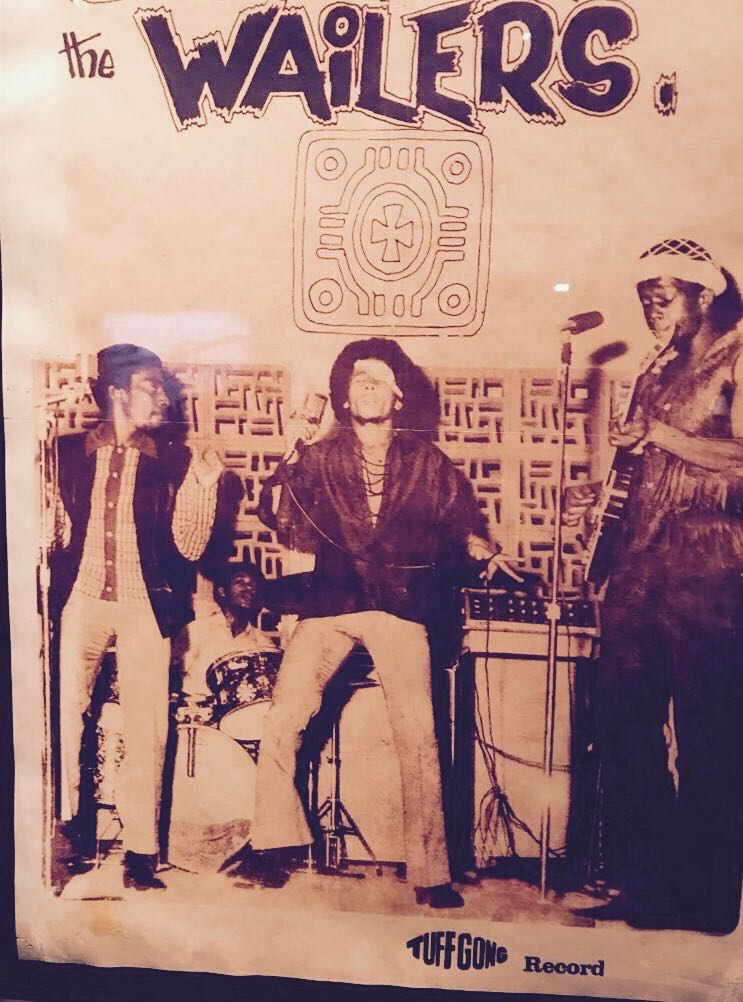
Philharmonie de Paris - The Wailers

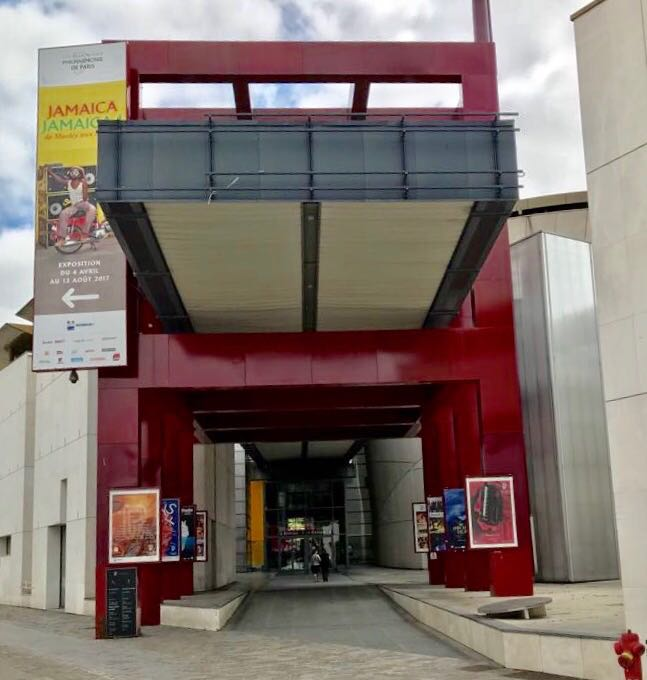
Philharmonie de Paris

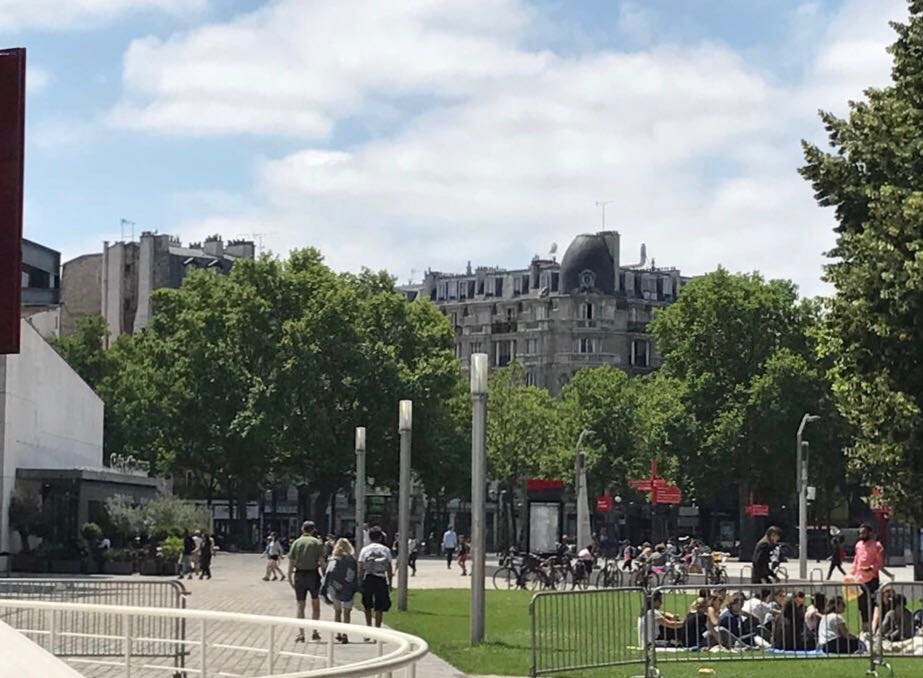
Philharmonie de Paris

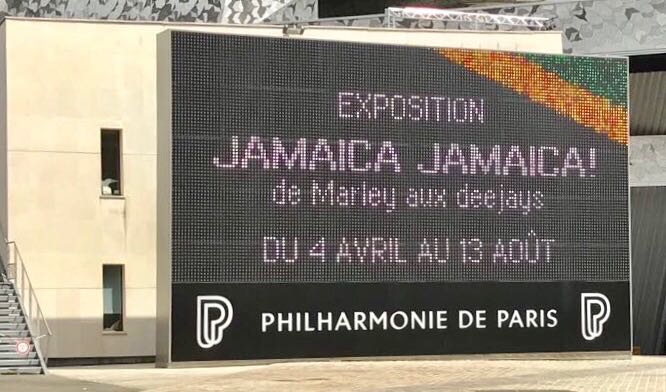
Philharmonie de Paris - Jamaica Jamaica!

From April 2017 to August 2017, Douglas is part of the Exposition Jamaica Jamaica ! at the Philharmonie de Paris in France. Douglas is featured on the poster displayed at the exposition showing the early formation of Bob Marley & The Wailers on the Tuff Gong record label, and he is additionally part of the exposition as a member of Toots and the Maytals for their importance in the development of reggae music.

== Discography ==
Paul Douglas is credited on over 250 works. In 2021 he released a full-length solo album titled "Jazz Mi Reggae".

- Toots & The Maytals (1965) The Sensational Maytals
- Toots & The Maytals & Prince Buster's All Stars (1965) Dog War / Little Flea (Prince Buster)
- Toots & The Maytals (1966) Never Grow Old, (Studio One)
- Toots & The Maytals (1966) Life Could Be A Dream
- Toots & The Maytals (1968) Sweet and Dandy, (Beverley's Records)
- Tommy McCook & The Supersonics (1968) Mary Poppins
- King Stitt (1969) Herdsman Shuffle
- King Stitt (1969) Lee Van Cleef
- The Maytals (1969) Sweet And Dandy / Oh - Yea (7") (Beverley's Records)
- Toots & The Maytals (1969) Monkey Man
- Tommy McCook & The Supersonics (1969) Red Ash
- Tommy McCook & The Supersonics (1969) Tribute to Rameses
- King Stitt & The Dynamites (1969) Vigorton 2
- The Melodians (1970) Everybody Bawling
- Ken Boothe (1970) Freedom Street
- Clancy Eccles And The Dynamites (1970) Herbsman Reggae
- Boris Gardiner (1970) Reggae Happening
- Delano Stewart (1970) Stay A Little Bit Longer
- The Melodians (1970) Sweet Sensation
- Delano Stewart (1970) That's Life
- The Gaylads (1970) There's A Fire
- Bob and Marcia (1970) Young Gifted and Black
- Toots & The Maytals (1970) Feel Alright (7") (Beverley's Records)
- Bob Marley & The Wailers (1970) Baby Baby Come Home
- Bob Marley & The Wailers (1970) Sophisticated Psychedelication
- Bob Marley & The Wailers (1971) Soul Shakedown Party
- Bob Marley & The Wailers (1971) The Best of the Wailers
- Toots & The Maytals (1971) Bam-Bam / Pomps And Pride (7") (Dynamic Sounds)
- Boris Gardiner (1971) Soulful Experience
- Toots & The Maytals (1971) Greatest Hits (Beverley Records)
- Toots & The Maytals (1972) The Harder They Come, (Island)
- Toots & The Maytals (1972) Slatyam Stoot
- Toots & The Maytals (1972) Daddy / It Was Written Down (Jaguar)
- Toots & The Maytals (1972) Pomps And Pride (Jaguar)
- Toots & The Maytals (1972) Country Road / "Louie Louie" (Jaguar)
- Toots & The Maytals (1972) Louie Louie / Pressure Drop '72 (Trojan Records)
- Boris Gardiner (1972) For All We Know
- The Boris Gardiner Happening (1973) Is What's Happening
- Toots & The Maytals (1973) Sit Right Down (Dragon)
- Toots & The Maytals (1973) Country Road / Funky Kingston (Dragon)
- Toots & The Maytals (1973) In The Dark / Sailing On (Jaguar)
- Jimmy Cliff / Toots & The Maytals (1973) You Can Get It If You Really Want / Sweet & Dandy (Mango)
- Toots & The Maytals (1973) Screwface Underground (Jaguar)
- Toots & The Maytals (1973) Daddy (7", Single) (Blue Mountain)
- Toots & The Maytals (1973) Country Road (Island Records)
- Toots & The Maytals (1973) From the Roots, (Trojan)
- Toots & The Maytals (1973) Funky Kingston, (Trojan)
- Toots & The Maytals (1973) The Original Golden Oldies Vol.3
- Vic Taylor (1973) Reflections
- Ernie Smith (1974) Duppy Gunman
- Ken Boothe (1974) Everything I Own
- Toots & The Maytals (1974) In the Dark, (Dragon Records)
- Toots & The Maytals (1974) Who Knows Better (Hot Shot!)
- Toots & The Maytals (1974) Time Tough (Jaguar)
- Toots & The Maytals (1974) I Can't Believe / 5446 Instrumental (Starapple)
- Toots & The Maytals (1974) Sailing On / If You Act This Way (7") (Dragon)
- Toots & The Maytals (1974) You Don't Love Me (So Bad) (7", Single) (Jaguar)
- Bob Andy (1974) Fire Burning
- Fr. Richard HoLung, Harrison & Friends (1974) Letters Job To John
- Toots & The Maytals (1975) Reggae's Got Soul (Jaguar)
- Susan Cadogan (1975) Hurts So Good
- Horace Forbes (1975) Impossible<
- Faith D'Aguilar (1975) Jamaica
- Eric Gale (1975) Negril
- Pluto Shervington (1975) Pluto
- Byron Lee And The Dragonaires & Mighty Sparrow (1975) Sparrow Dragon Again
- Johnny Nash (1975) Tears On My Pillow
- Ken Boothe (1976) Blood Brothers
- Pluto Shervington (1976) Dat
- R.D. Livingstone (1976) Home From Home
- Errol Brown (1976) Pleasure Dub
- Pluto Shervington (1976) Ram Goat Liver
- Toots & The Maytals (1976) Reggae Got Soul (Island)
- King Tubby & Clancy Eccles All Stars (1976) Sound System International Dub LP
- Funky Brown (1976) These Songs Will Last Forever
- Bob Marley & The Wailers / Toots & The Maytals (1976) Trenchtown Rock / Reggae Got Soul (7") (Island Records)
- Toots & The Maytals (1976) Image Get A Lick (7") (Warika)
- The Congos & Friends (1977) Fisherman
- The Congos (1977) Heart Of The Congos
- The Mexicano (1977) Move Up Starsky
- Musicism (1977) Swing Me Gentle
- Musicism (1977) Riding In Rhythm
- The Maytals (1977) Toots Presents The Maytals
- Toots & The Maytals (1978) Famine / Pass The Pipe (Island Records)
- Toots & The Maytals (1978) Take It From Me (7") (Island Records)
- Harold Butler (1978) Gold Connection
- Ernie Smith (1978) I'll Sing For Jesus
- Derrick Morgan (1978) Love City
- Lovindeer (1978) Sexy Reggae
- The Mexicano (1978) Goddess Of Love
- Jackie Edwards (1978) Starlight
- Dandy Livingstone (1978) The South African Experience
- Toots & The Maytals (1979) Israel Children / Turn It Up (7") (Louv)
- Multiple Artists (1979) Children Of Babylon (Original Motion Picture Soundtrack)<
- Nana McLean (1979) Dream Of Life
- Danny Adams (1979) Summer In Montego Bay
- Ojiji (1979) The Shadow
- Toots & The Maytals (1979) Pressure Drop: Best of Toots & The Maytals (Trojan)
- Toots & The Maytals (1979) Pass the Pipe, (Island)
- Toots & The Maytals (1979) Just Like That, (Island)
- Toots & The Maytals (1979) The Best Of Toots And The Maytals (Trojan Records)
- Toots & The Maytals (1980) Just Like That / Gone With The Wind (Island Records)
- Toots & The Maytals (1980) Toots & The Maytals E.P. (Island Records)
- Toots & The Maytals (1980) Chatty, Chatty (Island Records)
- Toots & The Maytals (1980) Live: Monkey Man / Hallelujah (7") (Island Records)
- Toots & The Maytals (1980) Chatty, Chatty (7", Single) (Island Records)
- Toots & The Maytals (1980) Toots "Live," (Island)
- Hearbert Lee (1980) Love Songs Vol. 1
- Bobby Stringer (1980) Reggae Love Songs
- Ossie Scott (1980) Many Moods Of Ossie Scott
- Toots & The Maytals (1981) I Can See Clearly Now (Island Records)
- Toots & The Maytals (1981) Beautiful Woman (Island Records)
- Toots & The Maytals (1981) Papa D / You Never Know (Louv)
- Toots & The Maytals (1981) Beautiful Woman / Show Me The Way (12") (Island Records)
- Toots & The Maytals (1981) Papa Dee Mama Dear / Dilly Dally (7", Single) (Island Records)
- Toots & The Maytals (1981) His Songs Live On (7") (Louv)
- Toots & the Maytals (1981) Knock Out!
- Beres Hammond (1981) Let's Make A Song
- Multiple Artists (1981) The King Kong Compilation: The Historic Reggae Recordings
- Toots & The Maytals (1982) I Know We Can Make It / Spend A Weekend (7", Single) (Island Records)
- Dennis Brown / Toots & The Maytals (1982) Sitting & Watching / Bam Bam (7", Single) (Island Records)
- Toots & The Maytals (1982) Knockout, (Island)
- Live at Reggae Sunsplash: Best of the Festival r(1982) Day One<
- Toots & the Maytals (1982) Hour Live
- Pluto Shervington (1982) I Man Born Ya
- Pioneers (1982) Reggae For Lovers
- Pluto Shervington (1982) Your Honour
- Lovindeer (1983) Man Shortage
- Ochi Brown (1983) Danger Date
- Boyo (1983) You're My World
- George Pioneer & Jackie Pioneer (1983) Reggae For Lovers Volume 2
- Toots & The Maytals (1984) Live At Reggae Sunsplash
- Toots & The Maytals (1984) Reggae Greats (Island)
- Owen Gray (1985) Watch This Sound
- Lovindeer (1987) Caribbean Christmas Cheer
- Lovindeer (1988) Octapussy
- Toots & The Maytals (1988) Toots in Memphis, (Island)
- Toots & The Maytals (1988) Do The Reggae 1966-1970 (Attack Records)
- (1990) Clancy Eccles Presents His Reggae Revue>
- Toots & The Maytals (1990) An Hour Live
- Bob Marley & The Wailers (1992) Songs Of Freedom CD-01
- Toots & The Maytals (1992) Knock Out!
- The Maytals (1993) Bla. Bla. Bla.
- Multiple Artists (1993) Kingston Town: 18 Reggae Hits
- Multiple Artists (1993) The Story of Jamaican Music: Tougher Than Tough
- Toots & The Maytals (1995) The Collection (Spectrum)
- Clancy Eccles (1996) Joshua's Rod of Correction
- King Stitt (1996) Reggae Fire Beat
- The Dynamites (1996) The Wild Reggae Bunch
- Toots & The Maytals (1996) Time Tough: The Anthology (Island)
- Toots & The Maytals (1996) Monkey Man ((Compilation) (House Of Reggae)
- Toots & The Maytals (1997) Recoup, (Alia Son)
- Multiple Artists (1997) Fire On The Mountain: Reggae Celebrates The Grateful Dead Vol. 1 & 2
- Clancy Eccles & The Dynamites (1997) Nyah Reggae Rock
- Bob Marley & The Wailers (1998) The Complete Wailers CD-03
- From Chapter To Version (1998) 20 Reggae DJ Classics
- Multiple Artists (1998) From GG's Reggae Hit Stable Volume 1 & 2
- Derrick Harriott (1998) Riding The Roots Chariot
- Toots & The Maytals (1998) Live in London, (Trojan)
- Toots & The Maytals (1998) The Very Best of Toots & The Maytals, (Music Club)
- Toots & The Maytals (1998) Ska Father, (Artists Only)
- Toots & The Maytals (1998) Jamaican Monkey Man (Recall 2 cd)
- The Maytals / Toots & the Maytals (1999) Monkey Man & From The Roots
- Toots & the Maytals (1999) That's My Number
- The Maytals (1999) The Originals (Charly)
- Morgan Heritage & Denroy Morgan / Toots & The Maytals (1999) Harvest Is Plenty / Lost Your Character (7") (HMG Records)
- Toots & The Maytals (1999) Bam Bam / 54 - 46 (7") (Marvellous Records)
- Toots & The Maytals (1999) Prayer of David (7", Single) (Treasure Chest)
- Toots & The Maytals (2000) Live At Red Rocks (PRG Records, Allah Son Records)
- Toots & The Maytals (2000) The Very Best Of Toots & The Maytals (Island Records)
- Toots & The Maytals (2000) 20 Massive Hits (Compilation) (Metro)
- The Maytals (2001) Fever
- The Maytals (2001) Dressed to Kill
- Toots & The Maytals (2001) 54-46 Was My Number - Anthology 1964 To 2000 (Trojan Records)
- Toots & The Maytals (2001) Best Of Toots & The Maytals / Broadway Jungle (Trojan Records)
- Toots & The Maytals (2001) The Best Of Toots & The Maytals (Island Records)
- Clancy Eccles (2001) Reggae Revue at the VIP Club, Vol. 3
- Clancy Eccles (2001) Reggae Revue at the Ward Theatre 1969-1970
- (2001) The Reggae Box
- Toots & The Maytals / L.M.S.* (2002) Humble / Respect All Woman (7") (71 Records)
- Toots & The Maytals (2002) Sweet And Dandy: The Best of Toots and the Maytals (Trojan Records)
- Toots & the Maytals (2003) World Is Turning
- Toots & The Maytals (2003) 54 - 46 / Pressure Drop (7") (Beverley's Records)
- Toots & The Maytals (2003) Funky Kingston / In The Dark (Compilation) (Island Records)
- Toots & The Maytals (2003) Jungle (Single) (XIII BIS Records)
- Paul Douglas (2004) Eyes Down
- Toots & the Maytals (2004) True Love
- Toots & The Maytals (2004) This Is Crucial Reggae (Compilation) (Sanctuary Records)
- Toots & The Maytals Featuring Shaggy And Rahzel (2004) Bam Bam (V2)
- Toots & The Maytals (2005) Pressure Drop: The Definitive Collection (Trojan Records)
- Toots & The Maytals (2005) Roots Reggae - The Classic Jamaican Albums (Trojan Records)
- Toots & The Maytals (2005) Rhythm Kings (Compilation) (Xtra)
- Toots & The Maytals (2005) Deep In My Soul / Daddy (Beverley's Records)
- Toots & The Maytals (2005) Border Line (Single) (XIII Bis Records)
- Toots & The Maytals (2006) The Essential Collection (Compilation) (Sanctuary Records)
- The Congos & Friends (2006) Fisherman Style
- Toots & The Maytals (2006) I've Got A Woman (A Tribute To Ray Charles) (7") (D&F Productions)
- Toots & The Maytals (2006) Acoustically Live at Music Millennium (CD, EP) (Junketboy)
- Toots & the Maytals (2007) Light Your Light
- Ben Harper & The Skatalites / Toots & The Maytals (2007) Be My Guest / I Want You To Know (Imperial)
- Toots & The Maytals (2008) Sweet And Dandy: The Best of Toots & The Maytals (Compilation) (Trojan Records)
- Glen Ricketts (2008) Rise Up
- Tommy McCook & The Supersonics (2009) Pleasure Dub
- The Dynamites / King Tubby (2009) Sound System International
- Eugene Grey (2010) Diversity
- Toots & the Maytals (2010) Flip and Twist
- Toots And The Maytals / Roland Alphonso (2010) Hold On / On The Move (7") (Pyramid)
- Toots & The Maytals (2010) Pee Pee Cluck Cluck (7") (Pyramid)
- Toots & The Maytals / Don Drummond (2010) Alidina / Dragon Weapon (7") (Pyramid)
- Toots & The Maytals (2011) Pressure Drop: The Golden Tracks (Cleopatra)
- Toots & The Maytals (2012) Pressure Drop: The Best of Toots and The Maytals (Compilation) (Universal UMC, Island Records)
- Toots & The Maytals (2012) Live! (Island Records)
- Toots & The Maytals (2012) 54 - 46 (Beverley's Records)
- Delroy Wilson / Toots & The Maytals (2012) Gave You My Love / One Eye Enos (7") (Beverley's Records)
- Toots & The Maytals (2012) Unplugged On Strawberry Hill
- Pressure Drop: The Essential Toots and the Maytals (2013)
- Reggae Got Soul (Reissue, 2015)
- "A Song Call Marley" (Single, 2018)
- Live at the 2018 New Orleans Jazz & Heritage Festival (2018)
- "Take Me Home, Country Roads" (Spotify Singles, 2019)
- Toots & The Maytals (2014) Sunny (7", Single) (Notable Records, Measurable Music)
- Toots & The Maytals (2020) Got to Be Tough (Trojan Jamaica/BMG)
- Paul Douglas (2021) Jazz Mi Reggae
- Jazz Mi Reggae Too (Paul Douglas Solo, 2022)
- "That's What We Call You" (Paul Douglas Single, 2024)
- "Ain't No Sunshine" (Paul Douglas Single, 2024)
- Priscilla Rollins (197X) I Love You
- Tito Simon (197X) The Heat Is On
- Demo Cates (197X) Precious Love
- Milton Douglas (198X) Can't Trust No One
- George Allison (198X) Exclusive
- Marie Bowie & K.C. White & Hortense Ellis (198X) More Reggae Love Songs
- Bobby Davis (198X) Satisfaction
- Toots & The Maytals - Reggae Live Sessions Volume 2 (Jahmin' Records)
- Danny Ray - All The Best
- Ossie Scott - The Great Pretender
- Toots & The Maytals - Peeping Tom (7", Single) (Beverley's Records)
- Toots & The Maytals - Sweet & Dandy (Single) (Beverley's Records)
- Toots & The Maytals - Pain In My Belly / Treating Me Bad (7") (Prince Buster)
- Toots & The Maytals / Byron Lee - She Never Let Me Down / River To The Bank (Federal)
- Toots & The Maytals / Desmond Dekker - Pressure Drop / Mother's Young Gal (7", Single) (Beverley's Records)
- Toots & The Maytals - Never Go Down (7") (Warika)
- Toots & The Maytals - Israel Children (7", Single) (Righteous)
- Toots & The Maytals / Ansel Collins - Monkey Man / High Voltage (7") (Beverley's Records)
- Tony Tribe / Eric Donaldson / The Upsetters / Toots & The Maytals - Classic Tracks (CD, EP) (Classic Tracks - CDEP4)
- Toots & The Maytals - Scare Him (7") (Gorgon Records)
- Toots & The Maytals - Careless Ethiopians (7") (Nyahman)
- Toots & The Maytals - Do Good All The Time (7") (Nyahman)
- Toots & The Maytals - Daddy (7") (Jaguar)
- Desmond Dekker And The Aces, Toots And The Maytals - You Can Get It If You Really Want / Pressure Drop (7") (Beverley's Records)
- Toots & The Maytals - Monkey Man / It Was Written (7") (D&F Records)
- Toots & The Maytals - Prayer of David (7", Single) (Charm)
- Toots & The Maytals - Happy Days (7", Single) (Righteous)
- Toots & The Maytals - Happy Christmas / If You Act This Way (7", Single) (Jaguar)
- Toots & The Maytals - One Family (7", Single) (Righteous)
- Toots & The Maytals - Pressure Drop (7") (Island Records)
- Toots & The Maytals - Have A Talk (7") (Black Noiz Music)
- Toots & The Maytals / The Dynamic Sisters - We Are No Strangers (7") (Thunder Bolt)
- Toots & The Maytals - Fool For You / Version (7", Single) (Allah Son Records)
- Toots & The Maytals - More And More / Version (7", Single) (Allah Son Records)
- Toots & The Maytals - Hard Road / Version (7", Single) (Allah Son Records)
- Bob Marley / Toots & The Maytals - Classic Tracks (CD, EP) (Classic Tracks - CDEP 3C)
- Toots & The Maytals - 54-46 Was My Number (Slow Cut) (7") (Beverley's Records)
- Desmond Dekker & The Aces / Toots & The Maytals - You Can Get It If You Really Want / Sweet & Dandy (7") (Beverley's Records)

== Instruments and sponsorships ==
- Paul Douglas is an official artist of Sabian, one of the "big four" manufacturers of cymbals.
- Favourite Sabian Cymbal: 16'' O Zone Evolution Crash, AAH 14'' Stage Hi Hats, HHX, 18'' HHX China
