= Clancy Eccles =

Jamaican ska and reggae musician (1940–2005)

- Born: 9 December 1940
- Origin: Dean Pen, St. Mary, Jamaica
- Died: 30 June 2005 (aged 64)
- Genres: Reggae; Ska
- Occupation: Record producer
- Years active: Mid-1950s–2005
- Labels: Clandisc, Newbeat
- Formerly of: The Dynamites

Clancy Eccles (9 December 1940 in Dean Pen, St. Mary, Jamaica – 30 June 2005 in Spanish Town, Jamaica) was a Jamaican ska and reggae singer, songwriter, arranger, promoter, record producer and talent scout. Known mostly for his early reggae works, he brought a political dimension to this music. His house band was known as The Dynamites.

== Biography ==
Son of a tailor and builder, Eccles spent his childhood in the countryside of the parish of Saint Mary. Eccles had an itinerant childhood due to his father's need to travel Jamaica seeking work. He used to regularly attend church, and he became influenced by spiritual singing; In his words: "One of my uncles was a spiritual revivalist, who always did this heavy type of spiritual singing, and I got to love that". Eccles's professional singing career began as a teenager, working the north-coast hotel circuit in the mid-1950s. In his late teens, he moved to Ocho Rios, where he performed at night in various shows, with artists such as The Blues Busters, Higgs & Wilson and Buster Brown. He moved to Kingston in 1959, where he started his recording career. He first recorded for Coxsone Dodd, who had organised a talent show in which Eccles took part.

Eccles had a Jamaican hit in 1961 with the early ska song "Freedom", which was recorded in 1959, and was featured on Dodd's sound system for two years before it was released. It was one of the first Jamaican songs with socially oriented lyrics. The song discussed the concept of repatriation to Africa, an idea developed by the growing Rastafari movement. The song became the first Jamaican hit to be used for political purposes; Alexander Bustamante, founder of the Jamaican Labour Party and at that time Chief Minister of Jamaica adopted it for his fight against the Federation of the West Indies in 1960. In the following years, Eccles had other successful songs, mixing boogie/rhythm and blues influences with ska rhythms, such as "River Jordan" and "Glory Hallelujah".

In 1962, he started promoting concerts and set up his Christmas Morning talent show; first with Dodd, then on his own. He organised concerts for The Clarendonians in 1963, and for The Wailers in 1964 and 1965. He launched other talent search contests, with Battle of the Stars, Clancy Eccles Revue, Independent Revue and Reggae Soul Revue, from which emerged stars such as Barrington Levy and Culture.

Starting in 1963, he recorded with producers such as Charlie Moo (Leslie Kong's business partner) and the husband of Sonia Pottinger, Lyndon. He couldn't make a living from his music, so he quit in 1965 to work as a tailor in Annotto Bay. During this period, he made stage outfits for musicians such as Kes Chin, The Mighty Vikings, Byron Lee and the Dragonaires, Carlos Malcolm and The Blues Busters.

He went back to music in 1967, producing his own recordings as well as those of other artists. He scored a hit with Eric 'Monty' Morris' reggae song "Say What You're Saying", and with his own song "Feel The Rhythm", one of several records that were instrumental in the shift from rocksteady to reggae. Eccles has also been credited with deriving the name 'reggae' from streggae', Kingston slang for a good-time girl. Eccles' first hit, "What Will Your Mama Say" which was released by the recently created United Kingdom label, Pama Records. In 1968, his song "Fattie Fattie" became a skinhead reggae classic, along with his productions of recordings by the toasting DJ King Stitt ("Fire Corner", "Van Cleef", "Herbman Shuffle"). Eccles recorded many organ-led instrumentals with his session band The Dynamites (same band has Derrick Harriott's Crystalites), featuring Jackie Jackson, Hux Brown, Paul Douglas, Winston Wright, Gladstone Anderson, Winston Grennan, Joe Isaacs, and Hugh Malcolm, with Johnny Moore and Bobby Ellis both contributing trumpet in different sessions. In 1970, Eccles helped pave the way to the dub music genre by releasing an instrumental version of "Herbman Shuffle" called "Phantom", with a mix focusing on the bass line.

Eccles launched different record labels for his works: Clansone, New Beat and Clandisc (the latter also the name of a sub-label set up by Trojan Records for Eccles' UK releases). He recorded artists such as Alton Ellis, Joe Higgs, the Trinidian Lord Creator ("Kingston Town"), Larry Marshall, Hemsley Morris, Earl Lawrence, The Beltones, Glen Ricks, Cynthia Richards, Buster Brown and Beres Hammond. Appreciated by musicians for his fairness and sense of equity, he helped Lee Perry set up his Upsetter record label in 1968 after Perry left Dodd's employment, and helped Winston 'Niney' Holmes (later known as 'The Observer') record his first hit as a producer in 1971 ("Blood & Fire").

A socialist militant, Eccles was appointed as an adviser on the music industry to Michael Manley's People's National Party (PNP) and took part in Jamaica's 1972 prime ministerial elections by organising a "Bandwagon" featuring musicians such as Bob Marley & the Wailers, Dennis Brown, Max Romeo, Delroy Wilson and Inner Circle, performing around the island in support of Manley's campaign. Throughout the 1970s, he remained close to Manley and wrote several songs in praise of the PNP program, including his hits "Power for the People", "Rod of Correction" or "Generation Belly".

Eccles' political interests meant that he spent less time on music, although in the late 1970s, Eccles had further success as a producer with recordings by Tito Simon and Exuma the Obeah Man, as well as collaborations with King Tubby. After the 1970s, new Eccles recordings were rare, and he concentrated on live concert promotion and re-issues of his back catalogue. In the 1980s, Eccles slowed down his musical activities, and he never met success again, apart from a few political songs, such as "Dem Mash Up The Country" in 1985. Eccles died on 30 June 2005, in Spanish Town Hospital from complications of a heart attack.

Eccles' son, Clancy Eccles Jr., has followed his father into the music business, initially performing as simply "Clancy".

== Discography ==
=== Singles before 1967 ===
- "River Jordan" / "I Live And I Love" – 1960 – Blue Beat produced by Coxsone Dodd
- "Freedom" / "More Proof" – 1960 – Blue Beat produced by Coxsone Dodd
- "Judgement" / "Baby Please" – 1963 – Island Records produced for Charlie Moo
- "I'm The Greatest" – 1963 – produced by Mike Shadad
- "Glory Hallelujah" – 1963 – Island Records produced by Coxsone Dodd
- "Sammy No Dead" / "Roam Jerusalem" – 1965 – Ska Beat produced by Lyndon Pottinger.
- "Miss Ida" – 1965 – Ska Beat

=== Compilations after 1967 ===
==== Clancy Eccles ====
- Clancy Eccles – Freedom – 1969 – Clandisc/Trojan
- Clancy Eccles – 1967–1983 – Joshua's Rod of Correction – Jamaican Gold (1996)
- Clancy Eccles – Top of the Ladder – 1973 – Big Shot/Trojan

==== Clancy Eccles & The Dynamites ====
- The Dynamites – Fire Corner – 1969 – Clandisc
- Clancy Eccles & The Dynamites – Herbsman Reggae – 1970 – Clandisc
- Clancy Eccles & The Dynamites – Top of the Ladder – 1973 – Big Shot/Trojan
- The Dynamites – The Wild Bunch Are The Dynamites – 1967–71 – Jamaican Gold (1996)
- Clancy Eccles & The Dynamites – Nyah Reggae Rock – 1969–70 – Jamaican Gold (1997)

==== Clancy Eccles productions ====
- King Stitt – Reggae Fire Beat – 1969–70 – Jamaican Gold (1996)
- Cynthia Richards & Friends – Foolish Fool −1970 – Clandisc
- Tito Simon – Just Tito Simon – 1973 – Horse/Trojan coproduced by Joe Sinclair
- Various – Clancy Eccles – Fatty Fatty – 1967–70 – Trojan (1998)
- Various – Clancy Eccles Presents His Reggae Revue – Rock Steady Intensified – 1967–72 – Heartbeat Records (1990)
- Various – Kingston Town: 18 Reggae Hits – Heartbeat Records (1993)
- Various – Clancy Eccles – Feel The Rhythm - 1966–68 – Jamaican Gold (2000)
- Various – Clancy Eccles' Rock Steady Reggae Revue at Sombrero Club – 1967–69 – Jamaican Gold (2001)
- Various – Clancy Eccles' Reggae Revue At The Ward Theatre – 1969–70 – Jamaican Gold (2001)
- Various – Clancy Eccles' Reggae Revue At The VIP Club – 1970–73 – Jamaican Gold (2001)
- Various – Clancy Eccles' Reggae Revue At The Carib Theatre – 1973–86 – Jamaican Gold (2001)
- Various – Clancy Eccles: Freedom – An Anthology – Trojan (October 2005)
