= Rupie Edwards =

Jamaican reggae singer and record producer (1945–2026)

- Born: Rupert Lloyd Edwards; 4 July 1945; Goshen, Saint Ann Parish, Jamaica
- Died: 27 March 2026 (aged 80) Hackney, London, England
- Genre: Reggae
- Occupations: Singer, record producer
- Instruments: Vocals, record producer
- Years active: Early 1960s–2026
- Labels: Success, Opportunity, Cactus/Trojan

Rupert Lloyd Edwards (4 July 1945 – 27 March 2026) was a Jamaican reggae singer and record producer.

== Life and career ==
Rupert Lloyd Edwards was born in Goshen, in Saint Ann Parish. The family moved to Kingston in 1958, where he sang in talent contests, including those run by Vere Johns. He was spotted by producer S.L. Smith, for whom he recorded his debut single, "Guilty Convict" b/w "Just Because", released on Smith's Hi=Lite label nd licensed to Blue Beat Records in 1962.

After recording a few further singles, he formed the Ambassadors in 1965 with Paragons singer Junior Menz and guitarist Eric Frater, becoming the Virtues with the addition of Dobby Dobson. They recorded several singles for Harry J, as well as Edwards' first self-production, "Burning Love", credited to Rupie Edwards and the Virtues.

The Virtues broke up in 1968, and Edwards started to focus mainly on his work as a producer, although he continued to release his own records in the late 1960s and early 1970s. By the beginning of the 1970s, he had recorded artists like The Heptones, The Mighty Diamonds, Carl Malcolm, Bob Andy, Johnny Clarke, Joe Higgs, Gregory Isaacs ("Lonely Man") and The Ethiopians on his own record labels 'Success' and 'Opportunity', based at his Success record shop in Orange Street, and on the Trojan Records sub-labels Big Records and Cactus. He also worked with DJs such as U-Roy, Dennis Alcapone and I-Roy, and released some instrumental versions with his studio band, The Rupie Edwards All Stars. The group included musicians such as saxophonist Tommy McCook, trombone player Vin Gordon, drummer Carlton 'Santa' Davis, guitarist Hux Brown, pianist Gladstone Anderson, bassist Clifton 'Jackie' Jackson and organist Winston Wright.

In 1974, he released an album (Yamaha Skank) containing solely of tracks based on the Uniques' "My Conversation" riddim, credited as the first single-riddim album. In 1974 and 1975, he scored hits in the UK Singles Chart with "Ire Feelings" and "Leggo Skanga". Both tracks were based on the same riddim, first used for Johnny Clarke's "Everyday Wondering", and the Ire Feelings album followed in 1975. Another one-riddim album based on these tracks, Ire Feelings - Chapter and Version, was released by Trojan in 1990.

After these successes, Edwards moved to London, and continued producing and recording, working with artists such as Jah Woosh, Gladstone Anderson, Errol Dunkley, Dobby Dobson, and Shorty the President, and releasing a series of Dub Basket albums culled from his earlier productions. He later mainly recorded gospel music.

Edwards died in Hackney, London on 27 March 2026, aged 80. He was buried on 2 April.

== Discography ==
=== Albums ===
- Yamaha Skank (1974), Success
- Ire Feelings (1975), Cactus
- Jamaica Serenade (1976), Cactus
- Conversation Stylee (1980), Tad's
- Lovers Roots (198?), Success - split with Dobby Dobson
- Pleasure and Pain (1987), Success
- Sweet Gospel Volume Four, Rupie Edwards
- Bible Music Citation (2007), Success

=== Compilations ===
- Various Artists - Rupie's Gems - 1972-1974 (1974), Cactus
- Various Artists - Yamaha Skank (1974), Success
- Rupie Edwards & Various Artists - Hit Picks (1974), Horse
- Rupie Edwards All Stars - Dub Basket (1975), Cactus - also issued as Dub Classic (1977), Success
- Rupie Edwards All Stars - Dub Basket Chapter 2 (1976), Cactus
- Various Artists - Rupie's Gems Volume 2 (1976), Cactus
- Hit Picks Volume 1 (1977), Success
- Various Artists - Ire Feelings, Chapter & Version 1973-1975 (1990), Trojan
- Rupie Edwards & Friends - Let There Be Version (1990), Trojan
- Rupie Edwards All Stars & Various Artists - Pure Gold - Success
- Various Artists - House of Lovers
- Various Artists - Rupie's Scorchers - 1969-1971 - Trybute (2002)
- Success Archives vols. 1-8 (2006-2007), Success
- Best of Sweet Gospel, Reggae And Soul - Vols. 1 - 7 (2006), Success
- Rupie Edwards Presents Success Archives - From Kingston Jamaica to London UK (2013), Rupie Edwards

== See also ==
- List of Jamaican record producers
- List of reggae musicians
