= Pressure Drop (song) =

Single by the Maytals

from the album Monkey Man and The Harder They Come
- B-side: "Smoke Screen" (by Beverley All Stars)
- Released: 1970
- Recorded: 1969
- Genre: Reggae; ska
- Label: Beverley's; Trojan
- Songwriter: Frederick "Toots" Hibbert
- Producer: Leslie Kong

The Maytals singles chronology
""Sweet & Dandy/Oh Yea""	"Pressure Drop"	""54 46 (Was My Number)/The Man""

"Pressure Drop" is a song recorded in 1969 by Jamaican musical group the Maytals for record producer Leslie Kong. The song appears on their 1970 album Monkey Man (released in Jamaica by Beverley's Records) and From the Roots (released in the UK by Trojan Records). "Pressure Drop" helped launch the band's career outside Jamaica when the song was featured on the soundtrack to the 1972 film The Harder They Come, which introduced reggae to much of the world. In 2004, Rolling Stone rated the song No. 453 in its list of the 500 Greatest Songs of All Time. This song has been covered often, most notably by Robert Palmer, the Specials, Keith Richards, Izzy Stradlin and the Ju Ju Hounds, the Oppressed and the Clash.

In an interview in 2016, songwriter Frederick "Toots" Hibbert said that "Pressure Drop" was a song about karmic justice.

It’s a song about revenge, but in the form of karma: If you do bad things to innocent people, then bad things will happen to you. The title was a phrase I used to say. If someone done me wrong, rather than fight them like a warrior, I’d say: 'The pressure’s going to drop on you.'"

— Frederick ‘Toots’ Hibbert, The Guardian

== Charts ==
Chart performance for "Pressure Drop" by Izzy Stradlin
Chart (1992)	Peak position
Australia (ARIA)	47
Sweden (Sverigetopplistan)	40
UK Singles (Official Charts)	45

== Certifications ==
Certifications for "Pressure Drop"
Region	Certification	Certified units/sales
United Kingdom (BPI)	Silver	200,000^{‡}
^{‡} Sales+streaming figures based on certification alone.
