= 54-46 That's My Number =

Single by Toots and the Maytals
- Released: January 1, 1968
- Genre: Rocksteady, reggae
- Label: Beverley's
- Songwriter: Toots Hibbert
- Producer: Leslie Kong

"54-46 (That's My Number)" is a song by Fred "Toots" Hibbert. Recorded by Toots and the Maytals, the song was originally released on the Beverley's label in Jamaica and the Pyramid label in the UK. A follow-up version released a year later, "54-46 Was My Number", was one of the first reggae songs to receive widespread popularity outside Jamaica, and is seen as being one of the defining songs of the genre. It has been anthologised repeatedly and the titles of several reggae anthologies include "54-46" in their title.

The lyrics describe Toots' time in prison after being arrested for possession of marijuana. The song features a similar riddim to "Train to Skaville" by Toots and the Maytals' contemporaries the Ethiopians.

== In popular culture ==
The song appears in the sci-fi film Repo Men and in the series Narcos: Mexico.

The song is also used as the soundtrack to the opening titles of 2006 Shane Meadows directed movie This is England.

On November 29, 2016, Major Lazer and Bad Royale released "My Number", a track that samples "54-46 That's My Number". Pitchfork describes the song as "a genre-defining classic from legendary ska/reggae group Toots and the Maytals." This release contains newly recorded vocals from frontman Toots Hibbert specifically designed for Major Lazer, changing the original lyrics to incorporate the group into the song while keeping the original melody.

== Certifications ==
Region	Certification	Certified units/sales
New Zealand (RMNZ) "54-46 (Was My Number)"	Gold	15,000^{‡}
United Kingdom (BPI) "54-46 (Was My Number)"	Gold	400,000^{‡}
^{‡} Sales+streaming figures based on certification alone.
