= Judge Not (song) =

Single by Bob Marley & Beverley's All-Stars
- B-side: "Do You Still Love Me?"
- Released: December 1962
- Studio: Federal
- Genre: Ska
- Label: Beverley's
- Songwriter(s): Bob Marley
- Producer(s): Leslie Kong

Bob Marley & Beverley's All-Stars singles chronology
"Judge Not" (1962)	"One Cup of Coffee" (1962)

"Judge Not" is Bob Marley's first recorded single, recorded at Federal Studios and released on Leslie Kong's Beverley's Records in Jamaica in 1962 and on Island Records in the UK the following year. On this shuffle, pre-ska beat, Marley has a youthful voice, as he was 16 years old at the time of recording. Headley Bennett performed saxophone on this recording. Though "Judge Not" failed to achieve much success, Marley was not discouraged and continued to record music. "Judge Not" was re-released in the Songs of Freedom album in 1992 as well as other compilations. The song was written by Helen Carter and Dolores Dinning and first recorded by American country music singer Margie Bowes (Hickory 1135, Nashville, 1960. B-side: "Are You Teasing Me"), also covered by Sublime, and can be found on the box set Everything Under the Sun.

The song is about morality, and may have been based on the Biblical quote "Judge not lest ye be judged". Some of the song lyrics are paraphrased in the background vocals of the later Marley hit "Could You Be Loved".

Recorded at the same session, Bob Marley's second release on the Beverley's label One Cup of Coffee was also a country music cover version (written by Claude Gray) arranged on the shuffle beat that was popular in Jamaica at the time (ska only appeared on record the following year).

== Covers ==
Ska band The Interrupters covered "Judge Not" on their 2014 debut album The Interrupters. The song is frequently included in their live sets.
