= The Blues Busters =

Jamaican vocal duo

- Origin: Montego Bay, Jamaica
- Genres: Ska, soul, Blue Beat, Reggae
- Years active: 1960–mid-1980s
- Labels: Blue Beat, Island, Dynamic, Sarge
- Past members: Philip James; Lloyd Campbell

The Blues Busters was a vocal duo from Jamaica formed in 1960, consisting of Philip James (31 December 1941 – 1989) and Lloyd Osbourne Campbell (9 March 1941 – 1992). The Blues Busters was the most consistently popular Jamaican male duo of the early 1960s. They were also among the Jamaican artists who performed at the 1964 New York World's Fair. They initially worked in cabaret shows to tourists in Kingston and Jamaica's north coast, but got their big break when they were asked to accompany Sam Cooke on his tour of the island in March, 1961. Taking inspiration from Cooke, on returning to the cabaret circuit they emulated the soulful harmonies of his performances and recorded a number of soul and reggae cover versions, having minor hits with "Thinking" and "Privilege". In 1976, The Blues Busters appeared on the same bill as Bob Marley & The Wailers at several concerts in the United States during the Rastaman Vibration tour. They continued until the mid-1980s, by which time they had released several albums, one of which was a tribute to Cooke.

In the late 1960s the pair moved to New York City. There James reportedly died from asthma at age 47 in 1989, and Campbell from a heart attack at age 50 in 1992. The duo are buried with one grave between them in the Pye River Cemetery in Montego Bay, Jamaica, the city of their births.

In 2015 Campbell and James were posthumously honoured with keys to the City Of Montego Bay by the St. James Parish Council.

== Discography ==
=== Albums ===
- Behold How Sweet It Is (1964), Sunshine
- The Best of the Blues Busters (1965), Sunshine
- Each One Teach One (1970/1971), Dynamic
- Philip and Lloyd (1975), Scepter
- Truth (1979), Sarge
- Tribute to Sam Cooke (1980), Sarge
- Top of the Pops (1982), Echo
- How Sweet It Is (1997), Kingston Gold

Compilations

- The Best of the Blues Busters, Dynamic
- In Memory of the Blues Busters: Their Best Ska and Soul Hits 1964-1966 (1993), Jamaican Gold
- Behold! The Anthology (2005), Trojan

=== Singles ===
- "Little Vilma" (1960), Limbo
- "I Need Some Lovin'" (1961), Limbo
- "Early One Morning" (1961), Limbo
- "Donna" (1961), Coxsone, Blue Beat
- "Lost My Baby" (1961), Island, Starlite
- "Your Love" (1961), Island, Starlite
- "There's Always Sunshine" (1962), Blue Beat, Supreme, Coxsone
- "Behold!" (1962), Island, Sunshine
- "Tell Me Why" (1962), Blue Beat, Supreme
- "How Many Times" (1963), Supreme
- "Behold!" (1964), Kentone
- "Love And Emotion" (1964), Starline
- "Don't Take Your Love Away" (1964), BMN
- "You're No Good" (1965), BMN
- "I Won't Let You Go" (1965), Kentone
- "Wings Of A Dove" (1965), Soul, Island
- "How Sweet It Is" (1965), BMN
- "My Girl" (1965), Bra, Soul
- "Happy Man" (1966), Bra
- "I've Been Trying" (1966), BMN, Dr. Bird
- "Irreplaceable You" (1967), Sunshine
- "There's Always Sunshine" (1967), Sunshine, Dr. Bird
- "Ain't That Loving You" (1967), Sunshine
- "Unless" (1967), BMN
- "I Can't Stop" (1967), BMN, Jay Boy
- "Each One Teach One" (1967), Dynamic
- "Inspired To Love You" (1968), Shout
- "Love is the Answer" (1970), Minit
- "Each One Teach One" (1971), Lion, Dynamic Sounds
- "Baby I'm Sorry" (1975), Dynamic, Scepter
- "Here I am Come And Take Me (Reggae)" (1975), Scepter
- "Sweetest Little Thing" (1976), Dynamic Sounds
- "Just Don't Want To Be Lonely" (1977), Dynamic Sounds
- "Are You Changing" (1977), Hot Stuff
- "What'd I Say" (1979), Polydor
- "You're The One" (1980), International Bestseller
- "Rough & Tough" (1981), EMI
- "I've Gotta Be There", Capitol
