= Monkey Man (Toots & the Maytals song) =

Single by The Maytals
- Released: 1969
- Recorded: Dynamic Studios, Kingston, Jamaica
- Genre: Reggae
- Length: 3:29
- Label: Beverley's in Jamaica, Trojan Records in UK
- Songwriter(s): Toots Hibbert
- Producer(s): Leslie Kong

"Monkey Man" is a 1969 song by the ska and reggae group Toots & the Maytals which reached number 47 on the UK Singles Chart. The song is about a girl choosing another man over Toots. Toots & the Maytals re-recorded the song on True Love with third wave ska band No Doubt.

== Other versions ==
The song has been frequently covered by other artists, most famously by British ska group the Specials, on their self-titled debut album, and British singer Amy Winehouse. Versions by British reggae MC General Levy and American ska punk band Reel Big Fish charted on the UK Singles Chart, in 1993 and 2003 respectively. Japanese experimental rock band Melt-Banana, South-London ska group the Dualers and Argentinian band Los Pericos also covered the song.

In 2009, Australian singer Kylie Minogue and the Wiggles recorded a version of the song to raise funds for UNICEF.

== Chart performance ==
Date	Artist	UK Singles Chart peak
25 April 1970	The Maytals	47
4 September 1993	General Levy	75
22 February 2003	Reel Big Fish	86
