= Jackie Jackson (bassist) =

Jamaican bass player (1947–2026)

- Born: Clifton Courtney Jackson; 22 March 1947; Kingston, Jamaica
- Died: 23 September 2026 (aged 79) Montego Bay, Jamaica
- Genres: Ska, rocksteady, reggae
- Occupation: Musician
- Instrument: bass
- Years active: Mid-1960s – 20??

Clifton Courtney "Jackie" Jackson (22 March 1947 – 23 September 2026) was a Jamaican bass player, who was an important and prolific session musician and bassist on ska, rocksteady, reggae, dub and discomix records throughout the 1960s and 1970s, and was later a member of Toots and the Maytals.

== Life and career ==
Jackson was born in Kingston, Jamaica, on 22 March 1947 and grew up in central Kingston. His uncle was a well-known musician, Luther Williams, whose sister Mavis gave Jackson piano lessons. He attended a music school, and started playing bass after seeing Lloyd Brevett play with the Skatalites. Jackson was also influenced by Motown records, particularly the bass playing of James Jamerson. He joined his first band, Ty and the Titans, after the existing bassist left. After two years with the band, he joined the Cavaliers, led by Lester Sterling. When the Skatalites broke up, Jackson was approached by saxophonist Tommy McCook, who was forming a new band, the Supersonics. Jackson joined McCook's band, and remained with them for five years.

At his first recording session in 1967 with producer Duke Reid, he played on "Girl I've Got A Date" by Alton Ellis, which is considered one of the foundational songs of the rocksteady genre. The bass line of "Girl I've Got a Date" was allegedly duplicated in other international hits "The Liquidator" by the Harry J Allstars, and "I'll Take You There" by the Staple Singers. In the same year, he played bass on "Queen Majesty" for Pat Kelly and The Techniques, and in 1969, he played on Harry Mudie and Dennis Walks' "Drifter." During the same period, he was a member of The Upsetters, Lee "Scratch" Perry's backing band. Their single "Return of Jango" became a European hit in 1969. In 1970, still with Duke Reid, he recorded "Mabrouk" with Tommy McCook.

The record's success meant that Jackson became in great demand for sessions at Reid's Treasure Isle recording studio, directed by McCook and often playing alongside guitarists Lynn Taitt and Hux Brown, keyboard players Gladstone Anderson and Winston Wright, and drummer Winston Grennan. Jackson was a mainstay of rocksteady music, and started working with other producers including Leslie Kong, Joe Gibbs, Lloyd Daley, and Sonia Pottinger but after a short break also continued working for Reid, where the band was known as the Supersonics. At Kong's Beverley's label, where the band became known as Beverley's All-Stars, he played on Desmond Dekker's hits, including "Israelites", as well as recordings by Nicky Thomas, Bob Marley, Ken Boothe, and Toots and the Maytals, among many others. After meeting and recording with Toots Hibbert, and playing on the hit "Pressure Drop", he played on Paul Simon's 1971 recording, "Mother and Child Reunion" and on Jimmy Cliff's The Harder They Come soundtrack. He played on Hibbert's records through to the 1980s, and has also played on records by other musicians such as Herbie Mann, Garland Jeffreys, and Lee "Scratch" Perry.

As reggae became more successful internationally, Jackson became a member of Toots Hibbert's touring band from the early 1970s onwards. They became the opening band for Linda Ronstadt and the Eagles, and from then on continued to tour. Jackson also became a key influence on later bassists, including Aston "Family Man" Barrett and Robbie Shakespeare. In 2005, he won a Grammy Award as a member of Toots and the Maytals, for Best Reggae Album.

He was married to singer Karen Smith. In 2018, he was given an award for his "exceptional contribution to the reggae industry" by the Jamaica Reggae Industry Association (JARIA).

Jackson died on 23 September 2026, at the age of 79.
