= Leslie Kong =

Jamaican reggae producer (1933–1971)

Background information
- Born: 20 December 1933; Kingston, Colony of Jamaica, British Empire
- Died: 9 August 1971 (aged 37) Kingston, Jamaica
- Genres: Ska, rocksteady, reggae
- Occupation: Record producer
- Years active: 1962–1971
- Label: Beverley's

Leslie Kong (20 December 1933 – 9 August 1971) was a Jamaican reggae producer.

== Early life ==
Kong was born into a Chinese-Jamaican family. He had a "relatively comfortable upbringing" and attended St. George's College in Kingston.

== Career ==
Leslie and his two older brothers Cecil and Lloyd ran a restaurant, ice cream parlour and record shop called Beverley's in Orange Street, Kingston. In 1961, he encountered a young Jimmy Cliff outside of his shop singing a song he had written called "Dearest Beverley", in the hopes that the mention of the establishment would convince Kong to record him. This encounter led Kong to launch his own record label, Beverley's, and to record Cliff's song, launching Cliff's career in the process.

Cliff took on an A&R role for the label, and brought Bob Marley to Kong's attention. In 1962, Kong recorded Marley's first single: "One Cup of Coffee" and "Judge Not", and Jimmy Cliff's first hit, "Miss Jamaica". Kong, known in Jamaican music circles as "the Chinaman", quickly established himself as the island's leading producer of local popular music. Throughout the 1960s Kong kept recording many leading Jamaican artists from ska to reggae through rocksteady including Joe Higgs, Desmond Dekker, Toots & the Maytals, Derrick Morgan, John Holt and Stranger Cole. A wise businessman, Kong was one of the original shareholders in Island Records along with Chris Blackwell and Australian engineer Graeme Goodall. Starting in 1963 Kong began licensing ska recordings to Blackwell for release in the UK on Island's Black Swan imprint. After Blackwell bought out Kong and Goodall's share in Island, in 1967 Kong formed a second partnership with Graeme Goodall, who created the Pyramid label in the UK for the successful release of Kong's rocksteady and early reggae productions. When Pyramid folded in 1969, the licensing successes continued with Trojan Records.

Kong is known for being the first Jamaican producer to get international hits with long-time collaborator Desmond Dekker, in 1967 with "007 (Shanty Town)" and, above all, in 1969 with "Israelites" which topped the UK Singles Chart in April 1969 and went to number nine on the US charts in June 1969, selling over two million copies. During the early reggae period, he worked with Bob Marley and the Wailers (The Best of the Wailers) and enjoyed several successful hits with the Pioneers' "Long Shot Kick The Bucket", and the Melodians' "Rivers of Babylon" and "Sweet Sensation". His works with the Maytals also led to many hits including "54-46 That's My Number" and the UK charting single "Monkey Man". Matthew Sherman explains the relationship between the Maytals and Leslie Kong as follows:

From '69 to '71, Toots (Toots Hibbert) could do no wrong recording for Leslie Kong. With the consistent nucleus of musicians, the Beverley's All-Stars (Jackie Jackson, Gladstone Anderson, Winston Wright, Hux Brown, Rad Bryan, Paul Douglas and Winston Grennan) and the Maytals’ brilliant harmonising, Toots wrote and sang his unmistakable voice about every subject imaginable.

Other vocalists who recorded for him and the Beverley's label include Ken Boothe, Bruce Ruffin, the Gaylads and Delroy Wilson. Ex-Skatalites saxophonist Roland Alphonso cut numerous instrumentals for Kong during the rocksteady period. When reggae arrived in late 1968, lead instrumental duties were handled by organists Ansell Collins and Winston Wright, a member of Tommy McCook's Supersonics.

Kong makes a cameo appearance in the 1972 Jamaican film The Harder They Come, playing a recording engineer in a scene in which Jimmy Cliff's character watches a studio recording session, by Toots and the Maytals, of the song "Sweet and Dandy" (Kong was the actual producer of that recording).

Kong's plans to release a compilation album of tracks from the singles he produced by the Wailers led to Bunny Wailer allegedly threatening Kong with a curse, telling him that if he issued the record he would die. Kong went ahead with the release in 1970, and died of a heart attack, aged 37, in August 1971.

== Discography ==
- Various Artists – Original Reggae Hot Shots – 1969 – Beverley's/Trojan (1975)
- Various Artists – King Size Reggae – 1970 – Beverley's
- Various Artists – Golden Hits by the Greats – 1970 – Beverley's
- Various Artists – Reggae Chartbusters – 1970 – Beverley's
- Various Artists – King Size Reggae – 1970 – Trojan Records
- Various Artists – Hot Shots of Reggae – 1970 – Trojan Records
- Various Artists – Best of Beverley's Records 1969–1970 – Trojan Records (1981)
- Various Artists – The Best of Beverley's Records or Masterpieces From The Works of Leslie Kong – Island Records/Trojan (1981)
- Various Artists – The King Kong Compilation – Island Records (1981)
- Various Artists – Leslie Kong's Connection Vol 01 – 1969–1971 – Jet Set Records
- Various Artists – Leslie Kong's Connection Vol 02 – 1969–1971' – Jet Set Records
