= Gladstone Anderson =

Jamaican pianist and singer

- Born: 18 June 1934; Jones Town, Kingston, Colony of Jamaica
- Died: 3 December 2015 (aged 81)
- Genres: Boogie, ska, rocksteady, reggae
- Instruments: Piano, organ, keyboard vocals
- Years active: Late 1950s–2015
- Formerly of: Lynn Taitt and the Jets, Gladdy's All Stars, Harry J All Stars, The Upsetters, Roots Radics

Gladstone Anderson (18 June 1934 – 3 December 2015), also known by his nickname "Gladdy", was a Jamaican pianist, keyboard player, and singer, who played a major part in the island's musical history, playing a key role in defining the ska sound and the rocksteady beat, and playing on hundreds of recordings as a session musician, a solo artist, and as leader of Gladdy's All Stars, featuring bassist Jackie Jackson, drummer Winston Grennan, guitarist Hux Brown, and keyboardist Winston Wright. As Harry J All Stars the band had a massive hit in Jamaica and United Kingdom with the instrumental song "The Liquidator" 1969 (and 1980). Anderson's work was consistently popular in the late 70s too, as roots reggae, dub and sound system culture increasingly prioritised more conscious and deeply spiritual concerns.

== Biography ==
Gladstone Anderson was born in 1934 in Jones Town, and was taught piano at home by his uncle, the keyboardist and bandleader Aubrey Adams. He became a prominent studio pianist in the late 1950s, when he began working for Duke Reid. He worked at Reid's Treasure Isle studio, generally replacing Jackie Mittoo when The Skatalites recorded there, also working for Clement "Coxsone" Dodd and Leslie Kong, and was a member of Lynn Taitt's group The Jets, playing on many of the key ska and rocksteady recordings, and helping to define the ska sound and the rocksteady beat. He was even credited with coming up with the name "rock steady", when he used the term to describe Hopeton Lewis's "Take it Easy", when the recording (that he had played on) was played back. He also played on key early rocksteady recordings including Roy Shirley's "Hold Them", and major hits of the genre including Alton Ellis's "Girl I've Got a Date". He went on to work with producer Harry Mudie, leading Gladdy's All Stars, who were also known by different names when working with other producers, including The Aggrovators (Bunny Lee), Beverley's All Stars (Beverley's/Leslie Kong), Rupie's All Stars (Rupie Edwards), The Crystallites (Derrick Harriott), and The Dynamites (Clancy Eccles), and would later become the Upsetters when they worked with Lee "Scratch" Perry. He had success as a singer in the late 1960s working with Stranger Cole as Stranger and Gladdy, including the singles "Just Like a River" and "Seeing is Knowing". His debut album, It May Sound Silly, was released in 1972, and became a best-seller in Jamaica. Anderson continued to work with Mudie, working on the late 1970s dub album series Harry Mudie Meet King Tubby's in Dub Conference. A second solo album was released in 1977, Glady Unlimited, again produced by Mudie. Anderson released a vocal album in 1982, Sings Songs For Today and Tomorrow. Anderson was also one of several keyboard players to play in the Roots Radics.

Anderson also worked as a producer, his roots reggae recordings appearing on the Rite Sound label.

Anderson's song "Mad Mad Ivy" was sampled for Jay-Z's song "Already Home" for The Blueprint 3.

Gladstone Anderson died on 3 December 2015, aged 81.

== Discography ==
- Glad Sounds (1968), Bigshot (Gladdy with Lynn Taitt & the Jets)
- It May Sound Silly (1972), Moodisc/Ashanti
- Glady Unlimited (1977), Moodisc
- Sings Songs For Today and Tomorrow (1982), Jahmani
- Radical Dub Session (1982), Solid Groove – credited to The Roots Radics Featuring Gladstone Anderson
- Don't Look Back (1985) Overheat
- Caribbean Breeze (1989) Overheat
- Get Closer (1989) NEC Avenue
- Peace Pipe Dub (1993) Seven Leaves
- Piano in Harmony (1994) Overheat
- Gladdy's Double Score(2010) Overheat

Compilations

- Forever Dub vol 1 (1994) Roots

With Herbie Mann

- Reggae (Atlantic, 1973)
- Surprises (Atlantic, 1973 [1976])
- Reggae II (Atlantic, 1973 [1976])
