= Beverley's =

Jamaican record label

Beverley's was a Jamaican record label active between 1961 and 1971, owned by the record producer Leslie Kong. Beverley's was essential to the development of ska and rocksteady into reggae. The label launched the careers of Jimmy Cliff and Bob Marley, having released Cliff's first recording "Dearest Beverley" in 1961 and Marley's early singles "Judge Not" and "One Cup of Coffee" in 1962.

== History ==
The Beverley's ice-cream parlour/record shop at 135 Orange Street in Kingston, Jamaica, was run by the Chinese Jamaican Kong family, one of whom, Leslie Kong, started the Beverley's record label. Kong launched the label in 1961 after Jimmy Cliff auditioned the song "Dearest Beverley" at the shop, the first release on the label being Cliff's "Hurricane Hattie", with "Dearest Beverley" on the b-side. Prior to this, Beverley's was a restaurant and records shop owned by Leslie Kong and his brothers, Fats and Cecil and never had produced records. Kong had no experience of record production but had the finances to employ the cream of Jamaica's musical talent. The association with Cliff continued, including the "Miss Jamaica" single, and Cliff's debut self-titled album.

Throughout the 1960s, Beverley's recorded many Jamaican artists including Desmond Dekker (including many of his biggest hits such as "Israelites" and "007"), the Maytals ("Monkey Man"), Derrick Morgan ("Forward March"), and the Pioneers ("Long Shot Kick De Bucket"), and launched the career of Bob Marley with his first two singles. Marley returned to Beverley's with the Wailers for several more singles including "Soul Shakedown Party". Fellow Wailer Peter Tosh also recorded solo material for the label. Matthew Sherman explains the relationship between the Maytals and Leslie Kong as,

From '69 to '71, Toots (Toots Hibbert) could do no wrong recording for Leslie Kong. With the consistent nucleus of musicians, the Beverley's All-Stars (Jackie Jackson, Winston Wright, Gladstone Anderson, Hux Brown, Rad Bryan, Paul Douglas and Winston Grennan) and the Maytals' brilliant harmonizing, Toots wrote and sang his unmistakable voice about every subject imaginable.

In 1963, Kong began licensing recordings to Black Swan, a subdivision of friend Chris Blackwell's Island Records. Later he licensed recordings to Graeme Goodall's Pyramid and to Trojan Records by the end of the 60s.

The Beverley's label folded with the death of Leslie Kong in 1971.

== See also ==
- List of record labels
