= Winston Wright =

Jamaican keyboardist (1943–1993)

- Born: Winston Wright; 5 September 1943; May Pen, Jamaica
- Died: 18 March 1993 (aged 49) Kingston, Jamaica
- Occupation: Musician
- Instruments: Keyboards, vocals

Winston Wright (5 September 1943 – 18 March 1993) was a Jamaican keyboardist. He was a member of Tommy McCook's Supersonics, and acknowledged as Jamaica's master of the Hammond organ.

== Life and career ==
He was born in May Pen, Jamaica on 5 September 1943, and died in Kingston, Jamaica on 18 March 1993. He attended Glenmuir High School where he learned to play on an old Clavonette Organ. While he was in school, he played with a local group called the Mercury Band based at the Capri Theatre in May Pen, much to his father's ire. Tommy McCook saw Wright play at this time and he was invited to join the Supersonics, the Treasure Isle house band.

Perhaps Wright's best known work is as the uncredited lead organist on Harry J Allstars' 1969 instrumental hit "The Liquidator". Along with Jackie Jackson, Hux Brown, Gladstone "Gladdy" Anderson, Dougie Bryan, Winston Grennan and Paul Douglas, Wright was a member of a group of top session musicians known as the Dynamites, the Crystalites, the Beverley's All-Stars (or other All-Stars depending, on the producer) that played on countless recording sessions from the late 1960s and early 1970s.

Wright produced a solo single: "Top Secret", with the B-side "Crazy Rhythm" in 1970.

Having played for Toots and the Maytals from 1968 along with the Dynamites, Wright accompanied Toots with the Dynamites on their numerous tours throughout the 1970s and 1980s.

He died of a heart attack on 18 March 1993.

== Discography ==
=== Singles ===
- "Funny Girl"
- "Young Folks"
- "Flight 404"
- "Double Up"
- "Five Miles High"
- "Moon Invader"
- "Power Pack"
- "Moonlight Groover"
- "Mash It Up"
- "Night Owl"
- "Killowatt"
- "Common People Reggae"
- "Musical Shot"
- "Mesh Wire"
- "Groove Me V.2"
- "Version Flight (Champion)"
- "The Sleeper"
- "It's Been A Long Time (Feel It Version)"
- "Hold On Tight Version 2"
- "Proud Feeling"
- "Necktie"
- "Earthquake"
- "Ishan Version"
- "In The Mood"
- "Redemption Ground"
- "Soul Pressure"
- "Crazy Rhythm"
- "Top Secret"
- "Stealing Stealing V.2"
- "Hide & Seek"
- "Strolling Thru (Strolling In Hyde Park)"
- "For Our Desire V.2 (Soul Movement)"
- "That Did It"
- "Silhouette"
- "Doctor Upsetter"
- "Champagne & Wine"
- "Roll On Version 2"
- "Revenge (Version 2)"
- "My Love & I (Version 3)"
- "Strange Affair"
- "Want Money"
- "Example 71"
- "What Do You So" (inst)
- "Example"
- "Heads Or Tails"
- "Cotton Comes To Harlem"
- "Sinful Night"
- "Reuben"
- "Love Is The Thing"
- "Love Of The Common People"
- "You're All I Need"
- "Sporty"
- "Peace & Love"
- "Rebeloution"
- "Woman Don't You Go Astray"
- "Larry's Mood"
- "Salt & Pepper"
- "Melancholy Rock (Lucifer)"
- "Besekik Up (Feel Good)"
- "Skanking Nanny"
- "Soulful Disco"
- "Sweet Mouth"

=== With Herbie Mann ===
- Reggae (Atlantic, 1973)
- Surprises (Atlantic, 1973 [1976])
- Reggae II (Atlantic, 1973 [1976])
