= Winston Grennan =

Jamaican drummer

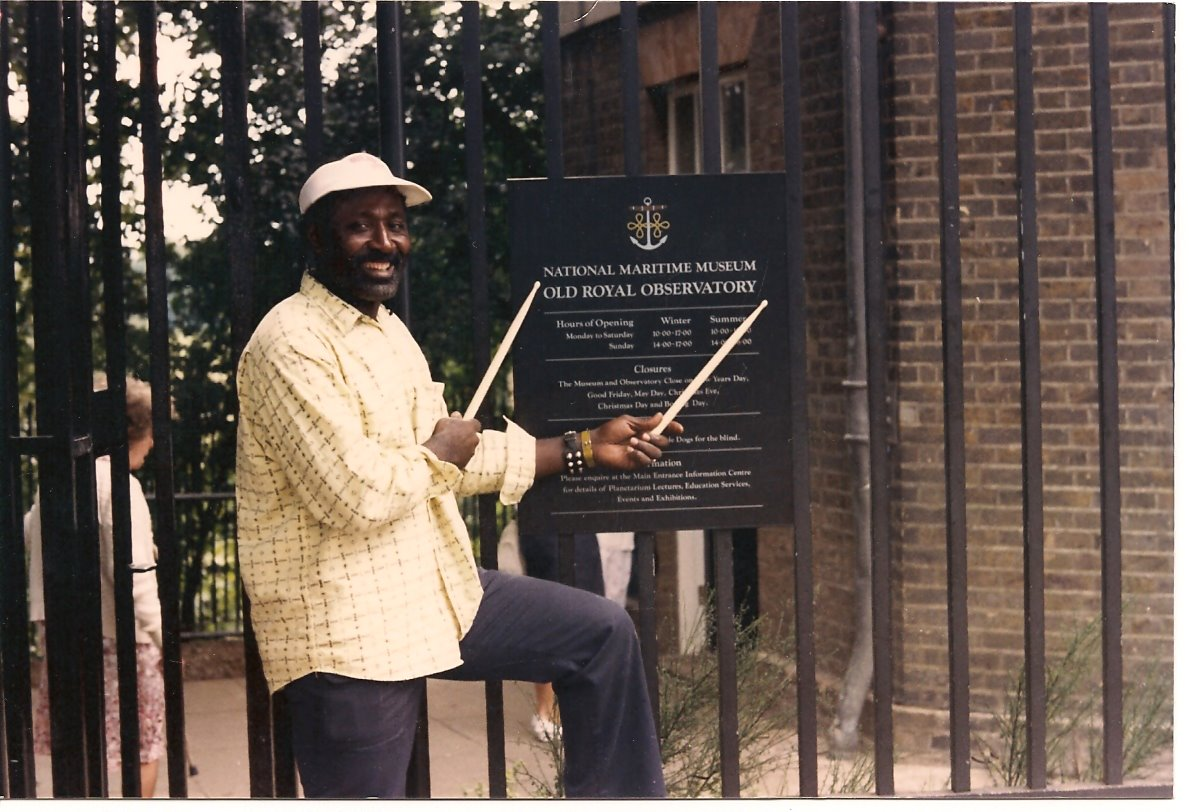
- Outside The Royal Observatory, Greenwich, London

Background information
- Born: Winston Richards; 16 September 1944
- Origin: Duckenfield, Jamaica
- Died: 27 October 2000 (aged 56)
- Genres: Reggae, ska, rock
- Occupations: Drummer singer songwriter Pianist
- Instruments: Drums vocals Piano trombone
- Years active: 1962–2000
- Labels: Island Records; Trojan Records; Decca Records; Swegway Records
- Formerly of: Bob Marley and the Wailers; Jimmy Cliff; Kid Creole and the Coconuts; Lee Perry; Paul Simon; The Rolling Stones; The Skatalites; Ska Rocks Band; Toots & the Maytals; Eric Gale; Garland Jeffreys
- Website: winstongrennan.co

Winston Grennan (16 September 1944 – 27 October 2000) was a Jamaican drummer, famous for session work from 1962 to 1973 in Jamaica as well as later in New York City through the 1970s and 1980s.

== Biography ==
=== Career ===
Grennan's career spanned several of the richest and most diverse decades in popular music, and he worked with a large number of the most famous artists of his time, both in Jamaica and in the United States.

=== Jamaica ===
Grennan is most famous for creating the one drop rhythm in the late 1960s; this beat places kick/snare emphasis on the third beat within a highly syncopated 4/4 bar. One Drop, an outgrowth of the ska and rocksteady, became the foundation for reggae music, combined with traditional Jamaican forms such as mento, burro and kumina. Grennan was also responsible for importing the "Flyers" beat to the United States – a beat which he had developed and recorded in the 60s in Jamaica. While living New York, Grennan performed at the uptown nightclub Mikell's, where local musicians scored and adapted the beat for their own use. A reconstituted Flyers later emerged in New York as the rhythm that became known as disco.

Grennan is also remembered for his work at Studio One (Coxsone Dodd), Treasure Isle (Duke Reid), Federal, and Beverly's (Leslie Kong) although he also recorded with Sonia Pottinger, Clive Chin, Byron Lee and Winston Riley, and nearly every other record producer of the era. Early album releases rarely attributed the players of instruments and the majority of Grennan's early work was uncredited.

Grennan performed on thousands of tracks over the years. He played on sessions for multiple Jamaican acts notably Toots and The Maytals, Bob Marley, the Wailers, Jimmy Cliff and Desmond Dekker. Grennan's drumming style was extremely innovative and constantly evolving. Even his drum set-up was also highly idiosyncratic: he placed his cymbals behind him. He mentored a number of Jamaican musicians including notable drummers, Carlton Barrett, Sly Dunbar, Tin Leg, and Willie Williams. Prior to leaving Jamaica he worked on recordings by various foreign acts who gravitated to Jamaica's studios, including Paul Simon, Eddie Kendricks, Peter Paul & Mary, and Booker T. and the MGs. Just before leaving Jamaica he also appeared in the classic film The Harder They Come, as well as playing on most of the soundtrack cuts.

=== New York ===
In 1973 Grennan relocated to America "to study jazz" where he embarked on sessions with saxophonist Robin Kenyatta. His work with Kenyatta (including the acclaimed "Stompin at the Savoy" album, and several others) combined with his unique, innovative style, provoked interest from diverse musicians. He was hired to record and tour with jazz and R&B performers including Marvin Gaye, Aretha Franklin, Garland Jeffreys, Dizzy Gillespie, Herbie Hancock, The OJays, Minnie Ripperton and Herbie Mann, among others (see list below). By 1980 he was tapped by August Darnell as a founding member of Kid Creole and the Coconuts, who recorded a series of hits in the 80s. Grennan can be seen performing on the 1982 release Live in Concert at The Ritz New York.

Later, Grennan appeared in the film 9½ Weeks (1985), with his Ska Rocks band, which he assembled in the 1980s and which stayed active in various incarnations until his death. Grennan formed the Swegway record label on which his band's albums were released. Notably, Lynn Taitt, the Trinidadian-born guitarist credited with creating the rock steady beat while living and working in Jamaica, and long time colleague of Grennan's, appeared on several Ska Rocks recordings. Grennan also worked on music for, or appeared in, other films including Harold and Maude, Fresh Fruit in Foreign Places, and later Sleepyheads, and Soho. He was involved in the original musical efforts for the unrealised production Reggae on Broadway.

Over the years, Grennan continued to back Toots & the Maytals, and a few other touring Jamaican acts including Pat Kelly, the Clarendonians, Yellowman and the Skatalites. In 1997, he released a fourth effort Wash Over Gold. The album demonstrated the artist's vocal and trombone talents with guest musicians including Lynn Taitt, Andy Bassford and Tony Culture. Notable tracks include a ska tribute to Don Drummond, the haunting "Colourful Faces" and the admonitory "Domestic Violence".

=== Last years ===
In the last year of his life Grennan released his final record, Clean Slate, as well as performing on and sharing arrangement duties with dub-poet Anthony Pierre on his debut, Obeah Accompong. In early 2000, Grennan appeared on Back to the Island, a reggae compilation album of local tracks produced by Peter Simon, of Martha's Vineyard. He continued to tour until he was diagnosed with cancer in May 2000. Grennan continued to record with long-time cohorts and Ska Rocks members David Oliver and Andy Bassford, almost up to his death. Throughout his life he mentored his sons on drums and other instruments, and also gave private lessons to a number of promising young drummers. His son, "Sunray" appears on several Ska Rocks recordings.

== Discography ==
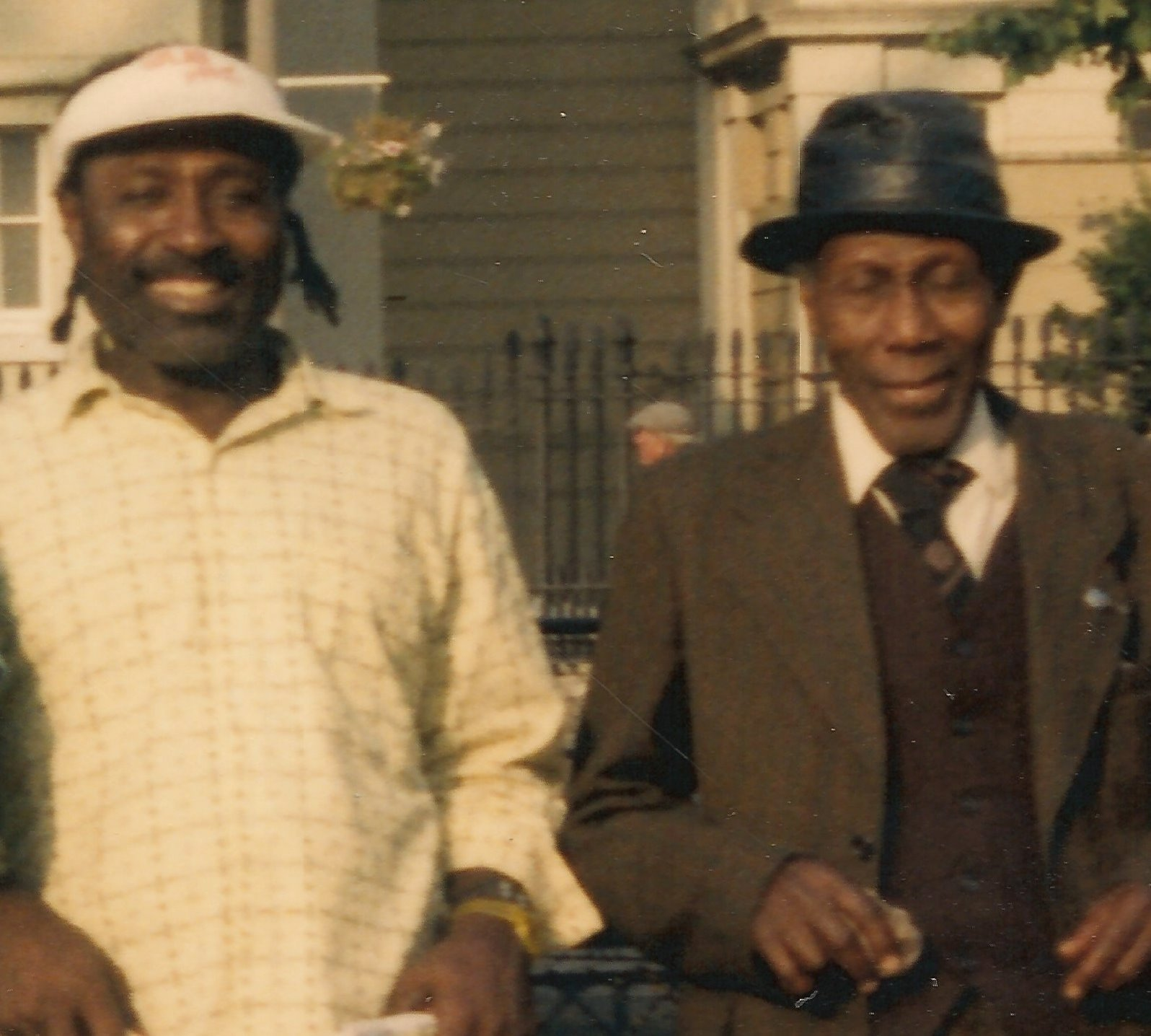
Pictured with his uncle – Musician Christopher L. Scott, Cutty Sark, London

=== Solo albums ===
- Big Apple Reggae (1982)
- Combine Nations (1989)
- Across the Border (1990)
- Wash Over Gold (1997)
- Clean Slate (2000)

=== Notable songs ===
- "Mother and Child Reunion"
- "Israelites"
- "Rivers of Babylon"
- "The Harder They Come"
- "You Can Get It If You Really Want"
- "Many Rivers to Cross"
- "No Woman No Cry"
- "Small Axe"
- "54-46 That's My Number"
- "Pressure Drop"
- "My Conversation"
- "Cherry Oh Baby"

=== Record labels ===
- Atlantic Records
- CBS Records
- Decca Records
- Discovery Records
- Elektra Records
- Island Records
- MGM Records
- Motown
- RCA Records
- Swegway Records
- Trojan Records
- Warner Bros. Records
