= Hux Brown =

Jamaican guitarist (1944–2020)

- Birth name: Lynford Brown
- Born: 4 December 1944; Port Antonio, Jamaica
- Died: 18 June 2020 (aged 75); Oakland, California, US
- Genres: Rocksteady, reggae
- Occupation: Musician
- Instrument: Guitar
- Years active: Mid-1960s–2020

Lynford "Hux" Brown (4 December 1944 – 18 June 2020) was a Jamaican guitarist who featured on many successful rocksteady and reggae records in the 1960s and 1970s, and was later a member of Toots and the Maytals.

== Biography ==
Brown was born in Port Antonio. When at school he was nicknamed "Fordie", then "Fordux", which became "Hux". He formed a band, the Vikings, before moving to Kingston where he joined the Soul Brothers at Clement Dodd's Studio One label. In 1967, he moved to the rival Treasure Isle studio for producer Duke Reid, and the following year, Brown joined the All Stars, another studio band organised by Gladdy Anderson. He also recorded extensively with Lee "Scratch" Perry.

He played rhythm guitar on many hit rocksteady and reggae records including the influential "Girl I’ve Got A Date" by Alton Ellis, "Ba Ba Boom" by the Jamaicans, and "Bangarang" by Lester Sterling, which some regard as the first reggae record. He also played on "Rivers of Babylon" by the Melodians and "The Harder They Come" by Jimmy Cliff; and in 1971 was recruited by Paul Simon to play lead guitar on "Mother and Child Reunion".

Brown later joined the touring version of Toots and the Maytals, where he remained for some 35 years.

He died in Oakland, California, aged 75.
