= The Ethiopians =

Jamaican music group

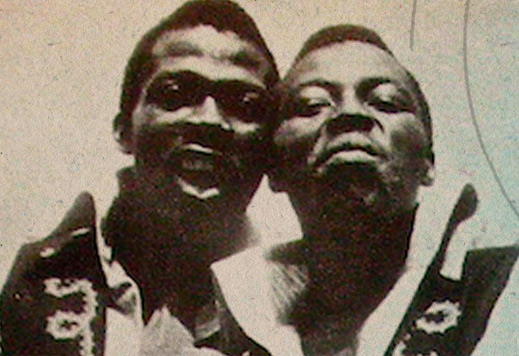

Background information
- Origin: Jamaica
- Genres: Reggae, rocksteady, ska, roots reggae
- Years active: Mid-1960s–2011
- Labels: Sir JJ, Trojan Records, Heartbeat Records
- Past members: Leonard Dillon; Steven Taylor; Aston Morris; Melvin Reid

The Ethiopians were one of Jamaica's best-loved harmony groups during the late ska, rocksteady and early reggae periods. Responsible for a significant number of hits between the mid-1960s and early 1970s, the group was also one of the first Jamaican acts to perform widely in Britain.

== Origins ==
The Ethiopians was founded by Leonard Dillon (9 December 1942 – 28 September 2011) with Stephen "Tough Cock" Taylor and Aston "Charlie" Morrison at the tail end of the ska period. Dillon was a stonemason from the small community of Boundbrook, located on the outskirts of the northeast coastal town of Port Antonio, where he was raised by his grandparents in a strict Seventh Day Adventist household. With his grandfather the choirmaster in the local church, Dillon had good grounding in music from an early age. While still attending high school, he performed with a local act known as the Playboys (later re-named Ray and the Gladiators), the mellifluousness of his voice bringing the nickname "Sparrow".

Like many of his peers, Dillon moved to Kingston towards the end of his teen years in search of work, staying first in a tiny shack in the west Kingston slum of Back-O-Wall. He travelled to Fellsmere, Florida in 1963 on a seasonal farm work contract, and after returning to Kingston in 1964, he settled in Trench Town, lodging at the home of the aunt of popular sound system deejay King Sporty, who he knew from his days in Port Antonio. In Trench Town, Dillon met Peter Tosh, who introduced him to Bob Marley and Bunny Livingston, his fellow vocalists in the Wailers. An audition was swiftly arranged at Studio One, where the Wailers were recording some of the biggest hits of the day, which led to Dillon voicing his first material. Three songs were backed by the Wailers, including a sound system favourite called "Ice Water", based on lyrics of double entendre, while "Suffering On The Land" and "Beggars Have No Choice" were more concerned with the harshness of life in the ghetto; a fourth song, "Woman, Wine And Money", featured Delroy Wilson on harmony. All of the songs were issued on 7 in (180 mm) 45 rpm singles, credited to Jack Sparrow. Shortly after the release of these singles, through the efforts of the Ethiopian Reorganization Centre in Waterhouse (established by elders Nasser King and Daddy King), Dillon entered the Rastafari faith, which he remained committed to thereafter.

== Founding ==
Sales of the Jack Sparrow material were not particularly high, and the Wailers were focussing on their own careers. Noting that harmony groups were all the rage in Jamaica, Dillon subsequently made an exit from the Studio One stable to form a harmony group of his own with Taylor, Morrison, and a youth known as Foresight, who he encountered on the street in Waterhouse; the Ethiopian Reorganization Centre became their main rehearsal space. Foresight dropped out early, so by the time Dillon brought the group back to Studio One, they were a trio, debating whether to call themselves the Heartaches or the Ethiopians, until Studio One founder Clement "Sir Coxsone" Dodd decisively stated that the latter was more distinctive, and more fitting for a group that was spiritually minded. The first songs the group recorded at Studio One included "Live Good", "Why You Gonna Leave Me Now" and the rocksteady classic "Owe Me No Pay Me",, aimed at a man known as Stampede that owed Dillon money. The uncertain nature of the music business caused Morrison to then quit the group, since he had a young family to support. Undaunted by his departure, Dillon and Taylor went back to Studio One to record another half-dozen tracks, including the boastful "I'm Gonna Take Over Now", and a late-ska number called "I Am Free," which castigated an unfaithful lover.

== Success ==
Despite the popularity of the material, their earnings were still not sufficient for the group to concentrate on music full-time. Continuing with the masonry led Dillon to the Ethiopians' next phase, once he found a financial backer for the group in the form of real estate speculator, Leebert Robinson, who financed the self-produced single "Train to Skaville", issued in Jamaica on WIRL (West Indies Records Limited). Subsequent singles, "The Whip" and "Cool It Amigo", were recorded at WIRL studio with top rocksteady band, Lynn Taitt and the Jets, (and engineer Lynford Anderson), and licensed to Sonia Pottinger for release in Jamaica, as well as Graeme Goodall's Doctor Bird label in Britain; the three songs were all significant hits in 1967. "Train to Skaville" made an impact overseas and brought the Ethiopians to the UK for their first tour in 1968, since the song had briefly appeared in the UK Singles Chart. The tour lasted three months in 1968, and another two months in 1969, and was arranged by Commercial Entertainment.

Back in Jamaica, Melvin Reid became a temporary member of the group for some recordings made at Federal recording studio, but the group soon reverted to a duo again. "Cut Down (On Your Speed)" was recorded for Lee "Scratch" Perry, but far more successful work was issued by H. Robinson's Carib Disco company, including "Reggae Hit The Town", celebrating the new beat, and the successful "Engine 54" (recorded at a time when Trinidadian immigrant Garnet Hargreaves was acting as manager of the group), which celebrated a defunct railway engine that used to transport city folk on countryside excursions in Jamaica. The popularity of this track and earlier hit singles led to a debut album, Engine 54, issued by Doctor Bird in the UK.

Dillon began a long-running collaboration with producer Carl "Sir JJ" Johnson, yielding a series of hits in the late 1960s and early 1970s. Their first major success was "Everything Crash", which commented on the widespread strikes that gripped Jamaica in 1968 and became the third best-selling record in Jamaica that year. The song was recorded with the backing band the Caribbeats after Johnson suggested the title to Dillon during a meeting at his Orange Street shop. Other hits followed, including "Feel the Spirit", "Hong Kong Flu", and "Woman Capture Man". The Sir JJ phase yielded the popular albums Reggae Power and Woman Capture Man, both issued by Trojan Records in Britain.

During the early 1970s, the Ethiopians recorded widely for various producers, including Lloyd "The Matador" Daley ("Satan Gal"), Duke Reid ("Pirate"), Derrick Harriott ("Good Ambition"), Rupie Edwards ("Hail Rasta Man"), Alvin Ranglin ("Love Bug"), Prince Buster ("You Are For Me"), Joe Gibbs ("Ring A Burn Finger"), Bob Andy ("The Word Is Love"), and Lee Perry ("Life Is A Funny Thing"), among others. Dillon also helped build Perry's Black Ark Studios in 1973-4. In 1975, Stephen Taylor was killed in a traffic accident, leading to a period of inactivity as Dillon struggled to adapt to life without his singing partner.

== New version and solo work ==
Dillon subsequently formed a new version of the Ethiopians with other members of the Rastafari faith, including Melvin Reid, to record the album Slave Call with Niney the Observer in 1977. There were also a handful of singles cut for Alvin Ranglin, Winston Riley, Joe Gibbs and Rupie Edwards, circa 1976-78.

Leonard Dillon then largely became a solo artist. Under the name The Ethiopian, Dillon cut Open The Gate Of Zion for Ranglin in 1978, and Everything Crash for Studio One in 1980, the latter featuring "Locust" voiced on an adaptation of the "Train to Skaville" rhythm. The Dread Prophecy album, shared with The Gladiators, was issued by the American label Nighthawk in 1986, One Step Forward surfaced in France on Blue Moon in 1992, Owner Fe De Yard was a Studio One set issued by Heartbeat in 1994, Tuffer Than Stone was recorded with Jahco Thelwell in 1999 and issued on the Melodie label in France, while Mystic Man was issued by Studio One in 2002; a second set for Nighthawk remains unreleased.

The Ethiopians reached the end when Dillon died on 28 September 2011.

== Discography ==
Releases by The Ethiopians include:

- Engine '54: Let's Ska and Rock Steady - (1968) - Jamaican Gold
- Reggae Power - (1969)
- Woman a Capture Man - (1970) - Trojan
- Slave Call - (1977) - Heartbeat
- Open The Gate Of Zion - (1978) - Channel One
- The Original Reggae Hitsound of The Ethiopians - (1986) - Trojan
- Dread Prophecy - (1989) - Nighthawk
- Let's Ska and Rock Steady - (1990) - VP Records
- The World Goes Ska - (1992) - Trojan
- Clap Your Hands - (1993) - Lagoon
- Sir J.J. & Friends - (1993) - Lagoon
- Owner Fer De Yard - (1994) - Heartbeat
- Train to Skaville - (1999) - Charly
- Tuffer Than Stone - (1999) - Warriors
- Skaville Princess - (2000) - Dressed to Kill
- Train to Skaville: Anthology 1966-1975 - (2002) - Trojan - compilation
- Open The Gate Of Zion - (2020) - Jamaican Art Records (de-luxe re-release)

=== Charted singles ===
List of charted singles, showing year released, chart positions and album name
Title	Year	Peak chart position	Album
Title	Year	JAM Air.	Album
"Train to Skaville"	1967	6	Engine '54: Let's Ska and Rock Steady
