= Man from Wareika =

Studio album by Rico Rodriguez
- Released: 1977 (UK, Int.)
- Recorded: May – September 1976; Joe Gibbs and Randy's Studios, Kingston, Jamaica, September 1976; "Africa" Island Hammersmith Studios, May 1976
- Genre: Reggae
- Label: Island, Blue Note, Top Ranking
- Producer: Karl Pitterson

Rico Rodriguez chronology
| Blow Your Horn (1969) | Man from Wareika (1977) | That Man Is Forward (1981) |

Professional ratings
Review scores
| Source | Rating |
|---|---|
| Imruh Caesar, 1977 | (not rated) |

Man from Wareika was the first album recording for Rico Rodriguez led by his own artistic imagination, and his first recording created for album release. It is notable for being the only roots reggae album to be released on Blue Note Records.

After recording one track ("Africa") in London with engineer Dick Cuthell as a kind of demo for label owner Chris Blackwell - its arrangement is completely different in comparison to the rest of the album and contains flute and chorus - Rodriguez was offered a contract to record this album; and he could arrange to record in Jamaica.

After 15 years Rodriguez returned for the first time to Jamaica. He had left the country in 1961 when he was already heavily involved in creating the then new ska sound. In 1976 he added something new to reggae music. A critic wrote in 1977 that the album "does not just reflect the current popular trends, but ... expresses in a definitive way the Jamaican music tradition."

The nine self-composed tracks on the album offer Jamaican rhythms with horn lines between a melodic use (e.g. on "This Day" and "Lumumba") and jazz; the latter helped to define something like a new genre, Jamaican jazz, transforming the experience from early ska days into 1970s roots reggae. Most of the songs remain in Rodriguez's live repertoire until today. Some have been re-recorded by other artists as well as by himself.

== Track listing ==
All compositions and arrangements by Rico Rodriguez

1. "This Day" – 4:14
2. "Ramble" – 4:11
3. "Lumumba" – 4:01
4. "Africa" – 4:36
5. "Man from Wareika" – 3:16
6. "Rasta" – 3:38
7. "Over the Mountain" – 3:14
8. "Gunga Din" – 3:53
9. "Dial Africa" – 3:22

== Personnel ==
- Rico Rodriguez - trombone
- Viv "Talent" Hall - trumpet
- Bobby Ellis - trumpet
- Richard "Dirty Harry" Hall - tenor saxophone
- George Lee - tenor saxophone
- Herman Marquis - alto saxophone
- Ray Allen - alto saxophone
- Bernard "Touter" Harvey - keyboards
- Ansell Collins - keyboards
- Errol "Tarzan" Nelson - keyboards
- Karl Pitterson - lead guitar, keyboards, percussion
- Radcliffe "Duggie" Bryan - lead guitar
- Junior Hanson Marvin - lead guitar
- Lloyd Parks - rhythm guitar
- Ras Robbie Shakespeare - bass
- Sly Dunbar - drums
- Skully - wood drums
- Flick - fussy tambourine

Personnel on "Africa"

- Rico Rodriguez - trombone
- Eddie "Tan Tan" Thornton - trumpet
- Keith Gemmell - tenor saxophone
- Tony Washington - keyboards
- Phillip Chen - rhythm guitar
- Bunny McKenzie - bass
- Jacko (Although it is very likely to be Carlton 'Carly' Barrett.) - drums
- Tony Utah - percussion
- Satch Dixon - percussion
- Ijahman - backing vocals
- Candy McKenzie - backing vocals

Recorded at Joe Gibbs Studios and Randy's Recording Studio, Kingston, Jamaica, September 1976.
Engineers: Karl Pitterson, Errol Thompson, Dick Cuthell, assisted by Flick.
"Africa" was recorded at Island Hammersmith Studios, May 1976 by Dick Cuthell.
All tracks mixed at Island Basing Street Studios by Karl Pitterson and Dick Cuthell, assisted by Kevin Dallimore.
Executive producer: Chris Blackwell

Cover illustration by Tony Wright. Design by Eckford/Stimpson.

== Releases ==
1977:

- LP: Island ILPS 9485 /UK
- LP: Blue Note BN LA819 H /US
- LP: Top Ranking no # /Jamaica

ca. late 1980s:

- CD: Mango /Island CID 9485 /UK

1999/2000:

- Vinyl Only /Island

2004:

- CD: Island Japan

2016:

- CD: Caroline International CAROLR049CD (Double CD featuring 'Man From Wareika' and 'Wareika Dub' with extra tracks.)

Man From Wareika was also remixed into a dub version, released as Warrika Dub (LP: Ghetto Rockers PRE 1), re-released 2004 in Japan on Island CD.
