= Proverbial Reggae =

Studio album by The Gladiators
- Released: 1978 (CD Reissue: 2002)
- Recorded: 1978, Harry J & Joe Gibbs Studios
- Genre: Roots Reggae
- Length: 33:25
- Label: Front Line, FL 1002 / CDFL 31
- Producer: "Prince" Tony Robinson

The Gladiators chronology
Trenchtown Mix Up (1976)	Proverbial Reggae (1978)	Naturality (1979)

Professional ratings
Review scores
Source	Rating
Allmusic	4/5 stars

Proverbial Reggae is the second album by Jamaican Roots Reggae band The Gladiators, recorded and released in 1978 on Virgin Records' Front Line imprint.

British dub poet Linton Kwesi Johnson has said the songs on Proverbial Reggae "combine intelligent, poetic lyrics with majestic melodies, enchanting harmonies, producing inspired, entertaining meaningful music."

== Track listing ==
_{All songs by Albert Griffiths unless noted.}

Side One

1. "Jah Works" - 3.30
2. "The Best Things in Life" - 4.02
3. "Dreadlocks the Time is Now" - 3.03
4. "Fly Away" - 3.45
5. "Marvel Not" - 3.54 (Clinton Fearon)

Side Two

1. "Stick a Bush" - 2.27
2. "Stop Before You Go" - 3.00
3. "Can You Imagine How I Feel" - 4.10 (Clinton Fearon)
4. "We'll Find the Blessing" - 3.02
5. "Music Makers from Jamaica" - 3.40

== Personnel ==
- "Prince" Tony Robinson - Producer
- Albert Griffiths - Lead Guitar, Vocals
- Clinton Fearon - Bass Guitar, Vocals
- Gallimore Sutherland - Rhythm Guitar, Vocals
- Lloyd Parks - Bass
- "Sly" Dunbar - Drums
- Uziah "Sticky" Thompson
- Ansel Collins - Keyboards
- Earl "Wire" Lindo - Synthesizer
- Errol Thompson - Engineer
- Joe Gibbs - Mixing
- Cooke Key - Sleeve
