= Trenchtown Mix Up =

Studio album by The Gladiators
- Released: 1976 (CD Reissue: 2000)
- Recorded: 1976, Joe Gibbs Studio
- Genre: Roots Reggae
- Length: 33:38
- Label: TR International / Virgin, LP V2062 / CDFL 10
- Producer: "Prince" Tony Robinson

The Gladiators chronology
Trenchtown Mix Up (1976)	Proverbial Reggae (1978)

Professional ratings
Review scores
Source	Rating
Allmusic	5/5 stars

Trenchtown Mix Up was The Gladiators' debut LP, recorded at Joe Gibbs' studio and released in 1976 on TR International/Virgin Records'. It included re-recordings of two songs originally recorded at Studio One ("Mix Up", originally titled "Bongo Red", and their 1968 debut release "Hello Carol"), and also included cover versions of Bob Marley's "Soul Rebel" and "Rude Boy Ska". Jo-Ann Greene, writing for Allmusic, said of the album: "Everything about this set is masterful, and it remains a classic".

== Track listing ==
_{All songs by Albert Griffiths unless noted.}

Side one

1. "Mix Up" - 3.00
2. "Bellyfull" - 2.18
3. "Looks is Deceiving" - 2.30
4. "Chatty Chatty Mouth" - 3.16
5. "Soul Rebel" - 3.54 (Bob Marley)

Side two

1. "Eli Eli" - 3.03
2. "Hearsay" - 3.06
3. "Rude Boy Ska" - 2.26 (Bob Marley)
4. "Know Yourself Mankind" - 2.50
5. "Thief in the Night" - 3.39
6. "Hello Carol" - 3.36

== Personnel ==
- "Prince" Tony Robinson - Producer
- Albert Griffiths - Lead Guitar, Vocals
- Clinton Fearon - Bass Guitar, Vocals
- Gallimore Sutherland - Rhythm Guitar, Vocals
- Lloyd Parks - Bass
- "Sly" Dunbar - Drums
- Uziah "Sticky" Thompson - Percussion
