= Serious Thing =

Studio album by The Gladiators
- Released: 1984
- Recorded: Harry J's Recording Studio
- Label: Nighthawk Records
- Producer: Leroy Pierson, Bob Schoenfeld

The Gladiators chronology
Reggae To Bone (1982)	Serious Thing (1984)	Show Down Vol. 3 (1984)

Professional ratings
Review scores
Source	Rating
AllMusic	4/5 stars
The Encyclopedia of Popular Music	2/5 stars

Serious Thing is a roots reggae album by Jamaican group the Gladiators, released in 1984 on Nighthawk Records.

== Track listing ==
No.	Title	Length
1.	"Serious Thing"	2:44
2.	"My Thoughts"	4:06
3.	"My Thoughts Version"	3:35
4.	"Fling it Gimme"	3:00
5.	"Rearrange"	3:42
6.	"Mid-Range"	2:57
7.	"Mid-Range Version"	3:05
8.	"Freedom Train"	3:18
9.	"Good Foundation"	3:42
10.	"After You"	2:17

== Personnel ==
- Albert Griffiths – Vocals, rhythm guitar
- Clinton Fearon – Background vocals, bass guitar
- Gallimore Sutherland – Background vocals, rhythm guitar
- Clinton Rufus – Lead guitar
- Audley Taylor – Keyboard
- Stanley "Barnabas" Bryan – Drums
- Richard Ace – Keyboard
- Scully – Percussion
- Bobby Ellis – Trumpet
- Deadly Headley, Dean Fraser, Glen DaCosta – Saxophone
- Ronald "Nambo" Robinson – Trombone
- David Madden – Trumpet
- Andy Bassford – Guitar

Technical

- Leroy Pierson, Bob Schoenfeld – Production
- Sylvan Morris – Recording, mixing

Artistic

- Jan Rosamond – design
