= The Mighty Two (compilation album) =

Compilation album by Joe Gibbs & Errol Thompson
- Released: January 1, 1992
- Genre: Reggae
- Label: Heartbeat Records
- Producers: Errol Thompson, Joe Gibbs
- Compiler: Chris Wilson

The Mighty Two is a compilation album by producer Joe Gibbs and engineer Errol Thompson, released in 1992.

It was rated 4.5 stars by AllMusic, noting "The Mighty Two had a versatile, organic quality that was rhythm-driven but song-oriented."

== Track listing ==
1. "Rent Man / Resident Area" - Black Uhuru / Jah Grundy – 7:18
2. "Heavy Manners" - Prince Far-I – 3:16
3. "Rockers" - Glen Washington – 2:34
4. "Rockers Dub" - Joe Gibbs and The Professionals – 2:45
5. "Navel String" - Dennis Walks – 3:14
6. "Band Yu Belly" - The Ethiopian – 3:10
7. "Maga Dog" (Version Two) - Peter Tosh – 2:44
8. "Money in My Pocket / Cool Running" - Dennis Brown/Prince Mohammed – 7:47
9. "Natty Pass Him GCE" - Shorty The President – 3:28
10. "A Win Them" - Leo Graham – 4:01
11. "Heart and Soul" - Junior Byles – 3:01
12. "Burn Babylon" - Sylford Walker – 6:40
13. "Ghetto Living" - The Mighty Diamonds – 3:37
14. "In a Jah Children" - Dhaima – 4:09
15. "Things Not So Nice" - Ronald & Karl – 3:01
16. "Dem a Pyaka" - Culture – 3:40
17. "Ram It" - Kojak and Liza – 3:32

== Personnel ==
- Lloyd Parks – bass
- Robert Shakespeare - bass
- George Fullwood – bass
- Sly Dunbar – drums
- Mikey "Boo" Richards – drums
- Leroy "Horsemouth" Wallace – drums
- Neville Grant – drums
- Carlton Barrett – drums
- Willie Lindo – guitar
- Winston "Bopeep" Bowen – guitar
- Valentine "Tony" Chin – guitar
- Earl "Chinna" Smith – guitar
- Winston Wright – keyboards
- Franklyn "Bubbler" Waul – keyboards
- Harold Butler – keyboards – keyboards
- Errol "Tarzan" Nelson – keyboards
- Keith Sterling – keyboards
- Gladstone Anderson – keyboards
- Dean Fraser - saxophone
- Ronald "Nambo" Robinson - trombone
- Herman Marquis – saxophone
- Vincent Gordon - trombone
- Tommy McCook - horns
- Bobby Ellis - trumpet
- Uziah "Sticky" Thompson – percussion
- Ruddy Thomas – percussion
