= Roots Reggae Library =

Music website

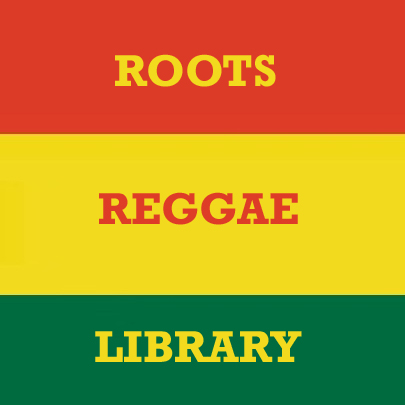
- Official Roots Reggae Library logo
- Available in: English
- Creator: (Netherlands) Anton Eise de Vries
- Editor: (Netherlands) Anton Eise de Vries
- Website: www.roots-reggae-library.com
- Launched: May 2012

The Roots Reggae Library is a website that lists reviews of discographies of reggae artists. It contains detailed written descriptions of albums, songs and the style of the artist. There are currently 33 discographies on the website. The content of the website consists of information on a large range of albums within the reggae genre, some of which are extremely rare and hard to get elsewhere. A number of artists discographies are uniquely indexed and/or newly created. Songs with lyrics other than English are interpreted in English. This is done in collaboration with various people around the world.

== History ==
The Roots Reggae Library was started in May 2012 as an initiative to index, store and analyse reggae music, with a particular emphasis on the transition period of rocksteady into roots reggae. Although the first edition published in May 2012 focused on Bob Marley, the author communicated his intent to dedicate special attention to other musicians besides “the King of Reggae”. The primary focus of the Roots Reggae Library is to create a single library of both Jamaican and non-Jamaican reggae music.

The initial name of the website was This Is Crucial Reggae. It was changed to Roots Reggae Library in order to prevent confusion with the This Is Crucial Reggae series that features best of albums of reggae artists.

== Content ==
The slogan of the Roots Reggae Library is "read, listen, collect". The website provides descriptions and reviews of albums, as well as individual songs. The library is a growing collection of reggae music, including descriptions of rare albums and artists. In recent times it has aimed to add hard to find African reggae records.

The Roots Reggae Library brings forth a unique index of the music from The Wailers, drawn from the period prior to their signing to Island Records and the release of Catch a Fire. The music of The Wailers has been categorized into 17 albums, of which 6 are predominantly from the 1963–1967 ska period and 11 from the 1968–1972 rocksteady period. In a similar fashion, the singles recorded by The Tartans are compiled into two albums. The library has compiled three albums of the Twinkle Brothers with songs not previously released on albums. Two albums of The Congos featuring various other artists were indexed. There are also two Steel Pulse albums made, of which one is an album with collaborations with other artists, similar to those albums described by The Congos. Single new albums of Ijahman Levi, Judy Mowatt, The Abyssinians, The Gladiators and Talisman can be found. These albums vary in time frame, whereas some are collections of recently released singles, others go further back in time to include singles that were not released on any album.

Besides those mentioned above, other editions have featured well known artists such as Peter Tosh and Bunny Wailer. The list of Jamaican artists on the website is long, including musicians such as Ijahman Levi, Prince Lincoln, The Congos, The Gladiators, the Twinkle Brothers, Israel Vibration, The Abyssinians and Judy Mowatt, the only female artist. There are various artists from other Caribbean islands, Africa, and artists from elsewhere with African or Caribbean roots.

The discographies described on the website are generally the original albums released by the artists, with the addition of singles and outtakes. This has been done in an attempt to create a full index of the discography of each artist and to describe everything an artist has ever released in studio.

== YouTube ==
The YouTube Channel of This Is Crucial Reggae was initiated in October 2012. Although far from representing the current YouTube channel of the Roots Reggae Library, it provided a fundamental step to create the current concept. Initially all library's music was available on YouTube in order for people to listen to what had been reviewed on the Roots Reggae Library website. However, the author announced in December 2015 that albums will no longer be uploaded in order to refrain from breaking copyright regulations. Instead the channel will host a single video per artist or group to account for their discography, highlighting extras and rarities.

== Index ==
Artist / Band	Country	Date Published	Albums	Songs	Playing Time	Website Tab	Publishing Location
Bob Marley	Jamaica	2012/05	9	107	06:49:24	1	Groningen, Netherlands
Peter Tosh	Jamaica	2012/06	10	109	07:56:31	2	Groningen, Netherlands
Prince Lincoln	Jamaica	2012/07	6	65	05:09:43	4	Bennekom, Netherlands
Black Roots	England	2012/10	7	87	05:37:17	20	Windhoek, Namibia
Talisman	England	2012/10	5	38	02:50:09	21	Windhoek, Namibia
The Gladiators	Jamaica	2012/12	28	305	18:20:14	13	Lubango, Angola
The Wailers	Jamaica	2013/03	17	255	12:04:18	10	Jitra, Malaysia
The Tartans	Jamaica	2014/06	2	18	00:49:51	11	Jitra, Malaysia
The Congos	Jamaica	2014/10	15	197	13:47:06	12	Jitra, Malaysia
Steel Pulse	England	2014/11	13	157	11:16:03	19	Jitra, Malaysia
Israel Vibration	Jamaica	2014/12	18	206	14:41:14	8	Jitra, Malaysia
Alpha Blondy	Ivory Coast	2015/01	17	195	14:20:41	28	Kuala Lumpur, Malaysia
The Abyssinians	Jamaica	2015/02	5	64	04:02:39	14	Jitra, Malaysia
Lucky Dube	South Africa	2015/08	18	183	12:28:43 *	22	Cruz das Almas, Brazil
Twinkle Brothers	Jamaica	2015/09	42	456	28:04:00	9	Cruz das Almas, Brazil
Edson Gomes	Brazil	2015/10	6	69	04:33:35	31	Cruz das Almas, Brazil
Bunny Wailer	Jamaica	2015/12	24	283	19:07:28	3	Jember, Indonesia
Ijahman Levi	Jamaica	2016/01	20	153	11:15:05	5	Jember, Indonesia
Judy Mowatt	Jamaica	2016/02	11	138	08:52:20	6	Sidoarjo, Indonesia
Max Adioa	Senegal	2016/06	2	18	01:16:10	29	Jember, Indonesia
Reggae Muntu	South Africa	2016/07	1	6	00:28:20	24	Jember, Indonesia
Joe Silo	South Africa	2016/07	1	8	00:32:17	25	Jember, Indonesia
Joe Gad	South Africa	2017/01	1	8	00:29:33	26	Ilagan, Philippines
José Carlos	South Africa	2017/01	1	8	00:33:49	27	Ilagan, Philippines
Sipho Johnson	South Africa	2017/02	6	51	04:10:09	23	Singapore, Singapore
Adams Junior	Niger	2017/02	1	7	00:30:52	30	Singapore, Singapore
Joe Yamanaka	Japan	2017/02	4	35	02:29:30	32	Singapore, Singapore
Jah Big	United States	2017/02	1	9	00:40:05	33	Singapore, Singapore
The Visionaires	Jamaica	2017/02	1	10	00:32:11	15	Singapore, Singapore
African Brothers	Jamaica	2017/02	2	30	01:41:13	16	Singapore, Singapore
Ossie Dellimore	Saint Vincent	2017/03	2	21	01:30:49	17	Singapore, Singapore
Donald Davidson	Jamaica	2017/06	1	10	00:43:58	7	Santiago de los Caballeros, Dominican Republic
Collective Security	Dominica	2017/07	2	18	01:10:03	18	Santiago de los Caballeros, Dominican Republic

-* Playing time excluding 'Ngikwethembe Na', which is at the top of the Roots Reggae Library wishlist
