= Cow Thief Skank =

Single by the Upsetters
- B-side: "7¾ Skank"
- Released: 1973
- Genre: Reggae; megamix; experimental
- Length: 3:31
- Label: Justice League; Upsetter
- Songwriter(s): Lee Perry
- Producer(s): Perry

"Cow Thief Skank" is a 1973 single written and produced by Jamaican reggae musician Lee Perry and credited to his studio band the Upsetters. Released in Jamaica through Justice League and in the United Kingdom through Upsetter Records, it is one of Perry's series of 'skank' singles and is a duet between him and deejay Charlie Ace. The song was written as a diss track against fellow producer Niney the Observer, mocking an incident in Niney's youth where his thumb was cut off by a farmer after he attempted to steal one of his cows.

"Cow Thief Skank" is notable for its collage-laden production, which utilised a bricolage and studio-as-instrument approach; Perry samples four other tracks – several bars of a song by the Staple Singers and rhythms from three of his own productions – for the record's music using reel-to-reel tape recordings. This cut-up technique has been described as a precursor to the invention of the sampler and the use of sampling in electronic music and breakbeats and scratching in hip hop music. "Cow Thief Skank" has also been described as an early megamix, due to how it stitches together a selection of Perry's earlier records. The single's B-side, "7¾ Skank", is a "dissociated" version of the A-side.

== Writing and recording ==
=== Composition ===
"Cow Thief Skank" was one of several 'skank' tracks produced by Perry in the era, others including "Bathroom Skank" and "Kentucky Skank". According to writer Paul Sullivan, "Cow Thief Skank" was part of a series of 'skank' tracks, alongside "Bucky Skank" and "IPA Skank", that King Tubby mixed for Perry.

A duet between Lee Perry and deejay Charlie Ace, "Cow Thief Skank" is a diss track against record producer Niney the Observer, who was feuding with Perry at the time. The song mocks Niney and references an incident in his youth, when his thumb and finger were cut off by a farmer after his tried to steal one of his cows. The song refers to Niney as Moccasin, a reference to his preference for cheap shoes. According to biographer David Katz, Perry and Ace suggest that Niney's missing thumb "came from retribution for the attempted theft of a cow, Ace taunting Niney as the one to 'take out the shitty-shitty pail' when incarcerated, as Perry bellows, 'Go back to Lucea!' with absurd mooing sounds heightening the insults." Niney responded to the song with good humour, later commenting that although he and Perry used to have "musters", they were ultimately friends.

=== Production ===
The track is distinctive for its composite composition, splicing together the rhythms from three different Upsetters tracks to create a new recording. It begins with several bars of the Staple Singers' "This Old Town (People in this Town)" (1972), secretly lifted directly from the original record, before prefacing a portion of the Inspirations' Perry-produced "Stand by Me" (1968); the rest of the track then alternates between "dubbed-out" sections of two 1973 tracks, namely the Carlton's "Better Days" and "Musical Transplant" (the Upsetters' recut of Ernie Smith's "Pitta Patta"). Chris Willman of The Mercury News contextualised the "influential" track within Perry's career, noting that in the early 1970s, the producer had begun "concentrating more on the art of remixing, toasting over his studio creations". Marcus Boon considers the cow sounds on the track to exemplify "the use of collage and editing in Jamaican reggae." David Toop, writing in The Wire, commented that unlike many other dub mixers, Perry "disrupted his more commercial songs with dub effects", citing "Cow Thief Skank" (as well as "Bathroom Skank" and "Police and Thieves") as examples.

The composite style of production is even more evident on the single's B-side, "7¾ Skank", a "dissociated version" of the A-side. Katz comments that whereas the A-side version is dominated by Perry and Ace's berating of Niney for "thieving a black-and-white cow while sporting inferior footwear", the B-side version more specifically highlights the "cut-up experiment", adding that it chops and changes "between 'Musical Transplant' and 'Better Days' after having gotten through snatches of 'This Old Town' and 'Stand By Me.' No one else in Jamaica was making anything even remotely close like this at the time, making it another one-off piece of Perry creativity."

== Release and availability ==
"Cow Thief Skank" was released in 1973 as a 45 rpm single with "7¾ Skank" on the B-side; it was issued in Jamaica through Justice League and in the United Kingdom through Upsetter Records. According to Adam Bhala Lough of online magazine Passion of the Weiss, the single was a hit success. Michael de Koningh writes that the "mad" track was ultimately one of several of Perry's "beloved skanks" issued by Trojan Records (the distributor of the Upsetter imprint), another being "Jungle Lion" (1973). A contemporary review in Westminster and Pimlico News grouped it alongside Tommy McCook and Bob Ellis' collaborative single "Bad Cow Skank" as farm-related reggae songs. "Cow Thief Skank" has since been included on several compilation albums of Perry's work, including Archive (1998), The Upsetter: Essential Madness from the Scratch Files (2000), The Wonderman Years (2002), The Upsetter Collection: A Lee Perry Jukebox (2007), and King Scratch (Musical Masterpieces from the Upsetter Ark-ive) (2022). It also features on Complete UK Upsetter Singles Collection Vol 4 (2003).

== Legacy ==
=== Production and influence ===
According to Katz, "Cow Thief Skank" was unique and marked "another Perry first in the history of recorded sound", adding that its "cut-up technique" was "not adapted by others in reggae and it pre-dates similar techniques used in new wave and hip-hop by many years, despite the technical limitations of the equipment at Perry's disposal." According to Dave Sullivan, the single was groundbreaking for splicing together "no fewer than three different Upsetters rhythms several years before samplers were invented." Randall Roberts, writing for the Los Angeles Times and Yahoo! News, considers the song to exemplify Perry's studio experimentation, writing that "he merged reel-to-reel tapes of two different rhythm tracks to create a third." In an article for Passion of the Weiss, Lough considers the "brilliant" track to be among Perry's most mysterious, adding: "The beat is formed from 3 songs cut-up together – the first time in history that had ever been done before. This was 1973, many years before these techniques would be utilized in hip hop."

David Stelfox of Pitchfork wrote that the track's "bricolage of several different songs" can be viewed as a precursor to the use of sampling in electronic music, and hip hop music's recontextualisation of breakbeats, although he considers this legacy to be undercut by how "the record's sole point was to take the piss out of fellow sound man Niney the Observer's shoes." The Guardian writer Sean O'Hagan saw the song as exemplifying Perry's nascent experimentation with post-production, commenting that the single "prefigures hip-hop's later excursions into scratching and mixing by cutting between the beats of two separate songs while Perry raps freestyle over the resulting new rhythm."

Martin C. Strong considers it to be "the first hip-hop 'scratch' record", noting that Perry and Ace "[rap] over the track that cuts between the beats of two different songs." Similarly, Dave Thompson writes that the track originated "the hip hop practice of 'scratching'" as it "featured the vocal track leaping between two separate backing tracks." Colin Larkin calls it a "unique and bizarre cut-and-mix extravaganza" that Perry produced for Charlie Ace. As Jonathan Takiff of Philadelphia Daily News comments, the track is often considered to be "the first hip-hop-style record", for its cutting of separate, purloined breaks and beats. Michaelangelo Matos of Rolling Stone writes that although Perry, as a pioneer of dub, had already "invented the remix", "Cow Thief Skank" is a "bizarre tape-cut extravaganza" which was possibly the first ever megamix, due to the haphazard but hypnotic manner in which Perry "stitches together a handful of his own grooves" (chiefly, the Upsetters' "Bucky Skank").

=== Reappraisal ===
Richie Unterberger, in an AllMusic review of The Upsetter: Essential Madness from the Scratch Files, writes that "Cow Thief Skank" is overwhelmed by mooing cows, "in tandem with unfathomable raps and chord changes that sound like they've been spliced in from a different record altogether". He called it "the zaniest effort" on the compilation, "and, therefore, about as zany as anything in popular music." Reviewing The Wonderman Years for Pitchfork, Chris Dahlen wrote that "the echoed intonations that introduce the more skewed studio elements" in numerous of Perry's skank tracks, including "Cow Thief skank", are "most prophetic". He added that such tracks are among Perry's best early works and "point the way into the future of the genre, and remixing in general, insofar as all the sounds are fair game for tweaking." In 1999, Muzik described "Cow Thief Skank" as "pretty much as mad as [Perry] was", commenting that "it's full of absolutely bonkers noises and mooing. You can trust pretty much anything Lee Perry's touched."

On The Upsetter Selection, "Cow Thief Skank" is one of three skanks (along with "Bathroom Skank" and "Kentucky Skank") which commence the second disc. In his review for Plan B, Everett True considered them to be the most astounding tracks on the album, highlighting "the concrete tape edits" of "Cow Thief Skank" for being "close to Faust territory". Reviewing the compilation for Pitchfork, Stelfox wrote that the three skanks were "almost confrontationally experimental for their time" and "remain mind-blowing": He wrote: "Packed with torrential collages of effects, they're perfect examples of the studio-as-instrument approach to production." In 2014, Fact included the "Cow Thief Skank"/"7¾ Skank" single in their list of "Perry's 10 best deep cuts". In 2021, Rolling Stone included "Cow Thief Skank" in their list of Perry's "10 Essential Songs"; contributor Matos commented: "Its try-anything sensibility and random mooing make it one of a kind." Despite being a single, "Cow Thief Skank" was ranked eighth in Uncut's 2017 list of "The 101 Weirdest Albums of All Time"; contributor Neil Spencer wrote that the single was "extraordinary even by Scratch's nutty standards", due to how it cuts up a "clattering" Upsetters rhythm, mooing cows and "threats to 'chop off the hand' of Niney".

== Personnel ==
- Lee Perry – lyrics, production, toasting
- Charlie Ace – toasting
