= Ansel Collins =

- Born: 1949 (age 76–77); Kingston, Jamaica
- Genres: Reggae
- Occupations: Musician, singer, songwriter, producer
- Instrument: Keyboards
- Years active: 1960s–present

Ansel Collins (born 1949) is a Jamaican musician, singer, songwriter and producer, best known for his work with Dave Barker as Dave and Ansel Collins.

== Biography ==
Born 1949 in Kingston, Jamaica, Collins began his career as a drummer, moving to keyboards in the mid-1960s. In the late 1960s, he performed with the Invincibles band (whose members also included Lloyd Parks, Sly Dunbar and Ranchie McLean. He played on the Maytals' "Pressure Drop" and "Sweet and Dandy". After working with Lee "Scratch" Perry, Collins was part of the duo Dave and Ansel Collins along with Dave Barker, with whom he had a number one hit in the United Kingdom in 1971 with "Double Barrel". His keyboard playing exemplified the Skinhead reggae style. Collins is also a producer and has released solo records, including single sides "Cock Robin", "Atlantic One", "Stalag" and "Nuclear Weapon" between 1969 and 1971, as well as a handful of later albums. He was a member of 1970s Channel One studio band the Revolutionaries, as well as the Impact All Stars and Sugar Minott's Black Roots Players, performing on many of the classic songs of the roots reggae era (album 1979 Black Roots). He was also part of Jimmy Cliff's backing band, Oneness, in the 1970s. He continued to record during the 1980s, mainly as a session musician, and released a solo album in 1986.

He also worked with backing bands such as Lynn Taitt and the Jets (including the reggae producer Joe Gibbs). In the 1970s, he was the regular member of the backing band the Aggrovators and the band Soul Syndicate. In 1978, he was a member of the band the Gladiators (1978 album Proverbial Reggae).

He played keyboards on several albums of various musicians, including on Scientist's Scientist Rids the World of the Evil Curse of the Vampires and Scientist in the Kingdom of Dub (1981), Rico Rodriguez's Man from Wareika (1977), Lincoln Thompson's Natural Wild (1980), Augustus Pablo's This Is Augustus Pablo (1974), Black Uhuru's Sinsemilla (1980) and Chill Out (1982), Jimmy Cliff's Give Thankx (1978), King Tubby and Prince Jammy's His Majesty's Dub (1976), Cliff Hanger (1985) and Humanitarian (1999), the Royals' Pick Up the Pieces (1977), Mighty Diamonds' Right Time (1976), Gregory Isaacs' Cool Ruler (1978), Prince Far I's Health and Strength (1998), and Serge Gainsbourg's Aux armes et cætera (1979). In the mid-1970s, reggae band Culture began working with some of the premier musicians of the time including Collins, Robbie Shakespeare, Sly Dunbar, Cedric Brooks and the ever-present percussionist Sticky. Collins worked with guitarist Earl "Chinna" Smith and with deejay Errol Scorcher on a series of recordings including "Mosquitoes", which was also a hit.

Roots reggae singer I Wayne was raised by his aunt and her husband Ansel Collins.

== Discography ==
=== Albums ===
- Double Barrel (1971) Trojan (Dave and Ansel Collins)
- Riding High (1977) Shelly Power
- So Long (1978)
- Ansel Collins (1986) Heartbeat
- Jamaican Gold (2002) Moll Selekta (Ansel Collins/Sly & Robbie)
