= Honeysett =

Honeysett is a surname. Notable people with the surname include:

- John Honeysett (1938–2018), English greyhound trainer
- Martin Honeysett (1943–2015), English cartoonist and illustrator
- Troy Honeysett, Australian actor

== See also ==
- Laurence Cane-Honeysett, British musician and journalist
