= Baby Wayne =

- Born: 13 December 1969
- Origin: St. Catherine, Jamaica
- Died: 28 October 2005 (aged 37)
- Genres: Dancehall
- Instrument: vocals
- Years active: 1990s
- Labels: Heartbeat, VP

Baby Wayne (13 December 1969 – 28 October 2005), born Wayne Parkinson, was a Jamaican dancehall artist known for his conscientious lyrics.

== Biography ==
Parkinson was born in 1968 in Saint Catherine Parish, Jamaica. He initially became known for his conscientious lyrics, warning of the perils of a life of crime, which were unusual at the time, although he later recorded some tracks that made concessions to the slackness that was popular with audiences. He worked with producers Steely & Clevie in the early 1990s, with whom he had a hit in 1991 with "Mama". Other hits from the early 1990s included "Road Mi Waan Come" and "Warder". In 1993 he recorded "Mi Know Mi Fren" with Leroy Smart (produced by Winston "Niney" Holness), which was a top ten hit in Jamaica. Holness secured a deal for Wayne with Heartbeat Records for the release of his debut album, Ram DJ, in 1994. The album included guest appearances from Sugar Minott and Dennis Brown. In 1995 he worked with producer Lloyd Dennis and had further success with "Tongue Make Not".

He died on 28 October 2005 at the Kingston Public Hospital from complications of pneumonia, leaving seven children.

== Discography ==
- Ram DJ (1994) Heartbeat
- Move With the Crowd (1995) VP
