= The Mighty Two =

The Mighty Two may refer to:

- The Mighty Two (compilation album), a 1992 reggae compilation album
- The Mighty Two (Louis Bellson and Gene Krupa album), 1963
