= Larry Marshall (singer) =

- Born: Fitzroy Marshall; 17 December 1941; St. Ann, Jamaica
- Died: 24 August 2017 (aged 75) Miami, Florida, United States
- Genres: Ska, rocksteady, reggae
- Occupations: Singer-songwriter, studio engineer, arranger
- Years active: 1962–2017
- Labels: Studio One, Heartbeat

Larry Marshall (born Fitzroy Marshall; 17 December 1941 – 24 August 2017) was a Jamaican reggae singer, who recorded both as a solo artist and as part of the duos Larry & Alvin and Larry & Enid.

== Early life ==
Marshall was born in Lawrence Park in Saint Ann Parish in 1941. He left St. Ann in 1957 and travelled to Kingston.

== Career ==
Marshall's musical career stretches back to the early 1960s, his initial inspiration being Ben E. King. Between 1962 and 1967, he had minor hits for producers such as E. Henry ("Too Young To Love"), Philip Yap ("Promise Is a Comfort to a Fool" and "Snake In The Grass"), Coxsone Dodd ("Please Stay"), and Prince Buster ("I've Got Another Girl" and "Suspicion"). His greatest successes came in the late 1960s when he teamed up with Alvin Leslie in the duo Larry & Alvin, recording hits for Dodd's Studio One label (where he had been working as an assistant engineer) such as the massive Jamaican hit "Nanny Goat" which is regarded as the record that began the shift from rocksteady to reggae, followed by "Hush Up", "Your Love", and "Mean Girl". "Throw Me Corn" also became a big hit in Jamaica when released in 1971. Marshall also recorded as a duo with Enid Cumberland, as Larry & Enid. In the early 1970s, Marshall worked for Studio One as assistant studio engineer to Sylvan Morris, writer, arranger, and dub-plate seller, and the label released a compilation of his recordings, Presenting Larry Marshall, in 1973. While at Studio One, Marshall arranged several recordings by Burning Spear, and also provided backing vocals. Morris left Studio One in 1974, prompting Dodd to offer the chief engineer job to Marshall, but he declined the offer, unhappy with the wages. After leaving Studio One in 1974, he released the 1975 single "I Admire You", followed by an album of the same name. The dub version on the b-side of the single was one of the first to be credited to King Tubby. Marshall released several singles in the mid-1980s produced by Gussie Clarke, including remakes of "Throw Me Corn" and "I Admire You", and released further albums in the late 1980s and early 1990s. Marshall also provided backing vocals on Junior Byles' 1986 album Rasta No Pickpocket.

== Personal life ==
Marshall moved to Miami, and having not received significant financial reward for his musical career, supported himself by working on building sites. He continued to record occasionally. He died at his home in Miami on 24 August 2017, aged 75, from complications of Alzheimer's disease, from which he had suffered for ten years.

Marshall was a cousin of Aston Barrett and Carlton Barrett, best known as members of the Wailers Band.

== Albums ==
- Presenting Larry Marshall (1973), Studio One (reissued (1992), Heartbeat)
- I Admire You (1975), Black and White/Marshall/See Me Yah (reissued (1992), Heartbeat)
- Dance With Me Across The Floor (1988), Conqueror
- Come Let Us Reason (1992), King's Music Records
- In Jah Corn Field
- Golden Hits (1998), Discotex
- I Admire You in Dub (2000), Motion (with King Tubby)
- Throw Mi Corn Original Music
