= His Majesty's Dub =

His Majestys Dub

Studio album by King Tubby & Prince Jammy
- Released: 1983
- Recorded: 1976
- Studio: Channel One Studios; Joe Gibbs Studio; Randy's Studio
- Genre: Dub
- Label: Sky Juice
- Producer: Neville Beckford

His Majestys Dub is a 1983 dub album by King Tubby and Prince Jammy, sometimes credited to Prince Jammy v King Tubbys. It featured Carlton Barrett and Sly Dunbar on drums, Robbie Shakespeare and Aston Barrett on bass guitar, and Ansel Collins on keyboards, among other personnel. The album was produced by Jah Woosh and engineered by King Tubby and Prince Jammy, along with Maxie and frequent collaborator Errol Thompson. The album was recorded at Randy's in Kingston, Jamaica.

The material included dub versions of Bim Sherman's "What Sweet You So", Jah Woosh's "Jah Is the Ruler" and Joseph Earlocks' "Free Up the Blackman".

Like many other dub and reggae records, this album has been (re)released on several different labels with several different covers.

== LP track listing ==
Track listing taken from Sky Juice SJLP003.

Side one

1. "Throne of Judgement"
2. "Ruling Power"
3. "Lion Heart"
4. "His Majesty"
5. "King of Kings"

Side two

1. "Thunder Shock"
2. "Ethiopia Rock"
3. "King Tubby's Salute"
4. "Jah Works"

== Personnel ==
- Aston "Family Man" Barrett – bass guitar
- Robbie Shakespeare – bass guitar
- Errol "Flabba" Holt - bass guitar
- Carlton Barrett – drums
- Sly Dunbar – drums
- Style Scott - drums
- Radcliffe "Dougie" Bryan - lead guitar
- Winston "Boo Pee" Bowen - lead guitar
- Eric "Bingy Bunny" Lamont - rhythm guitar
- Noel "Sowell" Bailey - rhythm guitar
- Ansel Collins - keyboards
- Theophilus "Snapping" Beckford - keyboards
- Gladstone "Gladdy" Anderson - keyboards
- Bobby Ellis - trumpet
- Vin Gordon - trombone
- Bongo Herman - percussion
- Noel "Scully" Simms - percussion

Technical

- King Tubby - engineer
- Prince Jammy - engineer
- Errol Thompson - engineer
- Lancelot "Maxie" McKenzie - engineer
- Sharron Lea - cover design

Remixed at King Tubby's Studio, Kingston, Jamaica
"Special thanks to the singers and players who helped to make this album possible. Special request to the Secta Posse"
