= Junior Byles =

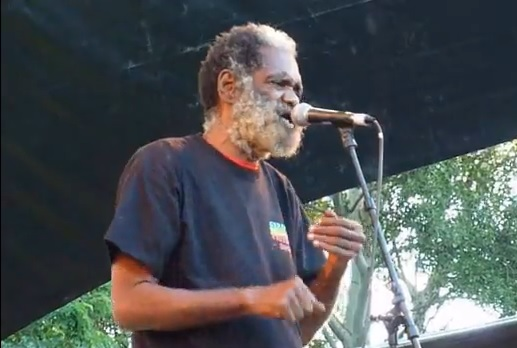
- Byles in 2010

Background information
- Also known as: King Chubby
- Born: Kenneth Thaddeus William Byles Jr. 2 February 1948; Kingston, Jamaica
- Died: 15 May 2025 (aged 77)
- Genres: Reggae, rocksteady, ska
- Occupation: Singer-songwriter
- Instrument: Vocals
- Years active: 1967–2025
- Labels: Blood and Fire,Randy's Records, Dip Records, Love Power, Magnet, Trojan, Upsetter Records, Justice League,Joe Gibbs' Music, Well Charge, Ja-Man Records, Niney the Observer Label, Duke Reid's Treasure Isle, Morwell Esq., Errol T Records, Black Wax, Micron, Orchid, Nighthawk, Heartbeat

Kenneth Byles (2 February 1948 – 15 May 2025), also known as "Junior Byles", "Chubby", or "King Chubby", was a foundation conscious roots reggae singer from Jamaica.

== Life and career ==
=== The Versatiles ===
Named after his father Kenneth Snr, Kenneth Byles Jr. was born at Jubilee Hospital in Kingston, and grew up in the city's Jonestown, where his father worked as a mechanic, and his mother as a schoolteacher. His family were devoutly religious, and his early musical education came from singing in church. He formed the vocal trio The Versatiles in 1967, along with Dudley Earl and Ben 'Louis' Davis, while also working as a firefighter. Lee "Scratch" Perry, then working as chief engineer at Joe Gibbs' studio, was scouting for talent for Gibbs' new Amalgamated label, and spotted the group while they were auditioning for the 1967 Festival Song Contest with "The Time Has Come". Perry signed the group to the label, but left Gibbs soon after. The Versatiles stayed with Gibbs for two years, before moving to work with Perry, and then to Duke Reid's Treasure Isle label, also recording for other producers such as Laurel Aitken. The group split up in 1970, with Byles still working as a firefighter but continuing to record solo for Perry (sometimes with the other former-Versatiles providing harmonies).

=== Solo peak ===
When Perry's association with Bob Marley came to an end, he sought a singer-songwriter to work with who would fill the void, and Byles fit the bill. With Perry, Byles had a minor hit with "What's The World Coming To", released under the name King Chubby, and over the next five years the partnership would result in some of Perry's most highly regarded work, with Byles' Rastafarian beliefs clearly evident, including "Beat Down Babylon", "King of Babylon", and the plea for repatriation, "Place Called Africa". "Rub Up Festival" was Byles' entry for the Festival Song Contest in 1971, but the song's suggestive lyric led to it being disqualified after reaching the final eight. The following year's "Festival Da Da" fared better, finishing as second runner-up. Also in 1972, Byles began self-producing, and set up his Love Power label, releasing singles such as "Black Crisis" and "Our Mistakes".

Byles was one of several reggae musicians to offer support to Michael Manley's 1972 general election campaign, releasing the singles "Joshua Desire" and "Pharaoh Hiding" ("Joshua" referring to Manley and "Pharaoh" to the ruling Jamaican Labour Party's leader Hugh Shearer). Manley was elected, but improvements for Jamaica's poor were not immediately apparent, and Byles was one of several artists who had supported Manley who voiced dissent, releasing the scathing "When Will Better Come?". At the end of 1972, Byles had his biggest hit to date, with a cover version of Peggy Lee's "Fever", with a dubby rhythm produced by Perry. November 1972 saw the release of Byles debut album, Beat Down Babylon, which along with a series of singles that followed, established Byles as a major force in Jamaica as well as establishing him with audiences in the United Kingdom, "Curley Locks" being particularly successful there. Produced by Perry, "Curley Locks" tells of two childhood sweethearts whose relationship is opposed by the girl's father after the boy grows dreadlocks. The song remained popular in Jamaican dancehalls for years. Byles moved away from Perry in the mid-1970s, recording three duets with Rupert Reid for Dudley Swaby and Leroy Hollett's Ja-Man label, as well as recording for Lloyd Campbell ("Bury-O-Boy") and Pete Weston (covers of The Temptations' "Ain't Too Proud To Beg" and The Folkes Brothers' "Oh Carolina").

Regarded by some as his greatest work, the Discomix "Fade Away" was recorded in 1975 with Earl "Chinna" Smith aka Earl Flute-Melchizedek the High Priest, Carlton "Santa" Davis and Leroy "Horsemouth" Wallace of The Soul Syndicate for producer Joseph Hoo Kim at his Channel One Studios. It was a massive hit in Jamaica and was also a big success in the UK, gaining regular play from Lloyd Coxsone and Jah Shaka sound systems, and, it was covered five years later by Adrian Sherwood's New Age Steppers collective, with backing by members of Creation Rebel. It also featured on the soundtrack for the film Rockers. He also released a second album, Jordan, in 1976, produced by Weston.

=== Health problems, later career and death ===
By 1975, Byles' health had begun to decline. Suffering from depression, he was deeply affected by the death of Haile Selassie, unable to reconcile this with his belief in Selassie's divinity, and attempted suicide. He was admitted to Bellevue Hospital, after which his health continued to decline. Although he had regular spells in the hospital, he continued to record, reworking "King of Babylon" for Winston Holness, working again with Campbell, and recording a cover of The Archies' "Sugar Sugar" with Big Youth. By the end of 1976, he had all but vanished from the music scene, with a comeback attempted in 1978, recording two singles for Joe Gibbs. It was clear that he was still not well, however, and it would be 1982 before he re-emerged, working with New York City label Wackie's. Progress on a planned new album was slow, and Byles was beset by tragedy when his mother died, and he lost his home in a fire. His wife and children also emigrated to the United States, and aside from a few singles, Byles would release nothing until 1986's Rasta No Pickpocket album. The album did not, however, see a long-lived upturn in Byles' fortunes, and by the following year, he was living on the street, scavenging for food in dumpsters, and begging from passers-by. Byles occasionally resurfaced, recording "Young Girl" for Holness in 1989, and "Little Fleego" three years later, and played a few live shows with Earl "Chinna" Smith in 1997 and 1998. He contributed to the Medicine I compilation album in 2000, and returned to live performance in 2004 in Jamaica, receiving positive reviews. This led to a short tour of the United Kingdom. His legacy of recordings from the 1970s, however, maintain his status as one of roots reggae's leading talents.

A diagnosis of prostate cancer and his ongoing mental health issues resulted in renewed attention in Jamaica toward Byles' health and musical legacy in the late 2010s. In early 2019, a benefit and celebratory concert took place, followed by a large cash donation to Byles from the charity foundation of dancehall artist Bounty Killer the following year.

Byles died on 15 May 2025, at the age of 77.

== Discography ==
=== Singles ===
- "Demonstration" aka "What's The World Coming To" (as King Chubby) (1970)
- "Da Da" (1971)
- "Beat Down Babylon" (1971) Upsetter
- "King of Babylon" (1972) Randy's
- "Fever"
- "Hail to the Power"
- "Our Mistakes" (1972) Love Power
- "Black Crisis" (1972) Love Power
- "A Long Way" (1973) Love Power
- "Curley Locks" (1974) Dip
- "Dreader Locks" (& Lee Perry) (1974) Dip
- "Curley Locks" (1974) Magnet
- "Gwane Joshua Gwane" (1974) Soul Beat/Jaguar
- "Bury O Boy" (1975) Ethnic Fight
- "Chant Down Babylon" (& Rupert Reid) (1976) Black Wax/Ja-Man
- "Pitchy Patchy" (1976) Black Wax
- "Fade Away" (1976) Eagle
- "Oh Carolina" (1976) Grounation
- "Run Run" (1976) Observer
- "Heart And Soul" (1976) Errol T
- "Can You Feel It?" (1976) Thing
- "Jordan" (1976) Thing
- "Better Be Careful" (1982) Carib Gems
- "Let Us Reason Now" (1989) One in Three
- "Weeping" (1977) The Thing

=== Albums ===
- Beat Down Babylon (1972) Dynamic/Trojan
- Jordan (1976) Micron
- Rasta No Pickpocket (1986) Nighthawk

Compilations

- Beat Down Babylon: The Upsetter Years (1987) Trojan
- When Will Better Come 1972–76 (1988) Trojan
- Curly Locks: Best of Junior Byles and The Upsetters 1970–76 (1997) Heartbeat
- 129 Beat Street Ja-Man Special 1975–1978 (1999) Blood & Fire
