= Laurence Cane-Honeysett =

British musician, producer and music journalist

Laurence Cane-Honeysett (born February 1961) is a British musician, producer and music journalist specialising in Jamaican music.

After studying design at Ealing College, London, he performed as a vocalist and guitarist with a number of groups, before working as an illustrator and music journalist, securing a position as the Jamaican music consultant for British music magazine, Record Collector.

In the early 1990s, he started working for Trojan Records and soon after joined the company on a full-time basis as its Jamaican music specialist, eventually overseeing the label's releases and all other aspects of its general running, a position he has since continued to hold.

He has also contributed work to a number of other record companies, including Castle Communications, See For Miles, Snapper Music, Westside, Vibrant, Future Noise, Secret Records, Spectrum, Caroline International, Cherry Red Records, Island Records and Music On Vinyl, while maintaining his position with Trojan Records.

In addition, over the past 15 years he has managed a number of other Jamaican music labels, most notably Pressure Drop, Sunrise Records and a relaunched version of Doctor Bird Records.

To date Cane-Honeysett has compiled and supervised in excess of 1,200 physical releases of which he has contributed sleeve notes for approximately 500, with the primary focus being Jamaican music, although other genres have included vintage rhythm and blues, 50s rock and roll and 1960s soul and pop.

Other work includes articles for Record Collector magazine and music consultant for a number of Jamaican music-themed radio and TV programmes, including Steve McQueen’s award winning Small Axe, while he still also occasionally contributes articles to Record Collector magazine.

In 2003 he co-wrote ‘Young, Gifted And Black: The Story Of Trojan Records’ with Michael de Koningh, while 15 years later he authored 'The Story Of Trojan Records' and 'Trojan: The Art Of The Album'.

== Bibliography ==
- Young, gifted and black : the story of Trojan Records / with Michael de Koningh, 2003, Sanctuary Publishing, UK, ISBN 1-86074-464-8
- The Story Of Trojan Records, 2018, Eye Books, UK, ISBN 9781785630781
- Trojan: The Art Of The Album, 2018, BMG, UK
