= The Gladiators (band) =

Jamaican roots reggae band

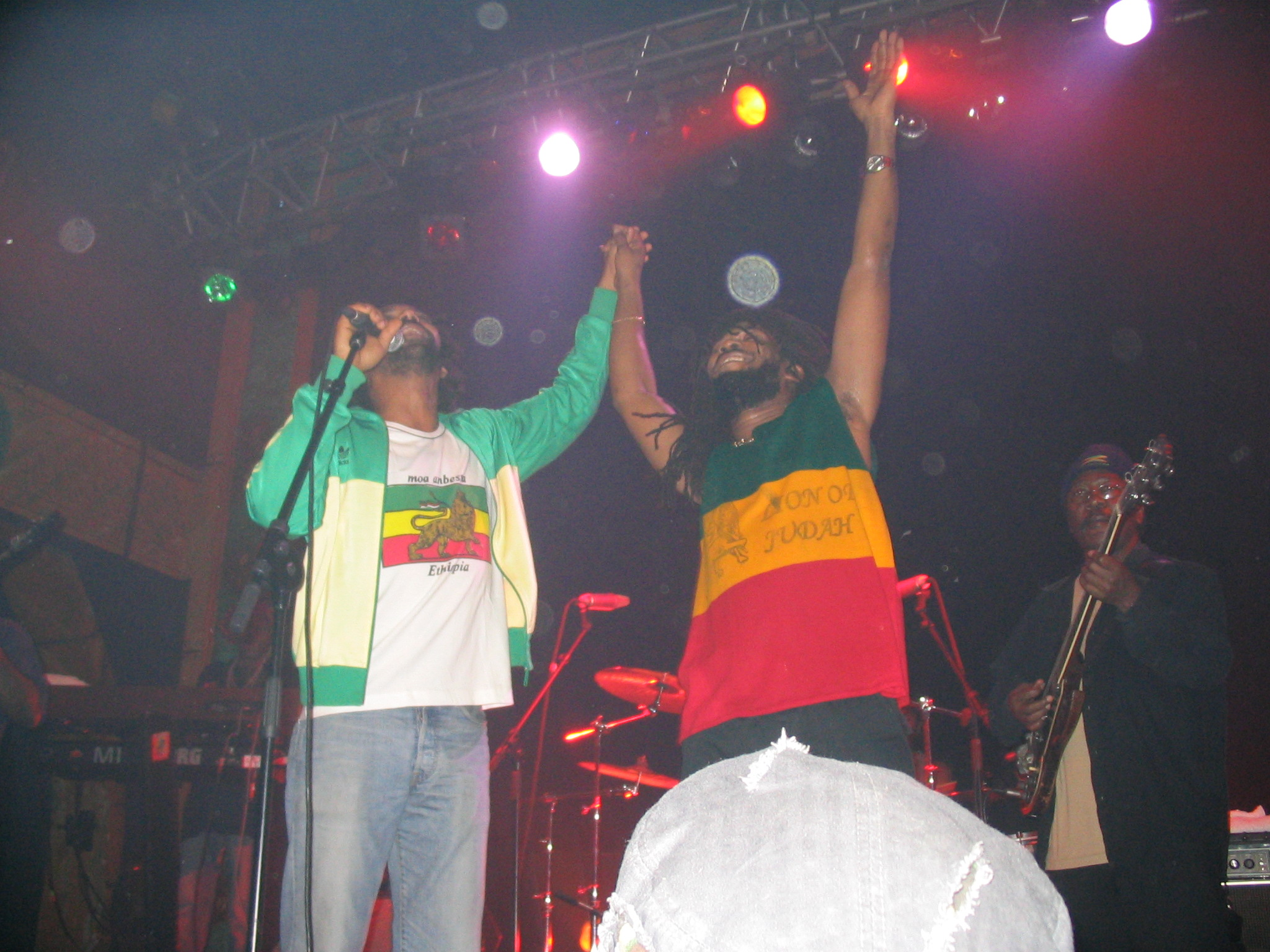
- The Gladiators in concert in Rockstore, Montpellier, France, in November 2006

Background information
- Origin: Kingston, Jamaica
- Genres: Roots reggae
- Years active: 1968–present
- Members: Gallimore Sutherland; Alan Griffiths; Anthony Griffiths; Clinton Rufus; Vernon Sutherland; Glen Williams; Mark Gooden
- Past members: Albert Griffiths; Clinton Fearon; Errol Grandison; David Webber

The Gladiators are a Jamaican roots reggae band, most popular during the 1970s. The core was Albert Griffiths (lead guitar and vocals; born 1945, died 15 December 2020), Clinton Fearon (bass guitar and vocals) and Gallimore Sutherland (rhythm guitar and vocals). Their two most famous albums are Trenchtown Mix Up (1976) and Proverbial Reggae (1978) with songs such as "Hearsay", "Jah Works", "Dreadlocks the Time is Now". "Mix Up", "Music Makers from Jamaica", and "Soul Rebel" – a song written by The Wailers. Gladiators also cooperated with the toaster U-Roy.

== History ==
Albert Griffiths, singer and guitar player, was the founder of the reggae group The Gladiators. After some success with the singles "You Are The Girl" (a b-side to The Ethiopians' hit record "Train to Skaville") in 1967, he recruited his childhood friends David Webber and Errol Grandison in 1968 to form the original Gladiators vocal group. The group's name was allegedly suggested by a fellow bus passenger during the time of their first recordings.

The group's first major success was with the single "Hello Carol" in 1969, for producer Coxsone Dodd, which topped the Jamaican music charts. Shortly afterwards, in 1969, Webber was stricken with illness and was replaced by Clinton Fearon, one of Griffiths' proteges. Similarly Grandison left the group in 1973 for family commitments and was replaced by Gallimore Sutherland.

During the early 1970s the Gladiators cut numerous records for various producers such as, Lloyd Daley and Lee Perry, but it was their recordings for Dodd at Studio One that became the biggest hits. During this time at Studio One the Gladiators' hits included "Bongo Red", "Jah Jah Go Before Us", "Mr. Baldwin", and "Roots Natty".

The success of these recordings garnered the attention of Britain-based Virgin Records, who gave the group their first major recording contract in 1976. Their debut album released on Virgin was the Tony Robinson produced Trenchtown Mix Up (1976), which included revisions of many of their early hits. They followed this effort with Proverbial Reggae (1978). At the time Gladiators was a band with Albert Griffiths on lead guitar and vocals, Clinton Fearon on bass guitar and vocals, Gallimore Sutherland on rhythm guitar and vocals, Sly Dunbar on drums, Lloyd Parks on bass, Uziah "Sticky" Thompson on percussion, Ansel Collins on keyboards and Earl 'Wire' Lindo on synthesizer. Errol Thompson and Joe Gibbs were their engineer and mixer, and Robinson the record producer.

Dodd and Studio One also released Studio One Presenting the Gladiators, (1978) a compilation of some early Gladiators' records released 1968 – 1974. The Gladiators' next two albums on Virgin were Naturality (1978) and Sweet So Till (1979). The group's next album Gladiators was recorded at Coach House Studios in the UK with local producer Eddy Grant. It was the first Gladiators' album on which no member of the group played any of the instruments, as a few members of the band Aswad were brought in. The album did worse than their previous work, and they were subsequently dropped from their contract with Virgin. Virgin subsequently released two compilation albums Vital Selection in 1981 and Dreadlocks The Time Is Now in 1983.

At the time, roots reggae was declining. A new type of reggae – based on drum machine, sampler, synthesizers and organ – occurred in the 1980s; ragga. One of the reasons for ragga's swift propagation is that it is generally easier, and less expensive to produce, than reggae performed on traditional musical instruments. Nevertheless, the Gladiators released eleven studio albums in the 1980s. They soon found a home at US-based Nighthawk Records and released Symbol of Reality in late 1982 followed by Serious Thing in 1984. One year later the Gladiators changed labels again, this time moving to Heartbeat Records, where they released albums throughout the latter half of the decade. In 1987 Fearon left the group after eighteen years, but Griffiths and Sutherland have continued to release albums on various labels since then.

With the advent of dancehall in the 1990s, the Gladiators only released three studio albums during that decade. Eventually, the Gladiators, Mighty Diamonds, Bunny Wailer, Heptones and Burning Spear had a renaissance. The dancehall artists had to change their profile and baptised their new showmanship as conscious dancehall.

In 2005, the Gladiators released Fathers and Sons which has been regarded as Albert Griffiths' farewell after ill health forced him to retire from touring, with his sons, Alan and Anthony, joining the group.

In June 2013, the group announced that their next album would be a collaboration with deejay Droop Lion, nephew of original Gladiators' member David Webber, performing new versions of some of the group's most popular tracks.

== Discography ==
=== Studio albums ===
Album	Release year	Label
Trenchtown Mix Up	1976	Virgin Records
Studio One Presenting the Gladiators	1977	Studio One
Proverbial Reggae	1978	Virgin Records
Naturality	1979	Virgin Records
Sweet So Till	1979	Virgin Records
Gladiators	1980	Virgin Records
Babylon Street	1982	Jam Rock Records
Back To Roots	1982	Stunt Sounds
Symbol of Reality	1982	Nighthawk Records
Reggae To Bone	1982	Jam Rock Records
Serious Thing	1984	Nighthawk Records
Show Down Vol. 3 w/ Don Carlos & Gold	1984	Empire Records
Reggae Jamboree	1984	Roots Reggae Library
Country Living	1985	Heartbeat Records
Dread Prophesy w/ The Ethiopians	1986	Nighthawk Records
In Store For You	1988	Heartbeat Records
On The Right Track	1989	Heartbeat Records
Valley of Decision	1991	Heartbeat Records
A True Rastaman	1992	MPO Records
The Storm	1994	Riddim Mu Records
Something a Gwaan	2000	RAS Records
Once Upon A Time in Jamaica	2002	XIII Bis Records
Fathers and Sons	2005	RAS Records
Continuation	2009	Mediacom
Back on Tracks	2014	Utopia

=== Index of 1966 - 1975 singles and recordings ===
Album	Songs	Label
Bongo Red	12	Roots Reggae Library
Freedom Train	12	Roots Reggae Library
Live Wire	11	Roots Reggae Library
Peace Truce	11	Roots Reggae Library
Watch Out	11	Roots Reggae Library

=== Compilation and live albums ===
Album	Release date	Label
Studio One Presenting the Gladiators	1979	Studio One
Vital Selection	1981	Virgin Records
Gladiators By Bus	1982	Jam Rock Records
Live at Reggae Sunsplash w/ Israel Vibration	1982	Genes Records
Dreadlocks The Time Is Now	1983	Virgin Records
A Whole Heap	1989	Heartbeat Records
Full Time	1995	Nighthawk Records
Alive & Fighting	1997	Mediacom Records
At Studio One: Bongo Red	1998	Heartbeat Records
Sold Out	2000	M10 Records
Live in San Francisco	2003	2B1 Records
Europe Tour 2006: Live in Paris	2006	Unknown
