= Bertram McLean =

Bertram Washington McLean
- Also known as: Ranchie
- Born: 15 August 1948
- Origin: Jamaica
- Died: 14 November 2012 (aged 64)
- Genres: Reggae
- Occupations: Musician, singer, songwriter, actor
- Instruments: Guitar, bass guitar, keyboards
- Years active: Early 1970s – 1998
- Formerly of: RHT Invincibles, The Impact All Stars, The Revolutionaries, Skin, Flesh and Bones, Jimmy Cliff, Augustus Pablo

Bertram McLean (c.1948 – 14 November 2012), also known by his nickname "Ranchie", was a Jamaican musician active between the 1970s and the 1990s, who recorded with many of Jamaica's biggest stars.

== Biography ==
McLean began working as a session musician in the 1970s, as guitarist in the groups the RHT Invincibles (along with Ansell Collins, Lloyd Parks, and Sly Dunbar), The Randy's house band The Impact All Stars, The Revolutionaries, and Skin, Flesh & Bones, and playing on albums by artists including Earth & Stone, Culture, and Jimmy Cliff. He also released solo material including the "Toy" single. Primarily a guitarist and bass guitarist, he also plays keyboards. Throughout the 1980s he was in demand as a studio musician, joining Cliff's backing band Oneness and writing songs for Cliff such as "Rub-A-Dub Partner" and "Roots Woman", recording with The Clarendonians and Sadao Watanabe, and playing on the soundtrack to films Club Paradise and Rockers, in which he also had small roles. In the 1990s his output increased, working with Burning Spear, I-Roy, The Meditations, and Sly & Robbie.

McLean's career as a musician came to an end after he suffered a stroke in 1998. In 2010 he underwent surgery after being diagnosed with prostate cancer. He died on 14 November 2012 at the University Hospital of the West Indies after a long illness.
