= Lynford Anderson =

Jamaican studio engineer, producer, and vocalist (1941–2020)

Linford Anderson
- Also known as: Andy Capp
- Born: July 8, 1941; Clarendon Parish, Jamaica
- Died: March 16, 2020 (aged 78) Austell, Georgia
- Genres: Reggae
- Occupations: Studio engineer, vocalist, record producer
- Years active: Late 1950s–1970s
- Labels: Upset

Linford Anderson aka Andy Capp (July 8, 1941 – March 16, 2020) was a Jamaican studio engineer, producer, and vocalist, best known for his 1968 hit "Pop a Top".

== Biography ==
Anderson was born in Clarendon Parish, Jamaica on July 8, 1941, and gained his early studio experience working for the RJR radio station, after initially being employed there as a log keeper, having studied accountancy. From there he moved on to Ronnie Nasrullah's recently created WIRL studio, where he gained experience with a two-track mixer, under the guidance of Australian engineer Graeme Goodall. His engineering skills were used extensively by producer Leslie Kong, and he eventually moved into production himself, using an Ampex two-track mixing board to create remixes of tracks and to combine several tracks into a single song. He also founded the Upset record label in 1967 along with Lee "Scratch" Perry and trainee engineer Barrington Lambert. His self-productions included "Pop a Top", which he described as the first ever Jamaican "talking" record (although a handful of deejay records had been released earlier), which at the time of its release in early 1968 was unusual in that its rhythm was noticeably faster than the prevailing rocksteady beat. "Pop a Top"'s rhythm track was based on Dave Bartholomew's "South Parkway Mambo", and its lyric was based on a Canada Dry commercial; The song was later used by Canada Dry in an advertising campaign in the 1970s. The line "taste the tits, taste the tits" caused controversy when it was played by John Peel on his BBC Radio 1 show, with the BBC receiving a number of complaints. He further contributed to the development of reggae later in 1968 when he worked with Perry on "People Funny Boy", which had a rhythm based on music that Anderson and Perry had heard at a Pocomania church service the night before.

Anderson has been described as one of the most gifted recording engineers ever to work in Jamaica, and was described by Winston Holness as "the greatest engineer at those times...a genius in the business". He worked for several years for Byron Lee at his Dynamic Sounds studio, working on recordings including the backing track to Roberta Flack's "Killing Me Softly with His Song", and on recordings by The Wailers. He stated in the 1990s that during that period he would record or master up to 100 songs a day. He also recorded for Lee himself, including the 1970 single "The Law". In 1970, Anderson mixed the first truly multitrack dubs at Dynamic Sounds. He also co-produced the Byron Lee & the Dragonaires album Reggay Blast Off the same year.

In 1977, Anderson emigrated to New York City, where he eventually landed a position as an audio engineer for the United Nations. He retired to Charlotte, North Carolina in 2004. After suffering a lengthy illness, Anderson died on March 16, 2020.

== Discography ==
- Pop a Top. Single, 1968
- Andy Capp & King State: Herbsman Shuffle, Single, 1969
- Law part 1 & 2. Single, Duke Records, 1970
