= Michael de Koningh =

British music journalist

Michael de Koningh (1958–2016) was a contemporary British music journalist specialising in Jamaican music, reggae afrobeat and afrofunk.

De Koningh wrote books, articles and reviews in UK musical magazines (Record Collector, Record Buyer, Let's Catch the Beat, Distant Drums "Echoes" "Blues & Soul") and also linernotes for reggae albums, sometimes under the name of Door Peeper. He also produced reggae compilations, and ran a mail order reggae vinyl business called Reggae Reggae Reggae.

Michael died in June 2016, aged 58, unexpectedly after a short illness.

== Bibliography ==
- Tighten up! : the history of reggae in the UK / with Marc Griffiths, 2003, Sanctuary Publishing, UK, ISBN 1-86074-559-8
- Young, gifted and black : the story of Trojan Records / with Laurence Cane-Honeysett, 2003, Sanctuary Publishing, UK, ISBN 1-86074-464-8
