= Ijahman Levi =

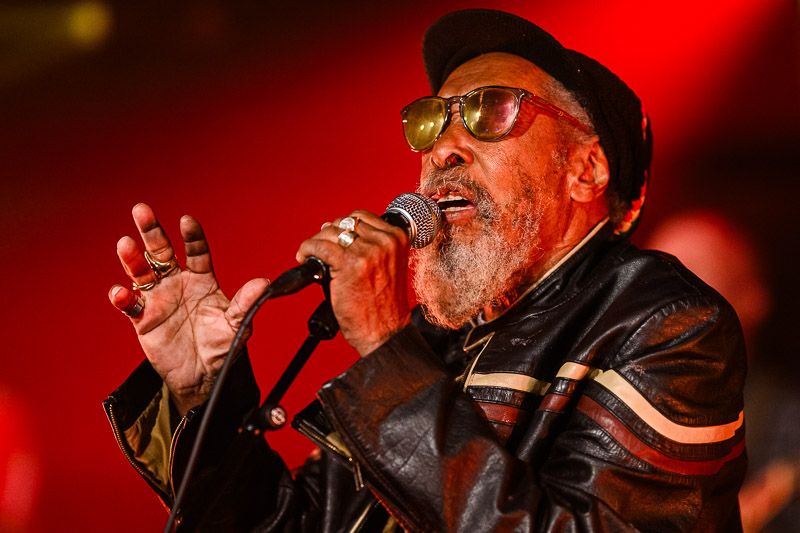
- Ijahman Levi live at Burgerweeshuis (Deventer), Netherlands, 29 May 2025. Photograph by Raymond Rothengatter

Background information
- Born: Trevor Augustus Sutherland; 26 June 1946 (age 80); Christiana, Manchester, Jamaica
- Genres: Conscious roots reggae, rastafari, dub, Nyabinghi rhythm
- Instruments: Vocals, guitar
- Label: Island Records

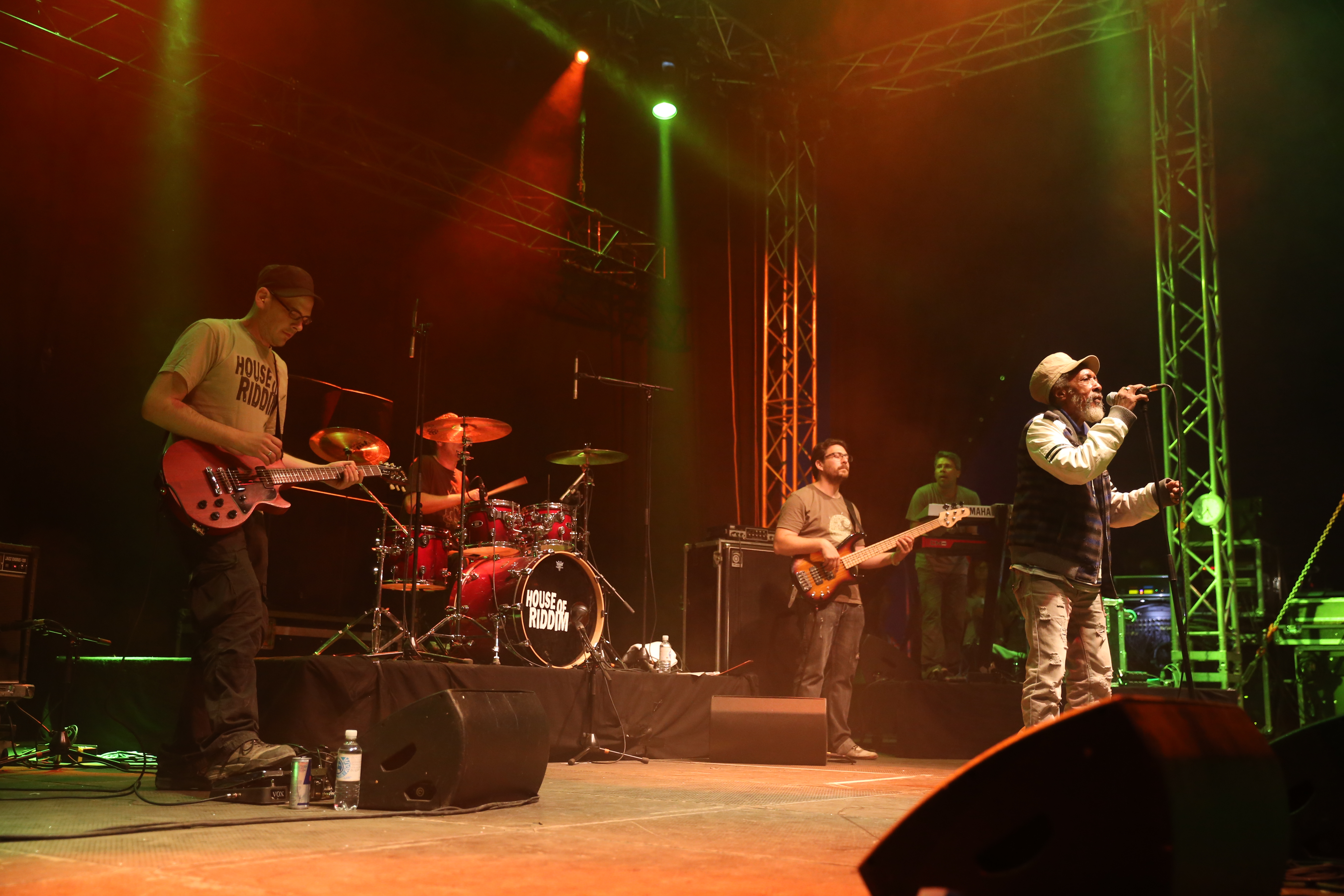
Ijahman Levi with House of Riddim (2013)

Ijahman Levi (born Trevor Augustus Sutherland; 26 June 1946) is a Jamaican-British conscious roots reggae chanter, artist and musician. In his early years, Levi was tutored by musician and vocal teacher, Joe Higgs. His first album, Haile I Hymn, was released on Island Records in 1978. He became Ijahman Levi after a religious spiritual conversion to Rastafari when he was in prison between 1972 and 1974. It and his following records preach Rastafari movement as well as Twelve Tribes of Israel doctrine.

== Biography ==
Levi moved with his parents to the United Kingdom in 1963. In 1966 and 1969, he released two singles under the name of The Youth. The first one was in 1966 for Polydor 56121 "As Long As There Is Love" b/w "Your One and Only Man", both covers of Jimmy Ruffin and Otis Redding songs. Levi has mentioned he is an Otis Redding fan. They were cut in a typical mod R&B soul style. His second single was for Deram, released 17 January 1969, and featured "Meadow of My Love" b/w "Love Me or Leave Me". The B-side was self-written, being credited to 'Sutherland'. He recorded "Fire Fire" b/w "Jesus Keepeth My Soul" as The Youth on Pama in 1971. His next three singles were "I'm a Levi" and "Jah Heavy Load" on Concrete Jungle followed by "Chariot of Love" on Organisation, all produced by Dennis Harris, in 1976, before signing to Island Records. In 1985 Levi released "I Do", a duet he recorded with his second wife, Madge. The song performed well on the British reggae chart, reaching the top position. Levi's most famous composition is "Jah Heavy Load", recorded and released in 1976.

== Discography ==
- 1978 – Haile I Hymn (Chapter 1)
- 1978 – Haile I Hymn (Chapter 2)
- 1979 – Are We a Warrior
- 1982 – Tell It to the Children
- 1984 – Lilly of My Valley
- 1985 – Africa
- 1986 – I Do (Ijahman and Madge)
- 1987 – Forward Rastaman
- 1987 – Culture Country
- 1988 – Ijahman and Friends
- 1988 – Over Europe Live
- 1989 – Inside Out
- 1991 – On Track
- 1991 – Love Smiles
- 1992 – Kingfari
- 1993 – Entitlement
- 1993 – Gemini Man
- 1994 – Two Double Six
- 1994 – Black Royalties
- 1995 – Home Free by Madge
- 1995 – Live in Paris 1994
- 1995 – Ijahman Sings Bob Marley
- 1996 – Ijahman & Bob Marley in Dub
- 1997 – Live at Reggae on the River
- 1997 – Beauty and the Lion
- 1997 – Lion Dub Beauty
- 1998 – Crocodile Man
- 1998 – Monkey Man
- 2000 – Arkart
- 2001 – The Roots of Love
- 2006 – Versatile Life
