= Papa Kojak =

Jamaican deejay and singer (1959–2024)

- Also known as: Kojak; Nigger Kojak
- Born: Floyd Anthony Perch; 30 September 1959; Kingston, Jamaica
- Died: 12 September 2024 (aged 64)
- Genres: Reggae
- Instrument: Vocals

Papa Kojak, also known as Kojak or Nigger Kojak (born Floyd Anthony Perch; 30 September 1959 – 12 September 2024), was a Jamaican reggae deejay and singer.

== Biography ==
Perch began his career under the name Pretty Boy Floyd, deejaying on various sound systems. Taking inspiration from Telly Savalas' television character, Kojak, Perch changed his stage name to Nigger Kojak, shaving his head and often appearing with Kojak's signature lollipop. He had a local hit with his debut single, "Massacre", and after featuring on Dennis Brown's "Ain't That Loving You" single with "Hole In De Bucket", along with a female singer, as Kojak and Liza, many of his subsequent releases would be combinations with "Liza", although there were at least two female singers who joined him under that name (Beverly Brown and Jacqueline Boland), including the debut Showcase album. Kojak was one of a number of deejays who shifted the emphasis from 'cultural' chants to pure 1980s dancehall chat. The success of Kojak and Liza led to the track "Nice Up Jamaica" (actually a Perch solo outing, on the "Real Rock" rhythm) being endorsed by the Jamaican tourist board.

Perch set up his own label, also called Nigger Kojak, releasing records by artists including Delton Screechie.

1983 saw a second album, with Rock Jack Kojak, recorded live at Prince Jammy's studio.

Perch resurfaced in 1996 as a singer, releasing an album of soul cover versions under his real name on the Mouthpiece record label.

Perch died on 12 September 2024, at the age of 64.

== Discography ==
=== Singles ===
- "Hole In The Bucket" (1979, Laser) (on the Dennis Brown "Ain't That Loving You" 12")
- "Christmas Style" (1978, Joe Gibbs)
- "Massacre" (1979, Belmont/Laser)
- "Fist To Fist Rub a Dub" (1979, Belmont) (Nigger Kojak & Liza)
- "I'm Still in Love with You" (1979, Joe Gibbs) (Marcia Aitken & Nigger Kojak)
- "Sky Juice" (1979, Joe Gibbs) (Nigger Kojak & Liza)
- "Different Style" (1979, Joe Gibbs)
- "Big Iron" (19??, Joe Gibbs)
- "Nice Up Jamaica" (?, Nigger Kojak)
- "Olive Baby" (1980, Moa Anbaessa) (Delton Screechie & Kojak)
- "Do It Sweet" (1980, Moa Anbessa)
- "Penitentiary" (1980, Nigger Kojak)
- "Yu Jamming So" (?, Joe Gibbs)
- "Green Bay Killing" (19??), Joe Gibbs
- "Pon the Corner" (19??, Joe Gibbs)
- "Pick It Up Liza" (?, Nigger Kojak) (A-side Delton Screechie - "I've Got A Letter")
- "Bam Bam" (1982, Joe Gibbs) (Kojak & Liza)
- "Early Rooster" (1982, Nigger Kojak) (Papa Kojak)
- "One Beer" (1982, ?)
- "Happy Day" (1982, Gorgon) (Nigger Kojak & Mother Liza)
- "Come Inna Dis" (1982, Rough & Tough)
- "Untrue Love version" (1982, Ruff N Tuff)
- "Chant Down Babylon" (1983, ?) (Nigger Kojak & Mother Liza)
- "Dedicated to You" (1983, ?) (Nigger Kojak & Mother Liza)
- "This Light of Mine Let It Shine" (1983, ?) (Nigger Kojak & Mother Liza)
- "Glory of Jah" (1983, ?) (Nigger Kojak & Mother Liza)
- "Dance Pon The Band Stand" (1983, ?) (Nigger Kojak & Mother Liza)
- "Open Up" (?, S&J Sound)
- "Send Down the Rain" (1983, S&J Sound)
- "Come A We"/"Hear Me Now" (?,?) (Tetrack & Nigger Kojak)
- "Them A Fight" (?,?) (Barry Brown, Nigger Kojak & Liza)
- "1000 Gal" (1980, Errol T)
- "Aki and Potato" (?,?) (Nigger Kojak & Liza)
- "My Woman"/"Ten Thousand Woman" (?,?) (Barrington Levy, Nigger Kojak & Liza)
- "Ram It" (?,?) (Nigger Kojak & Liza)
- "Jamin So"/"Greenbay Killing" (?,Crazy Joe) (Madoo & Nigger Kojak)
- "Black Skin" (?,?) (Nigger Kojak & Mother Liza)
- "Two Bad Duppy" (?,?) (Nigger Kojak & Mother Liza)
- "The Posse" (?,?) (Nigger Kojak & Liza)
- "Down By The Riverside" (?,?)
- "Pot Cover" (1986, Hit/GG) (Kojak & Liza)
- "No Better Nuh Deh" (1987, Black Solidarity)
- "Rastaman Song" (?, Hit/GG) (Ethiopians & Kojak)
- "Sit Down Pon It" (1986, Music Trac) (Kojak & Liza)
- "Pill For Peace Combination" (200?, Uhuru) (Kojak, Bubbles)
- "Send Down the Rain" (2002, Uhuru)
- "Give Ear" (2008, Version City)
- "Rise & Shine" (2008, Heartical) (A-Side Chronicle - "Serve Jah")
- "Domino Tournament" (????), Gorgon
- "Straight to Yaba Yu's Head" (????, Roots From the Yard)
- "Fight Against Corruption" (19??, World Enterprise) (Nigger Kojak & Liza)
- "Trick in the Book" (19??, World Enterprise)
- "I Shall Not Remove" (19??, Parish) (Nigger Kojak & Liza)

=== Albums ===
- Nigger Kojak and Liza Showcase (1980, Gorgon)
- Rock Jack Kojak (1983, Nigger Kojak)
- Chant Down Babylon (198?, Gorgon) (as Mother Liza with Kojak)
- Life Is a Journey (198?) Razor Sounds
- Floyd Perch A/K/A Papa Kojak (1996, Mouthpiece)
- Screechie and Kojak (2004, Silver Kamel)
- Kojack Now (200?) Uhuru
