= Graeme Goodall =

Australian recording engineer and record label owner

- Born: 1932; Caulfield, Victoria, Australia
- Died: 3 December 2014 (aged 82) Atlanta, Georgia, United States
- Genres: Ska, reggae
- Occupations: Recording engineer, record label manager
- Labels: Island, Doctor Bird, Pyramid, Attack

Graeme Goodall (1932 – 3 December 2014) was an Australian recording engineer and record label owner who was a key figure in the early days of Jamaica's recording industry, constructing several of the Island's studios, co-founding Island Records, and operating other labels in the United Kingdom releasing Jamaican music.

== Career ==
Born in 1932, Graeme Goodall grew up in Caulfield, Victoria, and studied at Caulfield North Central School and Scotch College. In the early 1950s he worked at Melbourne radio station 3UZ briefly before studying television in London and training as an engineer with the International Broadcasting Company.

He became involved in the independent record industry and travelled to Jamaica in 1954 to set up the first FM radio network in Kingston — Radio Jamaica Rediffusion. He went on to work as chief engineer of the Jamaica Broadcasting Corporation.

He began recording local musicians at the Radio Jamaica studios, and went on to build Federal Records, Jamaica's first recording studio (which was rebuilt in 1961 and later became Tuff Gong Recording Studio) with local entrepreneur Ken Khouri to the rear of Khouri's furniture store on King Street. Goodall worked as a recording engineer for Ken Khouri on some of the earliest Jamaican studio recordings. The studio not only provided the Island's first recording facility but also produced acetate discs, allowing sound system operators to record tracks and have them available to play within hours.

Known to the local musicians as "Mr. Goody", Goodall went on to assist with the construction of several studios, including Dynamic Sound, Studio One and later Channel One Studios, and carry out engineering work for producers such as Clement "Coxsone" Dodd, Byron Lee, and Leslie Kong, engineering recordings by Laurel Aitken ("Boogie in My Bones") Millie ("My Boy Lollipop"), The Wailers, Prince Buster, The Skatalites, Derrick Morgan, and Desmond Dekker, among many others. He also trained Jamaican engineers such as Sylvan Morris and Lynford Anderson.

In 1959 he co-founded Island Records with Chris Blackwell and Kong, but his relationship with Blackwell broke down and he went on to start his own labels after relocating to the UK in 1965, the most successful of which were Doctor Bird and Pyramid. After Dekker's "Poor Me, Israelites" proved popular in clubs but failed to get much airplay due to its production, Goodall got Kong to send him the master tapes; he remixed it and released it in the UK in 1969 on Pyramid as "Israelites", the single going on to top the UK Singles Chart and sell over two million copies. He also ran West Indies Records and set up the Trojan Records subsidiary Attack Records.

Goodall married his Jamaican wife Fay in 1961 and in the early 1970s they moved to the US. Goodall later worked as Southern Regional Manager for Sony Pro Audio.

Graeme Goodall died at his home in Atlanta, Georgia on 3 December 2014 from natural causes, aged 82. He was survived by his wife, two children, and four grandchildren.
