= Joe Gibbs (producer) =

- Born: Joel Arthur Gibson; 14 October 1942; Salt Spring, St. James, Jamaica
- Origin: Jamaica
- Died: 22 February 2008 (aged 65)
- Genres: Reggae, Dub
- Occupation: Producer
- Labels: Amalgamated, Pressure Beat, Joe Gibbs

Joe Gibbs, born Joel Arthur Gibson (14 October 1942 – 22 February 2008), was a Jamaican reggae and dub producer.

== Biography ==
Born in Salt Spring, St. James, in 1942, Joe Gibbs studied electronics in Cuba and went on to work as an electronic technician for Stone & Webster in Montego Bay. He moved to Kingston, where he set up an electrical repair shop in Beeston Street, with television repairs and sales as its main concern. It was in this shop that he first started to sell records. The fast growth of the local music scene encouraged him to get more involved in the music business, and in 1966 he started to record some artists in the back of his shop with a two-track tape machine, working with Lee Perry, who had just ended his association with Clement "Coxsone" Dodd. With the help of Bunny Lee, he launched his Amalgamated record label, and had his first success with one of the earliest rocksteady songs, Roy Shirley's "Hold Them", which topped the charts in Jamaica.

When Perry decided to leave to start his own record label, Upsetter, Gibbs enrolled the young Winston "Niney" Holness (later known as Niney the Observer), who helped Gibbs maintain his productions at the top of the charts. During the rocksteady period until 1970, he had hit records with numerous artists including the Pioneers, Errol Dunkley, and Ken Parker. He also worked with backing bands such as Lynn Taitt and the Jets (including the organist Ansel Collins, and horns players Tommy McCook, Johnny "Dizzy" Moore, Bobby Ellis and Vin Gordon), or the Hippy Boys (featuring the Barrett brothers as the rhythm section).

He concentrated exclusively on the production of the then new reggae sound after his first international success "Love of the Common People" by Nicky Thomas (No. 9 in the UK Singles Chart in summer 1970). Gibbs still recorded the rocksteady artists that he had initially worked with; artists like the Ethiopians, Delroy Wilson, and the Heptones. The two volumes of his singles compilations The Heptones and Friends were best-sellers in Jamaica. During this period, he launched three new labels —Jogib, Shock, and Pressure Beat.

In 1972, after having moved his studio in the Duhaney Park district, he set up a new one at Retirement Crescent in Kingston's Cross Roads district and started to work with sound engineer Errol Thompson, who used to be at Randy's Studio. Together they were known as "The Mighty Two", and along with his studio band the Professionals (including bassist Robbie Shakespeare, drummer Sly Dunbar and guitarist Earl "Chinna" Smith), they produced hundreds of singles, including the hits "Money in My Pocket" by Dennis Brown, "Ah So We Stay" by Big Youth and "Eviction" by Black Uhuru. The duo worked on over 100 Jamaican number one hits.

In 1975, he set up his new 16-track studio and record pressing plant at Retirement Crescent and kept producing Jamaican artists under numerous label names (Crazy Joe, Reflections, Belmont, Town & Country). He had success again with roots reggae, rockers, lovers rock and dub music artists including: Dennis Brown, Jacob Miller, Sylford Walker, the Mighty Diamonds, Gregory Isaacs, Prince Alla and Junior Byles.

The 1977 Culture album Two Sevens Clash was a major influence on the then emerging punk scene and an internationally acclaimed production. The album was cited by punk rock band the Clash. Other successful artists produced by the Mighty Two during the end of the 1970s include Marcia Aitken, Althea & Donna, John Holt, Barrington Levy, Cornell Campbell, Dean Fraser, Delroy Wilson, Beres Hammond, Ranking Joe, Prince Jazzbo, Prince Mohammed, Dillinger, Trinity, Prince Far I, Clint Eastwood, I-Roy and Kojak and Liza.

Apart from his extensive musical career, he also appeared as himself in the 1972 film The Harder They Come and the 1978 film Rockers.

In the 1980s, Gibbs had an international hit with J.C. Lodge's interpretation of "Someone Loves You Honey". However, Joe Gibbs's career suffered a severe blow following the release of this song. The success of Lodge's version triggered a massive lawsuit for unpaid royalties and errors in songwriting credits, leading to the closure of his studio. This catastrophic event disrupted his productions, stalling his career. Although Gibbs attempted to revitalize his career in the 1990s, the consequences of this incident seriously affected his trajectory in the industry.

Again in the 1990s–2000s he teamed up with Errol Thompson, and Sydney "Luddy" Crooks of the Pioneers, to produce some new music way into the new millennium. Before his death, Gibbs also went into business with Chris Chin of VP Records, which was one of his last business ventures.

He died of a heart attack on 22 February 2008, and was survived by his twelve children.

== Discography ==
=== Albums ===
- Joe Gibbs – Dub Serial – 1972
- Joe Gibbs – African Dub All-Mighty – 1973
- Joe Gibbs – African Dub Chapter 2 – 1974
- Joe Gibbs – State of Emergency – 1976
- Joe Gibbs – African Dub All-Mighty Chapter 3 – 1978
- Joe Gibbs – African Dub Chapter 3 & 4 – 1978–1979
- Joe Gibbs & Professionals – African Dub Chapter 4 – 1979
- Joe Gibbs – Majestic Dub – 1979
- Joe Gibbs Family – Wish You A Merry Rockers Christmas – 1979
- Joe Gibbs – Rockers Carnival – 1980
- Joe Gibbs – Reggae Christmas – 1982
- Joe Gibbs – African Dub Chapter 5 – 1984

=== Singles ===
- "Ten Feet Tall", 1970 reggae single by Joe Gibbs All Stars Pressure Beat 5508 A

=== Compilations ===
- Various Artists – Reggae Masterpiece Vol 01 – 1978 – Joe Gibbs
- Various Artists – Irie Reggae Hits – 1979 – Joe Gibbs
- Various Artists – Top Ranking DJ Session – 1979 – Joe Gibbs
- Various Artists – Shining Stars – 1983 – Joe Gibbs
- Various Artists – Best of Vintage – Joe Gibbs
- Various Artists – Explosive Rock Steady – 1967–1973 – Heartbeat Records (1991)
- Various Artists – The Mighty Two – Heartbeat Records (1992)
- Joe Gibbs & Friends – The Reggae Train 1968–1971 – Trojan Records (1988)
- Various Artists – Love of the Common People 1967–1979 – Trojan Records (2000)
- Various Artists – Uptown Top Ranking – 1970–1978 – Trojan Records (1998)
- Joe Gibbs & the Professionals feat. Errol Thompson – No Bones for the Dogs 1974–1979 – Pressure Sounds (2002)
- Various Artists – Joe Gibbs Productions – Soul Jazz Records (2003)
- Various Artists – Joe Gibbs Original DJ Classics – Rocky One
- Various Artists – Joe Gibbs Original DJ Classics Vol 02 – Rocky One
- Various Artists – Joe Gibbs Original DJ Classics Vol 03 – Rocky One
- Various Artists – Joe Gibbs Revive 45's Vol 01 – Rocky One
- Various Artists – Joe Gibbs Revive 45's Vol 02 – Rocky One
- Various Artists – Spotlight on Reggae Vol 01 – Rocky One
- Various Artists – Spotlight on Reggae Vol 02 – Rocky One
- Various Artists – Spotlight on Reggae Vol 03 – Rocky One
- Various Artists – Spotlight on Reggae Vol 04 – Rocky One
- Various Artists – Spotlight on Reggae Vol 06 – Rocky One
- Various Artists – Spotlight on Reggae Vol 07 – Rocky One
- Joe Gibbs – Scorchers From The Mighty Two – VP Records (2008)
- Various Artists – Scorchers From The Early Years 1967-73 – 17 North Parade (VP Records) (2009)

== Bibliography ==
- Larkin, Colin, ed. (1998). The Virgin Encyclopedia of Reggae. Virgin Books. ISBN 978-0-7535-0242-6.
