= Doctor Bird Records =

British and Jamaican record label

Doctor Bird (founded 1965) was a British and Jamaican record label named after the Jamaican doctor bird. It was founded by Graeme Goodall after his break from Island Records. By 1971 it had a subsidiary Jazz Workshop Records.
