= Nighthawk Records =

American record label

- Nighthawk Records
- Founded: 1976
- Founder: Robert Schoenfeld
- Defunct: 2017
- Status: acquired by Omnivore Recordings
- Country of origin: United States
- Official website: www.nghthwk.com

Nighthawk Records was an American independent record label, founded by Robert Schoenfeld who began operations in 1976 with the release of four vintage post-war blues reissue albums. This series consists of nine volumes of post-war blues recordings from Chicago, Detroit, Memphis and the Delta, New Orleans and the Southwest.

In 1979, Nighthawk expanded by launching the 200 series of blues productions with Mule, an album by Henry Townsend. Townsend made his first recordings for Columbia Records in 1929. Since then he recorded and performed on a variety of labels including RCA/Bluebird, as well as Paramount, Bullet and Prestige/Bluesville. In the 1980s, Nighthawk became a predominantly conscious roots reggae label before going out of business in the late 1990s.

The 300 series began in 1980 with Wiser Dread, an anthology of Rastafarian roots music recorded between 1972 and 1978. Steven Davis, author of Reggae Bloodlines, has called Wiser Dread the "...best reggae anthology since The Harder They Come ten years ago." Since then Nighthawk released a self-produced album by The Morwells of some of their singles and three volumes of Nighthawk's own Jamaican productions: Brutal Out Deh by the Itals, Symbol of Reality by the Gladiators and Calling Rastafari featuring Culture, the Itals, the Gladiators, Wailing Souls and Mighty Diamonds.

In October 2017, Omnivore Recordings acquired the back catalogue of Nighthawk Records.

== See also ==
- List of record labels
