= Lloyd Parks =

Jamaican reggae vocalist and bass player (born 1949)

- Born: 26 May 1949 (age 77)
- Origin: Kingston, Jamaica
- Genres: Rocksteady, reggae, roots reggae, dub
- Occupation: Musician
- Instrument: Bass guitar
- Years active: Mid-1960s–present

Lloyd Parks (born 26 May 1949) is a Jamaican reggae vocalist and bass player who has recorded and performed as a solo artist as well as part of Culture, Skin, Flesh & Bones, The Revolutionaries, The Professionals, and We the People Band.

== Biography ==
Born in Kingston, Jamaica, Parks' interest in music was fuelled by his uncle Dourie Bryan, who played in a calypso band, and Parks became the band's singer. In the late 1960s, he performed with the Invincibles band (whose members also included Ansell Collins, Sly Dunbar and Ranchie McLean) before teaming up with Wentworth Vernal in The Termites. In 1967, they recorded their first single, "Have Mercy Mr. Percy", and then an album Do the Rocksteady for Coxsone Dodd's Studio One label. After recording "Rub Up Push Up" for the Dampa label, Parks and Vernal split up. Parks then briefly joined The Techniques as a replacement for Pat Kelly, recording tracks such as "Say You Love Me", before embarking on a solo career and later starting his own label, Parks. His second single was the classic "Slaving", a moving song about the struggles of a working man. As a solo artist, Parks recorded a number of songs for Prince Tony Robinson, owner of Groovemaster record label, including "Trenchtown Girl" and "You Don't Care". Some of his best-known solo hits include "Officially", "Mafia" (both 1974), "Girl in the Morning" and "Baby Hang Up The Phone" (both 1975).

Parks was a studio bass player, backing many reggae artists, including Justin Hinds on Duke Reid's Treasure Isle label. He was a member of Skin, Flesh, and Bones along with Ansell Collins on keyboards, Tarzan on keyboards, and Ranchie McLean on guitar. This group backed Al Brown on his hit "Here I am Baby", and many other artists. When Skin Flesh and Bones started playing for Channel One Studios, Parks renamed the band The Revolutionaries. Parks was also a member of Joe Gibbs' house band, The Professionals, performing hits such as Althea & Donna's "Up Town Top Ranking", and in the 1970s he backed artists including Dennis Brown, The Abyssinians, The Itals, The Gladiators, Culture, Bim Sherman and Prince Far I.

In 1974, he founded the We the People Band, who backed Dennis Brown on tour for over 20 years and have been regulars at the Reggae Sunsplash and Reggae Sumfest festivals. The band also included singer Ruddy Thomas and a horn section of Tony Greene (saxophone), Everol Wray (trumpet), and Everald Gayle (trombone), and with the band continuing for over forty years, the line-up has included Parks' daughter Tamika on keyboards and his son Craig "Leftside" Parks on drums.

Parks' band also backed John Holt along with the Royal Philharmonic Orchestra in London in 2000.

In 2015 Parks recorded an album of songs originally recorded by the Techniques; Lloyd Parks Sings The Techniques is set for release in early 2016.

== Solo discography ==
- Officially (1974, Attack)
- Girl in the Morning (1975, Trojan))
- Loving You (1976, Trojan))
- Meet the People (1978, Parks)
- Jeans, Jeans (1985, Tad's)
- What More Can I Do (1983)

=== Compilations ===
- Still Officially Yours, The Collection 1970–2004 (2005, Parks Records)
- Time A Go Dread (2016, Pressure Sounds)
