= Clinton Fearon =

Jamaican reggae singer and musician

- Born: Clinton Anthony Fearon; 13 January 1951 (age 75)
- Origin: Saint Andrew Parish, Jamaica
- Genre: Reggae
- Occupations: Singer, songwriter, musician, producer
- Instruments: Bass, guitar, percussion

Clinton Anthony Fearon (born January 13, 1951) is a Jamaican reggae singer and musician. He has lived in Seattle, Washington since 1987.

== Career ==
=== Jamaica ===
Clinton Fearon was born near Kingston, and quickly moved to St. Catherine, a rural Jamaican province. Fearon was heavily influenced by the music found at his local Seventh-day Adventist church. He returned to Kingston at age 16, where he founded his first band, The Brothers. Errol Grandison, who first encountered Fearon through his work with The Brothers, quickly offered him a chance to replace David Webber as the third member of The Gladiators. He joined the group in 1969, first as a singer and then as a bass player and background vocalist after the departure of both Grandison and David Webber. He remained with the group until 1987, often appearing as the leader on songs including "Chatty Chatty Mouth", "Rich Man Poor Man", "Get Ready" and "Let Jah Be Praised". During these years, he also worked as a session-man for a range of artists, including Coxsone, Lee Perry, Joe Higgs, Yabby You, Joseph Hookim and Prince Tony Robinson.

=== United States ===
By the late 1980s, Fearon began to feel artistically crowded after nearly two decades of playing with the same band. As such, Fearon left the band and settled in Seattle, Washington, following the Gladiators' 1987 American tour, in order to launch his solo career. His first project in the United States, The Defenders, enjoyed moderate success with the EP "Rock Your Bones," released in 1989. The group was short-lived and disbanded in 1992.

In 1994, Fearon reorganized his musical vision by forming The Boogie Brown Band. The group's debut album, "Disturb the Devil," marks the beginning of Fearon's successful solo career and features Barbara Kennedy on keyboards, Lamar Lofton on bass, Girt Bolo on drums, and John Saba on guitar. He followed this release with a series of other albums produced by his newborn record label, Boogie Brown Productions.

Notable releases under Boogie Brown Productions also include Mi An' Mi Guitar, a 2005 acoustic album that refashions classic Gladiators recordings such as "Richman Poorman" and "Streets Of Freedom." Clinton Fearon followed Mi An' Mi Guitar with his 2006 album Vision, which is composed of long, melodic songs that masterfully complement his earlier solo releases. In 2008, Clinton Fearon released Faculty Of Dub, featuring all original music as well as his own bass playing for the first time in nearly two decades.

Clinton Fearon splits his time between Seattle and France and continues to tour with The Boogie Brown Band. His 2012 album Heart And Soul reached number 20 on the World Music Charts Europe in August 2012. In 2016, he released the album This Morning.

In July 2024, he released the single "Come With Us" with the Naya Rockers (featuring drummer Nathan Sabanayagam, bassist Nate Edgar, guitarist Andy Bassford, and keyboardist Cameron Greenlee) for the 2025 benefit album Higher Education supporting the Alpha School of Music.

== Discography ==
=== Solo albums ===
- 1994 – Disturb the Devil
- 1997 – Mystic Whisper
- 1999 – What a System + Dub Wise – dub version to What a System – (double CD)
- 2002 – Soon Come - Best
- 2004 – Give & Take
- 2005 – Mi An' Mi Guitar – acoustic album
- 2006 – Vision
- 2008 – Faculty Of Dub
- 2010 – Mi Deh Yah
- 2012 – Heart and Soul – acoustic album
- 2014 – Goodness
- 2016 – This Morning
- 2019 – History Say
- 2022 – breaking news
- 2024 – Survival Vibration
- 2025 – Jah is love

=== With The Gladiators ===
- 197X – "One The Other Side" (drawn from the album Presenting)
- 197X – "Tribulation" (drawn from the album Presenting)
- 197X – "Jah Almighty" (drawn from the album Presenting)
- 197X – "Has Prayer To Thee" (drawn from the album Presenting)
- 197X – "Untrue Girl" aka "Ungrateful Girl" (drawn from the album Bongo Red, title produced by Lee "Scratch" Perry)
- 197X – "Small channel & Shine" (duet with Watty "King" Burnett, produced by Lee "Scratch" Perry)
- 197X – "Message To The Nation" (drawn from the 45 rpm "Message To The Nation", produced by Lee " Scratch" Perry)
- 197X – "Stand Firm" (Dat Ma Val)
- 197X – "Togetherness" (Sky High)
- 1976 – "Chatty Chatty Mouth" (drawn from the album Trenchtown Mix Up)
- 1976 – "Thief In The Night" (drawn from the album Trenchtown Mix Up)
- 1977 – "Can You Imagines How I Feel" (drawn from the album Proverbial Reggae)
- 1977 – "Marvel Not" (drawn from the album Proverbial Reggae)
- 1977 – "Stop Before You Go" (drawn from the album Proverbial Reggae)
- 1978 – "Get Ready" (drawn from the album Naturality)
- 1978 – "Give Thanks & Praise" (drawn from the 45 rpm produced by Yabby You and credited with the Prophets)
- 1979 – "Black Saturday" (drawn from 12" from Gregory Isaacs & U Roy The Tide Is High)
- 1979 – "Let Jah Be Praised" (drawn from the album Sweet So Till)
- 1979 – "Backyard Meditation" (drawn from the album Sweet So Till)
- 1979 – "Merrily" (drawn album Sweet So Till)
- 1980 – "Oh What has Joy" (drawn from the album GladiAtors)
- 1980 – "Disco Reggae" (drawn from the album GladiAtors)
- 1982 – "Rich Man, Poor Man" (drawn from the album Back To Roots)
- 1982 – "Streets Of Freedom" (drawn from the album Back To Roots)
- 1982 – "Follow The Rainbow" (drawn from the album Back To Roots)
- 1982 – "One Love" (drawn from the album Reggae To Bone)
- 1982 – "I'm Not Crying" (drawn from compilation Full Time)
- 2004 – "Dreadlocks The Time is Now" (19 track Compilation from Virgin Records)

=== DVDs ===
- Live At Reggae Bash (Lyon 2004)
