= Niney the Observer =

- Born: George Boswell; December 7, 1944 (age 81); Jamaica
- Origin: Montego Bay, Jamaica
- Genres: Reggae
- Occupations: Producer

Winston Holness, better known as Niney the Observer OD (born George Boswell, 1944 in Montego Bay, Jamaica), is a Jamaican record producer and conscious roots reggae singer who is a key figure in the creation of many classic reggae recordings, discomixes and sound system dubplates dating from the 1970s and early 1980s.

== Biography ==
Holness gained his nickname "Niney" after losing a thumb in a workshop accident. In the latter half of the 1960s he worked as an engineer at KG records, where he began producing. His first release was his own composition "Come on Baby" issued on his Destroyer label. He moved on to work with Bunny Lee in 1967, then for Lynford Anderson's studio, then working for Joe Gibbs as chief sound engineer, replacing his friend Lee "Scratch" Perry. While working for Gibbs he produced Dennis Alcapone and Lizzy's "Mr. Brown", and played a major role in launching the career of Dennis Brown.

After leaving Gibbs' setup, his first major success as a producer was "Blood & Fire" in December 1970, initially released in a pressing of 200 on his Destroyer label, but reissued the following year on his Observer label, and going on to sell over 30,000 copies in Jamaica. Inspired by Perry's nickname of "The Upsetter", Holness adopted "The Observer", using the name for his new Observer label, and the name of his house band, The Observers (actually the Soul Syndicate). Several singles followed, some reusing the "Blood & Fire" rhythm, including Big Youth's "Fire Bunn".

In the early 1970s, Holness became one of Jamaica's most sought after producers, with Dennis Brown, Delroy Wilson, The Heptones, Johnny Clarke, Slim Smith, Jacob Miller, Junior Delgado, and Freddie McGregor all using his services. He also continued to record himself, on collaborations with Dennis Alcapone, Max Romeo, and Lee Perry. By the mid-1970s, he was also working with Ken Boothe, Junior Byles, Gregory Isaacs, Horace Andy, I-Roy, and Dillinger. The late 1970s saw him still active as a producer, but his output in the early 1980s was significantly less after relocating to France. He re-emerged in 1982 with the Ital Dub Observer Style album and returned to Kingston in 1983, taking on the role of house producer for the Hitbound label at Channel One Studios. In this capacity he was one of the first to work with Beenie Man, and also produced Third World and Sugar Minott.

In the mid-1980s, he relocated to New York City, returning to Kingston again in 1988, and working with Yami Bolo, Frankie Paul, Andrew Tosh, and Junior Byles. He began an association with Heartbeat Records, working on reissues of much of his back catalogue, as well as new recordings. He continued to produce new material through the 1990s.

In the mid-1990s, noted collector Steve Barrow and Simply Red vocalist Mick Hucknall started a reggae and dub reissue programme, naming the company Blood and Fire (record label) in honour of Niney's hit record, and, in 2001, they reissued Observer rarities on an album entitled Niney the Observer – Microphone Attack 1974–1977, collecting rare Discomixes of the work of Ranking Trevor, Big Youth, I-Roy and Leroy Smart, thus introducing Niney's productions to a new generation of listeners. In March 2013, Niney The Observer opened his own Observer Soundbox Studio on Lyndhurst Road, Kingston.

Holness, who has a child with autism, recorded the single "Children" in 2015 with Jimmy Cliff, Sly and Robbie, and Errol "Flabba" Holt, to raise funds for Cliff's foundation and a school for autistic children.

In August 2015, it was announced that he would be awarded the Order of Distinction by the Jamaican government.

== Discography ==
=== Albums ===
- Bring the Dub Come (1975)
- Observer All Stars and King Tubby's – Dubbing with the Observer (1975)
- Nuclear Jammin' (1986)
- King Tubby's Special 1973–1976 (with King Tubby, Observer All Stars & The Aggrovators) (1989)
- Space Flight Dub (1989)
- Freaks (1992)
- Observer Attack Dub (1994)
- Niney & Friends: Blood & Fire (1997)
- Niney Featuring Soul Syndicate – Present Dub (1999)
- @ Channel One (2001)
- Station Underground Report (with Lee "Scratch" Perry) (2001)
- At King Tubby's – Dubplate Specials 1973–1975 (2002)
- Dennis Brown in Dub (2002)
- Head Shot: Reggae Instrumentals, Dubs and Other Oddities (2002)
- Sledgehammer Dub in the Streets of Jamaica (2003)
- Niney Presents The Uniques (2007)
- Channel One Presents: 100 Tons Of Dub (2009)
- Observer All Stars and King Tubby's – Dubbing with the Observer (Re-release) (2013)

=== Singles and EPs ===
- Lloyd Willis / Niney & The Destroyers – Mad Rooster / As Far As I Can See (7") (1970)
- Niney & The Destroyers – No Money, No Honey / This Message To You (7") (1970)
- Blood And Fire (1971)
- Maxie & Niney – Coming of Jah (1971)
- Blood And Fire (7") (1971)
- International Pum (7") (1972)
- In The Gutter (1972)
- Everyday Music (7") (1972)
- Niney & Ken Elliott – Honey Baby (7") (1972)
- Niney & The Observers – Hiding By The Riverside (7") (1972)
- Niney And Max – Aily And Ailaloo (7") (1972)
- Hi Diddle (7") (1972)
- Niney / Niney All Stars – Get Out Of My Life / Get Out (Version) (7") (1972)
- Wet Panty / Discharge No 2 (7") (1973)
- I Soon Know (1975)
- Niney & The Observers – Bring The Kutchie Come (1975)
- Youth / Observer Strike – 6 Dead Nineteen Gone To Jail / Head Line (7") (1977)
- Tyrone Taylor / Observer – Sufferation / Shot From The Pistol (7", Single) (1978)
- Niney & The Morwells – Mix Up (7") (1978)
- Cornell Campbell, Observer – Stars / Lotion (7") (1997)
- Cornell Campbell & The Uniques (Jamaican group) / Observer – My Country / Lotion (7") (1997)
- Freddy McGregor / The Observer – Warn The Nation / New World Order Rhythm (7") (2001)
- Cocoa Tea / The Observer – Dance Inna Parliament Square / New World Order Rhythm (7") (2001)
- At King Tubby's – Dub Plate Special 1973–1975 (10") (2002)
- Christine / Niney, Observer All Stars – Saturday Night (7") (2005)
- Delroy Wilson / Observer All Stars – Halfway Up The Stairs / Dub Stairs (2005)
- Dillinger / Niney The Observer – Flat Foot Hustling / Lotion Here I Come Again (7", Single, Re-Release) (2005)
- I-Roy / Niney & The Observer All Stars – Sister Maggie Breast / Wolf & Lotion (7", Single, Re-Release) (2005)
- Follow This Ya Sound (7") (2005)
- Austarr / Observer – We're Over / The Bullett (7", Single) (2005)
- Thief (7", Single, Re-Release) (2005)
- Mutiny (7", Single, Re-Release)
- Razor Blad Dub (7") (2005)
- Japanese Dub Basket / Observer Punchin' Dub (7") (2005)
- U-Roy / Niney & Observer All Stars – Train From West (7", Single, Re-Release) (2005)
- Quiet (7", Single, Re-Release) (2010)
- Maxie, Niney & Scratch / Jah T. – Babylose Burning / Lion of Judah
- Niney & Maxie / Niney, Observer – Pum Pum / Reggaematic (7", Single)
- Niney The Observer, Niney & Maxie – Reggaematic / Pum Pum (7")
- Power to the King (7")
- Another Pum / Big Hole (7")
- Beardmen Feast (7")
- Pass The Pipe (7")
- Gray Beard / Preasure Locks (7", Single)
- You Better Know / Moaner's (10")
- Maxie – Niney – Scratch / Max Romeo – Babylon Burning / Public Enemy Number One (7", Single, Re-Release)
- Joseph Cotton & The Observer – Fit & Ready / Iron Fist (12", Maxi)
- The Observers / Observer – Bearded Man Feast / Episode
- Field Marshall Buckas / Observer Style – Amrbic / Hammering (7", Single)
- "Child Abuse" (2015) - with Jimmy Cliff

=== Compilations ===
- Ital... Observer Style (1983)
- Observation Station (1990)
- Niney The Observer Presents The Observer All Stars – Turbo Charge (1991)
- Truth And Rights, Observer Style (1994)
- Microphone Attack 1974–78 (2001)
- Niney & Friends: Blood & Fire (2005)
- Roots With Quality (2009)
- Born in Jamaica (2009)
- Sing It Wicked Style (2012)

=== Miscellaneous ===
- Grievous Angel Vs. Niney The Observer – Blood And Fire (Twist-Up Jungle Mix)

== See also ==
- List of Jamaican record producers
