= Heartbeat Records =

American record label

- Parent company: Rounder Records
- Founded: 1981
- Founder: Duncan Browne, Bill Nowlin
- Distributor: Universal Music Group
- Genre: Ska, rocksteady, reggae, dancehall, dub
- Country of origin: U.S.
- Location: Burlington, Massachusetts

Heartbeat Records is an independent record label based in Burlington, Massachusetts. The label specializes in Jamaican music.

Founded by reggae music enthusiasts Bill Nowlin and Duncan Brown, the label's first release was a vinyl LP reissue of Linton Kwesi Johnson's Dread Beat an' Blood (1981). In 1983, Chris Wilson was hired as VP of A&R and the label began their association with Studio One label founder Clement Dodd and released Best of Studio One, a compilation of Dodd-produced music by artists including Dennis Brown, Alton Ellis, The Gladiators, Marcia Griffiths, The Heptones, Slim Smith, Sugar Minott, and Johnny Osbourne, among others. Heartbeat has released over 60 Studio One albums. The label licensed music from a number of different Jamaican producers including Lee "Scratch" Perry, Joe Gibbs, Sonia Pottinger, Clancy Eccles, Alvin Ranglin, Duke Reid, Niney the Observer, Sly & Robbie, Steely & Clevie, and Lloyd Daley. The label financed and booked the Heartbeat Culture Splash Tour, consisting of Michael Rose, Sister Carol, the Meditations, Derrick Morgan, and the S.A.N.E. band, that toured the United States in 1996. In 2000, Heartbeat Records received a Grammy Award for Burning Spear's Heartbeat album entitled Calling Rastafari (1999) which has since been deleted from the catalog. Heartbeat Records won Boston magazine's Best of Boston 2000 award for Best Record Label. In January 2007, Heartbeat moved to Burlington, Massachusetts. The same year, Heartbeat started the web site and podcast entitled the Heartbeat Reggae Podcast.

== Albums (present) ==
- Big Youth – Some Great Big Youth (1981)
- Big Youth – The Chanting Dread inna Fine Style (1982)
- Culture – Lion Rock (1982)
- Lee "Scratch" Perry – Mystic Miracle Star (1982)
- Various Artists – Dee-Jay Explosion in a Dance Hall Style (1982)
- Various Artists - Black Star Liner: Reggae from Africa (1983)
- Various Artists - Churchical Chants of the Nyabingi (1983)
- Black Uhuru - Guess Who's Coming To Dinner (1983)
- Various Artists - Word Sound 'Ave Power (1983)
- Various Artists - Gregory Isaacs and Friends: Top Ten (1984)
- Various Artists - Lee "Scratch" Perry and the Upsetters: Some of the Best (1986)
- Various Artists - Sly & Robbie: Taxi Fare (1986)
- Various Artists - Heartbeat Reggae (1988)
- Meditations - For the Good of Man (1988)
- Augustus Pablo - Rebel Rock Reggae (1986)
- Big Youth - Manifestation (1988)
- Gladiators - A Whole Heap (1989)
- Tamlins - Love Divine (1989)
- Gladiators - On the Right Track (1989)
- Gregory Isaacs - My Number One (1989)
- Various Artists - Hitbound! The Revolutionary Sound of Channel One (1989)
- Various Artists - Clancy Eccles Presents His Reggae Revue: Rock Steady Intensified (1990)
- Gregory Isaacs - Dancing Floor (1990)
- Various Artists - Holy Ground: Alvin Ranglin's GG Records (1990)
- Various Artists - Derrick Harriott Riding the Musical Chariot (1990)
- Little John - Boombastic (1990)
- Gregory Isaacs - Love Is Overdue (1991)
- Culture - Culture in Culture (1991)
- Sugar Minott - Happy Together (1991)
- Yami Bolo - He Who Knows It Feels It (1991)
- Frankie Paul - Should I (1991)
- Lee "Scratch" Perry - Lord God Muzick (1991)
- Chris Wayne - Talk About Love (1991)
- Various Artists - Niney the Observer Presents the All-Stars: Turbo Charge (1991)
- Various Artists - Musical Feast: Mrs. Pottinger's High Note and Gayfeet Label (1991)
- Various Artists - Lloyd Daley's Matador Productions (1992)
- Various Artists - Duke Reid's Treasure Chest (1992)
- Lee "Scratch" Perry - Soundzs from the Hotline (1992)
- Ethiopians - Slave Call (1992)
- Niney the Observer - Freaks (1992)
- Gregory Isaacs - Best of Vol. 1 & 2 (1992)
- Various Artists - Steely & Clevie Play Studio One Vintage (1992)
- Roots Radics - World Peace III (1992)
- Melodians - Swing and Dine (1992)
- Yami Bolo - Up Life Street (1992)
- Michigan & Smiley - Rub-a-Dub Style (1992)
- Sugar Minott - Showcase (1992)
- Johnny Osbourne - Truths and Rights (1992)
- Various Artists - Reggae Christmas from Studio One (1992)
- Dennis Brown - Some Like It Hot (1992)
- Various Artists - Explosive Rock Steady: Joe Gibbs' Amalgamated Label (1992)
- Larry Marshall - I Admire You (1992)
- Various Artists - Hard Works from the Observer All Stars (1992)
- Meditations - Return of the Meditations (1992)
- Various Artists - The Mighty 2: Joe Gibbs and Errol Thompson (1992)
- Various Artists - Dancehall Roughneck (1993)
- Baby Wayne - Ram DJ (1993)
- Various Artists - Heartbeat Reggae Now (1993)
- Culture - Trod On (1993)
- Various Artists - Kingston Town (1993)
- Dennis Brown - Cosmic Force (1993)
- Alton Ellis - Cry Tough (1993)
- Techniques - Run Come Celebrate (1993)
- Queen Majeeda - Conscious (1993)
- Frankie Paul - Don Man (1993)
- Jah Messengers - Reggae Time (1993)
- Starlights - Soldering (1993)
- Fleshy Ranks - Bustin' Out (1994)
- Dennis Brown - Light My Fire (1994)
- Gregory Isaacs - My Poor Heart (1994)
- Various Artists - More Hottest Hits from Treasure Isle (1994)
- Culture - Culture in Dub (1994)
- Everton Blender - Lift Up Your Head (1994)
- Meditations - Deeper Roots: Best of the Meditations (1994)
- Freddie McGregor - Zion Chant (1994)
- Mandators - Power of the People (1994)
- Tony Rebel & Garnet Silk - Tony Rebel Meets Garnet Silk in a Dancehall Conference (1994)
- Jack Radics - Open Rebuke (1994)
- Various Artists - Ram Jam a Gwan (1994)
- Ethiopians - Owner fe de Yard (1994)
- Various Artists - Respect to Studio One (1994)
- Alton Ellis - Sunday Coming (1995)
- Jackie Mittoo - Tribute To Jackie Mittoo (1995)
- Michael Rose - Michael Rose (1995)
- Various Artists - Streets of Ska (1995)
- Various Artists - Go Ska Go (1995)
- Various Artists - Dub Specialist: 17 Dub Shots from Studio One (1995)
- Various Artists - The Marley Family Album (1995)
- Dennis Brown - Open the Gate (1995)
- Various Artists - Treasure Isle Mood (1995)
- Various Artists - Treasure Isle Time (1995)
- Derrick Morgan - Ska Man Classics (1995)
- Various Artists - Reggae's Greatest Hits Vol. 1 (1995)
- Various Artists - Reggae's Greatest Hits Vol. 2 (1995)
- Various Artists - Reggae's Greatest Hits Vol. 3 (1995)
- Various Artists - Reggae's Greatest Hits Vol. 4 (1995)
- Various Artists - Reggae's Greatest Hits Vol. 5 (1995)
- Various Artists - Reggae's Greatest Hits Vol. 6 (1995)
- Various Artists - Reggae's Greatest Hits Vol. 8 (1995)
- Various Artists - Reggae's Greatest Hits Vol. 9 (1995)
- Various Artists - Reggae's Greatest Hits Vol. 10 (1995)
- Upsetters - Upsetters a Go Go (1995)
- Nardo Ranks - Cool and Humble (1995)
- Gregory Isaacs - Dreaming (1995)
- Sister Carol - Black Cinderella (1995)
- Beres Hammond & Derrick Lara - Expression (1995)
- Various Artists - Dub Over Dub: 27 Track Dub Extravaganza (1996)
- Various Artists - The Reggae Train (1996)
- Various Artists - Reggae Songbirds (1996)
- Various Artists - Run Rhythm Run (1996)
- Everton Blender - Piece of the Blender: The Singles (1996)
- Michael Rose - Be Yourself (1996)
- Michael Rose - Big Sound Frontline (1996)
- Peter Tosh - The Toughest (1996)
- Various Artists - Urban Beat Reggae (1996)
- Heptones - Sea of Love (1997)
- Maytals - Never Grow Old (1997)
- Michael Rose - Dance Wicked (1997)
- Skatalites - Foundation Ska (1997)
- Junior Byles - Curly Locks (1997)
- Beres Hammond - Getting Stronger (1997)
- Derrick Morgan - Time Marches On (1997)
- Gregory Isaacs - Hold Tight (1997)
- Lee "Scratch" Perry - Upsetter Shop Vol. 1 (1997)
- Michael Rose - Dub Wicked (1997)
- Culture - Production Something (1998)
- Abyssinians - Declaration of Dub (1998)
- Horace Andy - Mr. Bassie (1998)
- Gladiators - The Gladiators at Studio One: Bongo Red (1998)
- Michael Rose - Party in Session - Live (1998)
- Various Artists - Ska After Ska After Ska (1998)
- Alpheus - Quality Time (1999)
- Ken Boothe - A Man and His Hits (1999)
- Marcia Griffiths - Truly (1999)
- Bob Marley & the Wailers - Destiny: Rare Ska Sides from Studio One (1999)
- Bob Marley & the Wailers - Wailers & Friends: Top Hits Sung by the Legends of Jamaica Ska (1999)
- Tommy McCook - Greatest Hits of the Skatalites (1999)
- Various Artists - Upsetter Shop Vol. 2 (1999)
- Michael Rose - Bonanza (1999)
- Various Artists - Studio One Dancehall Selection (1999)
- Various Artists - Studio One Showcase Vol. 1 (1999)
- Gregory Isaacs - Best of Vol. 1 (1999)
- Roots Radics - Forward Ever, Backwards Never (1999)
- Leonard Dillon - On the Road Again (1999)
- Everton Blender - Rootsman Credential (1999)
- Dennis Brown - Tribulation (1999)
- Albert Griffiths & the Gladiators - Valley of Decision (1999)
- Gregory Isaacs - Best of Vol. 2 (1999)
- Dennis Brown - Cosmic Force (2000)
- Gregory Isaacs - Dancing Floor (2000)
- Meditations - For the Good of Man (2000)
- Everton Blender - Live at the White River Reggae Bash (2000)
- Various Artists - Heartbeat Reggae 2000 (2000)
- Various Artists - Rare Reggae Grooves from Studio One (2000)
- Various Artists - Dance Hall Liberation (2000)
- Various Artists - Black Foundation in Dub (2000)
- Roland Alphonso - Something Special: Ska Hot Shots (2000)
- Bob Marley & the Wailers - Climb the Ladder (2000)
- Various Artists - Feel Like Jumping: The Best of Studio One Women (2000)
- Various Artists - Nice Up the Dance: Studio One Discomixes (2001)
- Michael Rose - Never Give It Up (2001)
- Spanner Banner - Real Love (2001)
- Everton Blender - Visionary (2001)
- Various Artists - Knock Out Ska (2001)
- Various Artists - By Special Request (2001)
- Dennis Brown - Dennis Brown in Dub (2002)
- Various Artists - Ska All Mighty: Top Ska Classics from the Treasure Isle Label (2002)
- Mutabaruka - Life Squared (2002)
- Various Artists - Baffling Smoke Signal (2002)
- Various Artists - Treasure Isle Showtime (2002)
- Gregory Isaacs - I Found Love (2002)
- Various Artists - Christmas Greetings from Studio One (2002)
- Maytones - Their Greatest Hits (2003)
- Bob Marley & the Wailers - Greatest Hits at Studio One (2003)
- Various Artists - Cutting Razor: Rare Cuts From The Black Ark (2003)
- Gregory Isaacs - Gregory Isaacs in Dub: Dub a de Number One (2003)
- Culture - World Peace (2003)
- Everton Blender - King Man (2003)
- Various Artists - Fat Eyes Dancehall Deelite (2003)
- Various Artists - Fat Eyes Deelite / Fat Eyes Dancehall Attack (2003)
- Lucky Dube - The Other Side (2004)
- Heptones - Deep In The Roots (2004)
- Michael Rose - Happiness: The Best of Michael Rose (2004)
- Burning Spear - Creation Rebel (2004)
- Nazarenes - Songs of Life (2005)
- Various Artists - The Best of Studio One (2006)
- Various Artists - Full Up: More Hits from Studio One (2006)
- Various Artists - Downbeat the Ruler: Killer Instrumentals from Studio One (2006)
- Bob Marley & the Wailers - One Love at Studio One (2006)
- Freddie McGregor - Bobby Bobylon (2006)
- Various Artists - Ska Bonanza: The Studio One Ska Years (2006)
- Delroy Wilson - The Best Of: Original Eighteen: Deluxe Edition (2006)
- John Holt - I Can't Get You Off My Mind: 18 Greatest Hits (2006)
- Various Artists - Studio One Presents Version Dread (2006)
- Various Artists - The Best of Studio One Collection (2006)
- Alton Ellis - I'm Still In Love With You; Featuring Hortense Ellis (2006)
- Various Artists - Six the Hard Way (2006)
- Gladiators - Studio One Singles (2007)
- Abyssinians - Satta Massagana Deluxe Edition (2007)
- Bob Marley & the Wailers - Another Dance: Rarities from Studio One (2007)
- Various Artists - When Rhythm Was King (2007)
- Dennis Alcapone - Forever Version Deluxe Edition (2007)
- Lone Ranger - Forever Version Deluxe Edition (2007)
- Heptones - Sweet Talking (2007)
- GG's All Stars - Roots Man Dub (2007)
- Lee "Scratch" Perry - Chicken Scratch (2008)
- Johnny Osbourne - Truths and Rights Deluxe Edition (2008)

== DVDs (present) ==
- Morgan Heritage - Live in Europe (2004)
- Various Artists - Heartbeat Video Culture Splash (2005)

== Box sets (present) ==
- Various Artists - The Best of Studio One Collection (2006)

== Box sets (out of print) ==
- Bob Marley & the Wailers - The Studio One Singles Box

== Albums (out of print) ==
- Big Youth - Some Great Big Youth (1982)
- Mikey Dread - Beyond World War III (1982)
- Burning Spear - Farover (1982)
- Mikey Dread - S.W.A.L.K. (1982)
- Sugar Minott - Good Thing Going (1982)
- Papa Finnigan & Junior Ranking - Two the Hard Way (1983)
- Various - Best of Studio One (1983)
- Sugar Minott - Sufferer's Choice (1983)
- Burning Spear - The Fittest of the Fittest (1983)
- Various - Dub Poets Dub (1984)
- Scientist & Peter Chemist - 1999 Dub (1984)
- Sugar Minott - Slice of the Cake (1984)
- Mikey Dread - Pave the Way (1984)
- Burning Spear - Resistance (1985)
- Various Artists - Full Up: Best of Studio One Vol. 2 (1985)
- Albert Griffiths & Gladiators - Country Living (1985)
- Various Artists - Roy Cousins Presents Wambesi All Stars (1986)
- Ansel Collins - Reggae (1986)
- Sugar Minott - In a Reggae Dance Hall (1986)
- Bob Andy - Retrospective (1987)
- Sugar Minott - African Soldier (1988)
- Ansel Collins - So Long (1988)
- Chris Wayne - Reggae (1988)
- Lee "Scratch" Perry - Chicken Scratch (1989)
- Various Artists - Collector's Edition: Rare Reggae from the Vaults of Studio One (1989)
- Sugar Minott - Ghetto Child (1989)
- Alton Ellis & Hortense Ellis - Alton & Hortense Ellis (1990)
- Gregory Isaacs - Dancing Floor (1990)
- Roots Radics - Forward Ever, Backwards Ever (1990)
- Various Artists - Niney the Observer: Observation Station (1990)
- Various Artists - Original Club Ska (1990)
- Various Artists - Fire Down Below: Scorchers from Studio One (1990)
- Winston Jarrett & the Righteous Flames - Solid Foundation (1991)
- Various Artists - Soul Defenders at Studio One (1991)
- Various Artists - Heartbeat Reggae Roundup (1991)
- Leonard Dillon the Ethiopian - On the Road Again (1991)
- Albert Griffiths & the Gladiators - Valley of Decision (1991)
- Bob Marley & the Wailers - One Love (1991)
- Termites - Do the Rock Steady (1991)
- Slim Smith - Born to Love (1991)
- Cables - What Kind of World (1991)
- Dennis Alcapone - Forever Version (1991)
- Lone Ranger - On the Other Side of Dub (1991)
- Delroy Wilson - Original Twelve: The Best of Delroy Wilson (1991)
- Larry Marshall - Presenting Larry Marshall (1992)
- Lee "Scratch" Perry - The Upsetter and the Beat (1992)
- Various Artists - Solid Gold, Coxsone Style (1992)
- Willie Williams - Armagideon Time (1992)
- Abyssinians - Satta Massagana (1993)
- Burning Spear - The World Should Know (1993)
- Burning Spear - Living Dub Volume One (1993)
- Burning Spear - Living Dub Volume Two (1993)
- Various Artists - Truth and Rights Observer Style (1994)
- Andrew Tosh - Original Man (1994)
- Burning Spear - Hail H.I.M. (1994)
- Burning Spear - Love & Peace: Burning Spear Live! (1994)
- Sister Carol - Call Mi Sister Carol (1994)
- Various Artists - Mojo Rock Steady (1994)
- Various Artists - Reggae Culture: Heartbeat Reggae Now! (1994)
- The Viceroys - The Viceroys at Studio One: Ya Ho (1995)
- Burning Spear - Rasta Business (1995)
- Various Artists - Grooving at Studio One (1996)
- Sister Carol - Lyrically Potent (1996)
- Burning Spear - Appointment With His Majesty (1997)
- Burning Spear - Living Dub Volume 3 (1997)
- Burning Spear - Calling Rastafari (1999)
- Burning Spear - Living Dub Vol. 4 (1999)
- Various Artists - Jack Ruby Presents the Black Foundation (2000)
- Richie Spice - Universal (2000)
- Various Artists - Head Shot: Reggae Instrumentals, Dubs and Other Oddities (2002)
- Various Artists - Rock On: Greatest Hits from the Observer Label (2002)
- Various Artists - Urban Beat Reggae: Dancehall Massive Culture (2003)
- Niney the Observer Presents King Tubby in Dub - Bring the Dub Come (2003)

== Singles (out of print) ==
- Oku Onuora - "Wi a Come" (1983)
- Oku Onuora & AK7 - "Pressure Drop" (1984)
- Sister Carol - "Blackman Time" (1995)
- Everton Blender - "Lift Up Your Head" (1995)
- Sister Carol - "Dread Natty Congo/Herbal Affair" (1996)
- Michael Rose - "Rude Boys (Back in Town)/I Love King Selassie" (1996)
- Everton Blender - "Slick Me Slick" (1999)

== Promotional DVDs (out of print) ==
- Studio One: The Birthplace of Reggae Music DVD Electronic Press Kit (2006)

== Promotional CDs (out of print) ==
- Sister Carol - I Am What I Am (1994)
- Burning Spear - Burning Spear Talks About Rasta Business (1995)
- Burning Spear - Not Stupid/The Sun (1996)
- Various Artists - Heartbeat Culture Splash 96 (1996)
- Everton Blender - A Piece of the Blender: The Singles (1996)
- Burning Spear - Come in Peace (1997)
- Various Artists - The Sound of Summer (1997)
- Michael Rose - Dance Wicked/Lion in the Jungle featuring Maxi Priest (1997)
- Michael Rose - Reggae Superstar (1998)
- Burning Spear - House of Reggae/Interview (2000)
- Bob Marley & the Wailers - White Christmas (2002)
- Various Artists - 2006 Studio One Sampler (2006)

== Promotional vinyl (out of print) ==
- Burning Spear - Mi Gi Dem (Give Them)/Dub Them (1993)
- Bob Marley & the Wailers - Destiny/Rude Boy (1999)
- Spanner Banner - Man a Earth Man w/Richie Spice/Sweet Pain w/Lady Saw (1999)
- Burning Spear - As It Is (2000)
- Everton Blender - Lovers Holiday/Watch It (2001)

== See also ==
- List of record labels
