= Roots reggae =

Subgenre of reggae music

- Stylistic origins: Riddim; reggae; ska; rocksteady; Nyabinghi
- Cultural origins: Jamaica
- Derivative forms: Dub

Other topics
- Rastafari; Haile Selassie

Roots reggae is a subgenre of reggae that deals with the everyday lives and aspirations of Africans and those in the African Diaspora, including the spiritual side of Rastafari, black liberation, revolution and the honouring of God, called Jah by Rastafarians. It is identified with the life of the ghetto sufferer, and the rural poor. Lyrical themes include spirituality and religion, struggles by artists, poverty, black pride, social issues, resistance to fascism, capitalism, corrupt government and racial oppression. A spiritual repatriation to Africa is a common theme in roots reggae.

== History ==
The increasing influence of the Rastafari movement after the visit of Haile Selassie to Jamaica in 1966 played a major part in the development of roots reggae, with spiritual themes becoming more common in reggae lyrics in the late 1960s. Although romantic songs continued to predominate, from around 1971 an increasing number of reggae recordings addressed social, political, and spiritual themes. According to music historian Lloyd Bradley, this shift was accompanied by slower, deeper rhythms, greater use of Rastafarian-inspired percussion and horn arrangements, and more contemplative lyrics. Jimmy Cliff later recalled that roots reggae emerged amid growing dissatisfaction with post-independence Jamaica and worsening conditions in the country's ghettos.

During the early 1970s, roots-oriented music remained closely associated with Sound system (Jamaican) and dancehalls. Despite the success of recordings by the Wailers, the style was initially pursued by relatively few record producers. Phil Pratt, Herman Chin Loy, Keith Hudson and Coxsone Dodd were among those beginning to experiment with roots music during this period.

The growth of roots reggae did not displace romantic or pop-oriented material. During the 1970s, singers including Horace Andy, Dennis Brown, Gregory Isaacs and the Heptones recorded songs in both styles, while producers such as Lee "Scratch" Perry, Niney the Observer, Bunny Lee and Coxsone Dodd continued to produce more conventional pop material alongside roots recordings. Some songs combined the two approaches, including Junior Byles' "Curley Locks", produced by Perry, which addressed prejudice against dreadlocks through a romantic narrative.

Important early roots reggae releases included Winston Holness's "Blood & Fire" (1970) and Yabby You's "Conquering Lion" (1972). Political unrest also played its part, with the 1972 election campaign of Michael Manley targeting the support of Jamaica's ghetto communities. Increasing violence associated with the opposing political parties was also a common lyrical theme, with tracks such as Junior Murvin's "Police & Thieves" and Culture's "Two Sevens Clash".

During the mid-1970s, producer Bunny Lee and his session band, the Aggrovators, helped popularise the "flying cymbals" sound, characterised by a brisk, clipped hi-hat pattern. Drummer Carlton "Santa" Davis helped establish the style through his performance on Johnny Clarke's 1974 recording "None Shall Escape the Judgement". The sound became a dominant style of roots reggae for several years after 1974.

The heyday of roots reggae is usually considered the latter half of the 1970s – with artists such as the Abyssinians, Johnny Clarke, Cornell Campbell, Bob Marley, Peter Tosh, Burning Spear, Dennis Brown, Max Romeo, Horace Andy, Hugh Mundell, and Lincoln Thompson, and groups like Black Uhuru, Steel Pulse, Israel Vibration, the Gladiators and Culture – teaming up with producers such as Lee 'Scratch' Perry, Bunny Lee, Joseph Hoo Kim and Coxsone Dodd. The Sound system (Jamaican) was of unequalled importance in spreading reggae and dub, with the diaspora represented by leading sound system operators such as Jah Shaka, who, in turn, went on to profoundly influence many in Britain and the world, influencing early punk rock musicians in London, as well as definitively shaping later bass-dominated genres such as jungle music and drum and bass. The experimental pioneering of such producers within often-restricted technological parameters gave birth to dub, and is seen by some music historians as one of the earliest (albeit analogue) contributions to modern dance music production techniques.

Meanwhile, in Britain, roots reggae gained popularity among young Black audiences during the early 1970s, particularly in inner-city communities. According to music historian Lloyd Bradley, British reggae increasingly catered to Black audiences born or raised in the United Kingdom rather than primarily to Caribbean immigrants. Bradley associated the growing interest in roots reggae with young Black Britons' connections to African cultural identity. Established sound systems and specialist record shops also enabled reggae to reach its audience independently of mainstream radio and record retailers.

Beyond Britain's Black communities, roots reggae attracted a wider European audience during the 1970s, particularly among left-wing white youths in Western Europe. The Wailers' popularity in Europe opened the door for other artists, and roots reggae artists became popular with punk rock fans. When Jamaicans turned to dancehall, a lot of black, white and mixed roots reggae bands were formed in Europe. Later on roots reggae made its way into the United States with the migration of Jamaicans to New York. This took place with the reforms made to American immigration laws in the early 1960s. Along with localised traditions and food, reggae music was inevitably brought as well, contributing to the New York City soundscape, such as the development of hip-hop.

While roots reggae was largely overtaken in popularity in Jamaica by dancehall, several artists from the original era, such as Culture, Burning Spear, and Israel Vibration continued to produce roots reggae, and artists like Beres Hammond and Freddie McGregor continued the use of roots reggae, as a musical style and thematically, through the 1980s. In the 1990s younger Jamaican artists became interested in the Rastafari movement and began incorporating roots themes into their music. Most notable among the new generation of "conscious" artists was Garnett Silk, whose positive spiritual message and consistent use of roots and rocksteady riddims gave him cross generational appeal with Caribbean audiences. While other notable dancehall stars like Capleton and Buju Banton became devout Rastas and changed their musical direction as a result. Other modern roots artists and bands also emerged at this time, including Luciano, Junior Kelly, Morgan Heritage, Anthony B, and Sizzla.

== Africa as myth ==
Similar to the oversimplification and limitations of the terminology middle passage, the roots reggae displays Africa as a mythical paradise that functions primarily as a motivating symbol, imagined origin, and semantic center. "More so even than earlier sounds, roots reggae always seemed to invite itself directly to Africa, brazenly insisting upon itself as the continent's primary echo, if not recursive mirror". The mythical Africa articulated in roots reggae is shaped by desire, nostalgia and trauma under the pressure of local Caribbean politics. While an imagined Africa is used as an inspiration for resistance and revolution against "Babylon" (corrupted capitalist colonial culture), Africa's actual complexity and contradictions are not investigated.

== Roots reggae vs. traditional reggae ==
Traditional reggae and roots reggae, a subgenre that evolved from traditional reggae, while sharing a common Jamaican heritage, exhibit distinct characteristics that set them apart. Traditional reggae encompasses diverse themes, including love, everyday life, and dancehall culture, whereas roots reggae tends to focus its lyrics on social consciousness. Traditional reggae rhythms vary widely, featuring both upbeat and slower tunes. In contrast, roots reggae is marked by a deliberate one-drop rhythm and a slower tempo. Rooted in a deep social and political consciousness, its lyrics often tackle issues of poverty, oppression, and spirituality, influenced by the Rastafarian movement. Musically, roots reggae maintains a specific sonic identity, characterised by deep basslines, skanking guitar patterns, and the inclusion of horns. While these distinctions exist, the lines between reggae and roots reggae can be flexible, and the two genres share a significant overlap within the broader reggae musical landscape.

== See also ==
- List of roots reggae artists
