= Dub Kweli =

Remix album by Max Tannone
- Released: August 29th, 2010
- Genre: Hip hop, Reggae, Dub
- Label: Self-released
- Producer: Max Tannone

Dub Kweli is a mashup album of Talib Kweli and various classic reggae samples that was mixed and produced by New York producer Max Tannone. The album was officially released to download on August 29, 2010.

== Style ==
Editing tracks from popular dub music, like Scotty, Lee "Scratch" Perry, Prince Jammy, and Scientist and laying a cappella tracks from Talib Kweli, Tannone mixed the tracks using the same concept as he did with Mos Dub. He released the album almost immediately after finishing mixing it.

On August 10, 2010, via his Twitter, Tannone confirmed a sequel to the album Mos Dub would be released, but did not specify any details regarding it. Nine days later, he announced that he would release the album on September 1, or sooner if the Jaydiohead Facebook page fan count had reached 10,000. Dub Kweli was released as a free download on August 29, 2010, off of the official Dub Kweli website.

== Reception ==
Dub Kweli has generally received positive reviews. It has been well received by fans of his previous remixes, as well as by fans who do not typically like reggae music. In the same vein as Mos Dub, Dub Kweli has been described as being an album well fit for summertime listening by New York Magazine, as "Kweli's rhymes work well with the laid-back reggae backbeats." Hip-hop site Okayplayer described the album as "real clean." Adam Horovitz, also known as Ad-Rock of the Beastie Boys, voiced his support of the album in his personal blog.

Talib Kweli himself acknowledged Dub Kweli by retweeting about it twice on Twitter.

== Tracks ==
No.	Title	Music	Vocal sample	Length
1.	"Your Gospel"	"Draw Your Brakes" (from The Harder They Come by Scotty, 1972) & "Stop That Train" (from Stop That Train by Keith & Tex)	"Hostile Gospel Pt. 1" (from Ear Drum, 2007)	3:53
2.	"Country of Loving"	"Ghost of Frankenstein" (from Scientist Rids the World of the Evil Curse of the Vampires by Scientist, 1981) & "Sweet Loving" (from Gunman + Righteous Are the Conqueror by Michael Prophet, 1980)	"Country Cousins" (from Ear Drum by Talib Kweli feat. U.G.K. & Raheem Devaughn, 2007)	4:00
3.	"Ms. Good Lady"	"Black Princess Lady" (from Dub The Old Fashioned Way by Lee "Scratch" Perry & Prince Jammy)	"Ms. Fat Booty Pt. 2" (from Ms. Fat Booty (Pt. 2) Import Single by Mos Def feat. Ghostface,) & "Life Is Good" (from Life is Good 12" by DJ Deckstream feat. Mos Def & Talib Kweli)	4:21
4.	"Panta Move"	"Black Panta" (from Upsetters 14 Dub Blackboard Jungle by Lee "Scratch" Perry,)	"Move Somethin'" (from Train of Thought by Reflection Eternal, 2000)	3:17
5.	"Garvey Gets By"	"Marcus Garvey" (from The Island Anthology by Burning Spear, 1996) & "Marcus Garvey Dub" (from Marcus Garvey by King Tubby & Errol Thompson)	"Get By" (from Quality, 2002)	3:50
6.	"More Or Less Dub"	"This Day Dub" (from The Man From Wareika by Rico Rodriguez)	"More Or Less" (from "Ear Drum" by Talib Kweli feat. Dion)	3:41
7.	"Words High"	"Words" (from Words in Dub by Jah Marcus)	"Get Em High" (from The College Dropout by Kanye West feat. Talib Kweli & Common, 2004)	4:22
8.	"Mourning Unknown"	"Unknown track: Side B - Track 2" (from Aquarius Dub Vol. 4 by Herman Chin Loy,)	"Good Mourning" (from Train of Thought by Reflection Eternal, 2000)	3:26
9.	"Listen Fe"	"Butter Fe Fish" (from Buffer Fe Fish 7" by Skin, Flesh, and Bones)	"Listen" (from Ear Drum, 2007)	2:45
10.	"Away Dub"	"Dub Happening" (from Big Dub - Glen Brown Meets King Tubby - 15 Dubs From Lost Tapes by Glen Brown & King Tubby, 1996)	"Yelling Away" (from Ancestry In Progress by Zap Mama feat. Talib Kweli & Common, 2004)	3:46
