= Mos Dub =

Remix album by Max Tannone
- Released: April 6th, 2010
- Genre: Hip hop, reggae
- Label: Self-released
- Producer: Max Tannone

Mos Dub is a mashup album of Mos Def and various classic reggae samples that was mixed and produced by New York producer Max Tannone. The album was officially released to download on April 6, 2010.

== Style ==
Editing tracks from popular dub music, like King Tubby, Lee Perry, Scientist, the Slickers, Johnny Osbourne, Big Youth and Dawn Penn, and laying the a cappella tracks from Mos Def, Tannone has created a unique atmosphere where both Brooklyn hip hop and Jamaican reggae have been mixed seamlessly. The tracks have been described, in a positive way, as not sounding like part of a mashup, and Mos Def's raps as fitting over the music naturally.

Mos Dub was released as a free download on April 6, 2010, off of the official Mos Dub website. There is also an unofficial vinyl release of the album.

Tannone released a followup to Mos Dub, called Dub Kweli.

== Reception ==
Professional ratings
Review scores
Source	Rating
Vice	(unfavorable)

Critics have generally viewed the album positively. David James Young of Sputnikmusic stated that "...Mos Dub has the perfect sound, runtime, and lyrical content to make for a great summer car-ride CD". New York described the album as "perfect summer BBQ music." MTV Music tweeted about the album. Hip-hop site Okayplayer described the album as "dope." Adam Horovitz, also known as Ad-Rock of the Beastie Boys gave his approval of the album on the day of its release in his personal blog. Also, it has been said that the album is pleasing to fans of reggae music as well.

Not all reviews have been positive; Vice stated that Mos Dub was an album that "the world doesn't really need".

== Track list ==
No.	Title	Music	Vocal sample	Length
1.	"Johnny Too Beef"	"Johnny Too Bad" (from The Harder They Come by the Slickers, 1972)	"Beef" (from Mos Definite, 2007)	3:21
2.	"History Town"	"007 (Shanty Town)" (from The Harder They Come by Desmond Dekker & the Aces, 1972)	"History" (from The Ecstatic, 2009)	3:20
3.	"Ms. Vampire Booty"	"Dance of the Vampires" (from Scientist Rids the World of the Evil Curse of the Vampires by Scientist, 1981)	"Ms. Fat Booty" (from Black on Both Sides, 1999)	4:35
4.	"In My Math"	"Your Teeth in My Neck" (from Scientist Rids the World of the Evil Curse of the Vampires by Scientist, 1981)	"Mathematics" (from Black on Both Sides, 1999)	3:49
5.	"Travellin' Underground"	"Underground" (from Super Ape by Lee Perry, 1976)	"Travellin' Man" (from Mos Definite, 2007)	4:15
6.	"Shroud the Stars"	"The Mummy Shroud" (from Scientist Rids the World of the Evil Curse of the Vampires by Scientist, 1981)	"Bright as the Stars" (from Ah Ha/Bright as the Stars, 2005)	3:16
7.	"Mr. Universe"	"Mr. D. Brown Skank" (from Trojan Dub Box Set Vol. 2 by the Observer All-Stars)	"Next Universe" (from Soundbombing, 1997)	2:54
8.	"Summertime Running"	"Running Dub" (from Black Foundation in Dub by King Tubby and Errol Thompson, 1995)	"Summertime" (from Mos Definite, 2007)	3:52
9.	"Kampala Truth Work"	"Kampala" - (from Rub A Dub by Dub Specialist) and "Truths and Rights" (from Truths and Rights by Johnny Osbourne, 1980)	"Work It Out" (from The Dangerous Mix)	2:44
10.	"Hurricane Black"	"Black Moon" (from Rebel Rock by Third World All Star)	"Hurricane" (from The Hurricane soundtrack, 1999)	3:47
