= Scientist Meets the Space Invaders =

Studio album by Scientist
- Released: 1981
- Studios: Channel One Studios, Kingston, Jamaica
- Genre: Dub
- Length: 31:50
- Label: Greensleeves GREL19
- Producers: Mickie "Roots" Scott, Linval Thompson

Scientist chronology
Big Showdown at King Tubby's (1980)	Scientist Meets the Space Invaders (1981)	Scientist Rids the World of the Evil Curse of the Vampires (1981)

Professional ratings
Review scores
Source	Rating
AllMusic	4.5/5 stars
Tom Hull – on the Web	B+

Scientist Meets the Space Invaders is a 1981 album by the dub musician Scientist.

The album was produced by Mickie "Roots" Scott and Linval Thompson. The recording was done at Channel One Studios backed by the Roots Radics, and mixed at King Tubby's. The recording was by Stanley "Barnabas" Bryan, Anthony "Crucial Bunny" Graham and Maxwell "Maxie" McKenzie. The cover artwork is by Tony McDermott.

The tracks that formed the basis of the album were Thompson productions including Wayne Wade's "Poor and Humble" ("Cloning Process"), and Johnny Osbourne's "Kiss Somebody" ("Quasar").

== Critical reception ==
Reviewing for AllMusic, Stephen Cook regarded the album as a "great dub" record and among Scientist's "essential" albums. Fellow critic Tom Hull called it "one of the more legendary" recordings in which Scientist "orchestrated dozens of mythic battles, encounters, and jams ... although it feels like something he could do dozens of times."

== Track listing ==
All tracks composed by Linval Thompson

Side one - First Wall

1. "Beam Down" - 3:20
2. "Red Shift" - 3:33
3. "Time Warp" - 2:51
4. "Cloning Process" - 4:16
5. "Pulsar" - 3:10

Side two - Second Wall

1. "Laser Attack" - 3:45
2. "Dematerialise" - 2:48
3. "Fission" - 2:35
4. "Super Nova Explosion" - 2:34
5. "Quasar" - 2:58

== Personnel ==
- Carlton "Santa" Davis, Lincoln "Style" Scott - drums
- Errol "Flabba" Holt - bass
- Noel "Sowell" Bailey, Eric "Bingy Bunny" Lamont - guitar
- Wycliffe "Steelie" Johnson, Winston Wright - organ
- Gladstone "Gladdy" Anderson - piano
- Christopher "Sky Juice" Blake, Noel "Skully" Simms - percussion

Technical

- Scientist - mixing
- Stanley "Barnabas" Bryan, Anthony "Crucial Bunny" Graham, Lancelot "Maxie" McKenzie - recording
- Tony McDermott - cover artwork
