= Scientist Encounters Pac-Man =

Studio album by Scientist
- Released: 1982
- Recorded: 1982
- Genre: Dub
- Length: 32:56
- Label: Greensleeves GREL 46
- Producer: Linval Thompson

Scientist Encounters Pac-Man is an album featuring the dub musician Scientist, released in 1982. It was produced by Linval Thompson and was released on Greensleeves Records. It was recorded at Channel One Studio, Kingston, Jamaica. The backing band was Roots Radics and the cover artwork was by Tony McDermott.

== Critical reception ==
Professional ratings
Review scores
Source	Rating
AllMusic	4/5 stars
Tom Hull – on the Web	B+

AllMusic wrote that Scientist "delivers one of his most progressive mixes here, deconstructing the originals down to their skeletal base and adding just the right amount of mixing board-generated Echoplex and reverb."

== Track listing ==
All tracks composed by Linval Thompson

1. "Under Surveillance" – 2:56
2. "Prince's Wrath" – 3:08
3. "Space Invaders Re-Group" – 3:18
4. "World Cup Squad Lick Their Wounds" – 3:58
5. "Vampire Initiative" – 3:08
6. "Malicious Intent" – 3:41
7. "The Dark Secret of the Box" – 3:47
8. "S.O.S." – 3:31
9. "Man-Trap" – 3:01
10. "Look Out – Behind You!" – 2:33
