= Slakness =

Slakness in the Anglophone Caribbean vernacular such as Patois, Creole, and Creolese is catalogued as deviant behavior. Specifically, women's sexually expressive and suggestive conduct is deemed loose and vulgar, and as a result is considered 'Slakness.' Socially codified as licentious and promiscuous, slakness is often synonymous with badness which informed the notion of the "rude boy" trope in Jamaican popular culture; inspiring the interrogation of the politics of respectability that was pervasive during the immediate post emancipation1960s period. The cultural interconnectedness, and at times interchangeability, of slakness and badness has resulted in instances of twenty first century cultural reconceptualization and deployment in postcolonial Caribbean feminist theorizing; this is evidenced in dancehall music by artists such as Tanya Stephens and Ce'cile.

== Dancehall music and cultural expression ==
In both the global and local imaginary, dancehall music is often celebrated as a radical centering of the "everyday." A particularly Jamaican tradition, its adult lexicon and stylistic nature espouses ambivalence regarding sexuality which is seen as epitomizing Slakness. Through dancehall music's association with slakness, it has garnered the ire of local elites within the middle class and upper middle class. Synonymous with the slave plantation's "prejudicial attitude towards enslaved peoples' merrymaking, Jamaica's middle-classes often, bear a very strong anti-dancehall animus, which sometimes also overlaps with some outsider [...] responses."

== Dancehall songs and albums with Slakness content ==
- Glendon "Admiral" Bailey's "Punany"
- General Echo's "Bathroom Sex"
- General Echo's Slackest LP In The World
- Yellowman's "Cocky Did A Hurt Me" and "Bedroom Mazuka"
- Welton Irie's production of Joe Gibbs X-rated LP It Feels So Good
- Grindsman's "Benz Punany"
- Lovindeer's self produced "The Oil" and "Pant Size"
- Tommy Cowan and Johnny Ringo's "Two Lesbians Hitch"
- Tanya Stephens' Taak Up Wats Yu [S]touri
- Tanya Stephens' Gangsta Blues
- Ce'cile's Bad Gyal Medley
- Tanya Stephens' "Little White Lie," "Its a Pity," "Tek Him Back (Tek Im Bak)"
