= Zhuo Mao =

Chinese Han dynasty official

- 卓茂
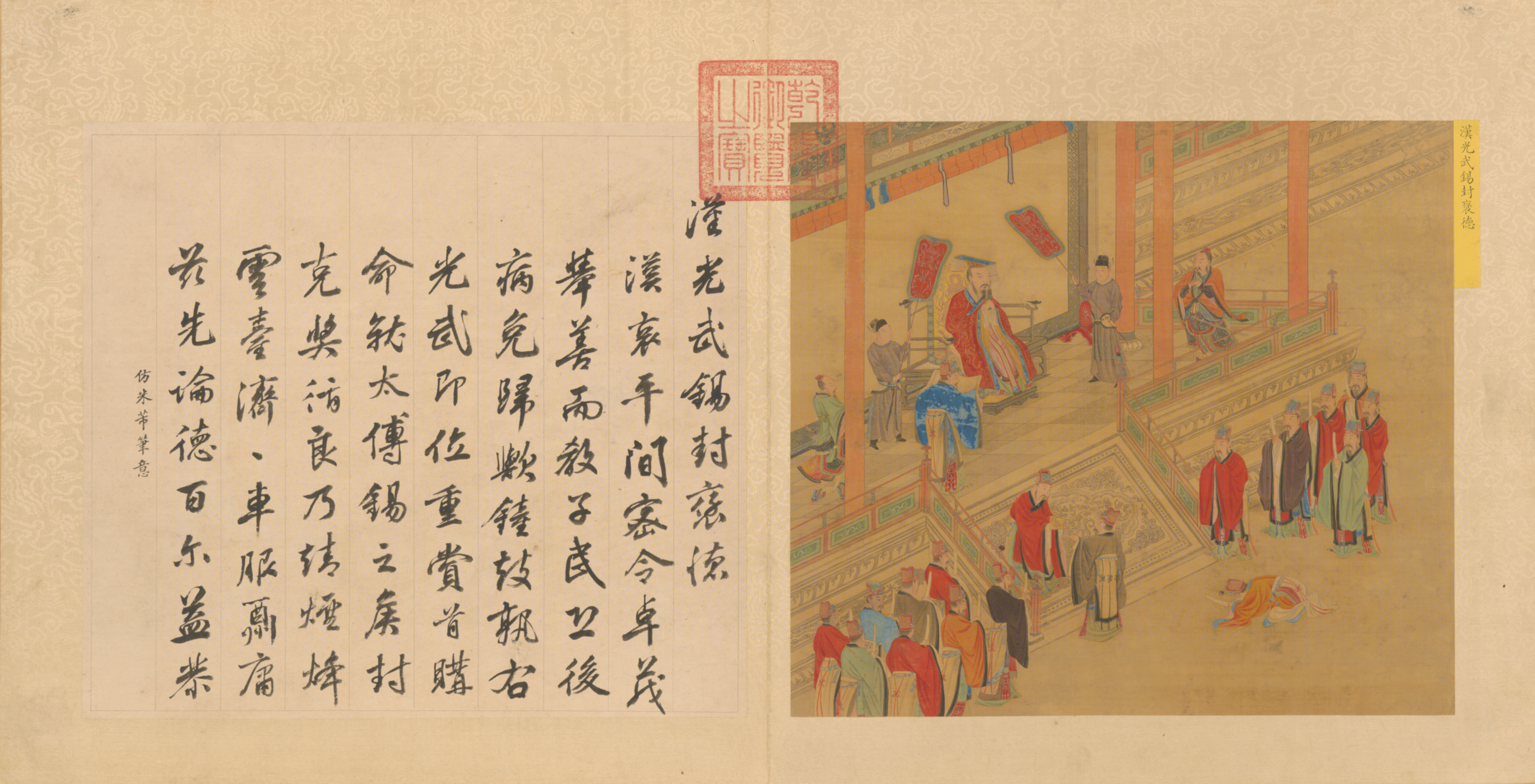
- Qing dynasty painting by Chen Shu depicting Emperor Guangwu of Han conferring honors on Zhuo Mao (褒德侯), in the collection of the Palace Museum, Beijing.

Grand Tutor (太傅)

Marquis of Baode (褒德侯)
- In office 25 CE – 28 CE
- Monarch: Emperor Guangwu of Han

Metropolitan Assistant (京部丞)
- In office c. 4 CE – 6 CE
- Monarch: Emperor Ping of Han (Wang Mang administration)

Magistrate of Mi County (密县令)
- In office c. 5 BCE – c. 4 CE
- Monarch: Emperor Ai of Han

Personal details
- Born: c. 50 BCE Wan County, Nanyang Commandery (present-day Nanyang, Henan)
- Died: 28 CE

Zhuo Mao (c. 50 BCE – 28 CE), courtesy name Zikang (子康), was a Chinese official who lived during the late Western Han dynasty and early Eastern Han dynasty. He served as the Grand Tutor (太傅) and was enfeoffed as Marquis of Baode (褒德侯) under Emperor Guangwu of Han. He was from Wan County, Nanyang Commandery (present-day Nanyang, Henan). Highly regarded as a historical model of clean administration, his local rule was characterized by a strict focus on moral governance and Confucian values rather than penal law. He was known for his benevolent and tolerant character and for not competing with others.

== Biography ==
Zhuo Mao was from Wan County, Nanyang Commandery (present-day Nanyang, Henan). His grandfather and father both served as Commandery Administrators (郡守). During the reign of Emperor Yuan of Han, Zhuo Mao studied at the Imperial Academy (太学) in Chang'an, where he learned the Book of Songs, Book of Rites, calendrical science, and arithmetic.

During his service as a clerk in the chancellor's office, a man mistakenly believed that Zhuo Mao's horse was his own lost horse. When Zhuo Mao asked how long the horse had been missing, the man replied that it had been over a month. Zhuo Mao had used the horse for several years and knew the man was mistaken, but he still allowed him to take it. Later, the man found his own horse and went to the chancellor's office to thank Zhuo Mao.

While serving as a Gentleman Attendant (侍郎), a man reluctantly offered rice and meat to a Village Head (亭长). He later felt uneasy, believing that under good governance, the people should not fear officials, and officials should not take goods from the people. He reported this to Zhuo Mao. Zhuo Mao replied that exchanging gifts was a matter of social courtesy. The man objected, citing legal prohibitions, but Zhuo Mao argued that governing through ritual and governing through law were different, and that laws should not be applied rigidly without context.

As magistrate of Mi County (密县), Henan (present-day Xinmi, Henan), Zhuo Mao governed with great moral influence, and it was said that people would not pick up lost items on the road. His administration was reportedly so effective, that during a locust plague which devastated more than twenty counties in Henan, Mi County alone remained unaffected.

== Wang Mang’s Administration ==
In 4 CE, while Wang Mang was serving as the de facto regent of the Han court, Zhuo Mao was promoted to the capital as a Metropolitan Assistant (京部丞) under the Ministry of Agriculture. When he left Mi County to take up his new post in Chang'an, local residents of all ages wept openly along the roads as he departed.

In 6 CE, after Wang Mang's usurpation, Zhuo Mao immediately resigned from his official position, using illness as justification to return to his home commandery.

== Eastern Han Dynasty ==
During the reign of Emperor Gengshi, Zhuo Mao was summoned to serve as Gentleman Consultant (侍中祭酒). In his seventies, he traveled to Chang'an, but upon witnessing the disorder of the time, he retired due to age.

In the first year of the Jianwu era (25 CE), Emperor Guangwu of Han sought out Zhuo Mao to signal a cultural restoration of Confucian ethics in the newly established Eastern Han dynasty. Zhuo Mao met him at Heyang. In the ninth month of Jianwu 1, on the “甲申” day, he was appointed Grand Tutor (太傅) and enfeoffed as the Marquis of Baode (褒德侯), a title meaning "Marquis of Bestowed Virtue", yielding a fief of 2,000 households.

== Death ==
Zhuo Mao died in 28 CE. He was given a state funeral, and Emperor Guangwu personally attended the burial in mourning attire. His son Zhuo Chong later served as Minister of Agriculture (大司农) and was enfeoffed Marquis Fanxiang (泛乡侯).

In 60 CE, Emperor Ming of the Eastern Han dynasty honored him by hanging his portrait together with the 28 generals of the Cloud Terrace (雲台二十八將).

== Family ==
Zhuo Mao; Marquis Baode
Zhuo Rong	Zhuo Chong; Minister of Agriculture, Marquis Fanxiang
Zhuo Chen; Marquis Fanxiang
Zhuo Xin; Marquis Fanxiang
Zhuo Long; Marquis Fanxiang
