= Scientist Rids the World of the Evil Curse of the Vampires =

Studio album by Scientist
- Released: 1981
- Recorded: June 13, 1981
- Studios: Channel One Studios, Kingston, Jamaica
- Genre: Dub
- Length: 37:37
- Label: Greensleeves GREL25
- Producer: Henry "Junjo" Lawes

Scientist chronology
Scientist Meets the Space Invaders (1981)	Scientist Rids the World of the Evil Curse of the Vampires (1981)	Scientist Meets the Roots Radics (1981)

Professional ratings
Review scores
Source	Rating
Allmusic	link
Tom Hull – on the Web	A−

Scientist Rids the World of the Evil Curse of the Vampires is an album by the dub musician Scientist. It was originally released in 1981. A digitally remastered version was released by Greensleeves Records as the 25th of their Reggae Classics series in 2001.

== Album information ==
The album was produced and arranged by Henry "Junjo" Lawes. All tracks were recorded at Channel One and played by The Roots Radics Band, and mixed by Scientist at King Tubby's studio.

Scientist sourced his material for this album from artists Michael Prophet, Wailing Souls, Johnny Osbourne and Wayne Jarrett. Here are Scientist's mixes and their original equivalents:

Scientist	Originals
1. "Voodoo Curse"	"Oh What a Feeling" – Wailing Souls (Fire House Rock, 1981)
2. "Dance of the Vampires"	"You Are a No Good" – Michael Prophet (Righteous Are The Conqueror, 1980)
3. "Blood On His Lips"	"Love in My Heart" – Wayne Jarrett (Chip In, 1981)
4. "Cry of the Werewolf"	"Hold On To What You Got" – Michael Prophet (Gunman, 1981)
5. "The Mummy's Shroud"	"Fire House Rock" – Wailing Souls (Fire House Rock, 1981)
6. "The Corpse Rises"	"Bandits Taking Over" – Wailing Souls (Fire House Rock, 1981)
7. "Night of the Living Dead"	"Youthman" – Michael Prophet (Gunman, 1981)
8. "Your Teeth In My Neck"	"Love and Unity" – Michael Prophet (Gunman, 1981)
9. "Plague of Zombies"	"He Can Surely Turn The Tide" – Johnny Osbourne (Fally Lover, 1981)
10. "Ghost of Frankenstein"	"Sweet Loving" – Michael Prophet (Gunman, 1981)

== Grand Theft Auto III ==
Several tracks from the album ("Dance of the Vampires", "The Mummy's Shroud", "The Corpse Rises", "Your Teeth In My Neck" and "Plague of Zombies") were featured in the soundtrack to the popular video game Grand Theft Auto III. They comprised the fictional radio station K-Jah and were the inspiration for many of the DJ's irreverent-sounding comments.

Despite being paid a royalty on these and all recordings he made for Henry "Junjo" Lawes, Scientist sued Greensleeves Records unsuccessfully in a US court. The court ruled that according to precedent a recording mixer was not considered the author of a musical work, and so Rockstar were correct to treat the producer Henry "Junjo" Lawes as the copyright holder of the album.

== Track listing ==
1. "Voodoo Curse" – 3:48
2. "Dance of the Vampires" – 3:26
3. "Blood On His Lips" – 3:00
4. "Cry of the Werewolf" – 4:25
5. "The Mummy's Shroud" – 4:25
6. "The Corpse Rises" – 3:27
7. "Night of the Living Dead" – 4:14
8. "Your Teeth In My Neck" – 4:38
9. "Plague of Zombies" – 2:49
10. "Ghost of Frankenstein" – 3:24

== Personnel ==
- Errol "Flabba" Holt – Bass guitar
- Lincoln "Style" Scott – Drums
- Carlton "Santa" Davis – Drums
- Noel "Sowell" Bailey – Rhythm Guitar
- Eric "Bingy Bunny" Lamont – Rhythm Guitar
- Gladstone "Gladdy" Anderson – Piano
- Ansel Collins – Keyboards
- Winston Wright – Organ
- Winston "Bo Peep" Bowen – Lead Guitar
- Alan Bassford – Lead Guitar
- Noel "Scully" Simms – Percussion
- Uziah "Sticky" Thompson – Percussion
- Christopher "Sky Juice" Blake – Percussion

Horns

- "Deadly" Headley Bennett – Saxophone
- Dean Fraser – Saxophone
- Ronald "Nambo" Robinson – Trombone

Technical

- Henry Junjo Lawes - production, arrangements
- Scientist - mixing at King Tubby's Studios
- Tony McDermott - cover artwork
