= Psychedelic Woman =

Song by Honny & the Bees Band
- Language: English
- Released: 1973
- Recorded: Ghana
- Genre: Afrobeat
- Length: 4:31
- Songwriter(s): Ernest Honny

"Psychedelic Woman" is a 1973 Ghanaian song by Honny & the Bees Band. It was written and sung by Ernest Aubrey Honny, who worked mainly as a session keyboardist and recording engineer. Over a medium-tempo groove, the song begins with a spoken-word story concerning a "psychedelic woman" first spotted at a nightclub. The story ends with a transitional climax to a sung chorus of several voices. There are several more choruses, interspersed with solo singing, then a funky, jazzy electric organ solo, finishing with a brief recap of singing. Part and parcel of the afrobeat sound then becoming popular in Ghana, influences include reggae, James Brown, and perhaps even Britain's mods.

Thirty years later it gained a new audience outside of Africa through its inclusion in multiple compilations of 1970's-era African music. Critics highlighted the song in their reviews:

- "Many of the best original tracks are from the 1970s, when west African music was still largely ignored in the west, and they range from the pounding and jazzy Psychedelic Woman by Ghana's Honny and the Bees through to..." – The Guardian
- "'Psychedelic Woman' is irresistible simply because it's so cheesy (but also very good)." – Allmusic
- "Wild, kitschy" – National Public Radio
- "Choice cut" – Robert Christgau
- "A stunning collision of Western and African music in which both get their big moments" – Pitchfork

The original was released as a 45 rpm by Essiebons, backed with "Kofi Salanga" and credited to "Honey and Bees Band".

== Compilations ==
- Africa Express Presents... (Ariola Express, 2009). Included at the request of Fatboy Slim.
- Ghana Soundz: Afrobeat, Funk and Fusion in the 70's (Soundway, 2003)
- Rare Trax Vol. 58 - Let There Be Drums! - Afrobeat Reloaded (Rolling Stone Germany, 2008)
- Sound Affects (Mr. Bongo, 2006)

== Remixes ==
- A 2005 remix by Bonobo has itself been included on several compilations.
- A mashup version was included on the 2011 album Ghostfunk, produced by Max Tannone, which features a combination of afrobeat and vocal tracks by rapper Ghostface Killah.

== Personnel ==
- Ernest Aubrey Honny - vocals, electric organ
- Bob Pinodo - vocals
