= Bob Andy =

Jamaican vocalist and songwriter (1944–2020)

Bob Andy CD
- Bob Andy in 1998

Background information
- Born: Keith Anderson; 28 October 1944; Kingston, Colony of Jamaica, British Empire
- Died: 27 March 2020 (aged 75) Kingston, Jamaica
- Genres: Rocksteady, reggae
- Instruments: Vocalist, songwriter
- Years active: Mid-1960s–2020
- Labels: Studio One, Trojan, I-Anka
- Formerly of: The Paragons, Bob and Marcia

Keith Anderson CD (28 October 1944 – 27 March 2020), better known by the stage name Bob Andy, was a Jamaican reggae vocalist and songwriter. He was widely regarded as one of reggae's most influential songwriters.

== Early life ==
Anderson was born in Kingston, Jamaica, in October 1944, where his mother worked at Up-Park Camp. At the age of seven he moved to live with his grandmother in Westmoreland. After his grandmother died, his mother gave him away, and he was subject to beatings at the hands of his adoptive parents.

After several years he returned to Kingston to help look after one of his siblings, but to escape beatings from his mother, he tried to get a place at Maxfield Park children's home by telling them that his mother had died. They both ended up in court, where he was made a ward of the state and returned to Maxfield Park. At the home, he taught himself to play piano, and began singing in the Kingston Parish Church choir. In the local scout troop he met Tyrone Evans, with whom he formed the Binders.

== Career ==
Bob Andy was one of the founding members of The Paragons, along with Tyrone Evans and Howard Barrett, with John Holt later joining briefly before being replaced by Vic Taylor. Andy left after Holt rejoined and worked for Studio One delivering records and songwriting before embarking on a solo career.

His first solo hit record in 1967, "I've Got to Go Back Home", was followed by "Desperate Lover", "Feeling Soul", "Unchained", and "Too Experienced". He also composed songs for other reggae artists, including "I Don't Want to See You Cry" for Ken Boothe, and "Feel Like Jumping", "Truly", and "Melody Life" for Marcia Griffiths. He had several hits in the late 1960s, including "Going Home", "Unchained", "Feeling Soul", "My Time", "The Ghetto Stays in the Mind", and "Feel the Feeling". Some of these, and his 1992 hit, "Fire Burning", have come to be regarded as reggae standards and several have been covered several times by other artists.

In the early 1970s, he recorded with Marcia Griffiths as Bob and Marcia, initially for Studio One, but later under producer "Harry J" Johnson's tutelage. They had a major hit in the UK with "Young, Gifted and Black" (with orchestral backing added for the UK market) and spent time there promoting it, touring with Elton John and Gilbert O'Sullivan. When the tour ended they were still not getting any money, and were told by people in England that Harry J had got the cash. They returned to Jamaica. Andy said "when we left Jamaica, Harry J did not have a studio. When we came back, he had a studio and a brand new Benz."

He continued without Johnson's involvement and returned to the UK, where he recorded "Pied Piper" with Griffiths and they toured again. "Pied Piper" gave them another top 20 hit, but the duo was dissolved when Griffiths joined the I Threes.

Disillusioned with the industry, in 1978 Andy put his music career on hold and after attending creative dancing classes with the Jamaica School of Dance (now the Edna Manley College of the Visual and Performing Arts), concentrated on his career as an actor, starring in the films Children of Babylon in 1980, and The Mighty Quinn (1989). He relocated to London, where he worked as a producer and recorded with Mad Professor, for whom he recorded a dub version of his Song Book album. Later, Andy moved to Miami.

In 1997 he released a new album, Hangin' Tough, produced by Willie Lindo.

Andy toured Africa for the first time in 2005, performing at the Bob Marley 60th birthday concert in Addis Ababa, and while in Ethiopia also sang at the President's Palace and gave benefit concerts for the Twelve Tribes organization at the Rastafari movement settlement at Shashamane.

The Jamaican government conferred the Order of Distinction in the rank of Commander (CD) on Andy in October 2006 for his contributions to the development of Jamaican music.

In March 2015, Andy was mugged on Mona Road in St. Andrew and robbed of JA$50,000 and two cellphones, the assailant slashing his left arm with a knife in the attack.

The late Michael Prophet cited Andy as his main influence as a singer.

Andy died of pancreatic cancer on 27 March 2020, aged 75.

== Discography ==
=== Albums ===
- Bob Andy's Song Book (1970), Studio One
- Lots of Love and I (1978), High Note
- Friends (1983), I-Anka
- Freely (1988), I-Anka
- Bob Andy's Dub Book (1994), I-Anka
- Hanging Tough (1997), VP
- Reggae Land (2006), Upstairs Music

Compilations

- Retrospective (1986), I-Anka
- Songbook (1988), Studio One
- Fire Burning (1995), Sanctuary

Bob and Marcia

- Young Gifted and Black (1970), BMG / Sanctuary
- Pied Piper (1971), Trojan

Cover versions of Bob Andy songs

- We Remember Bob Andy (2023), VP

== Songwriting credits ==
- "Check It Out" – Tony Rebel
- "Feel Like Jumping" – Marcia Griffiths
- "Fire Burning" – Tony Rebel, Marcia Griffiths
- "Half Idiot" – Cutty Ranks
- "I've Got to Go Back Home" – Freddie McGregor
- "Melody Life" – Steely & Clevie
- "My Time" – Gregory Isaacs, Barrington Levy, Ocean Colour Scene
- "Peace of Mind" – Harry J & His Friends
- "Really Together" – Jeb Loy Nichols
- "The Right Track" – Mickey General
- "Too Experienced" – The Bonedaddys, Ms. Dynamite
- "Unchained" – Sanchez

== See also ==
- List of reggae musicians
- List of roots reggae artists
- Trojan Records
