= Johnny Ringo (disambiguation) =

Johnny Ringo (1850–1882) was an American Old West outlaw.

John Ringo or Johnny Ringo may also refer to:

== People ==
- John Ringo (born 1963), American author
- Johnny Ringo (musician) (1961–2005), Jamaican reggae deejay

== Other uses ==
- "Johnny Ringo", the third episode of the 1966 Doctor Who serial The Gunfighters
- Johnny Ringo (TV series), a Western television series
