= History of Scotiabank Caribbean Carnival Toronto =

History of Scotiabank Toronto Caribbean Carnival is primarily the history of Caribana, given it used the name for most of its original years.

- History of Caribana (1967–71)

== 1990s ==
=== 1992 ===
1992-08-01
1.1 M or 1.5 M or 1.2

After the event, the City of Toronto forgave its outstanding debt. Hotel partnership formed.

=== 1993 ===
1993-07-19
1 M

In May, Caribana fired its operating chief. The Official Caribana Store and The Carnival Shop, located at College Park, and an Eaton's Caribana Shop at the Toronto Eaton Centre. At launch in Nathan Phillips Square, Premier Bob Rae calls the event a "beacon of hope" for all Canadians, as a symbol of racial harmony. "Carry a Can to Caribana" launched, in support of Daily Bread Food Bank. Caribana Marketplace covered market added at Marilyn Bell Park. Non-profit Antillana, which promotes francophone culture in Metro Toronto, brought groups from French Caribbean countries. A well-behaved crowd and barricades along the entire parade route contributed to an incident-free parade. 28C weather resulted in 60 cases of heat exhaustion. Many bands used the environment as a theme. "Wow Donkey" was the unofficial anthem of the year. With attendance down, the board chair blamed the federal and provincial tourism ministries for not funding their American advertising campaign. He continued that a "costume can cost $11,000. It's time that Caribana had the same respect as the National Ballet. It's not perceived as a serious cultural and economic force by the moguls in government who are still using the European definition of culture." |}
