= History of Caribana =

Festival history

Now known as the Toronto Caribbean Carnival, Caribana began as a one-time celebration of the Canadian Centennial in Ontario's provincial capital city. The festival continues to bring a full display of Caribbean culture and traditions, attracting more than a million viewers each year. Caribana has continued to draw people from across the world to Toronto, with travellers coming from places such as the Caribbean, Europe and the United States.

Onlookers get to see a variety of colourful costumes as participants play mas in a variety of events such as The Grand Parade, Junior King & Queen Showcase, King & Queen Showcase, Junior Carnival Parade and more. Spectators are exposed to a variety of Caribbean music and sounds such as soca, chutney soca, calypso, reggae and dancehall, r&b and hip hop along with sounds from instruments such as the steelpan. Festival attendees also get a chance to try a variety of Caribbean foods such as jerk chicken, roti, black pudding, rum cake, roasted fish and more.

The festival takes place during late July to the first few days of August, coinciding with Emancipation Day and its commemoration of the abolition of slavery in British colonies in the nineteenth century. Caribana includes the tradition of "parading" through the streets, originating from celebrations of freedom from enslavement in the 19th century.

Within the first five years, 1967 to 1971, the festival aimed to share West Indian (Black Canadian, Indo-Caribbean and Chinese-Caribbean) culture with the community at large, and to fund the creation of a permanent West Indian cultural centre. During the era, the festival took an early shape, different from recent celebrations, growing and gaining the support of the City and Toronto's Protestant Caucasian majority. The event attracted Caribbean country leaders and top musical and stage acts to supplement the parade. In late 1968, a new festival called Carnival Toronto was proposed; receiving government funding, Caribana resisted their merger attempts, which sought to combine several existing festivals into one event. The event was largely unsuccessful, ending after one year. Four largely peaceful years were marred in 1971 by a car accident causing parade route deaths, and public transit fumbles which led to fighting.

The festival has a long history since its beginnings in 1967, where multiple changes took place between the 1970s to the early 1990s. During this time, the Caribbean Cultural Committee and Caribana had undergone route changes, financial issues, an increase and decrease in spectators and participants, negative media attention, along with a rise in violence and an increasing police presence at various events within the festival.

The goal of establishing Caribana within the African Canadian/Caribbean community was to build it into "a cultural force that would support the community and enhance the wider city of Toronto."

News outlets such as The Toronto Star, The Globe and Mail, and Caribbean-Canadian community newspapers such as Share and Caribbean Camera have played a crucial role in reporting information focused on the festival.

== Origins ==
Caribana is based on Carnival in Trinidad and Tobago and has become a festival to celebrate and reflect Caribbean culture on a whole. The carnival tradition derives from traditions within Trinidad in the 19th century. Carnival originally began as a festival that took place before Lent for only the elite White French and French Creole population in Trinidad. This festival involved African and Afro-Creole masks and costumes, where the festival took place within the fields of plantations or in the streets of Port of Spain. African folk developed their own festivities, known as cannes brûlées or canboulay. Enslaved Africans would mimic French enslavers by painting their faces White and dressing in eccentric costumes.

After their freedom from enslavement, their festival had evolved and inevitably caused White elites to retreat from the Carnival space in Trinidad. Emancipation gave way to this disruption and created a change as this Euro-Catholic tradition had been transformed into an Afro-Trinidadian tradition. These roots trace back to Caribana today.

== 1967–1971 ==
=== 1967 ===
==== Planning and proposal ====
Across the country, the Canadian Centennial was celebrated by the federal, provincial, and municipal governments with an array of special projects, events, and other creations. Along with government projects, other groups started their own events to celebrate. Among the happenings on Toronto's Centre Island was a hedge maze, the newly created Centreville Amusement Park, and Caribana, a festival for the Caribbean population of 12,000 in Toronto. The Toronto Star said that the event "plans to blow the Centennial works in a whing-ding, one-week celebration designed to pale the '67 efforts of any other Metro "ethnic" community." Organized over nine months, its committee included a doctor, two lawyers, a town planner, and a teacher, all Caribbean emigrants working in Metro Toronto.

During a late 1966 meeting at a downtown Toronto firehall, it was decided that the concept of carnival was universal amongst Caribbean cultures, and Trinidad and Tobago's celebrations were the best model. The August long weekend was chosen for its heat and low chance of rain.

On February 21, 1967, Caribbean Centennial Committee executive chairman Samuel A. Cole sent a letter requesting "permission to stage an exhibition of West Indian trade and cultural achievements at Olympic Island during the period of August 5 to 12, 1967:

The purpose of this show is to celebrate Canada's centenary and will take the form of a West Indian salute to the people of Metropolitan Toronto.... We are confident that the atmosphere generated and the activities offered would attract a much larger crowd than usual to the Toronto Islands.

It was also felt that if some trade and cultural exhibits could be included a more serious group of persons would be encouraged to visit and enjoy the benefits of Toronto Island Park. The project has the full support and co- operation of the Toronto Citizens Centenary Committee and was in large part made possible through their good offices.

We have now had opportunity to communicate a manifestation of interest to the Governments of the West Indies and to send a Mission there. It is my pleasure to inform you that the initial reaction of most of these Governments has been quite favourable, and we are at present negotiating with them the specific types of exhibits and artists that would best be suited to an exhibition of this nature.

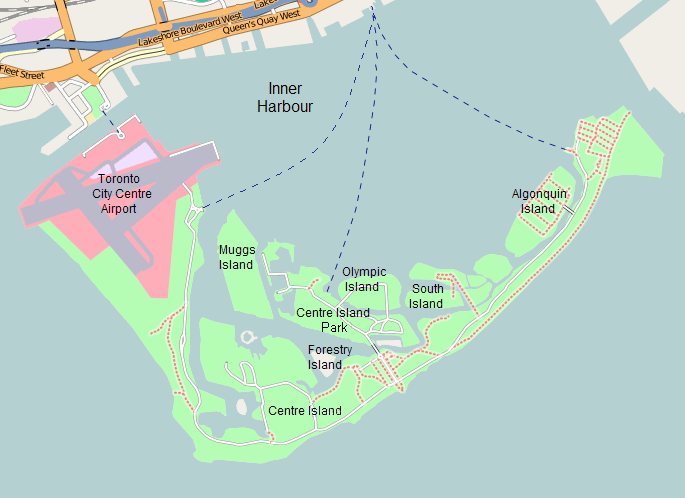
Map of the Toronto Islands

The Metropolitan Parks Commissioner issued a report to the Parks and Recreation Committee on March 6, recommending the approval of a "Caribbean Centennial project at Olympic Island, Toronto Island". Thompson asked that approval be granted, with all details approved by the Metropolitan Parks Commissioner, and he asked to be authorized to co-operate with the group, so long as no direct costs were incurred to Metro.

==== Events ====
The Caribbean Centennial Committee announced the "Caribana '67 Week" event on July 12. On Olympic Island event was to include the importation of coconut trees. The group sought information from the parks department "officers regarding irrigation systems and turf repair", in relation to planting tropical trees. The event would represent the 10 "main" Caribbean islands, plus Bermuda and Guyana. The event would include "a series of performances covering steel bands, calypso, dance, drama, night club and variety acts, films, water-skiing, kids' carnivals and adult carnivals." Calypso ferry cruises, teen fashion shows, a Caribbean fruit and vegetable market, Caribbean Queen contest, and the "usual" booths. A water-skiing festival was held on the island, simultaneously, on the weekend.

Byron Lee and the Dragonaires were featured at a semi-formal ball at Casa Loma, August 4. The ball would become an annual tradition for some years, rotating from location-to-location.

The parade launched the week's public events, heading from Varsity Stadium down University Avenue, to a reception at City Hall with Mayor William Dennison, and onto the docks. "As a carnival style parade, it'll be wide open to anybody who feels in the mood." Event chairman Dr. J. A. Liverpool explained to The Star that participants paid $10 or more for their costumes, which cost $30 to $40 a piece. Liverpool told that the subsidy was because "many of the paraders have jobs as maids or clerks." The Star reported with a single photograph, captioned that "a mile-long carnival procession of a thousand people in gaily-colored costumed gyrating to the music of five calypso bands." Ten of the floats and a thousand paraders didn't leave the stadium until 11:30 am, despite a 9:30 am start time. Dr. J. Alban told the Toronto Telegram that "West Indian time is different than North American time." The first parade attracted 50,000 spectators, but given Torontonian's typical reserve, it was considered quite quiet, compared to other carnivals.

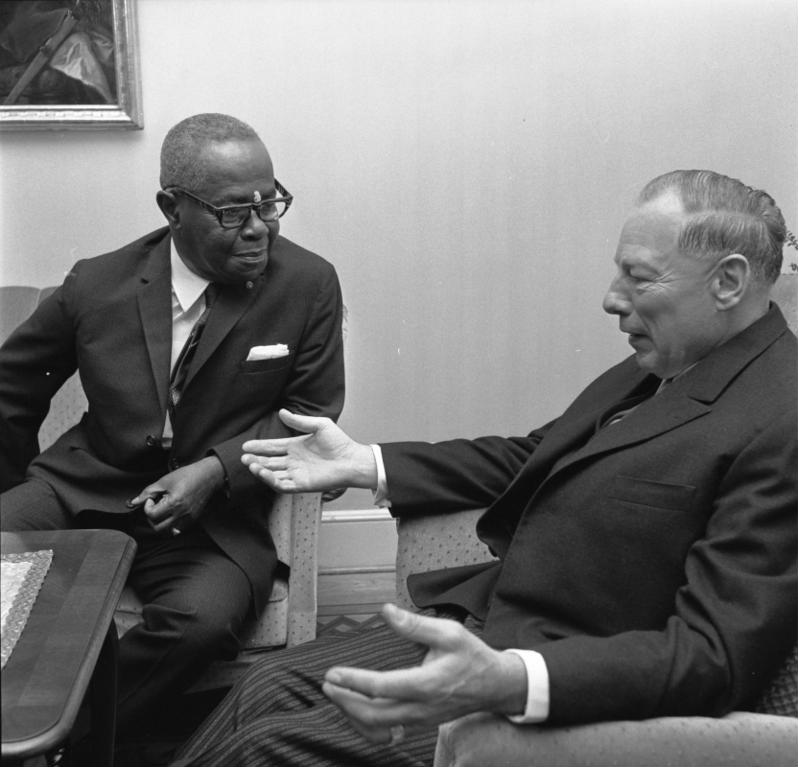
Clifford Clarence Campbell (left) visited Caribana in its final day.

On Sunday, August 6, the concerts on the Toronto Islands attracted 32,000, "a record mob"; "statistically, Caribana '67 is the event of the year". The Trinidadian performers from Expo 67 performed hourly from 6 to 10 pm on one day, the Journard Trinidad Players performed at their top level, despite no chance to rest after their trip from Montreal. There was a rainstorm at the start of the show, and a steel band played three numbers in the dark, flawlessly, when the lights short-circuited. Thanks to popular demand, Caribana '67 was extended an additional day, to the next Sunday. That final day set a one-day record for ferry use of 35,000, upping the old record by 3,000. Governor-General of Jamaica Sir Clifford Campbell, the first Jamaican-born Governor-General of that country, made a surprise guest appearance when returning home from Expo 67.

The entire event was to cost $50,000. Only $4,000 of that was contributed in advance, the rest being "paid as they occur by scores of West Indian Canadians." The Ontario Centennial Commission contributed $1,000 in advance. Within two months before the event, the "big islands" decided to send exhibits, but none funded the event. A group of sponsors agreed to cover any debt at the end of the festival, if box office tallies failed to result in a profit. If a profit was reached, it was to go to establishing a West Indian cultural centre.

During the final Saturday and Sunday of the event, the Trinidad Theatre Workshop performed at the Central Library's theatre; founder Derek Walcott would earn a Nobel Prize in 1992. The troupe came for free, with only airfare, room, and board covered, to perform the world premiere of Walcott's play "Dream on Monkey Mountain", and two one act plays the following night, "Albee's Zoo Story" and "Walcott's Journard: A Comedy Until the Last Minute". The group had performed in open air, as Caribana organizers had provided, but the plays were drowned out by crowd noise. The library was arranged at the last minute.

==== Reception ====
Integration is something that can only be effected when people can give as well as take. Culture could be the beginning of this. Unless I can project myself into your culture and you into mine, we are not equal. Caribana '67 is showing people that it is more pleasant not to disregard us.

— Trevor Clarke, a businessman in attendance

Toronto Mayor William Dennison urged festival chairman Sam Cole to make the event an annual one. Parks commission Tommy Thompson agreed, having participated in the event himself, and estimating the island's year-end attendance would have set an all-time record. Boat crews abandoned their schedules, simply going to and from the islands as fast as possible, with the sole off-duty crew called on-duty, and the boats running to midnight, an hour past their normal stop. Chairman Cole agreed the group would try to organize a follow-up event: "We made a few mistakes, wasted a little time and money. But it was worth it. It's been very successful and next time we'll know what pitfalls to avoid. One will be to forget any attempt to raise contributions or assistance from businesses."

The organization began a year-round presence. The Caribana Serenaders performed at the Royal York hotel on Boxing Day, during the Mayor's annual clinic for the Canadian Red Cross Society.

=== 1968 ===
Scheduled to run from July 31 to August 7, the second annual event was to launch with a steel band performance at the Canada Trust Tower, however the local musician union asked them not to play, as they hadn't been informed in advance; Hell's Gate of Antigua did manage to perform at Queen's Park. A grand ball at the Royal York hotel on August 2 picked the king and queen.

Events on the island attracted 25,000 Saturday, 34,000 Sunday, and 31,000 Monday; none of the days beat the one-day record of 38,000, set on July 14. More than 5,000 watched the parade. Reports of the event were limited, merely leading a story about the Simcoe Day weekend, which included notes on attendance at attractions like Fort York and the Tapawingo galleries near Kleinberg. Soon after the event, a letter to the editor complained of the lack of queuing at the Toronto Island ferries; as of 2011, this issue remains for the Toronto Island ferries. The parade ended up losing money.

By year's end, the event would have a challenge. Metro Toronto council approved creation of a week-long Carnival Toronto, aiming to rival Mardi Gras. Chairman John Fisher of the newly formed Friends of the Carnival, Inc. conceived the event as being 2 million people "expressing themselves in an organized week of gaiety, frivolity and fun." The organization would also seek to merge the events of Caribana, the Italian Festival, Canadiana Week, Japanese Tanabata Festival, Mariposa Folk Festival, and a summer music festival, plus all Dominion Day celebrations. He asked for a grant of $20,000, with up to $50,000 later; council indicated this level of support would only be given after a report by Metro's information officer.

=== 1969 ===
A pre-carnival dance was held July 4 at St. Lawrence Market, and a Caribbean-themed art exhibition at the Richview branch of the Etobicoke Library.

The 1969 parade went from Varsity Stadium to the ferry docks. More than 75,000 watched the parade, in which 2000 performed. In the opening weekend, 30,000 visited in the Island. Cost of the festival was estimated to be $45,000, and they hoped to break even. Final stats found 54,000 visited the Island. Johnny Cayonne was a permanent staffer for the Caribana Cultural Committee, (the organization took its name January 15, having incorporated as "Caribbean Committee for Cultural Advancement"). Admission to the Olympia Beach event was reduced from $2 the previous year, to $1.

A variety of events were planned by the group, for the rest of the year. The Caribana Players performed Errol Hill's comedic play "Strictly Matrimony" at the West Indian Federation club on Brunswick Avenue, from Sunday, July 13 to Friday, July 18. The group debuted two new productions at the Colonnade Theatre in November 1969, and another production at Woodbine Inn, the bar of the Constellation Hotel, early the next year. Plans in August were to schedule an event for the winter, "Calysopra". There is no evidence in mainstream newspapers that this event actually ran.

=== 1970 ===
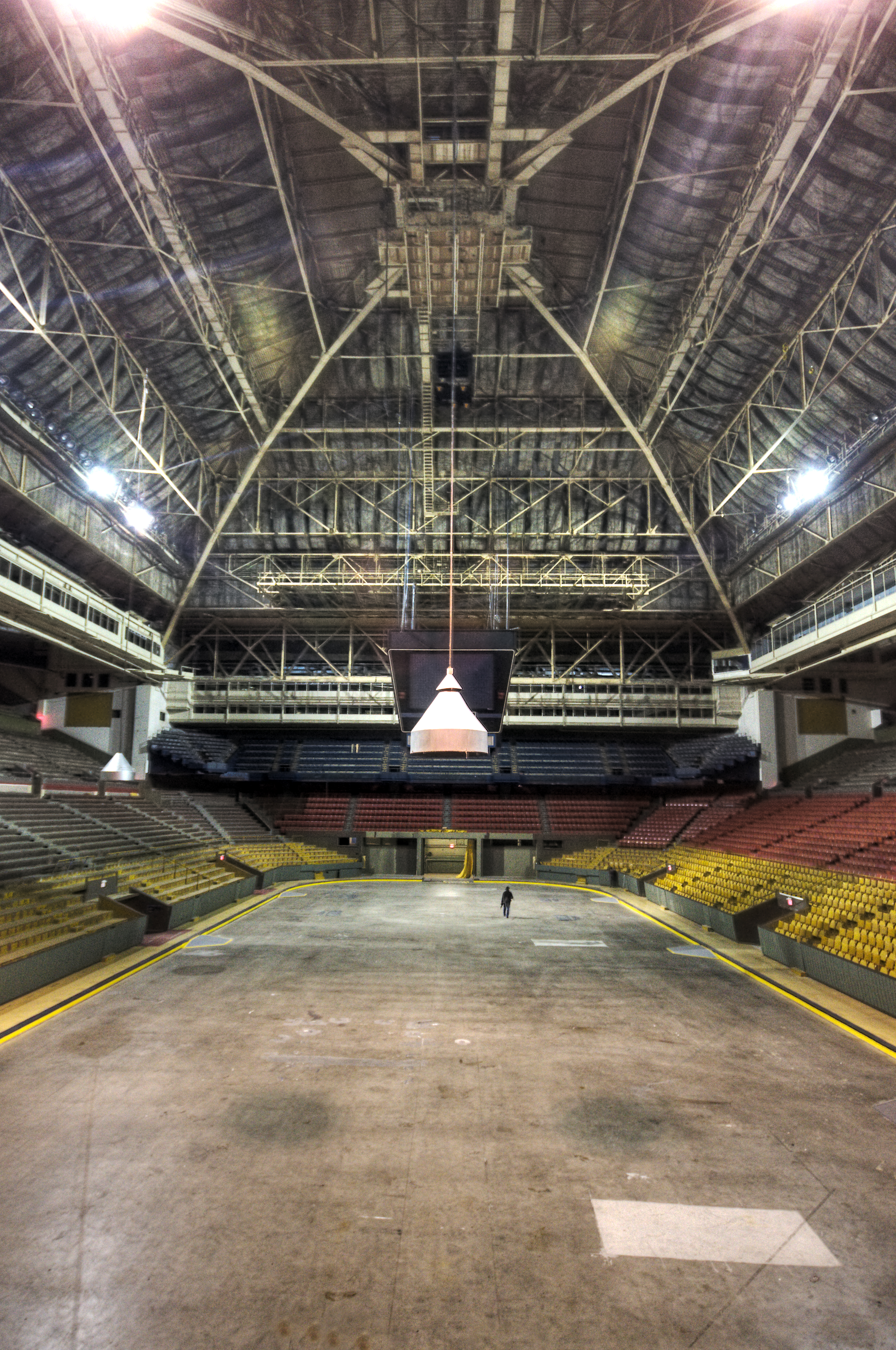
Maple Leaf Gardens hosted "Extravaganza '70", with performances by Johnny Nash and The Mighty Duke.

By April, the Caribbean Cultural Committee had moved into new offices at 1079 Bathurst Street, near Dupont Street. The space was opened up for community use, including drama and dance lessons, with the performance practice area clearly visible to the community outside.

St. Lawrence Centre for the Arts hosted a preview of Caribana on July 11, called "Caribana Kiddies Carnival Preview", a free show. The focus on kids' participation was established earlier in the year, with the announcement of a kids area. A Maple Leaf Gardens show on July 31, "Extravaganza '70", included Johnny Nash ("Cupid"), The Mighty Duke, The St. Vincent Police Steel Band, and Haitian master drummer Ti Wowo. Also included were the year's steel band competitions, calypso competition, King and Queen of the Bands, and a jump up. The show was directed by Bertrand A. Henry. Marianne Skanks, 18, a student at Vaughan Collegiate, won Miss Caribana '70.

The "Caribana Island Show" went from August 1 to 9. Attendance goals were 100,000; favourable weather brought 25,000 on the opening weekend. Their only funding this year was gate admission. At its end, total attendance had sunk to 45,000 people from 54,000. Similarly, their goal of $80,000 towards a cultural centre was dashed by bills.

The parade from Varsity Stadium to the docks on Bay Street was launched by Eric Gairy, premier of Grenada. Heading from Varsity to Bay Street, at Hayter Street it cut to Yonge Street. Travelling south on Yonge to Front Street, it then proceeded to the docks. "Thousands" lined the streets to watch. Police reported no incidents; "it was very peaceful. The people were just out to have a lot of fun."

The day after the event, Caribbean Cultural Committee director John Cayonne told the Star that festival organizers "who worked at least 15 to 17 hours a day, were not allowed to go onto the ferry ahead of crowds, even though they had identification. There's a strong possibility we won't have Caribana '71 on the island." Metro Parks Commissioner Tommy Thompson expressed doubts that community groups should be charged for using public parks, and whether they in turn should be allowed to charge for events in public parks. Both issues were raised with relation to Caribana's $3,578 debt, that Thompson was asking be forgiven. East York Mayor True Davidson scolded council members for being "petty. This is a group that is doing a good thing both for their ethnic group and for Metro. It's created a real feeling of life and excitement. Let's stop carping and pay it."

=== 1971 ===
Tommy Thompson's requests to Metro Council resulted in a $300-a-day fee be established for use of any of the Toronto Islands, for events like Caribana or the Mariposa Folk Festival, still displaced to Toronto. About a month before the event, the Metro parks committee decided "sipping Sherry... under a maple tree older than Confederation" in a member's backyard that no games of chance could be held on Toronto Island. Caribana organizers wanted to stage a lottery at the 1971 event, but Commissioner Thompson stated that it might end up encouraging people to visit the island solely in the hopes of winning money, as opposed to recreation.

The fifth time around, Caribana ran July 30 to August 8 on Olympic Island; the event was billed as being the only of its kind in North America. Ferry cruises were scheduled for the week prior, from July 27 to 29, and an "Ole Mas" costume dance was held July 24 at Ontario Science Centre. The event continued until 2 am. Eric Gairy on Grenada returned for the opening night, July 30, now Prime Minister of an independent country, joined by St. Vincent's Prime Minister Milton Cato. The parade route for the year was along from Varsity Stadium, along Bloor to Yonge, down to the ferry docks. Island events ran July 31 to August 8. Unusually, the parade was confined to just half of Yonge Street. The boat cruises featured the British West Indian Airways' Steltones. Nolan Baynes, 20, won Miss Caribana '71, and was featured on the front page of the Saturday Star.

A 51-year-old, who was watching the Caribana '71 parade with a grandson and neighbour's child, killed two people watching the parade with her car. Trying to turn left on to Yonge Street, the woman's brakes failed, the car hit a pedestrian crossing Front Street, before going through a wrought iron fence along the route, killing two brothers visiting from Washington, D.C., injuring the father of four, and 11 others. The woman was charged with "dangerous driving". A suicide closed the Yonge Street subway line on Friday evening, meaning people leaving Caribana needed to pack limited buses. By the 1:30 am Saturday morning, many became tired of waiting for additional Toronto Transit Commission (TTC) buses, having waited 40 minutes already. They packed onto buses so much "that standing passengers were forced into the laps of those sitting." Several individual fights erupted on the bus, including one "between two men over woman, who claimed one of the men had attacked her." The driver and two off-duty TTC drivers on the bus was not able to bring the passengers to order, so the driver honked his horn for a few minutes straight, until police came.

The year's events were boycotted by the Black Students Union at the University of Toronto, partly because of their feelings that the event had not developed at the speed and in the direction that some would have like. Additionally, they felt that "It is time for black people to understand that we must struggle, not dance, if we are going to survive... the line between reaction and revolution within our community is being indelibly drawn."

The year's festival attracted 45,000 people, cost $60,000, and turned a $5,000 profit. Due to low attendance during the week, the next year's festival would be reduced to just three days, and the total budget increased, partly to open food stalls and get a liquor licence to serve beer.

== 1972–1976 ==
=== 1972 ===
In 1972, the portion of the festival that had usually been held on Olympic Island had been cut down to three days, from August 5–7, due to financial issues. The full Caribana festival was usually nine days. Jacob Isaacs, Caribana's financial chairman at the time, had mentioned that with the past five Caribana festivals, he had noticed a very high overhead and low attendance. In 1971, the festival costed $60,000, had more than 45,000 people attend and a calculated profit of $5000. In 1972, the organizers had increased the budget to $80 000 - $85 000 to open more food stalls and to purchase a license to sell beer at the festival. This year, the festival received grants from the Ontario government, City of Toronto and Metro.

The route for Caribana in '72 (and for the rest of the 1970s) had travelled through Bloor and Yonge Street, and ended at the Toronto City Hall, with a concert at Nathan Phillips Square.

The parade for '72 Caribana had recorded an estimated 10,000 participants.

Heavy rain had prevented a high turnout during the last few days of the festival on Olympic Island. Caribana organizers expected 7000 people to show up for the last day, but only 2000 attended the last event.

This year, a negative public view of Caribana had shown up in some opinion articles in newspapers. These articles had mentioned complaints of mobs at Caribana, little police presence, along with mass drinking, disorderly conduct and littering issues during the '72 parade.

=== 1973 ===
The goal of the Caribana festival for '73 was to recover from the deficit of the previous year. Peter Marcelline, Caribana's Treasurer, had mentioned that if it had rained again during the festival for this year, Caribana "may have to shut up shop". Caribana received only a $2000 grant from the province and $2500 from the City of Toronto. Organizers expected a turnout of more than 40,000 out of town visitors to the festival.

At the end of the festival, Peter Marcelline estimated that close to 20,000 people attended the final three day event held at Centre Island.

=== 1974 ===
Financial issues had continued to affect the festival in 1974. The Caribbean Cultural Committee was planning to eliminate three days out of the eight day festival or cancel the whole festival altogether after the Metro Council voted against a proposed $25,000 grant. This year's festival received only a $2500 grant from the Toronto City Council and festival organizers did not receive any funding from any Caribbean governments or from the federal government.

"So many other groups get support that we're beginning to think there is something wrong with the attitude toward Black groups like ours" - Elmore Daisy, Vice-Chairman of the Caribbean Cultural Committee.

Festival organizers received a last minute bank loan of $12,000. The program for the 1974 festival included a nightclub ferry party boat that cruised around the Toronto Harbour, the Caribbean Ball at Royal York Hotel, the Parade along with events on the Toronto Islands for the three day weekend. The annual parade had seen 50,000 spectators. However, the number of people who attended the three-day event on the Toronto Islands had declined in comparison to the previous year. Only 12,000 had attended due to inclement weather affecting the islands.

Caribana's '74 program included:

- July 29 - August 1: Ferry Boat Cruises
- August 2: Caribana Carnival Ball and Miss Caribana Ball at Royal York Hotel (with music by The Trade Winds)
- August 3: Caribana Carnival Dance at Royal York Hotel (with music by The Trade Winds & Mano Marcellin Band)
- August 3: Carnival Parade
- August 3–5: Caribana on Centre Island

=== 1975 ===
For the '75 parade, at least 50,000 people were expected to attend along with 2000 participants. Artists for this year featured The Fabulous Five (Jamaican reggae group), The Troubadors (band from Barbados), G.I. Brass (from St. Kitts), Love Cats, Lord Bryner, Lord Protector, Jerry Jerome, Lord Rigby and limbo dancer Peggy Jackson.

Caribana organizers had a budget of $80,000 for this year. They received a $2500 grant from City of Toronto. They also received a $2000 donation from The Carling Community Arts Foundation along with other small donations from businesses across Toronto.

The program for the '75 Caribana festival included:

- July 29–31: Ferry Boat Cruises
- August 1: Carnival Ball at Constellation Hotel
- August 1: Carnival King & Queen at St. Lawrence Market Hall
- August 2: Carnival Parade
- August 2–4: Island Picnic

An estimated 25,000 people travelled from the U.S. to attend the Caribana festival this year. This year, there was also a trend in tourism to the Caribbean (especially in Trinidad and Tobago), which had been attributed to the success of Caribana. In turn, there were more calls for both the Canadian government and Caribbean governments to recognize the contributions Caribana has made.

Organizers had surpassed their goal of 50,000 spectators for the parade, as an estimated 100,000 people attended. The ferry boat cruises had also sold out on all 3 nights.

=== 1976 ===
This year, the organizers behind Caribana - The Carnival Development Association (more so ran the parade) and The Caribbean Cultural Committee (founded Caribana, handled other events), had disagreements surrounding events that take place on the Toronto Islands, which had created long lineups in the past. As a result, each group decided to plan separate events. Between July 30 to August 2, The Carnival Development Association put together their own activities that took place on Harbourfront, with the goal of preventing long lineups and overcrowding. The Caribbean Cultural Committee held their own festivities on Centre Island.

Another issue that was brought to attention during the '76 Caribana year was the elaborate destruction of Caribana costumes after the parade. Winston Ali, chairman of Carnival had explained that thousands of dollars are spent on creating the costumes, but they are dumped on the docks at the end of the parade. This year, the costumes were preserved and placed on display at Harbourfront for attendees to view.

The program for '76 Caribana included:

- July 27–29: Ferry Boat Cruise
- July 30: Carnival Ball at Royal York Hotel
- July 31: Carnival Dance at Royal York Hotel
- July 31: Caribana Parade
- July 30-August 2: Carnival at Harbourfront
- July 31-August 2: Carnival at Centre Island

Entertainment included: The Dominica Swinging Stars, Ken Vaughn Bryan & Orchestra, Ishan People, Mighty Beckett, The Raymond Family, Dance Power and more. Rain did fall during the parade of '76 Caribana, but it did not affect the energy of the marchers or participants.

== 1977–1981 ==
=== 1977 ===
Separatism between The Carnival Development Association and The Caribbean Cultural Committee continued during the planning for Caribana 1977. Both organizations continued to plan the grand parade together, but organized events separately throughout the festival. Despite planning a few events separately, all the events planned by both organizers complemented one another.

=== 1978 ===
This year, The Carnival Development Association did not participate in the festival due to financial strains. There were fears that Caribana would not take place this year, due to the $15,000 debt from 1977's festival. Nonetheless, Caribana had still run from August 1–7.

The program included:

- August 1–3: Ferry Boat Cruises (with music by Free Soil, Groovers Int. and Earthtones)
- August 4: Carnival Ball and Miss Caribana Contest at Royal York Hotel (with music by Byron Lee and the Dragonaires, Vic Taylor and Groovers Int.)
- August 5: Carnival Parade
- August 5: Carnival Dance (with music by Byron Lee and the Dragonaires and Earthtones)
- August 5–7: Island Festival at Olympic Island (with music by Sparrow, Rose, The Byron Lee Show, Vic Taylor and Cynthia Schloss)
- August 6: Kiddies Carnival

=== 1979 ===
The Metro Council's Budget Subcommittee approved a $7500 grant for the Caribana parade and festival. Similar to previous years, entertainment at this year's festival included a range of artists from across the Caribbean. There was music from artists such as Exile One from Dominica, Mandingo from the Virgin Islands, Kalyan from Trinidad and Tobago, The Mighty Sparrow from Grenada and more.

=== 1980 ===
For the festival this year, Caribana was operating on a $150,000 budget - a great increase from the $80,000 budget in 1972. 3000 people attended the portion of the festival that took place at Harbourfront. Also, the goal of Caribana 1980 was to help ease potential racial tensions within Toronto.

=== 1981 ===
The budget for Caribana 1981 was $300 000, another increase from previous years.

Caribana 1981's program had included:

- July 4: Miss Caribana Pageant
- July 23: Ole Mass Cruise (with music by G.I. Brass Int'l.)
- July 26: Kiddies Carnival at Minkler Auditorium
- July 28–30: Ferry Cruises (with music by G.I. Brass Int'l., Swinging Stars and Ellie Matt)
- July 31: Caribana Carnival/King and Queen Show at Varsity Stadium
- July 31: Miss Caribana Ball at Royal York Hotel (with music by the Swinging Stars)
- July 31: Caribana Dance at Macedonia Hall (with music by G.I. Brass Int'l.)
- August 1: Caribana Parade
- August 1: Calypso Show at Varsity Stadium
- August 1: Caribana Carnival Dance at Royal York Hotel (with music by G.I. Brass Int'l. and Swinging Stars)
- August 2: Caribana Reggae Explosion at Varsity Stadium (with music by Third World and Dennis Brown)
- August 2–3: Caribana Caribbean Picnic on the Toronto Islands
- August 3: Caribana Caribbean Showcase at Varsity Stadium

After this years' festival, Caribana and its committee was now sitting on $54,000 worth of debt.

== 1982–1986 ==
=== 1982 ===
Carnival 1982 was expected to attract close to 300,000 spectators from Canada, the United States and the Caribbean. The budget this year decreased from the previous year, where it only was $178 000. Organizers cut back for the parade, as it was going to be "smaller, neater and more controlled." Cuts were also seen in the absence of the Caribana Magazine and extensive advertising as well as with entertainment from artists abroad in the Caribbean.

=== 1983 ===
Caribana 1983 included harbour cruises, competitions, a calypso jam session. dances, picnics and the highlight of the festival, the parade on Saturday July 30.

A full list of the program for Caribana 1983 included:

- July 21: Ole Mas Ferry Cruise
- July 23: Caribana Dance at the Macedonian Hall
- July 24: Children's Carnival
- July 26 - July 29: Ferry Cruises each night
- July 29: Miss Caribana Ball at Royal York Hotel & King and Queen of the Bands Show at Harbourfront
- July 30: Carnival Parade, Picnic at Olympic Island, Carnival Dance at Royal York Hotel
- July 31 - Monday August 1: Picnic and entertainment at Olympic Island

An estimated 250 000 people attended Caribana events this year, proving it to be very successful. The parade had an estimated 200 000 spectators.

=== 1984 ===
This year, the Caribbean Cultural Committee created a three-year plan to take the festival out of debt, while also improving the overall image of the festival.

After a successful festival in the previous year, organizers were able to increase the overall budget to $300,000 and add more events. As a result of the new budget, a new event was added. A West Indian Dinner that honoured Caribana founders as well as business leaders were added to the programming. This year's program also included a pavilion in College Park that included workshops, arts and crafts, as well as theatre, storytelling and photo exhibits.

The 1984 Caribana parade had an estimated 200,000 people attend. Due to the number of spectators at the event, there was an increase in traffic, causing chaos throughout the streets of Toronto. The new parade route that had been implemented this year was blamed for the traffic jams. All major routes within the downtown core were either, blocked, re-routed or backed up from traffic.

During an event at the waterfront, four police officers were injured after bottles were thrown at them while trying to break up a fight. An agreement was made between both Caribana executives and Metro Police officials citing that there would need to be more enhanced security at next year's festival.

Despite the issues that affected the festival this year, the turnout allowed for major profits. The festivals' profit helped the committee to pay off its $43,000 debt.

=== 1985 ===
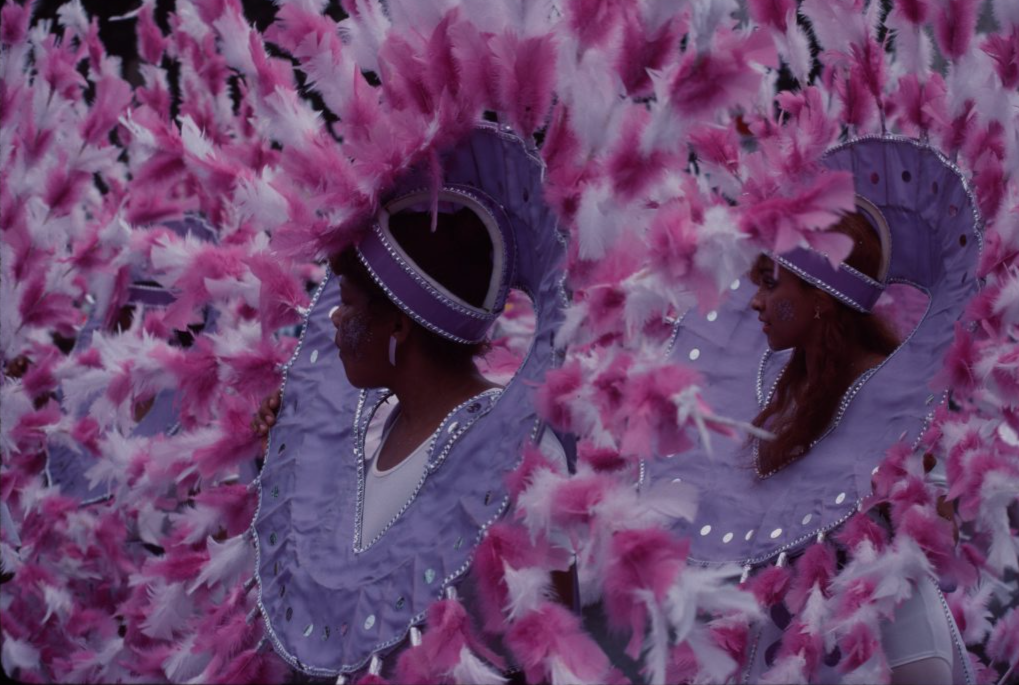
Costumed people in Caribana Parade, 1985. Provided by City of Toronto Archives, Fonds 200, Series 1465, File 722, Item 29.

The budget for Caribana this year increased to $450,000 this year. More than 300,000 people attended the 1985 Caribana Parade on August 3.

Like traffic in 1984, the Gardiner Expressway was backed up and some ramps were closed for hours. University Avenue was closed to cars throughout the parade and police rerouted cars away from the Caribana parade throughout the downtown core. Security was also enhanced at events this year as a result of the events that occurred 1984. Although, one officer was stabbed, and a stampede occurred during the final day of events on the Toronto islands.

Caribana's program for '85 included:

- July 20-August 2: College Park Gallery
- July 25, July 29–31, August 1: Moonlight Ferry Cruises
- July 26 and July 28: Carnival Costume Shows at George T. Bell Arena
- August 2: Miss Caribana Pageant & Dance at Royal York Hotel
- August 3: Carnival Parade & Dance (at Royal York)
- August 4–5: Picnic & Variety Show at Olympic Island

=== 1986 ===
During this year, the Caribbean Cultural Committee's annual general meeting was deemed as "an emotion-charged event and the stormiest in the festival's history". In this meeting, five new members were elected. Audience members also voiced their concerns of financial transparency and the poor treatment of band leaders, calypsonians and steelbands by Caribana's directors. Caribana organizers mentioned that this meeting had the largest turnout (200 people) and was "full of emotion".

In 1986, the Caribbean community in Hamilton hosted its debut Carnival, called the Cari-Can Festival. The festival took place from August 22–24 at Lincoln Alexander Community Centre. The festival included a weekend of activities as well as a dinner and dance. The parade was scheduled for the Saturday, where it would take place on the streets of downtown Hamilton.

Guy-Bana was also integrated into this years' festivities. Guy-Bana was a fusion of both Guyana and Caribana, which combined the calypso aspect of Caribana with sounds from Guyana's music soundscape. Guy-Bana took place on August 2 and featured artists such as Pamela Maynard and Reggie Paul.

Another festival that was integrated with Caribana in 1986 was Socafest, which ran from August 1–2. The festival and its proceeds helped to benefit The Canadian Sickle Cell Society.

The parade this year was expected to attract more than 300,000 people, coming from Canada, America, the Caribbean, as well as Europe.

== 1987–1992 ==
=== 1987 ===
By this year, it was estimated that Caribana generated more than $30 million in business for Toronto's economy. The budget for Caribana this year increased to $500,000, expected more than 250,000 spectators for the parade and 400,000 for the festival on a whole.

The festival's program included:

- July 25: Official Festival Launch and Show at Nathan Phillips Square
- July 25: Miss Caribana Pageant and Ball at Royal York Hotel
- July 25–26: Arts, Crafts and Trades Exhibition at St. Lawrence Market
- July 26: Caribana Junior Carnival at Varsity Arena
- July 27–31: Ferry Cruises
- July 30: King and Queen of the Bands Competition, presented by The Toronto Star at Varsity Arena
- July 31: Grand Carnival Ball at Ella's Ballroom
- August 1: Caribana Parade
- August 1: Grand Carnival Dance at St. Lawrence Market
- August 2–3: Olympic Island Picnic

An estimated 500 000 people attended the Caribana parade this year.

=== 1988 ===
Caribana 1988 emphasized more family and children activities. Gregory Regis, the chairman for Caribana, had mentioned that the festival wanted to take this approach as they believed in the importance of preserving Caribbean culture for the next generation. New additions included a craft market at St. Lawrence Market Lane, a series of mini concerts at College Park and an art exhibit at Metro Toronto Convention Centre that featured various artists from the Caribbean and Latin America. Caribana 1988 had seen an estimated 700,000 people, according to Joan Pierre, Caribana's executive director.

=== 1989 ===
In 1989, the parade route for the Caribana festival underwent another change. The parade was travelling backwards, where it was set to start at Wellington Street, move up to University Avenue and then end in the area surrounding Queen's Park, where it used to start. In 1989, it was reported that Caribana brings in an estimated $50 million annually to Toronto's economy.

The program for this year included events such as:

- August 4: Miss Caribana Pageant & Ball at Royal York Hotel
- August 4–7: Caribbean Jump Up at Harbourfront (free concert with Carl & Carol Jacobs, Kali & Dub Inc., The Officials, Soul Vibes, Las Chicas Del Caribe, Lazo and more)
- August 5: Parade
- August 5: Caribana Dance
- August 6–7: Caribana Family Picnic at Olympic Island
- August 6–7: Reggae Fest (with Dennis Brown, Freddy McGregor, Lloyd Parks, Lt. Stichie and We The People)

A key aspect of the 1989 Caribana Festival was its integrated focus on environmentalism. For the Caribana parade, Shadowland Theatre created a mas band that was an artistic representation of tropical deforestation. The King of the Mas wore 18 ft wings, a bustle and a totem pole, while the Queen wore a 10 ft circle representing the growth patterns of a tree. The band also included 40 trees, a forest floor, a willow tree and tree spirits.

=== 1990 ===
For this years' festival, a concert was added to the schedule, where it was scheduled to take place at Skydome. Performers included Regina Belle, Kool Moe Dee, Maestro Fresh Wes, Ice T, Frankie Paul and Charlie's Roots. The goal of the concert was to celebrate all forms of Black music - rap, reggae, r&b and calypso. Unfortunately, the concert was cancelled due to poor ticket sales. Only 2000 seats out of the 30000 seats available were sold. This cancellation created a huge deficit for Caribana and its organizers.

The Miss Caribana Pageant was removed from the programming this year as it had received criticism from feminist groups, arguing that the event "isn't cultural" and gives a negative image to Caribana".

The festival was still a success as an estimated 750,000 to 1 million people attended the Caribana parade this year. Because of the increase in spectators this year, organizers began to question if a new route should be created as Caribana had essentially outgrown University Avenue. Suggestions included moving the parade to Exhibition Place. By the end of the year, the Caribbean Cultural Committee began to start negotiations to move the parade to Exhibition Place along with a new entrance fee to be charged for part of the route.

=== 1991 ===
Early in the year, the proposal to move the Caribana parade to Exhibition Place was still under consideration. The proposal was approved by May 1991, but there was no entrance fee charged for the parade. The only fee that was implemented was for sitting inside the Exhibition stadium to watch the judging of mas bands. The new parade route would move through the stadium, west down Lake Shore Blvd. West and end at Parkside Drive.

After the controversy surrounding the Royal Ontario Museum and the Into The Heart of Africa exhibition, the museum created Caribbean Celebrations to help make amends with the Toronto Black community. The exhibition included two segments; one was a Caribbean costume exhibition curated with the help of the Saint Louis Art Museum. The other segment was an exhibition of costumes and masks from Toronto's Caribana festival, curated by the ROM. The event ran from June 6 - September 3, and included a variety of presentations, films and lectures, where ROM had consulted with Toronto's African and Caribbean communities.

The administration of Caribana had undergone changes before the festival season. During March 1991, a whole new board for Caribana was elected due to accusations of financial mismanagement. The meeting lasted five hours and a new board interim chairperson and interim treasurer were re-elected, along with new accountants were added to the board as well. The deficit for Caribana was now $562 000.

The provincial government awarded Caribana a grant of $62,000, which had been announced at the festival's opening ceremony at Nathan Phillips Square.

The Caribbean Cultural Committee was also able to receive more than $500,000 from corporate sources while also securing sponsorships. Teleglobe Canada spent $300,000 to co-sponsor the festival with the Caribbean Cultural Committee. Ontario Lottery Corporation pledged $100,000 and assisted in lending a mobile stage along with a sound system and staff members. Mac's Convenience Store contributed $75,000, Molson Breweries contributed $25 000 and Coca-Cola was another sponsor.

Police estimated that 1.2 million people were at the '91 Caribana parade. As a result of a successful festival season, the committee was able to reduce its debt to $300,000.

By 1991, it was estimated that Caribana brings in about $35 million into Toronto's economy throughout the festival.

Teleglobe had pulled its sponsorship in October 1991. Teleglobe representatives had expressed that they were unhappy with the little exposure they received from the festival, despite being Caribana's biggest sponsor. Teleglobe also refused to pay the final $75,000 as part of the $300,000 from the sponsorship. The remaining deficit as well as the loss of the Teleglobe sponsorship resulted in the committee being unable to pay prizes to the winning bands as well as the Caribana King and Queen from the '91 festival.

=== 1992 ===
The Caribbean Cultural Committee held a Caribana photo exhibition at their new art gallery in College Park. The photos in the exhibition were taken by Pierre St. Laurent and captured on film. The exhibit contained 25 photos that captured the beauty playing mas and costumes in Caribana.

For the '92 festival, the committee was depending on new food and merchandise vendors to help make up for money lost from the Teleglobe sponsorship during '91. The sponsors for this year included the Ontario Lottery Corporation, Molson Breweries, Mac's Convenience, Coca-Cola as well as Western Union.

By July 1992, the committee had paid off all the money and prizes that they owed winners from the previous year. Also, the City of Toronto agreed to dismiss over $100,000 worth of debt that the committee owed.

1.5 million people attended the parade for the '92 Caribana festival. However, two shootings and one stabbing occurred in the evening of the parade. As a result, events were shut down for the rest of the night.

This year, city officials began to realize how vital Caribana is as it continued to bring in millions of dollars towards Toronto's economy every festival season. This year, Caribana brought in an estimated $250 million into Toronto.

== See also ==
- Caribana
- Caribbean Carnival
- History of Toronto
