= Sylford Walker =

Jamaican reggae singer (born c. 1955)

- Born: c. 1955; Penlyne Castle, St. Thomas, Jamaica
- Genre: Reggae
- Years active: 1975–present
- Labels: South East Music, Joe Gibbs Music, Greensleeves, Shanachie Blood and Fire (record label)

Sylford Walker (born c. 1955) is a Jamaican reggae singer who first recorded in the mid-1970s and, with reissues renewing interest in him, returned to recording and performing in the 21st century. Since year 2025, he with his cousin Rachaad Amjarii collaborates with french Soundation Sound System, operated by selecta Mackafyah. Early 2025, Sylford Walker releases a new LP entitled Good Encouragement featuring 20 tracks on two records, on the label Sunvibes Music.

== Biography ==
Born in Penlyne Castle, St. Thomas, Walker relocated to Kingston at the age of nine. Walker began working with producer Glen Brown, although his first releases were recorded for Joe Gibbs in 1975, including the singles "Burn Babylon" and "Jah Golden Pen" (written in 1974 while serving a prison sentence for possession of marijuana), Walker drawing comparisons with Burning Spear. His most productive period was working with Brown in the mid-late 1970s, singles from the era including "Lamb's Bread" and "Eternal Day". His debut album, Lamb's Bread, produced by Brown and mixed by King Tubby, was recorded in 1978, but not released until Greensleeves Records and Shanachie Records issued it ten years later. In The Rough Guide to Reggae, Steve Barrow and Peter Dalton describe the tracks on the album as "minor masterpieces". The album's tracks were reissued in 2000 on the critically acclaimed Blood & Fire release Lamb's Bread International, which also included Welton Irie's deejay versions on the same rhythm tracks. Increased interest in Walker's work saw the release of the Nutin Na Gwan album in 2006, which included new recordings produced by Joe Gibbs, and a string of reissue singles in the first decade of the 21st century. Walker returned to live performance, including a few European tours in 2000's with the Swiss selecter/producer Asher Selector and later in 2013 with RDBLCK Artist Agency. From 2025, Sylford Walker and Idrens are working remotely with selecta Macka Fyah, based in Paris, France.

== Discography ==
=== Albums ===
- Lamb's Bread (1988), Greensleeves/Shanachie

Compilations

- Lamb's Bread International (2000), Blood & Fire – with Welton Irie
- Nutin Na Gwan (2006), Joe Gibbs
- The Best of Sylford Walker (2009), Walk Yah Walk

=== Singles ===
- "Burn Babylon" (1975), Belmont/Joe Gibbs Music
- "Jah Golden Pen" (1975), Joe Gibbs Music
- "Eternal Day" – b-side of God Sons "South East Trumpet" (1975), South East Music – 10-inch single
- "Assack Lawn" (197?), South East Music
- "God Love" (1977), Sir Clough
- "Lambs Bread" (1978), Pantomime
- "I Can't Understand" (1976), EBT
- "Mother in Law" (197?), Joe Gibbs
- "Chant Down Babylon" (197?), Stars
- "Africa" – b-side of Glen Brown – "Marcus Garvey Words" (1979), Kingley Sounds – 12-inch single
- "Cleanliness Is Godliness" (1979), South East Music
- "Lambs Bread" (1979), South East Music
- "Book of the Old Testament" (1979), Art & Craft
- "Deuteronomy" (1979), South East Music
- "Our Father Home Land" (1979), South East Music
- "I Love You" (1979), Art & Craft – with Jah Stitch
- "Deuteronomy" (2002), Glimmer – 10-inch single
- "Chant Down Babylon" (2008), South East Music
- "United" (2010), Charlie's
