= VP Music Group =

- Founder: Randy Chin; Miss Pat
- Distributor: ADA
- Genre: Reggae; dancehall; soca; afrobeats
- Location: New York City; Miami; London; Kingston; Tokyo; Rio de Janeiro; Johannesburg
- Official website: www.vprecords.com

VP Music Group is a US-based record company that owns and distributes four labels: VP Records, Greensleeves Records, Dub Rockers and 17 North Parade. The company's origins stem from the Randy's Records record shop, which opened in 1958 on the corner of East and Tower streets in Kingston. Also under the music group is a distribution branch named VPAL. The company has offices in New York City, Miami, Kingston, London, Tokyo, Rio de Janeiro and Johannesburg.
