= Johnny Ringo (musician) =

Jamaican reggae deejay

- Born: Bradley Miller
- Origin: Kingston, Jamaica
- Genres: Reggae
- Instrument: Vocals

Johnny Ringo (born Bradley Miller; 1961 – 1 July 2005) was a reggae/dancehall deejay active from the late 1970s to the early 1990s.

== Biography ==
Ringo was born in Jones Town, Kingston, Jamaica. He worked in a Kingston record shop, where he met Welton Irie, the two enjoying a long association since. He worked as an operator on the Soul Express and Rippa-Tone sound systems, before being given the chance to record in the late 1970s, and releasing his first single with "Trouble Never Set Like Rain". His recordings became popular in Jamaica, with slack lyrics proving particularly popular. Two notable examples are "Two Lesbians" and "Push Lady Push". In 1982, he had an international reggae hit with "Dub and Lef", which was followed by further Jamaican hits with tracks such as "Pain a Back", "Nah Fight Over Woman", and "Married for the Opportunity". He also contributed the opening track to the album Superstar Yellowman Has Arrived With Toyan in 1982. He continued to work on sound systems, Lees Unlimited and Ray Symbolic's Hi Fi, the latter touring internationally with Ringo, Squiddly Ranking, and Welton Irie. He contributed to some of the early live dancehall albums in 1983 and 1984. While touring the UK, he recorded a brace of singles for Fashion Records, and recorded with Sugar Minott. He continued to record until the early 1990s, sometimes credited simply as Ringo.

He died in Kingston at 44 years old in July 2005, after suffering for some time from cocaine addiction.

== Discography ==
=== Albums ===
- Sweet Christmas (197?) Top Ranking (Dobby Dobson featuring Ringo)
- Two Coxman (1981) Ariola
- Woman a Ginal (1981) Top Ranking
- Riding West (1982) VP/Jah Guidance
- Johnny Ringo (1982) Abissa
- Cool Profile (1982) Musical Ambassador
- Eyewitness (1982) MC
- Pancoot (1982) Hitbound
- Cool Profile (1984) Negus Roots
- JA to UK MC Clash (1985) Fashion (Johnny Ringo meets Asher Senator)
- Face to Face (200?) JA Classics (with Louie Lepkie)
- Dancehall Legend (2007) Musical Ambassador

=== Compilations, guest appearances, etc. ===
- Green Bay Killing (1978) Pantomime, features "Green Bay Killing"
- Vintage Classics (197?) Rohit, features "Rub-A-Dub"
- Roots Reggae Party Vol 1 (1981) Silver Camel, features "Living For Tomorrow - Keycard Moves"
- Roots Reggae Party Vol 2 (1982) Silver Camel, features "Tense Me Tense - Suspended Sentence"
- Superstar Yellowman Has Arrived With Toyan (1982) Joe Gibbs, features "I Am Getting Married"
- Junjo Presents A Live Session With Aces International (1982) Greensleeves, features "Ringo"
- DJ Connection (1982) Circle, features "DJ Connection"
- Junjo Presents Two Big Sound - Live (1983) Greensleeves
- King Stur-Gav Hi Fi Lee Unlimited (1983) Live & Learn, features "Special Request"
- George Phang & Friends At Skateland Live (1984) Power House
- Black & White Reggae Classics Vol 1 (198?) Black & White, features "One Time Ringo", "Push Lady Push"
- Johnny Osbourne - Nightfall Showcase (1997) Munich, features "Qua She Take Over"
- Total Recall Vol 10 (1998) VP, features "One Time Ringo"
- When The Dances Were Changing (1998) Pressure Sounds, features "Working Class", "Working Class (Version)"
- A Dee-Jay Explosion (200?) Heartbeat, features "Push Lady Push"
- DJ's Of The 70s Creole, features "Love Me Country", "Sure Time", "Plaid Shirt", "Calypso Fi Granny"
- Dynamite Series #3 Tabou, features "Johnny Ringo"
