= Doublecheck Your Head =

Remix album by Max Tannone
- Released: September 1, 2009
- Genre: Hip hop Experimental; Punk
- Length: 23:54
- Label: Self-released
- Producer: Max Tannone

Doublecheck Your Head is a mashup album of songs from the 1992 album Check Your Head by the Beastie Boys that was mixed and produced by New York producer Max Tannone. The album was released to download on September 1, 2009.

== Production ==
The concept behind the album Doublecheck Your Head was to mash the Beastie Boys' with themselves, where songs off the album Check Your Head have both instrumentals and rap songs. This is reflected in the remix album title, Doublecheck Your Head, which is the mash-up of just that. Some of the tracks have undergone comprehensive re-arrangement, while others were mashed fairly straightforwardly. The first six songs on the album are mashups; the last is a remix of a song off the then upcoming album Hot Sauce Committee, Pt. 1. It was released to download for free from the official website on September 1, 2009, and an unofficial vinyl album has been subsequently released.

According to Tannone, Doublecheck Your Head was released in September 2009 in order to coincide with the reissue of Check Your Head, which occurred roughly around the same time.

== Reception ==
Doublecheck Your Head has received generally positive reviews, and it has been called a "solid hip hop mashup". Fans felt that the remix gave them the feeling of déjà vu, but still maintained to sound new.

Four of the songs were featured on the official Beastie Boys' website.

== Tracks ==
| No. | Title | Music | Vocal track | Length |
|---|---|---|---|---|
| 1. | "3's What'cha Want" | "In 3's" | "So What'cha Want" | 3:36 |
| 2. | "Pass the Gratitude" | "Gratitude" | "Pass the Mic" | 3:19 |
| 3. | "Booty Groove" | Groove Holmes | "Professor Booty" | 3:16 |
| 4. | "Jimmy Namasté" | Namasté | "Jimmy James" | 2:51 |
| 5. | "Maestro's Got to Give" | Something's Got to Give | "The Maestro" | 3:08 |
| 6. | "Skills To Lighten Up" | "Lighten Up", "Finger Lickin' Good", "Live at P.J.'s", "Stand Together" | "The Skills To Pay The Bills" | 3:38 |
| 7. | "Too Many Rappers (Max Tannone remix)" (single, 2009) | | | 4:06 |
