= Songbook (disambiguation) =

A song book, or songbook, is a book containing lyrics and notes for songs.

Songbook may also refer to:

== Albums ==
- Songbook (Angela Aki album), 2012
- Songbook (Benny Carter album), 1996
- Songbook (Goran Bregović album), 2000
- Songbook (Chris Cornell album), 2011
- Songbook (Gordon Lightfoot album), 1999
- Songbook (Mark Murphy album), 1999
- Songbook (Katie Noonan album), 2013
- Songbook (Kenny Garrett album), 1997
- Songbook (The Nudie Suits album), 2003
- Songbook (Robbie Williams album), 2009
- Songbook (Woodpigeon album), 2006
- Songbook: The Singles, Vol. 1, by Super Furry Animals
- (Songbook) A Collection of Hits, by Trisha Yearwood
- Songbook, a 2009 album by Family of the Year
- Song Book, an album by Burl Ives
- Songbook #1, an album by The Vicar (music producer)

== Other media ==
- Songbook (Nick Hornby book) (UK title: 31 Songs), a 2002 collection of essays
- Songbook (musical), a 1979 musical by Monty Norman and Julian Moore, also known as The Moony Shapiro Songbook
- Song Books (Cage), a collection of short works by John Cage

== See also ==
- Bob Andy's Song Book, an album
- Rattlesnake Guitar: The Music of Peter Green, reissued as Peter Green Songbook, a Peter Green tribute album -->
