= Welton Irie =

- Born: Welton Dobson
- Origin: Jamaica
- Genres: Reggae
- Instrument: Vocals

Welton Irie (born Welton Dobson; 1961 in Jamaica), sometimes credited simply as Welton, is a Jamaican reggae deejay, best known for his work in the late 1970s and early 1980s.

== Biography ==
Welton Irie began his career performing as simply 'Welton' on the Sir John the President and Big John's Stereophonic Sound sound systems (the latter later known as Echo Tone Hi Fi), in 1976, initially heavily influenced by Ranking Trevor. After building up a sizeable following, he was able to introduce young talent such as General Echo to the sound system. Welton moved on to the Gemini and Virgo sound systems and began a partnership with Lone Ranger, the two beginning their recording careers together as a duo for Studio One, in a similar vein to Michigan & Smiley with tracks such as "Chase Them Crazy". On Studio One boss Coxsone Dodd's recommendation, he extended his stage name to Welton Irie. The pair's partnership was short-lived with both going on to solo careers. Solo hits soon came with "The Bomb", "Army Life", the Jamaican number one hit "Ballerina" recorded with Sly & Robbie, and "Lambs Bread International".

His debut album, Ghettoman Corner, was recorded for producer Glen Brown and was based on rhythms from Sylford Walker's Lamb's Bread album. Walker's album was re-released with the inclusion of six of Irie's deejay versions as Lamb's Bread International by Blood & Fire in 2000.

In the early 1980s he worked with Henry "Junjo" Lawes' Volcano sound system, and in 1983 returned to Gemini, touring internationally with Johnny Ringo and Squiddly Ranking. In the mid-1980s, with the prevalent style of reggae changing, Irie stopped deejaying and worked as a selector for Gemini. He revived his career in the mid-2000s and began performing live once again.

== Albums ==
- Ghetto Man Corner (1977) Pantomime
- It Feels So Good (1980) Joe Gibbs
- Reprobate (1982) Hitbound
- Army Life (1982) Dynamite
- New Style (1982) Pioneer International
- Sweetest Ever (1983) Rohit
- One & One = Two (1995) Jamaican Authentic Classics (with General Plough)
- Lamb's Bread International (2000) Blood & Fire (with Sylford Walker)
- Live@Chez Heinz, Hannover/April 2007 (2007)

== Appearances on live albums ==
- Junjo Presents Aces International (1982) Greensleeves
- A Dee Jay Explosion Inna Dance Hall Style (1982) Heartbeat
