= Book of Songs =

Book of Songs may refer to:

- Classic of Poetry, sometimes referred to as Book of Songs, an anthology of ancient Chinese poetry
- Kitab al-Aghani, a collection of poems and songs by 10th-century Arab scholar Abu al-Faraj al-Isfahani
- Buch der Lieder, a collection of poems written by 19th-century German poet and writer Heinrich Heine
- Book of Songs, a 2017 album by Sophie Koh

== See also ==
- Book of Psalms, a book in the Hebrew Bible and Old Testament
- Book of Song, a historical text of the Liu Song Dynasty of the Southern Dynasties of China
- History of Song (book)
- Songbook (disambiguation)
