= Jaydiohead =

Remix album by Minty Fresh Beats
- Released: 1 January 2009; The Encore – 12 July 2009
- Label: Self-released
- Producer: Minty Fresh Beats

Jaydiohead: The Encore

Jaydiohead is the mashup project of the music of Jay-Z and Radiohead that was mixed and produced by New York producer Minty Fresh Beats (Max Tannone). Tannone premiered the album Jaydiohead on his Myspace page on 30 December 2008, which was officially released to download 1 January 2009. The first album was followed by the 12 July 2009 release of Jaydiohead: The Encore, which featured five new mixes. The album Jaydiohead has been called an internet sensation.

== Production ==
Tannone began work on Jaydiohead about a year prior to the album's completion, beginning with the tracks "Wrong Prayer" and "Ignorant Swan". The remainder of the tracks, which incorporate Jay-Z's a capella releases and samples from Radiohead songs, were mixed and produced beginning in August 2008. Over the course of six weeks, Tannone had completed the album from his laptop. In an interview with The Daily Beast writer Touré, he explained that producing a song is a lengthy process that could take several weeks to complete. Using Jay-Z's a cappella songs as the master tempo, he searched through Radiohead songs that he believed would complement Jay's lyrics. He also stated that cohesion between the songs was one of the most difficult tasks in mixing. But by splitting up Radiohead songs into smaller pieces, he was able to layer Jay-Z's vocal tracks on top of them, sometimes placing additional melodies, adding drums or percussive instrumentation, or other effects into the track. Due to copyright infringement issues, similar to the release of most mashups, the songs were offered free of charge from the official website, and no legal action has been taken against Tannone. Jaydiohead was also bootlegged on vinyl.

In addition, a video called "Ignorant Swan Medley" was made, and featured several clips from songs on the album.

=== Style ===
The distinct sound of Jay-Z's vocal tracks with Radiohead's samples by Tannone have been described as fluid, uniting the sounds of two legendary artists and complementing one with the other. This fusion of the two artists has been described as not sounding forced, coming from artists with music that is considered to be polar opposites of each other. The songs' cohesion gives the impression that the two distinctly different genres have not been merged, but could pass as an original release by either one of the original artists. Aside from Radiohead and Jay-Z samples being alternative rock and hip hop respectively, the music has been described as funky.

== Reception ==
Professional ratings
Review scores
Source	Rating
Sputnikmusic (Jaydiohead)	4/5
Sputnikmusic (Jaydiohead: The Encore)	2/5

Overall, most critics viewed the album generally as positive, and David James Young of Sputnik praised that "Jaydiohead throughout the album bring(s) out sides of both artists in a subtle yet highly effective way." Also, fans of both respective artists typically received the album well, as did fellow mashup DJs. Several critics have compared Jaydiohead to Danger Mouse's Grey Album, also a mashup album, which features samples taken from the Beatles' The White Album and Jay-Z's The Black Album. Others have mentioned the similarity between Jaydiohead with that of Girl Talk's track "Set It Off", which mixes Jay's "Roc Boys (And the Winner Is)..." with Radiohead's "Paranoid Android", albeit for a very short amount of time in comparison with the full album Tannone has made. It even garnered attention by Jay-Z himself, hailing several of the tracks as "gems" in one of his own Twitter posts. Notable celebrities that have mentioned the album, or a particular song, include Gwyneth Paltrow on her blog and Carson Daly on his TV show Last Call with Carson Daly, as well as a few others that it caught the attention of. It has made several "Top of 2009" lists, and the video for "Ignorant Swan Melody" was a Vimeo feature staff pick. In 2010, Jaydiohead was included in a piece by NPR entitled The Mechanics of Mashups.

However, not all reviews were positive. Vice magazine called the album "supremely lame and tame", and some have joked that the track names leave little room for surprise.

Although both have performed, but not appeared in the same year at the Glastonbury Festival, critics have also played with the idea that this shared attribute would spark a "Collision Course" and subsequent tour.

== Tracks ==
No.	Title	Music	Vocal sample	Length
1.	"Wrong Prayer"	"I Might Be Wrong" (from Amnesiac, 2001)	"Pray" (from American Gangster, 2007)	3:46
2.	"99 Anthems"	"The National Anthem" (from Kid A, 2000)	"99 Problems" (from The Black Album, 2003)	4:07
3.	"No Karma"	"Karma Police" (from OK Computer, 1997)	"No Hook" (from American Gangster, 2007)	3:34
4.	"Lucifer's Jigsaw"	"Jigsaw Falling into Place" (from In Rainbows, 2007)	"Lucifer" (from The Black Album, 2003)	3:25
5.	"Optimistic Moment"	"Optimistic" (from Kid A, 2000)	"Moment of Clarity" (from The Black Album, 2003)	4:53
6.	"Dirt Off Your Android"	"Paranoid Android" (from OK Computer, 1997)	"Dirt off Your Shoulder" (from The Black Album, 2003)	3:51
7.	"Dreaming Up"	"Up on the Ladder" (from In Rainbows (bonus disc), 2007)	"American Dreamin'" (from American Gangster, 2007)	3:33
8.	"Change Order"	"Gagging Order" (from Go to Sleep B-side, 2003)	"Never Change" (from The Blueprint, 2001)	3:52
9.	"Fall in Step"	"15 Step" (from In Rainbows, 2007)	"Fallin'" (from American Gangster, 2007)	4:05
10.	"Ignorant Swan"	"Black Swan" (from The Eraser, 2006)	"Ignorant Shit" (from American Gangster, 2007)	3:36

The Encore
No.	Title	Music	Vocal sample	Length
1.	"Air Roc"	"Airbag" (from OK Computer, 1997)	"Roc Boys (And the Winner Is)..." (from American Gangster, 2007)	4:25
2.	"Life There"	"There There" (from Hail to the Thief, 2003)	"Party Life" (from American Gangster, 2007)	3:32
3.	"Reckoner's Encore"	"Reckoner" (from In Rainbows, 2007)	"Encore" (from The Black Album, 2003)	3:48
4.	"Song and Cry"	"High and Dry" (from The Bends, 1995)	"Song Cry" (from The Blueprint, 2001)	4:44
5.	"December Backdrifts"	"Backdrifts" (from Hail to the Thief, 2003)	"December 4th" (from The Black Album, 2003)	4:10
