= Truths and Rights =

Studio album by Johnny Osbourne
- Released: 1980
- Recorded: 1979
- Genre: Roots reggae
- Label: Studio One
- Producer: Clement Dodd

Johnny Osbourne chronology
Come Back Darling (1970)	Truths and Rights (1980)	Fally Lover (1981)

Professional ratings
Review scores
Source	Rating
Allmusic	5/5 stars

Truths and Rights is a 1980 reggae album by Johnny Osbourne.

== Recording ==
Truths and Rights is Johnny Osbourne's second studio album. It was recorded in 1979 after his return to Jamaica from Canada, and first released in 1980 on the Studio One label. The album was preceded by three singles on Studio One, "Jealousy, Heartache and Pain", "Forgive Them", and "Love is Here to Stay", none of which were included on the original release of the album, although "Jealousy, Heartache and Pain" was included on the expanded CD reissue on Heartbeat Records in 2008 (it had earlier been released by Heartbeat with the original track listing). This was the sole album Osbourne recorded for Studio One, and like Sugar Minott's groundbreaking Live Loving album from two years earlier, this featured new lyrics written over vintage Studio One rhythms, including The Soul Vendors "Swing Easy" (on "Can't Buy Love"), Al Campbell's "Take a Ride" (on "Truths and Rights"), and Otis Gale's "I'll Be Around" ("We Need Love").

== Track listing ==
=== Original release ===
1. "Truths and Rights" – 3:01
2. "Children Are Crying" – 3:36
3. "Can't Buy Love" – 2:18
4. "Jah Promise" – 3:56
5. "Nah Skin Up" – 2:56
6. "We Need Love – 3:42
7. "Eternal Peace" – 2:52
8. "Sing Jah Stylee" – 2:54
9. "Love Jah So" – 2:20
10. "Let Me In" – 2:53

=== Bonus tracks on 2008 reissue ===
1. "Jealousy Heartache And Pain"
2. "Dub Specialist"
3. "West Gone Black"
4. "Truths And Rights"
5. "Sing Jay Stylee"
6. "Can't Buy Love/Swing Easy"
