= Tony McDermott =

English graphic designer (born 20th century)

Tony McDermott is an English graphic designer, known for his artwork for Greensleeves Records.

== Early life and education ==
McDermott grew up in Oldham, Greater Manchester, England. He developed an interest in comic books and drawing during his childhood, and in 1978 moved to London to study graphic design at the London College of Printing.

== Career ==
He contributed a comic titled 'Shades' to Black Echoes magazine, which the owners of Greensleeves Records saw and asked him to illustrate some of their releases. These included albums by Scientist, Mad Professor, Johnny Osbourne, and Yellowman. While many initial covers featured cartoon illustrations designed by McDermott, he later moved away from this style to incorporate photographs or other graphic styles. His work was credited as establishing the labels visual image and identity.

In 2010, a book featuring the first 100 Greensleeves covers was released. It primarily featured McDermott's work.
