= The Swinging Stars =

The Swingin' Stars were an early popular band from Dominica, formed in 1959 in the Virgin Lane/Turkey Lane area. They were originally known as the Swinging Teens and changed their name in 1961. Their first major show was at the 1960 calypso competition at Carnival, and they continued to gain fans across the Caribbean in the early 1960s; their first show outside Dominica came in 1964. They recorded in Barbados in 1967, releasing "Sparrow Party" backed by "Tom Cat Mambo".

The Swinging Stars are the second longest living calypso music band in the Caribbean. They have continued performing and recording to the present, and have released at least eleven albums.
