= Max Tannone =

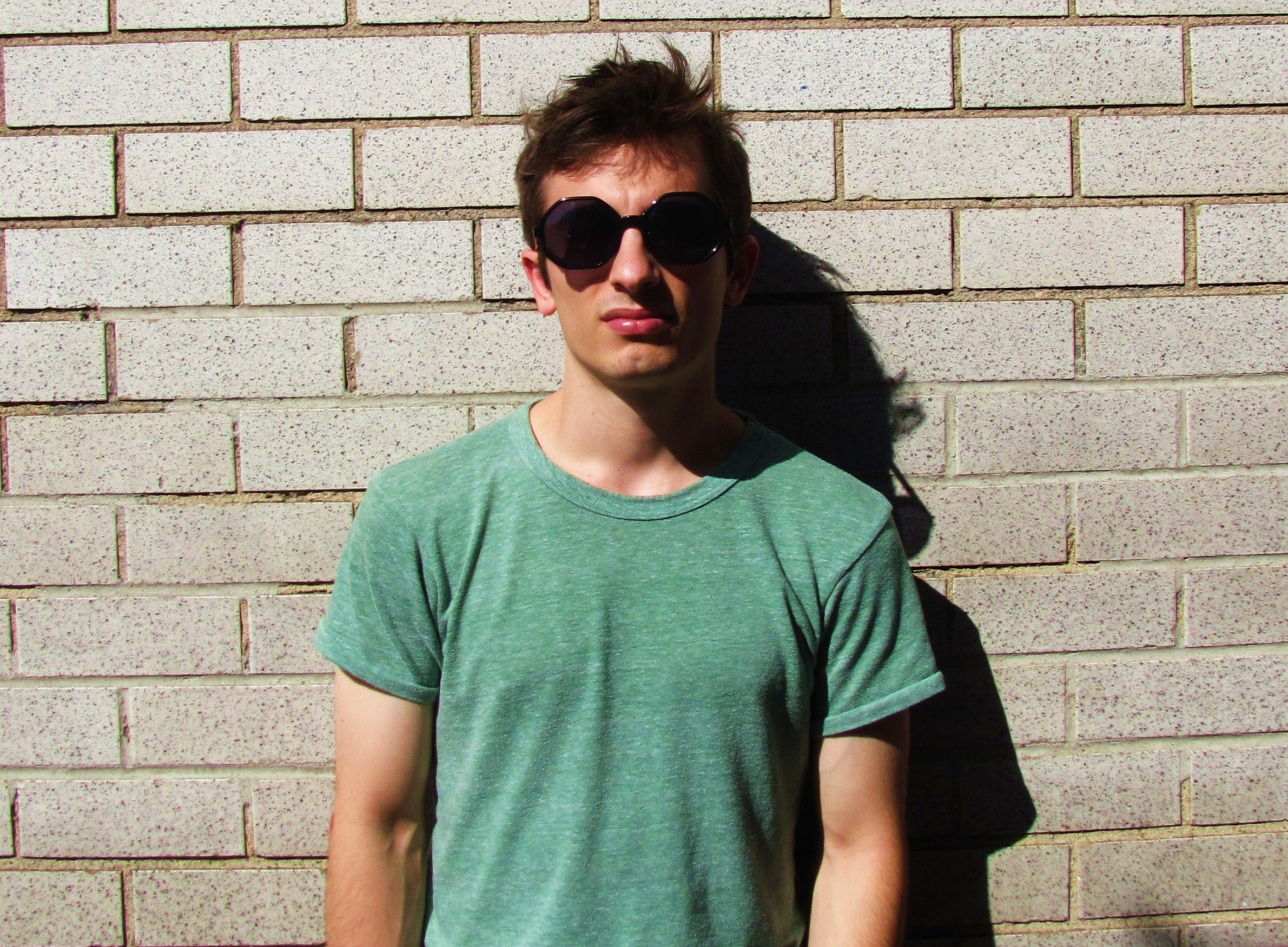

Background information
- Also known as: Minty Fresh Beats
- Origin: New York City, New York, U.S.
- Genres: Mashup, experimental, hip hop
- Occupation: Musician
- Instrument: Laptop
- Years active: 2009–present
- Website: Official website

Max Tannone, formerly known as Minty Fresh Beats, is a New York music producer most notable for his production of mashup music.

== Early life and career ==
Born in Manhattan, Tannone lived in Upstate New York for most of his life, until he moved back to New York City in 2008. He began making beats and remixes with FL Studio (formerly Fruity Loops) at age 16. Currently, he uses FL Studio, Acid Pro, and Adobe Audition. Some of Tannone's musical influences include the Beastie Boys, DJ Premier, Beck, and King Tubby. Later on, he listed artists such as A Tribe Called Quest, Black Star and the Roots as the groups that most influenced him.

In December 2008, Tannone digitally released Jaydiohead, a mash-up album combining Jay-Z and Radiohead. Jaydiohead was Tannone's first full-length mash-up project. Five additional Jaydiohead tracks were released in July 2009, on Jaydiohead: The Encore. In September 2009, Tannone digitally released Doublecheck Your Head, which mixed Beastie Boys vocals over instrumental tracks the band recorded for their Check Your Head disc. Tannone's third mash-up project, Mos Dub was digitally released in April 2010. Tannone is briefly featured in the Jaydiohead "Ignorant Swan Medley" music video.

Tannone has described his creative process as finding "an acapella and a song I want to sample. Next I chop up the original song into short pieces so I can re-arrange it, and from here I build the track around the vocals. Once the skeleton is completed, I began adding drums, FX, other instruments, edit the vocals, etc. Really just making it as you go."

== Discography ==
- Jaydiohead (2009)
  - Jaydiohead: The Encore (2009)
- Doublecheck Your Head (2009)
- Mos Dub (2010)
- Dub Kweli (2010)
- Selene (2011)
- Ghostfunk (2011)
- Mic Check 1234! (2012)
- Champagne Jerry − For Real, You Guys (2013)
- Champagne Jerry − The Champagne Room (2016)
- Champagne Jerry − I've Grown (2018)
- Trading WAV Sound System (2020)
- NNNNYYYY (2021)
