= Bob Andy's Song Book =

Compilation album by Bob Andy
- Released: 1970
- Recorded: Studio One, Kingston, Jamaica, 1966-1968
- Genres: Ska, rocksteady, reggae
- Label: Studio One/Coxsone
- Producer: Clement "Coxsone" Dodd

Bob Andy chronology
Bob Andy's Song Book (1970)	Sweet Memories (1976)

1997 CD cover
- Cover from the 1997 CD release.

Professional ratings
Review scores
Source	Rating
Tom Hull – on the Web	A−

Bob Andy's Song Book is a 1970 album of songs by Jamaican reggae singer and songwriter Bob Andy, recorded between 1966 and 1968. Andy had first found fame as the lead vocalist of The Paragons, but his peak as a solo artist came in the late '60s when he recorded a string of singles for Clement "Coxsone" Dodd's Studio One label. In 1970, these singles were compiled on the Song Book album. Many of the songs on the album have since been covered by a range of artists, including Taj Mahal, who covered "Desperate Lover" on his 1974 Mo' Roots album. Vocal harmony on three tracks on the album are performed by Bunny Wailer and Peter Tosh of The Wailers, and backing comes from Studio One band the Soul Vendors, whose members included Jackie Mittoo and Roland Alphonso. The album was re-issued on CD in 1997, with extended versions of "Desperate Lover" and "Feeling Soul". In the Rough Guides book Reggae: 100 Essential CDs, the album is described as "a masterpiece that belongs in anyone's CD collection - and not just of reggae music", and it has also been described as "one of the era's classic albums".

== Track listing ==
1. "My Time"
2. "Desperate Lover"
3. "Life Could Be A Symphony"
4. "Too Experienced"
5. "I've Got To Go Back Home"
6. "I Would Be A Fool"
7. "Going Home"
8. "Stay In My Lonely Arms"
9. "Let Them Say"
10. "Unchained"
11. "Feeling Soul"
12. "Crime Don't Pay"
