= Michael Prophet =

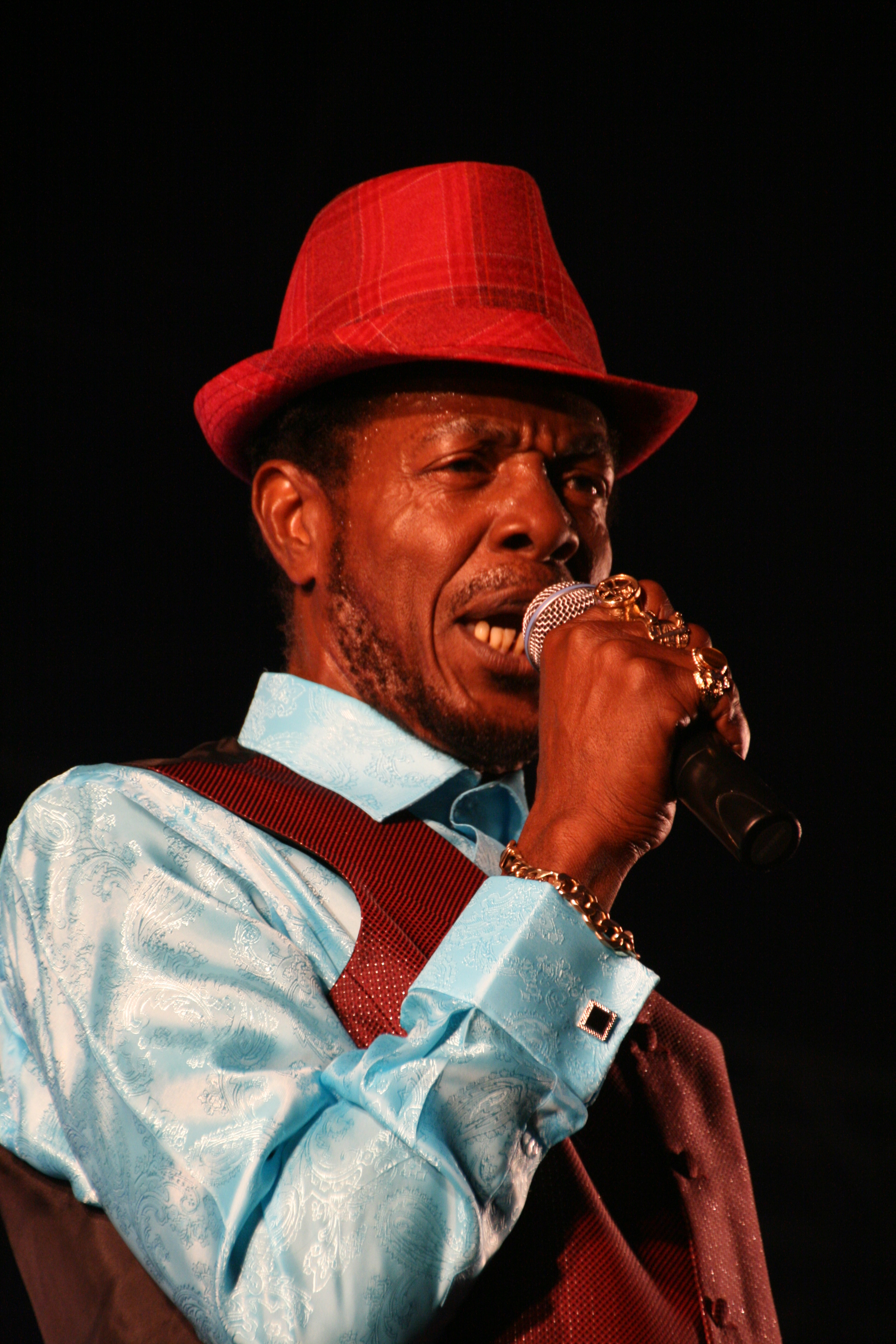
- Prophet in 2014

Background information
- Born: Michael George Haynes; 3 March 1957; Kingston, Jamaica
- Died: 16 December 2017 (aged 60) Bedford, England
- Genre: Reggae
- Occupation: Singer
- Website: Official Instagram

Michael George Haynes (3 March 1957 – 16 December 2017), known professionally as Michael Prophet, was a Jamaican roots reggae singer known for his "crying" tenor vocal style, whose recording career began in 1977. Prophet was one of Jamaica’s most popular roots reggae singers and had several prominent hits during his 40-year career.

== Biography ==
Michael George Haynes was born in Kingston, Jamaica, on 3 March 1957, the only child of Caroline Smith, a housewife, and Lloyd Haynes, a painter and decorator who worked for the beverage company Desnoes & Geddes (Lloyd fathered 13 other children). Educated at Greenwich Farm High School, Kingston, he lived nearby with his paternal grandmother Gladys, a market trader. The impoverished Greenwich Farm district had long been a hotbed of musical activity, and during the late 1970s Michael Haynes began singing on local sound systems. In 1978 he recorded his first singles, "The Woman I Love", "Super Star" and "True Born African", but they made little impact.

Haynes then formed a vocal trio with friends from the neighbourhood, but when they auditioned for the producer Yabby You, Jackson convinced him to ditch the other vocalists, renamed him Michael Prophet and shifted the focus of his lyrics to Rastafari philosophy and the harshness of ghetto life. Prophet's first release with Jackson, a remake of The Heptones' "Fight It To The Top", was a strong seller, as were the originals "Praise You Jah Jah" and "Love and Unity". Their popularity led to an acclaimed debut album, Serious Reasoning, released beyond Jamaica by Island Records in 1979.

In 1980 Prophet joined forces with the rising ghetto producer Henry "Junjo" Lawes and released the autobiographical "Gunman", about an armed robbery that took place at the singer's home. A reggae adaptation of "Here Comes the Bride" was also a big hit.

The widespread popularity of this material, and the Lawes-produced albums Righteous are the Conqueror and Michael Prophet, led to Prophet travelling frequently to London during the mid-1980s. He then brought out the self-produced albums Love is an Earthly Thing and Blood Stain, which were recorded in Jamaica and released in Britain on independent labels. By the time his rendition of Nancy Wilson’s "How Glad I Am" (issued as "Loving You") became an underground dance hall hit, Prophet had moved to London, though material for Jamaican producers such as Winston Riley, Niney the Observer, King Tubby and King Jammy continued to surface. In 1990, as dancehall morphed into the more up-tempo bashment style, based on stripped-down electronic rhythms, Prophet scored significant hits recorded in London in combination with the ragga rapper Daddy Freddy on a re-cut of Michael Scotland's "Hypocrites", and then with Ricky Tuffy on "Your Love and Get Ready".

Though his output subsequently slowed, Prophet continued to release noteworthy material, including "Lead Us O Jah" in 2006, while a collaboration with the Brixton-based Soothsayers band yielded the single "Love Fire" in 2008; other work was subsequently cut for Joe Ariwa, Vibronics, Reggae Roast, Tuff Scout, and Sip-A-Cup. In the live arena, Prophet performed at Rototom Sunsplash, Europe's largest reggae festival, in 2011 and headlined the Lambeth Country Show and later in both 2014 and 2017.

He cites Bob Andy as his main influence as a singer. He had his first Jamaican hit with a version of The Heptones' "Fight It To The Top". His 1980 album Serious Reasoning was released by Island Records in the United Kingdom, establishing his reputation internationally. After working with Yabby You, he also recorded for Henry "Junjo" Lawes, adapting to the prevailing dancehall sound and having his biggest hit with "Gunman". During the first half of the 1980s he recorded for producers such as Don Mais, Al Campbell, Sugar Minott, Niney the Observer, and Winston Riley, cementing his status as one of Jamaica's most popular singers. After living in Miami for a time, he moved to England, where he recorded "Your Love" which reached number one in the UK reggae chart in 1990. It was followed in 1991 by the album Get Ready, which also sold well.

Prophet's distinctive voice—he had a wide vocal range with an unusual "crying" tenor style—and the success of songs such as "Gunman" (1981) meant that his energetic live performances were in high demand on the international festival circuit. He was still performing live even in the last months of his life; his final shows came in September and October 2017, at the Mekudeshet Festival, Jerusalem (14 September), Dub Club @Echoplex, Los Angeles (4 October), and at the Music Box, San Diego (6 October).

Prophet died from a cardiac arrest in Bedford, England, on 16 December 2017, aged 60. He had been battling lung cancer and was suffering from brain tumours. After his death, his family, with Thomas Evers of Rockers Artist Agency, released the highly rated live album Live at plein les Watts.

== Discography ==
=== Albums ===
- Consciousness (1979) Yabby You
- Yabby You & Michael Prophet - Vocal & Dub (1979) Yabby You
- Serious Reasoning (1980) Island
- Righteous Are The Conqueror (1980) Greensleeves/Thompson Sound
- Yabby You & Michael Prophet Meets Scientist at The Dub Station (1981) Yabby You
- Scientist Rids the World of the Evil Curse of the Vampires (1981) Greensleeves
- Know The Right (1981) Prophet
- Prophecy (1981) Yabby U (with Yabby You and Wayne Wade)
- Michael Prophet (Gunman) (1981) Jah Guidance/Thompson Sound
- Stars In Disco Showcase (1982) Yabby You
- Michael Prophet Versions (1983) Yabby You
- Jah Love (1983) Live & Learn
- Love Is An Earthly Thing (1983) CSA, reissued as Reggae Music All Right (2000) and Michael Prophet (2001) both on Dressed To Kill
- Blood Stain (1984) Satta Blue/Ashantites
- Cease Fire (1985) Move
- Settle Fu Ye Settle (1986) Live & Love
- Loving You (1987) Tuff Gong
- Certify (1988) Burning Sounds/CSA
- Michael Prophet & Ricky Tuffy - Get Ready (1991) Passion/Greensleeves
- Bull Talk' (1992) Greensleeves
- Magnet to Steel (1994) Jet Star
- Flimmy and The Prophet (1995, EP) Acid Jazz (with Dread Flimstone)
- Rootsman (1999) Ariwa
- Afrocentric Dub (Black Liberation Chapter 5) (1999)
- Consciousness (2000) Yabby You/Musidisc
- Al Campbell Meets Michael Prophet (2000) Reggae Superstars
- Michael Prophet - Me Deh Ya Again (2004) Wild House UK
- Lead Us O Jah (2006) One Love Records
- Protection (2009) Sip-A-Cup
- King Jammys Presents The Best Of (2012)

=== Compilation albums ===
- Gunman / Righteous Are The Conqueror (1991) Greensleeves (compilation of Righteous are the Conqueror and Michael Prophet (Gunman)
- Cease & Settle (1994) Live & Learn - combines Cease Fire and Settle Fu Ye Settle
- Reggae Superstars Meet In Vocal (2000)
- Barrington Levy, Michael Prophet – Reggae And Ska Twin Pack (2001)
- Michael Prophet – Gunman / Righteous Are The Conqueror (2001)
- Rockers For The Most High (2006) Hard Soul Records
- Original Prophet (Unknown year)
- Live at plein les Watts (2021) Rockers Artist Agency
