= Heyang =

Heyang in Chinese might be represented in different characters referring to

合陽/合阳

- Modern Heyang County, Shaanxi province, PRC.

河陽/河阳

- The historical name of Mengzhou, Henan, Henan province.
- Heyang Township in Guizhou Province (zh:河阳乡)
