= Vic Taylor =

Musical artist (1947–2003)

- Born: Jamaica
- Genres: Reggae, Pop
- Instrument: Vocals,
- Years active: 1961–2003

Vic Taylor (1947 – June 25, 2003) was a Jamaican singer who was in well-known Jamaican groups, Skatalites and Byron Lee & the Dragonaires. He died in 2003.

== History ==
Taylor was once a member of The Skatalites and later, in the 1970s and 1980s, the front man of Byron Lee & the Dragonaires.

During his career, Taylor had hits including "For Your Precious Love" and "Heartaches".

He moved to the US in the early nineties, where he regularly sang on the cabaret and club scene, switching from reggae and R&B to gospel and completing a religious-themed album shortly before his death.

== Death ==
According to family sources, Taylor had been feeling unwell for a couple of weeks and had complained of having chest pains. He was hospitalised for nine days placed on a respirator to assist his breathing difficulties. he died on Monday 23 June 2003. His daughter Vanessa gave his age as 56.

== Discography ==
=== Singles ===
- "Dusty Road" / Version – Dama Nessa 19?
- "For Your Precious Love" / Version – Trojan Records – TR 7856 – 1972

=== Albums ===
- Does It His Way – Dynamic Sounds – DY 3317 – 1972
- Reflections – Dynamic Sounds – DY 3334 – 1973
- Startime – Dynamic Sounds – DY 3362 – 1976
- Goodbye Love – Dynamic Sounds – DY 3393 – 1979
- For Lovers Only – with Janette Silvera – Dynamic Sounds – DY 3425 – 1982
- Your Precious Love – J.C. Records – 002 – 1995
