= Scientist (musician) =

Jamaican recording engineer and producer (born 1960)

- Born: Hopeton Overton Brown; 18 April 1960 (age 66); Kingston, British Jamaica
- Genres: Reggae; dub; dancehall
- Labels: Dub Мир; Greensleeves; Tuff Gong

Hopeton Overton Brown (born 18 April 1960) is a Jamaican recording engineer and producer who rose to fame in the 1980s mixing dub music as "Scientist". A protégé of King Tubby (Osbourne Ruddock), Scientist's contemporaries include several figures who, working at King Tubby's studio, had helped pioneer the genre in the 1970s: Ruddock, Bunny Lee, Philip Smart, Pat Kelly and Prince Jammy.

== 1970s: King Tubby's, Channel One, and Studio One ==
Scientist was introduced to electronics by his father, who worked as a television and radio repair technician. He began building his own amplifiers and would buy transformers from Tubby's Dromilly Road studio. While at the studio, the Scientist asked Tubby to give him a chance at mixing. He was taken on at Tubby's as an assistant, performing tasks such as winding transformer coils, and began working as a mixer in the mid-1970s, initially creating dubs of reworked Studio One tracks for Don Mais's Roots Tradition label, given his chance when Prince Jammy cut short a mixing session for Mais because he was too tired to continue. His name originated from a comment by Bunny Lee to King Tubby, with regard to his technical proficiency, "Damn, this little boy must be a scientist."

He left King Tubby's at the end of the 1970s and became the principal engineer for Channel One when hired by the Hoo Kim brothers, giving him the chance to work on a 16-track mixing desk rather than the four tracks at Tubby's.

== 1980s: King Tubby's, Tuff Gong ==
Scientist came to prominence in the early 1980s and produced many albums, his mixes featuring on many releases in the first part of the decade. He made a series of albums in the early 1980s, released on Greensleeves Records with titles themed around Scientist's fictional achievements in fighting Space Invaders, Pac-Men, and Vampires, and winning the World Cup. The music on these albums was played by Roots Radics, his most frequent collaborators. In particular, he was the favourite engineer of Henry "Junjo" Lawes, for whom he mixed several albums featuring Roots Radics, many based on tracks by Barrington Levy. He also did a lot of work for Linval Thompson and Jah Thomas. In 1982 he left Channel One to work at Tuff Gong studio as second engineer to Errol Brown.

Scientist worked as an engineer in recording studios in the Washington, D.C. area starting in 1985.

In 1991, the album Reggae Español by Panamanian artist Nando Boom was mixed by Scientist. This work blends dancehall with Spanish lyrics, including a Spanish-language version of the song "Dem Bow". Its influence is regarded as a precursor to reggaeton, having contributed to the genre's expansion in New York, Puerto Rico, and Latin America.

== Licensing issues ==
Scientist has alleged in court that Greensleeves originally released albums without his knowledge, according to his interview with United Reggae online magazine. After this, Dub Мир label began working directly with Scientist to reissue his best-known work. In 2016, Greensleeves removed the Scientist moniker for a run of reissues, substituting titles such as Junjo Presents: Wins The World Cup.

== Partial discography ==
- Ranking Dread In Dub King Tubby And Scientist (1981)
- Introducing Scientist: The Best Dub Album in the World (1980)
- Allied Dub Selection (1980) – with Papa Tad's
- Heavyweight Dub Champion (1980)
- Big Showdown at King Tubby's (1980) – with Prince Jammy
- Scientist Meets the Space Invaders (1981)
- Scientist Rids the World of the Evil Curse of the Vampires (1981)
- Scientist Meets the Roots Radics (1981)
- Scientist in the Kingdom of Dub (1981)
- Scientific Dub (1981) Tad's
- Dub Landing Vol. 1 (1981)
- Yabby You & Michael Prophet Meet Scientist at the Dub Station (1981)
- First, Second and Third Generation (1981) – with King Tubby and Prince Jammy
- Dub War (1981)
- World at War (1981)
- Dub Landing Vol. 2 (1982) – with Prince Jammy
- High Priest of Dub (1982)
- Dub Duel (1982) – with Crucial Bunny
- Scientist Encounters Pac-Man (1982)
- The Seducer Dub Wise (1982)
- Scientist Wins the World Cup (1982)
- Dub Duel at King Tubby's (1983) – The Professor
- Scientist & Jammy Strike Back (1983) – with Prince Jammy
- The People's Choice (1983)
- Crucial Cuts Vol. 1 (1984)
- Crucial Cuts Vol. 2 (1984)
- 1999 Dub (1984)
- King of Dub (1987)
- International Heroes Dub (1989)
- Tribute to King Tubby (1990)
- Freedom Fighters Dub (1995)
- Dub in the Roots Tradition (1996)
- Repatriation Dub (1996)
- King Tubby Meets Scientist in a World of Dub (1996) – with King Tubby
- King Tubby's Meets Scientist at Dub Station (1996) – with King Tubby
- Dubbin With Horns (1995)
- Dub Science (1997)
- Dub Science, Dub For Daze, Volume 2 (1997)
- Scientist Meets the Crazy Mad Professor at Channel One Studio (1997)
- Respect Due (Joseph I Meets the Scientist in Tribute to Jackie Mittoo) (1999)
- Mach 1 Beyond Sound Barrier (1999)
- Scientist Kills the Millenium Bug (1999)
- Scientist Dubs Culture Into a Parallel Universe (2000)
- All Hail the Dub Head (2001)
- Ras Portrait (2003)
- Pockets of Resistance (2003)
- Scientist Meets The Pocket (2003–2004)
- Nightshade Meets Scientist (2005) - featuring Wadi Gad
- Dub From the Ghetto (2006) (compilation)
- Dub 911 (2006)
- Scientist Launches Dubstep Into Outer Space (2010)
- Repatriation Dub (2014)
- Scientist Meets Nightshade (2014)
- The Dub Album They Didn't Want You To Hear (2015)
- The Untouchable (2016)
- Scientist Meets Hempress Sativa in Dub (2018)
- Scientist Meets Ral Ston (2021)
- Angels (2023)
