= Johnny Osbourne =

Jamaican singer (born 1948)

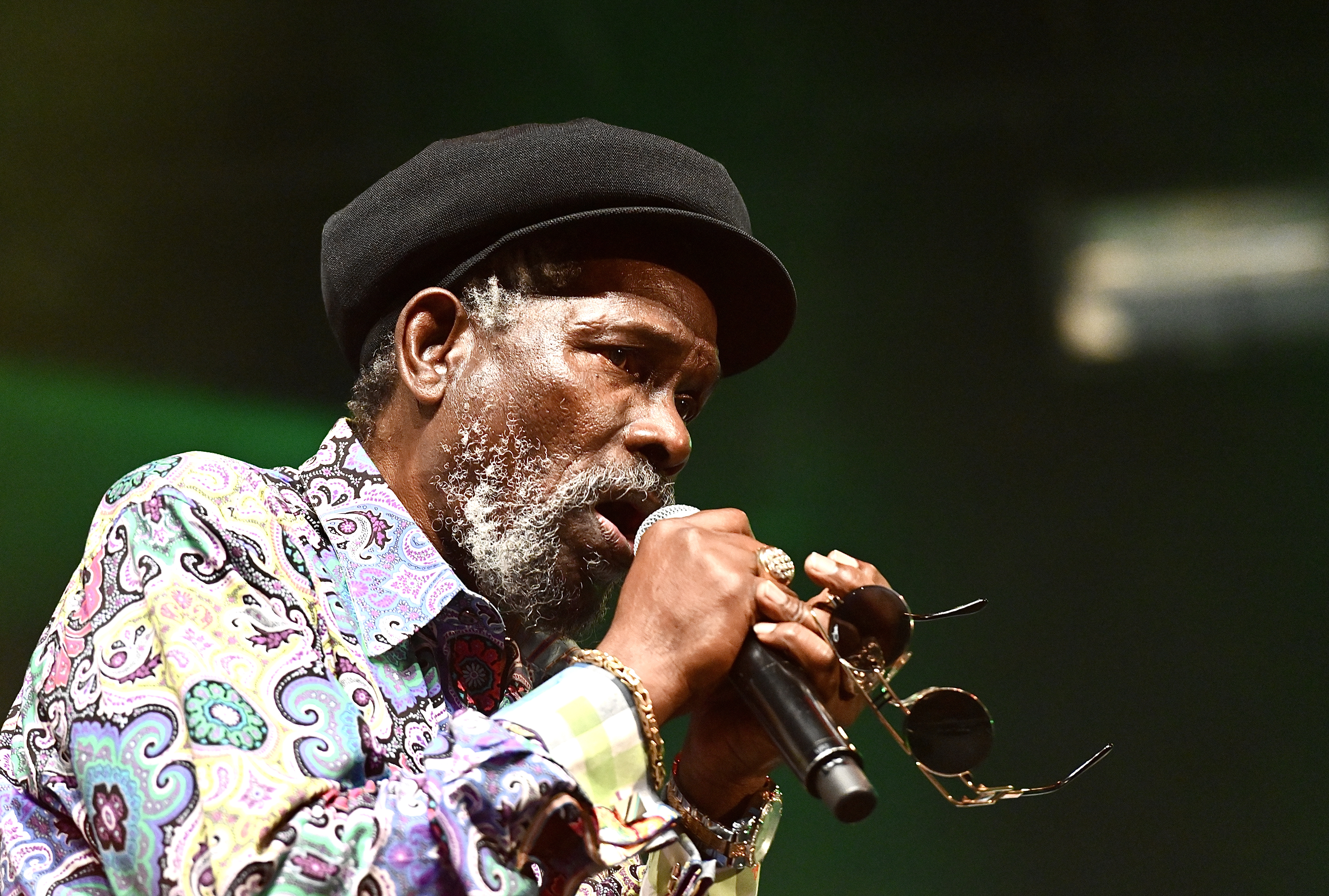
- Johnny Osbourne Live in Brussels, Belgium, 2023

Background information
- Born: Errol Osbourne; 1948 (age 77–78)
- Origin: Kingston, Jamaica
- Genres: Roots reggae, Reggae, Dancehall
- Instrument: Vocals

Johnny Osbourne (born Errol Osbourne, 1948) is a Jamaican reggae and dancehall singer, who rose to success in the late 1970s and mid-1980s. His album Truths and Rights was a roots reggae success, and featured "Jah Promise" and the album's title track, "Truths and Rights".

He also enjoyed big hits with covers of U.S. soul tunes such as "Ready Or Not" and Earth, Wind and Fire's "Reasons". In addition, he has had many songs with the phrase 'Rub A Dub' in the title, the most acclaimed of these is to the "Rub A Dub Session". Osbourne is also the most in-demand vocalist for dubplates due to the amount of dancehall classics he has had. This has resulted in the nickname Dancehall Godfather.

He is probably best known for his mid-1980s dancehall reggae hits "Buddy Bye" (based on King Jammy's Sleng Teng riddim), "Ice Cream Love" and "Water Pumping".

== Career ==
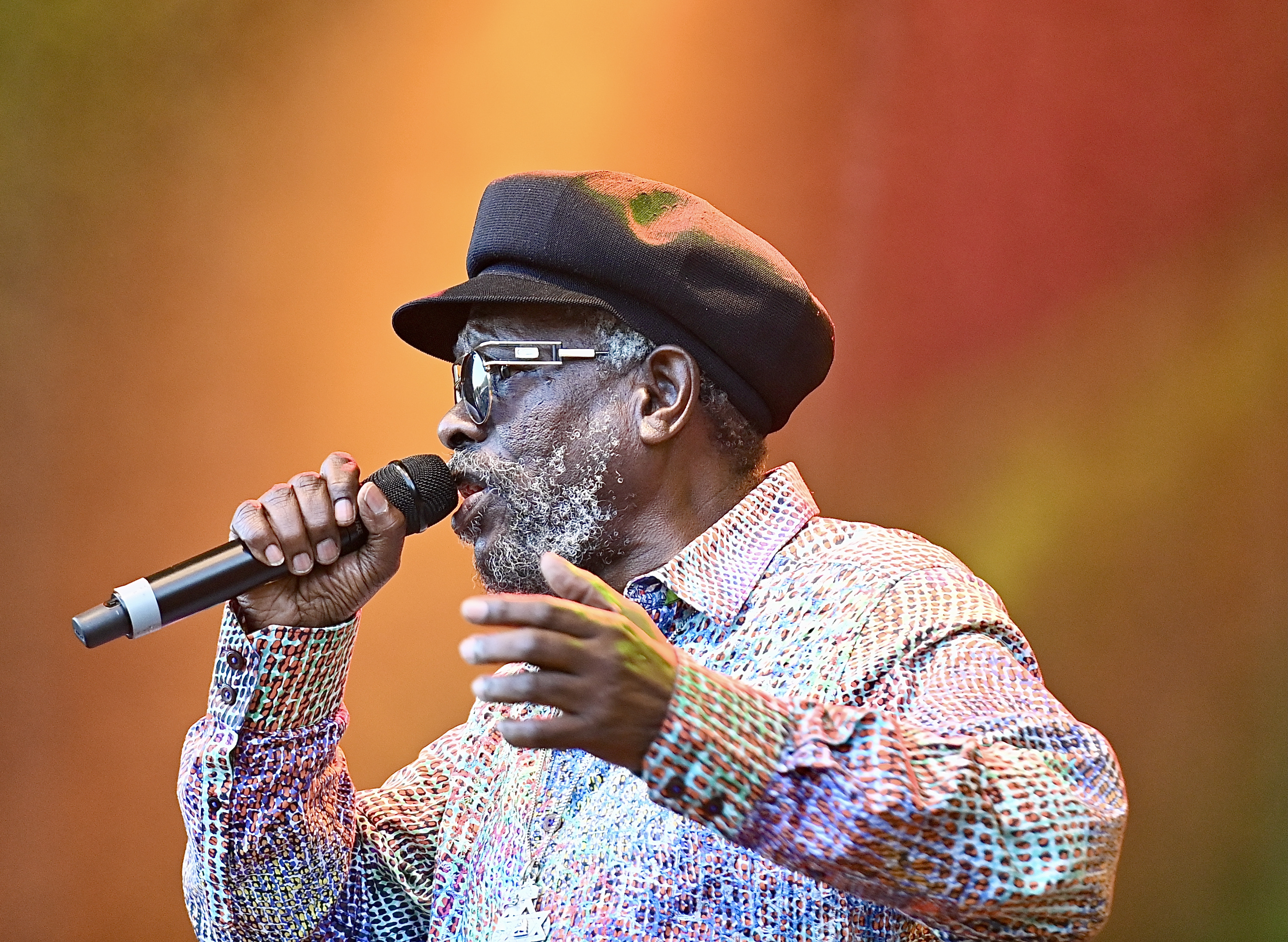
Johnny Osbourne live at Reggae Geel, Belgium, 2023

Johnny Osbourne attended the Alpha Boys School, an orphanage in Kingston, Jamaica that also was home to Yellowman, founding members of the Skatalites, Leroy Smart and Leroy Wallace as well as jazz men Dizzy Reece and Joe Harriott.

During 1967, Osbourne became lead vocalist of The Wildcats, and recorded for producer Winston Riley, although nothing was released. The Wildcats' manager then financed a session at Coxsone Dodd's Studio One, from which his debut single, "All I Have Is Love", was released. In 1969, he recorded the album, Come Back Darling, again for Riley. On the day that he completed the album, Osbourne emigrated to Toronto, Ontario, Canada, to join his family. After singing with various soul and reggae groups, he became lead vocalist for Ishan People, and recorded two albums with them. The group broke up in 1979, and Osbourne decided to return to Jamaica.

Shortly after returning, he recorded "Forgive Them" and "Jealousy, Heartache and Pain" for the Studio One label. Through late 1979 and early 1980, he recorded extensively for Dodd, with these sessions culminating in Truths And Rights. In 1979, he also had a hit for King Jammy (then Prince Jammy) with "Folly Ranking", and an album of the same name followed in 1980. The success of these recordings made him one of the most in-demand vocalists on the island, and albums followed including Fally Lover, Warrior, Innah Disco Style and Never Stop Fighting, between 1980 and 1982. In 1983, he secured hits with "Yo Yo" and "Lend Me A Chopper", and later in the year enjoyed further success with "Water Pumping", an adaptation of Hopeton Lewis' "Take It Easy".

The hits continued with "Get Cracking", "Check For You", "Rewind" (1984), "Buddy Bye", "No Sound Like We" and "In The Area" (1985). In the late 1980s he was particularly successful when recording for Bobby Digital, and had hits with "Good Time Rock" (1988) and "Rude Boy Skank" (1988), both of which are included on his 1989 album, Rougher Than Them. Throughout the 1980s he continued to record for Coxsone Dodd, and singles included "Keep That Light", "Unity" and "A We Run Things".

In 2012, his track "Mr. Marshall" was sampled in Major Lazer's single, "Jah No Partial".

== See also ==
- List of reggae musicians
- List of roots reggae artists
- Heartbeat Records
