= Greensleeves Records =

UK record label

- Parent company: VP Music Group
- Founded: 1975 (record store); 1977 (record label)
- Founder: Chris Sedgwick; Chris Cracknell
- Distributor: VP Records
- Genre: Reggae; Dancehall
- Country of origin: United Kingdom
- Location: 3rd Floor, Masters House, 107 Hammersmith Road, W14 0QH, (London)
- Official website: Official website

Greensleeves Records is a record label specialising in dancehall and reggae music.

== History ==
The company was founded by Chris Cracknell and Chris Sedgwick. Based in Britain, Greensleeves Records started as a small record store in West Ealing, London, in November 1975. The record label was founded in 1977, with early releases including albums by Augustus Pablo and Barrington Levy.

Album artwork was created by photographer David Hendley, and illustrator Tony McDermott.

The company was bought by Zest Inc. in 2006, and in 2008 was bought by VP Records. Included in the sale was Greensleeves Publishing, which administered over 12,000 songs at the time. The sale also included the labels album catalogue of over 400 titles, including those by Shaggy, Shabba Ranks and Yellowman.

== Artists ==
- Red Rat
- Anthony Johnson
- Barrington Levy
- Billy Boyo
- Chezidek
- Dennis Brown
- Dr Alimantado
- Eek-A-Mouse
- Elephant Man
- Freddie McGregor
- Gregory Isaacs
- Keith Hudson
- Mad Cobra
- Scientist
- Shabba Ranks
- Sizzla
- Vybz Kartel
- Yellowman
