= Cameron Greenlee =

American reggae and ska keyboardist

- Also known as: GreenTree Keys
- Born: The Bronx, New York, U.S.
- Origin: Block Island, Rhode Island, U.S.
- Genres: Ska; reggae; dub
- Occupations: Musician; keyboardist; composer; record producer
- Instruments: Keyboards; piano; organ; clavinet
- Years active: 2005–present
- Labels: Naya Records; HoveTo Music; GreenTree Music
- Member of: The Naya Rockers
- Formerly of: The Skatalites
- Website: www.greentree-music.com

Cameron Greenlee (also known as GreenTree Keys) is an American keyboardist, composer, and record producer based on Block Island, Rhode Island. He toured internationally for five years as the keyboardist for the Jamaican ska band The Skatalites, performing at the Montreux Jazz Festival in 2011, recording on their studio album Walk With Me (2012), and contributing tracks to Platinum Ska (2016). He is also the keyboardist for the reggae collective the Naya Rockers and serves as organizational president and artistic director of Block Island's ConserFest.

== Early life ==
According to his official biography, Greenlee was born in the Bronx, New York, and began studying classical piano at the age of five. During his school years, he played both piano and drum set, and also studied tone-wheel and pipe organ, harpsichord, and Brazilian and Latin percussion.

== Career ==
=== Early session work and Cameron & the Trenton Street Collaborative (2008–2009) ===
In 2008, Greenlee was credited with keyboards across ten tracks on Jamaican singer Ernie Smith's studio album Country Mile ("You Are a Lion", "Trouble Trouble", "Zion Bound", "One Man the Same Man", "Kin Kat Pupalick", "Deadly Night in Kingston", "Coming Back from the Floor", "Break Away", "Alone Again", and "Longfellow Serenade") and recorded organ on "Dem A Wondaa" and keyboards on "Reala Dub" for Infinite Dub (Dubs and Instrumentals), a collaborative dub album by the Virgin Islands roots-reggae band Midnite and Lustre Kings.

On 28 August 2009, Greenlee released his debut five-track EP as a bandleader, Cameron & the Trenton Street Collaborative, on the roots-reggae label Naya Records. The release features three original instrumentals composed by Greenlee ("Nor'Easter", "In the Wolves Den", and "Out of Darkness") alongside arrangements of Jackie Mittoo's "Lazy Bones" and "Please Sunrise" (credited on the EP sleeve to Augustus Pablo, after the song written by Barbara Acklin and Eugene Record). Co-produced by Greenlee and drummer Nathan Sabanayagam and mixed and mastered by Will Holland and Eric Welsh at Chillhouse Studios in Charlestown, Massachusetts, the sessions featured Jamaican saxophonist Cedric "Im" Brooks, guitarist Andy Bassford, trumpeter Kevin Batchelor, trombonist Andrae Murchison, bassists Dan Edinberg and M'Talewa Thomas, reed and guitar player Frankie "Ranks" Moniz, melodica player Yusaku Yoshimura, guitarist Geoff Scott, and percussionist Alex Beram.

=== The Skatalites ===
Greenlee (right, at keyboards) performing with The Skatalites alongside guitarist Aurélien "Natty Frenchy" Metsch (left) at Espaço MOG in Campinas, Brazil, in April 2011

Greenlee spent five years touring internationally as the keyboardist for the Jamaican ska band The Skatalites. His documented live appearances with the group include their performance at Miles Davis Hall during the Montreux Jazz Festival on 1 July 2011, their May 2012 UK appearance in Bristol, and 2013 touring alongside founding members Lester Sterling and Doreen Shaffer.

Greenlee served as the keyboardist on the band's studio album Walk With Me (2012), which featured the final studio recordings of founding drummer Lloyd Knibb. Basic tracks for the album were recorded by Bill Sample at Don One Sound Studio in Brooklyn, New York, with Greenlee's Yamaha piano and Hammond B3 organ overdubs recorded by Will Holland at Chillhouse Studios in Charlestown, Massachusetts; Greenlee was also credited on the 2012 Wrasse Records CD sleeve as editor of the liner notes and, alongside his bandmates, as an executive producer. On the Liquidator Music edition on Qobuz and on Discogs, Greenlee is credited as the composer of Track 7, "Piece for Peace" (and as producer on Discogs, noting a printing error on the initial 2012 Wrasse CD sleeve that had repeated Andrae Murchison's credits from Track 6). On the band's 2016 album Platinum Ska (Island Empire Records), Greenlee is credited with keyboards on "Calabash" and "Bamako Ska" and vocals on "Calabash", "Bamako Ska", "Dub Calabash", and "Bamadub Ska".

=== The Naya Rockers and GreenTree Music ===
As a member of the Naya Rockers, the Boston-based live and studio collective associated with Naya Records founded by drummer and producer Nathan Sabanayagam, Greenlee has performed and recorded alongside Sabanayagam and bassist Nate Edgar, and in his career has backed veteran Jamaican artists including Ernie Smith, Clinton Fearon, and Sister Nancy, as well as modern roots-reggae artists including Bushman and Iba Mahr.

In 2024 and 2025, Greenlee recorded keyboards for the Naya Rockers' studio album Higher Education (2025), a collaborative benefit project supporting the Alpha School of Music in Kingston, Jamaica. Basic rhythm tracks for the album were recorded with engineer Wade Koeman at Floki Studios in Iceland alongside Sabanayagam, bassist Nate Edgar, and guitarist Andy Bassford, with additional overdubs by guitarist Earl "Chinna" Smith in Kingston and mixing by Stephen Stewart, Michael "Boxy" Howell, and Sabanayagam at Tuff Gong Studios. Ahead of the album, Greenlee was featured on the 2024 singles "Higher Education" (with Ivan Neville), "Come With Us" (with Clinton Fearon), and "Teach the Youths" (with Sister Nancy).

Under his own production banner, GreenTree Music, and from his recording facility HoveTo Studio on Block Island, Greenlee produced, arranged, and played piano, organ, and clavinet on the 1 March 2022 single "Born a Rastaman" (a reggae arrangement of the Dickey Betts song "Ramblin' Man" featuring vocalist Johnny Dread, guitarist Van Gordon Martin, drummer Nathan Sabanayagam, and percussionist Alejandro Cartin Gulubay, engineered by Will Holland at Chillhouse Studios, mixed by David Goldfine, and mastered by Laurent "Tippie" Alfred). On 1 December 2023, he released the single "Monkey Move" featuring vocalist Toussaint the Liberator, recorded with Will Holland at Chillhouse Studios and Nathan Sabanayagam at Naya Records, and mixed by Alan Evans at Iron Wax Studios. Through his HoveTo Music imprint and HoveTo Studio on Block Island, he subsequently collaborated with vocalist Nena Belén on the singles "There You Are" (2024), "Straight Up" (2025), and "Butterflies" (2026), the last of which was tracked at HoveTo Studio and Rocktorium Records, mixed by Ray Gennari at Rocktorium Records, and mastered by Will Holland at Chillhouse Studios.

== ConserFest ==
In 2008, Greenlee co-founded ConserFest, an annual music and environmental conservation festival held on Block Island that raises awareness and funds for local land and marine preservation concerns, and for which he serves as organizational president and artistic director.

== Discography ==
=== As leader or co-producer ===
- Cameron & the Trenton Street Collaborative (EP, Naya Records, 28 August 2009) – keyboards, melodica, percussion, composer, co-producer
- "Born a Rastaman" (with Johnny Dread) (single, GreenTree Music, 1 March 2022) – piano, organ, clavinet, arranger, producer
- "Monkey Move" (featuring Toussaint the Liberator) (single, GreenTree Music / HoveTo Music, 1 December 2023) – keyboards, co-writer, producer
- "There You Are" (with Nena Belén) (single, HoveTo Music, 20 June 2024)
- "Straight Up" (with Nena Belén) (single, HoveTo Music, 4 September 2025)
- "Butterflies" (with Nena Belén) (single, HoveTo Music, February 2026) – synthesizers, piano, Rhodes, organ, melodica, drum programming, percussion, co-writer, producer

=== With The Skatalites ===
- Walk With Me (Wrasse / Moondust / Liquidator Music, 16 April 2012) – Yamaha piano and Hammond B3 organ, composer and producer ("Piece for Peace"), liner notes editor, executive producer
- Platinum Ska (Island Empire Records, 2016) – keyboards ("Calabash", "Bamako Ska"), vocals ("Calabash", "Bamako Ska", "Dub Calabash", "Bamadub Ska")

=== With the Naya Rockers ===
- "Higher Education" (featuring Ivan Neville) (single, Naya Records / Floki Studios, 1 March 2024) – keyboards
- "Come With Us" (with Clinton Fearon) (single, Naya Records / Floki Studios, 19 July 2024) – keyboards
- "Teach the Youths" (with Sister Nancy) (single, Naya Records / Floki Studios, 2024) – keyboards
- Higher Education (album, Naya Records / Floki Studios / Color Red Music, 2025) – keyboards

=== As guest or session musician ===
- Ernie Smith – Country Mile (Ernie Smith Music Ltd., 2008) – keyboards ("You Are a Lion", "Trouble Trouble", "Zion Bound", "One Man the Same Man", "Kin Kat Pupalick", "Deadly Night in Kingston", "Coming Back from the Floor", "Break Away", "Alone Again", "Longfellow Serenade")
- Midnite and Lustre Kings – Infinite Dub (Dubs and Instrumentals) (Lustre Kings, 2008) – organ ("Dem A Wondaa"), keyboards ("Reala Dub")
