= Errol Dunkley =

Jamaican reggae musician (born 1951)

- Born: 6 February 1951 (age 75)
- Origin: Kingston, Jamaica
- Genres: Reggae, rocksteady
- Instrument: Vocals
- Years active: 1965–present
- Labels: African Museum, Silver Ring Burning Sounds , Gay Feet, Black Joy, Count Shelly, Third World, Joe Gibbs' Amalgamated Records, Island Records

Errol Dunkley (born 6 February 1951), sometimes spelled Erroll Dunkley, is a Jamaican reggae musician, born in Kingston, Jamaica.

== Biography ==
Dunkley's recording career began in 1965, when he was 14, with "Gypsy" (a duet with Roy Shirley) for Linden Pottinger's Gaydisc label, "My Queen" (with Junior English) for Prince Buster, and "Love Me Forever" on the Rio label. In 1965 "My Queen" was also released with a Roland Alphonso 'b' side on the UK-based Blue Beat Records label, then "You Gonna Need Me" was released with Lynn Taitt and the Jets in 1967, for Joe Gibbs on his Amalgamated label. From 1967 to 1968, he recorded several more singles for Joe Gibbs, including "Please Stop Your Lying" (with Tommy McCook, 1967) and "Love Brother" (1968), before switching to Coxsone Dodd in 1969.

In the early 1970s he released music on Pama Records featuring collaborations with mic-chanter U-Roy and "God's Son" Glen Brown, before forming the African Museum record label with Gregory Isaacs. Isaacs soon took sole control of the label, and Dunkley formed Silver Ring, a new label.

In 1972, he teamed up with producer Jimmy Radway for two of his most popular singles, "Keep the Pressure Down" and "Black Cinderella". Both tunes were re-released on Radway's Fi Me Time label in 2000, on a conscious roots-rock-revive album titled Keep the Pressure Down, with versions by Augustus Pablo, Vin Gordon, Desmond "Desi-Roots" Young, Leroy Smart, Bobby Ellis, Hortense Ellis and Big Youth. The same year saw the release of Dunkley's debut album, Presenting Errol Dunkley, produced by Sonia Pottinger, which included the track "A Little Way Different". In the late 1970s he released the roots reggae vocal and dub Disco Showcase on the UK label Black Joy, gaining an audience amongst the followers of Lloyd Coxsone and Jah Shaka sound systems. Dunkley's output in 1979 and 1980, Profile of Errol Dunkley (with Roots Radics) and the Lord Koos' release Militant Man, both feature a various mix of lovers' rock and conscious cultural roots-rock music, such as his version of Horace Andy's Jah Guiding Star, and the Repatriation 45, released on the Aggrovator label.

Dunkley continued to record throughout the 1970s and toward the end of the decade his popularity in the UK grew, resulting in a breakthrough UK Singles Chart hit in 1979 with "OK Fred", a cover version of a song written by John Holt, that reached number 11. His 1980 release "Sit Down And Cry" also reached the chart.

In 1994, Linval Thompson released a digital roots version of Dunkley's tune "Little Way Different" on his Thompson's Sound record label.

Dunkley re-recorded "OK Fred", his biggest hit, in 1996 with Queen Sister *N*.

In 2004, Dunkley released an album of cover-versions with Bunny Lee and Tapper Zukie, collecting his own interpretations of classical conscious-revive tunes such as Slim Smith’s Beatitudes, Dennis Brown-The Paragons’ Man Next Door ( based on Garnet Mimms & The Enchanters Soul R & B composition, Quiet Place), and Ken Boothe and Keith Hudson’s Old Fashioned Way.

== Influence on other genres ==
Kenny Ken, British jungle and drum and bass DJ and producer rose to prominence with his first big track "Everyman", which was built on a version of Willi Williams' and Coxsone Dodd's foundation one drop Armagideon Time Real Rock riddim, sampling the vocal from Errol Dunkley's song, "Little Way Different." In the mid-2000s UK rap British hip-hop-reggae-fusion outfit Cut La Vis released their remix of "A Little Way Different". British drum and bass artist Murdock has also produced a version of the tune under the title Every Man Do His Jungle Mix.

== Albums ==
- Darling Ooh (Gay Feet, 1972), also released as Presenting Errol Dunkley – (a four star AMG recommendation)
- Sit and Cry Over You (Third World, 1976)
- Militant Man (Lovella International, 1980)
- Profile of Errol Dunkley aka OK Fred (Third World, 1980)
- In a Different, Different Style (Easy Street Records, 1984)
- Special Request (Carousel, 1987)
- Aquarius (1989)
- The Early Years (Rhino, 1995)
- Please Stop Your Lying (early Joe Gibbs recordings) (Rocky One, 1996)
- Continually (2000)
- OK Fred (The Best Of) (Trojan 2004)
- Love Is Amazing (Studio One)
- Moodie Meets Errol Dunkley (Moodie Music)
- OK Fred - Storybook Revisited - Errol Dunkley (Burning Sounds ) 2020

== See also ==
- List of reggae musicians
- List of performers on Top of the Pops
