= Live at Shea Stadium =

Live album by The Clash
- Released: 6 October 2008
- Recorded: 13 October 1982
- Venue: Shea Stadium (New York City)
- Genres: Punk rock, hard rock
- Length: 49:05
- Label: Epic
- Producer: The Clash

The Clash compilations and lives chronology
The Singles (2007)	Live at Shea Stadium (2008)	Sound System (2013)

Live at Shea Stadium is a live album by the English punk rock band the Clash. It was recorded at Shea Stadium in New York City on 13 October 1982, the band's second night opening for the Who; the concert was produced by Kosmo Vinyl. The album features Terry Chimes on drums instead of Topper Headon, who was fired for heroin abuse earlier in the year. The original recordings were unearthed by Clash frontman Joe Strummer while packing for a move. The album was released in the United Kingdom on 6 October 2008 and in the United States the following day.

== Reception ==
Professional ratings
Aggregate scores
Source	Rating
Metacritic	81/100
Review scores
Source	Rating
AllMusic	3.5/5 stars
Alternative Press	4/5 stars
Blender	3.5/5 stars
musicOMH	4/5 stars
Pitchfork	7.7/10
PopMatters	8/10
Q	4/5 stars
Rolling Stone	4/5 stars
Spin	8/10
Uncut	5/5 stars

Reception for Live at Shea Stadium was very positive. Review aggregator Metacritic, which collates reviews from various publications, indicates a score of 81 (indicating "Universal acclaim").

== Track listing ==
All tracks are written by Joe Strummer and Mick Jones, except where noted.

No.	Title	Length
1.	"Kosmo Vinyl Introduction" (Concert introduction)	1:10
2.	"London Calling"	3:29
3.	"Police on My Back" (written by Eddy Grant; originally performed by The Equals)	3:28
4.	"The Guns of Brixton" (written by Paul Simonon)	4:06
5.	"Tommy Gun"	3:19
6.	"The Magnificent Seven" (written by The Clash)	2:33
7.	"Armagideon Time" (written by Willi Williams and Jackie Mittoo; originally performed by Willi Williams)	2:55
8.	"The Magnificent Seven (Return)" (written by The Clash)	2:23
9.	"Rock the Casbah" (written by The Clash)	3:21
10.	"Train in Vain"	3:45
11.	"Career Opportunities"	2:05
12.	"Spanish Bombs"	3:18
13.	"Clampdown"	4:26
14.	"English Civil War" (Traditional; arranged by Strummer and Jones)	2:39
15.	"Should I Stay or Should I Go" (written by The Clash)	2:44
16.	"I Fought the Law" (written by Sonny Curtis)	3:22
Total length:		49:05

== Film footage ==
The performances of "Career Opportunities" and "Should I Stay Or Should I Go" are widely available. On 11 December 2020, during a Q&A celebrating the debut of his music video for "The Magnificent Seven", Don Letts confirmed that only "Career Opportunities" and "Should I Stay or Should I Go" were filmed. The Who's headline performance was released on DVD in 2015.

== Personnel ==
- Joe Strummer – lead vocals, rhythm guitar, bass on "The Guns of Brixton"
- Mick Jones – lead guitar, vocals
- Paul Simonon – bass, backing vocals, lead vocals and rhythm guitar on "The Guns of Brixton"
- Terry Chimes – drums

Production

- Glyn Johns – original recording
- David Bates; Mark Frith – restoration, mixing
- Tim Young – master recording
- Bob Gruen; Joe Stevens – photography

== Charts ==
Chart (2008)	Peak position
Belgian Albums (Ultratop Wallonia)	75
French Albums (SNEP)	57
Italian Albums (FIMI)	22
Scottish Albums (Official Charts)	30
Swedish Albums (Sverigetopplistan)	26
UK Albums (Official Charts)	31
US Billboard 200	93
US Independent Albums (Billboard)	6
