= Armagideon Time =

Single by Willie Williams

from the album Armagideon Time
- Released: 1979
- Recorded: 1977
- Studio: Jamaica Recording Studio (Kingston, Jamaica)
- Genre: Reggae
- Length: 4:00
- Label: Studio One
- Songwriters: Clement Seymour Dodd; Wilbert Keith Williams
- Producer: Clement "Coxsone" Dodd

"Armagideon Time" (spelt as "Armigedeon Time" in some versions) is a song by Jamaican reggae musician Willie Williams. It was produced by Clement "Coxsone" Dodd, who used the "Real Rock" riddim. It was first recorded in 1977 at Jamaica Recording Studio in Kingston, Jamaica, and released as a single in 1979 via Studio One. The single was re-released in 1980 and 1982 through Coxsone Records as a title track to Williams' second studio album of the same name. The song was covered by English punk rock band The Clash in 1979 and released as the B-side to their single "London Calling".

== In popular culture; influence on other genres ==
The song was featured in the 1999 Jim Jarmusch's film Ghost Dog: The Way of the Samurai, and appeared in the 2004 video game Grand Theft Auto: San Andreas on the fictional reggae radio station K-JAH Radio West (but wasn't included on the soundtrack album).

The song was sampled by KRS-One on the track "Black Cop" from his 1993 album Return of the Boom Bap, and by Fugees on the track "Zealots" from their 1996 album The Score.

In 1994, Kenny Ken, British jungle and drum and bass DJ and producer rose to prominence with his first big track "Everyman",which was built on a version of Willi Williams' and Coxsone Dodd's foundation one drop Armagideon Time Real Rock riddim, sampling the vocal from Errol Dunkley's song, Little Way Different.

== The Clash version ==
English band the Clash released a cover of "Armagideon Time" as the B-side for their "London Calling" single in 1979.

Prior to recording the song, the members of the Clash had been speaking to their associate Kosmo Vinyl, who believed that the ideal length for a single was two minutes and 58 seconds. Clash vocalist Joe Strummer asked Vinyl to stop the recording at that point in the song – something that Vinyl did by announcing the time to the band through the studio intercom: "All right, time's up! Let's have you out of there!". However, Strummer was enthusiastic about the recording session, and improvised a response in time to the music: "Ok, ok! Don't push us when we're hot!". The band continued playing, with a take of three minutes and 50 seconds.

Vinyl was worried that the band would be upset about him interrupting their perfect take, but the pre-planned interruption ended up adding to the charm of the recording. Strummer later recorded overdubs for the vocals that follow Vinyl's interruption, and Mick Jones overdubbed an electric sitar onto the track. The Clash frequently performed the song in concert for the rest of their career; a live recording appears on the Concerts for the People of Kampuchea charity album.

== Track listing ==
1979
No.	Title	Writer(s)	Producer	Length
1.	"Armigedeon Time" (performed by Willy Williams)	W. Williams; C. Dodd	Clement "Coxsone" Dodd
2.	"Armagideon Version" (performed by Willie & Brentford Rockers)		Clement "Coxsone" Dodd

Note: B-side track "Armagedeon Version" titled as "Armagedeon Style" on some versions

1980, 1982
No.	Title	Writer(s)	Producer	Length
1.	"Armagedeon Time"	W. Williams; C. Dodd; J. Mitto	Clement "Coxsone" Dodd
2.	"Armagedeon Version" (featuring Sound Dimension)		Clement "Coxsone" Dodd
