= Clement Bushay =

British reggae producer (born 1955)

- Born: c. 1955 (age 70–71)
- Genres: Reggae, lovers rock
- Occupation: Record producer
- Years active: Early 1970s–2000s
- Labels: Trojan, Burning Sounds, Bushays, Bushranger

Clement "Clem" Bushay (born c. 1955) is a British reggae producer who also ran the Bushays record label.

== Biography ==
Hailed the creator of the 'lovers rock' genre in the UK, Bushay's productions in the early 1970s were issued by Trojan Records, and he produced early releases by Owen Gray and Louisa Mark (including her hit "Keep It Like It Is"). Bushay was one of the early producers of UK lovers rock. He produced the debut album by Tapper Zukie, Man a Warrior in 1973, some of which reworked dub versions of Randy Chin productions, like Lloyd Parks' "Ordinary Man". He became a regular producer for UK-based reggae artists such as Junior English and Janet Kay, and also for Jamaican artists, producing Dillinger and Trinity's Clash album, and recordings by Rico Rodriguez. Bushay had a reggae chart-topper with Louisa Mark's "Six Sixth Street". After working for several years with the Burning Sounds label, when that folded he formed his own Bushays label in the late 1970s, largely concentrating on lovers rock, with productions of artists such as Janet Kay, Al Campbell, and Dave Barker. He also set up another label, Bushranger. The Bushays label continued throughout the 1980s, with releases by the Morwells, Prince Jazzbo, Gregory Isaacs, Tony Tuff, Barrington Levy, and Jah Thomas.

Bushay's daughter Silhouette Bushay was featured as a vocalist on Clement's tracks "So I Can Love You" and "Why Did You Let Me Down".

== Albums ==
- Reggae for Lovers
- Dread in Session
