= Walk with Me (The Skatalites album) =

Studio album by The Skatalites
- Released: April 16, 2012
- Recorded: Late 2010 – March 2012
- Studios: Don One Sound Studio (Brooklyn, New York); Wadada Studio; Chillhouse Studios (Charlestown, Massachusetts); Island Gruve Music Works (Atlanta, Georgia)
- Genres: Ska; rocksteady; reggae; dub
- Length: 40:12
- Labels: Wrasse; Moondust; Liquidator Music
- Producer: The Skatalites (also exec.)

The Skatalites chronology
On the Right Track (2007)	Walk with Me (2012)	Platinum Ska (2016)

Walk with Me is a studio album by the Jamaican ska band The Skatalites, first released in April 2012 on Wrasse Records and Moondust Records, with subsequent European vinyl and compact disc editions issued by Liquidator Music and Jamaican Jazz Records in September 2013.

The album features the final studio recordings of the band's co-founder and drummer Lloyd Knibb, who played drums on nine of the album's eleven tracks before his death on 12 May 2011. In the album liner notes, the group dedicated the release to late founding members Jerome "Jah Jerry" Haynes, John "Dizzy Johnny" Moore, and Lloyd Knibb, and dedicated their cover of "Song for My Father" to saxophonist Cedric "Im" Brooks.

== Background and recording ==
Recording sessions for Walk with Me began in late 2010 and concluded in March 2012. Basic rhythm tracks were engineered by Bill Sample at Don One Sound Studio in Brooklyn, New York, a studio founded by Donald Moodie, a relative of Studio One founder Clement "Coxsone" Dodd. The band prioritised recording the foundational drum tracks with founding drummer Lloyd Knibb (tracks 1, 2, and 5–11) prior to his death in May 2011 at age 80, with touring drummer Trevor "Sparrow" Thompson playing drums on tracks 3 and 4.

Additional instrumental overdubs were recorded by guitarist Aurélien "Natty Frenchy" Metsch at Wadada Studio and by Errol Moore at Island Gruve Music Works Studio in Atlanta, Georgia. As the sole keyboardist on the album, Cameron Greenlee played all piano and organ parts across the eleven tracks, recording his Yamaha piano and Hammond B3 organ both during the sessions at Don One Sound Studio in Brooklyn and with engineer Will Holland at Chillhouse Studios in Charlestown, Massachusetts. Mixing was handled by Metsch and bassist Val Douglas at Wadada Studio (tracks 1, 2, and 5–11) and by Anastas "Nas-T" Hackett and Douglas at Over The Bridge Studio (tracks 3 and 4), with mastering by Alex Valenti at One Vibration Studio.

Unlike several earlier Skatalites releases that revisited 1960s standards, Walk With Me centred on original compositions written by the active touring lineup. Band manager and former keyboardist Ken Stewart told the Santa Barbara Independent that "every member composed or cowrote a tune and contributed in every way to the end result." The album title was taken from trombonist Andrae Murchison's composition "Walk With Me", symbolising that the group's late founding members were "walking with us as we continue their legacy and journey to spread this music around the world."

== Composition ==
The album opens with "Desert Ska", written by tenor saxophonist Azemobo "Zem" Audu and featuring guest vocal appearances by Ansel Meditations and Jamaican deejay Ranking Joe, followed by guitarist Aurélien Metsch's instrumental "Lalibela" and its closing dub counterpart "Dub Lalibela" (featuring guest vocalist Sunny Moon). Founding vocalist Doreen Shaffer sings lead on "Love Is the Way" (which also features guest trumpeter Rich Graiko), while founding alto saxophonist Lester Sterling composed "Little Teresa" and founding drummer Lloyd Knibb composed "King Solomon".

Track 7, "Piece for Peace", was composed and produced by keyboardist Cameron Greenlee (credited to Greenlee on the Liquidator Music edition and Qobuz, correcting a printing error on the initial 2012 Wrasse CD sleeve that had repeated Andrae Murchison's composer and producer credits from track 6). The album also includes a ska arrangement of Horace Silver's jazz standard "Song for My Father".

== Critical reception ==
Writing for World Music Central, Angel Romero praised the album for honouring the group's 1960s roots while showcasing original compositions, tight brass interplay from both veteran and newer members, and keyboardist Cameron Greenlee's track "Piece for Peace". Grateful Web highlighted the release for pairing founding drummer Lloyd Knibb's final studio recordings with original contributions from the band's touring lineup.

== Track listing ==
No.	Title	Writer(s)	Length
1.	"Desert Ska" (featuring Ansel Meditations and Ranking Joe)	Azemobo "Zem" Audu	4:19
2.	"Lalibela"	Aurélien "Natty Frenchy" Metsch	3:46
3.	"Hot Flash"	Val Douglas	3:21
4.	"The Leader"	Kevin Batchelor	3:37
5.	"Love Is the Way" (featuring Doreen Shaffer)	Val Douglas, Aurélien Metsch, M. Johnson, Trevor "Sparrow" Thompson	2:45
6.	"Walk with Me"	Andrae Murchison	3:40
7.	"Piece for Peace"	Cameron Greenlee	4:50
8.	"Song for My Father"	Horace Silver	4:11
9.	"Little Teresa"	Lester Sterling	2:42
10.	"King Solomon"	Lloyd Knibb	3:14
11.	"Dub Lalibela" (featuring Sunny Moon)	Aurélien "Natty Frenchy" Metsch	3:47
Total length:			40:12

== Personnel ==
Credits adapted from the 2012 Wrasse Records CD liner notes (WRASS302) and Qobuz metadata.

The Skatalites

- Lester Sterling – alto saxophone, flute, producer (track 9), executive producer
- Doreen Shaffer – lead vocals (track 5), executive producer
- Lloyd Knibb – drums (tracks 1, 2, 5–11; final studio recordings)
- Val Douglas – bass guitar, producer (track 3), mixing, executive producer
- Aurélien "Natty Frenchy" Metsch – guitar, producer (tracks 2, 5, 11), overdub engineer, mixing (tracks 1, 2, 5–11), executive producer
- Cameron Greenlee – Yamaha piano and Hammond B3 organ (all tracks), composer and producer (track 7), liner notes editor, executive producer
- Azemobo "Zem" Audu – tenor saxophone, producer (track 1), executive producer
- Andrae Murchison – trombone, producer (track 6), executive producer
- Kevin Batchelor – trumpet, producer (track 4), executive producer
- Trevor "Sparrow" Thompson – drums (tracks 3, 4), producer (track 5), executive producer

Guest musicians

- Ansel Meditations – guest vocals (track 1)
- Ranking Joe – guest vocals (track 1)
- Rich Graiko – guest trumpet (track 5)
- Sunny Moon – guest vocals (track 11)

Production and technical credits

- Bill Sample – recording engineer (Don One Sound Studio, Brooklyn, New York)
- Will Holland – piano and Hammond B3 overdub engineer (Chillhouse Studios, Charlestown, Massachusetts)
- Errol Moore – overdub engineer (Island Gruve Music Works Studio, Atlanta, Georgia)
- Anastas "Nas-T" Hackett – mixing engineer (tracks 3, 4 at Over The Bridge Studio)
- Alex Valenti – mastering engineer (One Vibration Studio)
- Ken Stewart – management, liner notes
- Tom Booth (Badtown Design Co.) – artwork and jacket layout

== Release history ==
Region	Date	Format	Label	Catalog
United Kingdom	16 April 2012	CD, digital	Wrasse Records / Moondust Records	WRASS302
Japan	2013	CD	Ska In The World Records	SIWI-202
Spain & Europe	25 September 2013	CD, LP	Liquidator Music / Jamaican Jazz Records	LQ064 / LQ064LP / JJ-LP-002
Europe	25 August 2025	LP (reissue)	Liquidator Music	LQ064LP
