= Junior English =

Jamaican reggae singer (1951–2023)

Background information
- Born: Lindel Beresford English; 1951; Kingston, Jamaica
- Died: 10 March 2023 (aged 71)
- Genres: Reggae
- Instrument: Vocals
- Years active: Early 1960s–2023
- Labels: Trojan; Burning Vibrations; Burning Sounds; Burning Rockers; International English

Lindel Beresford English (1951 – 10 March 2023), better known as Junior English, was a Jamaican reggae singer who began his career in the early 1960s before relocating to England.

== Biography ==
English was born in Kingston, Jamaica in 1951. He began performing as a teenager and recorded early tracks such as "Fay is Gone" and "My Queen" (a duet with Errol Dunkley) for producer Prince Buster in the early–mid 1960s. He relocated to England in 1964, living at first in Preston then London, where he completed his education. After entering and winning a talent contest organised by the Palmer brothers (of Pama Records), he joined The Magnets, with whom he toured Europe. He then joined The Nighthawks, releasing an album with the group in 1969, Man it's Reggae, before restarting his solo career the same year. He had a string of reggae hits in the early 1970s, working with producer Clement Bushay, but his career was interrupted when he served a six-month prison sentence for driving whilst disqualified. While in prison, he wrote many of the songs that would appear on his debut solo album, The Dynamic Junior English, released in 1974. This was followed in 1976 by The Great Junior English, but his most prolific year would come in 1978, when four albums were released, and he had a Christmas number one on the UK reggae chart with "In Loving You". His success continued through the 1980s, and he set up his own International English label for many of his subsequent releases. In 1985, he contributed to the British Reggae Artists Famine Appeal single "Let's Make Africa Green Again". He continued to perform and record into the 1990s and 2000s, with cover versions of "Queen Majesty" and "Cruising", and the album Mr. Man.

English died on 10 March 2023, at the age of 71.

== Discography ==
=== Albums ===
- The Dynamic Junior English (1974), Cactus
- The Great Junior English (1976), Horse
- Crashed! (1978), Form
- Naturally High (1978), Burning Vibrations (JA)/Burning Sounds (UK)
- Jack the Ripper (1978), Form
- Win Some Lose Some (1978), Burning Sounds
- Lovers Key (1980), Burning Vibrations/Burning Rockers
- The Best of Junior English (1980), Exclusive
- Two of a Kind (1983), Sunsplash
- In Loving You (1988)
- Mister Man (1990), International English
- Come With Me (2008), Jet Star
- U Make Me Happy (2010), International English

=== Singles ===
- "Fay is Gone" (1964), Blue Beat
- "My Queen" (1964), Blue Beat (with Errol Dunkley)
- "Nobody Knows" (1969), Camel
- "Miss Playgirl"
- "Daniel" (1973), Pama Supreme
- "I Don't Want to Die" (1973), Pama
- "Jesamine" (1971), Pama
- "Anniversary" (1972), Banana
- "One & Only Lover" (1973), Count Shelly
- "I'm Back on the Scene" (1974), Trojan
- "I Hear My Train" (197?), Horse
- "Lady Madana" (1976), Jama
- "Be Thankful" (1977), Ethnic Fight
- "Daddy Is Home" (197?), Ethnic
- "Muriel" (197?), Ethnic
- "Love & Key" (1978), Burning Rockers
- "Never Loose Never Win" (1977), Burning Sounds
- "The Way We Were" (1978), Exclusive
- "You Don't Care" (197?), Exclusive – with Errol Scorcher
- "Natural High" (1979), Burning Rockers
- "Stop Using Love" (19??), Burning Rockers
- "I am the One Who Loves You" (19??), Burning Rockers
- "You are so Good to Me" (1978), Form
- "Take Care of Yourself" (1981), Form
- "I am so Happy" (1982), Form
- "Don't Cry" (19??), Form
- "Ready to Learn", International English
- "Only Sixteen" (1984), PRT
- "Never Too Late" (198?), International English
- "Loneliness" (198?), U Mat
- "Don't Cry" (1987), Exclusive – B-side of Jackie Paris – "Once in My Life"
- "Got to Come Back" (19??), Venture
- "Between You & Me" (19??), International English – with Christine Joy White
- "We Can Work It Out" (19??), Cha Cha
