= A Dream (album) =

Studio album by Max Romeo
- Released: 1969
- Recorded: 1968–1969
- Genre: Reggae
- Label: Pama
- Producers: Bunny Lee, Derrick Morgan, Harry Dee

Max Romeo chronology
A Dream (1969)	Let the Power Fall (1971)

A Dream is an album by Max Romeo, released in 1969.

The album, due to its cover design, is often referred to as A Dream by Max Romeo. Produced by Bunny Lee, it featured Max Romeo's first hit, the lyrically explicit "Wet Dream". Tracks like "Wood Under Cellar", "Wine Her Goosie" and "The Horn" continued the rude theme, though songs such as "Far Far Away" and "Love" were more traditional ballads, the latter made more outstanding through vibrant Rastafari-influenced percussion; "Club Raid" speaks of Romeo’s survival of a punitive police bust.

== Track listing ==
All tracks composed by Max Romeo except where indicated.

Side A

1. "Wet Dream" - 2:45
2. "A No Fe Me Piccn'y" - 3:12
3. "Far Far Away" - 3:01
4. "The Horn" - 2:22
5. "Hear My Plea" - 3:24
6. "Love" - 3:02

Side B

1. "I Don't Want to Lose Your Love" - 3:00
2. "Wood Under Cellar" - 2:30
3. "Wine Her Goosie" (Harry Dee) - 3:03
4. "Club Raid" - 2:43
5. "You Can't Stop Me" - 2:20

== Personnel ==
- Max Romeo - vocals
- Errol Daniels - lead guitar
- The Rudies - backing band
- Derrick Morgan, Ranford "Ronnie" Williams - arrangements

Technical

- Tony Pike - engineer
- Carl Palmer, Jeff Palmer - cover

== Singles ==
- 1968: "Wet Dream"
- 1969: "Wine Her Goosie"
