= Sir Collins =

Jamaican-born British music producer

Charles Collins (1937 – March 2018), known professionally as Sir Collins or Clancy Collins, was a Jamaican-born British music producer, record label owner and sound system operator. He was a pioneer in sound system culture in the UK and was part of the development of deejaying or toasting in ska and rocksteady. He co-founded the Four Aces Club in Dalston, London with Newton Dunbar and others. In 1967 he started the Collins Down Beat record label in London, releasing rocksteady productions by Bunny Lee and Sir Collins including the label's first release “Sir Collins Special” by Lester Sterling, which is thought to be one of the first songs with deejaying over the music.
