= Open the Iron Gate: 1973–77 =

Compilation album by Max Romeo
- Released: June 8, 1999
- Recorded: 1973–1977
- Genre: Reggae
- Length: 54:33
- Label: Blood and Fire
- Producer: Max Romeo

Max Romeo chronology
| Selassie I Forever (1998) | Open the Iron Gate: 1973–77 (1999) | The Many Moods of Max Romeo (1999) |

Professional ratings
Review scores
| Source | Rating |
|---|---|
| Allmusic | 4/5 stars |
| Entertainment Weekly | A− |
| Reggae Reviews | 3/5 stars |

Open the Iron Gate: 1973–77 is a reggae compilation album by Max Romeo, released in 1999.

The compilation consists mostly of the material from Romeo's 1975 album Revelation Time, adding four songs recorded between 1973 and 1977: "Every Man Ought to Know", "Valley of Jehosaphat", "Fire Fe the Vatican" and "Melt Away". The album was listed in the 1999 book The Rough Guide: Reggae: 100 Essential CDs. The album includes an essay by Steve Barrow in its liner notes.

== Track listing ==
1. "Every Man Ought to Know" – 3:18
2. "Revelation Time/Hammer and Sickle" – 5:06
3. "No Peace" – 3:43
4. "Tacko" – 2:49
5. "Blood of the Prophet Parts 1 & 2" – 6:24
6. "Warning Warning/Version" – 7:42
7. "A Quarter Pound of I'cense" – 2:43
8. "Three Blind Mice" – 2:54
9. "Open the Iron Gate Parts 1 & 2" – 5:14
10. "Valley of Jehosaphat/Version" – 5:02
11. "Fire Fe the Vatican" – 3:33
12. "Melt Away" (12" Version) – 6:05

== Personnel ==
- Max Romeo – vocals
- Aston Barrett – bass
- Carlton "Carlie" Barrett – drums
- Tony Chin – guitar
- Geoffrey Chung – bass, keyboards
- Glen DaCosta – tenor saxophone
- Carlton "Santa" Davis – drums
- Tyrone Downie – keyboards, harmonica
- Bobby Ellis – flugelhorn
- George Fullwood – bass
- Vin Gordon – trombone
- "Dirty" Harry Hall – horns
- Bernard "Touter" Harvey – keyboards
- Clive "Azul" Hunt – bass, percussion, keyboards
- Earl Lindo – organ, clavinet
- Robert Lyn – keyboards
- David Madden – trumpet
- Lee "Scratch" Perry – percussion
- Ernest Ranglin – guitar
- Earl "Chinna" Smith – guitar
- Keith Sterling – piano
- Uziah "Sticky" Thompson – percussion
- Winston Wright – keyboards
- Derrick Stewart – drums
- Mike Murray – guitar, percussion
