= Crissy Criss =

British DJ, radio producer and presenter

Chris Williamson (born 6 May 1987), better known by his stage name Crissy Criss, is a British DJ, radio producer and presenter, who was part of the BBC Radio network BBC Radio 1Xtra. He has also worked under the moniker Dead Exit.

Crissy Criss is the stepson of Kenny Ken and was born in Newmarket, Suffolk and raised in Leytonstone.

== Career ==
The youngest DJ/Presenter at present to broadcast on BBC Radio 1Xtra, he was introduced to a set of decks aged five by his stepfather Kenny Ken, where he then started to teach himself to mix aged nine. The following year, Crissy covered for Kenny Ken at a festival in Essex. At age 11 he joined drum & bass pirate station, Kool FM, and played his first club set at The End in London, thanks to DJ Zinc who requested Crissy to play.

Williamson has played at major drum & bass nights across the UK and internationally such as New York, Toronto, Norway, Switzerland, France, and Germany. Crissy started producing at the age of 12 making music on a gaming console, before upgrading to a DAW and hardware equipment. He released his first track on Back2Basics Records in 2004. Since then Crissy has signed to Back2Basics Records and Mix 'n' Blen Records. In 2010 he released his debut album, "Give You The World", in collaboration with MC and singer Youngman. In 2019 he released his sophomore album, "War On Silence".

He presented a regular show on BBC 1Xtra from 2007, which was axed as part of the station's budget cuts in June 2014. An online petition was launched to persuade the BBC to revert this decision, but it proved to be unsuccessful.
