= Errol Scorcher =

- Born: Errol Archer; 1956; Saint Catherine Parish, Jamaica
- Died: 19 January 2012 (aged 55–56)
- Genre: Reggae
- Instrument: Vocals
- Labels: Ballistic, Scorcher

Errol Scorcher (born Errol Archer; 1956 – 19 January 2012) was a Jamaican reggae deejay.

== Biography ==
Scorcher worked as a deejay on several sound systems from the early 1970s. Although his first single, "Leggo Mi Hand Babylon" was not a commercial success, he had several hits in the mid-1970s with tracks such as "Jolly Bus-Ting" and "Engineers Affair". In 1978 his profile was raised further by his "Peace Truce" single, which celebrated the armistice between rival Political factions that would culminate in the One Love Peace Concert. The same year, Scorcher joined Nicodemus, Nigger Kojak, and Mother Liza on Prince Jammy's Tapetone sound system, which soon became Jamaica's top system. His first album, Rasta Fire, was also released on the United Artists offshoot Ballistic, on which he was backed by The Revolutionaries. In 1979 he had a hit with "Roach in a De Corner" (on the "Real Rock" rhythm), which was followed by the similar "Frog In a Water" (on the "My Conversation" rhythm), both songs appearing on his 1980 album Roach In A De Corner. He worked with Ansell Collins on a series off recordings including "Mosquitoes", which was also a hit. He also set up his own Scorcher label and began production work on both his own recordings and for artists such as Tony Tuff.

== Discography ==
=== Albums ===
- Rasta Fire (1978) United Artists/Ballistic
- Tony Tuff Meets Errol Scorcher (1978) Mal's (split with Tony Tuff)
- Roach In A De Corner (1980) Scorcher
- Unity Showcase (1980) 12 Stars (Horace Andy and Errol Scorcher)

=== Singles ===
- "Leggo Mi Hand Babylon"
- "Jolly Bus-Ting"
- "Engineers Affair"
- "Peace Truce" (1978)
- "Steppin" (1978) Ballistic
- "Roach In a De Corner" (1979) Sir Collins
- "Frog In A Water" (1979)
- "Girls Be Careful"/"Roach in the Toilet" (1980), Scorcher
- "Mosquitoes" (1980)
- "Sounds of Hon. Marley" (1980) Dance Hall
- "Rope In" Scorcher
- "Borrow Man" Scorcher
- "DJ Spirit" Scorcher
- "Scorcher Possie" (1981) Volcano
- "Under Me" (1981) Crazy Joe
- "Wife & Sweetheart" (1981) Techniques
- "Rude Boy Step"
- "Letting Go"
- "Prisoner In Love" (1983) Bridget International
