= Let the Power Fall =

Studio album by Max Romeo
- Released: 1971
- Studio: Dynamic Sounds, Kingston, Jamaica
- Genre: Reggae
- Label: Dynamic Sounds, Rhino
- Producer: Bunny Lee

Max Romeo chronology
A Dream (1969)	Let the Power Fall (1971)	Revelation Time (1975)

Let the Power Fall is the second studio album by Max Romeo, released in 1971. The album, in contrast to Romeo's debut A Dream, included politically charged material. It was engineered by Carlton Lee and Sid Bucknor.

== Track listing ==
All tracks composed by Max Romeo; except where noted.

Side A

1. "Let the Power Fall"
2. "Bachelor Boy" (The Shadows)
3. "Cracklin' Rosie" (Neil Diamond)
4. "Chatter Box" (Bob Marley)
5. "Missing You" (Adapted)

Side B

1. "Puppet on a String" (Adapted)
2. "My Special Prayer" (Joe Simon)
3. "Fowl Thief" (Max Romeo, Lloyd Clarke)
4. "Hola Zion"
5. "Macabee Version"

Bonus tracks

1. "Before the Next Tear Drop Falls"
2. "On the Beach"
3. "Nice Time"
4. "Thank You Lord"
5. "Nothing Takes the Place of You"

== Singles ==
- 1971: "Let the Power Fall"
- 1971: "Macabee Version"
