= Wet Dream (Max Romeo song) =

Single by Max Romeo

from the album A Dream
- B-side: "She's But a Little Girl"
- Released: 1968
- Genre: Reggae
- Length: 2:45
- Label: Unity Records, Pama Records
- Songwriter: Max Romeo
- Producers: Harry Robinson, Junior Smith

Max Romeo singles chronology
| "Wet Dream" (1968) | "Twelfth of Never" (1969) |

"Wet Dream" is a song by Jamaican reggae singer Max Romeo first released in 1968 on the Unity Records label. The song, with its controversial lyrics, remains Romeo's biggest commercial hit.

== Background ==
In 1968, Romeo wrote lyrics for the rhythm track of Derrick Morgan's "Hold You Jack". Morgan, who was due to add his vocals to the track, ultimately turned it down, as did several other vocalists (including John Holt and Slim Smith), leading the producer to turn to Romeo to sing the lyrics he had written. The result was "Wet Dream", produced by Harry Robinson and Junior Smith. Although the single was released in 1968, it did not start to sell until 1969. Already a hit in Jamaica, it entered the UK singles chart in May 1969 reaching number 10 as its highest position in August 1969.

The song gained notoriety due to its lyrics of an explicit sexual nature. Despite Romeo's claims that it was about a leaky roof, it contained the lyric "give the fanny to me" and was banned from broadcast by several radio stations. It was only played twice by the BBC before being banned. When it moved into the charts, BBC radio DJs Tony Brandon, Tony Blackburn, and Alan Freeman were instructed that they must only refer to the song as "a record by Max Romeo". Due to the ban by British radio, the song was re-titled "The Dream" in the Netherlands, where it peaked at number 11 in September 1969.

"Wet Dream" was released by Pama's Unity Records, ultimately becoming the biggest selling single of Pama's catalogue, having sold over 250,000 copies. The song was also included on Max Romeo's debut album, A Dream, released in 1969.

Interviewed in 2007, Romeo claimed to have started the sexual revolution. Asked why he had recorded the song, he replied: "The devil made me do it".

== Track listing ==
- 7" Single

A. "Wet Dream" – 2:45
B. "She's But a Little Girl" – 2:30

== Chart performance ==
| Chart (1969) | Peak position |
|---|---|
| Netherlands | 11 |
| United Kingdom | 10 |
