= Willi Williams =

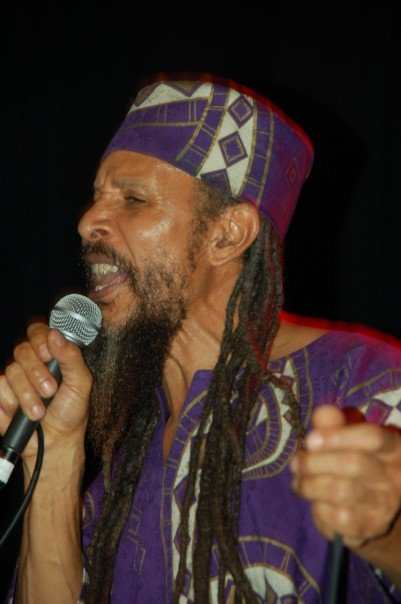
- Willi Williams performing at the 2007 Winnipeg Ska and Reggae Festival

Background information
- Born: 15 June 1953 (age 73); Saint Ann Parish, Jamaica
- Genres: Reggae, dub
- Occupations: Singer-songwriter, producer
- Years active: 1960s–present
- Labels: Studio One, Soul Sounds, Heartbeat, Black Star, Jah Shaka, Drum Street
- Website: williwilliams.com

Willi Williams (also Willie Williams) (born 15 June 1953) is a Jamaican reggae and dub musician and producer. He is known as the "Armagideon Man" after his hit, "Armagideon Time", first recorded in 1977 at Studio One in Kingston. The song was covered by The Clash as the flipside of their "London Calling" single.

== Biography ==
Williams was born in Saint Ann Parish, Jamaica. He attended Trenchtown Comprehensive High School, where he was a classmate of Sly Dunbar. He first recorded at Studio One in the late 1960s, while he was still in school. In 1967 he set up the "Tripletone" sound system and in 1969 started his own record label called Soul Sounds; among the artists he recorded were Delroy Wilson, The Versatiles and Rhythm Force (a pseudonym for The Wailers). He moved to Canada in 1974 and split his time between Toronto, Ontario and Kingston.

Williams worked with keyboardist Jackie Mittoo and producer Coxsone Dodd on "Armagideon Time", a single (and later the title track of a Studio One album) recorded over the "Real Rock" riddim. The song was covered by The Clash in 1979, and later featured in the film Ghost Dog: The Way of the Samurai and on the Grand Theft Auto: San Andreas soundtrack (is featured on the reggae radio station K-JAH Radio West but not on the soundtrack album). "Armagideon Time" is included on the four CD anthology Tougher Than Tough: The Story of Jamaican Music, which Mango Records released in 1993. In 1994, Kenny Ken, British jungle and drum and bass DJ and producer rose to prominence with his first big track "Everyman",which was built on a version of Willi Williams' and Coxsone Dodd's foundation one drop Armagideon Time Real Rock riddim, sampling the vocal from Errol Dunkley's song, Little Way Different. The song was also sampled by The Fugees in 1996 on their track "Zealots".

In 2007, the rock band Gov't Mule adapted and recorded Williams' composition "Natty with a Cause" as "Rebel with a Cause", which features Williams' voice along with that of Gov't Mule singer Warren Haynes. The reggae-punk band Sublime used some lyrics from the song "Armagideon Time", as well as the bass line, for the song "Sweet Little Rosie". As of 2007, Willi was working on an album with an up-and-coming Toronto artist named Visionary.

On 14 August 2014, Shanachie Records announced their plans to release a Willi Williams/Yabby You project titled Unification: From Channel One to King Tubbys with Willi Williams and Yabby You, which includes tracks recorded in the late 1970s and never released. According to label chief Randall Grass, the album was recorded between 1978 and 1980 at both Channel One Studios and King Tubby's studio, utilizing musicians including Sly and Robbie and the Revolutionaries, Soul Syndicate, The Gladiators, Jackie Mittoo, Bobby Ellis, Cedric Brooks and Bobby Kalphat.

In a September 2014 interview with Midnight Raver, Williams revealed that the Uptempo and Smugg record labels have been copying his music without permission and releasing it on compilation albums. Specifically, he stated that the One Love compilation released by Smugg Records in 2012 is an unauthorized record as well as the Roots and Culture (1984, Uptempo) [with Barry Brown] album released in the early 1980s by the Uptempo label.

In 2019, after a three-year hiatus due to a knee injury, Williams began a musical collaboration with the electronic musician New Chance. The project is intended to bring two communities together as an act of kinship and political solidarity.

== Album discography ==
- Messenger Man (1980, Drum Street) [re-released 2005 with extra tracks]
- Armagideon Time (1982, Coxsone) [reissued 1992]
- Roots and Culture (1984, Uptempo) [with Barry Brown]
- Unity (1987, Black Star)
- Natty with a Cause (1992, Jah Shaka)
- See Me (1993, Jah Shaka)
- Jah Will (1994, Drum Street)
- Thanks & Devotion (1998, Drum Street)
- Full Time Love (2002, Drum Street)
- Di Real Rock (2007)
- Mighty High (2007)
- Reggae Can't Done (2013)
- Glory to the King (2020)

== Compilations ==
- From Studio One to Drum Street (M10)
- From Studio One to Drum Street, Vol 2 (Drum Street)
