= The Four Aces Club =

Music and recreational space in Hackney, London

- The Four Aces, Dalston
- Interactive map of The Four Aces Club
- Location: Dalston, London, England
- Coordinates: 51.5460°N 0.0741°W
- Events: Reggae, dub, lovers rock (as The Four Aces); House, breakbeat hardcore, jungle (as The Labrynth)

Construction
- Opened: 1966
- Closed: 1997 (as The Labrynth)
- Demolished: 2007

The Four Aces Club was a pioneering music and recreational space on Dalston Lane in Dalston, London. Based in a building that had formerly been the North London Colosseum and Amphitheatre and then a cinema, in the 1960s and 1970s the club became one of the first venues to play black music in the United Kingdom. It was credited with playing a significant "role in the evolution of reggae into dance music, from ska, to rocksteady, to dub, to lovers, to dancehall and the evolution of jungle." Many notable Afro-Caribbean musicians appeared at the Four Aces, which was often referred to as "the jewel in Dalston's crown". As well as reggae and dub artists, its clientele over the years including stars such as Bob Marley, Stevie Wonder and Jimmy Cliff.

In the early 1990s, it became home to the early indoor "rave scene" featuring acid house and hardcore under the name Club Labrynth, where The Prodigy made their first live public appearance. The club was closed down in 1997, when Hackney Council exercised the right to a compulsory re-possession of the premises. Despite an active campaign to save the building it was demolished in 2007. It made way for four residential tower blocks, in the new Dalston Square development, with the new Dalston Junction overground railway station aligning with urban regeneration plans for East London in the build-up to the 2012 Olympics.

== History ==
The Four Aces Club was set up in 1966 by the Jamaican music producer Charlie Collins (Sir Collins) and Newton Dunbar, to provide a live music venue catering for people from the West Indies. It at first operated from a run-down basement in Highbury Grove, but as growing crowds were attracted, a larger space was soon required, and The Four Aces relocated to 12 Dalston Lane in Dalston in Hackney. The disused Victorian theatre was originally built to house Robert Fossett's Circus in 1886 It was known as the North London Colosseum and Amphitheatre and elephants performed alongside acrobats and jugglers. It had then become a cinema before being used for storage.

According to one description, "this multistoreyed, multi-roomed, Victorian-built hulk was labyrinthine – a reggae centre as if concocted in the mind of Jorge Luis Borges." It was the first club to open in Hackney, and "quickly became a meeting point for newly arrived Afro-Caribbean immigrants experiencing cultural exile". By the 1970s, West Indians not only from other parts of London but from all around the UK were flocking to the club. The police took an interest and the club was regularly raided. Dunbar was prosecuted 14 times by the police but never convicted.

The Four Aces was born when black music had not yet been accepted into the mainstream. It provided a home for black artists at a time when there were no black radio stations and few black stars in the UK. Dunbar showcased up-and-coming reggae artists and later hosted legendary sound clashes and sound systems.

— Sophie Lewis, "Glory daze: Remembering Club Labrynth and the Four Aces", The Dalstonist

Both local musicians and top international artists played and sang at the Four Aces Club, among them: Desmond Dekker, Jimmy Cliff, Roy Shirley, Alton Ellis, Prince Buster, the Upsetters, Ann Peebles, Percy Sledge, Ben E. King, Jimmy Ruffin, Billy Ocean, the Ronettes and many others.

Among the influential sound systems were Count Shelly, Fat Man, Jah Shaka and Sir Coxsone, with DJs vying to play at the Four Aces. In its heyday it was visited by the likes of Chrissie Hynde, Bob Marley Mick Jagger, The Clash, Johnny Rotten, The Slits, Joe Strummer, and Bob Dylan.

== Club Labrynth ==
Labrynth was founded by Joe Wieczorek and originally hosted illegal warehouse rave parties during 1988 and 1989 at the height of the acid house scene. As it became increasingly difficult to secure warehouse space, Wieczorek started to look into using licensed premises for parties. Dunbar handed over control of the club to Wieczorek, and in early 1990 Club Labrynth was born. Through the 1990s the musical styles progressed from house through hardcore and finally onto jungle and drum and bass. The resident DJs were Adrian Age, Vinyl Matt, Kenny Ken, and Billy 'Daniel' Bunter. The Prodigy played their first live show at the club. When the Four Aces closed down, the club moved to Tottenham.

== Demolition ==
The club was closed in 1997 and eventually Hackney Council (which had bought the building from Tesco for £1.8million in 1977) exercised the right to a compulsory re-possession of the premises. A petition of 25,000 signatures was made asking for the building to be preserved. It was squatted but the campaign to return the space to community use was unsuccessful. Despite objections from the Theatres Trust, the Georgian Group and the Cinema Theatre Association, the building was demolished in 2007. The cutting down of trees planted in the club's garden in memory of the young people who perished in the New Cross fire – widely believed to have been a racist arson attack – preceded the building's demolition.

Subsequent campaigns took place putting pressure on the council "to prevent the eradication of monuments which hold the memory of Black history and the story of multi-racial political solidarity in the borough", in particular the successful petition to retain the name of C. L. R. James on the relocated Dalston library. This resulted in the new library on the redeveloped site being opened as the "Dalston C.L.R. James Library" in 2012.

== Legacy ==
The club is the subject of a 2008 documentary film by Winstan Whitter, whose father was a barman and chef at the venue. Entitled Legacy in the Dust: The Four Aces Story, the film uses stock footage and images shot by Whitter at club nights to trace the musical evolution of the Four Aces. Whitter screened the film at the British Film Institute, venues in Dalston and various festivals but the cost of archive footage prevents a general release.

The club was "reincarnated" for one night at the Hackney Empire to celebrate the end of their Rudy's Rare Records show, starring Lenny Henry and based on the successful BBC Radio 4 show of the same name.

A campaign was launched in 2015 for a commemorative blue plaque to mark the former site of the club.

Memorial plaques in Dalston Square, for people associated with The Four Aces, 2025.

A luxury development of 550 apartments was built on the site. The five blocks are named Labyrinth Tower, Dunbar Tower, Marley House, Wonder House, and Collins Tower (named for co-founder Sir Collins, the tower houses the CLR James Library). Newton Dunbar commented: "They called it Dunbar Tower without consulting me [...] the demolition of The Four Aces laid down the roots for the subsequent gentrification of Dalston".

On 13 October 2025 a Sir Collins Legacy Honours event was held at Dalston Square to celebrate the cultural contributions made by several individuals (including Sir Collins) associated with The Four Aces and the nearby Cubies club. The event included the unveiling of several engraved stones in the square.
