= Jackie Opel =

Barbadian musician

- Born: Dalton Sinclair Bishop; August 27, 1937; Bridgetown, Barbados
- Died: March 9, 1970 (aged 32); Bridgetown, Barbados
- Years active: 1962-1970

Dalton Sinclair Bishop (27 August 1937 – 9 March 1970), better known as Jackie Opel, was a Barbadian singer who possessed a rich, powerful voice with a high octave range. He was known as the "Jackie Wilson of Barbadian culture" and was also a gifted dancer. Bishop was born in Bridgetown, Barbados.

In the early 1960s, he was discovered by Byron Lee, the band master of the Dragonaires, who brought him to Jamaica. His styles included ska, R&B, soul, gospel and calypso. He is credited with inventing spouge music, a fusion of ska, calypso, and R&B music. Opel performed duos with Doreen Shaffer and Hortense Ellis, and in 1964 was backed by Wailers Bob Marley and Peter Tosh on "Mill Man", "Hairy Mango" and "A Time to Cry".

Jackie’s height was about 5’3-5’4, and he was pigeon-toed. He was known as a great stage performer who could dance as well as James Brown.

Opel eventually moved to Trinidad and then subsequently returned home to Barbados. On 9 March, 1970, he died in a car crash on Lower Bay Street, Bridgetown, Barbados.

The night Jackie died he had just performed at Island Inn hotel, and US music executives attending had inquired if Jackie had recordings or tapes. Jackie went home to get the recordings, but on his way back to the Island Inn, a woman who was driving fast hit the edge of a pillar sticking out in the bend. Jackie was ejected head-first into a triangular wire fence and onto the concrete steps of Harry's Nightery.

Jackie was singing with the Troubadours at the time of his death, and the group played music at his funeral, held at St. Mary's Church in Bridgetown.

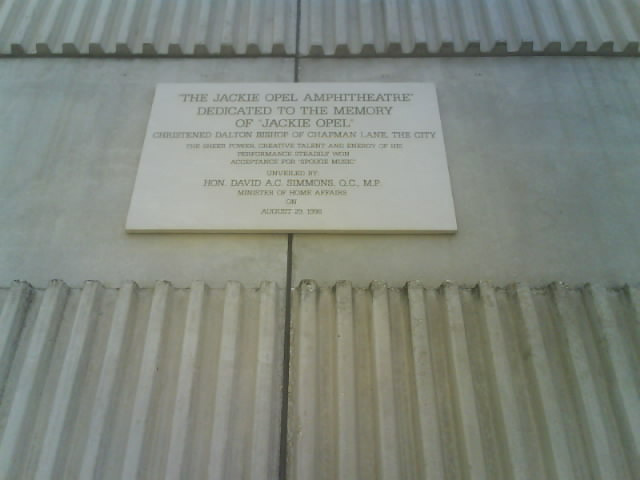
Commemoration plaque at the Jackie Opel Amphitheatre

== Discography (selected) ==
=== United States ===
- You Gotta Cry / Shelter The Storm ~ MGM K13391 (1965)

Note: ‘You Gotta Cry’ is actually in fact ‘Cry Me A River’ renamed to avoid confusion with the Julie London standard.

=== United Kingdom ===
- TV in Jamaica / Worrell's Captaincy ~ Jump Up 512 (1963)
- "You're No Good" / King Liges ~ Black Swan 421 (1964)
- Stand by Me (with Hortense Ellis) / Solid Rock ~ R & B 138 (1964)
- Pity The Fool / The Day Will Come ~ R & B 160 (1964)
- Cry Me A River / Eternal Love ~ King 1011 (1964)
- Wipe Those Tears / Don't Take Your Love ~ Island 203 (1965)
- Go Whey / Shelter In The Storm ~ Island 209 (1965)
- Old Rocking Chair / Ska In Vienna Woods (by Skatalites) ~ Island 229 (1965)
- Done With A Friend / More Wood In The Fire ~ Ska Beat 190 (1965)
- The Lord Is with Thee / A Little More ~ Ska Beat 227 (1965)
- Welcome Home / You & I (with Doreen Schaeffer) ~ Ska Beat 208 (1965)
- Adorable You / New Vow (with Doreen Schaeffer) ~ Ska Beat 209 (1965)
- A Love To Share / Devoted To You ~ Island 264 (1966)
- I Am What I am / Devil's Bug ~ Rio 117 (1966)
- I Don't Want Her / Rudie Get Wise ~ Rio 120 (1967)
- Valley of Green / Hungry Man (by The Deacons) ~ Top Deck 101 (1990?)

=== Compact disc ===
- "The Best Of Jackie Opel" (Studio One)
- "Cry Me A River" (Studio One)
- "A Love To Share: Top Sounds From Top Deck, Vol. 2" (Westside) Split release with Ferdie Nelson
- "The Memorable Jackie Opel" (Select-O-Hits) Spouge recordings

=== Compilations ===
- The Vow (with Doreen Schaffer) & Old Rocking Chair from "Foundation Ska" (Heartbeat)
- Push Wood & Sit Down Servant from "Ska Bonanza: The Studio One Years" (Heartbeat) Later reissued as "Go Ska Go" (Heartbeat)
- You Send Me from "Gaz Mayall Top! Ska Tunes" (Trojan)
- Push Wood from "It's Ska Time: 20 original Ska Classics" (Charly)
- The Mill Man & A Time To Cry (both backed by The Wailers) from "Wailers & Friends: Top Hits Sung By The Legends of Jamaican Ska" (Heartbeat)
- I Am What I Am, Done With A Friend & The Lord Is With Me from "I Am Going Home: 25 Classic Ska Shots" (bootleg)
- Pictures Of Smoke from "Ska-ntastic: Vintage Jamaican Ska 1963-66" (Richmond)
- You're Too Bad from "Studio One Rude Boy" (Soul Jazz)
- I Love Jamaica from "Trojan Jamaica Box Set" (Trojan)
- Tears From My Eyes from "Ska Non Stop: Top Sounds From Top Deck, Vol. 8" (Westside)
- Turn To The Almighty (Take 1), Turn To The Almighty (Take 2) & Sometimes I Wonder from "Ska Down Jamaica Way: Ska Boo Da Ba, Vol. 2" (WSM)

== Legacy ==
- An amphitheatre at the centre of the Barbados General Post Office was commemorated in Opel's name.
