= The African Brothers =

Jamaican reggae vocal trio

- Origin: Kingston, Jamaica
- Genres: Reggae
- Years active: 1969–Mid-1970s, 2004
- Labels: Studio One, Micron, Easy Star, Discograph
- Past members: Sugar Minott; Tony Tuff; Derrick Howard; Triston Palmer; Ken Bob

The African Brothers were a Jamaican reggae vocal trio formed by three Kingston teenagers – Lincoln "Sugar" Minott, Winston "Tony Tuff" Morris, and Derrick "Bubbles" Howard.

== History ==
The three singers met in 1969 when "Bubbles" overheard "Sugar" Minott singing along to "Tony Tuff" playing the guitar. They formed a group, with early influences including The Abyssinians, The Heptones, and The Gaylads, the name the African Brothers a reference to their African heritage. Morris was initially the main songwriter, being the most experienced member of the group, with Minott and Howard contributing harmony vocals. They first recorded in 1970 for producer Rupie Edwards, for whom they recorded "Mysterious Nature", and they also recorded for Clement "Coxsone" Dodd ("No Cup No Broke"), Winston Blake, Duke Thelwell ("Party Night"), and Mike Johnson and Ronnie Burke at Micron Music. They followed these with self-productions, including "Torturing", "Want Some Freedom", and "Practice What You Preach", several released on their own Ital label. In the mid-1970s, the group split up, with Minott going on to work at Studio One before launching a successful solo career, Tony Tuff also becoming a successful solo artist. Howard moved into production.

The US label Easy Star released the album Want Some Freedom in 2001, comprising recordings from between 1970 and 1978. Minott and Tuff reformed the group for a 2004 album, Mysterious Nature, also featuring Triston Palma and Ken Bob.

== Discography ==
- Collector's Item (1987), Uptempo – credited to Sugar Minott & The African Brothers, split between Minott solo and group material
- Want Some Freedom (2001), Easy Star
- Mysterious Nature (2004), Discograph
- The African Brothers Meet King Tubby in Dub (2005), Nature Sounds
