= Doreen Shaffer =

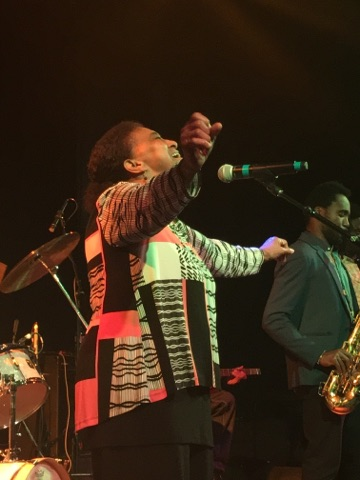
- Shaffer performing in 2016

Background information
- Born: Monica Johnson; Kingston, Jamaica
- Genres: Ska, rocksteady, reggae
- Years active: 1963–present
- Member of: The Skatalites

Monica Johnson, better known by her stage name Doreen Shaffer (sometimes spelled Schaffer or Schaeffer), is a Jamaican ska, rocksteady, and reggae singer. Known as the "Queen of Ska", she was a founding member in 1964 of the Skatalites. Following the death of Skatalites member Lester Sterling on 16 May 2023, Shaffer is now the last surviving founding member of the Skatalites.

== Career ==
Johnson was born in Kingston, Jamaica in the early 1940s to a German father and Costa Rican mother.

She started singing at school, initially inspired by jazz singers such as Dinah Washington and Sarah Vaughan. She began her career at Studio One, recording duets with Jackie Opel, before they both joined the Skatalites in 1964.

After the Skatalites disbanded in 1965, Shaffer continued as a solo singer. A collection of her recordings for producer Bunny Lee, First Lady of Reggae, was released in 1970. She had local success in the 1970s with singles "Sugar Sugar" and "Try a Little Smile". In 1979 she released an album with Naomi Phillips, and in 1986 recorded her debut album proper, Wonderful Sounds. She was part of the re-forming of the Skatalites in 1992. Another solo album, Adorable, followed in 1997. In 2009 she collaborated with the Moon Invaders on the album Groovin'. In 2012, she recorded lead vocals on "Love Is the Way" for the Skatalites' studio album Walk With Me. She performed with the re-formed Skatalites from 1992 until the COVID-19 pandemic began in 2020.

== Discography ==
- First Lady of Reggae (1970), Pama
- Read Me Right (1979), Nationwide - Doreen Schaffer & Naomi Phillips
- Wonderful Sounds (1986), Revue/Spiderman - also released as Sugar Sugar
- Adorable (1997), Grover
- Adorable You (2002), Studio One
- Groovin' (2009), Grover - Doreen Schaffer with The Moon Invaders
