= OK Fred =

Reggae song

Single by John Holt
- B-side: "Jamaica Bag"
- Released: 1971
- Genre: Reggae
- Label: Studio One
- Songwriter: John Holt
- Producer: Coxsone Dodd

"OK Fred"

Single by Errol Dunkley
- B-side: "OK Fred (instrumental version)"
- Released: 1979
- Genre: Reggae
- Label: Scope
- Songwriter: John Holt
- Producer: Ossie Hibbert

"OK Fred" is a song by Jamaican singer-songwriter John Holt. It was first released as a single in 1971.

== Background ==
Errol Dunkley stated that the song is about an up-town girl who falls for a down-town guy who is a non-conformist in the way he dresses and wants to become care-free like him. Jamaican parents might tell their unkempt children, "Fix up youself, put you shirt in you trousers, you look like a yaga yaga". AllMusic gave a different version, saying the song describes the singer's prowess and technique with the opposite sex. The song is considered a cross over hit due to being by a Jamaican artist but appealing to a white audience.

Holt's version features Vin Gordon on trombone. It was produced by Coxsone Dodd. The song was covered with greater chart success by Dunkley.

== Chart success ==
Holt's version did not chart in the UK. Dunkley's version reached No. 11 on the UK Singles Chart in 1979, staying on the chart for 11 weeks.
