= Kenny Ken =

- Born: Ken Delsol; 1959 (age 66–67)
- Origin: London, England
- Genres: Jungle, drum and bass
- Occupations: DJ, record producer
- Years active: 1989–present
- Labels: Mix & Blen', Planet Funk Recordings

Ken Delsol, better known as Kenny Ken, is a British jungle and drum and bass DJ and producer.

== Biography ==
Kenny was working for London Transport when his first big break came around in 1989 as a result of him being a regular attendee at Crazy Larry's, an early Sunday morning rave. The organizers also promoted the Crazy Club at Busby's, where Kenny became resident DJ alongside Ray Keith and Jumpin Jack Frost. One of his first times playing out was at Labrynth, previously known as The Four Aces Club, renowned for its Jah Shaka and Lloyd Coxsone residencies and sessions. Kenny would also play on the pirate radio station Centreforce.

He would soon become resident DJ at London nights, Sunday Roast, Telepathy, World Dance, AWOL, and in 1994 won the inaugural Jungle Sound Clash event.

He rose to prominence with his first big track "Everyman" in 1994, then proceeded to launch his Mix & Blen' label in 1997, followed by Planet Funk Recordings, co-owned with DJ Mace."Everyman" was built on a version of Willi Williams' and Coxsone Dodd's foundation one drop Armagideon Time Real Rock riddim, and a vocal take on Errol Dunkley's song, Little Way Different.

He was the guest DJ on Radio 1's Simon Bates' show in 1991, when the Pet Shop Boys stood in for 1 week only.

Between 1994 and 1997, Kenny had a show on London's Kiss 100. He also appeared on the BBC Radio 1 One in the Jungle show in 1995.

His stepson is drum and bass DJ and producer Crissy Criss.

== Discography ==
=== Singles & EPs ===
- Everybody's Friend (1993)
- DJ Monk & Kenny Ken - Good Body Girl / Ooh Yeah (Remixes) (1994)
- D.R.S. Featuring Kenny Ken - Everyman (1994)
- Kenny Ken & Cool Breeze - Cool Groove / Ice Cold (12") (1995)
- Kenny Ken & Cool Breeze - So Much Trouble (1996)
- Mace & Kenny Ken - Reminiscence / Clap To This (1997)
- Project One / Watertight (1998)
- Everyman Remixes (2001)
- Vinyl Syndicate, Kenny Ken & G Squad - Temptation Remix / The Joint Remix (12") (2001)
- Sappo vs. Kenny Ken - Wheel Up Rmxs Part 1 (2002)
- Drum & Bass Souljah (2003)
- Ragga Rave / Everyman (Digital Remix) (2004)
- Murder You (2006)
- Clipz, Kenny Ken - Number One (Unreleased Kenny Ken Special) / Murder You (12") (2006)
- Everyman (Remixes) (2007)
- Urban Shakedown & Kenny Ken - The Champ (Unreleased) / Clap To This (10")
- Everyman (10")
- Twisted Individual & Kenny Ken - Wales Remix / Clap To This (A-Sides Remix) (10")
- Digital & Kenny Ken - Spacefunk 2000 (Nasty Habits Remix) / Bank 67 (10")
- D.R.S. Featuring Kenny Ken & Roni Size - Everyman VIP / Physical (Remix) (10")
- High Contrast & Kenny Ken - Gives Me Money to Buy My Weed / Untitled (12")

=== Mix compilations ===
- Kenny Ken & DJ SS - World Dance - The Album (1997)
- Rat Pack & Kenny Ken - Absolute Old Skool Classics (2001)
- Mix & Blen' Selection (2001)
- Kenny Ken - 25 Years of Kenny Ken (2014)
