= Sugar Minott =

Jamaican reggae singer (1956–2010)

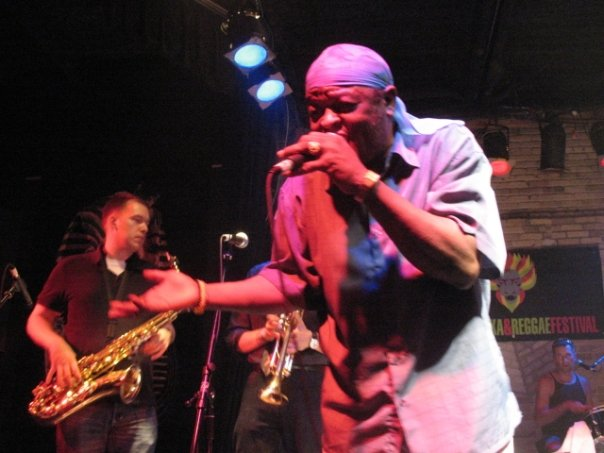
- Minott performing at the 2008 Winnipeg Ska and Reggae Festival with JFK & The Conspirators

Background information
- Born: Lincoln Barrington Minott; 25 May 1956
- Died: 10 July 2010 (aged 54) Saint Andrew Parish, Jamaica
- Genres: Reggae, dancehall
- Occupations: Singer, record producer, sound-system operator
- Years active: 1969–2010
- Website: sugarminott.com

Lincoln Barrington "Sugar" Minott (25 May 1956 – 10 July 2010) was a Jamaican reggae and dancehall singer, record producer and sound-system operator.

== Biography ==
After working as a selector on the Sound of Silence Keystone sound system, and then his own Gathering of Youth system, he began his singing career as part of The African Brothers in 1969, along with Tony Tuff and Derrick Howard. The group released several singles in the first half of the 1970s on labels such as Micron and their own Ital label, and were an early example of the Rastafari movement's influence on the Jamaican music scene, taking a clear lead from The Abyssinians. After recording "Mysterious Nature" for producer Rupie Edwards, the group recorded 1974's "No Cup No Broke" for Studio One, breaking up shortly after. Minott then teamed up with the producer Clement "Coxsone" Dodd, as studio apprentice at Dodd's Studio One, working as a singer, guitarist and percussionist, and soon began recording his own singles. Minott developed a talent for writing new songs to fit over existing rhythms (which at the time was common when singers performed live, but rare in the studio), often proving more popular than the original songs, pioneering an approach that would be central to the emerging dancehall style.

After a number of moderately successful hits for Studio One, such as "Vanity", "Hang On Natty", "Mr. DC", and "Jah Jah Children", his debut LP Live Loving made his name and increased his popularity, and is regarded as pioneering the dancehall style that would dominate the early 1980s. It was followed in 1979 with a second album, Showcase, which included his singles that had been omitted from the first album.

The Bittersweet album followed, and then the third album of 1979, Ghetto-ology, which saw a return to roots reggae. Roots Lovers (1980) saw a move towards lovers rock, which was a UK hit. He became a bigger star in the UK than in Jamaica, his self-produced "Hard Time Pressure" being a major UK reggae hit in 1980, leading Minott to relocate to the UK, where he became a focus for UK reggae.

Singles such as "Run Come", "Not for Sale", "African Girl", "Lovers Rock", "In a Dis Ya Time", "Africa" and "Make It with You" (with Carroll Thompson) were hits in the years that followed. "Good Thing Going" (a cover of a song originally recorded by Michael Jackson in 1971) was picked up for distribution by RCA and reached Number 4 in the UK Singles Chart in March 1981, leading to an album of the same name. The Herbman Hustling album saw a return to dancehall and roots reggae.

He released an album of recordings from Channel One Studios, With Lots Of Extra in 1983, collecting several hits from his time working with Winston Holness.

Returning to Jamaica, his Youth Promotion sound system performed regularly in Kingston's Maxfield Park, featuring Jah Stitch and newcomers who had been nurtured by his organization such as Ranking Joe, Captain Sinbad, and Ranking Dread. His Black Roots label featured his productions of these artists plus others such as Barry Brown, Tenor Saw, Little John, Tony Tuff, Barrington Levy, Horace Andy, and one of his discoveries from England, Trevor Hartley. Minott also produced early works by Nitty Gritty, Junior Reid, Yami Bolo, Colourman, Daddy Freddy and Garnett Silk.

In 1980s he was working with producers in Jamaica including, Mikey Dread, George Phang, Sly and Robbie, Philip "Fatis" Burrell, Channel One, Prince Jammy, and Donovan Germain, as well as recording for United States–based Lloyd "Bullwackie" Barnes (the Wicked A Go feel It album from 1984). His biggest hits included "Herbman Hustling", "No Vacancy", "Jamming in the Street", "Rub A Dub Sound", "Buy Off The Bar", "Rydim", and "Devil's Pickney".

He linked up with Sly and Robbie for 1984's "Rub a Dub Sound Style" single, which is regarded as a prototype for the ragga style that developed in the mid-1980s. Sugar Minott continued to record on his Black Roots label, Youth Promotion Label and for Major and Independent labels. His albums receive increasingly exciting reviews. He released over 100 albums and hundreds of singles. He is one of the artists who appeared on the (2006) record, Radiodread, released by the Easy Star label, providing the guest vocals on the song "Exit Music (For a Film)".

Minott's desire for independence led him to leave Studio One in 1978 and form his own Black Roots Records label and Youth Promotion organization, the latter with the aim of helping young singers from the same ghetto background as himself. Minott also ran the Youthman Promotion sound-system, giving young performers their first public exposure. Youthman Promotion has new selectors working alongside the veterans of Major Stitch, Ragga Steve and Drifter, Daddy Ants, Mr Shorty and Jimmy Knuckles. The selectors most recently added to the sound are DiGeneral Starry B in 2007, alongside Poochiny and Jr War, who were added in 2012. Ragga Steve has taken full control of the sound with Earl Simms in the UK.

Minott married music executive Maxine Stowe, niece of Clement Coxsone Dodd in 1993, she was then working at Columbia Records. They met At Coxsone’s Music City in Brooklyn, New York in 1978, where they collaborated and produced the album Roots Lovers. Sugar has 15 children with one, Alton Barrington his first child, predeceasing him. The other children are Tamar Pashon, Lincoln Jr., Ashanty, Rachiim, Daniel, Jahson, Kelly Ann, Andrew, Cheina, Candice, Linval, Tamar, Osunya and Roshawn

== Death ==
Minott died on 10 July 2010 at the University Hospital of the West Indies in St. Andrew Parish, Jamaica, after being admitted earlier that day. The cause of death remains undisclosed. He had been affected by a heart condition since early 2009, and cancelled several performances in May 2010 due to chest pains.

He is survived by his widow Maxine Stowe and 14 children, grandchildren, brothers, and sisters.

On May 25, 2012, a concert Sugar Minott Day Tribute was held by his big daughter Pashon at his former home commemorating his birthday, with Minott's children (who include daughter Tamar, aka Pashon) joined by Bounty Killer, Sizzla, Beenie Man, Junior Reid, Ken Boothe and John Holt. Proceeds went to the Youthman Promotions Music Centre and other causes helping local poor people.

In 2019, he was honoured with a Reggae Gold award by the Jamaican government for his contributions as artist and producer.

== Discography ==
- Live Loving (1977, Studio One) Roots Archives states 1977, Discogs says release year is unknown
- Showcase (1978, Studio One, probably a smaller edition in Jamaica by Studio One already 1977,); reissued in US as Showcase (1992, Heartbeat) with different mixing; reissued as Jah Jah Children 2012
- Black Roots (1979, Black Roots Records & Gorgon Records in Jamaica; 1979 by Mango for US and 1980 by Island Records for UK and (Germany) with other, shorter names on the 10 songs). The LP-album Black Roots, released for the Jamaican market on Black Roots Records, Gorgon Records and Thunder Bolt is dated 1978, so the album is recorded before the year 1979.
- Bittersweet (1979, Gorgon Records in Jamaica; Warrior Records in UK); also released as Give The People (1979, United Artists Records) in UK
- Ghetto – Ology (1979, Trojan) – reissued as Ghetto-ology + Dub (2000, Easy Star Records in US)
- Roots Lovers (1980, Black Roots); in Jamaica also released as Music for the Roots Lovers (1980?, Black Roots) with Sugar Minott & Black Roots Players
- African Girl (1981, Black Roots); pre-release album was produced and released 1980
- Sweeter Than Sugar (1981, Sonic Sounds for Jamaica, Hummingbird Records for US and UK)
- Good Thing Going (1981, RCA for UK); (1982 Heartbeat for US); Re-issued with smaller edits as Good Thing Going (1994, Black Roots Records)
- More Sugar Minott (1982, Studio One) – released on Jamaica
- Dancehall Showcase (1983, Black Roots)
- With Lots Of Extra (1983, Hitbound)
- Herbman Hustling (1984, Black Roots)
- Slice of the Cake (1984, Black Roots)
- Wicked a Go Feel It (1984, Wackies)
- Leader for the Pack (1985, Striker Lee)
- Rydim (1985, Greensleeves)
- Time Longer Than Rope (1985, Greensleeves)
- Inna Reggae Dance Hall (1986, Black Roots)
- Sugar & Spice (1986, Taxi)
- Jamming in the Streets (1987, Wackies)
- African Soldier (1988, Black Roots)
- Buy Off De Bar (1988, Sonic Sounds)
- Sugar Minott & Youth Promotion (1988, NEC)
- Lovers Rock Inna Dance Hall (1988, Youth Promotion)
- Sufferers Choice (1988, Black Roots)
- Ghetto Youth Dem Rising (1988, Black Roots)
- The Boss Is Back (1989, RAS)
- Ghetto Child (1989, Black Roots)
- Smile (1990, L&M)
- A Touch of Class (1991, Jammy's)
- Happy Together (1991, Black Roots)
- Run Things (1993, VP)
- Breaking Free (1994, RAS)
- Stir it Up (feat. Daddy Freddy) (1994, Music of Life)
- International (1996, RAS)
- Musical Murder (1997, VP)
- Good Thing Going (1998, VP)
- Easy Squeeze (1999, World)
- Simply the Best (2000), World
- From the Heart (2000), Blackwacks
- Leave Out a Babylon (2005), Discograph
- In A Lovers Roots Style (2008), Pinnacle
- Tribute to Studio One (2009), Tad's
- New Day (2009), Stop Look Listen

Split albums

- Rockers Award Winners (1985, Greensleeves) (Sugar Minott and Leroy Smart)
- Double Dose (1987, Blue Mountain) (Sugar Minott and Gregory Isaacs)
- Showdown Volume 2 (Channel One) (Sugar Minott and Frankie Paul)

Compilations

- With Lots of Extra (1983, Hitbound)
- Best of Vol 1 (1988, Black Roots)
- Collectors Collection Vol 1 (1996, Black Roots)
- RAS Portrait (1997, RAS)
- Sugar Minott's Hidden Treasures (1999, Easy Star)
- Hard Time Pressure: Reggae Anthology (2011, VP Records)

With the African Brothers
