= Chase the Devil =

Single by Max Romeo and the Upsetters

from the album War Ina Babylon
- Released: 1976
- Genre: Reggae; dub
- Length: 3:25
- Label: Island
- Songwriters: Lee "Scratch" Perry; Max Romeo
- Producers: Lee "Scratch" Perry; Max Romeo

Max Romeo and the Upsetters singles chronology
"Hola Zion" (1976)	"Chase the Devil" (1976)	"Mr. Jones" (1976)

"Chase the Devil" is a reggae song, recorded in 1976 by Max Romeo, with the backing of Lee "Scratch" Perry's house band, the Upsetters.

== Background ==
Composed by Perry and Romeo, "Chase the Devil" was released on the album War Ina Babylon in 1976. Also in 1976, The Upsetters recorded a version with different lyrics. The track, called "Croaking Lizard" and credited to The Upsetters and Prince Jazzbo, was included in their album Super Ape. Later, Perry made a dub remix of both versions, called "Disco Devil".

In a BBC interview recorded in 2010, Romeo describes the meaning of the song. He explains that the devil is everything negative in our minds, the iron shirt is our strength of spirit that allows us to cast out the devil.

== Track listings ==
- 7" UK single

A. Max Romeo – "Chase the Devil"
B. The Upsetters featuring Prince Jazzbo – "Croaking Lizard"

- 7" French single

A. "Chase the Devil" – 3:25
B. "One Step Forward (Oye Oye Reggae)" – 5:00

== Cover versions and sampling ==
- The song was sampled in "Out of Space" by the Prodigy (1992).
- Kanye West used resung samples from "Chase the Devil" to produce Jay Z's song "Lucifer", which appeared on Jay Z's 2003 release, The Black Album.
- Madness covered the song for their cover album The Dangermen Sessions Vol. 1, released in 2005.
- Dreadzone sampled the song for their 2006 track "Iron Shirt".
- Earl Sixteen covered the song in 2008. Other reggae acts who have recorded their own versions include Macka B, Susan Cadogan and Mad Professor.

== Use in media ==
The song was featured in the 2004 video game Grand Theft Auto: San Andreas on its fictional reggae radio station K-JAH West.

The "Disco Devil" remix was featured in the 2013 video game Grand Theft Auto V on its fictional reggae radio station The Blue Ark.
