= Real Rock =

Single by Sound Dimension
- Released: 1968
- Recorded: 1967
- Studio: Jamaica Recording Studio (Kingston, Jamaica)
- Genre: Riddim; reggae; rocksteady
- Label: Studio One
- Songwriter: Clement "Coxsone" Dodd
- Producer: Clement "Coxsone" Dodd

"Real Rock" is an instrumental reggae song by the Jamaican band Sound Dimension. It was recorded in 1967 at Jamaica Recording Studio in Kingston, Jamaica, and released as a single in 1968 by Studio One. The song was produced by Clement "Coxsone" Dodd and performed by Eric Frater (guitar), Boris Gardiner (bass guitar), Phil Callender (drums), Denzel Laing (percussion), Vin Gordon (trombone) and Jackie Mittoo (keyboards), who played the riddim's signature three-note Hammond organ figure.

The song is significant for giving rise to perhaps the most popular reggae riddim of all time, having been versioned hundreds of times by artists including The Clash, KRS-One and 311. According to a 2004 The New York Times article, C. Dodd considered the song his crowning achievement.

== Partial list of songs using the "Real Rock" riddim ==
- "Real Rock", Sound Dimension (1967)
- "Rockers' Rock", Augustus Pablo (1973)
- "Fly Away", Vin Gordon-The Upsetters ( 1975 )
- "Cool Out Son", Junior Murvin (1978)
- "Friday Evening", Joe Tex & U Black (1978)
- "Stop The Fussing & Fighting", Dennis Brown (1978)
- "Together Brothers", Dennis Brown (1979)
- "If I Wasn't a Man" Discomix , Horace Andy / Headley Bennett ( 1979 )
- "Jah provide" Discomix , Horace Andy / Headley Bennett ( 1979 )
- "Looking My Love" Discomix , Barrington Levy ( 1979 )
- "Money Makes Friends" Discomix , Barrington Levy ( 1979 )
- "Nice Up The Dance", Michigan & Smiley (1979)
- "Rocking Universally", Jackie Mittoo (1979)
- "Armagideon Time", Willi Williams (1977) / The Clash (1979)
- "One Jah, Aim & Destiny", Hugh Mundell (1979)
- "Nice Up The Party" , Welton Irie-Joe Gibbs (producer) ( 1980 )
- “Pie In The Sky”, Scientist (1982)
- "Lend Me Your Chopper" / "Lend Me the 16", Johnny Osbourne (1983)
- "Cockney Translation", Smiley Culture (1984)
- "Eni Meeni Mini Mo", Tenor Saw (1985)
- "Dem A Go Feel It", Frankie Paul (1985)
- "Now Me Come", Little John (musician)-Steely & Clevie (1988)
- "Love Me" , Cocoa Tea-Steely & Clevie (1988)
- "Live Good", Clement Irie-Steely & Clevie (1988)
- "The Real Rock", Shinehead (1990)
- "Ram Dance Daughter" ,Sister Nancy (1991)
- "Isn't She Lovely", Yami Bolo-King Jammy ( 1992 )
- "In this Love Together", Tony Tuff-King Jammy ( 1992 )
- "Can't Hold Me", Admiral Tibet-King Jammy ( 1993 )
- "Jah Jah Blessing", Little Devon ( 1993 )
- "If I Ever Fall In Love Again", Sanchez (1993)
- "Black Cop", KRS-One (1993)
- "Un Spectacle De Plus", Billy Ze Kick (1993)
- "DJ School", Rebel MC Congo Natty feat.Tenor Fly ( 1994 )
- "Everyman", D.R.S. Featuring Kenny Ken (1994)
- “Roots Reality and Culture”, Bounty Killer (1994)
- "All Mixed Up", 311 (1995)
- "Too Greedy", Super Cat (1995)
- "Original", Raggasonic (1998)
- "Babylon Guy", Pinchers ( 1999 )
- A hidden track at the end of Seeed's New Dubby Conquerors album (2001)
- "Keep In Touch", Sizzla (2003)
- "She Loves Me Now", Cocoa Tea (1999) (Sundance 2008)

== Track listing ==
A-side
No.	Title	Writer(s)	Producer	Length
1.	"Real Rock"	C. Dodd	Clement "Coxsone" Dodd

B-side
No.	Title	Writer(s)	Producer	Length
2.	"Real Dub"	C. Dodd	Clement "Coxsone" Dodd

B-side
No.	Title	Writer(s)	Producer	Length
2.	"Real Rock Version"	C. Dodd	Clement "Coxsone" Dodd
