= Revelation Time =

Studio album by Max Romeo
- Released: 1975
- Studio: Black Ark, Kingston, Jamaica; Randy's, Kingston, Jamaica
- Genre: Reggae
- Label: Tropical Sound Tracs
- Producer: Clive "Azul" Hunt, Pete Weston on "Revelation Time", Lee Perry on "Three Blind Mice"

Max Romeo chronology
Let the Power Fall (1971)	Revelation Time (1975)	War Ina Babylon (1976)

Professional ratings
Review scores
Source	Rating
AllMusic	4.5/5 stars
Christgau's Record Guide	A−
Tom Hull – on the Web	B+

Revelation Time is an album by Max Romeo, released in 1975. It was re-released by United Artists Records in 1978 as Open the Iron Gate.

The album explored religious and social problems-oriented themes, and is regarded as Romeo's best album, along with War Ina Babylon. Initially, it was available only in Jamaica, where it was re-released in 1977 as Warning Warning! with re-arranged track listing. The album saw its international release in 1978 as Open the Iron Gate, again with altered running order. In 1999 an anthology Open the Iron Gate: 1973-77 was released, consisting of the Revelation Time material and bonus tracks. On July 3, 2020, remastered Revelation Time with 19 tracks was released from 17 North Parade label.

== Track listing ==
=== Original release ===
All tracks composed by Max Romeo; except where indicated

Side A

1. "Revelation Time" (Max Romeo, Pete Weston) – 2:44
2. "No Peace" (Clive Hunt) – 3:39
3. "Tacko" (Clive Hunt) – 2:47
4. "Blood of the Prophet" (Clive Hunt, Sepi) – 3:27
5. "Blood of the Prophet Pt. II" (Clive Hunt, Sepi) – 3:00

Side B

1. "Warning, Warning" – 3:54
2. "A Quarter Pound of I'cense" – 2:40
3. "Three Blind Mice" (Lee Perry, Max Romeo) – 2:57
4. "Open the Iron Gate" – 2:57
5. "Open the Iron Gate Pt. II" – 2:25

=== Warning Warning! ===
Side A

1. "Warning, Warning"
2. "A Quarter Pound of I'cense"
3. "Three Blind Mice"
4. "Open the Iron Gate"
5. "Open the Iron Gate Pt. II"

Side B

1. "No Peace"
2. "Revelation Time"
3. "Tacko"
4. "Blood of the Prophet"
5. "Blood of the Prophet Pt. II"

=== Open the Iron Gate ===
Side A

1. "Open the Iron Gate" – 5:29
2. "No Peace" – 3:38
3. "Tacko" – 2:40
4. "Blood of the Prophet" – 6:04

Side B

1. "Warning, Warning" – 3:52
2. "A Quarter Pound of I'cense" – 2:37
3. "Three Blind Mice" – 2:57
4. "Revelation Time" – 2:45

=== 2020 edition ===
Remastered with bonus tracks
No.	Title	Writer(s)	Producer(s)	Length
1.	"Revelation Time"	M. Smith	Pete Weston	2:37
2.	"Message From The Top"	P. Weston / R. Reid	Pete Weston	2:50
3.	"Hammer And Sickle"	M. Smith	Pete Weston	2:30
4.	"No Peace"	M. Smith	Clive Hunt	3:43
5.	"Tacko"	M. Smith	Clive Hunt	2:50
6.	"Dub A Boo"	M. Smith	Clive Hunt	2:56
7.	"Blood Of The Prophet"	M. Smith	Clive Hunt	3:32
8.	"Blood Of The Prophet Pt. 2"	M. Smith	Clive Hunt	2:52
9.	"Warning, Warning"	M. Smith	Clive Hunt	3:58
10.	"Heads A Go Roll"	M. Smith	Clive Hunt	3:43
11.	"A Quarter Pound Of I'cense"	M. Smith	Clive Hunt	2:43
12.	"Three Blind Mice"	M. Smith	Lee Perry	2:54
13.	"Open The Iron Gate"	M. Smith	Clive Hunt	3:03
14.	"Open The Iron Gate Pt. 2"	M. Smith	Clive Hunt	2:10
15.	"Socialism Is Love"	M. Smith	Clive Hunt	2:46
16.	"Youthman, Rootsman"	M. Smith	Clive Hunt	2:40
17.	"Black Equality"	M. Smith	Pete Weston	3:01
18.	"No Joshua No"	M. Smith	Pete Weston	3:26
19.	"Yes Joshua"	M. Smith	Pete Weston	3:20

== Singles ==
- 1973: "Three Blind Mice"
- 1975: "Revelation Time"

== Personnel ==
- Max Romeo - vocals
- Earl "Chinna" Smith, Filberto Callendar, Michael Murray, Tony Chin - guitar
- Geoffrey Chung - guitars, bass, keyboards
- Bernard "Touter" Harvey, Robert Lyn - keyboards
- Clive Hunt - keyboards, bass, percussion
- Tyrone Downie - keyboards and harmonica
- Aston "Family Man" Barrett, George Fullwood - bass
- Carlton "Santa" Davis, Carlton Barrett, Derrick Stewart, Michael Richards - drums
- Lee Perry, Michael Murray - percussion
- Bobby Ellis, Richard "Dirty Harry" Hall, Tommy McCook - horns

Technical

- Geoffrey Chung - executive producer
- George Philpott, Lee Perry - engineer
- Geoffrey Chung, Ronald Logan - mixing
