= War Ina Babylon =

Studio album by Max Romeo
- Released: 1976
- Studios: Black Ark, Washington Gardens, Kingston, Jamaica
- Genres: Dub, reggae
- Length: 37:58
- Label: Island
- Producer: Lee "Scratch" Perry

Max Romeo chronology
Revelation Time (1975)	War Ina Babylon (1976)	Reconstruction (1977)

Professional ratings
Review scores
Source	Rating
AllMusic	4.5/5 stars
Christgau's Record Guide	B+
Reggae Reviews	3/5 stars

War Ina Babylon is a studio album by Max Romeo and Lee Perry's backing band the Upsetters, released in 1976.

Along with the Heptones' Party Time and Junior Murvin's Police and Thieves, both released in 1977, this album is a part of what is referred to as Lee "Scratch" Perry-produced Black Ark "holy trinity".

== Track listing ==
All tracks composed by Max Romeo and Lee "Scratch" Perry except where indicated.

Side A

1. "One Step Forward" – 5:15
2. "Uptown Babies" (Romeo) – 5:00
3. "Chase the Devil" – 3:27
4. "War ina Babylon" – 4:51

Side B

1. "Norman" – 4:50
2. "Stealin'" (Romeo) – 3:04
3. "Tan and See" (Romeo, Perry, Brown) – 4:36
4. "Smokey Room" (Romeo, Perry, Brown) – 3:03
5. "Smile Out a Style" – 3:32

== Personnel ==
- Max Romeo – lead vocals
- Barry Llewellyn, Earl Morgan – male harmony vocals
- Cynthia Schloss, Marcia Griffiths – female harmony vocals

Technical

- Lee "Scratch" Perry – production, engineering
- Tony Wright – cover artwork
- Kim Gottlieb – back cover photography

== Singles ==
- 1975: "One Step Forward"
- 1976: "War in a Babylon"
- 1976: "Chase the Devil"
- 1977: "Norman"
