= Max Romeo =

Jamaican reggae musician (1944–2025)

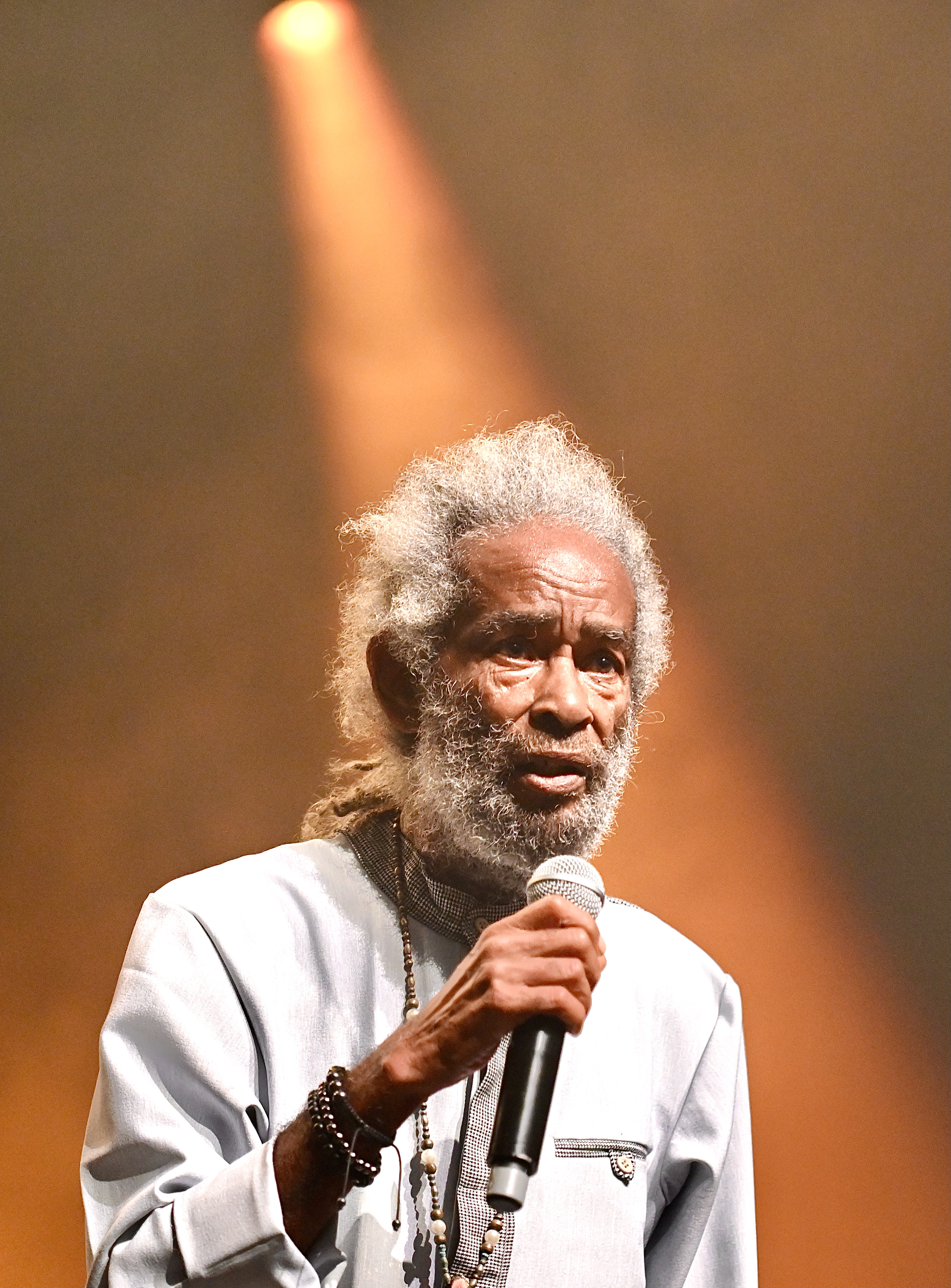
- Romeo in 2022

Background information
- Also known as: Adulfus Dulfile; Maxie Smith; The Son of Selassie
- Born: Maxwell Smith; 22 November 1944; Saint Ann Parish, Jamaica
- Origin: Saint James Parish, Jamaica
- Died: 11 April 2025 (aged 80) Saint Andrew Parish, Jamaica
- Genres: Reggae; roots reggae
- Years active: 1965–2025
- Labels: Charmax, Capo

Maxwell Smith (22 November 1944 – 11 April 2025), known professionally as Max Romeo, was a Jamaican reggae and roots reggae recording musician who achieved chart success in his home country and in the United Kingdom. He had several hits with the vocal group the Emotions. His song "Wet Dream" (1968) included overtly sexual lyrics and launched a new style of reggae.

== Biography ==
=== Early years ===
Born in St. D'Acre, St. Ann, Jamaica on 22 November 1944, Romeo left home at the age of 14 and worked on a sugar plantation outside Clarendon, before winning a local talent competition when he was 18. This prompted a move to the capital, Kingston, in order to embark on a musical career.

=== Career debuts ===
In 1965, Romeo joined up with Kenneth Knight and Lloyd Shakespeare in the Jamaican vocal group, The Emotions, whilst also working in sales for the Caltone label. The group were unsuccessful in auditions for other producers, but Ken Lack offered them an audition after overhearing Smith singing to himself while working. In 1966, the group had their first hit, with the Lack-produced "(Buy You) A Rainbow". The Emotions went on to release several hit singles, and by 1968, the singer, by that point known as Max Romeo, began his solo career in 1968, but did not have any great successes on the charts. Romeo returned to The Emotions, now recording for Phil Pratt, and founded a new band, The Hippy Boys.

=== Solo career ===
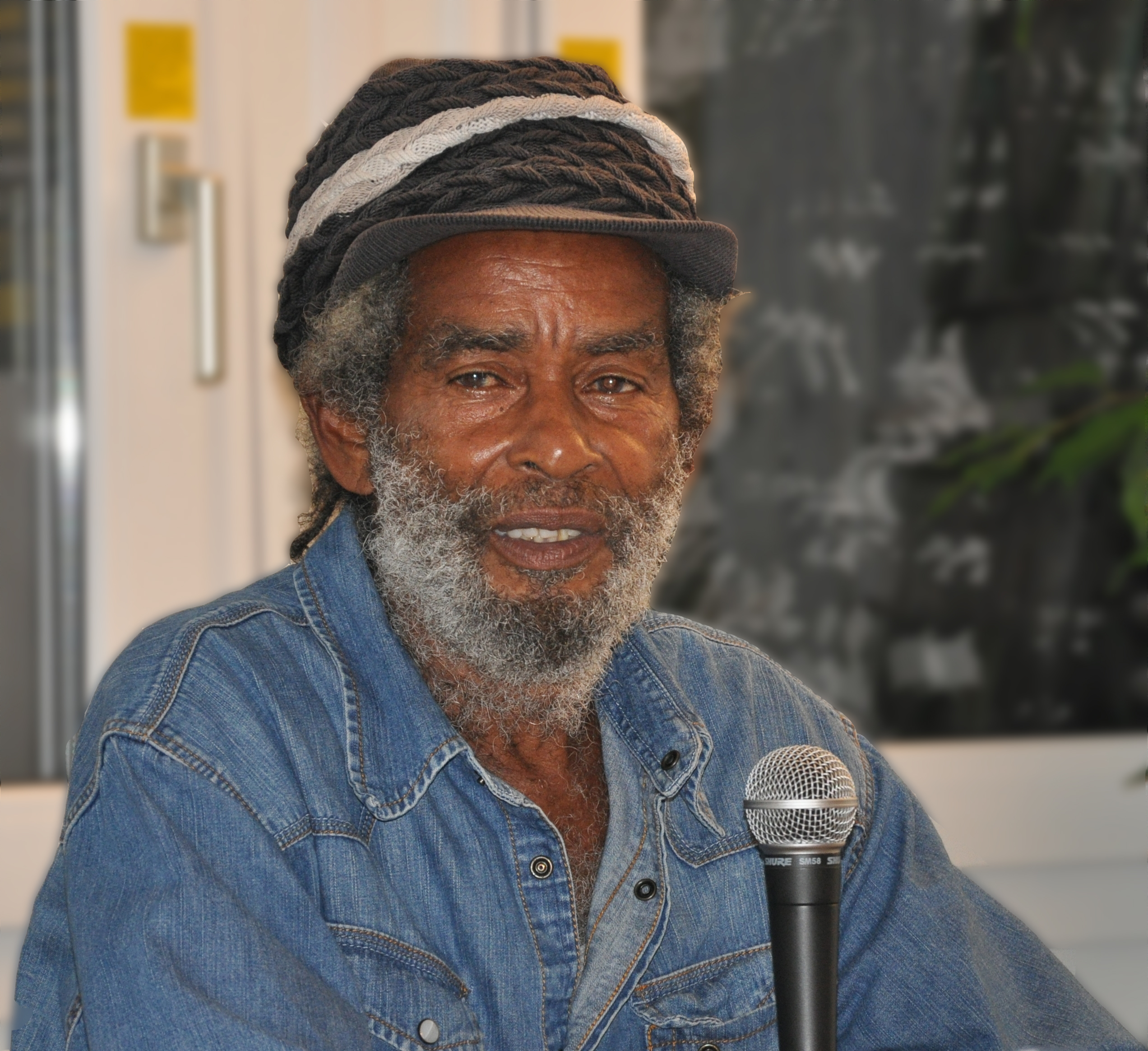
Max Romeo, 2013

1968 saw the breakthrough in Romeo's career, when he wrote "Wet Dream", a song that became a massive hit in Jamaica. The track was banned by BBC Radio in the UK due to its overtly sexual lyrics, although the singer claimed that it was about a leaking roof. Nevertheless, "Wet Dream" became a Top 10 hit in the UK, where it spent six months in the chart. Further records that came out in 1969 were "Belly Woman", "Wine Her Goosie" and "Mini-Skirt Vision", as well as Max Romeo's debut LP, A Dream. Romeo was banned from performing at several venues during a tour of the UK.

In 1970, Romeo returned to Jamaica, setting up Romax, an unsuccessful record label and sound system, and released in 1971 his second album, Let the Power Fall. It included a number of politically charged songs, most advocating the democratic socialist People's National Party (PNP), which chose his song "Let the Power Fall" as their theme song for the 1972 Jamaican general election. It became the anthem of the People’s National Party movement and marked a moment when culture and politics walked hand in hand toward the promise of a more just Jamaica. He was one of the influential artists, along with Bob Marley, who toured Jamaica on the PNP's Bandwagon during the 1972 general election campaign.

After this, Romeo worked with producer Lee "Scratch" Perry on the album Revelation Time (1975), which featured the classic song "Three Blind Mice", an adaptation of the nursery rhyme with lyrics about a police raid on a party.

In 1976, Romeo released War Ina Babylon, an album perceived as his best work. The politically and religiously themed album included the popular single "Chase the Devil", which would become one of his best-known songs. Shortly after this, the pair fell out, leaving Romeo to self-produce his follow-up album, Reconstruction, which could not match the success of its predecessors when it was released in 1977.

In 1978, Romeo moved to New York City, where he co-wrote (with Hair producer Michael Butler) the musical Reggae, which he also starred in.

In 1980, he appeared as a backing vocalist on "Dance" on the Rolling Stones album Emotional Rescue. In 1981, the favour was returned when Keith Richards of the Rolling Stones co-produced and played on Romeo's album Holding Out My Love to You, an unsuccessful attempt by Romeo to break into the North American market.

The rest of his output during the decade went practically unnoticed, with Romeo finding work at a New York electronics store. John Holt encouraged him to return to Jamaica, and he lived at Holt's house in Meadowbrook for a year.

Romeo visited the UK again in 1992, recording albums Fari – Captain of My Ship (1992) and Our Rights (1995) with Jah Shaka. He joined up with UK rhythm section/production team Mafia & Fluxy in 1998 for the album Selassie I Forever. A compilation album, The Many Moods of Max Romeo, was released in the UK in 1999.

In 2014, he released the album Father and Sons, a collaboration with his sons Ronaldo and Romario (known as the duo Rominal). His daughter Azana Smith has also started a recording career under the name Xana Romeo.

In 2023, he filed a lawsuit against Universal Music Group and PolyGram Publishing, Inc. for $15 million, claiming that he had not been given royalties for his work for over 50 years.

== Death ==
Romeo died of heart complications at a hospital in Saint Andrew Parish, Jamaica, on 11 April 2025, at the age of 80.

== Discography ==
=== Albums ===
- 1969: A Dream
- 1971: Let the Power Fall
- 1975: Revelation Time (re-released as Open the Iron Gate in 1978)
- 1976: War Ina Babylon (with The Upsetters)
- 1977: Reconstruction
- 1980: Rondos
- 1981: Holding Out My Love to You
- 1982: I Love My Music
- 1984: Max Romeo Meets Owen Gray at King Tubby's Studio (with Owen Gray)
- 1984: Freedom Street
- 1985: One Horse Race
- 1989: Transition (with The Upsetters)
- 1992: Fari – Captain of My Ship (with Jah Shaka)
- 1993: On the Beach
- 1994: The Cross or the Gun
- 1995: Our Rights (with Jah Shaka)
- 1998: Selassie I Forever
- 1999: Love Message
- 1999: Something Is Wrong
- 2001: In This Time
- 2004: A Little Time for Jah
- 2005: Crazy World of Dub
- 2006: Max Romeo Sings Hits of Bob Marley
- 2007: Pocomania Songs
- 2014: Father and Sons
- 2016: Horror Zone
- 2019: Words From The Brave
- 2020: Revelation Time (remastered with bonus tracks)
- 2021: World Of Ghouls

=== Compilation albums ===
- 1993: Wet Dream
- 1999: Open the Iron Gate: 1973–77
- 1999: The Many Moods of Max Romeo
- 2000: Pray for Me: 1967 to 1973 – The Best of Max Romeo
- 2002: Perilous Times: 1974–1999
- 2002: The Coming of Jah – Anthology 1967–76
- 2003: Ultimate Collection
- 2004: Wet Dream – The Best of Max Romeo
- 2008: Best Of
- 2009: 36 Carat Golden Hits

=== Singles ===
- 1967: "Don't Want to Let You Go" (with The Emotions)
- 1968: "Wet Dream" (UK number 10 in June 1969)
- 1969: "Belly Woman"
- 1969: "Twelfth of Never"
- 1969: "Wine Her Goosie"
- 1969: "Mini-Skirt Vision"
- 1969: "Blowing in the Wind"
- 1970: "Melting Pot" (with The Hippy Boys)
- 1970: "What a Cute Man"
- 1971: "Let the Power Fall"
- 1971: "Macabee Version"
- 1971: "Don't You Weep"
- 1971: "Ginal Ship"
- 1971: "Black Equality"
- 1971: "Chie Chie Bud"
- 1971: "The Coming of Jah"
- 1972: "Rasta Band Wagon"
- 1972: "Public Enemy No. 1"
- 1972: "No Joshua No"
- 1972: "Press Along Joshua"
- 1972: "When Jah Speaks"
- 1972: "We Love Jamaica"
- 1972: "Is It Really Over?"
- 1972: "Aily and Ailaloo" (as Niney and Max)
- 1972: "Are You Sure"
- 1973: "Every Man Ought to Know"
- 1973: "Evening News"
- 1973: "Rent Crisis"
- 1973: "Three Blind Mice"
- 1974: "Corner Stone"
- 1974: "Don't Rock My Boat"
- 1974: "Socialism Is Love"
- 1974: "Put a Little Aside"
- 1974: "Sixpence"
- 1974: "A Lie Them a Tell"
- 1974: "Red House"
- 1974: "The Reverend"
- 1975: "One Step Forward"
- 1975: "God Bless Jamaica"
- 1975: "Youthman, Rootsman"
- 1975: "Revelation Time"
- 1975: "Johosaphatt the Lost Valley"
- 1975: "Heads a Go Roll"
- 1975: "Natty Dread Take Over"
- 1975: "Jamaicans: God Bless You"
- 1975: "Big Jack"
- 1975: "Mr. Fixit"
- 1976: "War in a Babylon (It Sipple Out Deh)"
- 1976: "Fire Fe the Vatican"
- 1976: "Hola Zion"
- 1976: "I Chase the Devil"
- 1976: "Mr. Jones"
- 1976: "Deacon Wife"
- 1976: "If Them Ever"
- 1977: "Norman"
- 1982: "I Love My Music"
- 1988: "Keep on Moving"
- 1992: "Fari – Captain of My Ship"
- 1992: "Rich People"
- 1992: "Melt Away"
- 1993: "Wicked Have to Run Away"
- 1998: "Selassie I Forever"
- 1999: "In This Time"
- 2000: "Marching"
- 2000: "Perilous Time"
- 2004: "Outta Babylon"
- 2005: "Juks We a Juks"
- 2006: "Babylon Fall" (with Rebel Familia)
- 2006: "Luw Them"
- 2006: "Give Praises"
- 2007: "Birth of Reggae Music"
- 2009: "My Jamaican Collie"
- 2011: "Protest to the M1"
- 2021: “Public Enemy”
- 2022: “Just Like The Rainbow”

== See also ==
- List of reggae musicians
- List of roots reggae artists
- Island Records discography
- Pama Records
