= The Keyboard King at Studio One =

Compilation album by Jackie Mittoo
- Released: 2000
- Studio: Studio One
- Label: Universal Sound

The Keyboard King at Studio One is a 2000 compilation album from Jackie Mittoo.

== Music and content ==
The music on The Keyboard King at Studio One consists of Jackie Mittoo's the late 1960s and 1970s work. Tracks are taken from Mittoo solo albums like Keep on Dancing (1969), Jackie Mittoo Now (1970), and Macka Fat (1971).

== Release ==
The album was released on compact disc and vinyl by Soul Jazz Records in 2000. The album was re-released by Soul Jazz Records for its 20th anniversary on February 4, 2021 on blue coloured vinyl.

== Reception ==
Professional ratings
Review scores
Source	Rating
AllMusic	4.5/5 stars
The Guardian	5/5 stars
The Independent	4/5 stars

The Guardian gave the album a five-star rating and called it their Pop CD of the Week on February 11, 2000. Proclaiming that Mittoo sounds "utterly complacent, cocky" and that Mittoo's "slow-motion hedonism makes Isaac Hayes and George Clinton resemble walking anxiety attacks." Tim Perry of The Independent gave the album four stars out of five, praising the album as a mix of "rocksteady and ska mixed with an addictive funkiness, it's a tasty fusion of Memphis and Kingson." Nathan Bush of AllMusic gave the album a four and a half star rating out of five, declaring it an "excellent introduction to a rhythm master and reggae legend."

== Track listing ==
1. "Get Up And Get It" – 2:44
2. "Black Organ" – 3:11
3. "Killer Diller" – 2:47
4. "Totally Together" – 2:36
5. "Hot Tamale" – 2:23
6. "Reggae Rock" – 1:57
7. "Oboe" – 9:38
8. "Juice Box" – 4:37
9. "Summer Breeze" – 3:44
10. "Drum Song" – 4:24
11. "P. Cafe" – 2:48
12. "Henry The Great" – 3:32
13. "Stereo Freeze" – 3:05
14. "Wall Street" – 7:14
15. "Darker Shade Of Black" – 3:14
