= Reconstruction (Max Romeo album) =

Studio album by Max Romeo
- Released: 1977
- Recorded: Harry J, Kingston, Jamaica
- Genre: Reggae
- Label: Island, Dynamic Sounds
- Producer: Max Romeo

Max Romeo chronology
War Ina Babylon (1976)	Reconstruction (1977)	Rondos (1980)

Professional ratings
Review scores
Source	Rating
AllMusic	4/5 stars

Reconstruction is an album by Max Romeo, released in 1977.

Shortly after recording the critically acclaimed album War Ina Babylon, Max Romeo broke up with his producer Lee "Scratch" Perry on professional ground, which prompted him to self-produce his next album. Reconstruction did not match the success of its predecessor and in 1978 Romeo left Jamaica.

== Track listing ==
Side A

1. "Reconstruction" (Max Romeo) – 4:16
2. "Poor Man's Life" (Max Romeo, Ricky Storm) – 3:49
3. "Let's Live Together" (Max Romeo, Michael Williams) – 3:40
4. "Melt Away" (Max Romeo, Earl Smith) – 3:53
5. "War Rock" (Max Romeo, Michael Williams) – 4:40

Side B

1. "Where Is the Love" (Max Romeo) – 3:00
2. "Give to Get" (Max Romeo) – 3:22
3. "Martin Luther King" (Max Romeo) – 3:26
4. "Take a Hold" (Max Romeo, Ricky Storm) – 3:27
5. "Destination Africa" (Max Romeo, Michael Ebanks) – 3:13

== Personnel ==
- Max Romeo - vocals, arrangements
- Ernie Ranglin - guitar
- Earl Smith - rhythm guitar
- Earl Lindo - organ
- Keith Sterling - piano
- Boris Gardiner - bass
- Michael "Mikey Boo" Richards - drums
- Uziah "Sticky" Thompson - percussion
- Glen DaCosta - saxophone
- David Madden - trumpet
- Vin Gordon - trombone
- Bobby Ellis - flugelhorn
- Jimmy Riley, Ricky Storm, Sheena - background vocals
- Sylvan Morris - engineer
