= Kosmo Vinyl =

- Born: Mark C. Dunk; 9 February 1957 (age 69); England
- Occupations: Record producer, manager
- Years active: 197? – present

Kosmo Vinyl (born Mark C. Dunk, 9 February 1957, England) is a former longtime associate and sometime manager for The Clash, as well as being associated with Ian Dury & the Blockheads, two seminal English bands of the 1970s and 1980s.

== Career ==
Vinyl can be heard introducing The Clash at Shea Stadium on The Clash's live album, Live at Shea Stadium, as well as many bootlegged performances such as Kingston Advice. His impressionistic reading of quotes from Travis Bickle in the film Taxi Driver can be heard on The Clash's "Red Angel Dragnet".

Prior to his association with the Clash, he had acted as MC on the Stiff Records tours, appearing on the 1978 LP Live Stiffs Live.

He later became a record producer, producing records by Jack Logan, Drivin N Cryin and Jack Black (a 90's NYC punk trio).

Vinyl was a music consultant on Gus Van Sant's 1989 film, Drugstore Cowboy, and in 2013, helped produce a major retrospective exhibition of the art of Ian Dury, at The Royal College of Art in London. He debuted his own punk rock/pop art inspired artwork dedicated to his beloved West Ham United Football Club with a London exhibition, followed by a show in Somerset in 2014 during the FIFA World Cup. In 2017 he designed the artwork for The Blockheads Single "Hold Up" and the album Beyond the Call of Dury.

== Personal life ==
His first son, Jack, was born in 1991.
