= Ranking Joe =

- Born: Joseph Jackson
- Origin: Kingston, Jamaica
- Genre: Reggae
- Label: spice island

Ranking Joe a.k.a. Little Joe (born Joseph Jackson, 1 July 1959, Kingston, Jamaica) is a reggae deejay who rose to prominence in the 1970s and had continuing success in the 1980s.

== Biography ==
Jackson was initially inspired towards a musical career by his father, who operated a sound system. He attended secondary school with Winston McAnuff, U Brown and Earl Sixteen, and they would perform concerts. After starting out by toasting on the Smith The Weapon sound system, Jackson progressed to the El Paso sound system, where he performed under the name Little Joe (inspired by the character from Bonanza), inspired greatly by U-Roy. He first recorded for Coxsone Dodd's Studio One in 1974, releasing "Gun Court". Initially unsuccessful as a recording artist, he studied electronics before returning to recording in the mid-1970s with greater success, having a hit with "Honda 750", which was followed by singles such as "Psalm 54", "Natty Don't Make War" and the Bionic Man-tribute "Steve Austin". "Stop Your Coming and Come" provided the first deejay hit for Sly & Robbie's Taxi label. In the latter half of the 1970s he released three albums and also returned to sound system work with U-Roy's King Sturgav setup. His big break in international terms came in 1980, when the Ray Symbolic Hi Fi sound system, with which he was then the resident deejay, toured the United Kingdom, raising his profile and helping his Weakheart Fadeaway become a major seller for Greensleeves Records. A string of further albums followed in the early 1980s, which saw Joe move away from the "cultural" chants of his early work towards the "slackness" that had become popular. Ray Symbolic's death interrupted Joe's career, but he returned as a producer, with dubs of his productions released on the King Tubby albums Original King Key Dub and Dangerous Dub. He later moved to New York City, setting up a record label, also named Ranking Joe, which provided an outlet for his productions. He proved to be a major influence on one of the most successful deejays of the early 1980s, Eek-A-Mouse. In 2012, he was featured alongside Ansel Meditations on the opening track "Desert Ska" of The Skatalites' studio album Walk With Me.

== Albums ==
- The Best of Ranking Joe (1977) TR International/State Line
- Weakheart Fadeaway (1978) Greensleeves
- Round The World (1978) Nationwide/Student
- Dub It In a Dance (1980) Trojan
- Natty Superstar (1980) Joe Gibbs
- Saturday Night Jamdown Style (1980) Greensleeves/Jah Guidance
- Shaolin Temple (1980) Sharp Axe
- Showcase (1981) Tad's
- Disco Skate (1981) Copasetic
- Tribute to John Lennon (1981) Tad's
- Armageddon (1982) Kingdom
- Rebel DJ (1982) Jam Rock
- Check It Out (1983) Vista
- Fast Forward To Africa (1996) Ariwa
- Man and His Music (Mr Finnigan) (1997) Jasrac (compilation)
- Armageddon Time (2000) M10 (compilation)
- 3 The Roots Way (2002) Krescendo (with U Brown and Trinity)
- Zion High (2003) Blood & Fire (Ranking Joe with Black Uhuru and Dennis Brown) (compilation)
- Ghetto People (2004) Culture Press
- World In Trouble (2006) M
- World In Dub (2006) M
