= The New Establishment =

The New Establishment were a Jamaican reggae band active from 1972 to 1974 on the Bongo Man label. One of their notable songs included "Rockfort Rock".
