= Lester Sterling =

Jamaican trumpet and saxophone player (1936–2023)

Lester Sterling OD
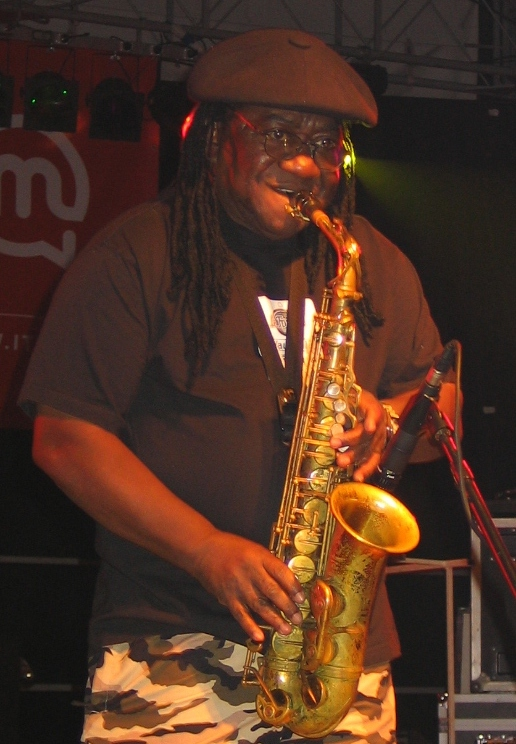
- Sterling playing alto sax in 2007

Background information
- Born: 31 January 1936; Kingston, Jamaica
- Died: 16 May 2023 (aged 87)
- Genres: Ska, reggae
- Instruments: Saxophone, trumpet
- Years active: 1950s–2023

Lester "Ska" Sterling OD (31 January 1936 – 16 May 2023), also known as Mr. Versatile, was a Jamaican trumpet and saxophone player.

== Early life ==
Sterling was born on 31 January 1936. Like many Jamaican musicians of his generation, Sterling attended the Alpha Boys School. Sterling's brother is keyboard player Keith Sterling.

== Career ==
Originally a trumpeter, he was predominantly known as a player of alto saxophone. He was a member of the Jamaica Military Band in the 1950s and played trumpet in Val Bennett's band in 1957. In the late 1950s and early 1960s, Sterling played regularly as a studio musician, along with most of the future Skatalites members, in bands such as Clue J & His Blues Blasters.

Sterling was a founding member of The Skatalites (playing alto saxophone). After The Skatalites originally disbanded in 1965, Sterling played with Byron Lee & the Dragonaires and recorded several solo singles for the London-based producer "Sir" Clancy Collins. His debut solo album, Bangarang, was released on Pama Records in 1969. Sterling rejoined the Skatalites when they reformed in 1975. The band have continued on and off with a varying line-up since, and Sterling was the only founding member still with the band. Sterling was awarded the Order of Distinction in 1998 in recognition of his contribution to Jamaican music.

Lester Sterling was honored by the USA chapter of JAVAA - "JAVAA USA.ORG" at their first awards ceremony held in Brooklyn New York in April 2013. That event was launched under the distinguished patronage of the Consulate General of Jamaica. Sterling was given a pioneers award in the field of music for his contribution since 1964.

== Death ==
Sterling died on 16 May 2023, at the age of 87. At the time of his death he was the second to last surviving founder member of The Skatalites (Doreen Shaffer is still alive).

== Discography ==
=== Albums ===
- Bangarang (1969), Pama
- Sterling Silver (2002) Echo Records

with The Skatalites (selected later albums)

- Walk With Me (2012), Wrasse – alto saxophone, flute, composer ("Little Teresa")

as a featured artist

- The Ska-Flames featuring Laurel Aitken, Roland Alphonso & Lester Sterling - Damn Good (1995), Sun Shot
