= Sound Dimension =

Jamaican reggae band

- Also known as: The Soul Vendors; Tomorrow Generation
- Origin: Kingston, Jamaica
- Genres: Reggae
- Years active: 1967–1979
- Labels: Studio One; Coxsone Records
- Past members: Richard Ace; Headley Bennett; Cedric Brooks; Karl Bryan; Fil Callender; Enid Campbell; Eric Frater; Rick Frater; Boris Gardiner; Vin Gordon; Joe Isaacs; Denzil Laing; Robbie Lyn; Jackie Mittoo; Ernest Ranglin; Leroy Sibbles; Brian "Bassie" Atkinson; Leroy Wallace

Sound Dimension (previously named The Soul Vendors) was a Jamaican reggae band formed in 1967 in Kingston, Jamaica. They were the house band at Clement "Coxsone" Dodd's Studio One. They were named after a piece of studio equipment called the Sound Dimension. Their 1967 recorded track "Real Rock" became a famous riddim.

== Members ==
Membership varied from time to time. The following musicians appear on Sound Dimension recordings:

- Vocals: Leroy Sibbles
- Guitar: Eric Frater, Ernest Ranglin
- Bass; Boris Gardiner, Leroy Sibbles, Brian "Bassie" Atkinson
- Keyboards: Richard Ace, Robbie Lyn, Jackie Mittoo
- Saxophone: Headley Bennett, Cedric Brooks, Karl Bryan
- Trombone: Vin Gordon
- Percussion: Fil Callender, Enid Campbell, Denzel Laing, Leroy Wallace
- Drums: Fil Callender, Joe Isaacs, Leroy Wallace
