= Tony Tuff =

Jamaican reggae singer (1955–2024)

- Born: Winston Anthony Morris; 1 April 1955
- Origin: Kingston, Jamaica
- Died: 20 April 2024 (aged 69)
- Genres: Roots Reggae, Dub, dancehall, lovers rock
- Years active: 1969–2024
- Formerly of: The African Brothers

Winston Anthony Morris (1 April 1955 – 20 April 2024), known professionally as Tony Tuff, was a Jamaican conscious roots reggae singer and a member of The African Brothers in the late 1960s and 1970s before embarking on a solo career.

== Biography ==
Tuff started his career in 1969 as a member of the vocal trio The African Brothers, along with Sugar Minott and Derrick "Bubbles" Howard. The African Brothers split up in the mid-1970s, and Tuff pursued other work outside music until he returned as a solo artist in the late 1970s, with the album Tony Tuff Meets Errol Schorder [sic], split with Errol Scorcher, and self-productions including the "I'm So Glad" single on his own Winston label.

In 1978, founding his lyrics on Matthew 5, Sermon on the Mount Beatitudes, he released "Deliver Me" Discomix with Sly and Robbie and Sugar Minott at Channel One Studios. He worked with Yabby You on the Tony Tuff album in 1980, and worked with Minott again on the 1981 album Presenting Mr. Tuff, released on Minott's Black Roots worked on several sound systems in the late 1970s and 1980s, including Lees Unlimited and Henry "Junjo" Lawes' Volcano system.

Drawing lyrical inspiration from Parables in Luke 12 Tony Tuff released "Love Light Shining" with Coxsone Dodd. The horns melody and bass line from the song was later reworked by Hugh Mundell in his Scientist-produced Discomix track "Red Gold and Green."Joseph Hoo Kim also released a version of the tune with Tony Tuff, recorded at Channel One Studios, their recording studio in Maxfield Avenue, West Kingston, Jamaica. Junjo Lawes also produced several successful singles by Tuff including "Water Pumpee" (which peaked at number 10 on the Jamaican singles chart), and "Mix Me Down", and also produced his 1983 album Come Fe Mash It. He continued to be active during the 1980s, but was largely absent from the music scene in the 1990s. He returned in 2000 and recorded several albums in the new millennium, including recording the album How Long and a selection of Discomixes and dubplates with London Rasta Sound System operator, conscious Roots Reggae artist, Jah Shaka. He toured Europe twice in 2002, before touring Canada and the United States.

Tony Tuff died on 20 April 2024, at the age of 69.

== Discography ==
- Tony Tuff Meets Errol Schorder (1978), Mal's – with Errol Scorcher
- Tony Tuff (1980), Grove Music/Island
- Hustling (1981), Scorcher
- Presenting Mr. Tuff (1981), Black Roots
- Reggae in the City (1981), TR International
- Tuff Selection (1982), Island Records
- Come Fe Mash It (1983), Volcano
- Render Your Heart (1984), CSA
- Wha We A Go Do (1984), Top Rank
- Ketch A Fire (1986), Hawkeye
- Keep the Faith (1987), Black Scorpio
- From Tony Tuff To Lovers Everywhere (198?), TR International
- Singers Reggae Showcase (2000), Jamaican Vibes
- Link Up (2001), Rhino
- Hit & Run (2001), Prestige Elite
- Say Something (2006), Groove Attack/Minor 7 Flat 5
- How Long (2006), Jah Shaka Music
- How Long Dub (2009), Jah Shaka Music – Jah Shaka featuring Tony Tuff
- Tony Tuff & Jah Stitch – Rumours of War / Dragon, Snake & Spider

Compilations

- The Best of Tony Tuff (1983), Vista Sounds
- 20 Super Hits (19??), Sonic Sounds
