= Cedric Brooks =

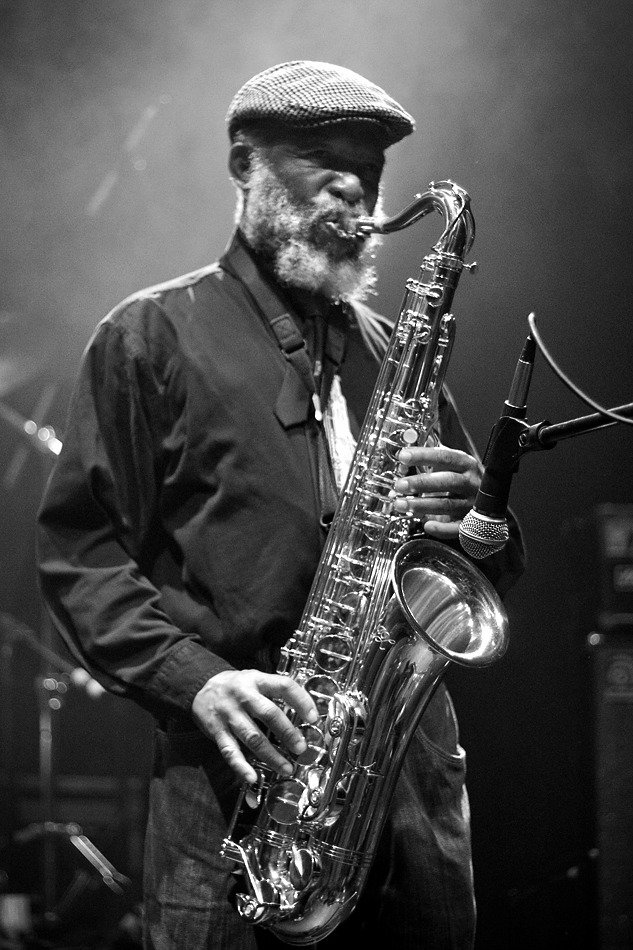
- Brooks in 2009

Background information
- Born: 27 April 1943; Kingston, Jamaica
- Died: 3 May 2013 (aged 70) New York City, United States
- Genres: Reggae, Afrobeat
- Instruments: Tenor saxophone, flute, Drums
- Years active: early 1960s–2013
- Label: Studio One
- Formerly of: Teddy Greaves & The Groovy Group, The Vagabonds, IM & The Aggregators, Im & Dave, The Divine Light, The Mystic Revelation of Rastafari, The Light of Saba, United Africa, The Skatalites, The Sound Dimensions

Cedric Roy "Im" Brooks (27 April 1943 – 3 May 2013) was a Jamaican saxophonist and flautist known for his solo recordings and as a founding member of The Mystic Revelation of Rastafari, The Sound Dimensions, Divine Light, The Light of Saba, United Africa, and The Skatalites.

== Biography ==
Brooks became a pupil at the renowned Alpha Boys School aged 11, where he learned music theory and clarinet. In his late teens he took up tenor saxophone and flute.

Brooks was a member of groups such as The Vagabonds and the Granville Williams Band in the early 1960s. He moved to Philadelphia in 1968, where he met Sun Ra's Arkestra and Sonny Rollins at the Combs College of Music, events that led him to blend experimental jazz into future compositions. He returned to Jamaica in 1970, when he would find his first major commercial success, as part of a duo with trumpeter David Madden, Im & David. The duo released a series of instrumental singles for Clement "Coxsone" Dodd's Studio One label. Brooks also became a regular studio musician at the Brentford Road studio, playing on many recording sessions, and released several solo singles in the early 1970s.

In 1970 he first teamed up with Rastafarian drummer Count Ossie, releasing tracks such as "So Long Rastafari Calling", "Black is Black", and "Give Me Back My Language and Culture" as Im and Count Ossie. The pair would later form The Mystic Revelation of Rastafari, with Brooks acting as musical director and leader of the horn section. From this collaboration resulted the triple-LP set Grounation. Brooks left in 1974 to form a new band, the Divine Light (later called The Light of Saba). After a single, "Demauungwani", the group recorded their first album for the Institute of Jamaica, From Mento to Reggae to Third World Music, a collection exploring the history of Jamaican music, incorporating mento, junkanoo, ska, rocksteady, and reggae. The band made two further albums of jazz-influenced Rastafarian reggae, The Light of Saba and The Light of Saba in Reggae, before Brooks left, again going solo with his 1977 album, Im Flash Forward, featuring Studio One rhythms from the early 1970s, and regarded as one of the greatest Jamaican instrumental albums. The following year, Brooks assembled a new band of musicians to record the United Africa album.

During the 1980s and 1990s, Brooks released a few singles but largely worked as a session musician. In particular, he worked with Carlos Malcolm in San Diego, California, in 1998 as part of a 20-piece ska and mento orchestra known as "Zimbobway's King Kingston Orchestra". These albums featured Im both on saxophone and percussion in many of the 24 recordings. In 1999, after the death of Rolando Alphonso, former saxophonist of the Skatalites, Brooks joined the band.

Brooks died in the New York Hospital, Queens, New York, on 3 May 2013 after suffering a cardiac arrest.

== Selected discography ==
=== Solo ===
- Im Flash Forward (1977), Studio One
- United Africa (1978), ARCO

=== Im & Dave ===
- Money Maker (1970), Coxsone (sometimes credited to Various Artists)

=== With Count Ossie and the Mystic Revelation of Rastafari ===
- Grounation (1973), MRR/Vulcan/Ashanti
- Tales of Mozambique (1975)
- One Truth

=== With The Light of Saba ===
- The Light of Saba (1974), Total Sounds
- From Mento to Reggae to Third World Music (1975), Doctor Bird
- The Light of Saba in Reggae (197?), Total Sounds

Compilations

- Cedric Im Brooks & The Light of Saba (2003), Honest Jon's

=== With the Skatalites ===
- Bashaka (2000)
- From Paris With Love (2002)
- The Skatalites in Orbit, Vol. 1 (2005)
- On The Right Track (2007)

=== Session work ===
- Negril (LP, 1975. Micron Music Ltd) (CD, 2003. 3D Japan)
- Cameron & the Trenton Street Collaborative – Cameron Greenlee (EP, 2009, Naya Records) – tenor saxophone
