= Jackie Mittoo =

Jamaican-Canadian musician (1948–1990)

- Born: Donat Roy Mittoo; 3 March 1948
- Origin: Brown's Town, Saint Ann Parish, Jamaica
- Died: 16 December 1990 (aged 42) Toronto, Ontario, Canada
- Genres: Ska, rocksteady, reggae, funk
- Instrument: Keyboards
- Label: Studio One

Donat Roy Mittoo (3 March 1948 – 16 December 1990), better known as Jackie Mittoo, was a Jamaican-Canadian keyboardist, songwriter and musical director. He was a member of the Skatalites and musical director of the Studio One record label.

Upon hearing of Mittoo's death, Coxsone Dodd commented "He was an ambassador of our music worldwide... there can be no doubt. Read the legacy this young man has left behind. May his name be remembered and his music live on".

== Biography ==
Mittoo, of partial Indo-Jamaican descent, was born in Brown's Town, Saint Ann Parish, Jamaica, and began learning to play the piano when he was three under the tutelage of his grandmother.

In the 1960s, he was a member of the Skatalites, the Sheiks, the Soul Brothers, the Soul Vendors and Sound Dimension. Mittoo's compositions in this period included "Darker Shade of Black", "Feel Like Jumping", and "Baby Why". He played with Lloyd "Matador" Daley in 1968 and 1969.

In 1968, he emigrated to Toronto, Ontario, Canada. There he recorded three albums, Wishbone (Summus), Reggae Magic (CTL) and Let's Put It All Together (CTL). He also set up the Stine-Jac record label, as well as running a record store.

In 1970, his song "Peanie Wallie" was reworked into a song called "Duppy Conqueror" and recorded by The Wailers. Mittoo's song "Wishbone" was a hit in 1971. He performed in local Toronto lounges throughout the 1970s. Mittoo assisted Toronto-area reggae musicians, including Earth, Roots and Water, Esso Jaxxon (R. Zee Jackson), Carl Harvey, Lord Tanamo, Boyo Hammond, Carl Otway, the Sattalites, Jackie James and Jason Wilson. Mittoo continued to record for Jamaican producers in the 1970s, mostly Bunny Lee. He co-wrote "Armagideon Time" (later recorded by the Clash) with Willi Williams, released in 1980.

In the 1980s, he often worked with Sugar Minott. In 1985, he travelled to Ghana with the British band Musical Youth, and while there recorded tracks that would later be released on the album Jackie Mittoo in Africa. In 1989, he briefly rejoined the Skatalites, but left when his health started to deteriorate. In 1989 and 1990, he recorded Wild Jockey for Lloyd Barnes' Wackies label.

Mittoo entered a hospital on 12 December 1990 and died of cancer on 16 December at the age of 42. His funeral was held at the National Arena in Kingston, Jamaica, on 2 January 1991. Hortense Ellis, Neville 'Tinga' Stewart, Desmond "Desi Roots" Young, Ruddy Thomas, Tommy Cowan and Clement "Coxsone" Dodd were among the attendees. A memorial concert was held around the same time, with performances by Vin Gordon, Leroy "Horsemouth" Wallace, Glen 'Bagga' Fagan, Pablo Black, Robbie Lyn, Michael "Ibo" Cooper, Ken Boothe, Delroy Wilson, Carlene Davis, Tinga Stewart and others.

His 1966 song, "Free Soul" with the Soul Brothers was interpolated in the 2006 Lily Allen song, "Smile".

In 2013, Mittoo was referenced by Superchunk in their song "Me & You & Jackie Mittoo" from their album I Hate Music.

His pioneering role and importance to reggae music in Canada, along with recordings of his performances on CBC-TV, was featured on the 2018 documentary series From the Vaults on CBC.

In 2024, Mittoo's album Macka Fat was named the jury winner of the Slaight Family Polaris Heritage Prize at the 2024 Polaris Music Prize.

== Discography ==
=== Albums ===
- Jackie Mittoo in London (Coxsone, 1967)
- Evening Time (Coxsone, 1968) – with The Soul Vendors
- Keep on Dancing (Coxsone, 1969)
- Jackie Mittoo Now (Studio One, 1970) (also released on Bamboo label)
- Macka Fat (Studio One, 1970)
- Wishbone (Summus, 1971)
- Reggae Magic (Studio One, 1972) (also released on Canadian Talent Library label)
- Let's Put It All Together (United Artists LA442-G, 1975) (also released on Birchmount label)
- Showcase (Studio One, 1976)
- Hot Blood (Third World, 1977)
- Show Case Volume 3 (Abraham, 1977) (also released as The Jackie Mittoo Showcase on Sonic Sounds label)
- In Cold Blood (Third World, 1978) (also released on Justice label)
- The Keyboard King (Third World, 1978) (also released on Weed Beat label)
- Anthology of Reggae Collectors Series, Vol. 4 (United Artists LA804-H, 1978)
- The Money Makers (A Jackie Mittoo Music Production, 1979)
- Stepping Tiger (Rite Sound Inc., 1979)
- Wild Jockey (Wackies, 1989) (also released as Jackie Mittoo At Wackies on Alpha Enterprise label)

=== Compilation albums ===
- The Original (Third World, 1978)
- Moving Away (Live And Love, 1979) – with Jah Stitch
- Plays Hits From Studio One And More (Rhino, 1991) – with Winston Wright
- Love And Harmony (Rhino, 1994) – with Jah Stitch (reissue of Moving Away)
- Tribute To Jackie Mittoo (Heartbeat, 1995)
- Keyboard Legend (Sonic Sounds, 1995)
- Jackie Mittoo in Africa (Quartz, 1997)
- Showcase: Striker Lee (Culture Press, 1997)
- The Keyboard King at Studio One (Universal Sound, 2000)
- Drum Song (Attack, 2003)
- Last Train To Skaville (Soul Jazz Records, 2003) – with The Soul Brothers
- Champion In The Arena 1976–1977 (Blood and Fire, 2003) (reissue of Show Case Volume 3 with bonus tracks)
- Jackie Mittoo Featuring Winston Wright At King Tubbys (Attack, 2004) – with Winston Wright
- Jah Rock Style (Grooving with the Keyboard King 1976–1978) (Trojan, 2005)
- Jackie Mittoo Rides On (Jamaican Recordings, 2008)

Featured guest appearance

- The Peacemaker's Chauffeur by Jason Wilson (Wheel Records, 2008)

Other...

- Mittoo was credited with playing "additional keyboards" on three tracks from Labour of Love by UB40 (Virgin, 1983)
