= Pama Records =

Record label

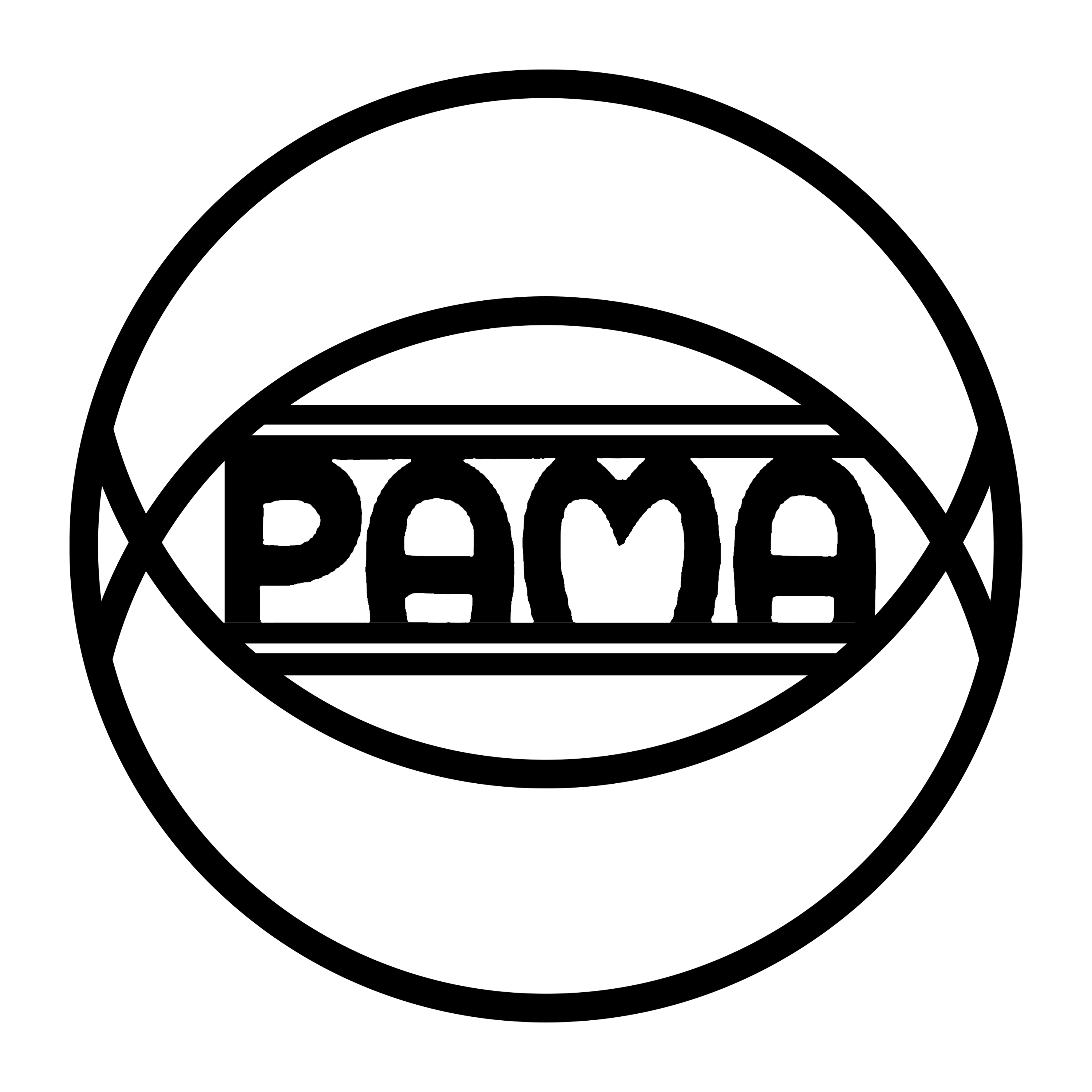
- Parent company: Phoenix Music International
- Founded: 1967
- Founder: Harry Palmer, Carl Palmer, Jeff Palmer
- Genre: Reggae, rocksteady, ska, soul, bluebeat
- Country of origin: United Kingdom
- Official website: www.pamarecords.co.uk

Pama Records is a British record label active during the 1960s and 1970s. Initially focused on soul music, it became one of the major outlets for reggae in the UK.

== Background ==
The label was set up by the Palmer Brothers – Harry, Jeff, and Carl – initially as a soul label, but later concentrating on Jamaican music, releasing rocksteady singles from 1967. Much of the label's output was licensed from Jamaican producers such as Clancy Eccles, Alton Ellis, Bunny Lee, and Lee "Scratch" Perry, although they also released music by local talents such as Junior English and Delroy Washington. Derrick Morgan became one of Pama's biggest stars, having a UK chart hit with "Moon Hop". Pama's biggest hit came with Max Romeo's "Wet Dream", which reached number 10 in the UK singles chart (despite lack of airplay, in part due to its risqué lyric), and sold over 250,000 copies.

The rivalry between Pama and their main UK reggae competitor, Trojan Records, was clear, with Trojan's Tighten Up series of compilations and Pama's similarly titled Straighten Up series going head to head. The rivalry had been fuelled by Bunny Lee's earlier licensing of Derrick Morgan's "Seven Letters" to both Pama and Trojan.

Pama introduced a number of subsidiary labels, often associated with individual producers, including Pama Supreme, Supreme, Crab, Bullet, Gas, Nu Beat/New Beat (Laurel Aitken), Success (Rupie Edwards), Camel, Escort, Unity (Bunny Lee), and Punch (Lee "Scratch" Perry).

In addition to the many reggae releases, the label also released a few non-reggae albums, including Butlins Red Coat Review, and an album commemorating the investiture of the Prince of Wales.

== History ==
The Crowns were a New York group consisting of Trevor Brown, Bunny Williams and Bobby Harris. They had an album, Made of Gold issued on Pama Records PMLP6 in 1968. They covered the Mighty Hannibal song, "Jerking the Dog". Backed with and released on Pama PM 736, it was the Pama Record of the Week on 24 August 1968 issue of Melody Maker. Their record, "She Ain't Gonna Do Right" bw "I Need Your Lovin" was released on Pama Records PM 745 in 1968. It received a brief mediocre review in the 4 January 1969 issue of Record Mirror, where the reviewer said that it wasn't anything special, it was "bouncy, bluesy and okay." In 1969, they recorded their version of the Chambers Brothers single, "Call Me" which was written by Joe and Willie Chambers.

Lloyd Chalmers recorded the song "Desiderata" which was backed with an instrumental version and released on Pama Supreme PS 355 in 1972.

The Pama label lasted until the mid-1970s, at which point Carl Palmer was the driving force, and concentrated on establishing a UK distribution network for reggae, later resurfacing as Jet Star, one of the largest distributors of reggae music. Pama Records is now owned by Phoenix Music International who continue to distribute the Pama label digitally.
