= Reggae Gi Dem Dub =

Studio album by Big Youth
- Released: 1978
- Studio: Harry J Studios
- Genre: Reggae
- Label: Nicola Delita

Big Youth chronology
Hit the Road Jack (1976)	Reggae Gi Dem Dub (1978)	Isaiah First Prophet Of Old (1978)

Reggae gi dem Dub is a studio album by Jamaican reggae artist Big Youth. It was recorded at the Harry J studio in Kingston, Jamaica.

== Track listing ==
1. "Inside Out" (4:20)
2. "Camp David Summit" (4:08)
3. "New Moon" (3:36)
4. "Tribute to Kenyatta" (4:25)
5. "Colour Red" (4:14)
6. "Progress (Part Two)" (3:20)
7. "Majority Rules" (4:03)
8. "Fulfilment" (3:44)

== Personnel ==
- Big Youth - vocals, arrangement, percussion
- Sylvan Morris - engineering, mixing
- Carlton "Santa" Davis - drums
- George "Fully" Fullwood - bass
- Tony Chin - rhythm guitar
- Earl "Chinna" Smith - lead guitar
- Keith McLeod - keyboards
- David Madden - trumpet
- Arnold Breckenridge - trumpet
- Vin Gordon - trombone
- Deadly Headly - alto saxophone
- Glen Da Costa - tenor saxophone
- Skully - percussion
- Keith Sterling - percussion
- Jimmy Becker - harmonica

== Recording Information ==
- Recording : Harry J Studio (Kingston, JA)
- Engineer : Sylvan Morris
- Mixing Engineer : Big Youth & Sylvan Morris
- Arranger : Big Youth
