= Natty Universal Dread 1973–1979 =

Box set by Big Youth
- Released: 2001
- Recorded: 1973–1979
- Genre: Reggae
- Length: 2:45:57
- Label: Blood & Fire
- Producer: Devon Russell

Big Youth chronology
Save the children (1995)	Natty Universal Dread 1973–1979 (2001)

Professional ratings
Review scores
Source	Rating
AllMusic	4.5/5 stars
Robert Christgau	A−
Entertainment Weekly	A

Natty Universal Dread 1973–1979 is a 3-CD-Box-set by Big Youth, released in 2001.

It was named as one of the best reissues of the year by Spin magazine.

== Track listing ==
All tracks composed by Manley Buchanan; except where indicated

=== CD1: Hot Stock 1973 ===
1. "Chucky No Lucky"
2. "Waterhouse Rock"
3. "Hot Cross Bun"
4. "Roll River Jordan" (Sugar Minott)
5. "Children Children"
6. "Mr. Buddy"
7. "Hot Stock"
8. "Downtown Kingston Pollution"
9. "Hell Is for Heroes"
10. "African Daughter"
11. "Things in the Light"
12. "Sky Juice"
13. "Not Long Ago"
14. "Is Dread in a Babylon"
15. "I Pray Thee Continually"
16. "Streets in Africa"

=== CD2: Reggae Phenomenon 1973–1975 ===
1. "Give Praises"
2. "Mama Look"
3. "Reggae Phenomenon"
4. "Battle of the Giants, Part 1"
5. "Battle of the Giants, Part 2"
6. "Plead I Cause"
7. "Hip Ki Do"
8. "Riverton City2
9. "Love and Happiness" (Al Green, Mabon "Teenie" Hodges)
10. "Weeping in the Night (Joy in the Morning)"
11. "Every Nigger Is a Star"
12. "My Time" (Buchanan, Gregory Isaacs)
13. "Natty Universal Dread"
14. "Jim Screechy"

=== CD3: Hotter Fire 1975–1979 ===
1. "Messiah Garvey" (Extended)
2. "Wolf In Sheep Clothing" (Version 1)
3. "Wolf In Sheep Clothing" (Version 2)
4. "Keep Your Dread" (Phil Pratt)
5. "I Light and I Salvation"
6. "Hit the Road Jack" (Percy Mayfield)
7. Leroy Smart & Big Youth – "Keep On Trying"
8. "Jah Man of Syreen"
9. "Dread High Ranking"
10. "Hotter Fire"
11. "Miss Lou Ring a Ding"
12. "Same Something"
13. "Dread Is the Best"
14. "Ten Against One"
15. "River Boat"
16. Junior Byles & Big Youth – "Sugar, Sugar" (Chuck Willis, Andy Kim, Jeff Barry)
17. "The Wise Sheep"
18. "Jah Jah Love Them" (Extended)
19. "The Upful One"
20. "Can't Take Wah Happen on a West"
21. "Political Confusion"

== Personnel ==
- Big Youth – Main Performer, Vocals, Percussion
- Musicians – Soul Syndicate, Big Youth Orchestra, Negusa Nagast All Stars, The Ark Angels
- Bass – George "Fully" Fullwood, Jackie Jackson
- Drums – Carlton "Santa" Davis
- Rhythm Guitar – Tony Chin
- Lead Guitar – Earl "Chinna" Smith as Mmelchezidek
- Keyboard – Keith McLeod, Earl "Wire" Lindo
- Piano – Keith Sterling
- Trombone – Vin Gordon
- Alto Saxophone – "Deadly" Headley Bennett, Herman Marquis
- Tenor Saxophone – Glen DaCosta
- Trumpet – David Madden, Arnold Brackenridge, Bobby Ellis
- Harmonica – Jimmy Becker
- Percussion – Noel "Skully" Simms, Keith Sterling, Sylvan Morris, Uziah "Sticky" Thompson, Big Youth
- Backing Vocals – Barry Llewellyn, Earl Morgan, Leroy Sibbles, I Threes, Gregory Isaacs, Garnett Mirriam

== Recording Information ==
- Recording: Harry J Studio, Kingston, Jamaica & Joe Gibbs Studio, Kingston, Jamaica & Randy's, Kingston, Jamaica

== Other information ==
All tracks produced by Manley Augustus Buchanan a.k.a. Big Youth except:

- CD1, tracks 1 & 2 produced by Joel Gibson
- CD3, track 1 produced by Jimmy Lindo
- CD3, track 4 produced by Phil Pratt
