= Progress (Big Youth album) =

Studio album by Big Youth
- Released: 1979
- Genre: Reggae
- Label: Nicola Delita
- Producer: Big Youth

Big Youth chronology
Isaiah First Prophet Of Old (1978)	Progress (1979)	Rock Holy (1980)

Professional ratings
Review scores
Source	Rating
Christgau's Record Guide	A−

== Track listing ==
1. "Hurting Inside"
2. "Green Bay Killing"
3. "Suffering as The Poor Man Cry"
4. "Truth and Rights"
5. "Progress"
6. "Pope Paul Feel It"
7. "African Do Deh"
8. "Red Dress Lady"
9. "The Fullness Thereof"
10. "Stepping Out a Babylon"

== Personnel ==
- Vocals : Big Youth
- Backing Vocals : Barry Llewellyn, Earl Morgan, Marcia Griffiths, Garnett Mirriam, Rita Marley
- Drums : Carlton "Santa" Davis
- Bass : George "Fully" Fullwood
- Rhythm Guitar : Tony Chin
- Lead Guitar : Earl "Chinna" Smith
- Keyboards : Keith McLeod
- Tenor Saxophone : Glen Da Costa
- Trombone : Vin Gordon
- Trumpet : David Madden, Arnold Breckenridge
- Alto Saxophone : Headley Bennett
- Percussions : Skully, Keith Sterling
- Harmonica : Jimmy Becker

== Recording Information ==
- Recording : Harry J Studio (Kingston, JA)
- Engineer : Sylvan Morris
- Mixing Engineer : Big Youth & Sylvan Morris
- Arranger : Big Youth
