= Triston Palma =

Jamaican singer (born 1962)

- Born: 1962 (age 63–64)
- Origin: Kingston, Jamaica
- Genres: Reggae
- Instrument: Vocals
- Years active: 1970-present

Triston Palma (born 1962) is a Jamaican reggae singer/deejay. He has been active since the mid-1970s.

== Biography ==
Palma was born in 1961 and grew up in the Waltham Park area of Kingston, and decided from an early age that he wanted to be a singer. He began by singing to the accompaniment of Soul Syndicate guitarist Tony Chin. His first recording was "Love Is A Message" for producer Bunny Lee when he was eight years old, which was followed by "A-Class Girl" for the Black Solidarity label, which was co-run by Palma and Ossie Thomas.

Palma made a major breakthrough with his performance in 1979 at the General Penitentiary Memorial Concert for Claudie Massop, which also featured Bob Marley. At one point in the early 1980s, Palma had nine songs in Jamaica's Top 40. They included his biggest career hit, the dancehall influenced "Entertainment" produced by Nkrumah Jah Thomas and using a reworking of the rhythm from Vin Gordon's "Heavenless". Palma became a popular artist in the "singjay" style in the early 1980s. enjoying further successes with Jah Thomas including: "Water Bubbling", "Spliff Tail", "Raving", "Touch Me, Take Me" and "Run Around Woman".

Palma has worked with Linval Thompson, who produced his Joker Lover and Settle Down Girl albums, and also George Phang, Tony Robinson, Sugar Minott, Bunny Gemini, and Castro Brown.

In the mid-1980s, Palma became involved in the famine-relief charity project Music is Life, along with Freddie McGregor, Mutabaruka, Gregory Isaacs, Third World, Edi Fitzroy, and Steel Pulse, contributing to the charity single "Land of Africa". His popularity continued through the 1980s with dancehall hits that included "Lick Shot", a track that utilized rhythms by Robbie Shakespeare and Sly Dunbar, and in the 1990s he recorded the Three Against War song and album with Dennis Brown and Beenie Man.

Palma has worked as a producer himself, working with artists such as Phillip Frazer, Josey Wales, and Robert Ffrench, and has provided backing vocals for singers such as Sugar Minott, Tony Tuff, and Freddie McGregor. He also built his own Star Creation studio.

== Discography ==
=== Albums ===
- Presenting Triston Palma (1981) Black Roots
- Fancyness (1982) Gorgon
- Joker Lover (1982) Jah Guidance
- Showcase In A Roots Radics Drum & Bass (1982) Midnight Rock/Vista Sounds/Gorgon
- Joker Smoker (1982) Greensleeves/Clocktower
- Touch Me, Take Me (1982) Midnight Rock/Vista Sounds/A&A
- Nice Time (1982) Jam Rock (with Toyan)
- Entertainment (1982) Midnight Rock
- Settle Down Girl (1983) Trojan
- The Big Showdown (1984) Black Solidarity (Trison Palma and Phillip Frazer)
- Triston Palma Meets Early B The Doctor (198?) Fantastique (Garrick Robertson Triston Palma and Early B)
- I and I and Inity (198?) Drum & Bass (with Philip Frazer)
- Wounded (1989) Bungem
- The Best of (198?) Rohit
- Three Against War (1995) VP (with Dennis Brown and Beenie Man)
- Triston Palmer Meets Jah Thomas Inna Disco Style (1996) Munich/Majestic
- Born Naked (1997) I&I Foundation
- On The Attack Blue Mountain
- Wounded Bungem
- Spliff Tail Black Solidarity
- Triston Palma Meets Michael Palmer Midnight Rock (with Michael Palmer)
- Two Roads (2000) Easy Star

Contributing artist

- The Rough Guide to Reggae (1997) World Music Network

=== Singles ===
- "Melissa" (1982) JR 7"
- "My Father Love" Vasco 7"
- "Spliff Tail" Black Solidarity 7"
- "Another Girl" with Phillip Frazier Solidarity International 7"
- "Ghetto Vibes" I&I Foundation 7"
- "The Struggle" with Norris Man I&I Foundation 7"
- "Can't Let Them Do That" (1997) Artistic 7"
- "Jah Is In Charge" (1997) Ruff Stock 7"
- "Cuss Cuss" (1997) Massive B 7"
- "Original Fussing & Fighting" (1998) Ranking Joe 7"
- "Sweet Reggae Music" "Corner Stone 12"
