= The Rough Guide to Dub =

2005 compilation album by various artists

Compilation album by Various artists
- Released: 15 March 2005
- Genres: World, dub
- Length: 66:27
- Label: World Music Network

Full series chronology
The Rough Guide to Irish Music (2005)	The Rough Guide to Dub (2005)	The Rough Guide to Celia Cruz (2005)

The Rough Guide to Dub is a world music compilation album originally released in 2005. Part of the World Music Network Rough Guides series, the release covers the roots of dub music, focusing on the period 1973–1980. Curation was performed by Steve Barrow, co-founder of the record label Blood and Fire, who also compiled The Rough Guide to Reggae and authored its companion book. Phil Stanton, co-founder of the World Music Network, produced the work.

== Critical reception ==
Professional ratings
Review scores
Source	Rating
AllMusic	4/5 stars
PopMatters	9/10 stars
Robert Christgau	A–

The album received universal acclaim upon release. Writing for PopMatters, John Bergstrom described it as "the most essential single-disc, multi-artist collection of dub music to be issued to date." Bergstrom's observation that King Tubby and his circle dominate the track-listing was echoed by XLR8R's Jesse Serwer. In the same vein, Rick Anderson of AllMusic pointed out that the tracks come from the vaults of re-issuing label Blood and Fire, causing the album to overlook artists like Augustus Pablo and Scientist, but nonetheless recommended the album. Robert Christgau hit the same note, calling it "less inclusive than the title suggests", but praised the accessibility, a point mirrored by the Sydney Morning Herald's Bruce Elder, who also applauded the recording's "edginess" and "richness".

== Track listing ==
No.	Title	Artist	Length
1.	"Ordinary Version Chapter 3"	ET & Randy's All Stars	2:52
2.	"Satia"	Keith Hudson Meets King Tubby	3:09
3.	"Conquering Dub"	Yabby You Meets King Tubby	3:20
4.	"Lightning & Thunder"	Morwell Unlimited Meet King Tubby's	3:35
5.	"Shooter Dub"	King Tubby & Santic All Stars	3:01
6.	"Behold a Dub"	Amanda All Stars & King Tubby	3:26
7.	"Chapter of Money"	Aggrovators Meet Prince Jammy	2:54
8.	"Satta Dread Dub"	Aggrovators Meet Prince Philip	2:35
9.	"Repatriation Rock"	King Tubby Meets Vivian Jackson	3:25
10.	"World Dub: Away With the Bad"	King Tubby Meets God Children Band	3:33
11.	"Dub Zone"	Ja-Man All Stars Meet King Tubby	2:39
12.	"Wire Dub"	ET Meets Skin, Flesh & Bones	2:34
13.	"Noah Sugar Pan"	Upsetters	3:29
14.	"No Problem"	Horace Andy Meets Prince Jammy	3:49
15.	"Dub the Right Way"	King Tubby & Soul Syndicate	2:42
16.	"Down Rhodesia"	Inner Circle Meets Maximillian At Channel One	3:36
17.	"Zambia Dub"	King Tubby & Yabby You	3:32
18.	"Moses Dub"	Revolutionaries	3:36
19.	"Nuclear Bomb"	Revolutionaries	3:48
20.	"General Version"	Dennis Brown Presents Prince Jammy	4:52
