= Screaming Target =

Studio album by Big Youth
- Released: 1972
- Recorded: 1972
- Studio: Randy's Studio; Dynamic Sound Studios; Harry J's Recording Studio, Kingston, Jamaica
- Genre: Reggae
- Length: 37:59
- Label: Gussie/Jaguar/Trojan
- Producer: Augustus "Gussie" Clarke

Big Youth chronology
Chi Chi Run (1972)	Screaming Target (1972)	Reggae Phenomenon (1975)

Screaming Target is the debut album by Jamaican deejay Big Youth. It was recorded and released in 1972 on the Gussie and Jaguar labels in Jamaica. It was issued in the United Kingdom in 1973 by Trojan Records.

== Recording and production ==
The album was produced by Big Youth's childhood friend Augustus "Gussie" Clarke. Some of the tracks on the album had previously been hits as singles, including "Screaming Target", which used K.C. White's "No, No, No" rhythm, "Tippertone Rock" (though the single version was different), and "The Killer". Several other tracks employed rhythms from Clarke's other productions, including Leroy Smart's "Pride & Ambition" (on "Pride & Joy Rock"), Lloyd Parks' "Slaving" ("Honesty"), Dennis Brown's "In Their Own Way" ("Be Careful"), and Gregory Isaacs' "One One Cocoa Fill Basket" (on "One of These Fine Days"). The 2006 CD reissue adds the aforementioned tracks and more as a bonus.

== Critical reception ==
Professional ratings
Review scores
Source	Rating
AllMusic	5/5 stars
The Encyclopedia of Popular Music	5/5 stars
Okayplayer	4.5/5 stars

The album was a favourite dub LP for music critic Robert Christgau in the 1970s, although he omitted it from Christgau's Record Guide: Rock Albums of the Seventies (1981), lacking the comprehensiveness for import-only albums at the time.

== Track listing ==
All tracks written, arranged, and produced by Gussie Clarke.

Original Gussie release
No.	Title	Length
1.	"Screaming Target"
2.	"Pride & Joy Rock"
3.	"Be Careful"
4.	"Tippertone Rock"
5.	"One of These Fine Days"
6.	"The Killer"
7.	"Solomon a Gunday"
8.	"Honesty"
9.	"I am Alright"
10.	"Lee a Low"

The track "Tippertone Rock" is listed as "Tippertong Rock" on the cover of the 1973 Trojan Records release (TRLS 61-A), while it's listed as "Tippertone Rock" on the vinyl LP itself. Later releases added "Screaming Target (Version 2)" (as track 6) and "Concrete Jungle" (as track 12). The 1976 Gussie LP releases only added "Concrete Jungle" (as track 11).

2006 CD release bonus tracks
No.	Title	Performer(s)	Length
11.	"KG's Halfway Tree"	Augustus Pablo & The Simplicity People
12.	"Origin Style"	Augustus Pablo
13.	"Screaming Target [version 2]"
14.	"Pride and Ambition"	Leroy Smart
15.	"In Their Own Way"	Dennis Brown
16.	"Try Me"	Roman Stewart
17.	"Tipper Tone Rocking [version 2]"
18.	"Rhythm Style"	The Simplicity People
19.	"One One Cocoa Full Basket"	Gregory Isaacs
20.	"Skylarking [version]"	The Society Squad
21.	"Anywhere But Nowhere [version]"	The Simplicity People
22.	"Slaving (Every Day)"	Lloyd Parks
23.	"No More Slavery"	Glen Brown
24.	"I am Alright (aka Loving Pauper)"	Gregory Isaacs

== Credits ==
- Vocals : Big Youth
- Backing vocals : Dennis Brown, Gregory Isaacs, K.C. White

== Recording Information ==
- Recording : Dynamic Sounds (Kingston, JA) & Randy's (Kingston, JA) & Harry J (Kingston, JA)
- Engineers : Karl Pitterson & Sid Bucknor & Errol Thompson
