= Carlton "Santa" Davis =

Jamaican musician

Carlton Davis
- Also known as: Santa, Santa Davis
- Born: Carlton Sylvester Davis; 21 November 1953 (age 72); Kingston, Jamaica
- Genres: Reggae, ska, rocksteady
- Occupations: Drummer, songwriter
- Instruments: Drums, vocals
- Website: santadavis.com

Carlton Sylvester "Santa" Davis (born 21 November 1953) is a musician from Jamaica, primarily known for his drumming with bands such as Bob Marley and the Wailers, the Aggrovators, Soul Syndicate and Roots Radics. He has worked with reggae artists such as Jimmy Cliff, Black Uhuru, Burning Spear, Big Youth, the Wailers, Peter Tosh, Andrew Tosh, Wailing Souls, Ini Kamoze, Big Mountain, Michael Rose, and Ziggy Marley.

== Biography ==
Davis was born in the Greenwich Farm area of Kingston. He got his "Santa" nickname as a result of a skating accident which left his face swollen and red. At the age of ten he began playing in his local Catholic church marching band, staying with them for the next five years. During his time there he was tutored in the rocksteady beat by Bobby Aitken. At the age of fourteen he joined The Graduates, a nightclub band which also featured Earl "Wire" Lindo (later of the Wailers), Richard Daley (later of Third World, and Earl "Bagga" Walker.

Davis joined his friend George "Fully" Fullwood in the Rhythm Raiders in 1969, the band soon changing its name to Soul Syndicate. He was also the drummer in Bunny Lee's studio band the Aggrovators during the 1970s. Davis helped popularise the "flying cymbals" sound through his drumming on Johnny Clarke's 1974 recording "None Shall Escape the Judgement". Although the hi-hat pattern had appeared in earlier Jamaican recordings, Davis's performance and its subsequent mixing by King Tubby helped establish it as a prominent sound in mid-1970s reggae. Davis also played in the Roots Radics.

In 1978, Carlton "Santa" Davis made a brief cameo in Ted Bafaloukos's film Rockers, where he appears playing drums at Harry J's Recording Studio for Kiddus I. Additionally, he was part of the Rockers All Stars, the group responsible for creating the film's instrumental music.

In the 1980s he played on Bob Marley and the Wailers' Survival Uprising and Confrontation albums on "Africa Unite", "Coming in from the Cold" and "Chantdown Babylon" and also in Peter Tosh's band, and was injured during the shooting in which Tosh was murdered.

He later joined Big Mountain.

He has also recorded with many non-reggae major artists such as Isaac Hayes, Carlos Santana, Chaka Khan, Pink, Eddie Griffin, Champa on their debut album and Willie Nelson on his album Countryman in 2005.

At present, Santa is the official drummer for Ziggy Marley and Ginger Roots and the Protectors.

== Solo discography ==
- Adrenalina (1997), Sarzo
- Da Zone (2008), Iya Vybz
- Watch You Livity (2015), Carlton "Santa" Davis Label

== Partial musical career (1970 to 1985) ==
=== Drums ===
- Abyssinians – Arise [1978]
- Abyssinians – Forward [1969–76]
- African Brothers – Want Some Freedom [1970–78]
- African Brothers & King Tubby – The African Brothers Meets King Tubby in Dub [197X]
- Aggrovators – Dub Justice [1975–76]
- Aggrovators – Reggae Stones Dub [1976]
- Aggrovators & King Tubby's – Dub Jackpot [1974–76]
- Aggrovators & King Tubby & Bunny Lee – Bionic Dub [1975–77]
- Aggrovators & Revolutionaries – Rockers Almighty Dub [1979]
- Agrovators Meet Revolutionaries – Agrovators Meet Revolutionaries Part II [197X]
- Agrovators Meets The Revolutioners – Agrovators Meets The Revolutioners at Channel One Studios [1977]
- Al Campbell – Ain't That Loving You [1978]
- Al Campbell – Late Night Blues [1980]
- Al Campbell – Loving Moods of Al Campbell [1978]
- Al Campbell – Working Man [1980]
- Anna Fisher & Friends – Tribute For Salvation [2013]
- Augustus Clarke – Black Foundation Dub [1976]
- Augustus Pablo – Authentic Golden Melodies [1974–79]
- Augustus Pablo – Earth Rightful Ruler [1982]
- Augustus Pablo – Original Rockers Vol. 2 [1989]
- B.B. Seaton – Dancing Shoes [1974]
- B.B. Seaton – I'm Aware of Love [1979]
- Barrington Levy – Barrington Levy in Dub [1979]
- Barrington Levy – Englishman [1979]
- Barrington Levy – Hunter Man [1983]
- Barrington Levy – Place Too Dark [198X]
- Barry Brown – Showcase [1980]
- Barry Brown – Step It Up Youthman [1978]
- Big Youth – Live at Reggae Sunsplash [1984]
- Big Youth – Progress [1979]
- Big Youth – Reggae Gi Dem Dub [1978]
- Big Youth – Rock Holy [1980]
- Bim Sherman – Crucial Cuts Vol 2 [1979–84]
- Bim Sherman – Lovers Leap Showcase [1979]
- Black Sounds Uhro – Love Crisis [1977]
- Bob Marley and the Wailers – "Uprising [1980]
- Bob Marley and the Wailers – "Confrontation" [1983] [2001]
- Buro Banton – Buro [1983]
- Cedric Myton & Congos – Face The Music [1981]
- Clint Eastwood – Sex Education [1980]
- Clint Eastwood & General Saint – Two Bad D.J. [1981]
- Congo – Congo Ashanti [1979]
- Cornell Campbell – Dance in a Greenwich Farm [1975]
- Cornell Campbell – Fight Against Corruption [1983]
- Cornell Campbell – My Destination [197X]
- Cornell Campbell – Stalowatt [1976]
- Cornell Campbell – What's Happening To Me [1982]
- Dave & Ansel Collins – Double Barrel [1971]
- David Isaacs – Love & Devotion [198X]
- Delroy Williams – I Stand Black [1984]
- Delroy Wilson – For I And I [1975]
- Delroy Wilson – Hit After Hit After Hit [1984]
- Delroy Wilson – Nice Times [1983]
- Delroy Wilson – True Believer in Love [197X]
- Delroy Wilson – True Believer in Love [197X]
- Dennis Brown – Joseph's Coat of Many Colours [1979]
- Dennis Brown – The Promised Land [1977–79]
- Derrick Morgan Featuring Hortense Ellis – Feel So Good [1975]
- Dillinger – Cup of Tea [1980]
- Dillinger – Join The Queue [1983]
- Dillinger – Marijuana in My Brain [1979]
- Don Carlos – Inna Dub Style [1979–80]
- Don Carlos – Spread Out [1983]
- Earl Chinna Smith – Dub It [1983]
- Earl Chinna Smith – Sticky Fingers [1977]
- Earl Sixteen – Reggae Sound [1981]
- Earl Sixteen – Shining Star [1983]
- Earl Zero – Visions of Love [1979]
- Earth & Stone – Kool Roots [1976–78]
- Errol Dunkley – Profile of Errol Dunkley [1980]
- Flick Wilson – School Days [197X]
- Freddie McGregor – Come on Over [1983]
- Freddie McGregor – Rhythm So Nice [1983]
- Glen Brown & King Tubby – Termination Dub [1973–79]
- Glenmore Brown – Dub From The South East [1972]
- Gregory Isaacs – The Best of Vol 2 [1981]
- Horace Andy – Pure Ranking [1979]
- Hugh Mundell – Africa Must Be Free By 1983 [1978]
- Hugh Mundell – The Blessed Youth [1978–81]
- Hugh Mundell – Time And Place [1980]
- Hugh Mundell Featuring Lacksley Castell – Jah Fire [1980]
- I Roy – African Herbsman [1979]
- I Roy – Can't Conquer Rasta [1976]
- I Roy – Heart of a Lion [1977]
- I Roy – Truths And Rights [1975]
- Jackie Edwards – 20 Greatest Hits [1975–77]
- Jackie Edwards – The Original "Mr. Cool Ruler" [1983]
- Jacob Miller – I'm Just A Dread [197X]
- Jah Frankie Jones – Satta An Praise Jah [1977]
- Jah Stitch – No Dread Can't Dead [1976]
- Jah Stitch – Original Ragga Muffin [1975–77]
- Jah Woosh & Sis Bee – Rebellion [1981]
- Jimmy Cliff – In Concert [1976]
- Jimmy Cliff – Special [1982]
- Joe Gibbs – African Dub Chapter 2 [1976]
- Joe Gibbs & Professionals Featuring Errol Thompson – No Bones for the Dogs [1974–79]
- John Holt – Super Star [1978]
- John Holt – Treasure of Love [1977]
- Johnny Clarke – Dread Natty Congo [1977]
- Johnny Clarke – Moving Out [1975]
- Johnny Clarke – Originally Mr Clarke [1980]
- Johnny Clarke – Put It On [1975]
- Johnny Clarke – Rockers Time Now [1976]
- Johnny Clarke – Sings in Fine Style [1975]
- Johnny Clarke – Superstar Roots Disco Dub [1977]
- Johnny Clarke & Delroy Wilson & Doreen Shaffer – Lovers Rock Vol 2 [197X]
- Johnny Osbourne – Folly Ranking [1980]
- Junior Byles – Jordan [1976]
- Junior Delgado – Bush Master Revolution [1982]
- Junior Delgado – More She Love It [1981]
- K.C. White – Try A Little Happiness [1982]
- K.C. White – Try A Little Happiness [198X]
- Keith Hudson – Torch of Freedom [1975]
- Keith Hudson & Various Artists – Shades of Hudson [197X]
- Keith Poppin – More of Keith Poppin [1979]
- King Sounds – Come Zion Side Happiness [1979]
- King Tubby – African Love Dub [1974–79]
- King Tubby – Answer The Dub [197X]
- King Tubby – Dub From The Roots [1974]
- King Tubby – Dub Like Dirt [1975–77]
- King Tubby – Dub Mix Up [1975–79]
- King Tubby – King Tubby's Lost Treasures [1976]
- King Tubby – Majestic Dub [197X]
- King Tubby – The Roots of Dub [1975]
- King Tubby & Errol Thompson – The Black Foundation in Dub [197X]
- King Tubby & Friends – Rod of Correction Showcase [197X]
- King Tubby & Jacob Miller – E-E Saw Dub [1975]
- King Tubby & Prince Jammy – Dub Gone 2 Crazy [1975–79]
- King Tubby Meets Scientist – In A Midnight Rock Dub Vol 1 [1983]
- King Tubby & Soul Syndicate – Freedom Sounds in Dub [1976–79]
- Knowledge – Judgement [1980]
- Knowledge – Straight Outta Trenchtown [1975–80]
- Leroy Sibbles – Now [1980]
- Leroy Smart – Leroy Smart & Friends [1976–78]
- Leroy Smart – Superstar [1977]
- Leslie Butler – Ja-Gan [1975]
- Linval Thompson – Cool Down [1974–76]
- Linval Thompson – Six Babylon [1979]
- Linval Thompson & Friends – Whip Them King Tubby [197X]
- Little John – Early Days [198X]
- Lone Ranger – M 16 [1982]
- Lord Tanamo – Calypso Reggae [1979]
- Max Romeo – Crazy World of Dub [197X]
- Max Romeo – Perilous Time [1974–1999]
- Max Romeo – Revelation Time [1975]
- Meditations – Guidance [1978]
- Michael Prophet – Consciousness [1979–80]
- Michael Prophet – Gun Man [1983]
- Mighty Diamonds – Leaders of Black Country [1983]
- Mighty Diamonds – Stand Up To Your Judgment [1978]
- Mikey Dread – African Anthem [1979]
- Mikey Dread – Dread at the Controls [1979]
- The Morwells – Cool Runnings [1979]
- Morwells – Kingston 12 Toughie [1980]
- Nathan Skyers – Dem A Fight I [1983]
- Nicodemus Junior – Snakes And Ladders [1983]
- Niney The Observer – Observer Attack Dub [1969–76]
- Nuroy & Uroy – The Originator [1976]
- Owen Gray – Forward on the Scene [1975]
- Paragons – Now [1982]
- Paragons – Return [198X]
- Pat Kelly – Give Love A Try [1978]
- Pat Kelly – Lonely Man [1978]
- Peter Metro & Captain Sinbad With Little John – Sinbad & The Metric System [1983]
- Peter Ranking & General Lucky – Jah Standing Over Me [1982]
- Peter Tosh – Equal Rights [1977]
- Peter Tosh – Mama Africa [1983]
- Peter Tosh – No Nuclear War [1987]
- Phillip Frazer – Blood of the Saint [1982]
- Prince Alla – Only Love Can Conquer [1976–79]
- Prince Alla – The Best of Prince Alla [1981]
- Prince Alla & Junior Ross – I Can Hear The Children Singing [1976–79]
- Prince Far I – Cry Tuff Dub Encounter II [1979]
- Prince Far I – Health & Strength [1978–79]
- Prince Far I – Long Life [1978]
- Prince Far I – Message From The King [1977]
- Prince Jammy – Fatman vrs. Shaka in a Dub Conference [1980]
- Prince Jammy – Kamikazi Dub [1979]
- Ranking Dellinger – Superstar [1977]
- Ranking Joe – Saturday Night Jamdown Style [1980]
- Ras Michael & Sons of Negus – Disarmament [1981]
- Ras Michael & Sons of Negus – Rastafari [1975]
- Ras Michael & Sons of Negus – Revelation [1982]
- Ras Midas – Stand Up Wise Up [1984]
- Revolutionaries – Revolutionaries Sounds Vol 2 [1976]
- Rod Taylor – Where Is Your Love Mankind [1980]
- Roots Radics Meet Soul Syndicate – Roots Radics Meet Soul Syndicate in Dub [198X]
- Royals – Dubbing with the Royals [197X]
- Royals – Pick Up The Pieces [1977]
- Rupie Edwards – Ire Feelings [1975]
- Sammy Dread – Early Days [198X]
- Scientist – Dub in the Roots Tradition [1976–79]
- Scientist – Dub Landing [1981]
- Scientist – Heavyweight Dub Champion [1980]
- Scientist – Scientific Dub [1978–80]
- Scientist – Scientist Meets The Space Invaders [1981]
- Scientist – Scientist Rids The World of the Evil Curse of the Vampires [1981]
- Scientist & Prince Jammy – Dub Landing Vol: 2 [1982]
- Scientist v. Prince Jammy – Big Showdown [1980]
- Slim Smith – The Very Best Of [196X-7X]
- Sly and the Revolutionaries With Jah Thomas – Black Ash Dub [1980]
- Sons of Jah – Reggae Hit Showcase [1980]
- Sons of Negus – Rastafari in Dub [1978]
- Soul Syndicate – Was, Is & Always [1980]
- Sugar Minott – African Girl [1981]
- Sugar Minott – Bitter Sweet [1979]
- Sylford Walker – Nutin Na Gwan [1975–79]
- Sylvan Morris – Morris on Dub [1975]
- Tappa Zukie – Deep Roots [197X-8X]
- Tappa Zukie – Tapper Zukie in Dub [1976]
- Tappa Zukie – Blackman [1978]
- The Agrovators – Jammies in Lion Dub Style [1978]
- Tommy McCook & Aggravators – Brass Rockers [1975]
- Tommy McCook & Aggrovators – Cookin [1975]
- Tommy McCook & Aggrovators – Disco Rockers [1977]
- Tony Tuff – From Tony Tuff To Lovers Everywhere [198X]
- Tony Tuff – Presenting Mr Tuff [1981]
- Toyan – Toyan [1982]
- Travellers – Black Black Minds [1977]
- U Black – Westbound Thing A Swing [1977]
- Uniques – Showcase [1978]
- Various Artists – 17 North Parade [1972–75]
- Various Artists – Down Santic Way [1973–75]
- Various Artists – Java Java Dub [1972]
- Various Artists – King Jammy in Roots [197X-8X]
- Various Artists – King of Dub [1977–79]
- Various Artists – Kingston All Stars Meet Downtown at King Tubbys [1972–75]
- Various Artists – Reggae All Star [1979]
- Various Artists – Roots of Dance Hall [197X]
- Various Artists – Sound System Rockers [1969–75]
- Various Artists – Sufferation [197X]
- Various Artists – Treasure Isle in Dub [1970–78]
- Wailing Souls – Wailing [1981]
- Wailing Souls – Wailing Souls at Channel One [197X]
- Welton Irie – Ghettoman Corner [1977]
- Willie Nelson – Countryman [2005]
- Willy Williams – Messenger Man [1980]
- Willy Williams – Unity [1986]
- Winston Jarrett – Wise Man [1979]
- Winston Wright – Melody of Love [1977]
- Yabby U – Jah Jah Way [1980]
- Yabby You – Chant Down Babylon Kingdom [1976]
- Yabby You – The Yabby You Collection [197X]
- Yabby You & King Tubby – King Tubby's Prophesy of Dub [1976]
- Yabby You & Various Artists – Jesus Dread [1972–77]
- Yellowman – Them A Mad Over Me [1982]
- Yellowman & Fathead – Bad Boy Skanking [1982]
- Ziggy Marley – Ziggy Marley Live in Concert [2013]

=== Backing vocals ===
- Oku Onuora& AK7 – Pressure Drop [1984]

=== Organ ===
- Oku Onuora & AK7 – Pressure Drop [1984]

=== Percussions ===
- Errol Dunkley – Profile of Errol Dunkley [1980]
