= The Chanting Dread Inna Fine Style =

Compilation album by Big Youth
- Released: 1983
- Genre: Reggae
- Length: 45:00
- Label: Heartbeat
- Producer: Devon Russell

Big Youth chronology
Some Great Big Youth (1981)	The Chanting Dread Inna Fine Style (1983)	Live at Reggae Sunsplash (1984)

The Chanting Dread Inna Fine Style is a 1983 compilation of singles tracks released by Big Youth on his Negusa Nagast label dating back as far as 1973 ("Street In Africa"). It followed the similarly-sourced Some Great Big Youth collection. Both albums were released by Heartbeat Records.

== Track listing ==
All tracks composed by Manley Buchanan; except where indicated

1. "My Time"
2. "Skyjuice"
3. "African Daughter"
4. "My Buddy"
5. "All Nations Bow" (Winston Riley)
6. "Salvation Light"
7. "Dread Inna Babylon"
8. "Mama Look"
9. "Streets in Africa"
10. "Jah Jah Shall Guide"
11. "Jah Jah Love Them"
12. "Jah Jah Golden Jubilee"
13. "Golden Dub"
14. "Who Laughed Last"

== Personnel ==
- Big Youth – vocals
- Earl "Chinna" Smith – guitar
- Lynford "Hux" Brown – guitar
- Tony Chin – rhythm guitar
- Radcliffe "Duggie" Bryan – guitar
- Earl "Wire" Lindo
- Augustus Pablo – keyboards
- Tyrone Downie – keyboards
- U. Malcolm – piano, organ
- J.J. Jackson, George Fullwood – bass
- Carlton "Santa" Davis – drums
- S. Martin, Carlton Barrett – drums
- Gregory Isaacs – background vocals
- Dennis Brown – background vocals
- The Heptones – background vocals
