= The Rough Guide to Reggae =

Compilation album by Various artists
- Released: 18 November 1997
- Genre: World, reggae
- Length: 71:58
- Label: World Music Network

Full series chronology
The Rough Guide to Flamenco (1997)	The Rough Guide to Reggae (1997)	The Rough Guide to Salsa (1997)

The Rough Guide to Reggae is a world music compilation album originally released in 1997. Part of the World Music Network Rough Guides series, the album broadly covers the reggae genre originating in Jamaica. The album was curated by Steve Barrow, who also wrote the namesake book, and later compiled The Rough Guide to Dub. Phil Stanton, co-founder of the World Music Network, was the producer.

== Critical reception ==
Professional ratings
Review scores
Source	Rating
Allmusic	4.5/5 stars

The album received positive reviews upon release. Writing for AllMusic, Keith Farley named it a "stellar introduction", pondering whether the exclusion of Bob Marley was a statement. Michaelangelo Matos of the Chicago Reader called the compilation "definitive", saying it could have been the "fifth disc" of the four-CD Tougher Than Tough box set.

== Track listing ==
No.	Title	Artist	Length
1.	"Broadway Jungle"	The Maytals (as 'The Flames')	2:50
2.	"Chinatown"	Don Drummond & The Skatalites	2:34
3.	"The Tide Is High"	The Paragons	2:45
4.	"Rivers of Babylon"	The Melodians	4:15
5.	"Too Late"	Augustus Pablo	3:16
6.	"Great Stone"	King Tubby & Soul Syndicate	3:10
7.	"Conquering Lion"	Yabby You & The Prophets	3:28
8.	"Slavery Days"	Burning Spear	3:25
9.	"Fisherman"	The Congos	6:03
10.	"Warrior Charge"	Aswad	5:48
11.	"Rough Neck"	Gregory Isaacs	6:53
12.	"This a Lover's Corner"	General Echo	4:47
13.	"Entertainment"	Triston Palmer	3:34
14.	"Cockney Translation"	Smiley Culture	3:10
15.	"We Can Work It Out"	Janet-Lee Davis & Peter Hunnigale	3:50
16.	"Living Dangerously"	Barrington Levy & Bounty Killer	3:30
17.	"Untold Stories"	Buju Banton	4:34
18.	"Slave"	Lucky Dube	4:06
