= Isaiah First Prophet of Old =

Studio album by Big Youth
- Released: 1978
- Genre: Reggae
- Length: 34:05
- Labels: Nicola Delita, Front Line
- Producer: Devon Russell

Big Youth chronology
| Hit the Road Jack (1976) | Isaiah First Prophet of Old (1978) | Progress (1979) |

Isaiah First Prophet of Old is an album by the Jamaican musician Big Youth, released in 1978. It was produced by Devon Russell.

== Critical reception ==
Professional ratings
Review scores
| Source | Rating |
|---|---|
| AllMusic | 2/5 stars |
| Robert Christgau | (1-star Honorable Mention) |
| The Encyclopedia of Popular Music | 3/5 stars |

LA Weekly wrote that the album "demonstrates that [Big Youth] is better off rapping than singing." Robert Christgau praised "World in Confusion". Trouser Press noted that "the groove is steady and appealing."

== Track listing ==
All tracks are written by Big Youth.

| No. | Title | Length |
|---|---|---|
| 1. | "World in Confusion" | 4:24 |
| 2. | "Writing on the Wall" | 4:31 |
| 3. | "Zion" | 4:07 |
| 4. | "Isaiah First Prophet of Old" | 5:30 |
| 5. | "Lord Jah Bless" | 4:10 |
| 6. | "Reaping Time" | 3:29 |
| 7. | "Love We a Deal With" | 4:13 |
| 8. | "Upful One" | 3:57 |

== Personnel ==
- Big Youth - Main Performer, Vocals, Percussion,
- Rita Marley - Vocals
- George Fullwood - Bass
- Carlton "Santa" Davis - Percussion, Drums
- Earl "Chinna" Smith - Guitar
- Earl Lindo - Clarinet, Keyboards, Organ
- Tony Chin - Guitar
- Vin Gordon - Trombone
- Sylvan Morris - Engineer, Percussion
- Errol Thompson - Engineer
- Keith Sterling - Piano
- Uziah "Sticky" Thompson - Percussion
- Scott Morris - Percussion
- Judy Mowatt - Vocals
- Herman Marquis - Saxophone
- Bobby Ellis - Trumpet

Recording

- Recording : Harry J Studio, Kingston, Jamaica & Joe Gibbs Studio, Kingston, Jamaica
- Engineer : Errol Thompson
