= Jah Stitch =

Jamaican musician (1949–2019)

- Born: Melbourne James; 27 July 1949; Kingston, Jamaica
- Origin: Kingston, Jamaica
- Died: 28 April 2019 (aged 69) Kingston, Jamaica
- Genres: Reggae
- Instrument: Vocals

Jah Stitch (born Melbourne James, 27 July 1949 – 28 April 2019) was a reggae deejay best known for his recordings in the 1970s.

== Biography ==
After an introduction to music singing in a yard with the likes of The Wailers, The Heptones, Roy Shirley, and Stranger Cole, James became well known in Jamaica by deejaying with the Lord Tippertone and Black Harmony sound systems, working as Jah Stitch. His debut single was the Errol Holt-produced "Danger Zone". Big Youth was an early influence on Stitch's deejay style and he had several hits working with producer Bunny Lee, with deejay versions of songs by Johnny Clarke, as well as tracks such as "African Queen" with Yabby You. Shortly before the One Love Peace Concert in 1976, Stitch survived being shot, providing the inspiration for "No Dread Can't Dead". His success in Jamaica continued and in 1977 he toured the United Kingdom.

In the mid-1980s, he worked as a selector on Sugar Minott's Youth Promotion sound system, now under the name Major Stitch.

He resumed his recording career in 1995, working with Trevor Douglas and Jah Woosh. His peak 1970s output for Bunny Lee and Yabby You was collected in 1996 by Blood and Fire on the Original Ragga Muffin (1975–77) compilation.

He died on 28 April 2019, aged 69.

== Albums ==
=== Studio albums ===
- No Dread Can't Dead (1976) Third World
- Watch Your Step Youthman (1977) Third World
- Straight to Babylon Chest (1979) (with Prince Jazzbo)
- Moving Away (1979) Live & Love
- Jah Woosh Meets Jah Stitch at Leggo Sounds (1995) Leggo

=== Compilations ===
- Original Ragga Muffin (1975–77) (1996) Blood and Fire
- The Killer (1999) Culture Press
- Love & Harmony Rhino (with Jackie Mittoo)
- Dread Inna Jamdown (2007) Jamaican Recordings
- Anthology 1969-1990 (2012), Attack
