= Dreadlocks Dread =

Dread Locks Dread

Studio album by Big Youth
- Released: 1975
- Recorded: 1975
- Genre: Reggae
- Length: 33:33
- Label: Klik
- Producer: Tony Robinson

Big Youth chronology
Reggae Phenomenon (1975)	Dread Locks Dread (1975)	Natty Cultural Dread (1976)

Professional ratings
Review scores
Source	Rating
AllMusic	4.5/5 stars
The Virgin Encyclopedia of Seventies Music	4/5 stars

Dread Locks Dread is an album by the Jamaican deejay Big Youth, released in 1975 on Klik Records.

The album collects Big Youth’s toasting dub versions of Yabby You’s “Conquering Lion”,Junior Byles’ “Curly Locks” and Burning Spear’s “Marcus Garvey.”

== Critical reception ==
Trouser Press wrote that "(t)he LP marks Big Youth’s development as a composer, and his increased reliance on Rasta subject matter", noting that "the record is widely considered his best."

== Track listing ==
All tracks by Big Youth & Tony Robinson

1. "Train to Rhodesia" – 3:33
2. "House of Dread Locks" – 3:17
3. "Lightning Flash (Weak Heart Drop)" – 3:21
4. "Natty Dread She Want" – 3:18
5. "Some Like It Dread" – 3:05
6. "Marcus Garvey Dread" – 3:03
7. "Big Youth Special" – 2:29
8. "Dread Organ" – 3:02
9. "Black Man Message" – 2:53
10. "Moving On" – 3:07
11. "You Don't Care" – 2:36

== Personnel ==
- Skin, Flesh & Bones – backing band
- Big Youth – vocals
- Casey Cashman – art direction
- Trevor Herman – liner notes
- Cooke Key – sleeve art
- Dennis Morris – photography
- Dave Turner – mastering

== Recording information ==
- Recording : Randy Chin's, Kingston, Jamaica & Harry J, Kingston, Jamaica
- Mixing : Joe Gibbs
- Engineer : Errol Thompson
- Arranger : Tony Robinson
