= A Luta Continua =

A Luta Continua may refer to:

- A luta continua, a slogan used by the FRELIMO movement during Mozambique's war for independence
- A Luta Continua (album), 1995 by Big Youth
- A Luta Continua (film), a documentary that depicts the FRELIMO struggle for the independence of Mozambique from Portugal

== See also ==
- Lotta Continua, a far-left militant organization in Italy
