= Blood and Fire (record label) =

British reggae record label

- Founded: 1993
- Founder: Steve Barrow, Bob Harding, Mick Hucknall, Elliot Rashman, Andy Dodd
- Distributor: VP Records
- Genre: Reggae
- Country of origin: United Kingdom
- Location: Manchester
- Official website: www.bloodandfire.co.uk

Blood and Fire was a British reggae record label active from 1993-2014, specialising in reissues of 1970s dub.

== History ==
Steve Barrow (Reggae historiographer, chronologist and archivist) and Bob Harding (former vocalist with post-punk band The Mothmen) worked with Simply Red's singer Mick Hucknall and management Elliot Rashman and Andy Dodd to form the record label in Manchester in 1993 with the objective of reissuing roots reggae, dub and DJ albums with the integrity of jazz reissues. In the process, Blood and Fire influenced the overall aesthetic of other labels issuing archival Jamaican recordings in the 1990s and beyond.

The company logo and album covers were designed by Intro.

Initial releases drew on mid-1970s Bunny Lee and King Tubby produced material. As Barrow said in 1999:

"The majority of the Blood & Fire catalogue went through King Tubby's [studio]. There are exceptions but, by and large, most of those records were mixed by King Tubby or one of his pupils, and they were voiced there. We think that King Tubby is one of the most important figures this century, so indirectly the catalogue celebrates King Tubby and his contribution. We think that King Tubby is probably more important than Bob Marley..."

The label subsequently reissued material produced by Yabby You and Glen Brown along with the Lee "Scratch" Perry produced Congos set Heart of the Congos and a three-CD Big Youth set, Natty Universal Dread. Heart of the Congos would sell 80,000 copies over a ten year period.

Despite the reissue objective, the label released two one-riddim albums with newly-recorded vocals. The first was Tree of Satta (2003) which used the original "Satta Massagana" riddim featuring a mixture of new and vintage voicings over the riddim along with the original version of the song by The Abyssinians. The second, Fisherman Style (2006), used The Congos' "Fisherman" riddim and featured new material from a variety of singers including Horace Andy, U Roy, Big Youth, Luciano, Tony Tuff and Dillinger.

The label also had a sound system which has featured original Jamaican artists such as Dilinger, Trinity, Ranking Joe, U Brown, Horace Andy, Dennis Alcapone, U Roy, Spikey Tee, Country Culture, Raggamonica along with Steve Barrow and Dom Sotgiu. In July 2006 the sound went to Japan with U Roy on a three date sell out tour.

In 2007, news leaked out via the company's popular message board that Blood and Fire had stopped trading as an active company. The loss of their American and French distributors due to bankruptcy as well as some unfortunate management decisions, combined with an industry-wide decline in sales, were to blame.

In 2014 it was announced that the label would be relaunched in conjunction with VP Records, with Barrow overseeing future projects. Only one release was produced in this incarnation, a twelve inch single of Gregory Isaac's "Mr Know It All" for Record Store Day 2014.

Blood and Fire was dissolved as a Limited Company on 5th February 2019.

== Reception and legacy ==
The Rough Guide to World Music described Blood & Fire as "A gem of a label..." which "releases well-conceived and superbly produced and packaged compilations of Jamaican music."

In his book Retromania, music journalist Simon Reynolds noted that prior to Blood & Fire "reggae reissues had generally been shoddy affairs with ugly packaging, no information and dismal sound... Blood & Fire set itself apart by its careful sound restoration and attractive vintage-aura artwork."

In Original Rockers, Richard North states: "Within three years the label had released sixteen faultless albums of Jamaican roots music with a rare assurance and authority. [...] To listen to the catalogue was a form of higher education".

In 2011 Bob Harding and Dom Sotgiu founded a new reggae label called King Spinna.

== Discography ==
=== 1994 ===
- BAFCD/LP001 – The Dreads at King Tubby's – If Deejay Was your Trade
- BAFCD/LP002 – King Tubby and Friends – Dub Gone Crazy
- BAFCD/LP003 – Keith Hudson – Pick a Dub
- BAFCD/LP004 – Burning Spear – Social Living
- BAFCD/LP005 – Yabby U – King Tubby's Prophesy of Dub

=== 1995 ===
- BAFCD/LP006, BAFLP007 – Horace Andy – In The Light / In The Light Dub
- BAFCD007 – Various Artists – Heavyweight Sound
- BAFCD/LP008 – Tapper Zukie – Tappa Zukie in Dub

=== 1996 ===
- BAFCD/LP009 – The Congos – Heart of the Congos (2-CD)
- BAFCD/LP010 – Jah Stitch – Original Raggamuffin 1975–1977
- BAFCD1001 – King Tubby & Scientist – Greenwich Farm Rub-A-Dub
- BAFCD/LP011 – King Tubby & Soul Syndicate – Freedom Sounds in Dub
- BAFCD/LP012 – Scientist – Dub in the Roots Tradition
- BAFCD/LP013 – King Tubby & Prince Jammy – Dub Gone 2 Crazy
- BAFCD/LP014 – Prince Alla – Only Love Can Conquer
- BAFCD/LP015 – Glen Brown & King Tubby – Termination Dub 1973–1979

=== 1997 ===
- BAFCD/LP016 – I-Roy – Don't Check Me With No Lightweight Stuff 1972–1975
- BAFCD017 – Various Artists – 2 Heavyweight: Another Blood and Fire Sampler
- BAFCD/LP018 – Morwell Unlimited Meet King Tubby's – Dub Me
- BAFCD/LP019 – Horace Andy – Good Vibes
- BFCDS903 – Various Artists – Dubwise and Otherwise: A Blood and Fire Audio Catalogue
- BAFCD/LP020 – U Brown – Train To Zion
- BAFCD/LP021 – Yabby You – Jesus Dread 1972–1977 (2-CD)
- BAFCD/LPO22 – Yabby You – Jesus Dread 1995–1997 (2-CDE)

=== 1998 ===
- BAFCD/LP022 – Impact Allstars – Forward The Bass: Dub From Randy's 1972–1975
- BAFCD/LP023 – Junior Byles and Friends – 129 Beat Street: Ja-Man Special 1975–1978
- BAFCD/LP024 – Johnny Clarke – Dreader Dread 1976–1978

=== 1999 ===
- BAFCD025 – Various Artists – Heavyweight 3: A Blood and Fire Sampler
- BAFCD/LP026 – King Tubby & Friends – Dub Like Dirt 1975–1977
- BAFCD/LP027 – Max Romeo – Open The Iron Gate 1973–1977
- BAFCD028 – The Chantells & Friends – Children of Jah 1977–1979
- BAFCD/LP029 – Inner Circle & The Fatman Riddim Section – Heavyweight Dub / Killer Dub
- BFCDS904 – The Dubmasters – X-Ray Music: A Blood and Fire Dub Directory

=== 2000 ===
- BAFCD/LP030 – Cornell Campbell – I Shall Not Remove 1975–1980
- BAFCD/LP031 – Trinity – Shanty Town Determination
- BAFCD/LP032 – Linval Thompson – Ride on Dreadlocks 1975–1977
- BAFCD/LP033 – Sylford Walker & Welton Irie – Lamb's Bread International

=== 2001 ===
- BAFCD/LP034 – Big Youth – Natty Universal Dread 1973–1979 (3-CD)
- BAFCD035 – Gregory Isaacs – Mr Isaacs
- BAFCD/LP036 – Darker Than Blue: Soul From Jamdown, 1973-1977
- BAFCD/LP037 – Niney the Observer – Microphone Attack 1974–1977

=== 2002 ===
- BAFCD/LP038 – Yabby You – Dub it to the Top 1976–1979
- BAFCD/LP039 – Dennis Brown – The Promised Land 1977–1979
- BAFCD040 – Prince Alla & Junior Ross – I Can Hear The Children Singing 1975–1978
- BFCDS905 – Various Artists – Dubwise And Otherwise 2: A Blood and Fire Audio Catalogue

=== 2003 ===
- BAFCD041 – Ja-Man Allstars – In The Dub Zone
- BAFCD/LP042 – Jackie Mittoo – Champion in the Arena 1976–1977
- BAFCD/LP043 – Ranking Joe – Zion High
- BAFCD/LP044 – Tommy McCook – Blazing Horns / Tenor in Roots

=== 2004 ===
- BAFCD/LP045 – The Abyssinians and Friends – The Tree of Satta Vol 01
- BAFCD/LP046 – Dennis Brown Presents Prince Jammy – Umoja / 20th Century DEBwise

=== 2005 ===
- BAFCD047 – Blood and Fire All Stars – Run It Red
- BAFCD/LP048 – Willi Williams – Messenger Man
- BAFCD/LP049 – Prince Far I – Silver & Gold 1973–1979

=== 2006 ===
- BAFCD/LP050 – The Congos and Friends – Fisherman Style
- BAFCD/LP051 – Yabby You – Deliver Me From My Enemies

=== 2007 ===
- BFCDS906 – Blood and Fire Allstars – Singerman!

=== 2014 ===
- VPBAF6524 – Gregory Isaacs – "Mr. Know It All/War of the Stars" (12")

== See also ==
- Lists of record labels
