= Tiger (musician) =

Jamaican dancehall musician

- Also known as: Tiga
- Born: Norman Washington Jackson; 6 June 1960 (age 66); Kingston, Jamaica
- Genres: Reggae, dancehall
- Occupations: Musician, singer
- Instrument: Vocals
- Years active: 1978–1993, 2003–present
- Labels: RAS, Jammy's, VP, Rohit, Penthouse, Chaos/Columbia/SME Records

Norman Washington Jackson (born 6 June 1960), better known as Tiger, is a Jamaican dancehall musician active since the late 1970s. He is known for his growling style of deejaying, often imitated by other dancehall deejays since his initial rise to fame.

== Biography ==
Jackson was born in Kingston, Jamaica. He first recorded as a singer under the name Ranking Tiger, his first single being "Why Can't You Leave Dreadlocks Alone?" in 1978. In the early 1980s he began working as a DJ with the Black Star Sound System, often performing alongside fellow deejay Bruk Back and singer Anthony Malvo.

In 1985 and 1986, he had several local hits including "No Wanga Gut" and "No Puppy Love". He was signed by Mango Records who released his first album, Me Name Tiger, in 1986. In the second half of the 1980s he became a major star of Jamaican music, known for his style that has been described as "multi-voiced and totally deranged", and recorded for producers including Harry J, King Jammy, Gussie Clarke, Sly & Robbie, Philip "Fatis" Burrell and Donovan Germain. He also began producing his own recordings and started his own Tiger label. His single "Cool Me Down" was included on the soundtrack of the film Cool Runnings. In 1989, he became one of the first ragga artists to cross over into the US hip hop scene when he duetted with the Fat Boys on "T'ings Nah Go So". Success continued in the 1990s and he was signed by Columbia Records' short-lived Chaos imprint. His only album for the label was Claws of the Cat in 1993.

In January 1994, Jackson was seriously injured in a motorcycle accident. He suffered serious head injuries and his recovery was slow, and the injury affected his voice to the point where he was no longer able to record or perform to his previous capacity. However, in 2003, he returned to live performance as part of the Dons of Dancehall UK tour. He also appeared at Reggae Sumfest alongside deejay Kiprich in 2007, as well as the 2010 "Reewind and Come Again" in New York, which included a host of dancehall performers from the 1980s and early 1990s.

== Discography ==
- Me Name Tiger (1986), RAS
- Kangal Presents Tiger Meets Yellowman (1986), Kangal - split LP with Yellowman
- Tiger Meets General Trees Live In Concert (1987), CSA - with General Trees
- Bam Bam (1988), RAS
- Shockin' Colour (1989), Jammy's
- Ram Dancehall (1989), VP
- Love Affair (1990), Rohit
- Touch Is a Move (1990), VP
- Reggae Dancehall Sensation (1990), Rohit
- Tiger a Tiger (1991), New Name
- Ready Fi Dem (1991), VP
- Deadly (1992), Penthouse
- Put It On (1992), Rohit
- Claws of the Cat (1993), Chaos/Columbia/SME
- Come Back to Me, Techniques

Compilations

- New Brand Style (1995), RAS
- RAS Portraits (1997), RAS
- Most Wanted (2011), VP
