= A Luta Continua (album) =

Studio album by Big Youth
- Released: 1985
- Recorded: 1984
- Studio: Music Mountain, Stony Hill, Jamaica
- Genre: Reggae
- Length: 43:07
- Label: Heartbeat
- Producer: Herbie Miller

Big Youth chronology
Live at Reggae Sunsplash (1984)	A Luta Continua (1985)	Manifestation (1988)

Professional ratings
Review scores
Source	Rating
AllMusic	3/5 stars
Christgau's Record Guide	B
The Encyclopedia of Popular Music	3/5 stars

A Luta Continua (Portuguese for The Struggle Continues) is a studio album by the Jamaican musician Big Youth, released in 1985. The title track is about the fight to end apartheid. Jonathan Demme was inspired to use the phrase in the credits of his movies Something Wild and Married to the Mob. In addition, the track "Feel It" is featured in Something Wild.

== Track listing ==
All tracks composed by Herbie Miller and Manley Buchanan

1. "Survival Plan"
2. "Sing Another Song"
3. "Feel It"
4. "Weatherman"
5. "Rock Johnny Roll"
6. "KKK"
7. "Bush Mama"
8. "Action"
9. "A Luta Continua"
10. "Song of Praise"

== Personnel ==
- Big Youth – Vocals
- Robbie Shakespeare – Bass
- Robby Lynn – Keyboards
- Skully – Drums, Repeater
- Leroy Sibbles – Background Vocals
- Aston Barrett – Bass
- Cedric Brooks – Tenor Saxophone
- Buchanan – Arranger
- Anthony "Bunny" Graham – Tom Tom
- Sly Dunbar – Drums
- Dean Fraser – Alto & Tenor Saxophone
- Chris "Sky Juice" Blake – Percussion
- Willie Lindo – Guitar
- The Tamlins – Background Vocals
- Byard Lancaster – Baritone Saxophone

Production

- Recording : Harry J Studio, Kingston, Jamaica & Joe Gibbs Studio, Kingston, Jamaica
- Engineer : Errol Thompson
