= Keith Hudson =

- Born: 18 March 1946
- Origin: Kingston, Jamaica
- Died: 14 November 1984 (aged 38) New York, United States
- Genres: Reggae, dub reggae
- Occupation(s): Singer-songwriter, record producer
- Instruments: Vocals, Trombone
- Years active: 1960–1984
- Labels: Joint International; Imbidimts; Atra; Virgin
- Website: https://keithhudsonmusic.com

Keith Hudson (18 March 1946 – 14 November 1984), was a Jamaican reggae artist and record producer. He is known for his influence on the dub movement.

== Biography ==
Raised in a musical family, Hudson attended Boys Town School in Kingston, where he organized school concerts with schoolmates including Bob Marley, Delroy Wilson, and Ken Boothe. He was an ardent follower of Coxsone Dodd's Downbeat sound system and was soon hanging out with musicians such as Don Drummond, carrying his trombone into sessions at Dodd's Brentford Road studio when he was around fourteen. His first release circa 1969 was "Shades of Hudson" by DJ Dennis Alcapone on his own Inbidimts label, using a rocksteady track that had been recorded a few years before. After leaving school he served an apprenticeship in dentistry, and used these skills to raise money for recording sessions. In the same year he obtained some Termites and Carl Bryan rocksteady rhythms from Olympic Records, and recorded new vocals over them, such as "Old Broom" and "You Must be Popular". These early 45s on his own Imbidmts and Rebind labels enjoyed sufficient success to enable him to purchase some studio time of his own. His first recording session produced Ken Boothe's Jamaican hit "Old Fashioned Way", later versioned by Dennis Alcapone as "Spanish Omega" and U Roy as "Dynamic Fashion Way". In the following months he worked with vocalists Delroy Wilson ("Run, Run"), Alton Ellis, Bunny Gale and John Holt ("Never Will I Hurt My Baby"). He was one of the first to record DJ U-Roy in 1969, although U-Roy's first recording had in fact been made with Peter Tosh for Lee Perry – "Earth's Rightful Ruler". Other deejay productions included numerous tunes with Dennis Alcapone (e.g. "Shades of Hudson"), and Big Youth's "S.90 Skank" released in 1972 became the deejay's biggest hit, with added motorcycle noises recorded in the studio beginning a trend followed by other producers such as Dodd and Perry. In the first half of the 1970s he regularly used the Soul Syndicate band, featuring George "Fully" Fullwood and Carlton "Santa" Davis.

In 1970 he began to record his own vocal tracks. Whilst always somewhat limited vocally, he recorded countless tracks as a singer, and concentrated on his singing career from 1972. He started further record labels such as the Mafia label. His early Jamaican albums Furnace and Class and Subject featured his own distinctive rasping vocals, along with dubs and deejay versions. In 1974, Hudson released his classic Pick a Dub, widely considered to have been the first deliberately thematic dub album, with tracks specifically mixed in the dub style for the purpose of appearing together on an album. It featured dubwise mixes of his "We Will Work It Out", the basic track for "S-90 Skank", with a fresh melodica part by Augustus Pablo, Skiddy and Detroit's "The Exile Song", and remakes of The Abyssinians "Satta Massagana" and "Declaration of Rights". It was also the first dub album to gain a release in the United Kingdom.

By now, he had effectively stopped recording other singers and DJs to concentrate on his own singing. He had completed a large number of backing tracks and, after the limited success of his third LP Entering the Dragon he emigrated to the United Kingdom, where he signed up with Brent Clarke's Atra label and worked at Chalk Farm Studios in London with a number of British-based reggae musicians, overdubbing his Jamaican rhythms. The first album to emanate from these sessions was Flesh of My Skin, Blood of my Blood (1974), his first UK only release and an album that has been described by Colin Larkin as "a masterpiece", and one of the first reggae albums proper, rather than merely a collection of singles and fillers. It has also been described as "reggae's first true concept album", with the lyrics relating to black history and "conscious" themes. The album was not released in Jamaica, although it acquired a formidable reputation there amongst more progressive musicians. His next UK-based album Torch of Freedom featured vocal cuts with their instrumental versions following immediately after, a format that was to come into fashion three years later during the "Showcase" craze.

In 1976 he moved to New York City and signed a four-year contract with Virgin Records, the first release being the soul-influenced album, Too Expensive, which was poorly received by critics and didn't sell well. Hudson returned to reggae with the "(Jonah) Come Out Now" single, released under the pseudonym Lloyd Linberg, and Virgin terminated his contract. Hudson then started a new label of his own, Joint. He resumed working with the Soul Syndicate, who had backed him on many of his best recordings in Jamaica. His album Rasta Communication (1978), which had been preceded by its issue on dub as Brand, was well received by a wider audience and is considered a roots reggae classic. It was followed by Nuh Skin Up Dub and its vocal counterpart From One Extreme to Another in 1979. Hudson also released a deejay album by Militant Barry based on the Brand rhythms, Green Valley. By the early 1980s, he was considerably out of step with modern trends in "dancehall" music. He reverted to his classic rhythms for his next to last album Playing It Cool (1981), recording new vocals on heavily overdubbed mixes of the earlier tunes. He released one final album in 1982, Steaming Jungle, which attracted little attention. It was reported in 1984 that he was once more working with Aston and Carlton Barrett, who had played on Pick a Dub and Torch of Freedom. Hudson was diagnosed with lung cancer in August 1984, and appeared to be responding well to treatment, but on the morning of 14 November he complained of stomach pains, collapsed and died.

== Albums discography ==
=== Albums ===
- Class & Subject – 1972 – Mafia
- Furnace – 1972 – Imbidimts
- Pick a Dub – 1974 – Mamba / Atra / Blood & Fire (CD)
- Entering The Dragon – 1974 – Magnet (reissued by Trojan in 2006 and by Sunspot in 2011)
- Flesh of My Skin, Blood of My Blood – 1974 – Mamba /Atra 1988 – (Reissued by Basic Replay 2004)
- Torch of Freedom – 1975 – Mamba / Atra
- Too Expensive – 1976 – Virgin Records
- Brand – 1977 – Joint International (US) / Brand (UK) / Pressure Sounds (CD)
- Rasta Communication – 1978 – Joint International (US), Greensleeves Records (UK)
- From One Extreme To Another – 1979 – Joint International (US)
- Playing It Cool, Playing It Right – 1981 – Joint International (US) (Reissued by Basic Replay 2003)
- Nuh Skin Up Dub – 1982 – Joint International (US)
- Steaming Jungle – 1982 – Disc Disk

=== Compilations ===
- Various Artists – The Big J of Reggae (Joint International, 1978)
- Keith Hudson & Various Artists – Studio Kinda Cloudy (Trojan 1988)
- Keith Hudson – Sky High & The Mau Mau Presents Keith Hudson's Greatest Hits Part 1 (Sky High)
- Keith Hudson & Various Artists – Shades of Hudson (VP, 1996)
- Keith Hudson & Friends – The Hudson Affair (Trojan 2004)
- Various Artists – The Rough Guide to Dub (World Music Network, 2005)

== Family ==
His youngest son Keith Hudson Jr better known as Tryfle is following his own step in music Industry. Currently living in New York City Keith "Tryfle" Hudson is currently signed to The Nu Breed Music Group owned and operated by Anthony "Fate" Lynch.

== Influence ==
- Ian Curtis of the post punk band Joy Division was a fan of Keith Hudson. New Order covered the Keith Hudson song "Turn the Heater On" in their 1982 Peel Session.
