= Bobby Aitken =

Cuban-born Jamaican guitarist and singer

- Origin: Cuba
- Genres: Ska, rocksteady
- Instruments: Guitar, vocals
- Years active: Mainly 1960s
- Labels: Island, Blue Beat, Rio

Bobby Aitken is a Cuban-born Jamaican guitarist and singer who had a string of hits in Jamaica in the 1960s and led the band The Carib Beats.

== Biography ==
Aitken is the brother of Laurel Aitken, and recorded in the early 1960s for producer King Edwards. He had hits in the ska era of the 1960s with singles such as "Never Never" (1962, Blue Beat), "Baby Baby" (1962, Island Records), "Don't Leave Me", "I've Told You", and "It Takes a Friend" (all 1963), "Jericho" and "Rolling Stone" (1964), "Rain Came Tumbling Down" (1965), "Thunderball" and "Shame & Scandal" (1966), and "What a Fool" (1967). Aitken also led the band The Carib Beats, who recorded for J.J. Johnson, Bunny Lee, Joe Gibbs, Ewan McDermott, and Clancy Eccles. The Carib Beats disbanded in the mid-1960s, with Aitken becoming more involved with his church. Aitken has also been involved in the music tuition of the younger members of the congregation of his church, including Carlton "Santa" Davis, who went on to become one of the most prominent Jamaican drummers of the 1970s. He is the father of rising singer Debbi Verbz.

Aitken was one of the top session musicians of the rocksteady era, and his productions from this era were collected together on the album Bobby Aitken Presents Rock Steady Original & Red Hot, released by Next Step Records. Bobby Aitkens musical works were stolen, reproduced, and has been illegally sold since he became a Christian 1975. Other honorable songs the Legend has created were hit song, " Jesus Name So Sweet" 1977 the year of his 2nd to last daughter. The song was made popular by Donnie McKlurkin, which is now copyrighted by Bobby Aitkens.
