= Hit the Road Jack (album) =

Hit The Road Jack

Compilation album by Big Youth
- Released: 1976
- Genre: Reggae
- Length: 32:24
- Label: Trojan
- Producer: Big Youth

Big Youth chronology
Natty Cultural Dread (1976)	Hit The Road Jack (1976)	Isaiah First Prophet of Old (1978)

Hit the Road Jack is a 1976 album by the reggae artist Manley Buchanan from Kingston, Jamaica, better known as Big Youth. In February 2011, as part of its Reggae Britannia TV series, the BBC broadcast an interview with Buchanan in which he discussed his version of Hit the Road Jack.

== Track listing ==
All tracks composed by Manley Buchanan; except where indicated

1. "What's Going On" (Marvin Gaye)
2. "Hit the Road Jack" (Percy Mayfield)
3. "Wake Up Everybody" (Victor Carstarphen, Gene McFadden, John Whitehead)
4. "Get Up, Stand Up" (Bob Marley, Peter Tosh)
5. "Jah Man of Syreen"
6. "Ten Against One"
7. "Hotter Fire"
8. "The Way of the Light"
9. "Dread High Ranking"
10. "Dread Is the Best"

== Personnel ==
- Vocals : Big Youth

== Recording Information ==
- Recording : Randy's, Kingston, Jamaica
- Engineers : Karl Pitterson & Errol Thompson
