= Maxfield Park Children's Home =

Location
- 89 Maxfield Ave, Kingston, Jamaica; Kingston, Jamaica

Information
- Type: Orphanage
- Established: September 1918
- Age range: 0-18
- Area: 61/2 acres

The Maxfield Park Children's Home is both the largest and oldest home for displaced children in Jamaica. Founded in Kingston in September 1918, the facility houses children from all parishes ranging in age from birth to 18 years. Children are admitted to the home after having been determined to be in need of care and protection as provided by the Child Care and Protection Act, which was nationalized in 2004. Children at the facility are referred from the Jamaican Child Development Agency (Children's Office), the police and the courts (Children's or Family). The facility is run by the Child Protection and Family Services Agency of Jamaica. As of 17 January 2023, approximately 86 youths were housed in the facility.

== Investments and improvements ==
In September 2018, the Maxfield Park Children Home's administrators embarked on a new initiative to construct a mental health center at home. As part of a US$1 million construction project, the complex will provide housing accommodation for females aged 18–21, who have exited State care and have no other living options, over a period of two years. These facilities form part of a multi-agency project funded by the United States Agency for International Development (USAID) over a period of six years at a cost of US$5.2 million.

State minister Robert Morgan has stated that thirty million dollars ($30,000,000) from the Child Protection and Family Services Agency will go towards constructing the Child Therapeutic Centre at Maxfield Park Children's Home. The additional funding for the $117 million project will come from the Jamaica Social Investment Fund Basic Needs Trust Fund (JSIF BNTF), a project funded by the Caribbean Development Bank (CDB).

== Notable residents ==
- Reggae and dancehall artist Yellowman was a resident of the home for a period of time.
- Reggae singer, songwriter and record producer Leroy Smart entered Maxfield Park at the age of two where he resided for ten years.
