= Tapper Zukie =

- Born: David Sinclair; 1955 (age 70–71)
- Origin: Kingston, Jamaica
- Genres: Reggae, dancehall
- Labels: Stars, Tappa, Klik, Front Line/Virgin

Tapper Zukie (or Tappa Zukie) (born David Sinclair, 1955, Kingston, Jamaica) is a reggae deejay and producer.

== Biography ==
Tapper was the nickname given to him by his grandmother in his youth, while Zukie was a name that came from his friends' association as a young boy - their gang was called 'The Zukies'.

In 1973 his mother, concerned with Zukie's tendency to get into trouble, sent him to England to stay with some relatives. Producer Bunny Lee arranged with the UK-based entrepreneur Larry Lawrence for him to undertake some recording sessions and concerts, opening for U-Roy the day after his arrival in London. Zukie's first release was the single "Jump & Twist", produced by Lawrence. Around this time he also recorded material for Clem Bushay, which would later form part of the Man Ah Warrior album, issued in 1973.

Zukie returned to Jamaica, cutting "Judge I Oh Lord" for Lloydie Slim and "Natty Dread Don't Cry" for Lee. After an argument with Lee that resulted in the police being called, the two made peace with Lee giving Zukie some riddims to record over, and taking these and others from Joseph Hoo Kim, he toasted over them at King Tubby's studio, these forming the album MPLA (released in 1976).

The Man Ah Warrior album had gained Zukie a cult following in the UK, and he returned there in 1975, releasing the track "MPLA" as a single, which was sufficiently successful for Klik to issue the album of the same name in the UK. One notable fan of MPLA was Patti Smith, who gave Zukie a support slot on her UK tour, reissued Man a Warrior on her Mer label, and contributed sleeve-notes to his 1977 album Man From Bosrah. Reviewing the 1977 reissue of Man a Warrior, Village Voice critic Robert Christgau said: "Dub has certain affinities with heavy metal, which may be why the only album of the stuff I've ever played much is Big Youth's first, Screaming Target, now five years old and never released in the States. Ace discophile Lenny Kaye has compiled this set from the same period, which means that the mix is less volcanic than in recent dub, the vocals more buoyant. Zukie's is fresh enough to really enjoy putting a rap down, too, so he doesn't sound doombound, verbally or musically. Sample segue: from 'Simpleton Badness' to 'Archie the Rednose Reindeer.'"

This period of success allowed Zukie to set up his own 'Stars' record label, and he began to produce other artists, including Junior Ross & The Spear, Prince Alla, Errol Dunkley, Ronnie Davis, and Horace Andy. Two dub albums emerged in 1977: Escape From Hell and Tapper Zukie In Dub.

A deal with Virgin Records subsidiary Frontline saw the release of two further albums in 1978 - Peace In The Ghetto and Tapper Roots, while he also continued to release records on his Stars label in Jamaica.

After 1976, he concentrated on producing music in Jamaica, working with such reggae musicians as The Mighty Diamonds, Max Romeo, Ken Boothe, Sugar Minott and U-Roy.

In 1978 he scored a big hit with "Oh Lord", which spent six weeks on top of the Jamaican charts. Also popular that summer was "She Want a Phensic".

In the mid-1980s, Zukie was more prolific as a producer, working with artists such as The Mighty Diamonds, Sugar Minott, and Max Romeo. In 1986 he released a new album of his own, Raggamuffin. He continued to concentrate on production, although another album was released in 1996, Deep Roots.

After suffering a "diabetic episode" in October 2015, Zukie was out of the public eye until he performed at a concert in December 2018. He stated in January 2019 that he was recording a new album and planned to perform in Europe in the summer.

== Discography ==
=== Albums ===
- Man a Warrior (1973), Klik
- M.P.L.A. (1976), Klik - reissued (1978), Virgin
- Escape From Hell (1977), Stars
- Tapper Zukie in Dub (1977), Stars
- The Man From Bosrah (1978), Stars
- Peace in the Ghetto (1978), Virgin
- Tapper Zukie International (1978), Stars
- Blackman (1978), Stars
- Tapper Roots (1978), Stars/Front Line
- Living In The Ghetto (1979), Stars
- Raggy Joey Boy (1982), Stars
- Earth Running (1983), Mobiliser
- People Are You Ready? (1983), Stars
- Ragamuffin (1986), World Enterprise
- Deep Roots (1996), RAS

=== Compilations ===
- Living in the Ghetto, Stars
- Cork & Tar (2004), Tappa
- Dub 'Em Zukie (2004), Jamaican Recordings
- Musical Intimidator: The Anthology (2004), Trojan
- The Best of the Frontline Years (2004), Virgin
- From the Archives, RAS
