= The Aggrovators =

Back up band in the 1970s and 1980s

- Origin: Jamaica
- Genres: Dub, reggae
- Past members: Lennox Brown; Tony Chin; Ansel Collins; Carlton "Santa" Davis; Bobby Ellis; Vin Gordon; Bernard "Touter" Harvey; Tommy McCook; Robbie Shakespeare; Earl "Chinna" Smith; George "Fully" Fullwood; Winston "Bo Beep" Bowen; Sly Dunbar; Carlton Barrett; Aston "Family Man" Barrett; Lloyd Parks; Ossie Hibbert; Keith Sterling; Errol "Tarzan" Nelson; Winston Wright; Barnabus; Noel "Scully" Simms

The Aggrovators were a Jamaican dub/reggae backing band in the 1970s and 1980s, and one of the main session bands of producer Bunny Lee. The line-up varied, with Lee using the name for whichever set of musicians he was using at any time. The band's name derived from the record shop that Lee had run in the late 1960s, Agro Sounds. Alumni of the band included many musicians who later went on to make names for themselves in reggae music. Musicians such as Jackie Mittoo, Sly and Robbie, Tommy McCook, and Aston Barrett were all involved with the band at one point or another. Other regular members included Carlton "Santa" Davis, Earl "Chinna" Smith, George "Fully" Fullwood, Ansel Collins, Bernard "Touter" Harvey, Tony Chin, Bobby Ellis, and Vin Gordon. The band recorded Lee's most popular output from the 1970s, with the instrumental B-sides of Lee's single releases on the Jackpot and Justice labels generally credited to The Aggrovators and mixed by King Tubby.

During the mid-1970s, the Aggrovators helped popularise the "flying cymbals" sound with the encouragement of producer Bunny Lee. Characterised by a brisk, clipped hi-hat pattern, the style became prominent in roots reggae for several years after 1974.

== Discography ==
=== Albums ===
- 1975 - Shalom Dub (King Tubby & The Aggrovators)
- 1975 - Brass Rockers (Tommy McCook & The Aggravators)
- 1975 - Cookin (Tommy McCook & The Aggrovators)
- 1975 - King Tubby Meets The Aggrovators at Dub Station (Tommy McCook & The Aggrovators)
- 1975 - Show Case (Tommy McCook & The Aggrovators)
- 1976 - Rasta Dub 76
- 1976 - Reggae Stones Dub
- 1977 - Kaya Dub
- 1977 - Aggrovators Meets The Revolutioners at Channel One Studios
- 1977 - Disco Rockers (Tommy McCook & The Aggrovators) (a.k.a. Hot Lava)
- 1978 - Guerilla Dub (The Aggrovators & The Revolutionaries)
- 1978 - Jammies in Lion Dub Style
- 1979 - Rockers Almighty Dub (The Aggrovators & The Revolutionaries)
- 197X - Presents Super Dub Disco Style (Bunny Lee & The Aggrovators)
- 1982 - Dubbing in the Back Yard (King Tubby & The Aggrovators)
- 1983 - Scientist Presents Neville Brown with the Aggrovators at Channel One
- 1990 - King Tubby's "Controls"
- 2007 - @ King Tubby's Studio
- 2017 - Aggrovating The Rhythm at Channel One - Rare Dubs 1976-1979

=== Compilations ===
- 1975-77 - Bionic Dub (The Aggrovators & King Tubby & Bunny Lee)
- 197X - Bunny Lee Meets King Tubby & Aggrovators
- 1973-77 - Creation Dub (The Aggrovators & King Tubby)
- 1974-76 - Dub Jackpot (The Aggrovators & King Tubby)
- 1975-76 - Dub Justice
- 1975-79 - Dub Gone Crazy (The Aggrovators & King Tubby)
- 1973-78 - Dubbing It Studio 1 Style
- 1975-77 - Foundation of Dub (King Tubby & The Aggrovators)
- 197X - Instrumental Reggae (The Aggrovators featuring Bobby Ellis & Tommy McCook)
- 1975-76 - Johnny in the Echo Chamber
- 1973-77 - Straight To I Roy Head (Bunny Lee & King Tubby & The Aggrovators)
- 2005 - The Rough Guide to Dub (Various artists, World Music Network)
