= Tippatone =

Jamaican sound system, 1960s

Tippatone (also known as (Lord) Tippatone Hifi) was an early Jamaican sound system. Tippatone rose to prominence in the late 1960s, as the popularity of the second generation of sound systems (specifically Coxsone Dodd's Downbeat Sound System and Duke Reid's The Trojans) decreased, and they were very popular in the early to mid-1970s. Their selector was Jah Wise, who had started as a "boxboy," carrying equipment for the act, and quickly became their selector.

Tippatone, like all sound systems, engaged in sound clashes; according to Jah Wise, those with King Twilight from Montego Bay were the most difficult. Tippatone is one of the few sound system who has dubplates from Bob Marley.
