= Gussie Clarke =

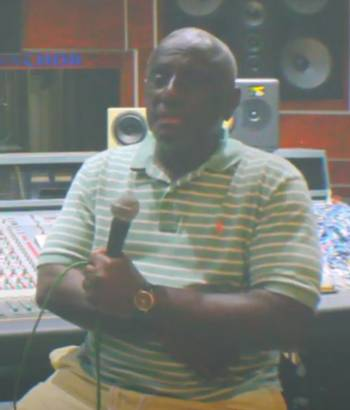
- Clarke in 2020

Background information
- Born: Augustus Clarke; 1954 (age 71–72)
- Origin: Kingston, Jamaica
- Genre: Reggae
- Occupation: Producer

Augustus Clarke (born 1954), better known as Gussie Clarke, is a roots reggae and dub producer who worked with some of the top Jamaican reggae artists in the 1970s and later set up his own Music Works studio.

== Career ==
Clarke started working in the music industry by cutting dub plates. He made his debut as a producer in 1972, with U-Roy's "The Higher The Mountain". He established himself as the top producer of deejays in the early 1970s with albums such as Big Youth's Screaming Target, and I-Roy's Presenting I Roy, both regarded as among the best deejay albums ever produced. Through the 1970s and early 1980s he worked with artists such as Dennis Brown, Gregory Isaacs, Augustus Pablo, Leroy Smart, and The Mighty Diamonds, including on the latter's influential "Pass the Kouchie" in 1981. Much of Clarke's output was released on his own Gussy and Puppy labels.

In the late 1980s, Clarke adapted to the new dancehall style of reggae, but stood out from other producers by attempting to produce glossier recordings with greater potential to cross over internationally.

In 1987, while he was still recording at Music Mountain and Dynamic Sounds studio, the first record to bear hints of this newly embraced digital sound came from the release of The Mighty Diamonds' The Real Enemy. "Gang War", the first single off the album, released on his Music Works label, showcased this new digi-roots style, incorporating keyboard and computer programming driven riddims, compared to the known traditional roots reggae sound with players of live instruments recording in the studio. This release stood out as the first transitional record for Clarke and his production blending old-school roots reggae with digital riddims.

In 1988 he launched his Music Works studio, equipped and ready to fully adopt the digital reggae era, successfully as a producer returned with hit records and singles for many Jamaican and UK artists. By mid-year, the first albums to showcase this style were released — The Mighty Diamonds' Get Ready and Gregory Isaacs' Red Rose For Gregory. The latter of the two included the successful "Rumours", the biggest hit on the island during the summer of 1988. J.C. Lodge's "Telephone Love", using the same "Rumours" riddim, was the biggest reggae hit of the same year in the United States. This hit single led to Clarke producing an album for Lodge in 1990 titled Selfish Lover, which saw her team up with Shabba Ranks on the duet "Hardcore Loving", and later again with Shabba Ranks on "Telephone Love Deh Pond Mi Mind" on his album Rappin' With The Ladies.

In 1989 Clarke reunited two of the most influential reggae artists, Dennis Brown and Gregory Isaacs, to record an album titled No Contest, which included "Big All Around", and followed it with similar "pairings" involving Home T, Cocoa Tea and Shabba Ranks. Clarke produced the digi-roots album Legit for Freddie McGregor, Dennis Brown and Cocoa Tea, which was released several years later. He also produced UK artist Deborahe Glasgow's self-titled album, which included "Champion Lover", which later formed the basis for Shabba Ranks' "Mr. Loverman". UK artist Maxi Priest's "Just A Little Bit Longer" became an international hit, as was Shabba Ranks & Krystal's "Twice My Age".

Many of Clarke's releases were issued on his own record labels Anchor and Music Works, as well on the Greensleeves, VP, Pow Wow and Shanachie labels.

In the mid-1990s, he predominantly released albums on the Gone Clear Distribution label for newcomer artists such as Daddy Rings, Sasha, Dean Fraser, and with The Mighty Diamonds (Stand Up). Some of Clarke's mid- to late 1990s releases were still licensed to record labels such as Ambassador Music, Greensleeves and VP Records. Soon after his final produced album for Dennis Brown, titled Stone Cold World in 1999 for VP Records, Clarke's productions quietened, with the occasional one-off single or re-issue compilation formats of previously released material re-sequenced and repackaged.

Into the late 1990s Clarke was working with artists such as Tiger, Lady G, Papa San, Cocoa Tea, Freddie McGregor, Maxi Priest, Aswad and Courtney Pine.

In 2006, Clarke produced the one-riddim compilation album Consuming Fire for VP Records' Riddim Driven series. The same year saw him as co-producer for Rihanna's "Crazy Little Thing Called Love" from her Girl Like Me album.

In October 2014 the Institute of Jamaica awarded Clarke a bronze Musgrave Medal for his contribution to music.

In August 2019 it was announced that Clarke would receive the Order of Distinction in the rank of commander (CD) from the Jamaican government in October that year.

== Original albums produced by Clarke ==
- Aswad – Too Wicked (1990)
- Big Youth – Screaming Target (1972)
- Cocoa Tea – Authorized (1991)
- Cocoa Tea – Can't Live So (1994)
- Cocoa Tea – Maximum Replay (1996)
- Courtney Pine – Closer To Home (1990) NOTE: Remixed album re-released (1992)
- Daddy Rings – Stand Out (1996–97)
- Dean Fraser – Dub 'N' Sax (1998)
- Delroy Wilson – Worth Your Weight In Gold (1984)
- Deborahe Glasgow – Deborahe Glasgow (1989)
- Dennis Brown – Unchallenged (1990)
- Dennis Brown – Maximum Replay (1996) NOTE: Includes the never-before-releases "Temptress" and "Just A Little Bit Longer" as performed by Maxi Priest – Refer to Maxi Priest entry below in next Content
- Dennis Brown – Stone Cold World (1999)
- Home T, Cocoa Tea, and Shabba Ranks – Holding On (1989)
- Gregory Isaacs – Absent (1993) – also known as: Unattended when released on Pow Wow Records
- Gregory Isaacs – I.O.U. (1989)
- Gregory Isaacs – Maximum Replay (1996)
- Gregory Isaacs – Private Beach Party (1985)
- Gregory Isaacs – Red Rose For Gregory (1988)
- Gregory Isaacs & Dennis Brown – Two Bad Superstars (1978)
- Gregory Isaacs & Dennis Brown – Judge Not (1984)
- Gregory Isaacs & Dennis Brown – No Contest (1989)
- Hortense Ellis – Reflections (1979)
- I Roy – Presenting I Roy (1973)
- J.C. Lodge – I Believe in You (1987)
- J.C. Lodge – Maximum Replay (1998)
- J.C. Lodge – Selfish Lover (1990)
- Freddie McGregor – Hard To Get (1992)
- Freddie McGregor – Carry Go Bring Come (1994)
- Freddie McGregor – Maximum Replay (1996)
- Freddie McGregor – Rumours (1997)
- Freddie McGregor, Dennis Brown and Cocoa Tea – Legit (1993)
- Lady G – Nuff Respect (1998)
- Leroy Smart Featuring The Mighty Diamonds – Disco Showcase (1979)
- Mikey Roots – Praise & Honour (1995–96)
- Ninja Man – Settle All Scores (1998)
- Papa San – The Sistem (1990) note: six tracks produced by Gussie Clarke. two other tracks remixed by The Music Works Crew
- Pinchers – Season To Season (1997)
- Sasha – Come Again (1996)
- Shabba Ranks – Hard Core (1998) note: released on the Gone Clear label (previously released Gussie Clarke produced material)
- Shabba Ranks – Mr. Maximum (1991–92)
- Shabba Ranks – Rappin' With The Ladies (1990)
- Shaka Shamba – Big Surprise (1996)
- The Mighty Diamonds – Backstage (1983)
- The Mighty Diamonds – Changes (1981)
- The Mighty Diamonds – Dubwise (1981)
- The Mighty Diamonds – Indestructible (1981)
- The Mighty Diamonds – The Roots Is Here (1982)
- The Mighty Diamonds – The Real Enemy (1987)
- The Mighty Diamonds – Get Ready (1988)
- The Mighty Diamonds – Maximum Replay (1996)
- The Mighty Diamonds – Stand Up (1998)
- The Revolutionaries – Dread At The Controls Dub (1978)
- Tetrack – Trouble (1983)
- Trinity (musician)Trinity – Showcase (1978)
- Various Artists – Chatty Chatty Mouth Versions (1993)
- Various Artists – Consuming Fire – Riddim Driven (2006)
- Various Artists – Hardcore Ragga (1990)
- Various Artists – Music Works Showcase '88 (1988) – Rumours – riddim
- Various Artists – Music Works Showcase '89 (1989) – Mund Yu Dis – riddim
- Various Artists – Music Works Showcase '90 (1990)
- Various Artists – Music Works Showcase '91 (1991) – Twice My Age riddim
- Various Artists – Music Works Showcase '97 (1997)
- Various Artists – Music Works Selections '97 (1997)
- Various Artists – Ram Dancehall (1989)
- Various Artists – Reggae Anthology Music Works Classics (2002)

== Original 7", 12" or cd format song listings and/or singles produced by Clarke ==
- Admiral Tibet – The Lunatic 7" vinyl, cd
- Admiral Tibet (a-side) Admiral Tibet & Shabba Ranks – Tell Me Which One // No Competition (1990) 12" vinyl, cd
- Aswad – Best Of My Love (1990) 12" vinyl, cd
- Aswad – Old Fire Stick (1990) 7" vinyl, cd
- Aswad – Smile (1990) 12" vinyl, cd
- Aswad & Shabba Ranks – Fire (1990) 12" vinyl, cd single, cd
- Beres Hammond – Call Me (1988) 7" & 12" vinyl, cd
- Brian & Tony Gold – Maniac (1989) 7" & 12" vinyl, cd
- Carl Meeks – You Are So Fine (1990) 7" & 12" vinyl
- Carl Meeks (a-side) Admiral Tibet (aa-side) – Rude Girl Sandra // Give Us The Opportunity (1990) 12" vinyl
- Cocoa Tea – Bunn It Down (1993) 12" vinyl, cd
- Cocoa Tea – One Away Woman (1991) 7" & 12" vinyl, cd
- Cocoa Tea – She Is So Faithful (1994) 7" vinyl, cd
- Cocoa Tea – Why Turn Down The Sound (1990) 7" & 12" vinyl, cd
- Cocoa Tea & Cutty Ranks – Gang War (1992) 7" & 12" vinyl NOTE: Flip side of the 12" has solo cut from Cocoa Tea
- Cocoa Tea & J.C. Lodge – Time For Love (1991) 7" & 12" vinyl, cd
- Cocoa Tea & Krystal – The More Them Chat (1991) 7" & 12" vinyl, cd
- Cocoa Tea & Nadine Sutherland – It's Now or Never (1990) 7" & 12" vinyl, cd
- Cocoa Tea, Dennis Brown, Freddie McGregor & Mutabaruka – Bone Lies (1993) 7" & 12" vinyl, cd
- Courtney Pine – Get Busy // Kingston (1992) 12" vinyl, cd single, cd
- Cutty Ranks – Wealth (1992) 7" & 12" vinyl, cd
- Daddy Nuttea – My Sound Come Back // My Sound Come Back (Dub) (1993) 12" vinyl, cd NOTE: Label: Delabel – off the album "Paris Kingston Paris" – Song produced/mixed by Gussie Clarke.
- Daddy Rings (a-side) Daddy Rings (aa-side) – Cat & The Fiddle // Big Up All The Hustlers (1997) 7" vinyl, cd
- Daddy Rings (a-side) Daddy Rings & Cocoa Tea – Herb Fi Bun // Herb Fi Bun (Combination) (1997) 7" & 12" vinyl, cd
- Dean Fraser (a-side) Robbie Lyn (aa-side) – He's Got It // Classic (1997) 7" vinyl, cd NOTE: Dean Fraser's – He's Got It appears on the cd release of "Music Works Selections"
- Deborahe Glasgow – Champion Lover (1989) 7" & 12" vinyl, cd
- Deborahe Glasgow – Give Me That Touch (1989) 7" & 12" vinyl, cd
- Deborahe Glasgow & Shabba Ranks – Hardcore Loving (1990) 7" & 12" vinyl, cd
- Deborahe Glasgow & Shabba Ranks (a-side) Little Twitch (aa-side) – Don't Test Me // Can't Stand Me (1990) 12" vinyl
- Dennis Brown – Home Boy (1990) 7" & 12" vinyl, cd
- Dennis Brown – You Know You Want To Be Loved (1990) 7" & 12" vinyl, cd
- Dennis Brown & Cocoa Tea – To The Foundation (1990) 12" vinyl, cd
- Dennis Brown & Gregory Isaacs – Big All Around (1989) 12" vinyl, cd
- Dennis Brown & Tiger – Make Up Your Mind (1990) 7" & 12" vinyl, cd
- Dennis Brown & Fabiana – Mixed Feelings (1991) 7" & 12" vinyl, cd
- Dennis Creary – Ghetto Life (1989) 7" vinyl
- Dennis Creary – Sweet Sixteen (1989) 7" & 12" vinyl
- Donovan – Embarrassment That (1990) 7" vinyl
- E.T. – Bruck Out (1993) cd NOTE: Released on Shabba Ranks – "No Competition" album
- Eek-A-Mouse – Border Patrol (1991) cd – released on Eek-A-Mouse-"U' Neek" album
- Eek-A-Mouse – Rude Boy's A Foreign (1991) 12" vinyl, cd – released on Eek-A-Mouse-"U' Neek" album
- Fabiana & Shabba Ranks – Fancy Girl (1991) 12" vinyl, cd
- Freddie McGregor – Playing Hard To Get (1992) 7" & 12" vinyl, cd
- Freddie McGregor – Midnight Lover (1991) 7" & 12" vinyl, cd
- Freddie McGregor & Cynthia Schloss – Not As Happy (1988) 7" & 12" vinyl, cd
- Freddie McGregor (a-side) Freddie McGregor & Daddy Rings (aa-side) – Rumours // Rumours (DJ Version) (Extended Club Mix) (1997) 12" vinyl, cd single, cd
- Gregory Isaacs – Don't Call Me Baldhead (1993) 7" & 12" vinyl, cd
- Gregory Isaacs – Mind Yu Dis (1989) 12' vinyl, cd
- Gregory Isaacs – Report To Me (1989) 7" & 12" vinyl, cd
- Gregory Isaacs – Rumours (1988) 7" & 12" vinyl, cd
- Gregory Isaacs – Temporary Lover (1997) 7" vinyl, cd NOTE: Appears on the cd release of "Music Works Selections"
- Gregory Isaacs – Thank You (1993) 12 vinyl, cd
- Gregory Isaacs & The Mighty Diamonds – Roughneck (1988) 12" vinyl, cd
- Gregory Isaacs, Freddie McGregor & Ninjaman – John Law Flip side: Above The Law (1991) 7" & 12" vinyl, cd
- Gregory Isaacs (a-side) Dean Fraser (aa-side) – Too Good To Be True // Too Good To Be True (Instrumental) (1989) 12" vinyl, cd
- Gregory Isaacs (a-side) Gregory Isaacs & J.C. Lodge (aa-side) – Don Man Girl // Don Man Girl (Combination) (1993) 12" vinyl, cd (Gregory Isaacs – "Don Man Girl" released on both vinyl and cd)
- Home T – Single Life (1988) 7" & 12" vinyl, cd
- Home T, Cocoa Tea & Shabba Ranks – Pirates Anthem (1989) 7" & 12" vinyl, cd
- Home T, Cocoa Tea & Shabba Ranks – Stop Spreading Rumours (1989) 7" & 12" vinyl, cd
- J.C. Lodge – Hurricane (1989) 12" vinyl, cd
- J.C. Lodge – Operator (1990) 7" & 12" vinyl, cd
- J.C. Lodge – Selfish Lover (1990) 7" & 12" vinyl, cd
- J.C. Lodge – System (1994) cd NOTE: single track produced by Clarke off Japanese import release "Let Love Inside"
- J.C. Lodge – Telephone Love (1990) 7" & 12" vinyl, cd
- J.C. Lodge & Shabba Ranks – Telephone Love De Pon Mi Mind (1990) 12" vinyl, cd
- J.C. Lodge & Sugar Minott – Since You Came Into My Life (1988) 7" & 12" vinyl, cd
- J.C. Lodge & Tiger – Love Me Baby (1990) 7" & 12" vinyl, cd
- J.C. Lodge (a-side) J.C. Lodge (aa-side) – You Don't Really Want My Love // Together We Will Stay (1987) 12" vinyl, cd
- Johnny Osbourne – Trickster (1989) 7" & 12" vinyl, cd
- Johnny Osbourne & Lady G – Sweet Mouth (1989) 7" & 12" vinyl
- Josey Wales – Slackness Done (1989) 7" & 12" vinyl
- Ken Boothe – A Man Is A Man (1988) 12" vinyl, cd
- Krystal – All Around The World (1990) 7" & 12" vinyl, cd
- Krystal – Don't Hold Back – (1990) 7" & 12" vinyl
- Krystal & Shabba Ranks – Steady Man (1990) 12" vinyl, cd
- Krystal & Shabba Ranks – Twice My Age (1990) 7" & 12" vinyl, cd
- Janet Lee Davis – Oops There Goes My Heart (1991) 12" vinyl
- Lady G – Certain Friends (1992) 7" & 12" vinyl, cd
- Lady G – Dem Things No Right (1989) 7" & 12" vinyl
- Lady G – License Your Hand (1989) 7" & 12" vinyl
- Lady G – Man Dem A Get Tight (1989) 7" 12" vinyl, cd
- Lady G – Nuff Respect (1988) 7" & 12" vinyl, cd
- Lady G (a-side) Lady G (aa-side) – Too Much Gun Talk // Pay The People Dem (1993) 7" vinyl
- Lady G & Shabba Ranks – Fanciness (Ragga Mix) (1991) 7" & 12" vinyl, cd NOTE: Flip side has Original Mix which is an entirely different riddim to the Ragga Mix
- Maxi Priest – Hard To Get (1992) cd NOTE: song from the 'Fe Real' album
- Maxi Priest – Just A Little Bit Longer (1990) 12" vinyl, cd NOTE: song from the 'Bonafide' album
- Maxi Priest – Not On My Own (1990) cd – NOTE: b-side to Peace Throughout the World single
- Maxi Priest – Temptress (1990) cd NOTE: song from the 'Bonafide' album
- Maxi Priest & Tiger – I Know Love (1990) cd – NOTE: b-side to Close to You single
- Nadine Sutherland – Don't Take Your Love Away (1988) 7" & 12" vinyl, cd
- Nadine Sutherland – Just You and Me Tonight (1988) 7" & 12" vinyl, cd
- Nadine Sutherland – Mr Hard To Please (1989) 7" & 12" vinyl, cd
- Papa San – Dancehall Good To We (1990) 7" & 12" vinyl, cd
- Papa San & Fabiana – It's Not Enough (1990) 7" & 12" vinyl, cd
- Papa San & Lady G – Round Table Talk (1990) 7" & 12" vinyl, cd
- Peter Hunningale – A Love Like This (1990) 7" vinyl, cd
- Rebel Princess – One More Time (1993) 7" & 12" vinyl
- Rebel Princess, Cocoa Tea & Shabba Ranks – Just Be Good To Me (1990) 7" & 12" vinyl, cd
- Rebel Rockers – We Belong Together (1990) 7" & 12" vinyl NOTE: AKA – Rebel Princess
- Robert French – A Little More Time (1990) 7" & 12" vinyl
- Sanchez & Cynthia Schloss – I'm Your Puppet (1990) 12" vinyl, cd
- Sanchez & Lady G (a-side) Krystal (aa-side) – Half My Age // Twice My Age (1990) 12" vinyl, cd
- Sasha (a-side) Sasha & Shaka Shamba (aa-side – Girls // Black & White (1997) 7" vinyl, cd
- Shabba Ranks – No Bother Dis (Rude Boy) (1989) 12" vinyl, cd
- Shinehead – The Real Rock (1990) 12" vinyl, cd NOTE: remixed by the Music Works Crew
- Spanner Banner – Faith (1990) 7" & 12" vinyl
- Sophia George – Hot Stuff (1989) 7" & 12" vinyl, cd
- Stefan Penicillin – Tek Book (2004) 7" vinyl
- Sugar Minott – Funking Song (1988) 12" vinyl, cd
- The Mighty Diamonds – (a-side) The Mighty Diamonds (aa-side) – Gang War // Teenage Pregnancy (1987) 12" vinyl, cd [NOTE: Teenage Pregnancy appears on 12" vinyl only]
- The Mighty Diamonds – Mr. Bodyguard (1991) 7" & 12" vinyl, cd
- The Mighty Diamonds – (a-side) The Mighty Diamonds (aa-side) – Heavy Load // Warmonger (1988) 7" & 12" vinyl, cd [NOTE: Warmonger appears on 12" vinyl only]
- Thriller U – Before and After (1995) single track on cd
- Thriller U – What Have I Done (1996) single track on cd

== Compilations of Clarke's productions ==
- Black Foundation (1976)
- Black Foundation Dub (1976)
- Augustus Clarke – Greensleeves 12" Rulers
- Crucial Reggae Driven By Sly & Robbie (1982)
- Funny Feeling (197?)
- Gussie Presenting The Right Tracks (1976)
- Music Works Sho'Case (1982)
- Music Works Vol 1 (1971–83)
- Music Works vol 2 (1971–83)
- The Best in the Business (1980)
- Ram Dancehall (1989)
- Hardcore Ragga (1990)
