= Ras Midas =

Jamaican musician

- Born: 1958 (age 66–67); Clarendon Parish, Jamaica
- Genres: Reggae, disco
- Occupations: Singer, songwriter, music producer
- Instrument: Congo drum
- Years active: 1974–present
- Labels: Trojan, Island, JML
- Website: www.rasmidas.com

Ras Midas (born 1958, Clarendon Parish, Jamaica) is a reggae artist and a member of the Rastafari movement. He gained significant recognition for his album Rastaman in Exile. At the age of 13, he relocated to the United Kingdom. Midas embarked on his music career in 1968, and subsequently found popularity among reggae audiences in France before eventually moving to the United States. He currently resides in Jacksonville, Florida.

== Discography ==
- Kudea-A-Bamba (1978), Island/Harry J
- Rain & Fire (1979), Island/Harry J
- Rastaman in Exile (1980), SKEJ/Disc AZ
- Stand Up Wise Up (1984), Celluloid
- Loving Vibration (1996), Worldwide
- Confirmation (2000), JML
- Reaching Out (2008), White Eagle
- Fire Up (2010), JML
