= Soul Syndicate =

Jamaican reggae band

- Origin: Kingston, Jamaica
- Genres: Reggae
- Years active: Early 1970s–present
- Members: Earl "Chinna" Smith; Carlton "Santa" Davis; George "Fully" Fullwood; Tony Chin; Bernard "Touter" Harvey; Keith Sterling; Newsville "Fuzzy" Foster; Leroy "Horsemouth" Wallace; Cleon Douglas; Earl Lindo; Tyrone Downie; Donovan Carless

Soul Syndicate, originally called the Rhythm Raiders, were one of the top reggae session bands in Jamaica from the early 1970s to the mid-1980s.

== History ==
In the first half of the 1970s the band from the Greenwich Farm area of Kingston recorded for producers such as Keith Hudson, Winston Holness (under the pseudonym The Observers), Duke Reid and others on some of the most popular and influential recordings of the era. Core members of the band are guitarist Earl "Chinna" Smith, drummer Carlton "Santa" Davis, bassist and founder of Soul Syndicate George "Fully" Fullwood, rhythm guitarist Tony Chin and keyboard player Bernard "Touter" Harvey, later with Keith Sterling on keyboards. Other members at various times included drummer Leroy "Horsemouth" Wallace, alto saxophonist Newsville "Fuzzy" Foster, guitarist Cleon Douglas, and keyboard players Earl Lindo and Tyrone Downie. Freddie McGregor was at one time the band's featured vocalist. The nucleus of the band also recorded under the name The Aggrovators for Bunny Lee. As well as playing on countless releases backing some of Jamaica's top vocalists, including Dennis Brown and Gregory Isaacs, they also released several albums credited to the band. Harvey later became a member of The Wailers Band.

According to guitarist Tony Chin, "Sun is Shining" (1978) was the first song members of the band recorded with Bob Marley. Soul Syndicate is also credited with recording the original versions of the Wailers' tunes "Small Axe" and "Mr. Brown".

The Soul Syndicate's "Stalag 17" and "Taxi" bass lines, are among many bass lines created by George "Fully" Fullwood, an instrumental, featuring Ansell Collins on organ who was a resident studio musician for Soul Syndicate in the 1970s, was much-versioned, providing the basis for hits over the two decades that followed for Big Youth, Horace Andy, Augustus Pablo, Frankie Paul, General Echo, Tenor Saw and others. Soul Syndicate is accredited with performing on singles featuring many vocalists and feature artists including: Roy Shirley, Max Romeo, Cynthia Richards, Keith Hudson, Winston Jarrett, Dirty Harry, Bobby Ellis, Lenroy Muffatt & the Soul Tops, Joe Gibbs, Romax & Elaine, Maria Baines, Abdul Sabuza, Leonard Dillon, Junior Byles, Prince Alla, Errol Alphanso, African Brothers, Bim Sherman, Bobby Kalphat, Bim Man, Eli & Chen, Jah Carlos, Dillinger, I-Roy, Junior Delgado, Ingrid Scott, Country Joe, L. Moodie, Phillip Frazer, Freddie McGregor, Tony Tuff, Willie Brackenridge, Ashanti Waugh & D.J. Baller Joe, Augustus Pablo, Sheena Spirit & The Third Eye, King Tubby, King Jango, The Heptones, Nora Jean, Alton Ellis, U-Roy, H. Cunningham, Cornell Campbell, Shenley Duffus, The Stingers, Johnny Cool, Sylvan White, Robert Scott, Blue Flame, Jimmy London, Enos McLeod, Mary Mundy, Dr. Alimantado, Dizzy, Lloyd A. Lawrence, Glen Lee & the Vandells, Charles Bennett, Porkey & Cynthia, Derrick Morgan, Badoo, Tony Brevett, Johnnie "Dizzy" Moore, Winston Fergus and Niney.

== Reunion ==
In 2015, the band reunited and performed at Huntington Beach, California. The line-up for the performance included George "Fully" Fullwood, Tony Chin, Earl "Chinna" Smith, Carlton "Santa" Davis, Soul Syndicate's original vocalist Donovan Carless and Keith Sterling.

In Summer 2016, Soul Syndicate re-united once again to perform at Reggae on the River in Northern California. There, they backed six artists including Big Youth, U-Roy, Earl Zero, Marty Dread, Nature and Randy Valentine. The band featured George "Fully" Fullwood on bass, Tony "Valentine" Chin on rhythm guitar, Keith Sterling on keys, Karl Wright on drums, Vince Black on lead guitar, Glenn Holdaway on trumpet, Warren Huang on saxophone and Mad Professor controlling the mix.

In mid 2024, they also re-united again to perform at Rototom Reggae Sunsplash in Benicàssim, Spain. They were backing Andrew, the son of Peter Tosh. The band featured Fullwood on bass, Chin on rhythm guitar, Sterling on keys, Smith on lead and Carlton "Santa" Davis on drums.

== Discography ==
=== Albums ===
- Harvest Uptown, Famine Downtown (1977) London/Soul Syndicate
- Moodie In Dub Vol 1 (1978) Moodie Music (Black Slate & The Soul Syndicate)
- Nuh Skin Up Dub (1979) Keith Hudson & The Soul Syndicate
- Only Jah Can Ease The Pressure (1979) Earl Zero And The Soul Syndicate
- Was, Is, & Always (1980) High Times/Epiphany
- Visions Of Love (1980) Earl Zero With The Soul Syndicate
- Roots Radics Meet Soul Syndicate In Dub (198?) Razor Sounds (with Roots Radics)
- Friends and Family (1996) Epiphany

=== Compilations ===
- Freedom Sounds In Dub (1996) Blood & Fire (King Tubby & The Soul Syndicate)
- The Rough Guide to Dub (2005) World Music Network
- Dub Classics (2006) Jamaican Recordings

=== DVD ===
- Word, Sound and Power (2008), MVD
