= Steve Barrow =

British journalist (1945–2026)

Steve Barrow (29 September 1945 – 27 May 2026) was a British reggae historiographer, chronologist, archivist, journalist, curator, writer, promoter, sound system operator, record-label owner and producer.

== Life and career ==
While at Honest Jon's record shop, Barrow met Peter Dalton, with whom he later collaborated on writing The Rough Guide to Reggae. Between 1979 and 1980, he was hired freelance by Island Records to compile a series of vinyl releases: Intensified, More Intensified, Catch The Beat and The Blue Beat Years. From the 1970s and up to 1992, he compiled many albums and wrote liner notes for Trojan Records in London.

In 1993 Barrow co-founded the Blood and Fire record label with Simply Red's Mick Hucknall, specialising in reissuing older roots reggae and spiritual dubwise Jamaican music. Barrow's extensive knowledge of reggae was the catalyst for the creation of the Jamaican Reggae Archive Project which is funded and owned by Chris Blackwell with Barrow as de facto chronologist, historiographer and curator. Between 1994 and 1995, Barrow (along with Don Letts and Rick Elwood) conducted a series of interviews with Jamaican artists for the archive that aimed to preserve the history of the music. The interviews and other related material were an important factor in the writing of the book The Rough Guide to Reggae. The reggae author David Katz credits Barrow's personal recommendation to Trevor Wyatt of Island Records with his involvement in the compiling of the 1997 Lee "Scratch" Perry CD set Arkology.

In 2004, Barrow co-founded the reggae reissue label Hot Pot Music. In 2012 Soul Jazz published Reggae Soundsystem: Original Reggae Album Cover Art compiled by Steve Barrow, Stuart Baker and Reggae 45 Soundsytem: The Label Art of Reggae Singles compiled by Steve Barrow, Noel Hawks and Stuart Baker.

Barrow died on 27 May 2026, aged 80.

== Bibliography ==
- The Rough Guide to Reggae with Peter Dalton, 1997 for the first edition, Rough Guides Limited, ISBN 1-85828-247-0
- The Rough Guide Reggae: 100 Essential Cds, 1999, Rough Guides Limited, ISBN 1-85828-567-4
- King Jammy's, with Beth Lesser, 2002, ECW Press, UK, ISBN 1-55022-525-1
