= Johnny Clarke =

Jamaican reggae musician

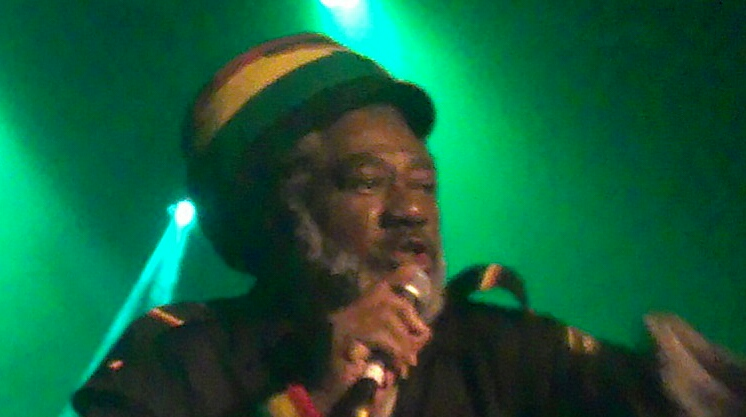
- Johnnie Clarke performance inside the Fairmount Theatre in Montreal, Quebec, Canada.

Background information
- Born: 12 January 1955 (age 70)
- Origin: Whitfield Town, Kingston, Jamaica
- Genres: Reggae
- Instruments: Vocals
- Years active: 1971–present
- Labels: Front Line, Hit Machine

Johnny Clarke (born 12 January 1955) is a Jamaican reggae musician, best known for his recordings with producer Bunny Lee in the 1970s.

== Biography ==
Clarke grew up in the Kingston ghetto of Whitfield Town and attended Jamaica College. In 1971 he won a talent contest in Bull Bay, his prize a meeting with producer Clancy Eccles, with whom he recorded his first song, "God Made the Sea and the Sun", the following year. The single didn't sell well, and disappointed with the lack of promotion from Eccles, he moved on to Rupie Edwards, who produced Clarke's first hits in 1973, with "Everyday Wondering" and "Julie". In 1974, Clarke moved on again, recording "Jump Back Baby" for Glen Brown, before beginning a long association with Bunny Lee and his band The Aggrovators in 1974. "None Shall Escape the Judgement" was an immediate success and became the title track on Clarke's debut album.

Clarke was named Artist of the Year in Jamaica in both 1975 and 1976, and became one of the most popular singers on the island, mixing original songs with covers of popular reggae songs by other artists, and mixing roots and lovers-themed material. Many of Clarke's songs concern his faith as a Rasta and the beliefs of the Rastafari movement, including anti-violence (as on "Let Go Violence") and legalization of marijuana ("Legalize It"). He helped define the "Flying Cymbals" period that preceded the "Roots Rockers" sound of the mid- to late 1970s. Clarke was one of the first Jamaican artists signed to Virgin Records' Frontline subsidiary in 1976, releasing the albums Authorized Version and Rockers Time Now on the label. Clarke enjoyed further hits in the early 1980s with producer S Douglas, before working again with Lee. His popularity in Jamaica, however, declined, and he relocated to London in 1983, recording with Mad Professor, as well as further recordings for Jamaican producers King Tubby, Errol Thompson, and Prince Jammy. He has since occasionally reappeared with new material - Rasta Nuh Fear in 1992, and Rock With Me in 1997 - and continues to tour regularly. His song "None Shall Escape the Judgement" was featured on the Trojan roots compilations.

Clarke is known for his so-called "African Roots" or knee-length dreadlocks, which, when performing live, he frequently conceals inside a large hat. At the climax of his concert, he removes his hat, revealing his "African Roots" to the audience.

He set up his own Hit Machine label, his first album on the label being Jamaica 50 Johnny Clarke Sing Then Dub Them, released in 2012 to coincide with the 50th anniversary of Jamaican independence.

== Studio albums ==
- None Shall Escape (1974) Total Sounds
- Moving Out (1975) Total Sounds
- Enter Into His Gates With Praise (1975)
- Sings In Fine Style (1975)
- I'm Gonna Put It On (1975) Vulcan
- No Woman No Cry (1976) Total Sounds
- Authorised Version (1976) Frontline
- Rocker's Time Now (1976) Frontline
- Don't Stay Out Late (1976) Paradise
- Up Park Camp (1977) Justice
- Girl I Love You (1977) Justice
- Sweet Conversation (1978) Third World
- King of the Arena (1978) Third World
- Satisfaction (1979) Third World
- Down In a Babylon (1980) Cha Cha
- I Man Come Again (1982) Black Music
- Yard Style (1983) Ariwa
- Reggae Party (1984)
- Sly & Robbie Present the Best of Johnny Clarke (1985) Vista Sounds
- Give Thanks (1985) Ariwa
- Enter into His Gates with praise (1989) Attack
- Rasta Nuh Fear (1992) Sonic Sounds
- Don't trouble trouble (1994) Attack
- Rock With Me (1997)
- Reggae Heights (2003) Mafia & Fluxy
- Jamaica 50 Johnny Clarke Sing Then Dub Them (2012), Hit Machine
