= Noel Simms =

Background information
- Also known as: Skully
- Born: Noel Bartholomew Simms; 18 March 1935; Kingston, Jamaica
- Died: 4 February 2017 (aged 81) Alligator Reef, Florida, U.S.
- Genres: Ska; Rocksteady; Reggae
- Occupation: Musician
- Instrument: Percussion
- Years active: 1953–2017

Noel Bartholomew Simms (18 March 1935 – 4 February 2017), better known by his nickname and artistic names Scully or Zoot, was a Jamaican ska, rocksteady and reggae percussionist and vocalist.

== Biography ==
Born in the Smith Village area of Kingston in 1935 and educated at the Alpha Boys School, he initially worked as a singer in a duo with his schoolfriend Arthur "Bunny" Robinson, known as Simms & Robinson and later Bunny & Scully. The duo won the Vere Johns talent contest two years running and were the first Jamaican artists to make R&B records on the island, starting with acetates for sound system use in 1953 (previous Jamaican-made singles were calypso). They went on to release singles in the early 1960s for producer Clement "Coxsone" Dodd, with Simms also recording solo sides for Prince Buster, and as part of another duo, Simms & Elmond. He was one of the first Jamaican musicians to use Amharic phrases in songs after learning them from Rasta leader Mortimer Planno, with tracks such as "Golden Pen" and "Press Along" in the early 1960s.

As a percussionist, he has performed as a member of several bands, including the Aggrovators, the Upsetters, the Revolutionaries, and Roots Radics, and has recorded and performed with Big Youth, Peter Tosh (playing in the All-Star Band at the One Love Peace Concert), Dillinger and the Heptones, playing on more than 200 albums between 1971 and 1985. He toured Europe with The Jamaica All Stars along with Justin Hinds, Johnny "Dizzy" Moore and Sparrow Martin. He also played in a backing band for Jimmy Cliff. On recordings, he is credited under many different names, including: Noel "Scully" Simms, Noel "Skully" Simms, Scully, Scully Simms, Skullie, Skully, Skully Simms, Zoot "Scully" Simms, Mikey Spratt, Scollie, Zoot Sims, mr foundation and Skitter. African Challenge, one of his most well-known recordings for Coxsone Dodd and sung entirely in Amharic, was recorded under the name of Zoot Sims.

In 1978, Scully made a brief cameo in the film Rockers, directed by Ted Bafaloukos. He was also part of the Rockers All Stars, the group responsible for the film's instrumental music.

In 2004, along with his former singing partner Robinson, Simms received a Badge of Honour from the Jamaican government in recognition of their contribution to Jamaican music.

Simms lost his sight to glaucoma. Despite this, he kept on recording and writing songs, including "Africa for the Africans".

Simms died on 4 February 2017, having been diagnosed with lung cancer two years earlier.
