= Valentine Chin =

Jamaican guitarist

Tony Chin
- Born: Albert Valentine Chin
- Origin: Kingston, Jamaica
- Genres: Reggae
- Instrument: Guitar
- Years active: 1960s–present

Albert Valentine "Tony" Chin is a Jamaican guitarist, who has collaborated with many reggae artists including Bob Marley, Dennis Brown, Gregory Isaacs, Freddie McGregor, Bunny Wailer, Big Youth, U-Roy, Max Romeo, Don Carlos, Mikey Dread, Burning Spear, Johnny Clarke and many others.

He started as a drummer but he switched to guitar when he teamed up with bassist George "Fully" Fullwood to form the Riddim Raiders in the late 60s playing rocksteady. It was the same band which later evolved to the Soul Syndicate, a backing band on countless reggae tracks, They recorded for Keith Hudson, Niney the Observer, and Bunny Lee, and other Jamaican record producers.

Quite a distinct sound to his guitar playing, Chin played a crucial part in the "flyers" sound of the mid-1970s, popularised by Bunny Lee.

In the 1981 Chin moved to California, joining forces with Jack Miller and his International Reggae All Star and playing played in the band that supported Peter Tosh's son Andrew Tosh. In the 1990s. Chin lived in Florida, where he joined the successful US reggae band Big Mountain. He currently lives in Los Angeles and plays with Soul Syndicate bassist George "Fully" Fullwood.
