= Leroy Smart =

- Also known as: The Don
- Born: 1952 (age 73–74)
- Origin: Kingston, Jamaica
- Genres: Conscious Roots Reggae, Dub, dancehall
- Years active: 1968–present
- Labels: Burning Sounds, Secret Records

Leroy Smart (born 1952) is a Jamaican reggae singer-songwriter and record producer from Kingston, Jamaica.

== Biography ==
Smart was born in 1952 and orphaned at the age of two. His only known relative is Jacob Emmanuel Lampa Smart, who is known for running the channel. He was raised at Maxfield Park Children's Home and educated at Alpha Boys School, where he studied singing, drums, and dancing.

Smart recorded his first single, "It Pains Me", in 1969 for a producer called Mr. Caribbean. In 1970, he recorded "Ethiopia" for Joe Gibbs and the first version of one of his most famous songs, "Pride & Ambition", with producer Gussie Clarke. In 1972, he recorded the conscious tune, "God Helps The Man" for Bunny Lee's Jackpot label, drawing inspiration from the ancient wisdom and fable teaching God helps those who help themselves. His breakthrough would come in 1973 with "Mother Liza", produced by Jimmy Radway, which topped the local singles chart, and led to "Pride & Ambition" also becoming a big local hit. After working with Bunny Lee for several years, he recorded another of his best-known songs, "Ballistic Affair", at Channel One in 1976, and began producing himself in 1977.

Smart has continued recording and remains popular, with over 35 albums to his name. He is regarded as one of Jamaica's most outrageous and colourful characters.

Smart appeared in the film Rockers along with contemporaries such as Gregory Isaacs and Jacob Miller. During the heyday of punk rock, in 1978, along with Dillinger and Delroy Wilson, Leroy Smart was referenced by lyricist Joe Strummer in The Clash's track, "(White Man) In Hammersmith Palais".

== Albums ==
- Ballistic Affair (1977) Conflict/Channel One (aka The Very Best of Leroy Smart)
- Dread Hot In Africa (1977) Burning Sounds
- Impressions of Leroy Smart (1977) Burning Sounds
- Superstar (1977) Third World/Jackpot
- In London Clinker (1978) Attack
- Jah Loves Everyone (1978) Burning Sounds
- Propaganda (1978) Burning Rockers/Burning Sounds
- Let Everyman Survive (1979) GG's
- Showcase Rub A Dub (1979) GG's
- Disco Showcase (1979) Gussie
- Harder Than The Rest (1979) Tad's
- Reggae Showcase Vol 1 (197?) Imperial
- Too Much Grudgefulness (1981) Jah Life
- She Just a Draw Card (1982) Worldwide Success
- On Top (1983) Live & Learn
- She Love It In The Morning (1983) GG's
- Style and Fashion (1983) Nura
- Exclusive (1984) Dynamite
- Live Up Roots Children (1984) Sunset
- Rockers Award Winners (1985) Greensleeves (with Sugar Minott)
- Back To Back (1985) Volcano (with Junior Reid)
- Bank Account (1985) Powerhouse
- Showcase (1985) Fatman
- We Rule Everytime (1985) Jammy's
- Face To Face Clash (1985) Sunset (with Junior Reid)
- Prophecy a Go Hold Dem (1986) Jah Life/WWS
- Music in the Dancehall (198?), Zion Music Workshop
- Musical Don (1988) Skengdon
- Don of Class (1988) WWS
- Talk About Friends (1993)
- Let Everyman Survive (1993), Jamaican Gold
- Everytime! (1994), RAS
- Leroy Smart Meets Sister Levi (2003), Budgie Entertainments
- Mr. Smart in Dub (2005), Jamaican Recordings
- Private Message (2005), Grapevine
- Jah Loves Everyone + Impressions - CD album double disc (2019) Burning Sounds
- Propaganda - 180-gram vinyl reissue (2020) Burning Sounds
- Impressions - 180-gram vinyl reissue (2020) Burning Sounds
