= Big Youth =

Jamaican deejay (born 1949)

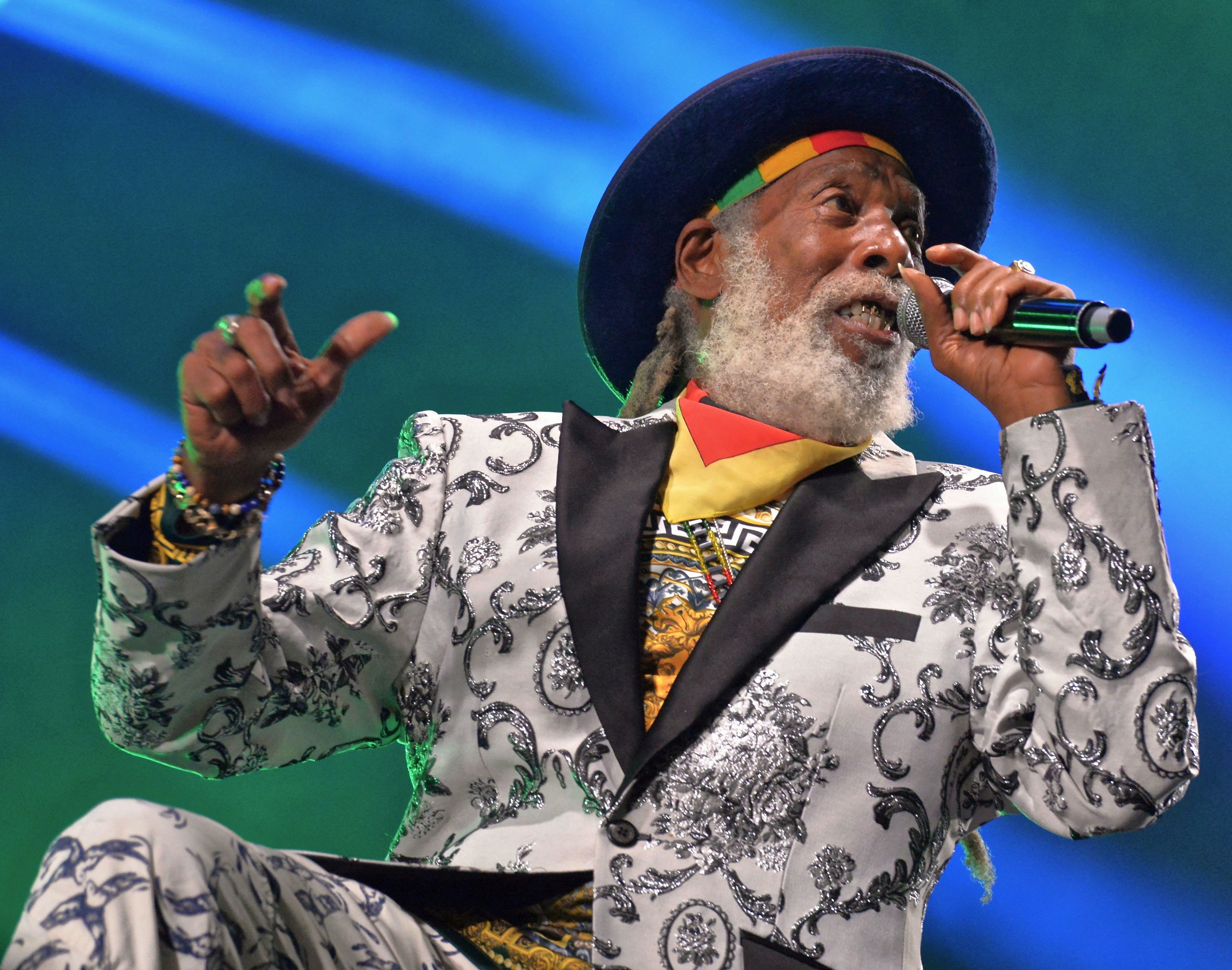
- Big Youth, Reggae Geel, 3 August 2019, Belgium.

Background information
- Born: Manley Augustus Buchanan; 19 April 1949 (age 77)
- Origin: Kingston, Jamaica
- Genres: Reggae; R&B; soul; dub; dancehall
- Occupations: Deejay; singer; songwriter
- Instrument: Vocals

Manley Augustus Buchanan (born 19 April 1949, Trenchtown, Kingston, Jamaica), better known as Big Youth (sometimes called Jah Youth), is a Jamaican deejay, mostly known for his work during the 1970s.

He commented, "Deejays were closest to the people because there wasn't any kind of establishment control on the sound systems".

== Biography ==
=== Early career ===
Before beginning his musical career, Buchanan worked as a diesel mechanic at Kingston's Sheraton Hotel, where he would develop his toasting skills while he worked, and was nicknamed "Big Youth" by his co-workers. He started to perform at dances, initially influenced by U-Roy, and became a regular with Lord Tippertone's sound system by 1970, becoming the resident deejay, and attracting the attention of Kingston's record producers. His early 45 singles for producers such as Jimmy Radway ("The Best Big Youth"), Lee Perry ("Moving Version") and Phil Pratt ("Tell It Black") were artistically and commercially unsuccessful.

=== 1970s peak ===
By 1972 he had begun working with Augustus "Gussie" Clarke, a teenage producer whose rhythms and singers were more in tune with the vibes on the streets of Kingston, and "The Killer" (on a version of Horace Andy's "Skylarking" rhythm) became his first major Jamaican hit record, soon followed by "Tippertone Rocking". Following this, he released the successful "S-90 Skank", featuring a motorbike being revved in the studio, for Keith Hudson's Imbidmts label, versioning the producer's own "We Will Work It Out". This became his first Jamaican number one hit, and also featured in a television advert for the Honda motorcycle that inspired it. The first album to feature his vocals, Chi Chi Run was produced by Prince Buster in 1972. Distinctive musically, his half-sung style contrasting with his contemporaries, he was also visually distinctive, with his teeth inlaid with red, gold, and green jewels.

During the early 1970s, openly Rastafarian musicians often faced discrimination within Jamaica's music industry. In early 1973, Big Youth revealed his dreadlocks during a performance at Kingston's Carib Theatre, drawing an enthusiastic audience response. According to music historian Lloyd Bradley, the incident reflected the growing acceptance of Rastafarian culture within Jamaican popular music.

In 1973, he released his first album entitled Screaming Target, produced by Gussie Clarke. The album is still considered as a classic of its genre, featuring rhythms from well-known hits by Gregory Isaacs, Leroy Smart, and Lloyd Parks, among others. Around this time, he also notched up some achievements in the singles chart, having seven singles in the chart at one time, and having four singles remain in the top 20 for an entire year. Throughout 1974 and 1975, he continued to record for other producers, including Glen Brown ("Dubble Attack"), The Abyssinians ("I Pray Thee"/"Dreader than Dread"), Yabby You ("Yabby Youth" – later known as "Lightning Flash (Weak Heart Drop)"), Bunny Wailer ("Bide"/"Black on Black") and Joe Gibbs ("Medecine Doctor").

His next LP, Dreadlocks Dread, was released in 1976 on Klik Records, a label which described itself as a "progressive Black Music Company, specialising in rebel-dread Reggae, modern Soul and Disco sounds." Although ostensibly a Big Youth LP produced by "Prince" Tony Robinson, it in fact only featured six vocal tracks, two of which – "Marcus Garvey Dread" (originally "Mosia Garvey" on Jack Ruby's Fox label) and "Lightning Flash" had been released as singles for other producers.

By this time he had begun releasing his own self-produced recordings on the Negusa Nagast and Augustus Buchanan labels in Jamaica, sometimes buying rhythms from producers for whom he had worked, but latterly using his own musicians, usually the Soul Syndicate band. Many of his singles, such as "Hot Stock", and "Battle of the Giants" (with U-Roy) were released on this imprint. His first self-produced LP was Reggae Phenomenon in 1974. His self-productions continued with Natty Cultural Dread in 1976, followed later that year by Hit the Road Jack. He covered "Wake Up Everybody" and "What a World Needs Now" also. This was helpful, as new young DJs such as Trinity and Clint Eastwood were appearing on the scene, and Big Youth's chanting style was becoming less fashionable.

He signed to Virgin Records' Frontline label in 1977, his first release on the label being the Isaiah First Prophet of Old album, and he also appeared in the film Rockers. Virgin declined the chance to release his next three albums, however, and as the 1970s came to a close, Big Youth's popularity took a dip. By 1982, events had combined to make reggae much less successful than it had been five years earlier. The rising tide of violence had driven many musicians and producers to leave Jamaica for the UK and US; reggae had not broken through to widespread commercial success, and, in the wake of Bob Marley's death a lot of major labels either dropped their Jamaican artists or spent little on promoting them, and the music returned to its insular roots. "Slackness" (sexually explicit lyrics) became far more fashionable than cultural Rastafari movement, and teenagers looked more towards the United States for their heroes. While his records continued to find a market, tunes like "Jah Jah Golden Jubilee", "A Luta Continua" and "Chanting" failed to capture the public imagination.

=== 1980s onwards ===
The modern digital rhythms were far from suited to Big Youth's style, and his forays into the studio became less frequent. His appearance at Reggae Sunsplash in 1982 (he would appear another four times between 1983 and 1996) was well received, but his success during the 1980s was limited. His career revived in 1990, with the "Chanting" single, produced by Winston "Niney" Holness, and "Free South Africa" on the protest album One Man One Vote.

Yes, me come inna de music as Rasta, me a de original rastaman who enter it.

— Big Youth, Italy, 2001

In the 2000s, Big Youth teamed up with modern dub producer Twilight Circus to record two notable singles "Daniel in the Lions Den" and "What We Need Is Love", in a style hearkening to the sound of Youth's vintage 1970s classics.

== Discography ==
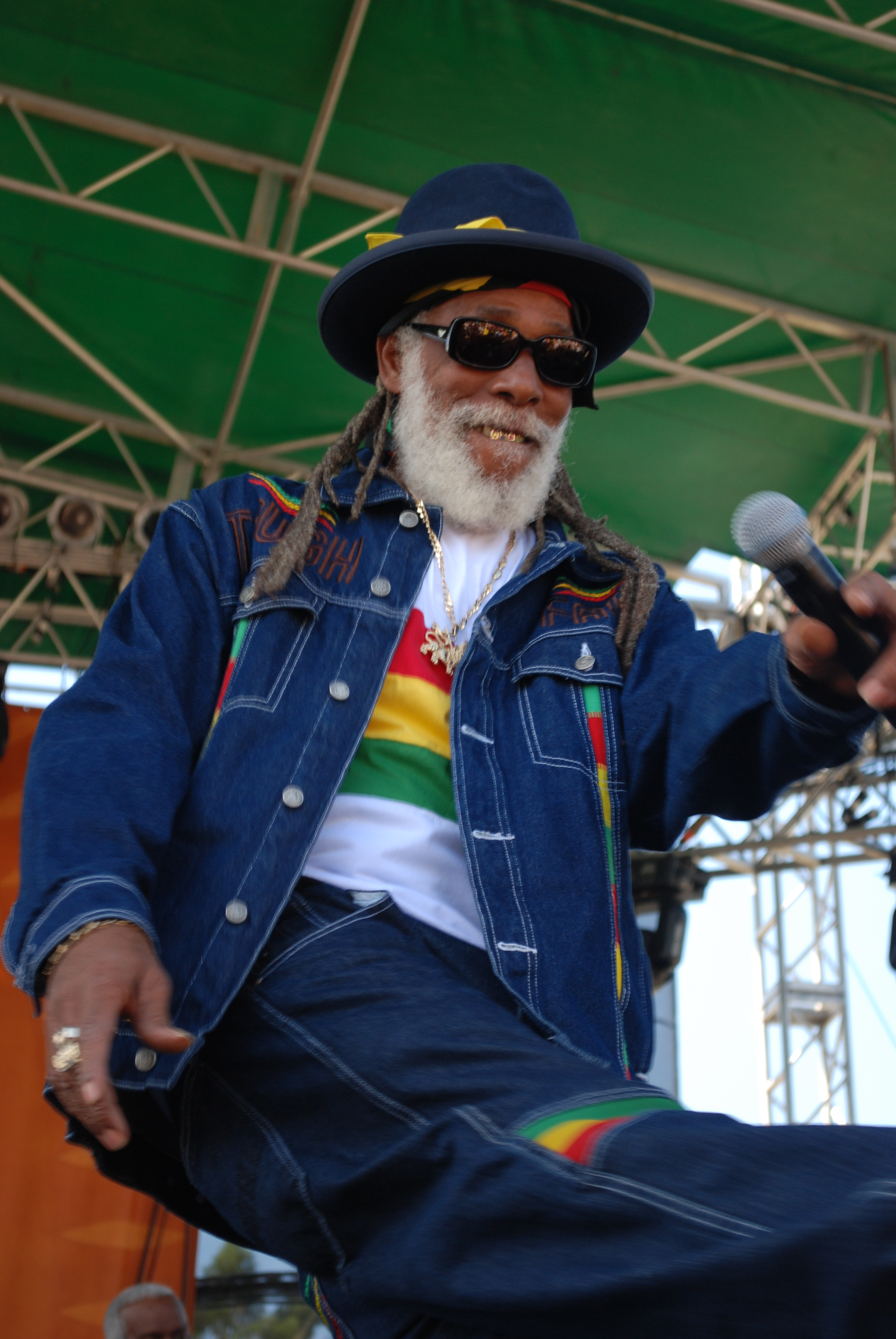
Big Youth performing in 2010.

- Chi Chi Run – Fab 1972 (feat. Big Youth on four out of eleven tracks)
- Screaming Target – Trojan 1973
- Reggae Phenomenon – Augustus Buchanen 1974
- Dreadlocks Dread – Klick 1975
- Cool Breeze – Ride Like Lightning – The Best of Big Youth 1972–1976
- Natty Cultural Dread – Trojan 1976
- Hit the Road Jack – Trojan 1976
- Reggae Gi Dem Dub – Nicola Delita 1978
- Isaiah First Prophet of Old – Nicola Delita, Caroline Records 1978
- Progress – Nicola Delita 1979
- Everyday Skank (The Best of Big Youth) – Trojan TRLS 189 1980
- Rock Holy – Negusa Negast 1980
- Some Great Big Youth – Heartbeat 1981
- Chanting Dread Inna Fine Style – Heartbeat 1982
- Live at Reggae Sunsplash – Genes 1983
- A Luta Continua – Heartbeat 1985
- Manifestation – Heartbeat 1988
- Jamming in the House of Dread – Danceteria 1991
- Higher Grounds – JR, VP Records 1995
- Save the Children – Declic 1995
- Natty Universal Dread 1973–1979 – Blood & Fire 2000
- Musicology – Steven Stanley's studios (Tuff Gong) 2006
- No Jestering – Strictly Sensi Music (with Sista Sensi) 2016
- Beyond The Blue – Jarring Effects (with Brain Damage) 2021
