= Errol Thompson (sound engineer) =

- Also known as: ET
- Born: Errol Thompson; 29 December 1948
- Origin: Kingston, Jamaica
- Died: 13 November 2004 (aged 55)
- Genres: Reggae, ska, dub
- Occupation: Record producer
- Years active: 1960s–1980s

Errol Thompson (29 December 1948 – 13 November 2004), better known as "ET", was a Jamaican record producer, audio engineer, and one of the first studio engineers to be involved in dub music.

== Career ==
Thompson gained studio experience at Studio One, working alongside Joe Gibbs. He went on to work for Bunny Lee and in the 1970s he worked (along with Niney) as an engineer at Randy's Studio 17, in Kingston, Jamaica. Thompson engineered the first instrumental reggae album, The Undertaker by Derrick Harriott And The Crystalites, released in 1970.

While working at Randy's, Thompson engineered sessions by Lee "Scratch" Perry and the Wailers. Thompson worked alongside Perry at the mixing board and became familiar with how the Wailers' voices sounded, allowing him to set up the recordings accordingly. He also applied effects including reverb and delay, encouraged by Perry. He also applied effects including reverb and delay to their recordings, encouraged by Perry.

He went on to work with Joe Gibbs from 1975. Gibbs and Thompson were known collectively as the Mighty Two. Together they produced music by Junior Byles, Dennis Brown, Gregory Isaacs, Althea and Donna, Prince Far I and Eek-A-Mouse, before their partnership ended in 1983 when Gibbs relocated to Miami.

Thompson also engineered tracks by Bob Marley, The Abyssinians, Augustus Pablo, Big Youth, Culture, Yellowman, Frankie Paul and Burning Spear. In addition, he produced work by I-Roy, Cornell Campbell, Freddie McGregor, and Barrington Levy. Thompson also worked with producer, Clive Chin. His final project, the "Hard Times Riddim", co-produced with Stephen Gibson, son of partner Joe Gibbs, was instrumental in creating a resurgence in dancehall. The album included many key reggae performers of the time including, Capleton, I Wayne, Richie Spice, Chuck Fenda, and Luciano.

Later in life, he moved away from the music industry and managed a supermarket in North Parade, downtown Kingston. Thompson died, after numerous strokes, on 13 November 2004, at the age of 55.

== Discography ==
Albums

=== With King Tubby ===
- King Tubby / Errol Thompson - The Black Foundation In Dub (2000, Heartbeat Records)

Singles & EPs

- Jamaican Born & Bred / Version (7") (1971, Ashanti)
- Prince Far I / Errol Thompson - Same Knife / Different Dagger (7") (1999, Crazy Joe)
- The Stones, Errol Thompson & The Mighty Artons - Penetrate (7")
- Linval Thompson / Scientist & Errol Thompson - Touch Up The Key (7")
- Johnnie Clarke / Errol Thompson, Joe Gibbs & The Professionals - Take Heed / Look Out (7")
- The Echoes / Joe Gibbs, Errol Thompson & The Professionals - Problems In Being A Dread / Dread Problems (7")
- Errol Thompson / J Gibson & Clint Eastwood / Bigger T - Production Plan / Million Dollar Plan (7")
- Kojack & Miss Glitter / Joe Gibbs & Errol Thompson - I Can't Stop Loving You / Loving You (7")

Contributing artist

- The Rough Guide to Dub (2005, World Music Network)
