= Toasting (Jamaican music) =

Talking or chanting to an instrumental rhythm

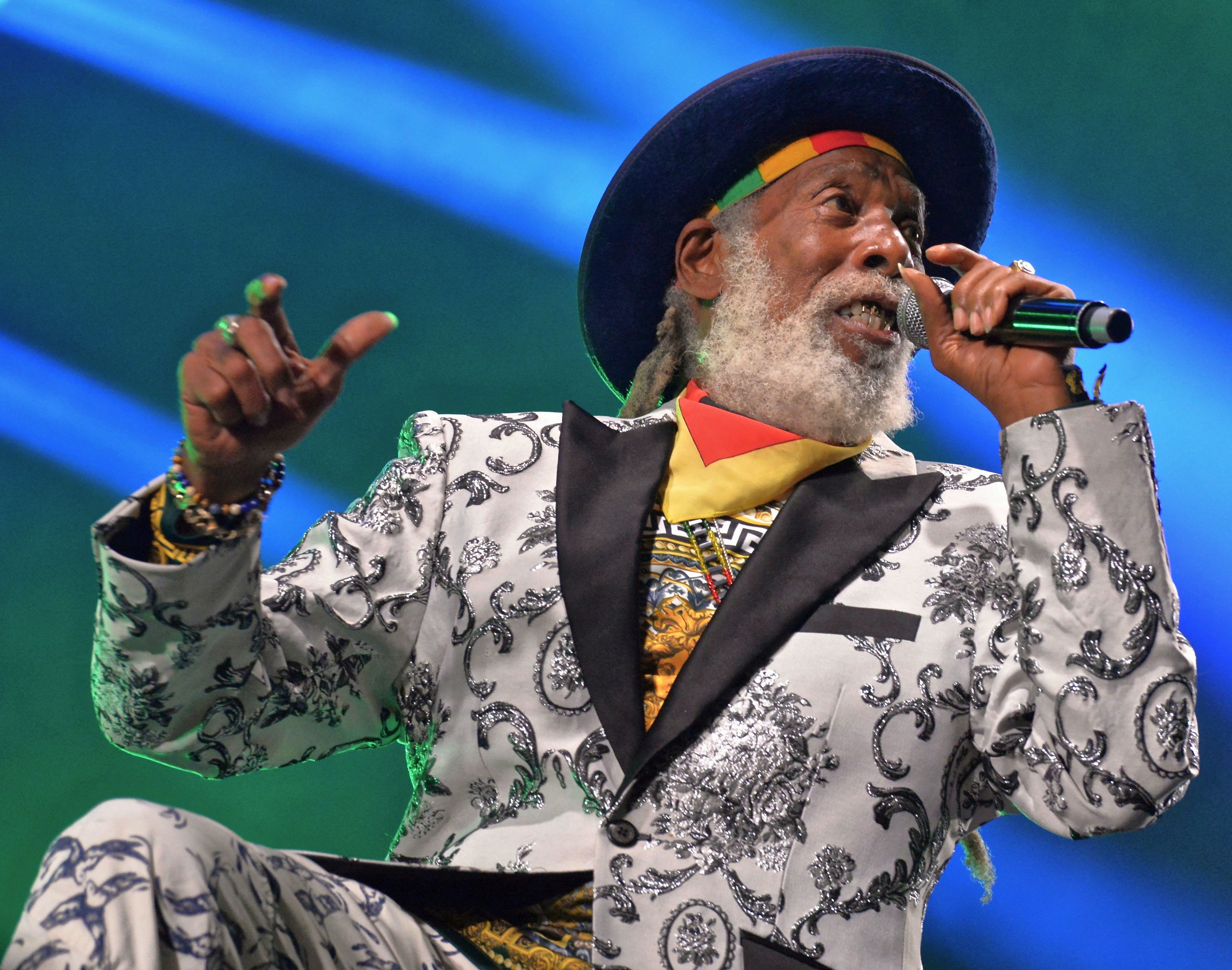
Big Youth is typical of reggae deejays who toast

Toasting (rap in other parts of the Anglo Caribbean) or deejaying is the act of talking, usually in a monotone melody, over a rhythm or beat by a deejay. It can either be improvised or pre-written. Toasting developed in Jamaica as part of the country's sound system culture before becoming widely known by that name. A similar sound is found in mento and now can be heard over musical styles including ska, reggae, dancehall, dub, grime, hip-hop, soca and bouyon music. The combination of singing and toasting is known as singjaying.

In the late 1950s in Jamaica,one of the first Selector, also being a promoter Matchuki speaks on how he originally used the mic exclusively to pull crowds to the lawns, announce upcoming dates, promote liquor sales, and market the exclusivity of the sound system's records. Count Matchuki. He conceived the idea for being comically entertaining from listening to commercial ads and radio stations etc. He would create and come up with comically phrases also doing African American jive before and during the music while selecting and playing R&B music.

Osbourne Ruddock (a.k.a. King Tubby) was a Jamaican sound recording engineer who created vocal-less rhythm backing tracks that were used by DJs doing toasting by creating one-off vinyl discs (also known as dub plates) of songs without the vocals and adding echo and sound effects.

In 1969, U-Roy, working with King Tubby's Hometown Hi-Fi sound system, toasted over instrumental dub plates made from existing rocksteady recordings. A customized version of The Techniques' "You Don't Care", combining a stripped-down rhythm with U-Roy's vocals, became Hometown Hi-Fi's signature tune. The popularity of such performances helped lead to the commercial recording of deejay music, and U-Roy's subsequent recordings became major Jamaican hits.

During the early 1970s, sound systems remained an important outlet for new Jamaican recordings, particularly music that received limited radio exposure. Producer Gussie Clarke recalled that deejays increasingly reflected the language and experiences of sound-system audiences, while competition between sound systems encouraged producers to develop rhythms suited to this style of performance. Other prominent toasting deejays of the period included Dennis Alcapone, I-Roy, Dillinger, Big Youth, and Prince Jazzbo. In the late 1970s, Trinity also rose to prominence.

In 1974, Bunny Lee organized a "Deejay Jamboree Night" at King Tubby's studio, inviting sound-system deejays who had not yet established recording careers to perform over rhythms, with those selected recording their performances. The session produced recordings by deejays including Ranking Joe, U Brown, and Tappa Zukie.

The 1980s saw the first deejay toasting duo, Michigan & Smiley, and the development of toasting outside of Jamaica. In England, Pato Banton explored his Caribbean roots, humorous and political toasting while Ranking Roger of the Second Wave or Two-Tone ska revival band The Beat from the 1980s did Jamaican toasting over music that blended ska, pop, and some punk influences.

Jamaican deejay toasting also influenced various types of dance music, such as jungle music and UK garage. Dancehall artists that have achieved pop hits with toasting-influenced vocals include Shabba Ranks, Shaggy, Lady Saw, Sean Paul, Terror Fabulous and Damian Marley.

== See also ==
- A cappella
- Beatbox
- Dancehall
- Deejay
- Doo-wop
- Onomatopoeia
- Scat singing
- Singjay
- Rapping
- Vocalese
- Voice instrumental music
