= List of rocksteady musicians =

This is a list of notable bands and musicians who performed primarily rocksteady music for a significant portion of their careers.

- Bobby Aitken
- Roland Alphonso
- Gladstone Anderson
- Bob Andy
- Ken Boothe
- The Cables
- Cornel Campbell
- Carlton and The Shoes
- Lloyd Charmers
- The Clarendonians
- Lord Creator
- Phyllis Dillon
- Dobby Dobson
- Errol Dunkley
- Clancy Eccles
- Alton Ellis
- The Ethiopians
- The Gaylads
- The Gladiators
- Winston Grennan
- Marcia Griffiths
- Derrick Harriott
- The Heptones
- Justin Hinds
- John Holt
- The Jamaicans
- Winston Jarrett
- Keith & Tex
- Pat Kelly
- Joya Landis
- Hopeton Lewis
- Mad Caddies
- David Madden
- Tommy McCook
- Freddie McKay
- The Melodians
- Jackie Mittoo
- Derrick Morgan
- The Paragons
- Ken Parker
- Dawn Penn
- Dwight Pinkney
- The Pioneers
- Prince Buster
- Ernest Ranglin
- Jimmy Riley
- Winston Riley
- B.B. Seaton
- Roy Shirley
- The Silvertones
- The Slackers
- Slim Smith
- Lynn Taitt
- The Techniques
- The Tennors
- U-Roy
- The Uniques
- The Wailers
- Delroy Wilson
