= Pat Kelly (musician) =

Jamaican musician (1944–2019)

- Born: Horatious Adolphus Kelly; 6 August 1944
- Origin: Kingston, Jamaica
- Died: 16 July 2019 (aged 74)
- Genres: Rocksteady, reggae, roots reggae, dub
- Occupations: Singer, producer, recording engineer, sound engineer
- Instrument: Vocals
- Years active: Mid-1960s–2019
- Formerly of: The Techniques

Horatious Adolphus "Pat" Kelly (6 August 1944 – 16 July 2019) was a prolific, influential Jamaican rocksteady and reggae singer and innovative, groundbreaking sound engineer working with King Tubby, Bunny Lee and Scientist (musician), whose career began in the mid-1960s. He recorded as a solo artist and as a member of the vocal group the Techniques. Slim Smith, who had been the lead vocalist in the band, left The Techniques in 1966 to be replaced by Pat Kelly. The shift from ska to rocksteady suited The Techniques, with a string of hits in 1967 and 1968 notably "You Don't Care" and "Queen Majesty", tunes which were versioned by Big Youth, Ken Parker (musician), Tony Tuff, Duke Reid, Tommy McCook, Sonia Pottinger's High Note label with The Revolutionaries, Ronnie Davis, The Itals, Cornell Campbell and many more

== Biography ==
=== The Techniques ===
Kelly was born in Kingston in 1944. After leaving school, he spent a year studying electronics in Springfield, Massachusetts, United States during 1966, gaining a degree in audio electronics from Massachusetts Institute of Technology, before returning to Jamaica. He initially recorded as a solo artist for his former schoolmate, producer Bunny Lee. In 1967, when Slim Smith left The Techniques, Kelly was brought in to replace him, recording for Duke Reid in the Rocksteady era when Reid's Treasure Isle studio/label was dominating Jamaican music. Kelly's falsetto voice, strongly influenced by the American soul singer Sam Cooke, in combination with Winston Riley and Bruce Ruffin, maintained the success that The Techniques had enjoyed with Smith. The Techniques first record with Kelly, "You Don't Care" ( which was adapted from The Impressions Curtis Mayfield tune, "You'll Want Me Back" ) spent six weeks at number one in the Jamaican singles chart, and was followed by further hits such as "I'm in the Mood For Love", a song Kelly recorded with The Techniques in 1966, and revisited a number of times throughout his career. In the late 1970s, Kelly recorded a High Note label vocal and dub Discomix of "I'm in the Mood For Love" for Sonia Pottinger, followed by a slower, more spacious Winston Riley produced take on the same tune with MC Toaster Prince Mohammed, AKA George Nooks and released on the Techniques label."You Don't Care" was versioned again in the late 70s by Kelly, this time with The Revolutionaries and Ranking Trevor on Sonia Pottinger’s label, then also dubbed once more on Big Youth's Klik Records release Dreadlocks Dread album in 1975.

=== Solo career ===
In 1968, Kelly went solo again, working again with Lee, and recording another Mayfield cover, "Little Boy Blue". He also recorded for Phil Pratt. Kelly's How Long Will It Take 45 was the biggest-selling Jamaican single of 1969, and was the first Jamaican record to feature a string arrangement, which was overdubbed when it was released in the United Kingdom on the Palmer Brothers' Gas label. In the same year, Kelly also recorded a Bunny Lee produced version of the John D. Loudermilk composition, Then You Can Tell Me Goodbye, a tune already popularised in Jamaica by the Bettye Swann and Johnny Nash interpretations. 1969 was a prolific year, with Kelly also interpreting the James Carr (singer) Soul music R & B tune, The Dark End of the Street, with Bunny 'Striker' Lee and Lee "Scratch" Perry on production duties. In 1976, Pat Kelly teamed up with Yabby You and The Prophets to cut a Rockers discomix version of the How Long Will It Take tune, backed by The Revolutionaries. An album followed, the Lee "Scratch" Perry-engineered Pat Kelley Sings (sic), and Kelly was offered a £25,000 contract by Apple Records, which he was unable to accept due to existing contractual commitments.

Kelly continued to record, having a big hits for producer Phil Pratt in 1972 with "Soulful Love" and "Talk About Love", and returning to record with Duke Reid, having another hit with a cover of John Denver's "Sunshine On My Shoulders". In 1977, Pat Kelly cut a Rockers discomix version of "Talk about Love" with Dillinger and The Revolutionaries, and in the same period, he also revisited "Sunshine" with The Revolutionaries, updated to the more spacious and experimental drum and bass heavy styles of the time. Kelly's composition "Talk about Love" has proved consistently popular, notably with versions produced by vocalist Al Campbell recorded at Channel One Studios in 1991.

In 1979, Kelly worked with Sly and Robbie, Ossie Hibbert and Ranking Trevor on the Rockers vocal and dub Discomix, "It's a Good Day", which was also versioned by King Tubby. As well as pursuing his calling as a vocalist, Pat Kelly also made use of his earlier training, working as a highly prolific sound engineer at several Jamaican studios including Channel One and King Tubby's, where he worked with Scientist (musician) on vocals and dubs with the leading musicians of the period.

Kelly also moved into production, producing his own Youth and Youth album in 1978, and co-producing (with Holt) John Holt's The Impressable John Holt (Disco Mix) album in 1979. In 1978 ( a year before the release of the album of the same name ) Kelly also released a spacious discomix rockers’ version of the tune “So Proud,” on both the Burning Rockers and Chanan-Jah labels to significant acclaim, backed by a more pared down, sparser, percussive tune entitled “Soulful love”. “I'm So Proud (song)” was a song originally written by Curtis Mayfield and recorded by the Impressions in 1963 for their R&B album The Never Ending Impressions.

Throughout the 1970s, Pat Kelly was the sound engineer for the iconic Aggrovators & The Revolutionaries album Rockers Almighty Dub, “God Son” Glen Brown’s On the Way to Mount Zion, also featuring on Dr. Alimantado’s Best Dressed Chicken in Town,Johnny Clarke’s Rockers Time Now and Ruffer Version (Johnny Clarke at King Tubby's 74-78), Pablo Moses’s Revolutionary Dream,Beres Hammond’s I'm Just A Man, Jah Woosh’s Dreadlocks Affair, Errol Holt ’s Vision Of Africa, as well as producing works for Prince Far-I.

The late 1970s and early 1980s saw Kelly recording more regularly again, and he continued to record occasionally in the years that followed.

In 1991, he recorded a remake of 'Broken Homes' titled 'Broken City' under Shelly's Records Label, using the Pounder Riddim, which would later contribute to the emergence of the genre known as reggaeton."

In the 1990s he was a member of a reformed Techniques, along with Lloyd Parks and Johnny Johnson. He continued to perform internationally up to 2018.

Kelly died on 16 July 2019, aged 74, from complications of kidney disease. He was survived by widow Ingrid, one son (Shawn) and four daughters (Cheryl, Pamela, Padeane, & Terri-Ann). He is buried at Dovecot Memorial Park & Crematorium in St. Catherine.

== Discography ==
=== Studio albums ===
- Pat Kelley Sings (1969), Pama
- Give Love a Try (1978), Third World
- Youth and Youth (1978), Live & Love
- Lonely Man (1978), Burning Sounds
- Lovers Rock (1979), Third World (with Johnny Clarke and Hortense Ellis)
- One Man Stand (1979), Third World/Puff
- So Proud (1979), Burning Rockers/Chanan-Jah
- Cool Breezing (197?), Sunshot
- Wish It Would Rain (1980), Joe Gibbs
- From Both Sides (1980), Ita
- Sunshine (1980), KG Imperial
- Srevol (1983), Ethnic Fight UK
- Pat Kelly and Friends (1984), Chanan-Jah
- One In a Million (1984), Sky Note
- Ordinary Man (1987), Body Music
- Cry For You No More (1988), Blue Moon
- Try To Remember (1991), Shelly's Records, NYC
- No Further Fears (2009), Tad's Record
- Are You For Real (with Los Aggrotones) (2012), Interrogator Records
- Love Songs (Jackpot, KGLP003).

=== Compilation albums ===
- The Best of Pat Kelly (1983), Vista Sounds
- Butterflies, Sonic Sounds
- Classic Hits of Pat Kelly (1995), Rhino
- Classics (199?), Super Power
- Soulful Love - The Best Of (1997), Trojan (Pat Kelly & Friends)
- The Vintage Series (2000), VP
- Sings Classical Hits Galore, Striker Lee
