= The Cables =

Jamaican rocksteady/reggae group

- Origin: Kingston
- Genres: Rocksteady, reggae
- Years active: early 1960s – present (intermittently)
- Labels: Studio One, Harry J
- Past members: Keble Drummond; Elbert Stewart; Vince Stoddart

The Cables are a Jamaican rocksteady/reggae vocal trio led by Keble Drummond, who recorded for Studio One in the late 1960s.

== History ==
The group was led by Keble Drummond (sometimes spelled Keeble), whose first name led to the name of the group. Drummond explained "Now, I look at something with a cable and wires, and I say, well, 'Cables' would be a good name because you could send a message across the world, and that's how I came up with the name". He was backed by harmony singers Elbert Stewart (baritone) and Vince Stoddart (tenor). Drummond was taught the basics of guitar by Peter Austin of The Clarendonians and write his first songs after attending a songwriting course. Drummond had previously been a member of The Sylastians, along with Barry Llewellyn and Earl Morgan of The Heptones, and Clive Campbell of The Aces, and the Cables were first formed in 1962. After recording a single for Sonia Pottinger around 1966, they recorded a string of singles for Studio One, and these were later collected on the album What Kind of World in 1970. What Kind of World has been described as "a classic...a low-key showcase for some of the most under-rated vocals of the age". Studio One boss Clement "Coxsone" Dodd built up demand for the "Baby Why" single by limiting it to sound system plays for four months before releasing it. The rhythm tracks were later employed by Dodd on several tracks by other artists. Unsatisfied with the lack of money received from Dodd, The Cables recorded for Harry J while they were still under contract to Studio One, with Drummond altering his voice and the single released under the name "Herbie Carter" (a real singer who recorded for Harry J) to avoid Dodd finding out. By 1970, The Cables had left Studio One. "(Everybody) Feel Alright" was entered into the Festival Song Contest in 1971, losing out to Eric Donaldson's "Cherry Oh Baby". They recorded a few more singles for producers such as J.J. Johnson, Harry J, and Bunny Lee ("Come On", recorded with Slim Smith), but failed to repeat their Studio One success. Drummond left the group to embark on an unsuccessful solo career in 1972, and briefly formed a new group, True Experience, with Trevor Shields and Bobby Ellis, releasing "My Girl" in 1974.

"Baby Why" formed the basis of deejay tracks from both Dennis Alcapone and Prince Jazzbo, and the rhythm was used by The Gladiators for their 1974 track "Rearrange".

A second album, Baby Why, produced by Harry J, was recorded in 1977, where they were backed by musicians from The in Crowd and Third World.

The Cables have reformed several times in the years that followed. Drummond earned a living working in a shoe factory during The Cables' peak and moved to the United States in 1979, later working for American Airlines.

A third album, also titles Baby Why and credited to "Cables and friends" was issued in 1993, and led to The Cables performing at the 1994 Reggae Sunsplash festival.

The three original members, along with tenor Owen "Bobby" Dockery, reunited in 2011 to perform at the Sierra Nevada World Music Festival in California.

Drummond released a solo album, Mellow Moods of Music, in August 2013.

== Discography ==
=== Albums ===
- What Kind of World (1970) Studio One
- Baby Why (1977) Harry J
- Baby Why (2002) VP (Cables and friends)

Keble Drummond

- Mellow Moods of Music (2013)

=== Singles ===
The Cables

- "Happy End" SEP
- "I've Made Up My Mind" aka "Good Luck to You" (1966) Gay Disc
- "You Betrayed Me" (1967) SEP
- "What Kind of World" (1968) Studio One/Coxsone
- "Baby Why" (1968) Studio One
- "Love Is a Pleasure" (1968) Studio One
- "Cheer Up" (1968) Studio One
- "So Long" (1969) Bamboo
- "Got to Find Someone" (1969) Studio One
- "Happy Time" (1969) Harry J (credited to Herbie Carter)
- "How Can I Trust You" (1970) Studio One/Bamboo
- "Didn't I" (1970) Harry J
- "Feel All Right" (1970) Harry J
- "Salt of the Earth" (1970) Harry J
- "Come On" (1970) Jackpot
- "A Sometime Girl" (1971) Big Shot/Electro
- "Mixing" (1971) Electro
- "Be Wise" (1971) Panther
- "Everybody's Got a Song to Sing" (1976) Trojan/Horse
- "Jamaica" Afrik (1977)
- "I've Got to Go Back Home" Harry J
- "Baby I Love You" (197?) World Wide/Money Disc
- "Fast Mouth" Gaydisc
- "How Do You Think I Feel?" Gaydisc
- "Rich Man Poor Man" Dynamic
- "Too Much Talking" Bright Star

Keble Drummond

- "Dangerous" (1972) Mud/Pama (b-side of the Phil Pratt All Stars' "Feel Good All Over")
- "Your Pretty Face" (1973) Jackpot
- "Praise Jah" (1976) Mummy
- "Keep on Dancing" Mummy
- "Imagine Now" Starlight
- "The Twinkle is Gone" Harry J (credited to "Eric Fater")
- "If Only Love Could Last"

Keble Drummond and The Cables

- "Poor People" High Note
- "What Kind of World" (1977) Island/Black Swan
