= Phil Pratt =

Jamaican musician

Phil Pratt, born George Phillips (born 1942 in Kingston, Jamaica) is a Jamaican reggae singer and record producer.

== Career ==
Phil Pratt worked at Studio One for Coxsone Dodd as a box-loader during the rocksteady period when Lee Perry was operating there, before moving to the United Kingdom in the early 1960s. Pratt returned to Jamaica in 1965, and as a singer, he recorded in 1967 a song called "Safe Travel" together with Hemsley Morris released on his own Wiggle Spoon label. He moved to Ken Lack's label Caltone and recorded a few tunes there. In 1966, Pratt decided to get into production and while at Caltone recorded the young Horace Andy. During the rocksteady period, he recorded singers such as Ken Boothe, John Holt and Pat Kelly, backed by session men such as Lynn Taitt, his productions appearing on the Caltone, Wiggle Spoon and WIRL labels before he launched his own label, Jon Tom.

Throughout the 1970s, Pratt enjoyed successes with Ken Boothe ("Artibella", "I'm Not For Sale"), Al Campbell, Delroy Wilson, Bobby Kalphat, and Keith Poppin, and had a major hit with "My Heart Is Gone" by John Holt, Dennis Brown's "Let Love In" and "Black Magic Woman", and Pat Kelly's "How Long", "Soulful Love" and "They Talk About Love". More particularly, from 1971 to 1975 Pratt produced many DJs including Dennis Alcapone ("This Is Butter"), Dillinger ("Platt Skank"), I-Roy ("My Food Is Ration") or U Roy ("Real Cool") and Jah Woosh ("Psalm 21" and "Zion Sound"), but he remains mostly known for the singles he recorded in 1972 with Big Youth (among his earliest songs), "Tell It Black" and "Phil Pratt Thing".

Pratt mainly recorded in the Channel One Studios, working with the musicians who would later be called The Revolutionaries but also teamed with Lee Perry again, at Black Ark Studios producing among others Linval Thompson's first single. Pratt set up his own label Terminal in London in order to release his productions worldwide. He moved to London by the beginning of the 1980s and opened a restaurant there.

In 1985, he produced the Clash of the Andy's album, featuring Horace Andy and Patrick Andy.

== Discography ==
- Phil Pratt – Star Wars Dub – 1978 – Burning Sounds
- Various Artists – The Magnificent Seven – 1978 – Burning Music
- Various Artists – Hits of the Past – Sun Shot (1994)
- Various Artists – Raw Roots volume 1 – 1970–75 – Jet Set Records (1998)
- Various Artists – Raw Roots volume 2 – 1971–78 – Jet Set Records (1998)
- Various Artists – The Best of Sunshot – 1971–75 – Jet Set Records (1998)
- Various Artists – Phil Pratt Thing – Pressure Sounds (1999)
- Various Artists – Safe Travel – 1966–68 – Pressure Sounds (2005)
- Phil Pratt – Star Wars Dub – 2020 (Repress in Red Vinyl) – Burning Sounds
