= Ken Lack =

- Also known as: BJ Kalnek
- Born: Blondel Keith Calnek; 1934
- Died: June 6, 2001 (aged 66–67)
- Genres: Ska, rocksteady, reggae
- Occupation: Record producer
- Years active: 1960s
- Labels: Caltone, JonTom

Ken Lack (born Blondel Keith Calnek, 1934, died June 6, 2001, Miami) was a Jamaican ska, rocksteady and reggae record producer active in the latter half of the 1960s, who also ran the Caltone and JonTom record labels.

== Career ==
Lack was for a short time the road manager for The Skatalites, working alongside P.J. Patterson, and began releasing records in the mid 1960s including one of the last tunes recorded by the Skatalites, "Outer Space", and others by Ken Boothe, The Clarendonians, The Tartans, The Heptones, The Pioneers, The Slickers, Roy Shirley & Slim Smith.as well as several instrumental singles featuring bands led by Tommy McCook or Lynn Taitt, and featuring soloists such as Johnny "Dizzy" Moore and Vin Gordon. Lack's JonTom record label was named after Johnny Moore and Tommy McCook.

Bunny Lee worked for Lack in the early days of Caltone, and Lee's first production, "Listen to The Beat" by Lloyd Jackson and The Groovers was released on Lack's Caltone label in 1967. Max Romeo also got his big break working for Lack as a record plugger, with Lack setting up an audition for Romeo's group The Emotions after overhearing him singing while at work, and going on to release a string of hit singles by the group.

Lack was the first producer to work with some of Jamaica's major stars including Hortense Ellis ("I Shall Sing" and "Brown Girl In The Ring"), The Heptones (releasing their first two singles, "School Girls" and "Gunmen Coming to Town", the latter taking its melody from Rossini's William Tell Overture), and The Uniques with their debut single "The Journey".

Lack's career as a producer ended when he emigrated to the United States in the late 1960s.

He died on June 6, 2001, after a long illness related to heart problems.
