= Jimmy Riley =

Jamaican singer (1947–2016)

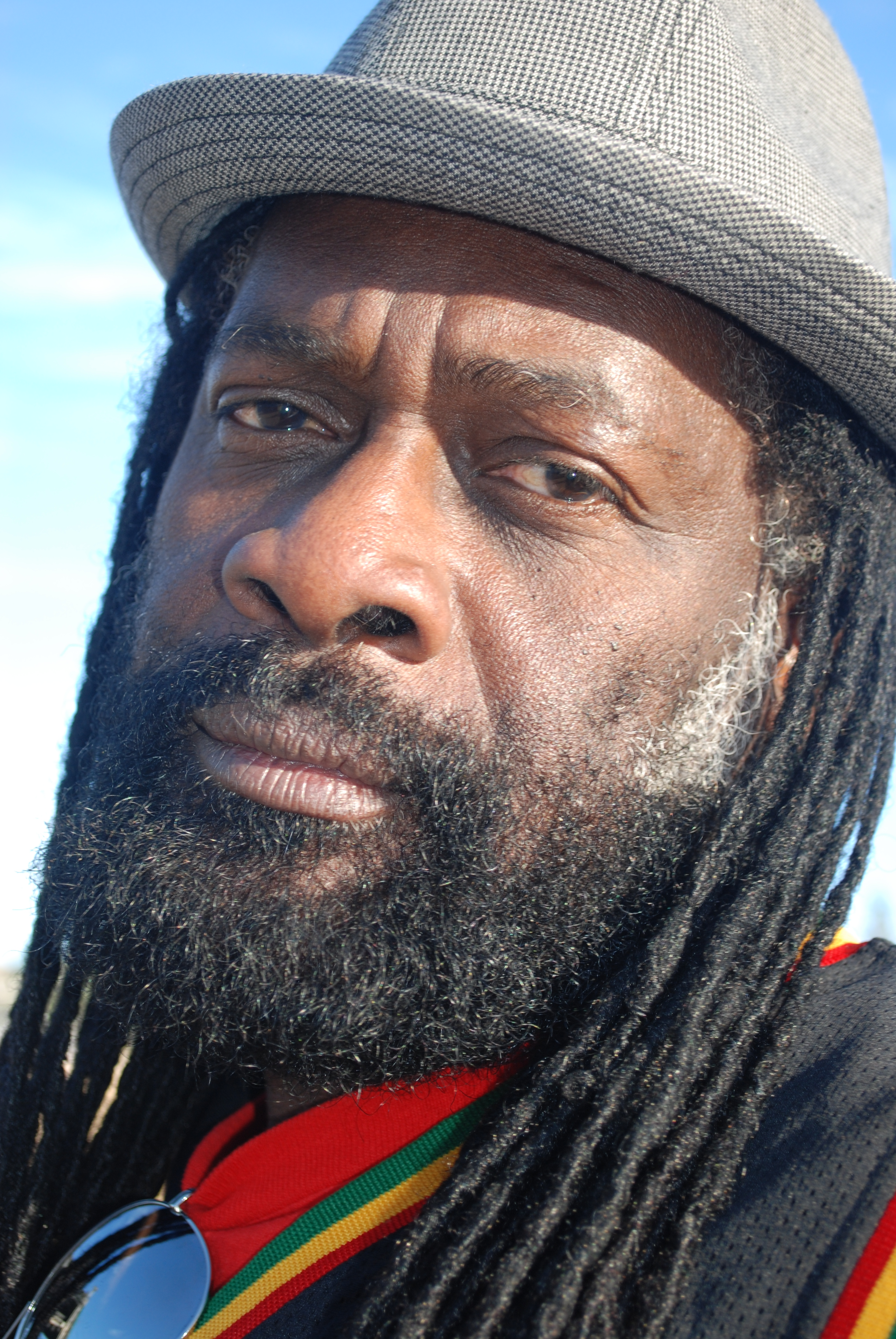
- Riley pictured in 2010

Background information
- Born: Martin James Norman Riley; 22 May 1947
- Origin: Kingston, Jamaica
- Died: 23 March 2016 (aged 68) New York City, United States
- Genres: Ska, rocksteady, reggae
- Occupations: Singer, record producer
- Years active: Mid-1960s–2016

Martin James Ziggy Norman Riley (22 May 1947 – 23 March 2016), better known as Jimmy Riley, was a Jamaican singer who in addition to recording solo was also a member of the Sensations and The Uniques and was the father of Tarrus Riley.

== Biography ==
Martin James Ziggy Norman Riley, also known as Jimmy Riley, was born in Jonestown, Kingston, Jamaica, on 22 May 1947 to Leanora Riley and Alfred Riley. Riley grew up in the city's Waterhouse district and attended Kingston Senior School along with Slim Smith. When Smith had success in The Techniques, Riley hung around with the group hoping to join, but was limited to carrying things for them and helping out with harmonies. He decided to form his own group, The Sensations, along with Cornell Campbell, Buster Riley (brother of The Techniques' Winston Riley), and Aaron "Dego" Davis. The Sensations had a successful audition for producer Arthur "Duke" Reid, and the group had mid-1960s success with "Everyday is Just a Holiday" and "Those Guys". On leaving the group in 1967, Riley joined Smith and Lloyd Charmers in the re-formed Uniques, having huge success with songs such as "Watch This Sound" and "My Conversation".

When the Uniques split up, Riley initially recorded as a solo artist for Bunny Lee before moving away to record independently. He began producing his own recordings and others by artists such as Slim Smith and Delroy Wilson. He had several hits in the 1970s, including "Tell The Youths The Truth", "Nyah Bingi", and "Clean up the Streets", and continued to be successful in the 1980s, working with Sly & Robbie's Taxi productions. In 1983, Riley topped the UK reggae chart with his version of Marvin Gaye's "Sexual Healing". In the late 1980s, Riley moved to Miami, and put his career on hold, but returned to Jamaica in the early 1990s.

Riley's son Tarrus followed him into music and the success of Tarrus gave a boost to Jimmy's career. They performed together several times, headlining a number of festivals including the Ocho Rios Seafood Festival in 2007. Jimmy Riley's album release in 2008 Sly and Robbie Presents Jimmy Riley: Pull Up Selector saw him again working with Sly & Robbie, and features Tarrus on the title track, which was also released as a single in 2008.

In September 2013, he released the album Contradiction, that featured guest appearances from his son Tarrus, Sizzla, and Fantan Mojah.

He died on the morning of 23 March 2016 in New York from cancer, aged 68.

== Discography ==
- Tell The Youths The Truth (1978), Trojan
- Majority Rule (1978), Burning Sounds
- Makossa International Records Presents Jimmy Riley (1978), Makossa International
- The Jimmy Riley Showcase (1978), Burning Sounds/Yes/Makossa International
- Rydim Driven (1981), Taxi aka Love & Devotion (2000), Rhino
- Put The People First (1982), Shanachie
- Magic (1984), Imp
- World for Everyone (1985)
- Love Fa Real (1995),
- Attention (1996), Abraham
- Rock On (1998), Charm
- Someone Like You (1998), Nyam Up
- Love Canticle (2000), Charm
- Jimmy Riley Now (2001), Jet Star
- Sly and Robbie Presents Jimmy Riley: Pull Up Selector (2009), Taxi
- Contradiction (2013) VP

Compilations

- 20 Classic Hits (1993), Sonic Sounds
- Live It To Know It (2015), Self productions, Protest Songs & Dub Plates 1975 – 1985: Pressure Sounds
