= Ernest Wilson (singer) =

Jamaican reggae singer (1951–2021)

- Born: Fitzroy Ernest Wilson; 18 November 1951; Clarendon Parish, Jamaica
- Died: 2 November 2021 (aged 69) Kingston, Jamaica
- Genres: Reggae
- Instrument: Vocals

Fitzroy Ernest Wilson (18 November 1951 – 2 November 2021) was a Jamaican reggae singer who found fame as a member of the Clarendonians before working as a solo artist.

== Biography ==
Wilson formed the Clarendonians in 1963 with Peter Austin, the duo going on to become one of the most popular groups of the ska and rocksteady era, and having several Jamaican number one hits. Wilson embarked on a solo career in 1967, releasing the "Money Worries" single. Further singles followed, with "Undying Love", "Storybook Children" and "If I Were a Carpenter" in 1968 (all produced by Coxsone Dodd), "Private Number" (for Joe Gibbs) and "Freedom Train" (for Lee "Scratch" Perry - one of the first Jamaican singles ever to be released in stereo) in 1969. In 1969, he got back together with sometime Clarendonian Freddie McGregor in the duo 'Ernest Wilson & Freddy', releasing the singles "Sentimental Man" and "Love Makes the World Go Round", and later "What You Gonna Do About It" and "Let Them Talk". One of Wilson's biggest international hit singles, "Let True Love Be", (1976), was done alongside Harold Butler & Four Corners. It was featured on Butler's 1978 album, The Butler Did It. Wilson was also briefly a member of The Techniques. In 1977 Ernest Wilson, backed by The Revolutionaries at Channel One Studios, recorded conscious sound system favourite "I Know Myself", popular with Jah Shaka and Lloyd Coxsone sound systems in the UK. The song was later reworked in the early 1990s as a Drum and Bass Jungle Music Discomix Dubplate by The Family of Intelligence and The Kemet Crew, later released on their Champion Jungle Sound album.

He contributed backing vocals to tracks by Beres Hammond, Inner Circle, Jimmy Reid, Jimmy Riley, Johnny Osbourne and Kiddus I. He was also a multi-instrumentalist, having played piano on the Umoja album as part of the DEB Music Players, bass guitar on Gregory Isaacs' Cool Ruler album, and guitar on several recordings including tracks by Tinga Stewart and Kiddus I.

Wilson died in Kingston on 2 November 2021, at the age of 69.

== Albums ==
- Love Revolution (1986) Natty Congo
- Promise Me (1987) Techniques
- Undying Love (1992) VP
- Still Love You (2007) Love Injection
