= Sarge (album) =

Studio album by Delroy Wilson
- Released: 1976
- Recorded: Federal Studios (Kingston, JA) & Coach House (London, UK), 1976
- Genre: Reggae
- Label: LTD/Charmers
- Producer: Lloyd Charmers

Delroy Wilson chronology
For I and I (1975)	Sarge (1976)	Mr. Cool Operator (1977)

Sarge is a 1976 album by Delroy Wilson, originally released on the LTD label in Jamaica and the Charmers label in the UK. The album was produced and arranged by Lloyd Charmers, and featured the biggest selling reggae single of 1976, Wilson's cover version of Bob Marley's "I'm Still Waiting". The single's success led to a similarly themed album, with Wilson singing versions of well-known songs over Charmers' arrangements, including covers of Slim Smith's "My Conversation", Simon and Garfunkel's "My Cecilia" and Tom Paxton's "Too Late for the Learning". Sarge was chosen as one of 100 "essential reggae CDs" by Rough Guides and is widely regarded as Wilson's best album.

The album was re-issued in 1986 on Trojan Records.

== Track listing ==
1. "I'm Still Waiting"
2. "My Conversation"
3. "Moving Away"
4. "I Don't Want To See You Cry"
5. "My Cecelia"
6. "Ain't That Loving You"
7. "Got A Date"
8. "Every Body Needs Love"
9. "Green Green Grass Of Home"
10. "Too Late For The Learning"

== Personnel ==
- Vocals: Delroy Wilson
- Drums: Derrick Stewart, Mikey "Boo" Richards
- Bass guitar: Val Douglas
- Brass: Roots Casanovas
- Guitar: Willie Lindo
- Keyboards: Lloyd Charmers, Harold Butler
- Backing vocals: The Charmers
- Special Effects: Lloyd Charmers
- Producer: Lloyd Charmers
- Engineer: George Raymond & Frank Aggarat
