= Trenchtown =

Trench Town
- Residential neighbourhood
- Trenchtown
- Location within Jamaica
- Coordinates: 17°59′06″N 76°47′48″W
- Country: Jamaica
- Parish: St Andrew
- City: Kingston
- Postal code: Kingston 12

Trench Town (also Trenchtown) is a neighbourhood located in the parish of St. Andrew, part of which is in Kingston, the capital and largest city of Jamaica. Today Trench Town is the location of the Trench Town Culture Yard Museum, a National Heritage Site presenting the unique history and contribution of Trench Town to Jamaica.

Trench Town is the birthplace of rocksteady and reggae music, as well as the home of reggae and Rastafari ambassador Bob Marley. The neighborhood gets its name from its previous designation as Trench Pen, 400 acres (162 hectares) of land once used for livestock by Daniel Power Trench, an Irish immigrant of the 18th century (descendants of the Earls of Clancarty). The Trench family abandoned the land in the late 19th century. Trench Town is home to the communities of Wilton Gardens [Rema], Federal Gardens, Arnett Gardens [Jungle], Havana, Buckers and others. Trench Town today is also the home of two of Jamaica's top Premier League football club teams, Arnett Gardens and Boys' Town.

== History ==
During the colonial period, Trenchtown was part of the Greenwich Park estate of Daniel Power Trench (1813-1884), son of a wealthy plantation owner and slave-holder. Christopher Whyms-Stone asserts the settlement's name derives from Daniel Trench (rather than, for instance, taking its name from gulleys and trenches observable in its landscape).

During the 1930s, Trench Pen, in southern St. Andrew (neighboring western Kingston), was a growing squatter settlement for the rural to urban migrants. Trench Pen was developed into Trench Town when the colonial government's Central Housing Authority (CHA) initiated a model township project, which included owner-occupied housing, rental social housing, schools, a theatre (The Ambassador), a park (Vin Lawrence Park), YMCA and YWCA, health clinic and fire station. Approximately 200 acres (81 hectares) of Trench Pen was used to create Trench Town, and the remaining land became known as Rose Town, a residential community. Many who came from rural Jamaica to find work settled in the western side of Kingston, as there were available "idle" lands, and the area was also a desirable location since it close to downtown and the market district.

The new residences consisted of one- and two-storey 'knog' buildings, built in clusters or around a central courtyard with communal cooking and bathroom facilities. The residences became the famous Government Yards of Trench Town. Knog construction refers to a labor-intensive traditional method of construction where a timber-frame structure is in-filled with brick or rubble then covered with a wire mesh and plastered. The architecture used was that of a rural Caribbean vernacular with hip roofs and wide verandas. Trench Town was a planned community with a hierarchical grid of streets and central sewage and garbage disposal systems. In the 1950s and 1960s, bread and milk were delivered door to door. Each month the CHA would inspect the residences to ensure compliance and that tenants paid their twelve shillings per month on time.

Trench then became famous for the talent which emerged from the project. Trench Town is mainly known for the vast number of musicians it produced, the community has also produced some of Jamaica's top professional, business and political leaders as well as famous sports and religious personalities. This small area contributed widely to global awareness of the impoverished and politically-corrupt conditions in Jamaica.

Like the rest of Jamaica, Trench Town became unstable and dangerous in the early 1970s when politics became violent. The two major Jamaican political parties (the People's National Party and the Jamaica Labour Party) had emerged in Kingston and violently enforced codes that ensured only their party's supporters had access to jobs and services. The lower part of Trench Town below Seventh Street was sympathetic to the JLP, which in the 1970s put it at war with its northern neighbor Arnette Gardens, a PNP stronghold. The road connecting the two, Seventh Street, became the frontline in an all-out war, which saw the entire two blocks of Government Yards between Fifth Street and Seventh Streets being destroyed. The greatest challenge of the community and Jamaica today is poverty.

Traditional community organizations such as Boys Town [YMCA] and Joy Town [YWCA] continue to contribute to the welfare of the residents. New organizations such as AIR (Agency for Inner-city Renewal), the Trenchtown Reading Centre [FACE Jamaica], and the Trench Town Development Association, were formed to increase positive social attitudes, increase literacy and encourage government spending and development in the area. Crime in the neighbourhood has declined; the murder rate in western Kingston has dropped since the mid-1990s. King Charles III has funded a regeneration project in Rose Town through his Foundation for Building Community.

=== Birthplace of reggae ===
Trench Town is known in popular culture due to numerous ska, rocksteady, and reggae musicians who grew up there, most notably Bob Marley, who spent much of his youth in the Government Yard on First Street. His songs "Trenchtown", "Natty Dread", "Trenchtown Rock" and "No Woman, No Cry" make reference to it. It was also home to Rastafari elder Mortimo "Kumi" Planno, and the following artists and groups:

- The Abyssinians
- Wailing Souls
- The Paragons
- The Techniques
- Toots & the Maytals
- Dean Fraser
- Ernest Ranglin
- Alton Ellis
- Hortense Ellis
- Winston "Flames" Jarrett
- Delroy Wilson
- Joe Higgs
- Adina Edwards
- Junior Braithwaite
- Lord Tanamo
- Stranger Cole
- Cynthia Schloss
- Lascelles Perkins
- Dobby Dobson
- Noel "Scully" Simms
- the Folkes Brothers
- Wilfred "Jackie" Edwards
- Leroy Sibbles
- Bongo Herman
- Roy Shirley
- Massive Dread
- Anthony Johnson
- Peter Tosh
- Bunny Wailer
- Mighty Diamonds

== Main sights ==
- Trench Town Culture Yard Museum
- Trenchtown Reading Centre
- Vin Lawrence Park (locally called simply 'the park')
- Trench Town Peace and Justice Centre

== Education ==
- Trench Town Primary School
- Boys Town Learning Institution
- Trench Town Polytechnic College, Formerly Trench Town High School
- Iris Gelly Primary
- Charlie Smith High School
- Jones Town Primary

== Notable people ==
- Theophilus Beckford ( 1935 – 2001), foundation artist, pianist, and one of the pioneers of Jamaican popular music during the transition from rhythm 'n' blues to Jamaican ska
- DJ Kool Herc (Clive Campbell), DJ and rapper
- Alton Ellis, rocksteady singer and recording artist
- Hortense Ellis, reggae artist
- Dean Fraser, saxophonist and recording artist
- Joe Higgs, reggae musician and recording artist
- Knowledge (Anthony Doyley, Michael Smith, Delroy Fowlin, Michael Samuels, Earl MacFarlane, Paul Freeman, Magnus Skeen)
- Bob Marley, reggae singer, songwriter, guitarist, and recording artist
- Massive Dread (Dennis James), reggae deejay
- Mortimer Planno, Rastafari elder
- Ernest Ranglin, composer, guitarist, and recording artist
- Roy Shirley, ska, rocksteady singer, whose "Hold Them" is regarded as the first ever rocksteady song
- Collie Smith, West Indian cricketer
- Peter Tosh (Winston Hubert McIntosh) OM, reggae singer, guitarist, percussionist, recording artist
- Bunny Wailer (Neville O'Riley Livingston), reggae singer, songwriter, percussionist, and recording artist
- Delroy Wilson, ska, rocksteady, and reggae singer and recording artist
