= Tinga Stewart =

Jamaican reggae singer

- Born: Neville Stewart
- Origin: Kingston, Jamaica
- Genres: Reggae
- Instrument: Vocals

Tinga Stewart (born Neville Stewart, c. 3 July 1950, Kingston, Jamaica) is a Jamaican reggae singer. Stewart won the Festival Song Contest three times, twice as a singer and once as a songwriter.

== Biography ==
Stewart's career began in the late 1960s, his first single being 1969's "She's Gone", with Ernest Wilson of The Clarendonians. He worked with producer Derrick Harriott in the early 1970s, with releases such as "Hear That Train", and performed on the PNP bandwagon in 1971, in support of Michael Manley's election campaign. He sang with The Wildcats, Byron Lee & the Dragonaires, and The Boris Gardiner Happening, then went solo and had a local hit in 1973 with "Funny Feeling", and won the 1974 Festival Song Contest with Ernie Smith's "Play de Music", which went on to become a hit in both the Jamaican chart and the United Kingdom reggae chart. The following year, Tinga wrote "Hooray Festival" with Willie Lindo, the entry sung by his brother Roman Stewart, which also won. This success led to releases in the UK on the Opal label, but the brothers' festival success hampered their early careers, with them being regarded as 'festival singers', and Tinga stated in 2012 "I almost lost my career to Festival. People were characterising me as a Festival song singer once. I couldn't get any shows because of my involvement. It took me 15 albums to fully win back my fan base." Tinga was involved in the mid to late 1970s with the Wildflower project, with Lloyd Charmers and Ernie Smith, and worked extensively on the Jamaican hotel circuit, but his career began to take off again in the late 1970s, with singles recorded at Channel One Studios, including "Dry Up Your Tears" and "Rainy Night in Georgia", and winning the Festival Song Contest again in 1981 with "Nuh Wey Nuh Better Dan Yard", and the same year being voted the most popular reggae artist in Jamaica. Two albums followed on John Carroll's Calabash label. Singles such as "Gypsy Rasta", "Key To Your Heart", and a version of "Red Red Wine", were followed by what is often considered the first genuine combination single, "Take Time To Know" recorded with the deejay Ninjaman. The combination singles continued with "Knock Out Batty" (with Tinga Love) and "I Wanna Take You Home" (with Little Twitch), with the album Tinga Stewart with the Dancehall DJs following. Stewart took part in the Reggae Sunsplash world tour in 1989, touring Japan. He continued to record in the 1990s and 2000s, having now released over 200 singles, and has toured the United States, Canada, Japan, England, and Africa, as well as working as a producer.

== Albums ==
- I Feel The Music (1981) Calabash
- Key to Your Heart (1984) Calabash/Londisc
- Respect Me (1989)
- With the Dancehall DJs (1993) RAS
- Aware of Love (1994) VP
- No Drugs (1988) Jammy's
- Without Love (1998) Rhino
- Under Your Spell Hopekatina
- From the Archives
- Ninja & Tinga alongside the Dancehall Greats
- Brother to Brother with Roman Stewart
- Break Down the Barrier with Roman Stewart
- Returns with the Dancehall DJs (1998) Nyam Up
- Unforgettable (2000) VP
- Ready to Groove (2004)

== Video releases ==
Stewart appears on the following concert videos:

- Reggae Sunsplash Dancehall '88 (1988) Charly (VHS)
- Western Consciousness Part Two (2005) Jet Star (DVD)
- Vintage Reggae Bash – Brooklyn 1983 (2007) Plastic Head (DVD)
