= Ites, Gold and Green =

Rastafari colors

In Rastafari, "Ites, gold and green" (often written as Ice, Gold and Green), refers to the colours associated with the Rastafari movement. The colours ites (red), gold (yellow) and green hold symbolic significance for Rastafarians and represent different aspects of their beliefs and identity.

== Ites ==
In Jamaican Patois the pronunciation of the letter "H" can vary due to dialects, many Jamaican dialects omit or pronounce the "H" sound less prominently than other English dialects, and is embraced as part of the Jamaican linguistic identity. Ites is a dialect pronunciation of 'heights', for example, 'Iya Ites' (or 'Iyaites') refers to 'higher heights'.

Additionally, Ites, in Jamaican slang, may refer to the colour red in Rastafari. Red is also associated with the Lion of Judah and the bloodshed and sacrifices endured by the African people throughout slavery and colonialism. The symbolism of the colour red can vary among different individuals and Rastafarian groups, and interpretations of colours can have personal or cultural variations.

== Gold ==
Gold (or yellow) represents the wealth and prosperity of Africa, as well as the spiritual wealth that Rastafarians aim to achieve. It symbolizes the richness of the African heritage, including their history, culture, and the achievements of African people.

== Green ==
Green represents the natural beauty of Ethiopia, which is highly revered in Rastafari. Moreover, green signifies the lushness and hope of the Earth namely that of the Promised Land of Ethiopia. Green also symbolizes growth, life, and the environment.

== In music ==
- Johnny Clarke - Ites Green & Gold (1976)
- Al Campbell - Ites Gold & Green (2000)
- Kelissa - Ites, Green and Gold (2016)
- Naram - Ites, Green & Gold (ft General Jah Mikey) (2018)
- Rob Syemonne - Ice Gold n Green (2019)
- Sistah Jahia - Ice Gold and Green (2022)

== See also ==
- English-based creole languages
- Jamaican English
- Rastafarian vocabulary
