= John Holt (singer) =

Jamaican reggae singer (1947–2014)

John Holt CD
- Born: John Kenneth Holt; 11 July 1947; Kingston, Jamaica
- Died: 19 October 2014 (aged 67) St John's Wood, London, England
- Genres: Ska, rocksteady, reggae
- Occupations: Singer, songwriter
- Years active: 1959–2014
- Labels: Treasure Isle, Greensleeves
- Formerly of: The Paragons

John Kenneth Holt CD (11 July 1947 – 19 October 2014) was a Jamaican reggae singer who first found fame as a member of The Paragons, before establishing himself as a solo artist.

== Early life ==
Holt was born in the Greenwich Farm area of Kingston in 1947. His mother Amy was a nurse. By the age of 12, he was a regular entrant in talent contests run at Jamaican theatres by Vere Johns, winning 28 contests, some broadcast live on Radio Jamaica.

== Career and recognition ==
He recorded his first single in 1963 with "Forever I'll Stay"/"I Cried a Tear" for record producer Leslie Kong, and also recorded a duet with Alton Ellis, "Rum Bumper", for producer Vincent "Randy" Chin.

In 1965 Holt joined Bob Andy, Garth "Tyrone" Evans, and Junior Menz in their group the Binders; Menz departed to be replaced by Howard Barrett and they changed their name to the Paragons. They initially recorded for Clement "Coxsone" Dodd's Studio One before cutting a succession of singles for Duke Reid at his Treasure Isle Studio in the rocksteady era of 1966–1968; They enjoyed a string of hits, including "Ali Baba", "Tonight", "I See Your Face", and the Holt-penned "The Tide Is High" (later made famous by Blondie and also covered by Atomic Kitten). "Wear You to the Ball" was another of his hits with the Paragons, and it made the charts again when U-Roy (whom he had introduced to Duke Reid) recorded a Deejay version over it. With Andy having left early on, the departures of Barrett (in 1969) and Evans (in 1970), who had both won scholarships in the US, brought the group to an end. During his time with the Paragons, he also recorded solo material for Bunny Lee ("Tonight"), and Harry J. He subsequently concentrated on his solo career, recording for Prince Buster ("Oh Girl", "Rain From the Skies"), Reid ("Stealing Stealing", "Ali Baba"), Dodd (including "Fancy Make-up", "A Love I Can Feel", "Let's Build Our Dreams" and "OK Fred"), Alvin Ranglin ("Strange Things"), and Phil Pratt ("My Heart Is Gone").

By the early 1970s, he was one of the biggest stars of reggae, and his work with producer Lee was key to his success; "Stick By Me" was the biggest selling Jamaican record of 1972, one of a number of records recorded with Lee. His 1973 Harry Mudie-produced album, Time Is The Master, was successful, with orchestral arrangements recorded in London by Tony Ashfield. The success of the string-laden reggae led to Trojan Records issuing a series of similarly arranged albums produced by Ashfield starting with the 1,000 Volts of Holt in 1973, a compilation of Holt's reggae cover versions of popular hits (and later followed by similarly named releases up to the Lee-produced 3,000 Volts of Holt). 1,000 Volts spawned the UK Top 10 hit "Help Me Make It Through the Night" (written by Kris Kristofferson), which peaked at number 6.

He had success back in Jamaica in 1976 with "Up Park Camp" (on a reworking of the Heptones' "Get in the Groove" rhythm), and his success continued into the 1980s with tracks such as "Police in Helicopter" and "Fat She Fat", recorded with producer Henry "Junjo" Lawes, and a standout appearance at the 1982 Reggae Sunsplash festival. "Police in Helicopter" was a condemnation of the Jamaican government's crackdown on marijuana plantations. The cover to the album single pictured Holt growing locks and a beard, an indication of the increasing importance of Rastafari in his life. He continued to tour regularly, performed several times at Sunsplash in the 1990s, and performed in the United Kingdom with the Royal Philharmonic Concert Orchestra, with a live album taken from these shows released in 2001.

In 2004 he was awarded the Order of Distinction (Commander Class) by the Jamaican government for his contribution to Jamaican music.

Holt's style, notably slower and more romantic than most of his contemporaries, is a recognisable forerunner of the lovers rock subgenre.

His song "Man Next Door" has been covered by numerous other reggae artists, including Dennis Brown, UB40 and Horace Andy. The latter sang in a more electronic vein for the Massive Attack album Mezzanine.

In February 2022, the 1973 compilation of Holt's recordings, 1000 Volts of Holt, received gold certification from the British Phonographic Industry (BPI) for sales in the UK.

== Personal life and death ==
Having been taken ill at the One Love Festival on 16 August, Holt died on 19 October 2014 in the Wellington Hospital in London. He had been diagnosed with colon cancer in June 2014.

He is survived by his wife Valerie, 12 children, and 25 grandchildren. His funeral took place on 17 November at Holy Trinity Cathedral in Kingston, and featured performances by U-Roy, The Silvertones, Tinga Stewart, Boris Gardiner, George Nooks, Luciano, Carlene Davis, Ken Boothe, and members of Holt's family, backed by Lloyd Parks and the We the People Band. He was buried at Dovecot Memorial Park.

== Album discography ==
- A Love I Can Feel (1971), Bamboo
- Like a Bolt (1971), Treasure Isle
- OK Fred (1972), Melodisc
- Holt (1973), Jaguar
- Still in Chains (1973), Trojan
- Pledging My Love (1972), Jackpot/Trojan
- Time Is the Master (1973), Moodisc
- Presenting the Fabulous John Holt (1974), Magnet
- The Further You Look (1974), Trojan
- Dusty Roads (1974), Trojan
- Sings for I (1974), Trojan
- A Love I Can Feel (1974), Attack
- Don't Break Your Promise (1974), Lord Koos
- Before the Next Tear Drop (1976), Klik
- Up Park Camp (1976), Channel One
- World of Love (1977), Justice
- Channel One Presents the Magnificent John Holt (1977), Channel One
- Roots of Holt (1977), Trojan
- Showcase (New Disco Style) (1977), Thunderbolt
- Holt Goes Disco (1977), Trojan
- In Demand (1978), Dynamic Sounds
- Let It Go On (1978), Trojan
- Super Star (1978), Weed Beat
- The Impressable John Holt (Disco Mix) (1978), Harry J
- Peace in the Sun (1978), Volt
- Just a Country Boy (1978), Trojan
- Introspective (1980), Dynamic Sounds
- My Desire (1980), Jackpot
- Children of the World (1981), VP
- A1 Disco Showcase (1981), Taurus
- Just the Two of Us (1982), CSA
- Sweetie Come Brush Me (1982), Volcano
- Gold (1983), Creole
- Police in Helicopter (1983), Greensleeves/Arrival
- For Lovers and Dancers (1984), Trojan
- Live in London (1984), Very Good
- Pure Gold (1985), Vista Sounds
- Wild Fire (1985), Natty Congo/Tad's (with Dennis Brown)
- Vibes (1985), Leggo Sounds
- The Reggae Christmas Hits Album (1986), Trojan
- From One Extreme to Another (1986), Beta
- Time Is the Master (1988), Creole
- Sweetie Come Brush Me – Greatest Hits (1988), ROHIT
- Rock with Me Baby (1988), Trojan
- If I Were a Carpenter (1989)
- Why I Care (1989), Greensleeves
- Reggae, Hip House, R&B Flavor (1993)
- Reggae Peacemaker (1993), House of Reggae
- All Night Long (1997), MIL
- New Horizon (1998), VP
- John Holt in Symphony with The Royal Philharmonic Concert Orchestra (2001), Jet Star
- Born Free (2001)
- Fist Full of Holt (2009)

There have also been dozens of compilations of Holt's work, starting in the early 1970s with a Greatest Hits compilation from Studio One, and notably followed by the 1,000 Volts... series on Trojan Records.

== DVDs ==
- John Holt in Symphony With the Royal Philharmonic Concert Orchestra (2003)
- John Holt & Freddie McGregor – Living Legends Live in Concert (2011)
