= Al Campbell =

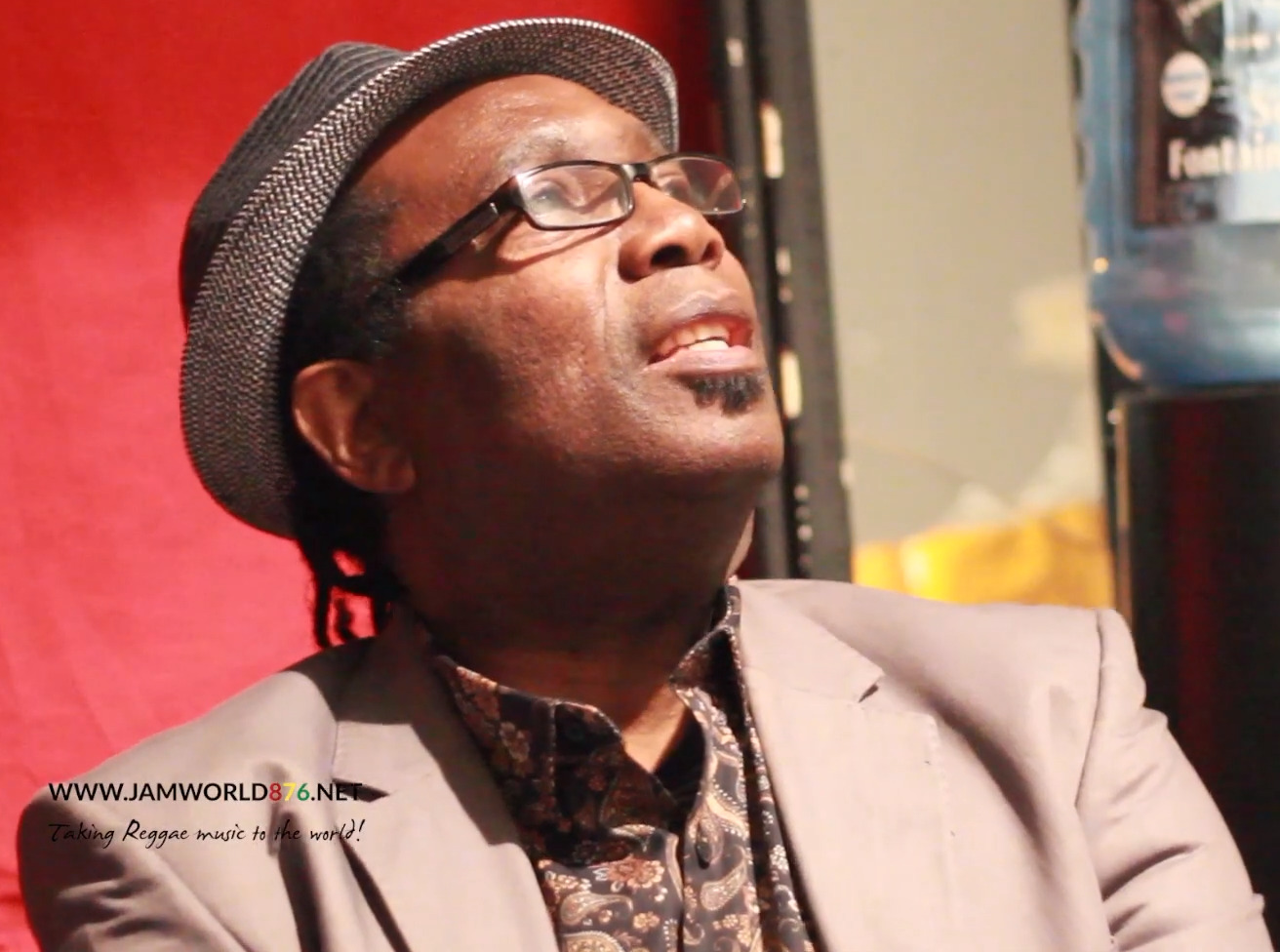
- Campbell in 2020

Background information
- Born: Alphonso Campbell; 31 August 1954 (age 71); Kingston, Jamaica
- Genres: Reggae
- Instrument: Vocals

Alphonso "Al" Campbell (born 31 August 1954) is a Jamaican reggae singer active since the late 1960s.

== Biography ==
Born in Kingston, Jamaica, Campbell's singing career began in church, where his father was a preacher, and Al would sing to raise funds. He went to school with Lloyd James (aka Prince Jammy) and formed a vocal group with friends as a teenager, called The Thrillers, who recorded in the late 1960s for Studio One. After briefly joining up with Freddie McGregor and Ernest Wilson, he went on to work with Prince Lincoln Thompson's Royal Rasses, and the Mighty Cloud band. Campbell then embarked on a solo career (also contributing vocals to two Heptones albums), and was a popular roots reggae singer during the 1970s, recording for producers such as Phil Pratt, Bunny Lee, and Joe Gibbs, and recorded at Lee Perry's Black Ark studio.

His "Gee Baby" was a big hit in 1975 in both Jamaica and the United Kingdom. He adapted successfully to the early dancehall and lovers rock styles in the late 1970s and 1980s, working with producers such as Linval Thompson. Campbell's recording of "Late Night Blues" (1980) became a staple of blues parties. Campbell performed with the Stur-Gav sound system in the early 1980s. More recently he has recorded for King Jammy, Philip "Fatis" Burrell, and Mafia & Fluxy.

In 1997, he joined Cornell Campbell and Jimmy Riley in a new version of The Uniques, the group releasing a self-titled album in 1999.

Campbell has not performed in Jamaica since a stageshow held by Jack Ruby shortly before the latter's death. He continues to tour Europe and North America

== Albums ==
- Gee Baby (1977) Phil Pratt/Sunshot
- Ain't That Loving You (1978) Jamaica Sound (reissued 1994 as Sly & Robbie Presents The Soulful Al Campbell)
- Loving Moods of Al Campbell (1978) Ital
- Mr. Music Man (1978) Manic
- No More Running (1978) Terminal
- Showcase (1978) DEB
- Rainy Days (1978) Hawkeye
- Diamonds (1979) Burning Sounds
- More Al Campbell Showcase (197?) Ethnic
- Mr. Lovers Rock (1980) Sonic Sounds
- Late Night Blues (1980) JB
- The Other Side of Love (1981) Greensleeves
- Dance Hall Stylee (1982) Narrows Enterprise
- Bad Boy (1984) CSA
- Freedom Street (1984) Londisc
- Forward Natty (1985) Move
- Shaggy Raggy (1985) Sampalu
- Reggae '85 (1985) Blue Mountain
- Fence Too Tall (1987) Live & Love
- Ain't Too Proud To Beg - LP (1987) Live & Love
- Bounce Back (1990) Reggae Road
- The Soulful Al Campbell (1994) Rhino
- Road Block (1997) Exterminator
- Revival Selection (1998) Kickin'
- 22 Karat Solid Gold (1998) Reggae Road
- 22 Karat Gold Volume 2 (1998) Reggae Road
- Rock On (1998) Charm
- Hit Me With Music (1998) Hot Shot
- Roots & Culture (1999) Jet Star
- Today, Tomorrow, Forever (2000) Reggae Road
- Deeper Roots (2001) Reggae Road
- Always In My Heart (2001) Artists Only
- Higher Heights (2002) Reggae Road
- Love From a Distance (2003) Cousins
- Tribute to Clement Coxsone Dodd (2004) Reggae Road
- 24/7 (2006) Reggae Road
- Rasta Time - Lagoon
- Talk About Love - Sonic Sounds
- It's Magic - free world music
