= Roman Stewart =

- Born: 11 May 1957; Kingston, Jamaica
- Died: 25 January 2004 (aged 46) New Hyde Park, Long Island, New York, U.S.
- Genres: Reggae, roots reggae, dub
- Instrument: Vocals

Roman Stewart, also known as Romeo Stewart (11 May 1957, Kingston, Jamaica – 25 January 2004, New York City) was a Jamaican reggae singer. Stewart won the Festival Song Contest in 1975.

== Biography ==
Roman was the younger brother of Tinga Stewart, and recorded his first single, "Walking Down The Street" in 1968. He recorded further singles in the early 1970s for producers Derrick Harriott ("Changing Times") and "God Son" Glen Brown ("Never Too Young"). In 1975 he won the Festival Song Contest with "Hooray Festival", written by Tinga and Willie Lindo, this success leading to the brothers initially being labelled as "festival singers". He had a big hit in Jamaica in 1976 with "Hit Song" (a.k.a. "Natty Sings Hit Songs"), about the desire to have a hit record in order to escape poverty, the same year in which he relocated to New York. He continued to visit Jamaica and went on to work with Phil Pratt and Linval Thompson, having another big hit in 1979 with the Jah Shaka and Lloyd Coxsone sound favourite, "Rice and Peas" Discomix, recorded with The Rockers All Stars and released on the Hungry Town record label.

Roman recorded two albums of duets with his brother Tinga – Brother to Brother and Break Down the Barrier – and he released a solo album, Wisdom of Solomon, produced by the conscious UK based roots reggae and dub sound engineer Gussie P in 2001, which included re-recordings of some of his earlier hits such as "Peace in the City" and "Rice and Peas".

On 24 January 2004, Stewart attended a concert by his long-time friend Freddie McGregor in Brooklyn and performed at a party later that night. After two songs, he cut short his performance, complaining of chest pains, and died from heart failure the next day at Long Island Jewish Hospital in New Hyde Park, Long Island.

== Albums ==
- Running Away From Love (1979) Island in the Sun
- How Can I Love Someone (1979)
- Ruling and Controlling (1987)
- Diplomat (1991) reissued on Continually (2000) TP (Errol Dunkley and Roman Stewart)
- Brother to Brother with Tinga Stewart
- Break Down the Barrier with Tinga Stewart
- Wisdom of Solomon (2001) Gussie P

== Video releases ==
Stewart appears on the following concert video:

- Vintage Reggae Bash – Brooklyn 1983 (2007) Plastic Head (DVD)
