= What Kind of World =

What Kind of World may refer to:

- What Kind of World (The Cables album), 1970, or the title track
- What Kind of World (Brendan Benson album), 2012, or the title track
- "What Kind of World", a song by Saint Etienne from their 2017 album Home Counties
