= Ernest Cupidon =

Jamaican comedian and actor

Ernest M. Cupidon was a Jamaican comedian and actor. He performed in an adaptation of Herbert George de Lisser's novel Susan Proudleigh and was known for his use of dialects and patois. He is credited by being the first actor to bring Caribbean dialect performance to Jamaican theatre and has been referred to as a "central figure" in the country's dramatic history during this era. Cupidon was active in the 1930s Jamaican entertainment industry.

During his career, he collaborated with other artists including Vere Johns and Tony Abelton. With Ableton, he performed as the "Cuoea and Abes" duo during the 1920a and 1930s. Part of his work was to participate in theatrical mock trials representing defendants being persecuted for their race. He was also known for his impersonations of women on stage.
