= The Sensations (Jamaican group) =

Jamaican vocal group

The Sensations were a Jamaican vocal group which performed backing on many of the reggae hits of the late 1960s and early 1970s. Membership was fluid but centred on the original members Jimmy Riley, Cornel Campbell, Buster Riley and Harold "Bobby" Davis.

They released "Just One Smile" as a single in 1969.

Harold "Bobby" Davis died in London on 21 April 2024, at the age of 77.
