= What Kind of World (The Cables album) =

Studio album by The Cables
- Released: 1970
- Recorded: Studio One, Kingston, Jamaica, 1968–1969
- Genre: Rocksteady
- Length: 31:17
- Label: Studio One
- Producer: Clement "Coxsone" Dodd

The Cables chronology
What Kind of World (1970)	Baby Why (1977)

Singles from What Kind of World
- 1. "What Kind of World" Released: 1968; 2. "Baby Why" Released: 1968; 3. "Love Is a Pressure" Released: 1968; 4. "Cheer Up" Released: 1968

Professional ratings
Review scores
Source	Rating
AllMusic	5/5 stars

What Kind of World is the debut album from Jamaican vocal trio The Cables. It was released in 1970 by Studio One, and collects tracks from singles the group recorded for the label. Backing was provided by Studio One house band the Soul Vendors, which included musicians such as Jackie Mittoo, Eric Frater, and Leroy Sibbles. The album has been described as "a masterpiece of early reggae", and "the most perfect of Studio One vocal albums".

The album was re-issued on CD in 1991 by Heartbeat Records.

== Track listing ==
1. "Baby Why"
2. "Be a Man"
3. "What Am I to Do"
4. "Got to Find Someone"
5. "No New Love"
6. "What Kind of World"
7. "My Broken Heart"
8. "Cheer Up"
9. "Let Them Talk"
10. "Love Is a Pleasure"
