= Hortense Ellis =

Jamaican musician

- Born: 18 April 1941; Trenchtown, Kingston, Jamaica
- Origin: Kingston, Jamaica
- Died: 19 October 2000 (aged 59) Kingston, Jamaica
- Genres: Reggae

Hortense Ellis (18 April 1941 – 19 October 2000) was a Jamaican reggae musician, and the younger sister of fellow artist Alton Ellis.

== Biography ==
Born in Trenchtown, her father worked on the railways while her mother ran a fruit stall. She was 18 years old when she appeared on the Vere Johns Opportunity Hour, then Jamaica's foremost outlet for young undiscovered talent. Her version of Frankie Lymon's "I'm Not Saying No at All" so impressed both audience and panel that she was invited back the following week. Ellis went on to enter many more competitions and showcases and she reached six semi-finals and four finals. In 1964 she was awarded a silver cup as Jamaica's Best Female Vocalist and went on to repeat this feat five years later.

During the 1960s, Ellis toured Jamaica with Byron Lee and The Dragonaires and had begun recording with some of the island's top producers such as Ken Lack ("I Shall Sing", "Hell And Sorrow" and "Brown Girl in the Ring"), Coxsone Dodd "I'll Come Softly" in 1963 and Duke Reid "Midnight Train", "Now And Forever", "I've Been A Fool" and "True Love" with Stranger Cole all in 1962.

Alton Ellis was also recording with Dodd at this time and the family connection was exploited by Dodd who produced "female" adaptions of some of Alton's hits (for Hortense to record) including "Why Do Birds" and "I'm Just A Guy". Dodd also paired Alton and Hortense in a run of duets such as "I'm in Love" and "Easy Squeeze".

The siblings toured Canada in 1970 but the following year, Ellis was back in Jamaica where she married Mikey "Junior" Saunders with whom she had five children in quick succession. Although her live performances suffered as a result, she remained busy in the studio. Recording under the name Mahalia Saunders for producer Lee "Scratch" Perry, she recorded several sides including "Right on the Tip of My Tongue" and "Piece of My Heart".

Ellis' success came in the late 1970s with a song recorded for Gussie Clarke; "Unexpected Places" was a big hit in Jamaica and also in Britain where it appeared on the Hawkeye label.

For producer Bunny "Striker" Lee, Ellis became Queen Tiney for her "Down Town Ting" – an "answer" record to Althea and Donna's big hit "Uptown Top Ranking", which had itself been based on the rhythm of Alton's big hit "I'm Still in Love With You".

Around this time, Ellis recut many of her Coxsone/Studio One sides with Soul Syndicate, The Aggrovators and the up-and-coming team of Sly Dunbar and Robbie Shakespeare. The rise of the Lovers Rock genre in the late seventies and early eighties led to Ellis cutting cover version of several popular soul classics including "Down the Aisle" (Patti LaBelle) and "Young Hearts Run Free" (Candi Staton). Following her divorce from Mikey Saunders, Ellis spent much of the eighties living in New York City and Miami. On returning to Jamaica in 1989, she began suffering health problems, but managed to carry on with occasional local live performances. She recovered sufficiently to make a private visit to New York in the summer of 1999, and then to Miami the following year, where ill health finally caught up with her.

Despite a worsening condition and the pleadings of her daughter, Sandra Saunders, to seek immediate treatment there in Miami, Ellis insisted on returning to her beloved Jamaica where she was hospitalised almost immediately, seriously ill and in considerable pain.

Hortense Ellis died in her sleep in a Kingston hospital on 19 October 2000 from a stomach infection.

== See also ==
- List of reggae musicians
