= The Uniques (Jamaican group) =

Jamaican rocksteady and reggae vocal group

- Origin: Jamaica
- Genres: Rocksteady, reggae
- Years active: 1966–1997
- Labels: Island, Trojan
- Past members: Roy Shirley; Slim Smith; Franklyn White; Jimmy Riley; Lloyd Charmers; Cornell Campbell; Al Campbell

The Uniques were a Jamaican rocksteady and reggae vocal group, formed in 1966 and active with varying line-ups until the late 1970s.

== History ==
The Uniques originally formed as a vocal harmony trio of Roy Shirley, Slim Smith, and Franklyn White, (the latter two from The Techniques) releasing a few singles in 1966 including the R&B influenced "Do Me Good" for Ken Lack's (Keith Calneck) Caltone imprint. The group then disbanded, until late 1967 when Smith formed a new version of the group with Jimmy Riley and Lloyd Charmers. The new line-up debuted with "Watch This Sound", a cover version of Stephen Stills's "For What It's Worth", which was a hit along with a string of subsequent singles, many produced by Bunny Lee, including "My Conversation", which Lee sold to Rupie Edwards, who used the rhythm to create the first one-rhythm album, Yamaha Skank.

Bunny Lee issued the Showcase vol. 1 album in 1978, as the group name was briefly revived by Riley and Cornell Campbell in 1977 for the album Give Thanks (not issued until 1979), and again in 1997 with Al Campbell joining Cornell and Riley on the album The Uniques.

== Discography ==
=== Albums ===
- Absolutely The Uniques (1969) Trojan
- Showcase vol. 1 (1978) Third World/Jackpot
- Give Thanks (1979) Plant (recorded 1977)
- The Best of The Uniques (1994) Trojan
- Watch This Sound (1998) Pressure Sounds
- The Uniques (1999) Charm

=== Singles ===
- "The Journey" (1966), Rio (B-side of Tommy McCook's "Jerk Time"), Caltone
- "Do Me Good" (1966), Rio (B-side of Tommy McCook's "Out of Space"), Caltone
- "Dry the Water" (1967), Collins Downbeat
- "People Rock Steady" (1967), Island
- "Gypsy Woman" (1967), Island
- "Never Let Me Go" (1967), Island
- "Let Me Go Girl" (1967), Island
- "Speak No Evil" (1968), Island
- "Lesson of Love" (1968), Island
- "Build My World Around You" (1968), Island
- "Give Me Some More of Your Loving" (1968), Island
- "My Conversation" (1968), Island
- "The Beatitude" (1968), Island
- "Girl of My Dreams" (1968), Island
- "Girls Like Dirt" (1968), Blue Cat (B-side of Glen Adams' "She Is Leaving")
- "More Love" (1968), Trojan (B-side of Race Fans' "Bookie Man")
- "Little Boy Blue" (1968), Giant (credited to Pat Kelly & The Uniques)
- "Facts of Life" (1968), Island (credited to Roy Shirley & The Uniques)
- "Watch This Sound" (1968), Trojan (credited to Slim Smith & the Uniques)
- "My Woman's Love" (1969), Crab (B-side of The Melodians' "When There Is You")
- "Forever" (1969), Duke (B-side of Lloyd Tyrell's "Cooyah")
- "Secretly" (1969), Dr. Bird
- "Too Proud to Beg" (1969), Gas
- "Crimson & Clover" (1969), Nu-Beat
- "I'll Make You Love Me" (1969), Nu-Beat
- "A-Yuh" (1969), Trojan
- "The Beatitude"/"My Conversation" (1969), Trojan
