= Roy Shirley =

Jamaican singer (1944–2008)

- Also known as: King Roy Shirley, The High Priest
- Born: Ainsworth Roy Rushton Shirley; 18 July 1944
- Origin: Kingston, Jamaica
- Died: July 2008 (aged 63) Thamesmead, London, United Kingdom
- Genres: Ska, rocksteady, reggae
- Years active: early 1960s–2008
- Labels: Amalgamated, Public, Weed Beat, Trojan, Hawk Records
- Formerly of: The Uniques
- Website: kingroyshirley.net

Ainsworth Roy Rushton Shirley (18 July 1944 – July 2008), better known simply as Roy Shirley, and also known as King Roy Shirley and The High Priest, was a Jamaican singer whose career spanned the ska, rocksteady and reggae eras, and whose "Hold Them" is regarded by some as the first ever rocksteady song. He was also one of the original members of Slim Smith's band, The Uniques.

== Biography ==
Shirley was born on North Street in Kingston, Jamaica, on 18 July 1944, and grew up in Trench Town, where he attended the Boys Town school, and after singing in his local church choir began his career performing in talent contests. His second prize performance on Vere Johns' talent show brought him to the attention of then Minister of Culture Edward Seaga and bandleader Byron Lee, who gave him work on shows that they promoted.

After early recordings for producer Simeon L. Smith went unreleased, he moved on to work with Leslie Kong, who released his debut single "Oh Shirley", co-arranged with his friend Jimmy Cliff, giving him a hit in 1965. Shirley then formed The Leaders along with Ken Boothe, Joe White, and Chuck Josephs. This group was unsuccessful, but Shirley went on to join Slim Smith and Franklyn White in the original line-up of The Uniques. When this line-up folded, Shirley recorded "Hold Them" in 1966, credited as one of the first rocksteady songs, and inspired by the beat from a Salvation Army band. Shirley attempted to perform "Hold Them" to a ska beat, but unable to make it work, slowed down the rhythm. He initially attempted to record the song with Slim Smith and Ken Boothe for producer Joe Gibbs, but it didn't work out, with the other singers struggling to break away from the ska style, and Gladstone Anderson suggested to Gibbs that Shirley perform the song solo. The song became a massive hit in Jamaica, and Shirley recorded several more singles for Gibbs, including "Dance Arena", "The World Needs Love", and "Music Is The Key", but these failed to match the success of the first single. Shirley moved on to work with Bunny Lee giving the producer his first hit with "Music Field", which was followed by others such as "Get on the Ball". Shirley's style draws heavily from American soul singers such as Solomon Burke. He became renowned for his ecstatic stage performances, often performing wearing a long silver cape with a high collar, and was described by the Jamaica Observer as "perhaps the most comedic performer to evolve out of Jamaican popular music". In late 1968, Shirley set up his own Public label and began self-production, releasing tracks such as "Prophecy Fulfilling", "Flying Reggae", and "On Board".

Shirley had another big hit in 1971 with "A Sugar" for Randy's. He toured the United Kingdom in 1972 with U-Roy and Max Romeo, and became based in the UK from 1973, setting up his All Stars Artistic Federated Union in 1976, with the aim of helping other artists to avoid some of the pitfalls of the music business. He released his first album in 1976, with The Winner. He recorded a single, "Love Your Mother" backed with "I Am The Merciful" which was released on Raymond Morrison's Hawk label in 1979. He performed at Reggae Sunsplash in 1982, and was included on the album of performances from the festival. Shirley opened a record shop in Dalston, London, and in his later years he set up the British Universal Talent Development Association, with the aim of supporting talented but underprivileged youngsters. He continued to perform occasionally, and his last show was at the Sierra Nevada World Music Festival in June 2008.

Roy Shirley died at his home in Thamesmead, London, in July 2008, aged 63. A memorial concert was held on 30 August, featuring performances from the likes of Derrick Morgan, Dennis Alcapone, B. B. Seaton and Michael Prophet. With the assistance of the Jamaican government his body was returned to Jamaica, where he was buried and where a memorial service was held, attended by musicians including Ken Boothe and Dwight Pinkney and representatives of the government.

== Albums ==
- The Winner (1976) Trenchtown
- Good News (1981) GG's
- The Return of the High Priest (1982) Weed Beat
- Control Them Volume One (1995) Della International
- Black Lion Negus Rastafari (1996) Lion Roots
- Get in the Groove (1997) Rocky One
- Music Is The Key (2003) Trojan
- Nice Up The City (2003) King Roy
- Your Musical Priest (2004) Westside/Demon
- The High Priest: The Great Roy Shirley Rhino
