= Tony Ableton =

Comedic performer in Jamaica (1895–1978)

Horace Arthur Ableton
- Born: 15 April 1895; Spanish Town, Jamaica
- Died: 1978 (aged 82–83)
- Other name: Tony Ableton
- Occupation: comedic performer
- Known for: M.B.E. in the Queen's Birthday Honour

Horace Arthur "Tony" Ableton (15 April 1895 – 1978) was a comedic performer in Jamaica and World War I veteran of the British West Indies Regiment (B.W.I.R.) He partnered with Ernest Cupidon in the duo "Cupes and Abes" during the 1920s and 1930s. Ableton was born in Spanish Town, Jamaica and attended Beckford and Smith. He joined the B.W.I.R during World War I and served in the 2nd Battalion. He was deployed to England, France, Egypt and Palestine and became an M.B.E. in the Queen's Birthday Honours in 1963.
