= Joya Landis =

American singer

Joya Landis, born Wanda Jeanne Vann (October 26, 1936 – April 17, 2013), was an American singer known for her ska and rocksteady records made in Jamaica with producer Duke Reid.

== Early life ==
Vann was born in Mound City, Kansas in 1936, and was the eldest of three children. After high school, she married a man from Wisconsin and moved to Queens, New York with their two children, where she worked as a nightclub singer. After co-writing and performing a single in the mid-1960s, she caught the attention of Jamaican producer Duke Reid was invited to come to Jamaica to record under the stage name Joya Landis.

== Treasure Isle era ==
In Jamaica, Landis recorded numerous rocksteady singles for Reid's Treasure Isle record label and Tommy McCook, leader of the Treasure Isle house band, three of which, Kansas City, Moonlight Lover and Angel of the Morning became hits. Her entire catalog was made available on various 'Greatest Hits' compilations released in the following decades.

Despite the success of her singles, Landis, a devoted Christian, instead chose to retire from public life and to return to New York to focus on raising her children.

Landis remained married to her husband until his death in 1985. She died in Lawrence, KS in 2013.
