= Just One Smile =

Single by Gene Pitney

from the album I Must Be Seeing Things
- B-side: "Innamorata"
- Released: 1965
- Recorded: 1965
- Genre: Pop
- Length: 2:37
- Label: Musicor (US); Stateside (UK)
- Songwriters: A-side : Randy Newman; B-side : Mimo Del Sud
- Producer: Gene Pitney

Gene Pitney singles chronology
"(In the) Cold Light of Day" (1966)	"Just One Smile" (1965)	"I'm Gonna Listen to Me" (1967)

"Just One Smile" is a pop song written by Randy Newman in 1960. An early version was recorded by Gene Pitney in 1965. It appeared on his 1965 album, I Must Be Seeing Things, and AllMusic noted that it "allowed Pitney to explore the extent of his dramatic range with its tale of the giddy highs and painful lows of a love affair".

The song became a Top 10 hit on the UK Singles Chart, although it failed to register in the Top 50 of the Billboard Hot 100, peaking at number 64. "Just One Smile" was Pitney's seventh consecutive Top Ten hit single in the UK.

"Just One Smile" was covered by Blood, Sweat & Tears on their 1968 album, Child Is Father to the Man. That version was just one of a number of covers of the song, which have been recorded by Dusty Springfield, Eternity's Children, Walter Jackson, Sheena Easton, and the Sensations, amongst others. For example, Marcia Hines covered the song on her Ladies and Gentlemen album (1977).

The original version of the song was recorded by the Tokens in 1965, on the B-side to their single, "The Bells of St. Mary's".

== Chart performance ==
Month	Year	Title	Chart positions			
Month	Year	Title	AU	CA	UK	US
November	1966	"Just One Smile" (A-side)	55	51	8	64
November	1966	"Innamorata" (B-side)	55			
