= Cornell Campbell =

Jamaican reggae singer

Cornel Campbell
- Cornel Campbell performing with The Slackers in 2000

Background information
- Also known as: Don Cornell, Don Gorgon
- Born: 23 November 1945 (age 80); Kingston, Jamaica
- Genres: Ska, rocksteady, reggae, lovers rock
- Occupation: Singer-songwriter
- Instruments: Vocals, guitar
- Years active: 1956 – present
- Labels: Studio One, Trojan, Joe Gibbs

Cornel Campbell, aka Don Cornel or Don Gorgon (born 23 November 1945 in Kingston, Jamaica) is a reggae singer, best known for his trademark falsetto voice, and his recordings at Studio One in the late 1960s and his later work with Bunny Lee in the 1970s.

== Biography ==
Campbell has one of Jamaican music's distinctive falsettos. His first name was mistakenly spelled with two L's on a record and has been commonly misquoted since. He prefers the correct spelling: Cornel Campbell. Campbell's singing career began in his local church choir.

At age eleven, in 1956, he was introduced to trombonist Rico Rodriguez, who took him to Clement Dodd's studio, where he recorded his first single, "My Treasure". Further singles followed, including "Turndown Date", as Jamaican music transformed from rhythm and blues to ska, with backing from The Skatalites.

He later recorded for King Edwards backed by The Bell Stars, before moving on to Duke Reid's Treasure Isle, where he formed The Sensations along with Jimmy Riley, Buster Riley, and Aaron Davis. When The Sensations split, Campbell emerged as leader of his own new vocal group, The Eternals, with Ken Price and Errol Wisdom, recording perennial favourites such as "Queen of the Minstrel" and "Stars". He was also briefly a member of The Uniques in the 1960s, although he may not have contributed to any recordings by the group at that time.

== Solo career ==
In 1971, performing now as a solo artist, Campbell began a long association with Bunny Lee, initially working in the lovers rock genre, but soon working more roots songs into his repertoire. His self-titled debut album appeared in 1973, but his popularity peaked in the mid-1970s with the 'flying hi-hat' sound (played by drummer Santa Davis), leading to major Jamaican hits "Natty Dread in a Greenwich Farm", "Dance in a Greenwich Farm", and "The Gorgon".

He later enjoyed a huge hit in the early 1980s rub-a-dub era with "Boxing" for Joe Gibbs. Throughout the 1970s, he also recorded with other record producers such as Winston Holness ("I Heart Is Clean") and Winston Riley ("Them A Bad"). By the late 1970s, Campbell's popularity had begun to wane and he increasingly concentrated on love songs, and after the mid-1980s, new recordings were less common, although he has maintained a strong following.

The Uniques were revived in the late 1970s, with Campbell joining Jimmy Riley and Lloyd Charmers in the group. This line-up recorded the Showcase vol. 1 album, and Campbell and Riley recorded the Give Thanks album in 1979. The group was again revived in 1997, with a line-up of Riley, Cornell Campbell, and Al Campbell, the group recording a self-titled album.

In 2001, "King in My Empire", featuring Cornell Campbell, was released by Rhythm & Sound. The song was produced by Moritz Von Oswald and Mark Ernestus.

== Albums ==
=== Solo ===
- Cornel Campbell (1973) Trojan
- Natty Dread in a Greenwich Farm (1975) Total Sounds
- Dance in a Greenwich Farm (1975) Grounation
- The Gorgon (1976) Total Sounds/Angen
- Stalowatt (1976) Third World
- Turn Back The Hands of Time (1977) Third World
- Showcase (1978), Big Phil
- Superstar (1979) Micron (reissued as Sweet Baby (1979) Burning Sounds/Abraham)
- Yes I Will (1979) Micron
- The Inspector General (1980) Imperial
- Ropin' (1980) Justice
- Boxing (1982) Starlight
- Boxing Round (1982) Joe Gibbs
- What's Happening To Me (1982) Joe Gibbs
- Follow Instructions (1983) Mobiliser (reissued as Press Along Natty (1993) Tappa)
- Money (1983) Live & Learn
- Fight Against Corruption (1983) Vista (reissued as Tell The People (1997) Prestige)
- Big Things (2000) Don One
- Rock My Soul (2008) Sip a Cup
- New Scroll (2013), Zion High
- Nothing Can Stop Us (2013), Strut – Cornell Campbell meets The Soothsayers
- Sweet Baby (2021) Burning Sounds

Split albums

- Johnnie Clarke Meets Cornell Campbell (1983) Vista (split with Johnnie Clarke)
- Cornell Campbell Meets The Gaylads (1984) Culture Press (split with The Gaylads)
- Double Top (1991) Tamoki Wambesi (split with Junior Reid)
- Barry Brown Meets Cornell Campbell (2001) Culture Press (with Barry Brown)

Compilations

- Reggae Sun (1980)
- Silver Jubilee (1993) Rhino
- Sweet Dancehall Collection (1995) JA Classics
- Collection: 20 Magnificent Hits, Striker Lee
- Magic Spell (1999) Studio One
- Sings Hits From Studio One And More (1999) Rhino
- The Minstrel (2000) Westside
- I Shall Not Remove (2000) Blood & Fire
- My Confession (2002) Charly
- Original Blue Recordings (2003) Moll Selekta
- Natty Dread (2005) Trojan
- My Destination (2005) Kingston Sounds
- Very Best (2006) Super Power
- Legend (2011), Justice
- Twenty Love Songs (2011), Culture Town
- 70 Greatest Hits (2013), Alexander Music Group
- 12" Collection (2014), Alexander Music Group
- I Man A The Stal-A-Watt (2019), 17 North Parade

=== With The Uniques ===
- Showcase Vol. 1 (1978) Third World/Jackpot
- Give Thanks (1979) Plant
- The Uniques (1999) Charm

== See also ==
- List of reggae musicians
