= Ken Boothe =

Jamaican singer (born 1948)

Ken Boothe OD
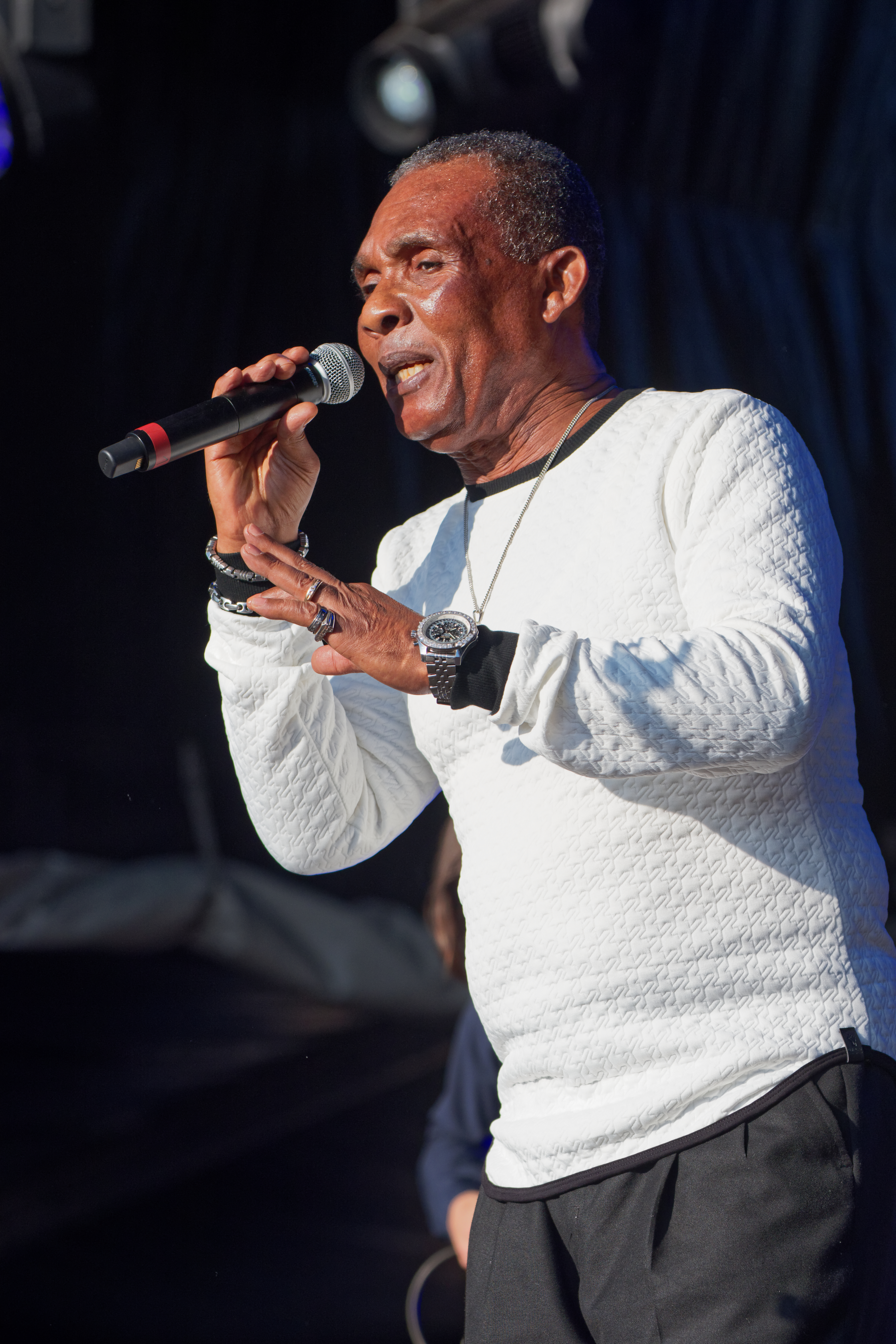
- Boothe performing in 2018

Background information
- Born: Kenneth George Boothe; 22 March 1948 (age 77); Kingston, Colony of Jamaica
- Genres: Ska, rocksteady, reggae, lovers rock
- Occupation: Singer
- Years active: 1960s–present
- Labels: Studio One, Trojan
- Website: kenboothemusic.com

Kenneth George Boothe OD (born 22 March 1948) is a Jamaican vocalist known for his distinctive vibrato and timbre. Boothe achieved an international reputation as one of Jamaica's finest vocalists through a series of crossover hits that appealed to both reggae fans and mainstream audiences.

== Biography ==
Ken Boothe was born in Denham Town, Kingston. He attended Denham Primary Elementary School and during this period developed an interest in music after receiving encouragement from his eldest sister, Hyacinth Clover, who was an established vocalist. Boothe cites singer Owen Gray as a major influence, particularly after hearing Gray perform the Leiber and Stoller rhythm and blues version of the 1920s blues standard, "Kansas City Blues", written by E L Bowman and notably performed by Jim Jackson in 1927. Stranger Cole, who was an established artist and neighbor to Boothe, had already worked with Boothe on the Sir Percy sound system as well as recording two songs for independent producer Sir Mike though Boothe's major breakthrough came in 1963 after Cole arranged an audition at Duke Reid's studio. The audition with Cole and Boothe performing their song "Uno Dos Tres" was a success and Boothe and Cole formed the duo 'Stranger & Ken' with the first track released by them being "Hush Baby" on the B-side of Cole's Island Records single "Last Love". This was followed by the singles "Thick in Love" both released in 1963 on R&B Records. They released several more popular singles between 1963 and 1965, including "World's Fair", "Hush", and "Artibella". Boothe also recorded as a duo with Roy Shirley (as Roy & Ken), which resulted in the release of the single "Paradise" in 1966.

Boothe's first solo tracks were recorded in 1966 after Clement "Coxsone" Dodd had signed him to his Studio One Label. He also recorded material for Phil Pratt and Sonia Pottinger the same year. He had almost immediate success with songs including "The Train Is Coming" (on which he was backed by the Wailers), the first, ska version, of later reggae song You're No Good with Soulettes (the group Bob Marley's future wife Rita Anderson was in) on B-side, and "Lonely Teardrops". The following year, Boothe and Alton Ellis had a successful UK tour with the Studio One session group, the Soul Vendors. Boothe was promoted as "Mr. Rock Steady" by Dodd during this period. The rocksteady classic "Moving Away" was released in 1967 or 1968 on the Coxsone label. "Moving Away" is a song still popular today, and covered or sampled by many artists, among them Dennis Brown, Jackie Mittoo ("Macka Fat"), Jack Radics I-Roy, U-Roy ("African Message"), Janet Key, Jaime Hinckson, Romain des Bois, Bruno Mars, Al Campbell ("Dress Black" Garnett Silk ("It's Growing"), Half Pint ("Substitute Lover"), Wayne Wonder ("Time To Say Good Bye"), Leroy Smart ("Talk About Friends"), Sanchez ("Don't Worry"), Admiral Tibet ("Nuthin Nah Run" among many others. Many of Boothe's songs have been reused in one way or another. On the B-side of the single "Moving Away" was the instrumental "Streets of Gold" by the Skatalites. Boothe continued to record for Dodd until 1970, when he switched to producer Leslie Kong's Beverley's Records and reggae, where his success continued with hits such as "Freedom Street" and "Why Baby Why".

After Kong died, Boothe recorded for many of Jamaica's top producers during the early 1970s, including Keith Hudson, Herman Chin Loy, Vincent "Randy" Chin, and Phil Pratt. He then formed the group Conscious Minds with B. B. Seaton.

Under a new direction from record producer Lloyd Charmers, Boothe released "Everything I Own" on Trojan Records, which reached Number One in the UK Singles Chart in 1974. The song, written by David Gates, was given a sympathetic light reggae feel and it received airplay and an appreciative audience in the West Indies and was regularly played on the radio stations of the UK due to its "crossover" appeal. David Gates' own group, Bread, had had a minor UK hit with the song in the spring of 1972, but it had only reached No. 32. Boothe's reggae version of the song "Everything I Own" reached Number One in the UK Singles Chart on 26 October 1974, and stayed at the top of the charts for three weeks. It featured Lloyd Parks on bass guitar, Paul Douglas a.k.a. Paul Williams on drums, Willie Lindo on guitar, and Lloyd Charmers on organ, piano and percussion. The recording was produced by Lloyd Charmers.

Boothe had one more hit in the UK Singles Chart during the 1970s, "Crying Over You", which made No. 11, with Trojan Records' collapse and a split with Charmers losing much of the momentum built up by his two hits. Boothe recorded a reggae version of the standard "When I Fall in Love" which was released in 1974 on the Studio One label.

In 1978, along with Dillinger, Leroy Smart, and Delroy Wilson, Boothe was referenced by lyricist Joe Strummer in the Clash's song, "(White Man) In Hammersmith Palais". Boothe reunited with Charmers in the late 1970s when a revived Trojan Records released the albums Blood Brothers (first issued on LTD in 1976) and Who Gets Your Love, but the reunion proved to be short-lived. He continued to record during the 1980s and had a few hits during 1986 and 1987.

In more recent times, Boothe has recorded for Bunny Lee, Phil Pratt, King Jammy, Pete Weston, Jack Ruby, Hugh "Red Man" James, Castro Brown and Tappa Zukie. In 1995 a version of "The Train Is Coming", re-worked with Shaggy, was used in the soundtrack for the film Money Train.

A two-disc set of Boothe's recordings for Trojan, Crying Over You, was released in 2001.

Boothe was awarded the Order of Distinction for his contribution to Jamaican music by the Jamaican government in 2003.

== Discography ==
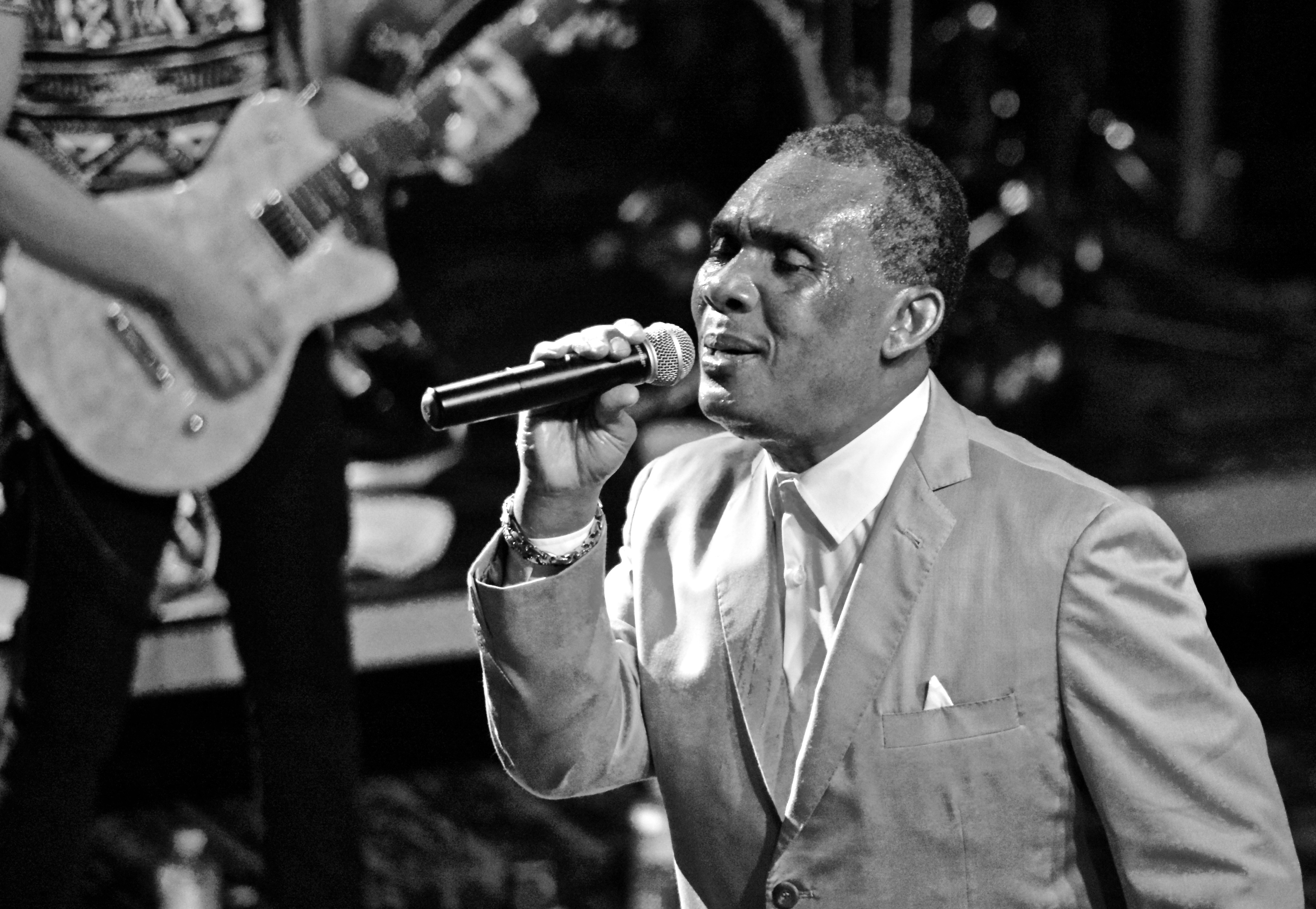
Boothe in concert on 6 November 2016 in Ghent

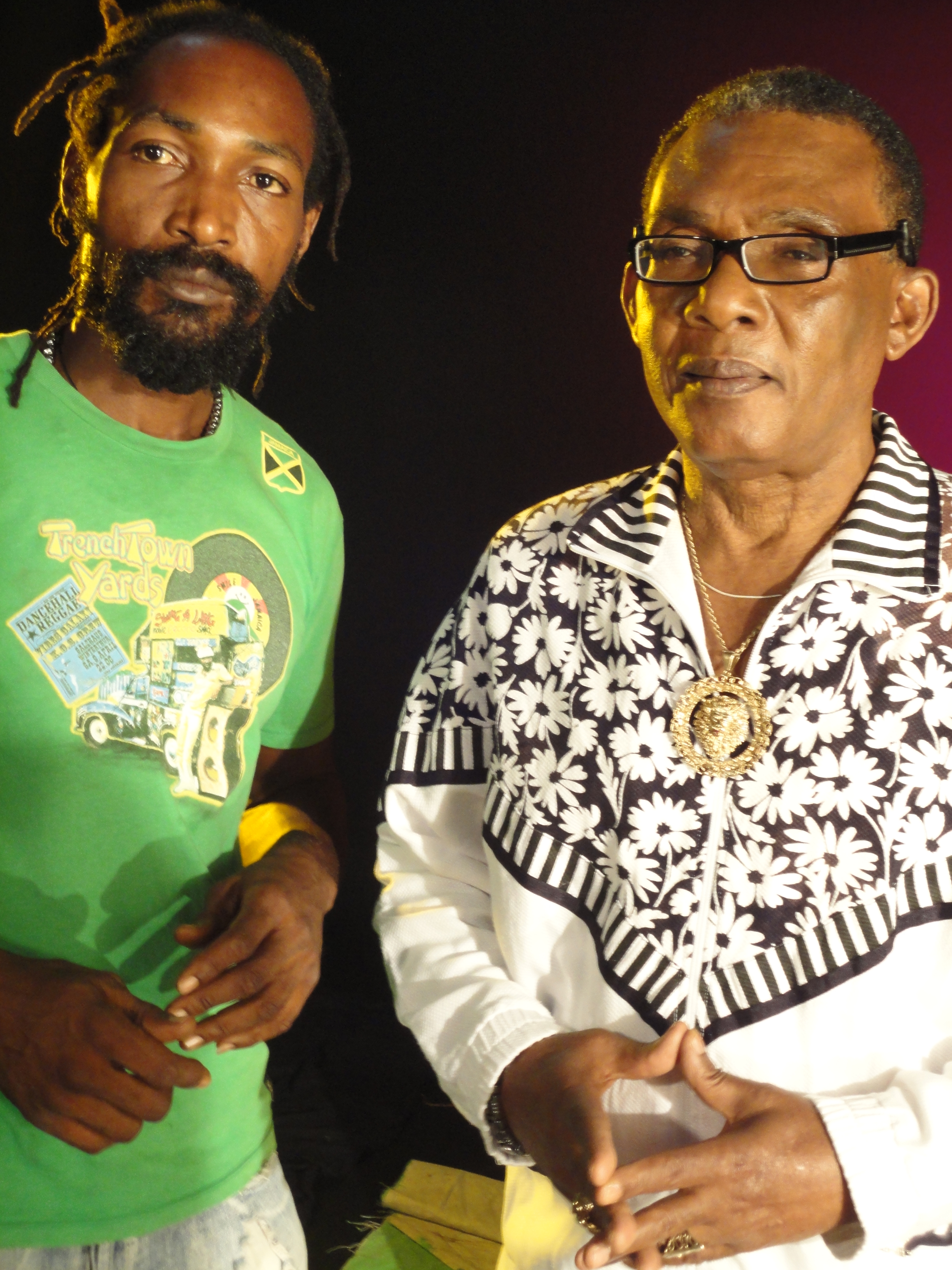
Boothe (right) with director Ras Tingle in 2011

=== Albums ===
- Mr Rock Steady (1967)
- More of Ken Boothe (1968)
- Freedom Street (1970)
- Boothe Unlimited (1972)
- Black Gold and Green (1973)
- Let's Get It On (1974), Trojan
- Everything I Own (1974)
- Blood Brothers (1976)
- Disco Reggae (1978)
- Showcase (1978)
- Who Gets Your Love (1979)
- I'm Just a Man (1979)
- Reggae For Lovers (1979)
- Got To Get Away Showcase (197?)
- Imagine (1986)
- Don't You Know (1987)
- Talk to Me (1990)
- Power of Love (1993)
- Natural Feeling (1995)
- Acclaimed (1996)
- Gospel Door 2 Door (2001)
- Love is the Ultimate (2003)
- Journey (2012)
- Old Fashioned Ways (with Jah Wobble) (2025)

=== Compilation albums ===
- A Man and His Hits (1974)
- Live Good (1978)
- The Ken Boothe Collection (Trojan 1987)
- The Ken Boothe Collection (Rhino 1995)
- Crying Over You - Anthology 1963 to 1978 (2001)
- Everything I Own - The Definitive Collection (2007)

=== UK hit singles ===
- "Everything I Own" - (1974) - UK No. 1
- "Crying Over You" - (1974) - UK No. 11
