= Massive Dread =

Massive Dread's self-titled debut album (1979)

Massive Dread (born Dennis James; c. 1960 – 1994) was a reggae deejay who first recorded in the late 1970s for Tapper Zukie and came to prominence in the early 1980s, touring with Byron Lee and The Dragonaires. Dread also worked on Peter Metro's Metromedia sound system.

== Biography ==
He introduced the "bubbling" style of delivery, which was well received by audiences at events such as Reggae Sunsplash, and his album Strictly...Bubbling (on The Wailing Souls' The Up Front Organization label, and produced by Tommy Cowan's wife Velerie) capitalized on his popularity, including Jamaican chart-toppers such as "This Is Massive". Dread's links to The Wailing Souls saw him appear on a Tyne Tees Television documentary on reggae which was broadcast on The Tube, featuring Dread performing wearing his riding hat - the 'jockey-ride' being a popular dance at the time in the Jamaican dancehalls. A second album followed in 1984 with It's Massive, which provided the hits "Young Gal No Sell Your Body" and "Justice Love and Harmony". A further album, 2 Dread Inna Babylon, split with Ranking Dread, appeared in 2006, although it features Tapper Zukie productions from the later 1970s/early 1980s.

In November 1993 Massive Dread, among others, started working on the Trenchtown Reading Centre - a community project designed to improve literacy and learning for the children of Trenchtown. The reading centre was completed in December and Massive Dread entertained at the opening as a deejay and selector.

In 1994, Massive Dread was shot and killed. Geoffrey Alex Domenico alleged it was for publicly speaking out against the JLP political authorities.

== Album discography ==
- Massive Dread (1979, His Majesty)
- 2 Dread Inna Babylon (2006, Silver Kamel) (split with Ranking Dread)
- Strictly...Bubbling (1982, The Up Front Organization)
- It's Massive (1984, The Up Front Organization)
