= Jet Set Records =

French record label

Jet Set Records is a French record label owned by Enzo Hamilton that specialized in Jamaican music reissues. It was most active in the 1990s.

== See also ==
- List of record labels
