= The Clarendonians =

Jamaican ska and rocksteady vocal group

- Origin: Clarendon Parish, Jamaica
- Genres: Ska, rocksteady, reggae
- Years active: 1965–1972, 1990s–2021
- Label: Studio One
- Past members: Ernest Wilson; Peter Austin

The Clarendonians were a ska and rocksteady vocal group from Jamaica, active initially from the 1960s and 1970s before reforming in the 1990s.

== History ==
The Clarendonians were originally Fitzroy "Ernest" Wilson and Peter Austin (who would also record as part of The Soul Lads), both from Hayes in Clarendon Parish, the duo coming together in 1963; at that time Peter was 17 years old, Ernest was 11. The duo won several talent contests and recorded their debut single, "A Day Will Come", at Federal Records with producer Leslie Kong. Leaving Kong, they moved on to Duke Reid's Treasure Isle studio. They came to the attention of Studio One boss and producer Clement Dodd, while they were still in their early teens. Dodd took the duo into the studio, and recorded a series of singles (including "Rudie Gone a Jail", "Sho Be Do Be", "Rudie Bam Bam", "You Can't Be Happy" and "Darling Forever" – all chart-toppers in Jamaica, and "You Can't Keep a Good Man Down") that helped to define the "rude boy" era of ska, alongside the other (initially less successful) young vocal group that Dodd was working with, The Wailers. Peter and Ernest brought the seven-year-old Freddie McGregor (who had to stand on a crate to reach the microphone), to the attention of Dodd. The young McGregor never recorded with the Clarendonians as a trio, but McGregor and Wilson recorded billed as Freddie & Fitzie.

Austin became disaffected with Dodd in the late 1960s and went on to record as a solo artist for producer Ken Lack, also recording a brace of tunes for producer Phil Pratt, but failed to match the success of his colleagues. He went on to work as an aviation supervisor at Norman Manley International Airport.

Ernest Wilson was the first member to establish himself as a solo artist, with singles such as "Storybook Children" and "If I Were a Carpenter", and briefly recorded under the name "King Shark", and with The Techniques. He continued to be sporadically successful through to the 1990s.

McGregor took some time to establish himself as a solo artist, working at Studio One as a session drummer and backing singer, but found success with "Bobby Babylon", and since the late 1970s became one of the biggest names in reggae.

Wilson and Austin reformed The Clarendonians in the 1990s and, in 2013, performed to celebrate the group's 50th anniversary. Wilson died in 2021, at the age of 69, and Austin died in 2023, at the age of 78.

== Discography ==
=== Singles ===
- "You Can't Keep a Good Man Down"
- "Be Bop Boy"
- "Mey Bien" (1965)
- "Rudie Gone a Jail" (1966)
- "Rudie Bam Bam" (1966)
- "I'll Never Change" (1966)
- "Musical Train" (1966)
- "Try Me One More Time" (1966)
- "Tables Going Turn" (1967)
- "Shoo Be Doo Be" (1967)
- "You Can't Be Happy" (1967)
- "He Who Laughs Last" (1967)
- "Love Me With All Your Heart" (1967)
- "Baby Baby" (1968)
- "Take It Or Leave It" (1968)
- "Ten Guitars" (1972)
- "Baby Don't You Do It" (1969)
- "Don't Please" (1969)
- "Funny Way Of Laughing" (1969)
- "Lick It Back" (1969)
- "When I Am Gone" (1970)
- "Come Along" (1970)
- "Seven In One" (1971)
- "Bound in Chains" (1972)
- "This Is My Story" (1972)
- "Darling Forever" (1972)
- "Night Owl" (1972) (Lee & The Clarendonians)
- "Doing the Jerk"
- "Why You Did It"
- "Good Hearted Woman"
- "Do It Right"
- "Goodbye Forever"
- "How Long"
- "Hurt By Love"
- "I Can't Go On"
- "If Only I Knew"
- "Stand by Me"
- "Sunshine"

=== Albums ===
- The Best of The Clarendonians (1968), Studio One
- Can't Keep a Good Man Down (1992), King's Music
- Reggae Psalms (2001), Jamaican Vibes
