= Vere Johns =

Jamaican journalist

Joseph Vere Everette Johns (28 November 1893 – 10 September 1966) was a Jamaican journalist, impresario, radio personality, and actor, who helped to launch the careers of many Jamaican musicians through his popular talent contests.

== Biography ==
Johns was born in Mandeville in 1893, and after working for the Post Office, served in the South Lancashire Regiment in World War I before finding success as a newspaper columnist in the United States in the 1920s. While in the US he divorced his first wife and married his second, actress Lillian May, known as "Lady Luck". He began running talent contests while in the US, and continued on his return to Jamaica in 1939. In the late 1940s he began a long-running "Vere Johns Says" column in the Jamaica Star newspaper, often on the topic of music.

He made a major contribution to Jamaican music with his "Vere John's Opportunity Knocks Talent Show" on RJR Radio and helped launch the careers of several major recording artists including Lloyd Charmers, Hortense Ellis, John Holt, Bob Andy, Desmond Dekker, The Wailers, Alton Ellis, Jackie Edwards, Dobby Dobson, Boris Gardiner, Laurel Aitken, and Millie Small. His talent contests began as theatre shows held in downtown Kingston venues such as The Majestic, Palace and Ambassador theatres, with the winners judged by audience reaction, and going on to appear on his radio shows. Producers such as Clement "Coxsone" Dodd and Arthur "Duke" Reid scouted for talent at the shows, taking singers to record at Stanley Motta's studio to cut records to be played on their sound systems. Lloyd Bradley, in his book This is Reggae Music, described Johns as "the most influential man in Jamaican music in the second half of the 1950s", a period in which indigenous Jamaican styles were coming to the fore. Johns, despite his antipathy towards Jamaica's Rastafarians, also provided exposure for Count Ossie's group of drummers after singer Marguerita Mahfood refused to appear on his show unless she was backed by Ossie's Mystic Revelation group; The group proved popular with the audience and went on to perform regularly in Kingston.

Johns also worked as an actor, performing in Shakespeare plays and solo recitations, and taught acting.

Vere Johns died in Kingston, Jamaica on 10 September 1966.

== Honours ==
- Military Medal, November 1917
- British War Medal
- Victory Medal
- Member of the Order of the British Empire, June 1953
- Seprod Award, 1964 and 1965

In 2008, Johns was posthumously inducted into the Jamaica Association of Vintage Artistes and Affiliates (JAVAA) Hall of Fame. In 2012, former Minister of Culture Olivia Grange called for Johns to receive a posthumous honour in recognition of his contribution to Jamaican popular music.
