= The Heptones =

Jamaican rocksteady/reggae vocal trio

- Origin: Kingston, Jamaica
- Genres: Rocksteady, reggae
- Years active: (1965–present)
- Labels: Studio One, Island, Ackee, Bamboo Records
- Members: Earl Morgan; Robert Dacres; Carlton Scarlett
- Past members: Leroy Sibbles; Barry Llewellyn; Naggo Morris

The Heptones are a Jamaican rocksteady and reggae vocal trio most active in the 1960s and early 1970s. They were one of the more significant trios of that era, and played a major role in the gradual transition between ska and rocksteady into reggae with their three-part harmonies. The Heptones were contemporaries of the Wailers and the Maytals, and every bit their equal in the mid-1960s.

== History ==
Leroy Sibbles, Earl Morgan, and Barry Llewellyn first came together as "The Hep Ones" in 1965 in Kingston, but they soon changed their name to "The Heptones". The name was chosen by Morgan after seeing a Heptones Tonic bottle lying in a pile of refuse.

The Heptones recorded for major Jamaican record producers at the time. They began their career, after one unsuccessful single for Ken Lack's "K Calnek" label, under the watchful eye of Coxsone Dodd of Studio One. The Heptones had a number of Jamaican hits for Studio One, beginning with "Fattie Fattie", their first Studio One single in 1966. This began a long run of success for Coxsone, including "Pretty Looks Isn't All", "Get In The Groove", "Be a Man", "Sea of Love" (a cover of the Phil Phillips and the Twilights doo-wop classic), "Ting a Ling", "Party Time", and "I Hold the Handle." They were the chief rivals to The Techniques, who recorded for Arthur "Duke" Reid, as the top vocal act of the rocksteady era.

During their five years at Brentford Road, the home of Studio One, Leroy Sibbles played bass on numerous sessions, auditioned acts, and, along with Jackie Mittoo, was the chief studio arranger. Some of their instrumental session work was released as the Soul Vendors and Sound Dimension. Amongst the rhythms featuring Sibbles' bass playing are Alton Ellis' "I'm Still in Love", "Full Up" (used on Musical Youth's "Pass The Dutchie"), and The Abyssinians "Satta Massagana". The Heptones remained at Studio One well into the reggae era, where they cut tunes such as "Message from a Black Man", "Love Won't Come Easy", "I Hold (Got) The Handle", "I Love You", and a successful cover version of "Suspicious Minds", then went on to record with Joe Gibbs and Harry J in the early 1970s. They had a big hit with "Book of Rules" (based on an American poem called "A Bag of Tools" by R.L. Sharpe) in 1973. It was one of the group's few songs not sung by Sibbles. Barry Llewelyn sang lead and co-wrote "Book of Rules". Musically, the song was heavily influenced by Glen Campbell's "Try A Little Kindness." The song was featured on the soundtrack for the 1978 Jamaican film Rockers, and the 1998 American comedy-thriller film Homegrown. Sibbles emigrated to Canada in 1973 and the group suspended recording activities, returning in 1975 to once again record at Harry J's Kingston studio.

In 1975, The Heptones signed an album deal with Island Records. Two albums resulted: Night Food in 1976 and Party Time in 1977. Night Food was produced by Danny Holloway, and featured several re-recorded Studio One classics, as well as originals such as "Country Boy" and "Mama Say". The group toured England with Toots & The Maytals to support Night Food's release.

In 1977, The Heptones recorded Party Time with Lee "Scratch" Perry. They had issued a number of singles (including a cover of Billy Stewart's "I Do Love You") on his Justice League imprint five years previously. Party Time was recorded during Black Ark's peak period. Party Time also included remakes of Studio One tunes, as well as Bob Dylan's "I Shall Be Released", along with newer compositions such as "Sufferers' Time". In the same era, they released a number of 12" singles with Lee Perry, such as "Mystery Babylon", "Mr. President" (featuring DJ Jah Lloyd), and "Babylon's Falling".

Sibbles left the group once more in 1978 to start a successful solo career, having already cut a solo version of "Love Won't Come Easy" for Augustus Pablo, and having cut his own solo singles for Lee Perry ("Rasta Fari" and "Garden of Life") and Dennis Brown's DEB Music ("New Song" and "Ain't No Love"). He was replaced by Dolphin "Naggo" Morris, who had recorded "Su Su Pon Rasta" for Joe Gibbs and "You Should Love Your Brother" for King Jammys, but the group's popularity waned. By the late 1970s, their slick stage suits and covers of pop tunes found little favour with audiences more used to more "militant" dreadlocked performers singing of Rastafari, and they began to be perceived as relics of an older era. Despite being produced by Joseph Hoo Kim at Channel One, Good Life (1979) saw the group treading water, and the years that followed brought little success. The original trio reunited in 1995, and released Pressure!, produced by Tapper Zukie.

Barry Llewellyn died on 23 November 2011, in Kingston Public Hospital, at the age of 64.

As of 2016, the line-up featured Morgan with Robert Dacres and Carlton Scarlett. This line-up recorded the album Rebel Love, released in May 2016.

== Influence and legacy ==
The Heptones were influential in the development of rocksteady, bridging the gap between the upbeat rhythms of ska and the slower, more soulful style of reggae that followed. Music historian Lloyd Bradley, in an interview with Leroy Sibbles, quotes him as saying:

Musically at that time there was much more singing, and that was when a group like ours really came into its own. We were listening to American groups like the Impressions and the Temptations, a lot of the new, soulful R&B, and our style was always more mellow, slower than ska. The Heptones were partly responsible for the change; from "Fattie Fattie" onwards we were mellow when most other guys were know for their speed.

The group’s harmonies and measured tempos became templates for later rocksteady and early reggae recordings.

== Discography ==
=== Albums ===
- The Heptones (1967)
- On Top (1968)
- Black is Black (1970)
- Freedom Line (1971)
- Book of Rules (1973)
- Cool Rasta (1976)
- Night Food (1976)
- Party Time (1977)
- Better Days (1978)
- Good Life (1979)
- King Of My Town (1979)
- Mr. Skabeana (with Alton Ellis) (1980)
- One Step Ahead (1981)
- On The Run (1982)
- Back on Top (1983)
- In A Dancehall Style (1983)
- Swing Low (1985)
- Changing Times (1986)
- A Place Called Love (1987)
- Sing Good Vibes (1988)
- Mr. "T" (1991)
- Observer's Style (1994)
- Pressure! (1995)
- Rebel Love (2016)
- Back On Top - Vinyl re-issue (2020) Burning Sounds Records
- Back On Top + In Dancehall Style (Split CD) - 2CD Digipack (2020) Burning Sounds Records
