= Channel One Studios =

Recording studio in West Kingston, Jamaica

Coordinates: 17.9960°N 76.8045°W

Channel One was a recording studio in Maxfield Avenue, West Kingston, Jamaica. The studio was built by the Hoo Kim brothers in 1972, and has had a profound influence on the development of reggae music.

== History ==
Joseph Hoo Kim's parents ran a bar and ice cream parlour in Kingston. Before entering the music industry, the Hoo Kim brothers operated jukeboxes and gaming machines. Following a government ban on gaming machines, they established the Channel One sound system. Joseph became interested in opening a recording studio after visiting Dynamic Sounds with John Holt, and the brothers opened Channel One Studios in 1973. Joseph purchased an API studio console for $38,000 and initially allowed other producers to record at the studio without charge to build up custom. When it opened, Channel One's tape recorders were capable of recording on a maximum of four tracks. There were early problems with the studio's sound, and the producer Bunny Lee recorded an album there with singer Alton Ellis that he did not release due to these issues. The problems were resolved within a year, and the first hit single recorded at the studio was Delroy Wilson's 1973 recording of "It's a Shame".

In 1975, the studio was upgraded to a 16-track recorder which enabled the audio engineers to record each instrument distinctly, lending intricacy to dub mixes and giving rise to the "rockers" sound. According to the 2006 book Caribbean Popular Music, the studio became widely known after the 1976 release of the Mighty Diamonds' album Right Time. Other artists to have successful recordings at the studio include Horace Andy, Leroy Smart, the Wailing Souls, the Meditations, Ernest Wilson, the Jays, and Jimmy Cliff, whose Follow My Mind album was recorded there.

The studio's house band, the Revolutionaries, were one of the top studio bands of the mid to late 1970s with a tremendous impact on the evolution of reggae music during that period, essentially driven by the innovative drumming styles of Sly Dunbar.

Joseph ran the studio and was credited as producer, Ernest acted as studio engineer, and Paul ran the sound system associated with the studio. Kenneth began producing in the 1980s. They became less involved after the second oldest brother Paul was killed in 1977, but it remained popular with other producers into the 1980s, with Sly and Robbie and Henry "Junjo" Lawes recording many of their productions there. The studio closed in the early 1990s. Kenneth Hoo Kim died from lung cancer in October 2013, aged 66.

The building was demolished in September 2026.

Channel One is also the name of the brothers' sound system and record label.
