= Delroy Wilson =

Jamaican singer

- Born: 5 October 1948
- Origin: Kingston, Jamaica
- Died: 6 March 1995 (aged 46) Kingston, Jamaica
- Genres: Ska, rocksteady, reggae
- Occupations: Singer, songwriter
- Years active: 1961–1995
- Label: Studio One

Delroy George Wilson CD (5 October 1948 – 6 March 1995) was a Jamaican ska, rocksteady and reggae singer. Wilson is often regarded as Jamaica's first child star, having first found success as a teenager. His youngest son, Karl "Konan" Wilson, has found success as part of British duo Krept and Konan.

== Biography ==
Delroy Wilson began his recording career at the age of 13, while still a pupil at Boys Town Primary School. Wilson released his first single "Emy Lou" in 1962 for record producer, Clement "Coxsone" Dodd. His early years with Coxsone yielded a number of ska hits, the biggest of which, the Lee Perry-written "Joe Lies" was an attack on rival producer and former Dodd employee Prince Buster. This was followed by another Perry-written attack on Buster, "Spit in the Sky". Further singles followed, including "One Two Three", "I Shall Not Remove", "Look Who Is Back Again" (a duet with Slim Smith), and another anti-Buster song, "Prince Pharaoh", notably the only record featuring the voice of Dodd himself. He is regarded as Jamaica's first child star.

His voice matured as he left his teens, around the time of ska's transition to rocksteady and this period in the late 1960s produced many hits including one of the first rocksteady records, "Dancing Mood", "Jerk in Time" (with the Wailers), "Feel Good All Over", "I'm Not a King", "True Believer in Love", "Rain From the Skies", "Conquer Me" and "Riding for a Fall". "Won't You Come Home", a duet with Ken Boothe on a riddim originally cut by The Conquerors for Sonia Pottinger has become one of the most-versioned Jamaican tracks ever. After leaving Studio One he recorded for other labels, with varying degrees of success, and set up his own short-lived W&C label. He enjoyed success with Bunny Lee in the late 1960s and early 1970s with tracks such as "This Old Heart of Mine", "Footsteps of Another Man", and "Better Must Come". His double A-side "It Hurts"/"Put Yourself in My Place" was a skinhead favourite and narrowly missed UK chart success. He recorded a version of "Run Run", a song he had originally recorded for Dodd, for maverick producer Keith Hudson.

In 1967, Wilson cut "Never Will Conquer Me" (aka "Conquer Me" or "Never Conquer") in a Rocksteady style for Clement "Coxsone" Dodd at Studio One, with a later version cut for Bunny Lee released in 1972. The tune was re-versioned again in 1974, in a slower conscious roots-rock Rastafari style by Dr. Alimantado at Lee Perry’s Black Ark studios, entitled “Can't Conquer Natty Dreadlocks”. The track later saw release on Alimantado’s iconic Best Dressed Chicken in Town album in 1978.

Wilson toured the UK and recorded for Trojan Records in 1970.

In 1972, Michael Manley's People's National Party chose Wilson's "Better Must Come" as their election campaign song. The same year saw the release of one of his most popular songs, "Cool Operator", which became his nickname.

Wilson worked with a string of producers in the years that followed : Joe Gibbs released "Pretty Girl", and "Mash Up Illiteracy", which was later versioned by Dr. Alimantado, and saw release on Steve Barrow's Blood and Fire compilation, If Deejay Was Your Trade : The Dreads At King Tubby's 1974-1977. Wilson also released the social consciousness Gussie Clarke production,"Love Love Love", and Winston "Niney" Holness' "Rascal Man", a righteous Carlton Barrett one drop rhythmchastising false Rastaman. These were followed by Harry J's soulful "Ask The Lonely", and Joseph Hoo Kim's version of a Stevie Wonder composition, the original soul tune,"It's a Shame".

In 1976, Wilson recorded a cover of The Wailers' "I'm Still Waiting" for Lloyd Charmers, which was hugely popular, and enjoyed some cross-over success, and was followed by the album Sarge, which is considered one of his strongest.

In 1977, Wilson recorded a Bob Andy produced song at Harry J's , a version of Tom Paxton's "The Last Thing on My Mind," which was well received, rising to number one in Jamaica.

In 1978, Wilson recorded a discomix steppers-rockers take on the soul standard, “Is It Because I'm Black” with producer Gussie Clarke, which further confirmed his reputation with the followers and acolytes of the Jah Shaka and Lloyd Coxsone sound systems, with The Guardian newspaper describing the power of the song as follows : “people loved it then and now because the statement…is such a defiant and proud affirmation…It’s what people have to do when you’re on the outside looking in and trying to figure out your place in a society which doesn’t appear to want you.”

Wilson continued to be successful until the end of the decade, but his career floundered during the early 1980s, with releases less common.

Wilson's fortunes revived considerably in the digital age however, with his well-received soulful lovers rock releases in the mid 80s for King Jammy on the Live & Love label, notably, Wilson's "Stop Acting Strange" ( which was also versioned by Frankie Paul as "Game of Love". There was also a cut by Wailing Souls entitled "You're My Days" ) which was backed by "Don't Put The Blame on Me" ( which Horace Andy versioned as "Girl Of My Dream").

Bunny Lee then released Delroy Wilson's "Ease Up" discomix, and the outernational single, "Tune In," matched by versions from Cocoa Tea, thus satisfying his older followers and confirming new listeners. “Tune In” was a sparse digital dancehall affair, put together by Philip "Fatis" Burrell who was at the time of working with Wilson in the mid 80s an up and coming Jamaican record producer who later found success with the prolific Xterminator record label during the digital reggae era, also influencing digital roots reggae and digital dub music.

New albums followed, but Wilson again drifted out of the limelight, with his health declining, and is best remembered for his earlier work.

Wilson was lionised by The Clash in their 1978 track punk rock garage band reggae fusion, "(White Man) In Hammersmith Palais" with the lines Delroy Wilson, you're a cool operator.

Delroy Wilson died at the age of 46 on 6 March 1995 at Kingston's UWI hospital, of complications from cirrhosis.

In 2013 Wilson was posthumously awarded the Order of Distinction by the Jamaican Government.

In 2015 Wilson's childhood friend Everard "Jah Ruby" Metcalf released the album The Delroy Wilson Story, featuring 21 cover versions of Wilson's songs.

== Albums ==
- I Shall Not Remove (1966) Studio One
- Good All Over (1969) Coxsone/Studio One
- Better Must Come (1971) Dynamic Sounds
- Captivity (1973) Big Shot
- For I And I (1975) Grounation
- Sarge (1976) Charmers
- Last Thing on My Mind (1977) Harry J
- Money (1977) Clocktower
- Mr. Cool Operator (1977) EJI
- Lovers' Rock (1978) Burning Sounds
- Who Done It (1979) Third World
- True Believer in Love (197?) Carib Gems
- True Believer in Love (197?) Micron
- Unedited (197?) Hulk
- Living in the Footsteps (1980) Joe Gibbs
- Go Away Dream (1982) Black Music
- Nice Times (1983) Vista Sounds
- Reggae Classics (1984) Londisc
- Worth Your Weight in Gold (1984) Burning Sounds
- The Dean of Reggae (1985) Mister Tipsy
- Looking For Love (1986) Phill Pratt
- Million Busters in Reggae (198?) Top Rank
- Super Mix Hits (198?) Pioneer International
- Dancing Mood Studio One
- Oldies But Goodies Pioneer International (with Owen Gray)
- Now (19??), Real Wax

Wilson's work has also been collected on over 15 'Best of' compilations and he features on dozens of compilations of reggae and ska music.

== See also ==
- List of reggae musicians
- List of roots reggae artists
- Rocksteady
- Lovers rock
- Music of Jamaica
