= Lloyd Charmers =

Jamaican singer and keyboardist

- Born: Lloyd Tyrell; 18 April 1946; Trench Town, Jamaica
- Origin: Kingston, Jamaica
- Died: 27 December 2012 (aged 66)
- Genres: Ska, reggae
- Instruments: Vocals, keyboards
- Labels: Splash, Soul Beat, Wildflower

Lloyd Charmers (born Lloyd Tyrell, 18 April 1946 – 27 December 2012, also known as Lloyd Chalmers, Lloyd Terell, or Lloyd Terrell) was a Jamaican ska and reggae singer, keyboard player and record producer.

== Career ==
Lloyd Charmers was born in Kingston, Jamaica. His professional career began in 1962, when he performed as the Charmers with Roy Willis on Vere Johns' Talent Hour, starting a recording career soon afterward. When the Charmers split, he joined Slim Smith and Martin Jimmy Riley in the Uniques. Charmers subsequently moved on to a solo career, releasing two albums in 1970, and also recording X-rated tracks such as "Birth Control" and the album Censored, these more risqué outings appearing under his real name or as 'Lloydie & The Lowbites'.

He was also briefly a member of The Messengers, a short-lived supergroup that featured Ken Boothe, B. B. Seaton and Busty Brown.

He set up his own record label Splash in the early 1970s, and moved into production. Productions by him were notable for their sophisticated arrangements, releasing music with Don Drummond, Roland Alphonso, Max Romeo, Tommy McCook, The Abyssinians, Roy Cousins, Cornell Campbell, Gregory Isaacs, and The Silvertones. With his session band the Now Generation he produced artists such as Ken Boothe (including some of Boothe's most successful solo releases of the period, such as his cover of David Gates' "Everything I Own"), B. B. Seaton, the Gaylads, and Lloyd Parks.

Charmers later relocated to the UK where he continued to record and produce in a variety of styles, from lovers rock to disco.

In 1980, UK ska band the Specials had a hit with "Too Much Too Young", an adaptation of Charmers' 1969 song "Birth Control". In 2001, Steve Barrow's Blood and Fire (record label) collected Charmer's rarities on an album entitled Darker Than Blue: Soul From Jamdown 1973 - 1980, introducing his work to a new generation of listeners.

== Death ==
Charmers died on 27 December 2012 from a myocardial infarction (heart attack) in London while driving.

== Discography ==
=== Albums ===
- House in Session by Lloyd Charmers & The Hippy Boys (1969, Pama Records)
- Reggae Charm by Lloyd Charmers with Byron Lee & the Dragonaires (1970, Dynamic Sounds/Trojan Records)
- Reggae Is Tight (1970, Trojan)
- Censored (1972, Lowbite) (as Lloydie and The Lowbites)
- Charmers in Session (1973, Trojan)
- Wildflower Original Reggae Hits (1974, Trojan)
- Too Hot To Handle (1975, Wildflower)
- Golden Days (1980, Sarge)
- Sweet Memories (1982, Echo)
