= Bunny Lee =

Jamaican record producer (1941–2020)

Bunny Lee OD
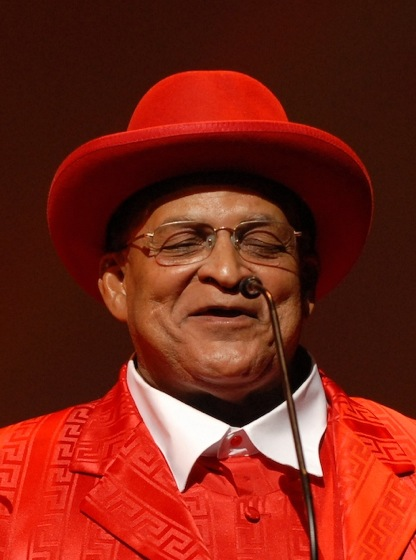
- Bunny Lee in 2007

Background information
- Also known as: Striker Lee
- Born: Edward O'Sullivan Lee; 23 August 1941
- Died: 6 October 2020 (aged 79)
- Genres: Reggae, rocksteady, roots reggae,dub music
- Occupation: Record producer
- Labels: Jackpot, Third World, Lee's, Striker Lee
- Formerly of: The Aggrovators

Edward O'Sullivan Lee OD (23 August 1941 – 6 October 2020), better known as Bunny "Striker" Lee, was a Jamaican record producer. He was known as a pioneer of the United Kingdom reggae market, licensing his productions to Trojan Records in the early 1970s, and later working with Lee "Scratch" Perry and King Tubby.

== Early life ==
Bunny Lee was born on 23 August 1941 and grew up in the Greenwich Farm area of Kingston, where his father was a shoemaker.

== Career ==
Lee began his career working as a record plugger for Duke Reid's Treasure Isle label in 1962, later performing the same duties for Leslie Kong. He then moved on to work with Ken Lack, initially in an administrative role, before taking on engineering duties. Lee then moved into producing (i.e. financing) records himself, his first hit record coming with Roy Shirley's "Music Field" on WIRL in 1967. Lee then set up his own Lee's label, the first release being Lloyd Jackson's "Listen to the Beat". He produced further hits during 1967–68 by Lester Sterling and Stranger Cole, Derrick Morgan, Slim Smith and The Uniques ("My Conversation"), Pat Kelly, and The Sensations, establishing him as one of Jamaica's top producers. Between 1969 and 1972 he produced classic hits including Slim Smith's "Everybody Needs Love", Max Romeo's "Wet Dream", Delroy Wilson's "Better Must Come", Eric Donaldson's "Cherry Oh Baby", and John Holt's "Stick By Me".

Lee was a pioneer of the United Kingdom reggae market, licensing his productions to the Palmer Brothers (Pama) and Trojan Records in the early 1970s.

The mid-1970s saw Lee work with his most successful singer, Johnny Clarke, as well as Owen Gray and Cornell Campbell, and along with Lee "Scratch" Perry, he broke the dominance of Coxsone Dodd and Duke Reid. Bassist Robbie Shakespeare was among the musicians who worked with Lee's Aggrovators before becoming a regular collaborator with drummer Sly Dunbar at Channel One Studios. This era also saw the emergence of the "flying cymbals" sound on Lee's productions, popularised by drummer Carlton "Santa" Davis with Lee's session band, the Aggrovators. Lee encouraged the development of the sound, which featured a prominent, clipped hi-hat pattern and became a dominant style of roots reggae for several years after 1974.

Lee was instrumental in producing early dub music, working with his friend and dub pioneer King Tubby in the early 1970s. Lee and Tubby were experimenting with new production techniques which Lee described as "implements of sound." Working with equipment that today would be considered primitive and limiting, they produced tracks that consisted of mostly the rhythm parts mixed with distorted or altered versions of a song.

With all the bass and drum ting now, dem ting just start by accident, a man sing off key, an when you a reach a dat you drop out everything an leave the drum, an lick in the bass, an cause a confusion an people like it...

Lee encouraged Tubby to mix increasingly wild dubs, sometimes including sound effects such as thunder claps and gunshots. In addition to King Tubby, dub mixers Prince Jammy and Philip Smart also worked extensively on Lee's productions, with most of Lee's dubs from 1976 onwards mixed by Jammy.

In addition to dub sides and instrumentals, Lee was among the first producers to recognise the potential of reusing the same rhythm tracks with different singers and deejays. He also used the Aggrovators to reinterpret older Studio One and Treasure Isle rhythms, introducing new arrangements, drum patterns, tempos and lyrics from a roots reggae perspective. Unlike some other major producers, Lee did not own a recording studio during this period, instead hiring facilities including Harry J Studio, Randy's Recording Studio and Channel One. The latter half of the 1970s saw Lee work with some of Jamaica's top new talent, including Linval Thompson, Leroy Smart and Barry Brown.

By 1977 Joe Gibbs and Channel One Studios with the Hookim Brothers became "the place to be", reducing Lee's prominence. However, during the late 1970s Lee produced almost every deejay, notably Dennis Alcapone, U-Roy, I-Roy, Prince Jazzbo, U Brown, Dr Alimantado, Jah Stitch, Trinity, and Tapper Zukie. Most of these were quick productions, usually to classic Studio One or Treasure Isle riddims. The aim was to get deejay versions on the street quickly and were usually voiced at Tubby's studio in the Waterhouse district of Kingston. In the early 1980s, Lee purchased Gibbs' studio in Duhaney Park, and continued producing, albeit on a less prolific basis than in the 1970s.

In 1983, Lee produced the first album by future star Beenie Man, titled The Invincible Beany Man - The 10 Year Old D.J. Wonder.

In March 2015, a fire at Lee's Gorgon Entertainment Studio destroyed equipment with a value estimated by Lee at JA$100 million.

In March 2020, Lee produced his last dub for the project "Sly & Robbie vs Roots Radics: 'The Dub Battle'". The song was "Dub My Mind" by Sly & Robbie feat. the Mighty Diamonds. https://dubblog.de/en/sly-robbie-vs-roots-radics-the-dub-battle/

== Recognition ==
In 1982 an episode of the Channel 4 documentary series Deep Roots was dedicated to Lee. Filmed in the control room of King Tubby's studio, it included a lengthy conversation with him and some of the musicians he has worked with over the years including Delroy Wilson, Johnny Clarke, Prince Jazzbo and Jackie Edwards. It then shows Lee producing a dub while Prince Jammy mixes. The program was released on DVD in January 2008.

In 2008 he was awarded the Order of Distinction by the Jamaican Government in recognition of his contribution to Jamaican music.

In 2013 a documentary film was released, I Am The Gorgon – Bunny 'Striker' Lee and the Roots of Reggae, directed by Diggory Kenrick, telling the story of Lee's life from childhood to the present, featuring U Roy, Dennis Alcapone, Lee "Scratch" Perry, Sly and Robbie, Johnny Clarke, John Holt and others.

== Personal life ==
Lee had one son, Errol Lee (born 1968), with singer Marlene Webber. Errol was believed to be running a non-profit organisation, Caring Kids' Concerts, which mentors young people using music, as of October 2020.

At the time of Lee's death, his wife was Annette Wong-Lee, mother to four of his children: two sons, Edward Jr. and Kirk, and two daughters, Toni Ann and Bonnie Lee.

== Death ==
Lee died at the age of 79 from heart failure on 6 October 2020. He had been suffering from several health issues, including kidney problems relating to diabetes, for some time.
