= The Techniques =

Jamaican rocksteady vocal group

- Origin: Jamaica
- Genres: Rocksteady, reggae
- Years active: 1962–1969, 1982
- Labels: Columbia, Island, Duke, Treasure Isle, Techniques
- Past members: Winston Riley; Slim Smith; Franklyn White; Frederick Waite; Pat Kelly; Jackie Parris; Lloyd Parks; Morvin Brooks; Bruce Ruffin; Dave Barker; Junior Menz; Tyrone Evans

The Techniques were a Jamaican rocksteady vocal group mainly active in the 1960s.

== History ==
The group was formed by Winston Riley in 1962 while still at school, with the initial line-up also featuring Slim Smith, Franklyn White, and Frederick Waite. They regularly performed at Edward Seaga's Chocomo Lawn club, where they were spotted by talent scouts from Columbia Records, who released their first single, "No One", released only in the United Kingdom in 1963. Their Jamaican debut came in 1965 when they were introduced to producer Duke Reid by singer Stranger Cole, with Reid-produced singles such as "Don't Leave Me", "When You Are Wrong", and "Little Did You Know" appearing on labels such as Island Records, and Reid's own Duke and Treasure Isle labels. Smith left the group in 1966, to pursue a solo career at Studio One, and later forming The Uniques with White. He was replaced by Pat Kelly. The shift from ska to rocksteady suited The Techniques, with a string of hits in 1967 and 1968 following, including "You Don't Care", "Queen Majesty", "I Wish It Would Rain", "It's You I Love", and "Love Is Not a Gamble".

The group left Treasure Isle in 1968, with Riley setting up his own Techniques record label, releasing further sides by the group and also his productions of other artists. The group's line up changed regularly with Riley the only constant member. Other members in the late 1960s included Lloyd Parks, Bruce Ruffin, and Dave Barker. Kelly returned for a time, recording lead vocals on "What Am I To Do?".

Riley became one of the most successful Jamaican producers of the 1980s. Kelly and Ruffin enjoyed successful solo careers. Parks worked as a prolific session musician as well as working as a solo artist. Barker found fame as part of the duo Dave & Ansell Collins. Waite emigrated to the UK where he managed Musical Youth, the band including his sons as members.

The Techniques were briefly revived in 1982, with ex-Paragon Tyrone Evans on lead vocals, releasing a re-recorded "Love Is Not a Gamble", and a new album.

== Discography ==
=== Albums ===
- Little Did You Know (1967) Treasure Isle
- Unforgettable Days (1981) Techniques
- I'll Never Fall in Love (1983) Techniques

=== Compilation albums ===
- Classics (1982) Techniques
- Classics vol. 2 (1982) Techniques
- Rock Steady Classics Rhino
- Run Come Celebrate (1993) Heartbeat
- Techniques in Dub (1997) Pressure Sounds
- Queen Majesty (2007) Trojan
