= Slim Smith =

Jamaican singer

Background information
- Born: Keith Smith; 5 October 1948
- Origin: Kingston, Jamaica
- Died: 9 October 1972 (aged 24)
- Genres: Rocksteady, reggae, ska
- Years active: 1960s–1970s

Slim Smith (born Keith Smith; 5 October 1948 in Kingston, Jamaica – 9 October 1972) was a Jamaican ska, rocksteady and reggae singer. In their book Reggae: The Rough Guide (1997), Steve Barrow and Peter Dalton described Smith as "the greatest vocalist to emerge in the rocksteady era".

== Biography ==
Smith initially came to notice as one of the members of the Victors Youth Band, who were praised at the 1964 Jamaican Festival. Following this he became a founding member and lead vocalist of The Techniques. Their recordings mainly took place for producer Duke Reid and were issued on his Treasure Isle label. In 1964 they recorded several songs for Byron Lee, two of which, "Don't Do It" and "No One", were included on the LP The Real Jamaica Ska released by Epic Records and co-produced by Curtis Mayfield. After the Techniques disbanded in 1965, he formed The Uniques, who released a handful of singles including the R&B influenced "Do Me Good" released on Ken Lack's Caltone Records label in 1966.

In 1966 Slim Smith commenced recording for Prince Buster and Coxsone Dodd's Studio One label, a major rival to Duke Reid. His hits from this period included "The New Boss", "Hip Hug" and "Rougher Yet", which later formed part of his compilation album, Born To Love. In 1967 a new line-up of The Uniques was formed, and they formed an association with another record producer, Bunny Lee. In 1968, Smith released "My Conversation", backed by "Beatitude" aka "Blessed Are the Meek", which, as the title suggests, was Smith's lyrical take on the Biblical verses from The Beatitudes from the Sermon on the Mount.The Uniques topped the Jamaican hit parade with "Let Me Go Girl", but after recording the album Absolutely The Uniques, Smith left the group to progress as a solo artist but still under Lee's tutelage.

Smith's song "Everybody Needs Love" was an immediate hit with a similarly titled album duly following. Despite further recording successes, by 1972 personal problems saw Smith being detained in the Bellevue sanatorium.

Smith died on the night of 9 October 1972, only four days after his 24th birthday. Unable to gain entry to his parents' house, he broke a window, badly lacerating his arm. He bled to death before he could receive treatment. His death stunned Jamaica, where his popularity as one of Jamaica's best vocalists saw numerous reissues of his output.

== Album discography ==
- Everybody Needs Love (1969, Pama)
- Just a Dream (1972, Pama/Trojan)
- Memorial (1973, Trojan)
- Early Days (1974, Striker Lee)
- Born To Love (1979, Studio One)
- Dancehall Connection (1986, Third World)
- Rain From The Skies (1992, Trojan)

There have also been numerous 'best of' compilations released.

== See also ==
- The Techniques
- The Uniques
