= Rocksteady =

Music genre that originated in Jamaica around 1966

- Stylistic origins: Ska; soul
- Cultural origins: Mid-1960s, Jamaica
- Derivative forms: Reggae

Fusion genres
- Reggae fusion

Other topics
- Music of Jamaica

Rocksteady is a music genre that originated in Jamaica around 1966. A successor of ska and a precursor to reggae, rocksteady was the dominant style of music in Jamaica for nearly two years, performed by many of the artists who helped establish reggae, including harmony groups such as the Techniques, the Paragons, the Heptones and the Gaylads; soulful singers such as Alton Ellis, Delroy Wilson, Bob Andy, Ken Boothe and Phyllis Dillon; musicians such as Jackie Mittoo, Lynn Taitt and Tommy McCook. The term rocksteady comes from a popular (slower) dance style which is the subject in the Alton Ellis song "Rocksteady" and matched the new sound. Some rocksteady songs became hits outside Jamaica, as with ska, helping to secure the international base reggae music has today.

== Characteristics ==
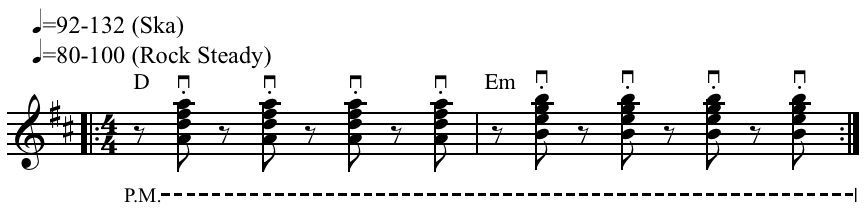
Ska/rocksteady rhythm

The Jamaican musicians and producers who developed rocksteady had grown up learning and playing jazz and had played through ska. In a similar way to what happened at Motown, the musicians responsible for playing this new sound would go jam in a jazz club after work.

Other influences were, most notably, American rhythm and blues–Fats Domino, Louis Jordan and many others– mento and African drumming. By the time rocksteady developed American soul music was popular, and that had an influence as well.

The tempo became slower with the development of rocksteady than it had been in ska. The guitar and piano players began to experiment with occasional accents around the basic offbeat pattern.

The slowing that occurred with rocksteady allowed bass players to explore more fat, dark, loose, slow tones than ska bass. The slower tempo and smaller band-sizes in turn led to a much larger focus on the bass line in general, which eventually became one of the recognizable characteristics of Jamaican music. In rocksteady, the lead guitar often doubles the bass line, in the muted picking style created by Lynn Taitt (as on "Run for Cover" by Lee "Scratch" Perry).

== Lyrics ==
Due in part to the heavy borrowing from US soul songs, many rocksteady songs are love songs; e.g. "Sharing You" by Prince Buster, which is a cover of a soul singer Mitty Collier's original, and "Queen Majesty" by the Techniques, which is a cover of "Minstrel and Queen" by the Impressions.

There are rocksteady songs about religion and the Rastafari movement, though not to the same extent as in reggae. Rocksteady coincided with the rise of rude boys and some rocksteady songs reflect this (usually negatively) such as "Rude Boy Gone A Jail" by the Clarendonians and, most famously, "Judge Dread" by Prince Buster.

Alton Ellis was anti-rudie, and Alton Ellis and the Flames' "Cry Tough", released before the term rocksteady was in vogue, urged Jamaicans in the ghettos to stay tough through the hard times.

== History ==
As a popular musical style, rocksteady was short-lived - the genre's heyday only lasted about two years, from around summer 1966 until spring 1968. However, its influence can still be heard in rhythms used today.

Also, in the middle to later part of the decade, as ska began to fade in popularity and the optimism that accompanied Independence in 1962 dwindled, young people from the Jamaican countryside were flooding into the urban ghettos of Kingston—in neighborhoods such as Riverton City, Greenwich Town and Trenchtown. Many of them became delinquents who exuded a certain coolness and style. These unruly youths became known as rude boys.

Alton Ellis is sometimes said to be the father of rocksteady for his hit "Rocksteady"; however, other candidates for the first rocksteady single include "Take It Easy" by Hopeton Lewis, "Tougher Than Tough" by Derrick Morgan and "Hold Them" by Roy Shirley.

One account of rocksteady's inception comes from the film "Studio One Drummie and the history of rocksteady music": rock steady music started at Studio One in 1966 because when Joe Isaacs at age 15 replaced Skatalites drummer Lloyd Knibbs, Isaacs could not play drums fast enough to keep up with the pace of ska - music director Jackie Mittoo (The Mozart of Jamaica), slowed down the tempo.

Another account comes from a Jamaican radio interview, pianist Gladstone Anderson said that bandleader Lynn Taitt made a suggestion to slow the music down whilst recording "Take It Easy". Taitt backed this up in a 2002 interview, stating: "I told 'Gladdy to slow the tempo and that's how Take It Easy and rocksteady came about. Rocksteady is really slow ska."

Rocksteady's dominance meant that all record labels of the time released music in the genre; Studio One, Treasure Isle, Bunny Lee and Prince Buster were predominant.

The record producer Duke Reid released Alton Ellis' "Girl I've Got a Date" on his Treasure Isle label, as well as recordings by the Techniques, the Silvertones, the Jamaicans and the Paragons. Reid's work with these groups helped establish the vocal sound of rocksteady. Some would consider the rocksteady years to be Treasure Isle's best.

Notable solo artists include Delroy Wilson, Ken Boothe and Phyllis Dillon (known as the "Queen of Rocksteady"). Other musicians who were crucial in creating rocksteady included keyboard player Jackie Mittoo, drummers Joe Isaacs and Winston Grennan, bassist Jackie Jackson and saxophonist Tommy McCook. When ska band the Skatalites disbanded (64/65—accounts vary) McCook went to work at the Treasure Isle label and Jackie Mittoo went to the Studio One label—these two artists/arrangers became instrumental in the way these two labels became dominant and helped to form the sound of Rocksteady.

Despite its short lifespan, rocksteady's influence is great. Many reggae artists began in rocksteady (and/or ska)—most commonly reggae singers grew out of rocksteady groups, e.g., Junior Byles came from the Versatiles, John Holt was in the Paragons, both Pat Kelly and Slim Smith sang with the Techniques (Pat Kelly sings lead on "You Don't Care") and Ronnie Davis was in the Tennors while Winston Jarrett was in the Righteous Flames. The Wailing Wailers were similarly a vocal harmony trio (modelled on the Impressions) who came from ska, through rocksteady and became a reggae band with just the one main vocalist.

Derrick Harriott noted, "Ask any Jamaican musician and they'll tell you the rocksteady days were the best days of Jamaican music."

== Transformation into reggae ==
Several factors contributed to the evolution of rocksteady into reggae in the late 1960s. The emigration to Canada of key musical arrangers Jackie Mittoo and Lynn Taitt—and the upgrading of Jamaican studio technology—had a marked effect on the sound and style of the recordings. Bass patterns became more complex and increasingly dominated the arrangements, and the piano gave way to the electric organ. Other developments included horns fading farther into the background; the introduction of a scratchier, more percussive rhythm guitar; the addition of African-style hand drumming, and a more precise, intricate and aggressive drumming style.

Also around this time (1969–70) the use of a vocal-free or lead instrument-free dub or B-side "version" became popular in Jamaica; at the beginning this involved the use of rocksteady tracks, most notably with U-Roy deejaying over Treasure Isle rhythms (made by a young Osbourne Ruddock, later known as King Tubby, beginning with "Wake the Town"). Indeed, this collaboration provided rocksteady with an afterlife as U-Roy rocksteady-based songs rode high in the charts (1970–71), even as reggae began to establish itself as the new sound.

By the late 1960s, the Rastafari movement became more popular in Jamaica and rocksteady became less popular. Many reggae songs became focused less on romance and more on black consciousness, politics and protest. The release of the 1972 film The Harder They Come and the rise of Jamaican superstar Bob Marley brought reggae to an international level that rocksteady never reached.

Although rocksteady was a short-lived phase of Jamaican popular music, its influence on what came after: reggae, dub and dancehall is significant. Many bass lines originally created for rocksteady songs continue to be used in contemporary Jamaican music. Such as the rhythm from "Never Let Go" by Slim Smith (sometimes known as the 'answer rhythm') and "Real Rock" both from the Studio One label; "My Conversation" also sung by Slim Smith, produced by Bunny Lee; "Queen Majesty" sung by the Techniques and "Lonely Street" by the Conquerors, both for Treasure Isle label.

== See also ==
- List of rocksteady musicians
