= Ernest Ranglin =

Jamaican guitarist and composer (born 1932)

The Honourable Ernest Ranglin OJ OD
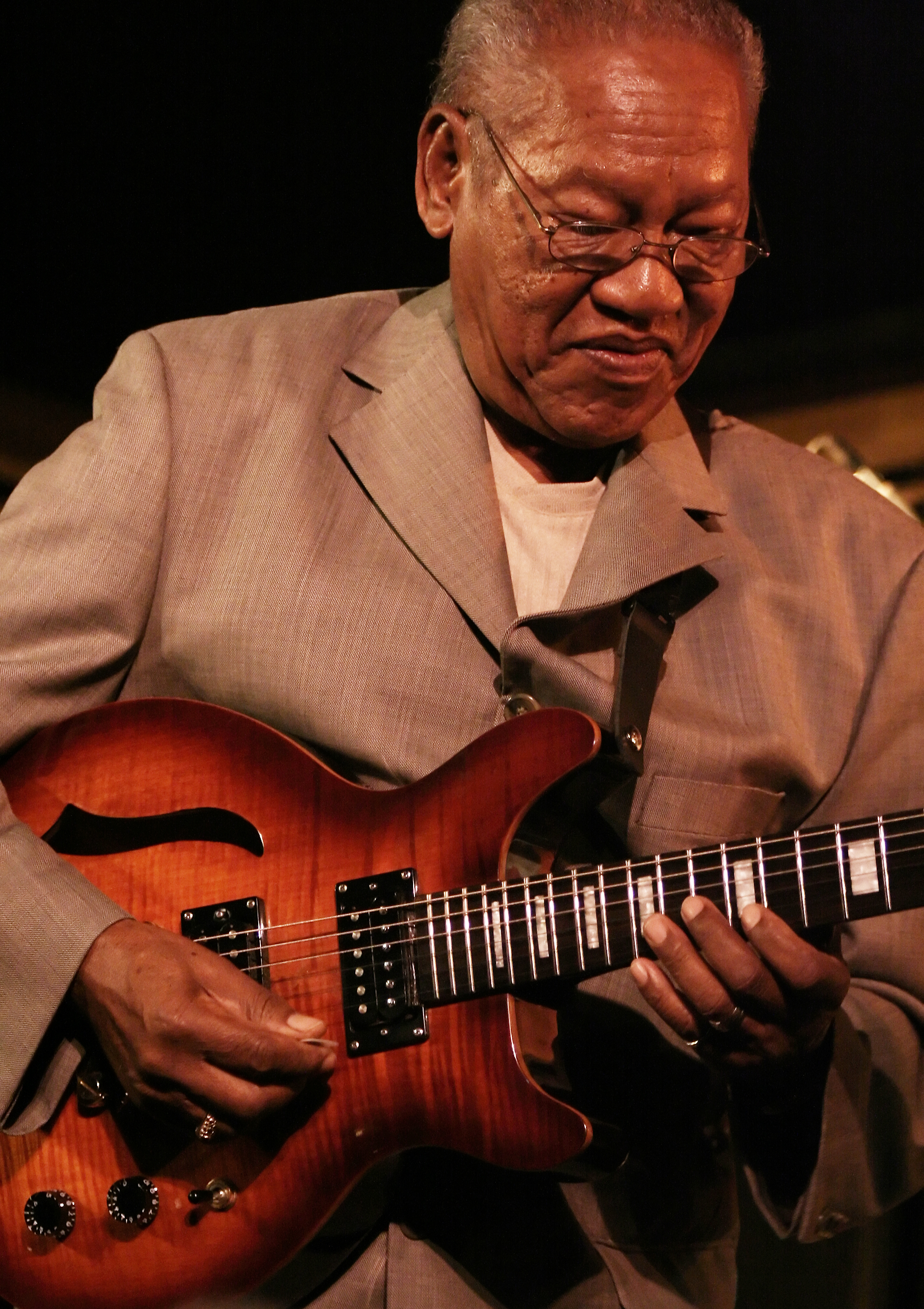

Background information
- Born: 19 June 1932 (age 94)
- Origin: Manchester, Jamaica
- Genres: Ska; rocksteady; reggae; jazz
- Instrument: Guitar
- Years active: 1947–present
- Labels: Federal; Island; Studio One; MPS; Palm Pictures; Telarc; AIX
- Relatives: Gary Crosby (nephew)

Ernest Adheir "Ernie" Ranglin OJ OD (born 19 June 1932) is a Jamaican guitarist and composer who established his career while working as a session guitarist and music director for various Jamaican record labels, including Studio One and Island Records. Ranglin played guitar on many early ska recordings and helped create the rhythmic guitar style that defined the form. He has worked with Theophilus Beckford, Jimmy Cliff, Monty Alexander, Prince Buster, the Skatalites, Bob Marley and the Eric Deans Orchestra. Ranglin is noted for a chordal and rhythmic approach that blends jazz, mento and reggae with percussive guitar solos incorporating rhythm 'n' blues and jazz inflections.

Ranglin was honoured with the Order of Jamaica in the 2021 National Honours and Awards on Jamaica’s 59th Anniversary of Independence.

== Early life ==
Ernest Ranglin was born on 19 June 1932 in Manchester, Jamaica. His family moved to Kingston, where he attended the Providence Primary School, Kingston Senior School and Bodin College. Ranglin's introduction to music was through two uncles who both played guitar. Initially a self-taught guitarist, he received some tutoring on how to sight-read from a violin player named Tommy Tomlins. At the age of 15, Ranglin joined the Val Bennett Orchestra, which was followed by a period of employment with the Eric Deans Orchestra. While performing locally with these orchestras, Ranglin was introduced to the jazz pianist Monty Alexander, which led to a lifelong friendship as well as numerous musical collaborations.

== Career ==
During the 1950s, Ranglin played guitar on calypso and mento releases, some of which were recorded for the tourist market. The 1958 albums The Wrigglers Sing Calypso at the Arawak as well as Jamaica Fabulous Island in the Sun - Denzil Laing and the Wigglers Sing Again (Kalypso FR 1002) recorded at Federal Studio are representative of the type of calypso floor show that Jamaican bands performed at hotels (some of the tracks from the original albums are included on the 2010 CD release Jamaica - Mento 1951–1958). He was employed as a guitarist by the Jamaica Broadcasting Corporation (JBC) between the years 1958 and 1965, with public radio broadcasting (radio services had been established earlier with the first broadcast transmitted in November 1939) commencing in 1959 and television broadcasting commencing in 1963. Ranglin also played with Cluett Johnson's studio band Clue J and the Blues Blasters; recording several tracks for Coxsone Dodd at Federal Studios, including the Theophilus Beckford hit "Easy Snapping" (recorded in 1956 and released in 1959), which he arranged and played guitar on. Ranglin also played on the Beckford tracks "Jack and Jill Shuffle" and "Shuffling Jug", the latter often considered as the first ska recording.

=== 1960s ===
In 1962, the James Bond film Dr. No was being shot in Jamaica and Ranglin was hired by Carlos Malcolm, music director for JBC, to compose music for some of the scenes set in Jamaica. Ranglin was also the bassist on many early Prince Buster hits, including the 1963 ska release "Wash Wash" - a situation that arose from his contractual obligations to Federal Records, which barred him from appearing as a named guitarist on recordings not made or licensed by them. In 1963, Ranglin played guitar on and arranged "My Boy Lollipop", which was sung by Millie Small, who had recently been signed to Blackwell's Island label. "My Boy Lollipop" (a cover version of a song written by Robert Spencer of the doo-wop group the Cadillacs and originally recorded by Barbie Gaye in 1956) became a worldwide hit after being released by Island on licence to Fontana in March 1964. Ranglin was also employed by Duke Reid as an A&R man for Reid's Treasure Isle label as well as fulfilling the same role for the labels Federal (owned and operated by Ken Khouri, who recorded and produced Ranglin's 1965 Guitar in Ernest album) and Gay Feet. His solo releases during this period saw him return to his jazz roots with the albums Wranglin (1964) and Reflections, (1965) both issued by Island. He was also involved with Merritone, a subsidiary record label started by Federal.

In 1964, Ranglin was in London with Blackwell, who was enquiring if it would be possible for Ranglin to play at Ronnie Scott's Jazz Club. Initially the manager of Ronnie Scott's was reluctant to agree but eventually allowed Ranglin to sit-in with the house band. The reception the audience gave to his performance overcame any reservations that the manager may have had and Ranglin was invited to become the venue's resident guitarist. He stayed for nine months, backing numerous guest artists as well as appearing onstage with the Ronnie Scott Quartet and Quintet. In 1964, a live set was recorded at the club which was released on the Fontana label as The Night Is Scott And You're So Swingable in 1966. Ranglin's tenure at Ronnie Scott's brought him to the attention of UK Jazz audiences with the Melody Maker′s readers duly voting Ranglin into first place in the guitar category of the paper's 1964 Reader's Jazz Poll. Upon his return to Jamaica he found himself once again doing A&R and session work for Federal (musical director from 1965 to 1972) and Coxsone. He was involved in the recording of the Wailers' track "It Hurts to Be Alone" released on the Coxsone label in Jamaica and subsequently released in the UK (1965) by Island records. Ranglin was also music director for the recording of The Melodians' song "Rivers of Babylon". The closing years of the 1960s found Ranglin working with the Jamaican producers Lee "Scratch" Perry and Clancy Eccles; both of whom were instrumental in developing and establishing the new genre of reggae. Ranglin played on the Eccles-produced "Say What You're Saying" (1967) by Eric "Monty" Morris, which he cites as one of the earliest records to feature reggae drumming.

=== 1970s to present ===
In 1973, Ranglin was awarded the Order of Distinction by the Jamaican government for his contribution to music. Ranglin frequently recorded Latin/Caribbean-infused jazz with Monty Alexander during this period, most notably the album Rass! (1974). Ranglin also toured with Jimmy Cliff in the dual role of music director/guitarist, which resulted in the 1976 album release In Concert: The Best of Jimmy Cliff. Ranglin was the lead guitarist on the Lee "Scratch" Perry recording sessions at Black Ark Studios for the Heart of the Congos (1977) album by the Congos.

In 1982, he moved to Florida, where he continued to record as well as taking the opportunity to perform more regularly at jazz festivals. In 1991, Ranglin's nephew Gary Crosby formed the group Jazz Jamaica; Ranglin and Jazz Jamaica performed together at Ronnie Scott's in October 2009 as part of the club's anniversary concert series. In 1998, he signed to Chris Blackwell's newly formed Palm Pictures label and released In Search of the Lost Riddim. That same year he played with Spearhead on "I Got Plenty 'o Nuthin", which was released on the Red Hot Organization compilation album Red Hot + Rhapsody. The albums E.B.@Noon and Modern Answers to Old Problems were released in 2000, followed by Gotcha! in 2001. In 2002 Ranglin was awarded an Honorary Doctorate Degree from the University of the West Indies for his outstanding contribution to the development of music in Jamaica. In 2006 he was the subject of a documentary Roots Of Reggae: The Ernest Ranglin Story produced and written by Arthur Gorson. In 2008, Ranglin was inducted into the Jamaican Music Hall of Fame by the Jamaica Association of Vintage Artistes and Affiliates (JAVAA). In November 2015, Ranglin announced that he would be retiring from the music business with a farewell tour in the summer of 2016. The tour featured musicians including Tony Allen, Courtney Pine, Ira Coleman, Cheikh Lô and Alex Wilson.

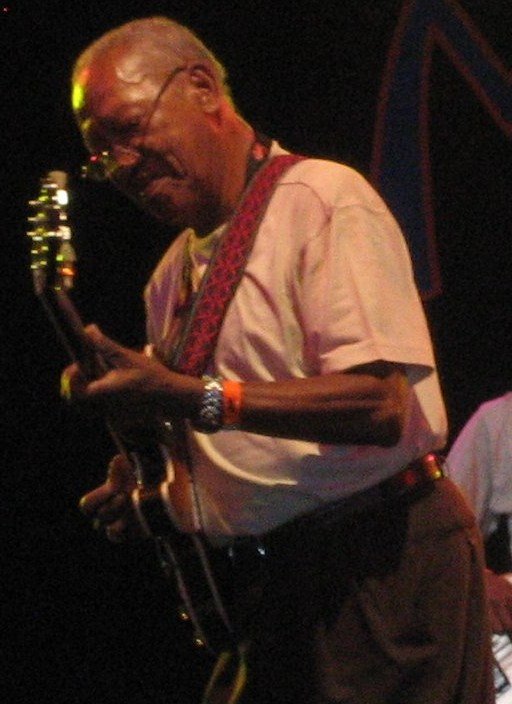
Ranglin performing at WOMAD in the UK in 2008

Ranglin was honoured with the Order of Jamaica in the 2021 National Honours and Awards on Jamaica’s 59th Anniversary of Independence.

In 2021 and 2022, he recorded the album Two Colors with saxophonist/producer Dean Fraser, which was released in May 2022.

== Discography ==
=== As leader ===
- Ernest Ranglin Trio, Guitar in Ernest (Island CB 23, 1961) – totally different from RCA Victor PC-1040; with 7 track
- Wranglin' (Island ILP 909, 1964)
- Reflections (Island ILP 915, 1965)
- Guitar in Ernest (RCA Victor PC-1040, 1965) – totally different from Island CB 23; with 9 tracks
- The Exciting Ranglin (RCA Victor LPJ-1002, 1966)
- Ranglin Presents The Zodiacs (RCA Victor RCA-101, 1966)
- A Mod a Mod Ranglin (Federal, 1966; Steady, 1970)
- Boss Reggae (FRM/Federal, 1969; Steady, 1970)
- Mr. Ernie Ranglin with Soul (Steady, 1969; RCA Victor, 1969)
- Softly with Ranglin (Twilight, 1969)
- Ranglin Roots (Aquarius, 1976)
- Ranglypso (MPS, 1976)
- Monty Alexander/Ernest Ranglin (MPS, 1981)
- From Kingston JA to Miami USA (Vista Sounds, 1983)
- Rum Raisin (RRR Productions, 1985)
- We Want to Party (Rooney, 1989)
- True Blue (Rooney, 1989)
- The Pensive Ranglin (Kinlin, 1993)
- Play the Time Away (Grove Music, 1995)
- Below the Bassline (Island, 1996)
- Memories of Barber Mack (Island, 1997)
- Tribute to a Legend (Kariang, 1997)
- Soul D'Ern (Jazz House, 1997)
- In Search of the Lost Riddim (Palm Pictures, 1998)
- E.B. @ Noon (Tropic, 1999)
- Modern Answers to Old Problems (Telarc, 2000)
- Gotcha! (Telarc, 2001)
- Alextown (Palm Pictures, 2005)
- Surfin' (Tropic, 2005)
- Order of Distinction (Milk River Music, 2009)
- Avila Featuring Ernest Ranglin (Avila Street, 2012)
- Bless Up (Avila Street, 2014)
- Jazz Jamaica (Federal, 2014)
- Two Colors (Tad's Record, 2022)

=== As sideman ===
With Monty Alexander

- Rass! (MPS, 1974)
- Love and Sunshine (MPS, 1975)
- Monty Strikes Again (MPS, 1976)
- Jamento (Pablo, 1978)
- Cobilimbo (MPS, 1978)
- Monty Alexander - Ernest Ranglin (MPS, 1981)
- Many Rivers to Cross (MELDAC, 1995)
- Yard Movement (Island, 1996)
- Rocksteady (Telarc, 2004)

With Jimmy Cliff

- Give Thankx (Warner Bros., 1978)
- I Am the Living (WEA, 1980)

With The Congos

- Heart of the Congos (Black Art, 1977)
- Congo Ashanti (Congo Ashanty, 1979)

With Alton Ellis

- Alton Ellis Sings, the Heptones Harmonise (Jet Star, 1999)
- Soul of a Man (All Tone, 2003)

With Gladiators

- Dreadlocks the Time Is Now (Front Line, 1990)
- Sweet So Till (Front Line, 1979)

With Floyd Lloyd

- Tear It Up (Tropic, 1997)
- Village Soul (Tropic, 1997)
- Mango Blues (Tropic, 1997)
- Our World (Tropic, 1999)
- Believer (Tropic, 2002)
- Mind Over Matter (Tropic, 2004)

With The Royals

- Pick Up the Pieces (Magnum, 1978)
- Moving On (Kingdom, 1981)

With Ronnie Scott

- The Night Is Scott and You're So Swingable (Fontana, 1966)
- When I Want Your Opinion, I'll Give It to You (Jazz House, 1997)

With Bunny Wailer

- Roots Radics Rockers Reggae (Shanachie, 1983)
- Crucial! Roots Classics (Shanachie, 1994)
- Communication (Solomonic, 2000)

With others

- Gary Barlow, Sing (Decca, 2012)
- Beenie Man, Art and Life (Virgin, 2000)
- Ken Boothe, Groove to the Beat (Jamaican Gold, 1999)
- Lloyd Brevett, The Legendary Skatalites (Jam Sounds, 1976)
- Cedric Brooks, United Africa (Water Lily, 1978)
- Dennis Brown, Light My Fire (Heartbeat, 1994)
- Jimmy Buffett, Take the Weather with You (RCA, 2006)
- George Faith, To Be a Lover (Black Swan, 1977)
- Sharon Forrester, Red Rose (Internal Affairs, 1995)
- Winston Francis, Mr Fix It & California Dreaming (Studio One, 1998)
- Earl George, Loving Something (Hit, 1978)
- The Heptones, Dub Dictionary (Trench Town, 1999)
- John Holt, I Can't Get You Off My Mind (Heartbeat, 2006)
- Keith Hudson, From One Extreme to Another (Joint, 1979)
- Charlie Hunter, Earth Tones (Green Streets, 2005)
- Winston Jarrett, Wise Man (Wambesi, 1979)
- King Tubby, Sound System International Dub LP (Clan Disc, 1976)
- Bernard Lavilliers, Clair-Obscur (Barclay, 1997)
- Little Roy, Live On (Tafari, 1991)
- Freddie McKay, Picture On the Wall (Studio One, 2017)
- Jackie Mittoo, Showcase (Studio One, 1980)
- Lee "Scratch" Perry, The Super Ape Strikes Again (Lost Ark Music, 2015)
- Prince Buster, It's Burke's Law (Blue Beat, 1965)
- Prince Far I, Megabit 25, 1922 Dub (Tamoki-Wambesi-Dove, 2004)
- Max Romeo, Reconstruction (Mango, 1977)
- Roots Architects, From Then 'Til Now (Fruits, 2024)
- The Skatalites, Herb Dub Collie Dub (Jigsaw, 1976)
- Millie Small, My Boy Lollipop & Oh, Henry (Island, 1980)
- Leroy Smart, Let Everyman Survive (Hit, 1980)
- Ernie Smith, Smith, That Is (London, 1972)
- St Germain, Tourist (Blue Note, 2000)
- Sonny Stitt, Sonny's Blues (Jazz House, 1995)
- Lincoln Thompson, Natural Wild (Vista Sounds, 1983)
- André Toussaint, André Toussaint (Bahama, 1965)
- Junior Tucker, It's a Small, Small World (Top Ranking, 1978)
- Jason Wilson, The Peacemaker's Chauffeur (Wheel, 2008)
