= Heart of the Congos =

Studio album by the Congos
- Released: 1977
- Recorded: 1976–1977, Black Ark, Kingston, Jamaica
- Genre: Roots reggae
- Length: 44:38
- Labels: Black Ark, Go-Feet
- Producer: Lee Perry

The Congos chronology
Heart of the Congos (1977)	Congo (1979)

Heart of the Congos is a roots reggae album by the Congos, produced by Lee "Scratch" Perry at his Black Ark studio with a studio band including Boris Gardiner on bass and Ernest Ranglin on guitar. The album was released in 1977. It is noted as being one of Perry's masterpiece productions of the Black Ark era.

The first issue of the LP in Jamaica was a very limited release said to consist of only several hundred copies. In 1980 it was reissued by The Beat on their Go-Feet Records imprint.

The album was remastered using the original Black Ark quarter inch master tapes with the exception of 'At The Feast' and re-released in 1996 on the record label Blood and Fire, run by Steve Barrow, T Elwing, and Mick Hucknall, with assistance on the ground provided by Andrea Lewis. The original mix of the album was not officially re-issued on either LP or CD until 2017's 40th Anniversary Edition (although an 'unofficial' CD release, sourced from the original LP, was released in 2004 by CORN-FED Productions, based in Amsterdam). Until 2017, all editions subsequent to the first Jamaica release feature a second, substantially different, mix by Lee Perry. The 40th Anniversary Edition includes both mixes of the album, as well as ten bonus tracks.

== Recording and production ==
The album was recorded in 1977 during sessions at Lee "Scratch" Perry's Black Ark studio. The Congos had initially consisted of falsetto singer Cedric Myton and tenor Roydel Johnson, but Perry added his regular vocalist Watty Burnett as a baritone to create a traditional three-part harmony group. According to Lloyd Bradley, Perry treated the singers' voices as additional instruments within the arrangements and mixes rather than as the music's central element.

== Critical reception ==
Professional ratings
Review scores
Source	Rating
AllMusic	5/5 stars
The Encyclopedia of Popular Music	4/5 stars
Q	5/5 stars
Robert Christgau	(3-star Honorable Mention)
The Rolling Stone Record Guide	4/5 stars
Sputnikmusic	5/5
Tiny Mix Tapes	5/5 marks

Barrow and Peter Dalton called Heart of the Congos "the most completely successful of all the albums recorded at the Black Ark," and "one of the prime examples of Jamaican vocal technique" due to the dynamic combination of Cedric Myton’s falsetto lead vocals, Roy "Ashanti" Johnson’s tenor lead vocals and backing vocals by noted singers such as Gregory Isaacs and members of the Meditations and the Heptones. The album was listed in the 1999 book The Rough Guide: Reggae: 100 Essential CDs.

Lloyd Bradley described Heart of the Congos as "one of the most consummate reggae albums ever made" and compared Perry's combination of traditional vocal technique and contemporary studio production to Norman Whitfield's work with the Temptations.

Pitchfork ranked the record at No. 46 on its "Top 100 Albums of the 1970s".

The NME ranked the album at 99 in its 2003 list of the "100 Best Albums of All Time".

== Track listing ==
All tracks written by Cedric Myton and Roydel Johnson, except tracks 1 and 2 written by Cedric Myton, Roydel Johnson and Lee Perry.

=== Side one ===
1. "Fisherman"
2. "Congoman"
3. "Open Up the Gate"
4. "Children Crying"
5. "La La Bam-Bam"

=== Side two ===
1. "Can't Come In"
2. "Sodom and Gomorrow"
3. "The Wrong Thing"
4. "Ark of the Covenant"
5. "Solid Foundation"

== 1996 CD track listing ==
=== CD one (Remix) ===
1. "Fisherman"
2. "Congoman"
3. "Open Up the Gate"
4. "Children Crying"
5. "La La Bam-Bam"
6. "Can't Come In"
7. "Sodom and Gomorrow"
8. "The Wrong Thing"
9. "Ark of the Covenant"
10. "Solid Foundation"
11. "At the Feast"
12. "Nicodemus"

=== CD two ===
1. "Congoman" (12" mix)
2. "Congoman Chant"
3. "Bring the Mackaback"
4. "Noah Sugar Pan"
5. "Solid Foundation" (Disco Cork Mix)

== 2017 40th Anniversary Edition CD track listing ==
=== CD one (Remix) ===
1. "Fisherman"
2. "Congoman"
3. "Open Up the Gate"
4. "Children Crying"
5. "La La Bam-Bam"
6. "Can't Come In"
7. "Sodom and Gomorrow"
8. "The Wrong Thing"
9. "Ark of the Covenant"
10. "Solid Foundation"

=== CD two (Bonus Tracks) ===
1. "Don't Blame It On I"
2. "At the Feast"
3. "Neckodeemus"
4. "Solid Foundation (Disco Cork Mix)"
5. "Foundation Dub"
6. "Congoman (12" Mix)"
7. "Congoman Chant"
8. "Bring the Mackaback"
9. "Fisherman Dub"
10. "Noah Sugar Pan"

=== CD three (Original mix) ===
1. "Fisherman"
2. "Congoman"
3. "Open Up the Gate"
4. "Children Crying"
5. "La La Bam-Bam"
6. "Can't Come In"
7. "Sodom and Gomorrow"
8. "The Wrong Thing"
9. "Ark of the Covenant"
10. "Solid Foundation"

== Personnel ==
Produced by the Congos and Lee "Scratch" Perry. Recorded at the Black Ark 1976–77, Cardiff Crescent, Washington Gardens, Kingston, Jamaica.

- The Congos – Cedric Myton and Roy "Ashanti" Johnson
- Boris Gardiner, Geoffrey Chung on "Fisherman" – bass
- Lowell "Sly" Dunbar, Mikey "Boo" Richards, Paul Douglas on "Fisherman" – drums
- Robert "Billy" Johnson – rhythm guitar
- Ernest Ranglin – lead guitar
- Winston "Brubeck" Wright – organ, bass on "Congoman"
- Keith Sterling – piano
- Noel "Skully" Simms, Uziah "Sticky" Thompson, Lee Perry – percussion
- The Meditations, Watty "King" Burnett, Gregory Isaacs (on "La La Bam-Bam"), Earl Morgan and Barry Llewellyn (on "La La Bam-Bam"), Candy McKenzie (on "Children Crying") – backing vocals
