= Ride with the Rasses =

Studio album by Lincoln Thompson & The Royal Rasses
- Released: 1982
- Genre: Reggae
- Label: Tuff Gong
- Producer: Lincoln Thompson

Lincoln Thompson & The Royal Rasses chronology
Natural Wild (1980)	Ride with the Rasses (1982)	Rootsman Blues (1983)

Ride with the Rasses is the fifth album by Jamaican reggae artist Lincoln Thompson. The album was released in 1982.

The Huddersfield Daily Examiner commented that the use of "unusual instruments" by the band creates a "refreshingly different sound without a lot of fancy effects only possible in the studio."

== Track listing ==
1. "One Common Need"
2. "Kinky Money Game"
3. "Come Spring"
4. "Fall Back"
5. "The Brotherhood Of Man"
6. "Ride With The Rasses"
7. "No Future At All"

== Personnel ==
- Drums: Michael "Boo" Richards
- Bass: Errol "Bagga" Walker
- Guitar: George Miller
- Lead Guitar: Lawrence White
- Keyboards: Pablo Black
- Percussion: Duke Ferron
