= Roydel Johnson =

Jamaican musical artist (born 1943)

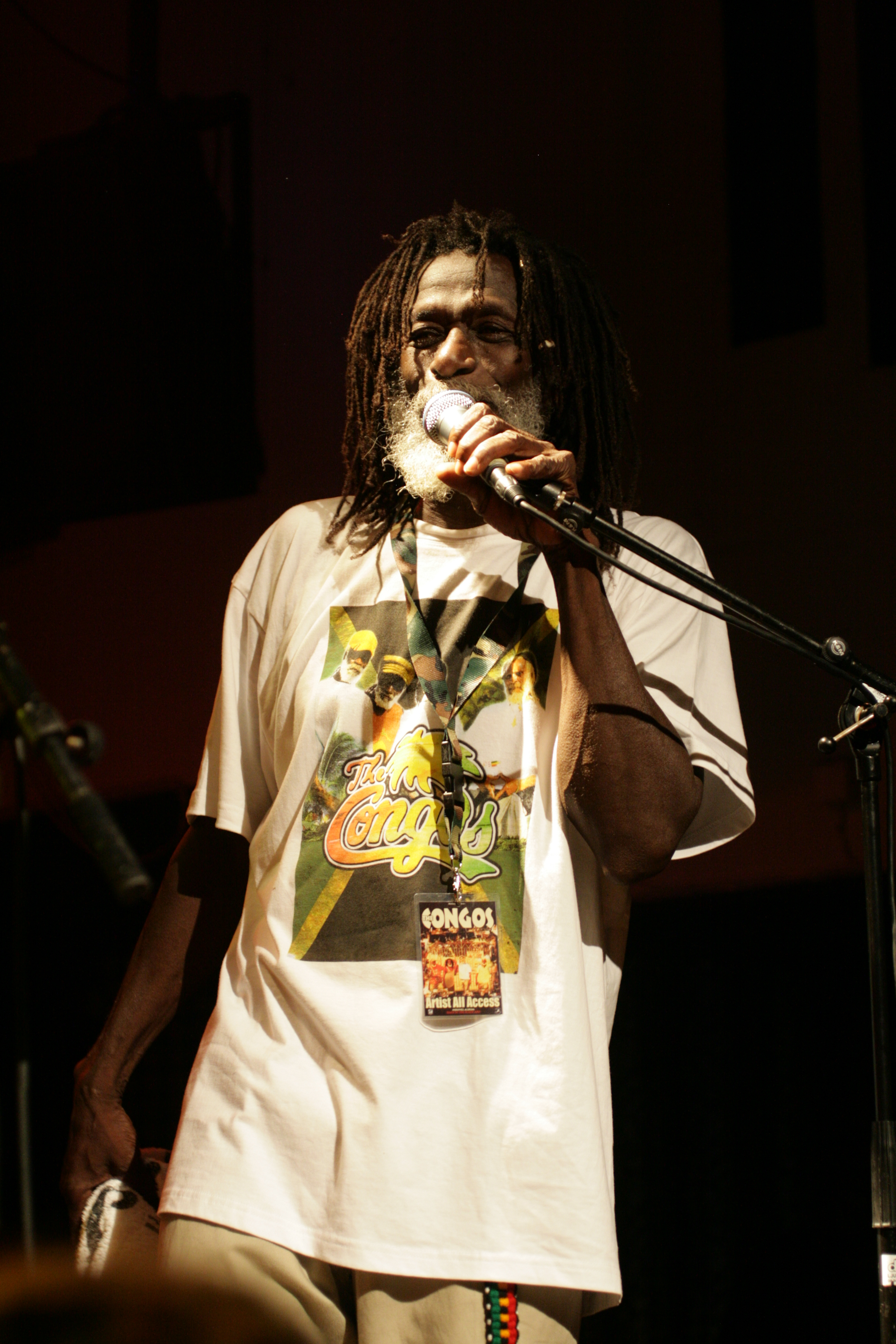
- Ashanti Roy performing in 2009

Background information
- Also known as: Congo Ashanti Roy
- Born: 12 April 1943 (age 83); Kendal, Hanover Parish, Jamaica
- Genre: Reggae
- Occupation: Singer-songwriter
- Instruments: Vocals, guitar
- Years active: 1971 – present
- Labels: Pre, Sonic Boom, Jah Power

Roydel Anthony Johnson (born 12 April 1943), better known as Congo Ashanti Roy is a Jamaican reggae singer best known as a member of The Congos but who also recorded solo and as a member of Ras Michael's Sons of Negus.

== Biography ==
Johnson was born in 1943 in Kendal, Hanover Parish, Jamaica, and attended Kendal School with Lee "Scratch" Perry, their mothers also being friends. At the age of sixteen he moved to Kingston to live with an aunt, and began hanging around recording studios, where he was taught guitar by Ernest Ranglin. In 1964 he was recruited to the US Peace Corps to work at the naval base in Guantanamo Bay, where he worked for the next five and a half years. In 1966 he took leave to return home for Haile Selassie's visit to Jamaica and became a committed Rastafarian from that point on. Being a family man Johnson always cared for his 7 children; Marie Johnson, Christopher Johnson, Miriam Johnson, Tamara Johnson, Negus Johnson, Coretta Johnson & Garet Johnson.

In the early 1970s, Johnson's ambitions turned once again to music and he hung around Kingston recording studios trying to get someone to record him. Lee Perry was the first to take a chance on him, although his version of "Standing on the Hill" was passed over in favour of that by Chenley Duffus. With nobody prepared to record him as a singer he concentrated on the guitar, and worked as a member of the Sons of Negus in the early 1970s, as well as The Righteous Brothers (led by Vivian "Yabby You" Jackson and also featuring Albert Griffiths of The Gladiators). In 1977 he met Perry again, who after hearing Johnson play "Row Fisherman Row", invited him to his Black Ark studio to record the song. Jackson arrived at the studio with Cedric Myton and they would record together as The Congos for the next few years, his tenor complementing Myton's falsetto.

When the Congos split up, Johnson began recording as Congo Ashanti Roy, and worked with Adrian Sherwood on his Singers & Players project and Prince Far I, the latter producing his debut solo album, Sign of the Star in 1980. Johnson contributed to Far I's Showcase in a Suitcase album the same year. A second album, Level Vibes, followed in 1984, this time produced by Sherwood.

In 1997 he rejoined Myton in the Congos for a live performance, and in 2002, he appeared on The Slackers' Slackers and Friends album along with Glen Adams, Cornell Campbell, and Ranking Joe. In 2003, Johnson moved into production and set up his own Lion's Den recording studio in Christian Pen, Gregory Park, St. Catherine, and his own Koto Koto Music label. In 2004, The Congos, including Johnson, announced plans to tour the world, and in 2006 they toured Europe and Asia.

== Discography ==
- Sign of the Star (1980) Pre
- Level Vibes (1984) Sonic Boom
- Big City (1994) Jah Power/Jet Star
- Light Up the City (1995) Jah Power
