= Humanity (Lincoln Thompson album) =

Studio album by Lincoln Thompson
- Released: 1979
- Genre: Reggae
- Label: Ballistic

Lincoln Thompson chronology
Experience (1979)	Humanity (1979)

Humanity is a reggae album released by The Royal Rasses featuring Prince Lincoln Thompson in 1979.

The album was listed in the 1999 book The Rough Guide: Reggae: 100 Essential CDs.

== Track listing ==
1. "San Salvador"
2. "They Know Not Jah"
3. "Old Time Friend"
4. "Unconventional People"
5. "Love (The Way It Should Be)"
6. "Henry Kissinger"
7. "Kingston II"

== Personnel ==
- Prince Lincoln Thompson - vocals
- Cedric Myton, Clinton Hall, Keith Peterkin - backing vocals
- Bagga, Val Douglas - bass
- Benbow, Leroy "Horsemouth" Wallace, Mikey Boo - drums
- Lennox Gordon, Wayne McGee, Willie Lindo - guitar
- Bobby Ellis, Herman Marquis, Tommy McCook, Vivian Hall - horns
- Cecil Lloyd, Earl "Wire" Lindo, Geoffrey Chung, Paul Dixon - keyboards

Mixed by - Sylvan Morris at Harry J's
Recorded at Channel One Studios and Dynamic Sounds, Kingston, Jamaica
