= Cry Tough =

Cry Tough may refer to:

- Cry Tough (Alton Ellis album), a 1993 album of Alton Ellis' work from 1966 to 1968
- Cry Tough (Nils Lofgren album), a 1976 album by Nils Lofgren
- "Cry Tough" (song), a 1986 single by the band Poison
- "Cry Tough", a 1966 single by Alton Ellis
- Cry Tough (film), a 1959 crime drama film
