= Roy Cousins =

Jamaican reggae singer

- Born: Roy Anthony Cousins; 1949 (age 76–77)
- Origin: Kingston, Jamaica
- Genres: Reggae, Conscious Roots Reggae, Dub
- Occupations: Singer, producer, and record label owner
- Instrument: Vocals

Roy Anthony Cousins (born 1949 in Kingston, Jamaica) is a Jamaican reggae singer, producer, and record label owner, known for being lead singer and co creator of The Royals, his productions of artists such as Charlie Chaplin, Prince Far I, Scientist, Winston Francis, Earl Sixteen, Devon Russell, Junior Reid, Don Carlos, Pablove Black, Ken Parker, Knowledge, The Gaylads, The Meditations, Prince Hammer and Cornell Campbell, and his record labels, Uhuru, Tamoki, Wambesi, Dove & Tamoki-Wambesi/Tamoki Wambesi Dove.

== Biography ==
Cousins worked for the Jamaican Post Office for many years after he left school, and had formed his first vocal group in 1962, to attend the Junior Festival Competition. In 1965 he formed a vocal group (The Royals), whose first release by Coxsone Dodd's Studio One label was put out under the name of The Tempests, and later as The Royals. Frustrated with his dealings with record labels, he started his own Uhuru label in 1969. This soon folded, but he returned with the Tamoki label in 1972 and the Wambesi label in 1974. He also began producing other artists, including Gregory Isaacs' "Way of Life" in 1974, which established the singer as a star.

In June 1977, Cousins left his Post Office job to concentrate full-time on music, resulting in 1978's Pick Up The Pieces album, a collection of tracks from Royals 1970s singles, which is now considered one of the great reggae albums. Its success led to a contract with Ballistic Records, licensed to United Artists, with two further Royals albums following. Cousins-produced dub albums also appeared (Freedom Fighters Dub and Liberated Dub).

In 1979, cataracts almost led to Cousins losing his sight. After recovering, Cousins began to concentrate on production, introducing the dancehall deejay Charlie Chaplin, as well as releasing a series of LPs and roots reggae vocal and dub Discomixes, producing artists such as Cornell Campbell's 45, Jah Give us Love in the Morning, Earl Sixteen, Naggo "Dolphin" Morris (also of The Heptones), and The Meditations with tracks such as "Stranger in Love" and "Unity". These releases were mostly backed by The Roots Radics and engineered by Scientist, with The Royals' "If You Want Good" and the Dove label Junior Reid 45 release "Oh Happy Day", in demand on Jah Shaka and Lloyd Coxsone sound systems in the UK.

Cousins produced Prince Far I's final album in 1983, Umkhonto We Sizwe, the chanter being fatally shot before it was finished. This prompted Cousins to emigrate to Liverpool, England, where he set up a record shop, Cousins Cove, and continues to release records on his Tamoki-Wambesi and Dove labels, both from his back-catalogue, and new recordings of visiting Jamaican artists. Another Cousins-produced track from this era is "Skanky Producer" which featured Charlie Chaplin and Black Uhuru singers Don Carlos and Junior Reid.
