= Pick Up the Pieces (album) =

Studio album by The Royals
- Released: 1977
- Recorded: Channel One Studios, Dynamic Sounds, King Tubby's, Randy's, Kingston, Jamaica, 1973-77
- Genre: Reggae
- Label: Magnum/Tamoki Wambesi/Ballistic/Pressure Sounds
- Producer: Roy Cousins

The Royals chronology
Pick Up the Pieces (1977)	Ten Years After (1978)

Tamoki Wambesi reissue
- Cover from the Tamoki Wambesi release.

Pressure Sounds reissue
- Cover from the Pressure Sounds release.

Professional ratings
Review scores
Source	Rating
Allmusic	4.5/5 stars
Record Mirror	4/5 stars

Pick Up the Pieces is the debut album from Jamaican roots reggae group The Royals, collecting recordings made between 1973 and 1977, and produced by Royals lead vocalist and only constant member Roy Cousins. Musicians on the album include members of The Wailers, Soul Syndicate, The In Crowd, and the Now Generation Band. The album was later licensed to United Artists subsidiary Ballistic Records, and was reissued in an expanded form in 2002 by Pressure Sounds. The songs on the album have been described as "some of the most musically sublime expressions of Rastafarian faith and the hardships of ghetto living Jamaica has produced".

== Track listing ==
=== Original Magnum (1977) and Ballistic (1978) releases ===
1. "Pick Up The Pieces"
2. "Ghetto Man"
3. "Jah Jah Knows"
4. "Sufferer Of The Ghetto"
5. "If I Were You"
6. "When You Are Wrong"
7. "Promised Land"
8. "Only For A Time"
9. "Blacker Black"
10. "Peace And Love"

=== 1980s Tamoki Wambesi release ===
1. "Pick Up The Pieces"
2. "Ghetto Man"
3. "Jah Jah Knows"
4. "Sufferer Of The Ghetto"
5. "If I Were You"
6. "If You Want Good"
7. "When You Are Wrong"
8. "Promised Land"
9. "Only For A Time"
10. "Blacker Black"
11. "Peace And Love"
12. "Facts Of Life"

=== 2002 Pressure Sounds CD release ===
1. "Pick Up The Pieces"
2. "Ghetto Man"
3. "Heart In Pain"
4. "Only Jah Knows"
5. "Sufferer Of The Ghetto"
6. "If I Were You"
7. "When You Are Wrong (Version 1)"
8. "When You Are Wrong (Version 2)"
9. "Promised Land"
10. "Message"
11. "Only For A Time"
12. "Genuine Way"
13. "Blacker Black"
14. "Peace And Love"
15. "Facts Of Life"
16. "If You Want Good"
17. "Make Believe (Version 1)"
18. "Make Believe (Version 2)"
19. "Leave Out Of Babylon"
20. "Down Comes The Rain"

== Personnel ==
- Engineer: Sid Bucknor, King Tubby, Errol Thompson, Ernest Hoo Kim, Dennis Thompson, Karl Pitterson, Carlton Lee
- Vocals: Roy Cousins, Errol Wilson, Keith Smith, Berthram Johnson
- Drums: Anthony "Ben Bow" Creary, Phil Callendar, Carlton "Santa" Davis, Leroy "Horsemouth" Wallace
- Bass guitar: Earl "Bagga" Walker, Robbie Shakespeare, Bertram Johnson, Aston Barrett, George "Fully" Fullwood
- Guitar: Geoffrey Chung, Noel "Sewell" Bailey, Lynford "Hux" Brown, Ernest Ranglin, Ranchie McLean, Albert Griffiths, Gits, Earl "Chinna" Smith
- Piano: Robert Lynn, Lloyd Charmers, Pablove Black, Bobby Kalphat, Gladstone Anderson, Bernard "Touter" Harvey
- Organ: Ossie Hibbert, Ansel Collins, Earl "Wire" Lindo, Winston Wright
- Horns: Vin Gordon, Tommy McCook, Bobby Ellis, Richard "Dirty Harry" Hall, Herman Marquis
