= Mr Soul of Jamaica =

Studio album by Alton Ellis
- Released: 1974
- Recorded: 1964–1970 at Treasure Isle Recording Studio, Kingston, Jamaica
- Genre: Rocksteady, Reggae
- Label: Treasure Isle
- Producer: Duke Reid

Alton Ellis chronology
Greatest Hits (1973)	Mr Soul of Jamaica (1974)	Still in Love (1977)

Alternate cover

Professional ratings
Review scores
Source	Rating
Allmusic	4.5/5 stars

Mr Soul of Jamaica is an album by Jamaican rocksteady singer Alton Ellis. It contains twelve tracks recorded between 1967 and 1970 at Duke Reid's Treasure Isle Recording Studios in Kingston, Jamaica and was produced by Reid and released on his Treasure Isle label in 1974. Although this was his only album for the label, Ellis had already been a star musician in Jamaica from the early 1960s onwards, having recorded for Coxsone Dodd's Studio One label before moving to Treasure Isle, and the album is a compilation of some of his Treasure Isle singles, although some of his biggest hits including "Rock Steady", "Girl I've Got a Date" and "Cry Tough" were left off it.

In May 2013 the album was reissued as an expanded 2-CD set titled Mr Soul of Jamaica/Greatest Hits, featuring the other singles Ellis recorded for Treasure Isle with his band the Flames from 1964 onwards, plus the extended disco mixes of some of the tracks that were released on Jamaica's High Note label in the 1970s.

== Track listing ==
All songs written and composed by Alton Nehemiah Ellis except where indicated.

=== Side one ===
1. "Breaking Up" – 3:02
2. "Why Birds Follow Spring" – 2:27
3. "I Can't Stop Now" – 3:24
4. "Ain't That Loving You" (Allen Avoid Jones Jr., Homer Banks) – 2:43
5. "You Make Me Happy" (Berry Gordy Jnr., Brenda Holloway, Frank Edward Wilson, Patrice Yvonne Holloway) – 2:55
6. "Remember That Sunday" (Ellis, Edgar Clinton Gordon, Winston Jarrett) – 2:55

=== Side two ===
1. "All My Tears Come Rolling" – 2:46
2. "Baby I Love You" – 2:21
3. "Chatty Chatty" – 2:22
4. "Willow Tree" (Robert Elgin, Kay Rogers, Luther Dixon) – 2:44
5. "If I Could Rule the World" – 2:29
6. "What Does It Take" (Harvey Fuqua, Johnny Bristol, Vernon Bullock) – 3:19
- Note: The original 1974 release of the album contains several errors in the track titles, which were corrected on the 2013 reissue.

=== 2013 Mr Soul of Jamaica/Greatest Hits 2-CD reissue ===
==== CD1 ====
1. "Breaking Up" – 2:57
2. "Why Birds Follow Spring" – 2:30
3. "I Can't Stop Now" – 3:20
4. "Ain't That Loving You" (Allen Avoid Jones Jr., Homer Banks) – 2:45
5. "You Made Me So Very Happy" (Berry Gordy Jnr., Brenda Holloway, Frank Edward Wilson, Patrice Yvonne Holloway) – 2:53
6. "Remember That Sunday" (Ellis, Edgar Clinton Gordon, Winston Jarrett) – 2:34
7. "All My Tears (Come Rolling)" – 2:40
8. "Baby I Love You (Oowee Baby)" – 2:26
9. "Chatty Chatty People" – 2:19
10. "My Willow Tree" (Robert Elgin, Kay Rogers, Luther Dixon) – 2:41
11. "If I Could Rule the World" – 2:23
12. "What Does It Take (To Win Your Love)" (Harvey Fuqua, Johnny Bristol, Vernon Bullock) – 3:16

Bonus tracks:

13. "Why Did You Leave Me" (Barry Llewellyn, Earl Morgan, Leroy Anthony Sibbles) – 2:36
14. "I Can't Stand It" (Gloria Rose) – 2:40
15. "La La Means I Love You" (Thomas Randolph Bell, William A. Hart) – 3:07
16. "Diana" (Paul Anka) – 2:36
17. "Personality" (Harold Logan, Lloyd Price) – 2:08
18. "Trying to Reach My Goal" (Edward S. Thomas Jr.) – 2:14
19. "Pumping In" – 2:36
20. "Black Man's Word" – 2:48

==== CD2 ====
1. "Something You've Got" (Chris Kenner) – 2:37
2. "Dance Crasher" (Ellis, Gordon, Jarrett) – 2:38
3. "A – You're Adorable" (Buddy Kaye, Fred Wise, Sidney Lippman) – 2:41
4. "Honey I Love" – 2:59
5. "Don't Trouble People" – 2:56
6. "The Preacher" – 2:11
7. "Blessings of Love" – 2:24
8. "Shake It" – 2:44
9. "Girl I've Got a Date" (Ellis, Coxsone Dodd) – 2:28
10. "How Can I" (John Kenneth Holt) – 2:52
11. "Cry Tough" (Ellis, Gordon, Jarrett) – 2:13
12. "Rock Steady" (Ellis, Brian Anthony Burrell Atkinson) – 2:57
13. "Duke of Earl" (Bernice Williams, Earl G. Edwards Sr., Eugene Drake Dixon) – 3:19

Bonus tracks:

14. "Breaking Up" (Extended Mix) – 6:05
15. "I Can't Stop Now" (Extended Mix) – 5:23
16. "You Make Me Happy" (Extended Mix) (Gordy, B. Holloway, P. Holloway, Wilson) – 7:02
17. "Remember That Sunday" (Extended Mix) (Ellis, Gordon, Jarrett) – 3:54
18. "Baby I Love You (Oowee Baby)" (Extended Mix) – 6:08
19. "If I Could Rule the World" (Extended Mix) – 6:09
20. "I Can't Stand It" (Extended Mix) (Rose) – 6:48

== Personnel ==
- Alton Ellis – vocals
- The Flames – backing vocals
- Tommy McCook & the Supersonics – instrumental backing
- Duke Reid – production
- Errol Brown, Carlton Hamil – engineering
