= List of people from Port Antonio, Jamaica =

This is a list of notable people who are from Port Antonio, Jamaica, or have spent a large part or formative part of their career in that city.

== B ==
- Albert Ernest "Bean" Backus, famous American landscape painter had a studio/home on the banks of the Priestman's River, just up the road from Dragon's Head Point.

Edward Baugh, poet and scholar, recognised as an authority on the work of Derek Walcott

- Trevor Berbick, former heavyweight boxer and champion
- Martine Beswick, actress
- Watty Burnett, reggae singer

== C ==
- Maurice Chambers, cricketer

== D ==
- Leonard Dillon ( 1942 – 2011), lead singer of foundation ska-rocksteady-reggae group The Ethiopians
- Mikey Dread, singer, producer and broadcaster
- Archibald Dunkley, street preacher and one of the first preachers of the Rastafari movement in Jamaica
- Dillian Whyte, professional boxer

== F ==
- Errol Flynn, screen actor

== G ==
- Amy Ashwood Garvey, Pan-Africanist activist and the first wife of Marcus Garvey

== H ==
- Donna Hylton, murderer and kidnapper

== J ==
- Merrecia James, track and field middle distance athlete

== K ==
- King Sporty, DJ, reggae musician, and record producer

== L ==
- Michael Lee-Chin, investor and the founder and Chairman of Portland Holdings Inc.

== M ==
- Junior Murvin, reggae singer

== O ==
- Dever Orgill, footballer, St Georges SC, Jamaica

== R ==
- John Brown Russwurm, abolitionist
