= Devon Russell =

- Born: Devon Barrant Russell; 6 August 1948
- Died: 18 June 1997 (aged 49)
- Genres: Rocksteady, reggae
- Occupations: Singer, record producer
- Years active: Mid-1960s–1997

Devon Russell (6 August 1948 – 18 June 1997) was a Jamaican rocksteady and reggae singer and record producer who recorded between the 1960s and the 1990s, both as a solo artist and as a member of The Tartans and Cultural Roots.

== Biography ==
Russell's career began in the 1960s with the Tartans, a group which also included Prince Lincoln Thompson, Linbergh "Preps" Lewis, and Cedric Myton. When the Tartans disbanded, Russell embarked on a solo career, and for a time joined Cultural Roots as lead singer. He also recorded with Myton as Devon & Cedric. In the mid-1970s, Russell recorded 11 songs for Lee "Scratch" Perry that were never released. In the early 1980s he recorded for Clement "Coxsone" Dodd's Studio One label, and his debut solo album, Roots Music, was produced by Dodd and released on Sweet Music Records in 1982. In 1983 he was asked to join The Congos for a European tour, and he eventually relocated to the United Kingdom. He moved on to work with Roy Cousins on his second album, Prison Life. In the early 1990s he worked with Zion Train and Skaville Train. In 1996 his fourth album, Darker Than Blue, was a tribute to Curtis Mayfield wholly comprising Mayfield cover versions.

His productions include Big Youth's 1978 album Isaiah First Prophet of the Old.

Russell died from a brain tumour on 18 June 1997 a year after the release of Darker Than Blue.

== Discography ==
- Roots Music (1982) Studio One
- Prison Life Tamoki Wambesi
- This Cloak and Dagger (1988) World Enterprise
- Rougher Yet (1989) Greensleeves (with The Cultural Roots)
- Money Sex & Violence (1991) Runn (Devon Russell & the Cultural Roots)
- Devon Russell Sings Roots Classics (1993) Universal Egg (with Zion Train)
- Bible and the Gun (1996) Fire House
- Darker Than Blue (1996) House of Reggae
- 3 The Hard Way Roots (1996) Uptempo (with Willi Williams and Nitty Gritty)
- Showcase (2003) Reggae Retro (with Skaville Train)
- Home Bound Train P-Vine
