= Sunday Coming =

Studio album by Alton Ellis
- Released: 1970
- Recorded: 1969–1970
- Studio: Jamaica Recording Studio, Kingston, Jamaica
- Genre: Rocksteady, Reggae
- Length: 44:02
- Label: Coxsone
- Producer: Coxsone Dodd

Alton Ellis chronology
The Best Of (1969)	Sunday Coming (1970)	Greatest Hits (1973)

CD reissue cover

Professional ratings
Review scores
Source	Rating
AllMusic	4.5/5 stars

Sunday Coming is a 1970 album by Jamaican rocksteady singer Alton Ellis. It was produced by Clement "Coxsone" Dodd and recorded at his Brentford Road studio. The album was originally released on Dodd's Coxsone label and subsequently reissued on CD in 1995 on Heartbeat Records.

== Track listing ==
All songs written by Coxsone Dodd and Alton Ellis, except where noted

1. "Joy in the Morning" (Coxsone Dodd, B.B. Seaton, Delano Stewart) – 4:04
2. "Sunday Coming" – 2:23
3. "These Eyes" (Randy Bachman, Burton Cummings) – 2:51
4. "Hurting Me" – 2:25
5. "It's True" – 2:45
6. "Alton's Groove" – 2:02
7. "What Does It Take to Win Your Love" (Johnny Bristol, Vernon Bullock, Harvey Fuqua) – 2:59
8. "The Picture Was You" – 3:01
9. "Gonna Take a Miracle" – 2:14
10. "Your Heart Is Gonna Pay" – 2:58
11. "Wide Awake in a Dream" (Bob Crewe, Bob Gaudio) – 2:49
12. "You Make Me So Very Happy" (Berry Gordy, Brenda Holloway, Patrice Holloway, Frank Wilson) – 3:07
13. "Reason in the Sky" – 3:03

== Release history ==
Label	Year	Format	Catalog
Coxsone	1970	LP	#PSOL 3423
Bamboo	1971	LP	#BDLPS 214
Heartbeat	1995	CD	#CDHB 3511
