= Experience (Lincoln Thompson album) =

Studio album by Lincoln Thompson and the Royal Rasses
- Released: 1979
- Genre: Reggae
- Label: Vista Sounds
- Producer: Prince Lincoln Thompson

Experience is a reggae album by Lincoln Thompson and the Royal Rasses released in 1979 and recorded in Jamaica. The songs were dedicated to Bintia Thompson.

The Huddersfield Daily Examiner commented that Thompson successfully created a version of disco reggae for "wider, popular consumption", but in the process ended up with "bland music" that acts as "revolution and slavery hygienically shrink-wrapped in polythene."

== Track listing ==
All tracks composed by Lincoln Thompson

1. "Nobody Here But Me"
2. "Blessed Are The Meek"
3. "Slave Driver"
4. "You Gotta Have Love (Jah Love)"
5. "Babylon Is Falling"
6. "True Experience"
7. "For Once In My Life"
8. "Walk In Jah Light"
9. "Jungle Fever"
10. "Thanksgiving"

== Personnel ==
- Prince Lincoln Thompson - guitar, vocals
- Ernest Ranglin, Diggles, George Miller - guitar
- Errol "Bagga" Walker, Val Douglas - bass
- Leroy "Horsemouth" Wallace, Mikey Booth - drums
- "Deadly" Headley Bennett, Bobby Ellis, Frankie Bubbler, Tommy McCook - horns
- Earl "Wire" Lindo, Pablo Black, Cecil Lloyd, Geoffrey Chung - keyboards
- Clinton Hall, Keith Peterkin - background vocals
- Brother Jamo, Uziah "Sticky" Thompson - percussion

Mixed by Sylvan Morris at Harry J. Studio
