= Same Song (disambiguation) =

"Same Song" is a 1991 song by Digital Underground.

Same Song or The Same Song may also refer to:

- The Same Song, a program of the China Central Television music channel
- "Same Song", a song by Llama Farmers, 2000
- "Same Song", a song by LaKisha Jones from So Glad I'm Me
- The Same Song, an album by Israel Vibration, 1978
- "The Same Song", a song by Alton Ellis from Cry Tough
