= The Tartans =

Jamaican reggae band

The Tartans, also known as Devon and the Tartans, were a rocksteady group who came together in 1967 in Kingston, Jamaica. The members were initially Prince Lincoln Thompson, Cedric Myton, Devon Russell and Lindberg Lewis. Myton and Russell had previously been in a group called the Bellstars. The Tartans formed as a result of the Bellstars break-up.

Their recorded output included "Far Beyond the Sun" for Duke Reid's Treasure Isle label, "Dance All Night", "What Can I Say", and six tracks recorded for Ken Lack's Caltone label: "Awake The Town", "Coming on Strong", "It's Alright", "Making Love", "Save a Little Bread" and "Solid as a Rock".

"Lonely Heartaches" by The Clarendonians was incorrectly credited to 'The Tartons' [sic] when released in the UK on Crab.

After the group split, Thompson went on to form The Royal Rasses and Myton The Congos.

No studio albums were released by The Tartans. Cedric Myton has stated that he intends to produce an album with songs from The Tartans. On the Roots Reggae Library two albums with songs from the Tartans were composed. One derives its name from their hit "Dance All Night", and another is titled "Awake The Town".
