= In Search of the Lost Riddim =

Studio album by Ernest Ranglin
- Released: 1998
- Length: 70:14
- Label: Palm Pictures
- Producer: Ernest Ranglin, Ira Coleman, Bart Fermie

Ernest Ranglin chronology
Memories of Barber Mack (1997)	In Search of the Lost Riddim (1998)	Soul D'Ern (1999)

In Search of the Lost Riddim is an album by the Jamaican musician Ernest Ranglin, released in 1998. It was among the first releases from Chris Blackwell's Palm Pictures label; Blackwell's Island Records had signed Ranglin in the 1950s. The album title refers to Ranglin's decades-long absence from making music in Africa. Ranglin supported the album by playing North American shows with Baaba Maal. The album was a success on the Specialist albums chart in the United Kingdom.

== Production ==
Recorded in Dakar, Senegal, with members of Maal's band, the album was produced by Ranglin, Ira Coleman, and Bart Fermie. Ranglin wrote three of the 11 songs. Maal sang on "Minuit" and "Haayo"; Maal and Mansour Seck also played guitar. Dion Parson played drums on the tracks. A balafon was used on a few tracks, as were koras and tamas.

== Critical reception ==
Professional ratings
Review scores
Source	Rating
The Age	4/5 stars
AllMusic	4/5 stars
The Encyclopedia of Popular Music	4/5 stars
Houston Press	4/5 stars
MusicHound World: The Essential Album Guide	3.5/5 stars
Orlando Sentinel	4.5/5 stars

Orlando Weekly called the album "an intoxicating aural bath that matches Ranglin's eclectic six-string leads and fills and the steady bass work of Ira Coleman with traditional percussion and string instruments and luxurious chanting and singing." The Guardian deemed it "a gently rhythmic, refreshingly original and contemporary-sounding fusion that is both joyful, subtle, and remarkably classy." The Sydney Morning Herald considered it "a beautifully recorded album—an all-acoustic session using just percussion, stringed instruments and vocals—with the relaxed, celebratory atmosphere of musicians reaching across the diaspora to find common ground."

The Financial Times labeled In Search of the Lost Riddim "a lovely, sunny sound, all tinkling guitars and delicious variations of rhythm." Newsday wrote that "Ranglin's fat, juicy notes on his electric guitar blend in perfectly with the acoustic accompaniment of the Senegalese musicians." The Observer noted that "the music is filled with Ranglin's melodious warmth and easy good nature."

AllMusic wrote that "the English bass and drums style gets all mixed up here with reggae and Afro-pop, resulting in a scintillating dance party."

== Track listing ==
In Search of the Lost Riddim track listing
No.	Title	Length
1.	"D'accord Dakar"	4:35
2.	"Up on the Downstroke"	4:37
3.	"Minuit"	8:57
4.	"Ala Walee"	6:23
5.	"Cherie"	5:52
6.	"Haayo"	10:16
7.	"Anna"	4:12
8.	"Nuh True"	6:17
9.	"Wouly"	6:05
10.	"Pili Pili"	5:44
11.	"Midagny"	7:16
Total length:		70:14

== Charts ==
Chart performance for In Search of the Lost Riddim
Chart (1999)	Peak position
Australian Albums (ARIA)	85
