= Lincoln Thompson =

- Also known as: Sax
- Born: 10 July 1949; Kingston, Jamaica
- Died: 14 January 1999 (aged 49) London, England
- Genre: Reggae
- Formerly of: Royal Rasses

Prince Lincoln Thompson, known as Sax (10 July 1949 in Jonestown, Kingston, Jamaica – 14 January 1999 in London, England), was a Jamaican singer, musician and songwriter with the reggae band the Royal Rasses, and a member of the Rastafari movement. He was noted for his high falsetto singing voice, very different from his spoken voice.

== Career ==
He began his recording career as a harmony singer along with Cedric Myton of The Congos in 1967, in a band called The Tartans, who then split up in 1969. In 1971 he was taken on by Coxsone Dodd, and recorded three songs with him at Studio One called "Daughters of Zion", "True Experience" and "Live Up to Your Name". In 1974, he recorded the Humanity album with Cedric Myton, Clinton Hall and Keith Peterkin, and set up the God Sent label. He had two hit singles with "Kingston 11" and "Love the Way It Should Be".

In 2010, the song, "Humanity (Love the Way It Should Be)" was covered by the American singer John Legend backed by the Philadelphia band, The Roots, and was featured on Legend's album, Wake Up!.

Prince Lincoln received a record deal in 1978, he was signed up by Mo Claridge, who at the time ran Ballistics Records, a London offshoot of United Artists, and who noticed his "eerie falsetto". A single "Unconventional People" was released as a 12-inch single in March 1979 with the Humanity album following in May. In mid 1979, the Royal Rasses recorded a second Prince Lincoln album, Experience, this time without Cedric Myton. This album contained more than just the traditional drum and bass sound of most reggae. The band renamed themselves the Rasses to avoid confusion with fellow reggae band The Royals to record a further album called Natural Wild in 1980. This time the music was recorded in London. Prince Lincoln's decision to invite English rock musician Joe Jackson was controversial, and the album was a commercial flop.

Thompson returned to Jamaica and re-set up the successful God Sent label, with the help of German company Juicy Peeple to produce his fourth album, Ride with the Rasses in 1982. This music was recorded at Tuff Gong and Channel One studios. Around this time he and his family moved to Tottenham, London, England, where he opened an Ital shop called The Rasses Fish Mart and Grocery Store. In September 1983, he recorded Rootsman Blues in Addis Ababa Studio in London. It was released by Target Records with only three musicians per track, giving the music the intimate quality of chamber music.

He released a final album, 21st Century in 1997 after someone from the United States heard the music in Prince Lincoln's shop, and agreed to become a sponsor. This final album was also recorded in London.

Thompson died in January 1999, in London, at the age of 49.

== Discography ==
=== Singles ===
- "Daughters of Zion" (1971)
- "True Experience" (1971)
- "Live Up to Your Name" (1971)

=== Albums ===
- Humanity 1979
- Experience 1979 (The lyrics from "Walk in Jah light" and "Thanksgiving" have been used to explain the doctrine of physical immortality at Rastafari movement).
- Harder na Rass 1979
- Natural Wild 1980
- Ride with the Rasses 1982
- Rootsman Blues 1983 (also titled Unite The World)
- 21st Century 1997
