= The Meditations =

Jamaican musical group

- Origin: Jamaica
- Genres: Roots reggae, lovers rock, dancehall, dub
- Years active: 1974–present
- Members: Ansel Cridland; Laury Webb; Daddy Lion Chandell
- Past members: Danny Clarke; Winston Watson; Milton Henry

The Meditations are a spiritual, conscious roots reggae vocal harmony group from Jamaica formed in late 1974, who have released several studio albums and were still performing in the 2000s and up to the present day.

== History ==
The Meditations were formed in 1974, by Ansel Cridland (formerly from The Linkers) and Danny Clarke (formerly from Winston Jarrett's The Righteous Flames) and Winston Watson. After releasing singles credited to the individual members, they began recording as The Meditations in late 1976, shortly after which they released their biggest hit, "Woman Is Like a Shadow", which sold over 45,000 copies in its first month of release. They recorded in the mid-1970s for producers such as Dobby Dobson, Channel One Studios' Joseph Hoo Kim, and Lee "Scratch" Perry, their spiritually conscious and righteous Rastafarian style gaining comparisons with The Mighty Diamonds.

Their first album, Message From The Meditations, was released in 1976, attracting attention amongst the conscious roots reggae sound system fraternity with rockers compositions like "Babylon Trap Them" and the Lee Perry Black Ark produced tune, "Rastaman Prayer", urging the listener to shun society's consumerism and hypocritical economic materialism. The Lee Perry produced track "There Must be a First Time" reflects on the concept and praxis of 'Do Unto Others' delineated in The Golden Rule of Luke 6:31 and Matthew 7:12, and to strive to 'Know thyself'. Robert Christgau called the album "a nice one" in Christgau's Record Guide (1981), highlighting the "island chauvinism" of songs like "Running from Jamaica", which "gets on those who emigrate to Canada, Britain, the States, and Africa".

The Meditations sang backing vocals on a number of Bob Marley songs, including "Blackman Redemption", "Rastaman Live Up", and "Punky Reggae Party", a single released in 1977 in response to the surge of interest in revolutionary roots reggae and dub at the time amongst England's punk rock fraternity.The Meditations also provided backing for Gregory Isaacs, Jimmy Cliff and The Congos on their Heart of the Congos album, later re-released on Steve Barrow's Blood and Fire record label.

In 1977 and 1978, they recorded a number of Discomix vocal and dubs for Lee "Scratch" Perry at the Black Ark Studio, including Nyabinghi rhythm-led "Houses of Parliament", "Life Is Not Easy", "No Peace" and "Much Smarter", all of which attracted significant attention from the roots reggae conscious rockers sound system fraternity in Jamaica and in England, where they were played by Jah Shaka and Lloyd Coxsone's sound. The Meditations also released singles on Bunny Lee's 'Third World' label, amongst them, "Turn Me Loose", which was twinned with a 'B' side from Johnny Clarke, who provided a rockers' flying cymbals cover version of Coxsone Dodd's Mad Lad's Studio One take of the "Ten To One" tune, a composition originally written and recorded by The Impressions, a gospel, R&B, doo-wop, and soul vocal trio.

The Meditations also appeared at the One Love Peace Concert in April 1978, officially a commemoration of the 12th anniversary of Haile Selassie's state visit to Jamaica, but more famous for the handshake between Michael Manley and Edward Seaga when they joined Bob Marley on stage.

By 1981, they were releasing Roots Radics and Scientist backed music on Roy Cousins' Tamoki-Wambesi label, a highpoint being the successful lovers rock infused "Stranger in Love" Discomix, backed by the more conscious "Unity", which maintained interest in their work amongst the serious roots reggae and dub audiences at home and abroad. The Meditations 1983 album, No More Friend, written and sung by Ansel, was produced by Linval Thompson and featured Errol Holt and Style Scott's band, The Roots Radics, and saw them adapting to the sparser, slower, early dancehall sound of the time.

While Cridland was in Jamaica due to an injury, Clarke and Watson recorded 1988's For The Good of Man without him. Upon his return to the US in 1993, they were reunited for Return of The Meditations. All three members by this time were based in the US - Clarke in Phoenix, Arizona, Watson in Seattle, Washington, and Cridland in New York City.

They have subsequently toured the United States and Europe. In 2015, they released the album Jah Always Find a Way, which featured Sly Dunbar (drums), Lloyd Parks (bass), Ansel Collins and Sidney Mills (keyboards), Dwight Pinkney and Willie Lindo (guitars), and Derrick Barnett (bass). As of 2011, the group's official lineup consists of Cridland, Laury Webb, and Daddy Lion Chandell.

Winston Watson died in New York on March 28, 2019.

Danny Clarke died on 27 July 2024.

== Discography ==
=== Albums ===
- Message From The Meditations (1977) Wild Flower (JA) / United Artists (UK & US)
- Wake Up (1978) Third World (UK) / Double-D (US/JA)
- Guidance (1979) Tad's/Guidance
- No More Friend (1983) Thompson Sound/Greensleeves
- For The Good of Man (1988) Greensleeves
- Return of The Meditations (1993) Sonic Sounds/Heartbeat
- Ghetto Knowledge (1999) Easy Star
- I Love Jah (2002) Wackies (recorded 1982)
- Stand In Love (2004) Meditations Music (US)
- Jah Always Find a Way (2015) Meditations Music (US)

==== Compilations ====
- Greatest Hits (1984) Shanachie (US) / Greensleeves (UK)
- Deeper Roots: The Best of The Meditations (1994) Heartbeat
- Reggae Crazy: Anthology 1971-1979 (1997) Nighthawk

==== Collaborations ====
- 10 Ft Ganja Plant -album: Bass Chalice -song: To Each (2005) ROIR
