= Watty Burnett =

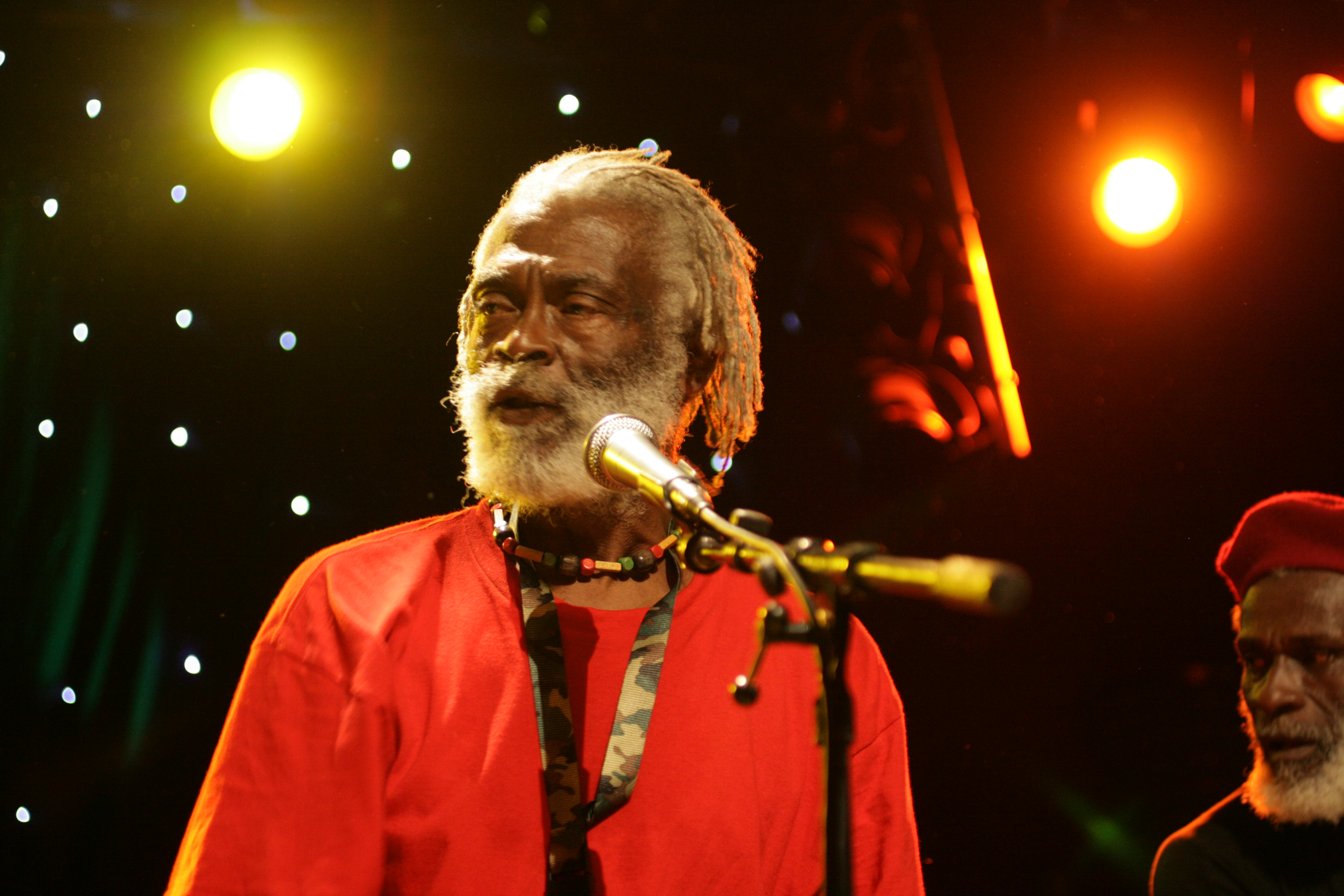
- Burnett performing in 2009

Background information
- Also known as: King Burnett
- Born: Derrick Burnett; 20 May 1948 (age 78); Port Antonio, Jamaica
- Genres: Reggae
- Occupations: Singer-songwriter, instrumentalist
- Instruments: Vocals, guitar, bass guitar, drums
- Years active: 1968–present
- Website: www.wattyb.com

Watty Burnett (born Derrick Burnett on 20 May 1948), also known as King Burnett, is a reggae artist who had a long association with Lee Perry.

== Biography ==
Burnett was born in Port Antonio, Jamaica and grew up in Port Antonio, the eldest of nine children, and learned to sing in the Baptist church his family attended. His nickname of "Watty" was given to him by childhood friend Murvin Smith Jr (aka Junior Soul), in reference to Burnett's prominent stutter as a child. Burnett formed a duo with Jimmy Nelson in the late 1960s, known alternately as The Soul Twins and Jimmy & Derrick, and they travelled to Kingston on Sundays, hoping to get a recording session. Although they were rejected by several producers (including Duke Reid who told them "You're too young, come back in five years"), Lee Perry saw potential in their song "Pound Get a Blow", a commentary on the attempts of Canada and the United States to replace the island's currency. The song was a moderate success in Jamaica in 1968, and placed in the Festival Song Contest. Burnett moved to the Allman Town district of Kingston, living with his brother Fitzy, and also recorded as "King Burnett" for Perry in late 1974, releasing "I Man Free" and "Babylon a Fall" under that name.

Burnett became a regular session vocalist and instrumentalist (drums, percussion and bass guitar) for Perry at his Black Ark studio, and recorded singles in his own right for the producer, with "Rise and Shine", "Open The Gate", which became the title track of a Trojan Records collection of Perry productions, and his biggest hit, "Rainy Night In Portland" (a version of Brook Benton's "Rainy Night in Georgia"). When The Congos began working with Perry, he added Burnett to the group in 1977 to add baritone to the harmonies, as he was aiming to record a classic falsetto-tenor-baritone group. Burnett sang on seven tracks on the Heart of the Congos album, and also contributed mooing noises, recorded earlier by Perry, who got Burnett to moo down a cardboard tube from a roll of tin foil, and these sounds were also used on other Black Ark recordings. The Congos left Perry after a dispute over the release of the Heart of the Congos album, but after recording another Congos album, Burnett returned to Perry. He continued working as a session vocalist, providing baritone on Jimmy Cliff's reworking of "Bongo Man" on the Give Thankx album, and backing vocals on Bob Marley's Exodus album. Burnett rejoined Cedric Myton in the Congos in the 1990s, releasing the Revival album.

Burnett released his first solo album proper, To Hell and Back, in 2002.

== Discography ==
=== Studio albums ===
- Megawatt Dub (1997) Shanachie (dubs of Burnett tracks, credited to Lee Perry & King Tubby)
- To Hell and Back (2002) Wajesskow Music Connection
- Rasta at Di Kontrol (2010), World Beat

=== Singles ===
- "Dash It Pon Him" (1974)
- "I Man Free" (as King Burnett) (1974)
- "Babylon a Fall" (as King Burnett) (1974)
- "Rise and Shine" (with Clinton Fearon) (197?)
- "What a War" Micron (Watty and Tony) (1974)
- "Perfidia" (Watty Burnett & Cultured Stars) (1975)
- "Open The Gate" (1978)
- "Rainy Night In Portland" (1977)
- "Too Late/Come By Yah" Rhythm Force (1981)
- "Dancin' Shoes" (1982)

=== Appeared on ===
- A Live Injection (Produced by Lee Perry) Song : "Rainy Night in Portland"
