= What Does It Take (to Win Your Love) =

- Solid centre variant of the UK single

Single by Jr. Walker & the All Stars

from the album Home Cookin'
- B-side: "Brainwasher (Part 1)"
- Released: 25 April 1969
- Recorded: Hitsville U.S.A.
- Genre: Soul
- Length: 2:26
- Label: Tamla Motown; TMG 712
- Songwriters: Johnny Bristol, Harvey Fuqua and Vernon Bullock
- Producers: Harvey Fuqua & Johnny Bristol

Jr. Walker & the All Stars singles chronology
| "Home Cookin'" (1968) | "What Does It Take (to Win Your Love)" (1969) | "These Eyes" (1968) |

"What Does It Take (to Win Your Love)" is a 1968 song that was a 1969 hit single by Jr. Walker & the All Stars.

== Background and history ==
The single was one of Jr. Walker's most successful releases, becoming a hit on both the R&B and pop singles charts. "What Does It Take (to Win Your Love)," was written by Johnny Bristol, Harvey Fuqua, and Vernon Bullock. It peaked at number four on the Billboard Hot 100 the week of August 9, 1969, and became Jr. Walker's second #1 on the R&B charts. The song was also a hit in the UK in 1969, reaching #13 on the UK Singles Chart. It remained in the chart for 12 weeks. The song was voted Top US Soul Record of 1969 and has sold over a million copies. Its extended intro and saxophone solo have influenced the works of David Sanborn, Clarence Clemons and Bobby Keys. It was nominated for the Grammy Award for Best R&B Instrumental Performance.

Canadian group Motherlode recorded the song which was the B side of their 1969 single, "Memories of a Broken Promise". Both sides charted in the US. The A side peaked at #99 on the Cash Box Top 100 Singles chart, and #116 on the Billboard Bubbling Under Hot 100 chart. The B side, "What Does It Take (to Win Your Love)" peaked at #111 on the Bubbling Under Hot 100 chart. Alton Ellis also covered the song on his 1974 album Mr Soul of Jamaica. Many sources give the release date for this album as 1967. Others, such as AllMusic, question the year of release. The version released as a single is dated 1970. In 1986 instrumentalist Kenny G (with Ellis Hall on vocals) covered this tune on his 1986 album "Duotones". The song appears on the 1982 album Shangó by Santana.

== Personnel ==
- Lead vocals and tenor sax solos by Junior Walker
- Harmony vocals by Johnny Bristol
- Backing vocals by The Andantes and The Originals
- Other instrumentation by The All-Stars with members of The Funk Brothers and the Detroit Symphony Orchestra

== Chart history ==
| Chart (1969) | Peak position |
|---|---|
| U.S. Billboard Hot 100 | 4 |
| U.S. Cash Box Top 100 | 5 |
| U.S. Billboard Hot Black Singles | 1 |
| UK Singles Chart | 13 |
