= André Toussaint =

- Born: Haiti
- Genres: Calypso
- Occupation: Musician
- Instruments: Vocals, guitar
- Years active: Early 1950s–1981

André Toussaint was a Haitian singer and guitarist who emigrated to Nassau, Bahamas in 1953 and performed there until his death in 1981. He sang and recorded in several languages and in a variety of styles, most notably calypso.

== Discography ==
=== Albums ===
- Andre Toussaint Sings at Blackbeard's Tavern (1954), Art Records
- Andre Toussaint and "the Caribbeans" (1956), Bahama
- Live at La Fin (1959), Art Records
- The Golden Voice of Haiti: André Toussaint Goes International, Elite
- Treasured Moments with Andre Toussaint
- Bahamian Ballads (2002), Naxos

=== Multi-artist compilations ===
- Nassau's Junkanoo Festival (1956), Bahama
- Calypso: Vintage Songs from the Caribbean (2002), Putumayo
- Mirror to the Soul: Music, Culture and Identity in the Caribbean, 1920–72 (2013), Soul Jazz. Includes "Nassau Cha Cha".
