= Natural Wild =

Studio album by Lincoln Thompson and the Rasses
- Released: 1980
- Recorded: Basing Street, London
- Genre: Roots reggae
- Label: United Artists
- Producers: Joe Jackson, Lincoln Thomson

Natural Wild is a reggae album by Jamaican artist Lincoln Thompson and the Rasses released in 1980 and recorded in the United Kingdom. Joe Jackson collaborated on the album whose central theme was the promotion of the culture and morality of the Rastafari movement. Commercially the album was a flop in spite of widespread publicity for it in the UK, in contrast to Thompson's two previous albums.

The Harlow Star called the album "beautiful", noting its features of "strong, hard pulsing bass lines, insistent, probing drumming, lyrical guitar and excellent vocals."

== Track listing ==
1. "Mechanical Devices"
2. "Natural Wild"
3. "My Generation"
4. "Natural (Reprise)"
5. "Spaceship"
6. "People's Minds"
7. "People Love Jah Music"
8. "Smiling Faces"

== Personnel ==
- Lincoln Thompson - guitar, vocals
- Gary Sanford, Dougie Bryan, Willie Lindo - guitar
- Bertram "Ranchie" McLean, Graham Maby - bass
- Dave Houghton, Michael "Boo" Richards - drums
- Joe Jackson - grand piano, organ, melodica
- Ansel Collins - keyboards
- George Oban, Mo Claridge - percussion
- Tony Gad - synthesizer on "Spaceship"
- Chris Lane - dub sound effects
- Norman Mighell - engineer
