= The Congos =

Jamaican band

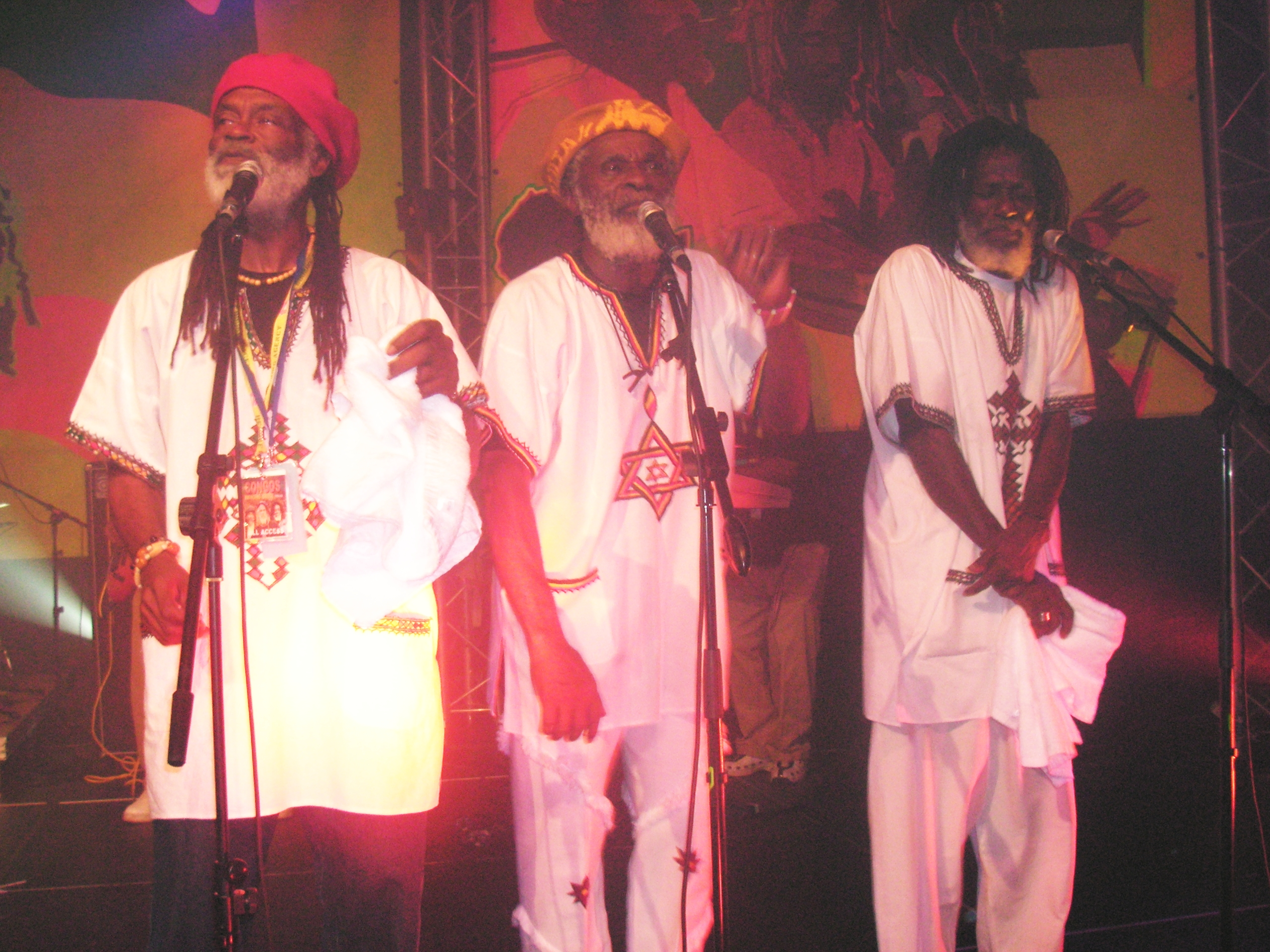
- The Congos in concert in Chartres, France in 2006

Background information
- Origin: Jamaica
- Genres: Roots reggae, dub
- Label: Go-Feet Records
- Members: Roydel Johnson; Cedric Myton; Watty Burnett; Kenroy Ffyffe
- Past members: Lindburgh Lewis; Devon Russell

The Congos are a Jamaican reggae vocal group from Jamaica which formed as the duo "Ashanti" Roy Johnson (tenor) (b. Roydel Johnson, 1947, Hanover, Jamaica) and Cedric Myton (falsetto) (b. 1947, Saint Catherine Parish, Jamaica), later becoming a trio with the addition of Watty Burnett (baritone) (b. early 1950s, Port Antonio, Jamaica), and have been active on and off from the mid-1970s until the present day. They are best known for their Heart of the Congos album, recorded with Lee "Scratch" Perry.

== History ==
Myton had previously been a member of the Tartans in the late 1960s (along with Prince Lincoln Thompson, Devon Russell and Lindburgh Lewis), and Ras Michael's group, and had recorded with Thompson's Royal Rasses in the mid-1970s. He formed the Congos, initially as a duo with Johnson, and they recorded the single "At the Feast" for Lee "Scratch" Perry. During sessions at Perry's Black Ark studio, Perry expanded the duo into a trio by adding baritone singer Watty Burnett to complement Myton's falsetto and Johnson's tenor. According to Lloyd Bradley, Perry treated the three voices as additional instruments within the arrangements and mixes rather than as the music's central element. This line-up recorded the roots reggae album Heart of the Congos in 1977. The album featured backing singers such as Gregory Isaacs, the Meditations, and Barry Llewellyn and Earl Morgan of the Heptones. The album has been described as "the most consistently brilliant album of Scratch's entire career".

Perry's previous productions by Max Romeo and Junior Murvin had been commercial successes thanks to a deal with Island Records, but Perry was in dispute with Island at the time the Congos' album was finished, so it was released on his own Black Ark label, limiting its success overseas and causing a rift with the group. The Congos went their own way, organising a limited pressing of the album themselves. United Kingdom label Go Feet eventually reissued the album in 1980, and although the group had recorded new material since leaving Perry, Heart of the Congos proved a hard act to follow and their other releases suffered as a consequence. Albums such as Congo Ashanti were sparser and sounded ordinary compared to Perry's kitchen-sink-and-all style of production.

Burnett quit the group, soon followed by Johnson, who embarked on a solo career. Myton continued to record as The Congos with various other musicians until the mid-1980s.

In the mid-1990s, The Congos reformed, with Myton and Burnett joined by Lindburgh Lewis, with several albums following in subsequent years. In 2002, they appeared on the album The Slackers and Friends by the ska/reggae band The Slackers. In 2005, Myton recorded Give Them the Rights with a host of backing singers and session players such as Sly and Robbie and Earl "Chinna" Smith, in the spiritual 1970s roots vein. In 2006, the UK reggae revival label Blood and Fire released the album Fisherman Style featuring a remixed version of the classic cut "Fisherman" from Heart of the Congos plus such musicians as Horace Andy, Big Youth, Dillinger, Prince Jazzbo, Luciano, Freddie McGregor, Gregory Isaacs, Max Romeo, Mykal Rose, Dean Fraser, Sugar Minott, and U-Roy doing their own new versions over the original rhythm.

In 2008, The Congos appeared in the independent feature film, Wah Do Dem which captures them performing "Fisherman," and "Congoman Chant," under a full moon at Helshire Beach outside Kingston.

In 2009, Myton, Burnett, and Johnson reunited with Perry to record the album Back in the Black Ark, which, despite its title, was recorded at Myton's studio in Portmore and at Mixing Lab, Kingston.

== Discography ==
Albums

- Heart of the Congos (1977) Black Ark
- Congo aka Congo Ashanti (1979) Congo Ashanty/CBS
- Image of Africa (1979) Congo Ashanty/Epic/CBS
- Heart of the Congos(1981) Go-Feet Records
- Best of Congos vol. 1 (1983) Tafari
- Natty Dread Rise Again (1997) RAS
- Revival (1998) VP
- Live at Maritime Hall: San Francisco (2000) 2B1
- Lion Treasure (2001) JDC/M10
- Give Them the Rights (2005) Young Tree
- Fisherman Style (2006) Blood and Fire
- Cock Mouth Kill Cock (2006) Explorer Music also issued as Feast (2006) Kingston Sounds
- Swinging Bridge (2006) Mediacom/Nocturne
- Back in the Black Ark (2009) Mediacom
- We Nah Give Up Pura Vida & The Congos(2011), Lost Ark Music 001
- Dub Feast (2012) Jamaican Recordings
- FRKWYS Vol. 9: Icon Give Thank (2012), RVNG Intl – with Sun Araw and M. Geddes Gengras
- Morning Star (2018), Lost Ark Music – with Pura Vida

Contributing artist

- The Rough Guide to Reggae (1997) World Music Network
