= Alton Ellis =

Jamaican singer-songwriter

Alton Ellis OD
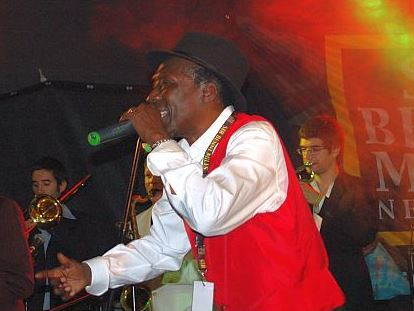
- Alton Ellis performing live in 2007

Background information
- Also known as: The Godfather of Rocksteady
- Born: Alton Nehemiah Ellis; 1 September 1938; Kingston, Jamaica
- Died: 10 October 2008 (aged 70) London, England
- Genres: R&B, ska, rocksteady, reggae
- Occupation: Singer-songwriter
- Instrument: Vocals
- Years active: 1959–2008
- Labels: Studio One, Treasure Isle, Trojan, Ackee, Bamboo

Alton Nehemiah Ellis OD (1 September 1938 – 10 October 2008) was a Jamaican singer-songwriter. One of the innovators of rocksteady, he was given the informal title "Godfather of Rocksteady". In 2006, he was inducted into the International Reggae And World Music Awards Hall Of Fame.

== Early life ==
Born Alton Nehemiah Ellis in Trenchtown, Kingston, Jamaica, Ellis was raised within a musical family which included his older brothers Leslie [who performed as one of his back up singers and co-wrote some of his songs], and Irving [known as 'Niney'] who was a popular singer and steel pan player on Jamaica's North Coast. He learned to play the piano at a young age. He attended Ebeneezer and Boys' Town schools, where he excelled in both music and sport. While at Boys' Town Ellis performed as a dancer (in a duo) in the first show that a school director called Mr Bailey had organized for Vere Johns who had been invited down to talent scout. He would later compete on Vere Johns' Opportunity Hour. After winning some competitions, he switched to singing, starting his career in 1959 as part of the duo Alton & Eddy with Eddy Parkins.

== Career ==
=== Rhythm and blues ===
Ellis and Parkins recorded for Coxsone Dodd at Studio One, initially in the R&B style, having a hit in 1960 with "Muriel" (from Dodd's first commercially oriented recording session at Federal studios), a song Ellis had written while working as a labourer on a building site. This initial success was followed by the release of "My Heaven", which like "Muriel" was a slow R&B ballad with the instrumental triplets and vocal harmonizing common to the ballads of that period. Further releases in the R&B style followed: "Lullabye Angel", "I Know It All", "I'm Never Gonna Cry" and "Yours". The duo also recorded R&B tracks for Vincent Chin's Randy's label including "Let Me Dream". The duo split after Parkins won a major talent contest and moved to the United States. Ellis remained in Kingston, working as a printer and after losing his job, he restarted his music career, initially forming a new duo with John Holt. When Holt joined The Paragons, Ellis formed a new group, The Flames. Ellis continued to work for Dodd and also recorded for his arch-rival, Duke Reid on his Treasure Isle label. At the start of his career Ellis recorded with his younger sister Hortense; early tracks with Hortense like "Don't Gamble With Love" (1965) were still in the R&B style.

=== Ska and rocksteady ===
By the mid-1960s, ska was moving on and the beat was slowing down to rocksteady and becoming associated with the violent rude boy subculture in Jamaican dancehalls. Many artists made records referring to the rude boys, including Ellis, although his records were consistently anti-rudie, including "Don't Trouble People", "Dance Crasher", and "Cry Tough". Releasing records under the name Alton Ellis and The Flames (the varying line-up of which included his brother Leslie Ellis, David "Baby G" Gordon and Winston Jarrett); the group had hits with "Girl I've Got a Date" and "Cry Tough".

"Girl I've Got a Date" recorded with Gladstone Anderson on piano, Paul Douglas on drums, Hux Brown on rhythm guitar, Lynn Taitt on guitar, and Jackie Jackson on bass is considered one of the foundational songs of the rocksteady genre. The bass line of "Girl I've Got a Date" was allegedly duplicated in other international hits "The Liquidator" (Harry J Allstars and "I'll Take You There" (The Staple Singers).

The release of "Rock Steady" (1967) backed by Tommy McCook and the Supersonics, the first song to refer to the name of the new genre, heralded the new direction Jamaican popular music was taking. Ellis continued to have hits for Treasure Isle; working with artists such as Lloyd Charmers, Phyllis Dillon and The Heptones. His Mr Soul of Jamaica album (with Tommy McCook and the Supersonics) is regarded as one of the definitive rocksteady albums.

Ellis toured the United Kingdom in the 1967 with Ken Boothe and Studio One session band the Soul Vendors and on his return to Jamaica he worked with Dodd, recording the tracks that would be released as his debut album Alton Ellis Sings Rock & Soul. During the late 1960s and early 1970s, Ellis recorded for some of Jamaica's top producers including Bunny Lee, Keith Hudson, and Herman Chin Loy. He also began to produce his own records, including "My Time Is The Right Time" (1968) and "The Message". He had two hits with Lloyd Daley in "Deliver Us" (1970) and "Back to Africa" (1971), both released in the UK on the Gas record label, a subsidiary of Pama Records.

Ellis regularly returned to England, working with several London-based producers and after spending a few years in Canada, from 1972 he based himself permanently in the UK. Ellis continued to record and perform regularly, recording in the early 1980s for emerging producers including Henry "Junjo" Lawes, Sugar Minott, and King Jammy. He also opened up the All-Tone record shop in South London, and started a record label of the same name.

Ellis continued to be active on the reggae scene until his health began to deteriorate. His latest works include performing all over Europe with a French backing-band called ASPO (About Some Precioux Oldies) at the beginning of the 21st century. Recorded in Bordeaux, France, Live with Aspo: Workin' on a Groovy Thing is the only live album Alton Ellis ever released (2001).

In 2004, Ellis was awarded the Order of Distinction by the Jamaican government in recognition of his achievements.

In December 2007, he was admitted to hospital in London for treatment of cancer of the lymph glands (Hodgkins disease), but he returned to live performance after receiving chemotherapy.

Ellis died of cancer on 10 October 2008 at Hammersmith Hospital, London. His death prompted a statement from Jamaica's Minister of Information, Culture, Youth and Sports, Olivia "Babsy" Grange, who said "even as we mourn the great Alton Ellis, we must give thanks for his monumental contribution to the development of Jamaica's popular music". A funeral service and celebration of his life was held on 3 November, attended by family, fans, music industry personnel and government ministers, with tribute performances from stars including Mr. Fix It Winston Francis, Tinga Stewart, George Nooks, Tony Gregory, Ken Boothe, Judy Mowatt and Carlene Davis.

In 2012 it was announced that the main hall of the new Trench Town Multi-Purpose Building would be named the Alton Ellis Auditorium in his honour.

He was the older brother of the late Hortense Ellis, and the father of more than twenty children, including Noel Ellis and Christopher Ellis, who are both reggae singers. He was also the uncle of the Jamaican comedians Owen "Blakka" Ellis and Ian "Ity" Ellis.

== Legacy ==
The "Mad Mad" riddim (the track "Mad Mad" by Alton Ellis and the Sound Dimension band was released in 1968 on the Coxsone label) has been reused or sampled by many hip-hop, dancehall and reggae producers and artists. The recognizable three-note descending horn line was reinterpreted by Henry "Junjo" Lawes, and eventually became known as the "Diseases" reggae riddim. "Diseases" is notably used in Yellowman's hit song "Zungguzungguguzungguzeng", which has in turn has been sampled and reinterpreted by a long list of popular hip-hop artists, including KRS-One, The Notorious B.I.G., Tupac Shakur, Sublime, and Blackstar. This constant reinterpretation and referencing has made Ellis a major but little-known influence in the trajectory of dancehall, reggae and hip-hop.

== Discography ==
=== Albums ===
- Sings Rock and Soul (Studio One, 1967)
- Sunday Coming (Coxsone, 1971)
- Mr Soul of Jamaica (Treasure Isle, 1974) [aka Greatest Hits]
- Still in Love (Horse, 1977)
- Love to Share (Third World, 1979)
- Many Moods of Alton Ellis (Tele-Tech, 1980)
- Showcase (Studio One, 1984)
- A New Day (Body Music, 1983)
- Daydreaming (Silver Camel, 1983)
- 25th Silver Jubilee (Sky Note, 1984)
- Continuation (All Tone, 1985)
- Jubilee Volume 2 (Sky Note, 1985)
- Here I Am (Angella, 1988)
- Sets A Better Example (Half-Way Tree, 1989)
- Family Vibes (All Tone, 1992)
- Cry Tough (Reissue of Greatest Hits (1973) with extras on Heartbeat, 1993)
- Man From Studio One (All Tone, 1994)
- Change My Mind (Orchard, 2000)
- More Alton Ellis (T.P., 2001)
- Live with Aspo: Workin' on a Groovy Thing (Belleville International/Patate Records, 2001)
- Muriel (All Tone, 2007)

With the Heptones

- Mr Skabeana (Cha Cha, 1981)
- Alton Ellis Sings, Heptones Harmonise (1978–80) (Jet Star, 19??)

With Wayne McGhie

- Wayne McGhie and the Sounds of Joy (Birchmount, Canada, 1970)

With Hortense Ellis

- Alton & Hortense Ellis at Studio 1 (Heartbeat, 1990)

=== Compilations ===
- The Best Of (Coxsone, 1969)
- Valley of Decision [197X] (Prestige, 1993)
- Duke Reid Collection (Rhino, 1994)
- Soul Groover (Trojan, 1997)
- Reggae Max (Jet Star, 1997)
- Get Ready for Rock Reggae Steady [1967–74] (Jamaican Gold, 1999)
- Arise Black Man (1968–78) (Moll Selekta, 1999)
- My Time Is the Right Time [1966–71] (Westside, 2000)
- Be True to Yourself [1965–73] (Trojan, 2004)
- All My Tears [1965–68] (Brook, 2006)
- Reggae Chronicles (Hallmark, 2006)
- Soul Train Is Coming (Rock A Shacka, 2008)
- Story of Mister Soul (Jahslams, 2009)
- Legend (Attack, 2009)
- Treasure Isle 1966-1968 (Kingston Sounds, 2019)
