= The Royals (band) =

The Royals were a Jamaican roots reggae vocal group formed in 1964 by Roy Cousins. They continued to record, with a varying line-up until the mid-1980s.

== History ==
The earliest line-up of the group featured Cousins along with Bertram Johnson and Errol Green, initially under the name The Tempests. Green had been the lead vocalist, but departed to be replaced by Errol Wilson, who worked with Cousins at the Jamaican Post Office. They recorded in the mid-1960s for producers including Duke Reid, Lloyd Daley, and Coxsone Dodd (the original version of "Pick Up the Pieces" (1967), which Dodd rejected at the time), but their first release was not until 1968, with "Never See Come See" for Joe Gibbs. After a few more well-received singles, Cousins disbanded the group and took a two-year break, saving money from his Post Office job. Cousins then set up his own 'Tamoki', 'Wambesi', and 'Uhuru' labels, issuing "Down Comes The Rain". In 1971, The Royals re-recorded "Pick Up the Pieces", with Lloyd Forest temporarily replacing Wilson, its success prompting Dodd to issue the original version (still credited to The Tempests), which was also popular, its riddim being used by several other artists since. More releases in a similar vein followed during the 1970s, these later collected on the album Pick Up the Pieces in 1978, released by Mo Claridge's newly formed Mojo distribution. The line-up changed again in 1975, with Cousins recruiting new members to replace his former colleagues who moved to Channel One Studios and recorded as The Jays. The success of Pick Up the Pieces led to a deal with United Artists, with two more studio albums (Ten Years After and Israel Be Wise) following, but Cousins then increasingly concentrated on producing other artists. Pick Up the Pieces was reissued in 2002 by Pressure Sounds.

== Discography ==
=== Albums ===
- Pick Up the Pieces (1978, Magnum)
- Ten Years After (1978, Ballistic)
- Israel Be Wise (1978, Ballistic)
- Moving On (1983, Kingdom)
- Royals Collection (1983, Trojan)
- Dubbing with the Royals (2004, Pressure Sounds)
- 1964-1981: Sweat (2005, Tamoki Wambesi)
