= Pablove Black =

Jamaican musician

- Also known as: Pablo Black
- Born: Paul Anthony Dixon; 24 October 1950 (age 75)
- Origin: Kingston, Jamaica
- Genres: Ska, rocksteady, reggae
- Occupations: Record producer, musician
- Instruments: Keyboard, steel drums
- Years active: 1960s–present
- Website: pablove.com

Pablove Black (born Paul Anthony Dixon, 24 October 1950) is a Jamaican reggae musician (keyboards and steel drums), arranger, composer, bandleader, vocalist and producer.

== Biography ==
Pablove started playing piano and steel drums in the mid-1960s and, within six months, made his first television appearance with Pan Master, Kelvin Hart and the all Trinidadian Federal All Star Steel Band. By 1968 he was a member of the UWI Carnival Champions, The Wanderers.

In 1971, Pablove, already exposed to the roots music of the Skatalites, joined the Studio One crew and, under the watchful eyes of record producer Clement "Sir Coxsone" Dodd and jazz musicians Jackie Mittoo (keyboards), Ernest Ranglin (guitar), and Roland Alphonso (saxophone), made invaluable contributions playing keyboards, arranging music and doing background vocals with Earl "Bagga" Walker and the Soul Defenders for artists including Dennis Brown, Burning Spear, Marcia Griffiths, Freddie McGregor, and Johnny Osbourne. Pablove also worked at the Black Ark Studios of Lee Perry where he collaborated on products for Little Roy (Tribal War), and Junior Byles (Curly Locks), along with Junior Dan (bass) and Benbow (drums).

Since then, Black has travelled with Jimmy Cliff, Sugar Minnott, and many more. He is well known in the reggae circle, and can still be heard on the tracks of current reggae musicians such as Ras Mikey (ISOULJAHS), Etosi Brooks, Tashiba, Nanko, Kashief Lindo, and 3HOT3HANDLE.

== Discography ==
=== Singles ===
- "High Locks" / "Soul Locks"

=== Albums ===
- Mr. Music Originally (1979)
- Charcoal Charlie (1986)
