= Winston Francis =

- Also known as: Billy Cole, King Cool, Bob Melody, Tony Gordon, Wayne Van Dross, Bobby Francis
- Born: 1943 (age 82–83)
- Origin: Kingston, Jamaica
- Genres: Rocksteady, Reggae
- Instrument: Vocals
- Years active: 1965–present
- Website: http://www.winstonfrancis.com/

Winston Francis (born 1943) aka Mr Fix It is a Jamaican singer whose career began in the 1960s.

== Biography ==
Born in Kingston in 1943, Francis served an apprentice as a printer before relocating to Miami at the age of 16. He attended music school, and his teacher Chuck Bird arranged for him to perform with the Jackie Gleason Orchestra in front of Spiro Agnew in 1965. He then joined Carlos Malcolm's Afro Jamaicans band, with whom he toured the US and the Caribbean. He was also a member of The Sheridans (with Pat Kelly) In the late 1960s he recorded as a solo artist for Clement "Coxsone" Dodd's Studio One label, with his debut album Mr. Fix-It released in 1969. This was followed by a second album, California Dreaming in 1970, with the title track released as a single and chosen as 'Hit Pick of the Week' for two weeks running by Tony Blackburn on his BBC Radio 1 show. The single's B-side, "Too Experienced", featured backing vocals from Bob Marley and Bunny Wailer. He relocated to the UK that year. He toured the UK club circuit and recorded for EMI in the 1970s.

From 1968 to 1972 Winston had numerous 7" releases on labels such as JJ's, Supreme, WIRL, Bamboo, Coxsone, Punch, Studio One, Tiger, Banana, Decca, Rhino.

In 1972 Francis recorded "Blue Moon". The song peaked at number 34 in Australia in February 1973.

After a period of inactivity, Francis returned to recording in the early 1980s, releases including the Roy Cousins-produced Just Once. After a break from music when he worked as a youth worker and social worker, he returned in 1987 as a backing vocalist for The Melodians and began working with Trevor Star and the Skaticians. He continued to record in the 1990s, working with Dennis Bovell under the name King Cool, and releasing Ragga Love and Sweet Rock Steady, and guested on Kelly's 1995 album Butterflies. His version of Ben E King's "Stand by Me" was a hit in France, selling over 90,000 copies, leading to work with Sly & Robbie and John Kpiaye. In 2003 he teamed up with fellow veteran AJ Franklin to record the album Stand Firm. In 2004, he released the medley album Feel Good All Over.

== Discography ==
=== Albums ===
- Mr. Fix-It (1969), Coxsone
- California Dreaming (1971), Bamboo
- Reggae Party (1978), Don't Stop Music
- Just Once (1983), Tamoki-Wambesi
- Ragga Love (1992), Metronome
- Sweet Rock Steady (1997), LKJ Records LTD
- Nostalgia Transcends Vol.1 (1997), Aquarius
- Feel Good All Over (2004), Jet Star
- Peace, Love & Harmony (2007), Soulove Records
- Someone Special (2010), World Sound Music
- Just in Time (2015), Grover Records
- Unfinished Business (2024), Tamoki-Wambesi-Dove

Compilations

- Mr. Fix-It/California Dreaming

=== as Billy Cole ===
- Woman (197?), Recreational And Educational Enterprises

=== as King Cool ===
- King Cool (1994), Disques Vogue
- His Majesty Requests (1995), BMG France

=== Francis & Franklin ===
- Stand Firm (2003), Definite

=== DVD ===
- Winston Francis Meets Rude Rich and the High Notes (2008)
