= Cry Tough (Alton Ellis album) =

Compilation album by Alton Ellis
- Released: 1993
- Recorded: Treasure Isle, Kingston, Jamaica, 1966-1968
- Genre: Rocksteady
- Label: Heartbeat
- Producer: Arthur "Duke" Reid, Sonia Pottinger

Professional ratings
Review scores
Source	Rating
Allmusic	5/5 stars

Cry Tough is a 1993 collection of Alton Ellis recordings from the rocksteady era of 1966-1968. It was released in 1993 by Heartbeat Records, and features the pick of Ellis' work for Arthur "Duke" Reid, plus some tracks produced by Sonia Pottinger. The album contains most of Ellis' original Mr. Soul of Jamaica album, and contains the same tracks as the 1973 Greatest Hits compilation on Count Shelly Records, plus eight additional tracks. Several of the tracks are alternate takes of some of his biggest hits from the era. The backing band is the Treasure Isle studio band of the time, Tommy McCook and the Supersonics. The album was included in the Rough Guides book Reggae: 100 Essential CDs.

== Track listing ==
1. "Breaking Up"
2. "Why Birds Follow Spring"
3. "I Can't Stop Now"
4. "Ain't That Loving You"
5. "You Make Me So Very Happy"
6. "Remember That Sunday (Alternate Take)"
7. "All My Tears Come Rolling"
8. "Baby I Love You"
9. "Chatty Chatty People"
10. "Willow Tree"
11. "If I Could Rule This World"
12. "What Does It Take (Take Two)"
13. "Cry Tough (Take Six)"
14. "Girl I've Got A Date (Soul Style)"
15. "Can't Stand It (Extended Mix)"
16. "I'm Just A Guy (Soul Style)"
17. "La Means I Love You"
18. "Why Did You Leave Me To Cry"
19. "The Same Song"
20. "Black Man, White Man (Take Two)"
