= Winston Jarrett =

Jamaican reggae singer (born 1940)

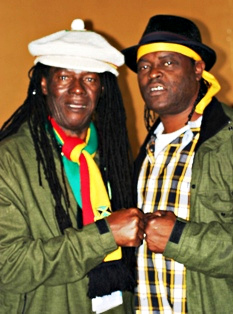
- Jarrett (left) with Sugar Minott in 2005

Background information
- Born: 14 September 1940 (age 85)
- Origin: Lime Tree Gardens, Saint Ann Parish, Jamaica
- Genres: Rocksteady, reggae
- Occupation: Singer-songwriter
- Instrument: Vocals
- Years active: Early 1960s–present
- Labels: Treasure Isle, Studio One, RAS, Heartbeat

Winston Jarrett (born 14 September 1940) is a Jamaican conscious foundation roots reggae singer who was part of Alton Ellis's group The Flames in the 1960s before recording with The Righteous Flames and as a solo artist.

== Biography ==
Born in 1940 in Lime Tree Gardens, Saint Ann Parish, Jarrett grew up in the Jones Town area of Kingston after moving there with his mother at the age of five. There, he was taught to play guitar by Jimmy Cliff and Alton Ellis. Jarrett's introduction to the music industry was as a member of Alton Ellis's backing band The Flames in the early 1960s, formed when Ellis's original singing partner Eddie Perkins emigrated to the US, singing on hits such as "Dancecrasher", "Cry Tough", "Rocksteady" and "Girl I've Got a Date". While with Ellis he wrote songs such as "Sunday Coming" and "True Born African". In 1967, Jarrett parted ways with the UK-bound Ellis and with fellow Flame Edgar "Egga" Gardner formed The Righteous Flames with Junior Green, and the trio recorded for Arthur "Duke" Reid's Treasure Isle label and then for Clement "Coxsone" Dodd's Studio One label. In 1969 they also recorded for Lee "Scratch" Perry ("Zion I Love You"). In the 1970s, they were generally billed as 'Winston Jarrett and the Righteous Flames'. Among the members of The Righteous Flames was Danny Clarke, who left to form The Meditations in 1974.

In the 1970s, tired of recording for others without receiving adequate payment, Jarrett self-produced much of his output, releasing it on his own Attra, Human Rights and Humble labels. Jarrett recorded as a solo artist in the late 1970s and 1980s, releasing the Wise Man album in 1979 and Rocking Vibration in 1984. He re-formed the Flames, releasing the album Jonestown in the late 1980s, and in the early 1990s recorded a tribute album to Bob Marley, also featuring Peter Tosh and Bunny Wailer.

== Discography ==
- The Kingston Rock (1974), RCA – split with Horace Andy
- Man of the Ghetto (1977), Sonic Sounds – Winston Jarrett & the Righteous Flames
- Wise Man (1979), Tamoki Wambesi
- Ranking Ghetto Style (1980), Gorgon
- Rocking Vibration (1984), Culture Press
- Jonestown (1989), Nighthawk
- Kingston Vibrations (1991), RAS
- Sings Tribute to Bob Marley (1994), Original – Winston Jarrett & the Righteous Flames
- Solid Foundation (1995), Heartbeat
- Too Many Boundaries (1995), RAS
- Crucial Times (2003), Studio One
- Children of the Ghetto (2006), Jah Shaka Music
- Bushwhackers Gangbangers (2010), Bigmore

Compilations

- Rise Up! Classics from the 60's (2001), Sankofa – Winston Jarrett & the Righteous Flames
- Survival Is the Game (2005), Young Tree
- Unity & Livity (1999), JDC
