= Black Ark Studios =

Recording studio in Kingston, Jamaica

- Location: Kingston, Jamaica
- Owner: Lee Perry
- Type: Recording studio

Construction
- Opened: 1973; 53 years ago
- Closed: 1979; 47 years ago

The Black Ark was the recording studio of reggae and dub producer Lee "Scratch" Perry, built in 1973 and located behind his family's home in the Washington Gardens neighborhood of Kingston, Jamaica. Despite the rudimentary set-up and dated equipment, it was nonetheless the breeding ground for some of Jamaica's most innovative sounds and recording techniques in the latter half of the 1970s.

== Innovative musical techniques ==
From a technological standpoint, the Black Ark was at the low end in comparison to the international music recording standards of its day. The studio's legendary reputation stems from the innovative production techniques employed by Perry to create sounds that baffled his contemporaries, and which have continued to be a source of amazement to later generations of music producers. The studio's circuitry was designed by King Tubby, and its equipment included a four-track Soundcraft mixing console, a TEAC tape recorder, an Echoplex delay unit and a Roland Space Echo. Unlike Tubby, who generally mixed recordings supplied by other producers, Perry primarily worked with his own productions and often recorded material with multiple versions already in mind.

An example of Perry's style was his ability to overdub layers of sound effects and instrumentation on each recording track of a basic 4-track machine, with precise timing and unique effects. Many of his songs are layered with a variety of subtle effects created from broken glass, ghastly sighs and screeches, crying babies, falling rain and cow noises. While it was thought that Perry recorded the "mooing" noises from actual cows, it was actually the baritone voice of Watty Burnett through a tin-foil-laced cardboard tube that produced the cow-like noises. These and other notable recording techniques helped define the Black Ark sound, as well as Lee Perry's creative legacy.

Perry was known for his eccentric and superstitious behavior during production sessions. He would often "bless" his recording equipment with mystical invocations, blow ganja smoke onto his tapes while recording, bury unprotected tapes in the soil outside of his studio, and surround himself with burning candles and incense, whose wax and dust remnants were allowed to infest his electronic recording equipment. He would also spray tapes with a variety of fluids, including urine, blood and whisky, ostensibly to enhance their spiritual properties. Later commentators have drawn a direct relationship between the decay of Perry's facility and the unique sounds he was able to create from his studio equipment.

Perry has described his relationship to the studio thus:

The studio must be like a living thing, a life itself. The machine must be live and intelligent. Then I put my mind into the machine and the machine perform reality. Invisible thought waves — you put them into the machine by sending them through the controls and the knobs or you jack it into the jack panel. The jack panel is the brain itself, so you got to patch up the brain and make the brain a living man, that the brain can take what you sending into it and live.

== Musicians and the Black Ark ==
Artists who were produced and/or recorded at the Black Ark include Bob Marley, Gregory Isaacs, Junior Byles, the Congos, Junior Murvin, Max Romeo, Mighty Diamonds, the Heptones, Augustus Pablo and Jah Lion. Perry worked with the Clash and Paul McCartney and his band Wings had recorded there between 1972 and 1979.

Paul Douglas mentions, "Scratch had a particular sound and everybody was fascinated by his sound. He had this way of putting things together; it was just his sound and it influenced a lot of people. I've even gone to the Black Ark with Eric Gale for that Negril album; I remember myself and Val Douglas, we laid some tracks there, Eric Gale overdubbed stuff on there, but I honestly don't remember what happened to it."

Perry and his studio contributed to the development of dub, a subgenre of reggae in which producers and engineers manipulate pre-recorded tracks through mixing techniques, using the mixing console as a musical instrument.

== Final Year ==
In 1979, following years of increasingly bizarre and erratic behavior, Perry, armed with a magic marker, covered every available surface of the Black Ark with impenetrable writings before allegedly burning it to the ground. This event, with the loss of the studio's unique sound and a hiatus in Perry's extraordinary creative skills, effectively ended an era during which much of Jamaica's most innovative sounds had captured the world of music. However, it has been related by several Perry family members that the studio in fact caught fire in 1983 after an ill-fated attempt to rebuild it, the result of an electrical accident.

More often than not, Perry has claimed that he personally destroyed the Black Ark due to "unclean spirits" – an allusion to some of the undesirable people who were constantly at the Black Ark in later years. There are also stories that Perry was being blackmailed by gangsters who wanted a cut of the record profits. Perry himself stated in an interview with Clash magazine regarding the fire, "Too much stress in Jamaica, all the time. Everybody want money, everybody want paid. Everyone got problem and want me to solve their problem. Nobody gave me anything, people just took everything. Everybody take this, and take that. So the atmosphere in the Black Ark studio was changing; it wasn't like it used to be. Then I decided to make a sacrifice as the energy wasn't good anymore."

Shortly thereafter, Perry moved to London and then Switzerland.

== Films ==
- 2011 – The Upsetter: The Life and Music of Lee Scratch Perry. Directed by Ethan Higbee and Adam Bhala Lough.
