= Cedric Myton =

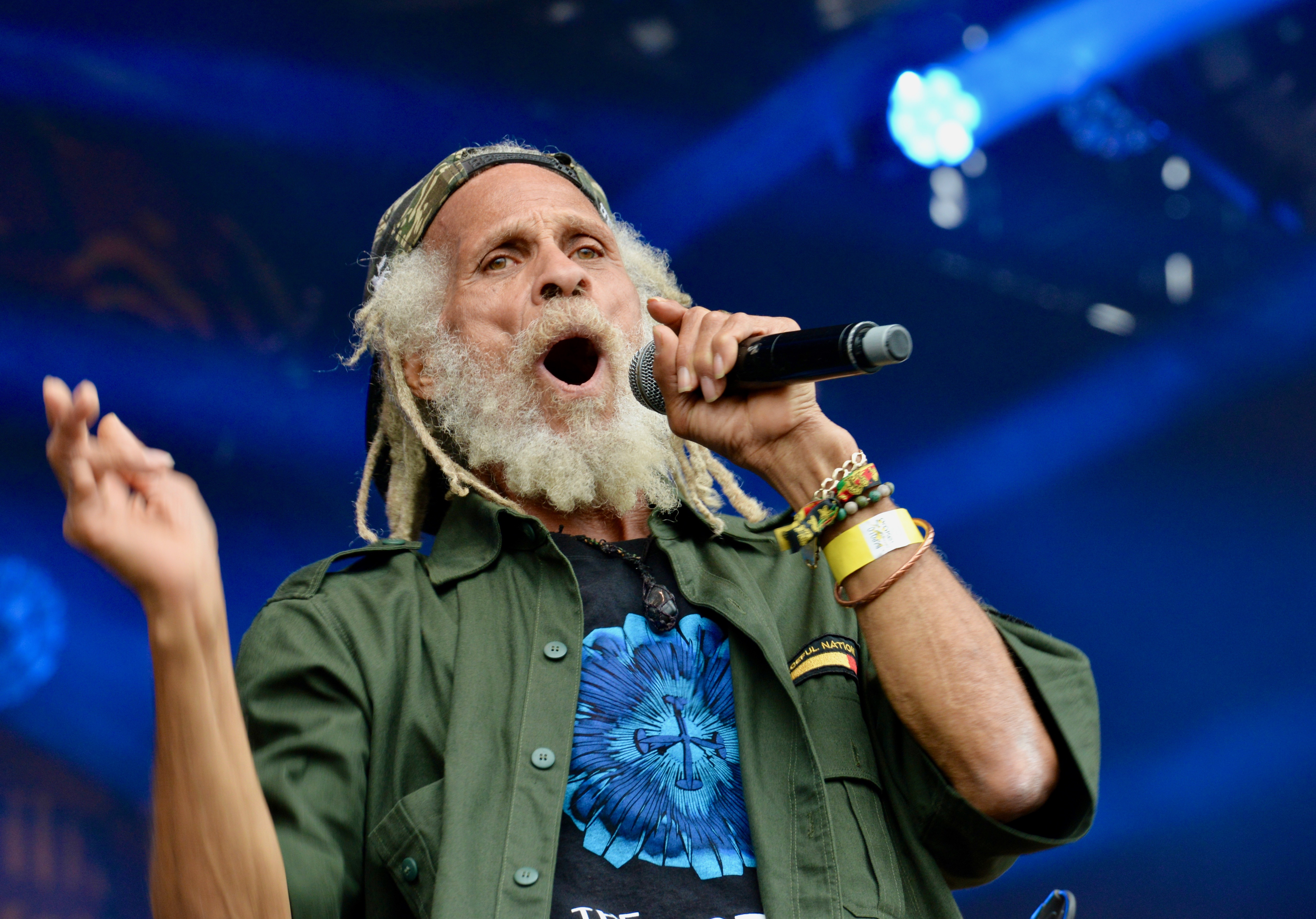
- Myton performing with the Congos in 2019

Background information
- Born: Cedric Constantine Myton; 1947 (age 78–79)
- Origin: Jamaica
- Genre: Reggae
- Label: Go-Feet Records

Cedric Constantine Myton (born 1947) is a Jamaican Rastafari reggae musician who was a founding member of the roots reggae band the Congos.

== Career ==
Myton was born in Old Harbour, Jamaica. He began his singing career with the group The Bell Stars, who recorded one single 45" "over and over" (1967), which was a minor success. Alongside Lincoln Thompson, "preps" Lewis, and Devon Russell, Myton formed the Tartans in 1968; the group released many 45" singles and had early success in 1969 with the hit 45 "Dance All Night". After a couple of years, the Tartans disbanded, and Myton, alongside Lincoln "Prince" Thompson, formed "The Royal Rasses". Myton spent almost three years alongside Thompson, writing the tracks which would constitute the Royal Rasses album Humanity. Myton also sang on every track on Humanity. This album was a big success, although Myton left The Royal Rasses shortly after the release of Humanity. The band continued without Myton, who went on to form the Congos, alongside Roydel Johnson, who had a rich "tenor" and Watty Burnett who provided a "Deep Barritone", which combined with Myton's rich "Falsetto" anchored the Congos.

The first album they recorded, Heart of the Congos, was produced by Lee "Scratch" Perry. Due to both a dispute between the Perry and Island Records' favouritism of Bob Marley, Heart of the Congos was shelved because it was deemed "a strong album." Island Records, led by Chris Blackwell, felt it would take away the limelight from Marley. Initially it was released in very limited numbers on Perry's Black Art label and Perry re-mixed the album adding various external sounds, such as "cow horns" provided by the baritone Burnett. Many years later the English group The Beat released Heart of the Congos on their own Go-Feet label, as did the company Blood and Fire. Heart of the Congos was a big success.

Later, Myton pursued a solo career. After some time, the Congos reformed and recorded an album titled Back in the Black Ark. The group toured as well, appearing at music festivals such as the 2012 Rototom Sunsplash.
