= Sizzla discography =

The following list is albums on which the reggae/dancehall musician Sizzla performs.

== Studio albums ==
Title	Release date	Label
Burning Up	5 September 1995	RAS
Black Woman & Child	16 September 1997	VP
Praise Ye Jah	21 October 1997	Xterminator
Strong, 2	1998	Star Trail
Freedom Cry	9 November 1998	VP
Good Ways	21 December 1998	VP
Royal Son of Ethiopia	22 June 1999	Greensleeves
Be I Strong	2 November 1999	VP
Liberate Yourself	1 February 2000	Reggae 1 Luv
Words of Truth	29 August 2000	VP
Bobo Ashanti	31 August 2000	Greensleeves
Taking Over	19 June 2001	VP
Black History	26 June 2001	Charm
Rastafari Teach I Everything	4 September 2001	Greensleeves
Hosanna	2002	Reggae Central
Blaze Up the Chalwa	22 January 2002	Charm
Ghetto Revolution	24 September 2002	Greensleeves
Up in Fire	1 October 2002	2B1 II
Da Real Thing	19 November 2002	VP
Blaze Fire Blaze	2002	Whodat Records
African Children	2003	Fire Ball Records
Ever So Nice	2003	Kalonji Records
Light of My World	22 April 2003	Jet Star
Bus Tour	20 September 2003	
Rise to the Occasion	30 September 2003	Greensleeves
Red Alert	27 January 2004	Charm
Speak of Jah	24 February 2004	Bogalusa
Jah Knows Best	8 June 2004	RAS / Sanctuary
Stay Focus	24 August 2004	VP
Life	12 October 2004	Greensleeves
Judgememt Yard	2004	A-Town
Brighter Day	8 March 2005	Kingston
Soul Deep	12 July 2005	Greensleeves
Burning Fire	29 March 2005	Penitentiary
Jah Protect	14 March 2006	Penitentiary
Ain't Gonna See Us Fall	4 April 2006	VP
Waterhouse Redemption	5 May 2006	Greensleeves
The Overstanding	17 October 2006	Dame Dash Music Group/Koch Records
Children of Jah	3 April 2007	Rude Boy
Jah Bless Me With Life	2007	A-Town Records
I-Space	26 June 2007	Greensleeves
Rastafari	4 March 2008	Penitentiary
Addicted	30 May 2008	LGN Entertainment
Stand Tall (Ghetto Youth-Ology)	April 2009	Yes Records
Crucial Times	19 January 2010	Greensleeves
The Scriptures	June 2011	John John/Kalonji Records
Welcome To The Good Life	July 2011	VP Records/Kalonji Records
The Chant	February 2012	Afrojam Music
In Gambia	March 2012	VP Records/Kalonji Records
Don't Mislead the Youths EP	April 2012	Locksmith Records
The Messiah	May 2013	VP Records
Nuh Worry Unu Self	March 2014	John John Records
876	May 2017	Judgment Yard
I'm Yours	11 August 2017	FX Music Group
Victory	18 March 2019	BREADBACKPRODUCTIONS
Run Tingz	April 2023	Lead Out Productions / Kalonji Music Productions

== Compilations ==
Title	Release date	Label
Reggae Max: Sizzla	2000	Jetstar
Reggae Chartbusters, Vol. 2	2000	
Best of Sizzla: The Story Unfolds	2002	VP Records
Judgement Yard	14 April 2004	
Reggae Max: Sizzla Part II	7 February 2006	Jetstar
The Journey: The Very Best of Sizzla	24 June 2008	Greensleeves
Yaniko Roots Riddim	2008	
Jah Youth Elevation Riddim	2008	
Sizzla – Ghetto Youth-Ology	2009	Greensleeves
Radical	2014	VP

== Live albums ==
Title	Release date	Label
Words of Truth	29 August 2000	VP
Da Real Thing Live	19 November 2002	VP

=== Charted singles ===
List of charted singles, showing year released, chart positions and album name
Title	Year	Peak chart position	Album
Title	Year	JAM Air.	Album
"Thank U Mamma"	2002	8	The Journey: The Very Best of Sizzla
"Give Me a Try"	2003	5	The Journey: The Very Best of Sizzla

== Appearances ==
Artist	Title	Song/s	Release date	Label
Various Artists	Riddim Driven – Chiney Gal & Blazing	Give It To Dem (Blazing Riddim)	2001	VP
Various Artists	Riddim Driven – Pressure Cooker	Straight Forward (Pressure Cooker Riddim)	2001	VP
Various Artists	Riddim Driven – Candle Wax	Gimme Di Woman (Candle Wax Riddim)	2001	VP
Various Artists	Riddim Driven – The Flip	Best Over All (The Flip Riddim)	2002	VP
Various Artists	Riddim Driven – Bondage	Long Live The King (Bondage Riddim)	2002	VP
Various Artists	Riddim Driven – X5	Say You Love Me (X5 Riddim)	2002	VP
Various Artists	Riddim Driven – Renegade	Renegade (Renegade Riddim)	2002	VP
Various Artists	Riddim Driven – Hi Fever	Stay Longer (Hi Fever Riddim)	2002	VP
Various Artists	Riddim Driven – Tabla	Armed And Dangerous (Tabla Riddim)	2002	VP
Various Artists	Riddim Driven – Engine	Scream Girl Child (Engine Riddim)	2002	VP
Various Artists	Riddim Driven – Blindfold	Just Through Mi Love (Blindfold Riddim)	2002	VP
Various Artists	Riddim Driven – Party Time	Satisfy Yourself (Party Time Riddim)	2002	VP
Various Artists	Riddim Driven – Rematch	To Rahtid (Rematch Riddim)	2002	VP
Various Artists	Riddim Driven – Mexican	Come On (Mexican Riddim)	2002	VP
Various Artists	Riddim Driven – G-String	Hard (G-String Riddim)	2002	VP
Various Artists	Riddim Driven – The Wave	Love So Pure (The Wave Riddim)	2003	VP
Various Artists	Riddim Driven – Diggy Diggy	Love De Youths Dem (Diggy Diggy Riddim)	2003	VP
Various Artists	Riddim Driven – Throw Back	Mo Money (Through Back Riddim)	2003	VP
Various Artists	Riddim Driven – All Out	Blessings From Jah (All Out Riddim)	2003	VP
Various Artists	Riddim Driven – Forensic	Watch Now (Forensic Riddim)	2003	VP
Various Artists	Riddim Driven – Scream	There She Goes (Scream Riddim)	2003	VP
Various Artists	Riddim Driven – Wanted	Love & Devotion (Wanted Riddim)	2003	VP
Various Artists	Riddim Driven – Good Times	I'm Gonna Give Love (Good Times Riddim)	2003	VP
Various Artists	Riddim Driven – Salsa	Shout It Out Loud (Salsa Riddim)	2003	VP
Various Artists	Riddim Driven – Puppy Water	Push It Up (Puppy Water Riddim)	2003	VP
Various Artists	Riddim Driven – Hot Gyal	Marijuana (Hot Gyal Riddim)	2004	VP
Various Artists	Riddim Driven – Flava	Jook Har (Flava Riddim)	2004	VP
Various Artists	Riddim Driven – Chrome	That's Ok (Chrome Riddim)	2004	VP
Various Artists	Riddim Driven – Doctor's Darling	Pure Love (Doctor's Darling Riddim)	2004	VP
Various Artists	Riddim Driven – I Swear	For You (I Swear Riddim)	2004	VP
Various Artists	Riddim Driven – Rah! Rah!	Smokin' Herbs (Rah! Rah! Riddim)	2005	VP
Various Artists	Riddim Driven – Kopa	Hot Like Fire (Kopa Riddim)	2005	VP
Various Artists	Riddim Driven – Bingie Trod	Break Down Babylon (Bingie Trod Riddim)	2005	VP
Various Artists	Riddim Driven – Cry Baby	Thanks & Praise (Cry Baby Riddim)	2005	VP
Various Artists	Riddim Driven – Bad Bargain	Living Up (Bad Bargain Riddim)	2005	VP
Various Artists	Riddim Driven – Lava Splash	Stop Fighting (Lava Splash Riddim)	2005	VP
Various Artists	Riddim Driven – Applause	Bun Out Pon Dem (Applause Riddim)	2005	VP
Various Artists	Greensleeves Rhythm Album 30: Bollywood	Heat Is On (Bollywood Riddim)	2002	Greensleeves
Various Artists	Greensleeves Rhythm Album 32: Threat	Doin' It Right (Threat Riddim)	2002	Greensleeves
Various Artists	Greensleeves Rhythm Album 35: Clappas	Spotlight (Clappas Riddim)	2003	Greensleeves
Various Artists	Greensleeves Rhythm Album 40: Egyptian	These Are the Days (Egyptian Riddim)	2003	Greensleeves
Various Artists	Greensleeves Rhythm Album 85: Inspector	Haffi Get It (Nah Rape) (Inspector Riddim)	2006	Greensleeves
Various Artists	Greensleeves Rhythm Album 86: Ghetto Whiskey	Mek It Beat (Ghetto Whiskey Riddim)	2006	Greensleeves
Various Artists	Reggae Gold 2005	I'm with the Girls (Military Riddim)	2005	VP
Various Artists	Ride Da Riddims	Karate (Martial Arts Riddim); Rain Showers	2003	UMTV
Various Artists	Ride Da Riddims 2	These Are The Days (Egyptian Riddim)	2004	UMTV
Project Groundation	Ballads & Bullets		2007	PGM
Project Groundation	Diplomatic Warrior		2007	PGM
Various Artists	Strictly One Drop 2007	Make Me Yours (Desperate Lover Riddim); Stop All The Violence (Mo-Bay Riddim)	2007	Cousins
Various Artists	Dis Ya Time Riddim	Good over evil produced by Bost & Bim / Special delivery music	2006	Special delivery Music
Various Artists	Soprano Riddim (Produced by Bost & Bim)	You and I	2009	The Bombist
Big Lean	Something Gotta Give	Sufferin' (Produced by Boi-1da)	2012	Da Degrees
Rick Ross	Mastermind	Mafia Music III (with Mavado)	2014	MMG, Slip-n-Slide, Def Jam
Big Lean	Enough Is Enough	Everything's Alright	2015	Da Degrees
Various Artists	Reggae In My Heart Vol. 1 (Produced by Adrian "Donsome" Hanson)	Love Connection	2016	Donsome Records LLC
DJ Khaled	Grateful	(Intro) I'm so Grateful	2017	We the Best, Epic
Gisto	Relief	Prosper	2020	Historical
