= Greensleeves Rhythm Album 32: Threat =

Greensleeves Rhythm Album #32: Threat

Compilation album by Various artists
- Released: November 26, 2002
- Recorded: 2002
- Genre: Dancehall
- Label: Greensleeves
- Producer: Troy McLean; Garfield Hamilton

Various artists chronology
Belly Skin (2002)	Greensleeves Rhythm Album #32: Threat (2002)	Mad Ants (2003)

Professional ratings
Review scores
Source	Rating
Allmusic	link

Greensleeves Rhythm Album #32: Threat is an album in Greensleeves Records' rhythm album series. It was released in November 2002 on CD and LP. The album features various artists recorded over the "Threat" riddim. The riddim was built by Steely & Clevie and produced by Troy McLean and Garfield Hamilton for First Name Productions.

== Track listing ==
1. "Ghetto Girls" - Elephant Man
2. "Don't Come Around" - Beenie Man
3. "Doin' It Right" - Sizzla
4. "Celebrate" - Assassin
5. "Where I'm From" - T.O.K.
6. "The Ras" - Spragga Benz
7. "Gal Out Road" - Lexxus
8. "Wine Your Waist" - Red Rat
9. "Girls Night" - Frisco Kid
10. "With Mi Gal" - Bling Dawg
11. "Gi Dem The Wine" - Mr. Vegas
12. "Phone Number" - Danny English & Egg Nog
13. "Pick a Side" - Kiprich
14. "Wanna Be" - Alozade
15. "Shake It" - Kirk Davis
16. "All Ma Ladies" - Zumjay
17. "Woman With Shape" - Lukie D
18. "Dreams & Hopes" - Hawkeye
19. "Fi Real" - Shaddu
20. "Quality Time" - Kiprich
