= Greensleeves Rhythm Album 3: Doorslam =

Greensleeves Rhythm Album #3: Doorslam

Compilation album by Various artists
- Released: June 20, 2000
- Recorded: 2000
- Genre: Dancehall
- Label: Greensleeves
- Producer: Harvel Hart

Various artists chronology
Virus (2000)	Greensleeves Rhythm Album #3: Doorslam (2000)	Volume (2000)

Greensleeves Rhythm Album #3: Doorslam is an album in Greensleeves Records' rhythm album series. It was released in June 2000 on CD and LP. The album features various artists recorded over the "Doorslam" riddim, produced by Harvel Hart for Annex Productions.

== Track listing ==
1. "Bust It" - Capleton
2. "Cool Bwoy" - Beenie Man
3. "Heard Of Dem" - Sizzla
4. "No One Cares" - Bounty Killer & Merciless
5. "Blank" - Lexxus
6. "This Means War" - Ward 21
7. "One" - Elephant Man
8. "More Gun" - Mr. Vegas
9. "Who Dem A Send" - Harry Toddler
10. "Ganja Man" - Hawkeye
11. "Screechie Pon Mi Toe" - Danny English
12. "Fleety Flighty" - Chico
13. "Rubbers" - Goofy
14. "20 Weed Commandments" - General B
15. "More Bun" - Mr. Vegas
16. "Good" - Zaro
17. "Load Up" - Alozade
18. "Badness" - Kiprich
19. "Lose Dem Way" - Fargo Voice
20. "Living Years" - Ghost
