= Bellyas =

Greensleeves Rhythm Album #1: Bellyas

Compilation album by Various artists
- Released: February 22, 2000
- Recorded: 2000
- Genre: Dancehall Reggae
- Label: Greensleeves
- Producer: Ward 21

Various artists chronology
Greensleeves Rhythm Album #1: Bellyas (2000)	Virus (2000)

Professional ratings
Review scores
Source	Rating
Allmusic	2.5/5 stars

Greensleeves Rhythm Album #1: Bellyas is the first album in Greensleeves Records' rhythm album series. It was released in February 2000 on CD and LP. The album features various artists recorded over the "Bellyas" riddim, produced by reggae-dancehall artists and producers Ward 21.

== Track listing ==
1. "Who Dem?" - Capleton
2. "Model & Pose" - Ward 21
3. "Two Minute More" - Mr. Vegas
4. "Skettel Tune" - Beenie Man & Angel Doolas
5. "Ghetto Youths" - Lexxus, Kiprich & Elephant Man
6. "Blood Stain" - Ward 21
7. "Praise" - Spragga Benz
8. "Halla Halla" - Lexxus
9. "Skin-A-Slap" - Red Rat
10. "Prowler" - Alozade
11. "Heights Of Great Men" - Beenie Man
12. "Live Up" - Bushman & I Lue
13. "Tight Pants" - Mega Banton
14. "Wash Pan" - Frisco Kid
15. "Mix Up Time" - Hawkeye
16. "Wi Like It" - Tanto Metro & Devonte
17. "Naah Go Switch" - Kiprich
18. "Dat Nuh Mek It" - Madd Anju
19. "Naah Heng Out" - Goofy
20. "Tight It Tight" - Jack A Diamond
