= Love Is All =

Love Is All may refer to:

== Bands ==
- Love Is All (band), Swedish indie rock band

== Films ==
- Love is All (2007 film), Dutch film
- Love Is All (2014 film), a documentary film by Kim Longinotto

== Songs ==
- "Love Is All", a song by The Action
- "Love Is All", a song by Air Supply from The Christmas Album
- "Love Is All", a song by Chantal Kreviazuk
- "Love is All", a song by Infernal
- "Love Is All", a song by Marc Anthony from Marc Anthony
- "Love Is All", a song by The Rapture from Echoes
- "Love Is All", a song by Red Hurley
- "Love Is All" (Roger Glover song), 1974, featuring Ronnie James Dio
- "Love Is All", a song by Sizzla from Be I Strong
- "Love Is All", a song by Tallest Man on Earth from The Wild Hunt
- "Love Is All", a song by Yanni from Tribute
- "Love is All", a 2009 song by Spandau Ballet from the album Once More
- "Love Is All...", a song by Infernal from Fall from Grace
- "Love Is All (Shine Your Light on Me)", a song by Roxette from Crash! Boom! Bang!
