= Taking Over (Sizzla album) =

Studio album by Sizzla
- Released: June 19, 2001 (Vinyl; July 3, 2001 (CD)
- Genre: Reggae; Dancehall
- Label: VP

Sizzla chronology
Bobo Ashanti (2000)	Taking Over (2001)	Rastafari Teach I Everything (2001)

Professional ratings
Review scores
Source	Rating
Allmusic	3/5 stars

Taking Over is Jamaican reggae artist Sizzla's 11th studio album, released on June 19, 2001 on VP Records. It peaked at #7 on the Billboard reggae album charts.

== Track listing ==
1. "Thought for Today" (Collins, Dennis) – 3:50
2. "Brand New" (Collins, Dennis) – 4:02
3. "Somewhere Oh Oh" (Collins, Dennis) – 4:13
4. "Taking Over" (Collins, Dennis) – 4:04
5. "Fare" (Collins, Dennis, Dunbar) – 3:56
6. "Higher Heights" (Dennis, Dunbar) – 3:58
7. "To the Point" (Collins, Edmund, James) – 3:33
8. "Reach" (Collins, Dennis) – 3:39
9. "Whirlwind" (Collins) – 4:57
10. "Profile" (Collins) – 4:17
11. "Kebra Negas" (Collins) – 4:21
12. "New Shield Corruption" (Collins, Dennis) – 3:45
13. "King Taco" (Collins, Dennis) – 4:21
14. "Hold Her in My Arms" (Collins, Dennis) – 4:00
15. "Streetside Knowledge" (Collins, Dennis) – 4:07

== Credits ==
- Sizzla – vocals
- Black Pearl – engineer
- Philip Burrell – producer, executive producer
- Leroy Champaign – design
- Christopher Chin – executive producer
- Paul Daley – engineer
- Christopher James – producer, engineer
- John James – engineer
- Robert Murphy – engineer
- Sherida – Backing vocalist
- Steven Stanley – engineer
- Collin "Bulbie" York – engineer
