= Kalonji =

Kalonji may refer to:

== People ==
- Albert Kalonji (1929–2015), Congolese politician
- Gretchen Kalonji (born 1953), American scientist and academic administrator
- Sizzla or Sizzla Kalonji (born 1976), Jamaican reggae musician
- Kalonji Kashama (born 1991), Canadian football player

== Other ==
- The black seeds of the plant Nigella sativa, used as a spice in Asian cooking
- Kalonji, the title in Europe and Asia of the album Freedom Cry by Sizzla
