= Solid as a Rock (disambiguation) =

Solid as a Rock is a 1989 album by The Shooters.

"Solid as a Rock" is also the name of several songs, by the following artists, appearing on the following albums with dates:

- "Solid as a Rock", written by Bob Hilliard & David Mann
  - Count Basie and His Sextet, instrumental single (1949)
  - Ella Fitzgerald with Sy Oliver's Orchestra, single (1950), with lyrics by Teeona Fitzgerald
- Lee "Scratch" Perry, Chicken Scratch (1989)
- David Mullen, Faded Blues (1995)
- Sizzla, Da Real Thing (2002) and The Overstanding (2006)
- Bim Sherman, single (2006) and Miracle (2006)
- The Fenicians, Stoned Moments (2006)
- John Hogan, Where I Come From (2006)
- The Nazarenes, Rock Firm (2008)

== See also ==
The line "solid as a rock" appears in "Solid", a 1984 song by Ashford & Simpson
