= Warrior King =

Warrior King may refer to:

- Warrior King (musician) (Mark Dyer, born 1979), a Jamaican reggae singer
- "The Warrior King", a 1997 episode of Street Fighter, an animated TV series based on the Capcom franchise
- Tom-Yum-Goong, a 2005 Thai action film released in the United Kingdom as Warrior King
- Warrior King, a 2008 Iraq War memoir by Nathan Sassaman

== See also ==
- Warrior Kings, a 2002 video game
