= Greensleeves Rhythm Album 35: Clappas =

Greensleeves Rhythm Album #35: Clappas

Compilation album by Various artists
- Released: February 11, 2003
- Recorded: 2002–2003
- Genre: Dancehall
- Label: Greensleeves
- Producer: South Rakkas Crew

Various artists chronology
Masterpiece (2003)	Greensleeves Rhythm Album #35: Clappas (2003)	Knockout (2003)

Greensleeves Rhythm Album #35: Clappas is an album in Greensleeves Records' rhythm album series. It was released in February 2003 on CD and LP. The album features various artists recorded over the "Clappas" riddim. The riddim was produced by the South Rakkas Crew production team. The rhythm is inspired by Norman Greenbaum's hit pop song "Spirit in the Sky" and contains elements of Wayne Smith's hit Under Me Sleng Teng. The album includes the hit song "Under Mi Sensi" by Mr. Vegas, Alozade & Hollow Point, which is a take on the Barrington Levy classic by the same name.

== Track listing ==
1. "Under Mi Sensi" - Mr. Vegas, Alozade & Hollow Point
2. "Mr. Lover" - Elephant Man
3. "Wha Dat?" - Capleton
4. "Hotta, Betta, Phatta" - Ward 21
5. "Clap Your Hands" - Mr. Vegas
6. "U Good To Go" - Vybz Kartel
7. "Spotlight" - Sizzla
8. "Honey" - Ce'Cile
9. "Bring It On" - Beenie Man & T.O.K.
10. "Kaos" - Harry Toddler
11. "It's About Time" - Tanya Stephens
12. "Double Sick" - Mad Cobra
13. "Clappin'" - Capleton & The David House Crew
14. "Ghetto Pickney" - Mr. Vegas ft. Illa & Aisha
15. "Nuh Inna It" - Determine
16. "Talk" - Pickney
17. "Have Dat Lock" - Assassin
18. "I'm a Grown Man" - Lexxus
19. "Part Time Lover" - Irish Man
20. "All The Girls" - Jagwa
21. "Luv Up Mi Girl" - Chuck Fender
22. "2 Pack of Slam" - Merciless
