= Rise to the Occasion =

Rise to the Occasion may refer to:

- "Rise to the Occasion" (Climie Fisher song), 1987
- "Rise to the Occasion" (BWO song), 2009
- Rise to the Occasion (album), a 2003 album by Jamaican artist Sizzla
