= Royal Son of Ethiopia =

Studio album by Sizzla
- Released: June 22, 1999
- Genre: Reggae, Dancehall
- Label: Greensleeves

Sizzla chronology
Good Ways (1998)	Royal Son of Ethiopia (1999)	Be I Strong (1999)

Professional ratings
Review scores
Source	Rating
Allmusic	link

Royal Son of Ethiopia is reggae singer Sizzla's sixth studio album, released on Greensleeves on June 22, 1999. As on his previous record, Freedom Cry, fellow conscious reggae singer Jepther McClymont, alias Luciano, is featured on one track, this time on "In this Time". The songs are written by Miguel Collins, alias Sizzla, and voiced over riddims provided by Philipp "Fattis" Burell of Xterminator, Lowell "Sly" Dunbar and Donald Dennis.

== Track listing ==
1. "As in the Beginning" (Burrell, Collins, Dunbar) – 4:13
2. "Eastern Mountain" (Burrell, Collins, Dennis, Dunbar) – 3:47
3. "In This Time" (Burrell, Collins, Dennis, Dunbar, McClymont) – 3:48
4. "Ripe Leaf" (Burrell, Collins, Dennis, Dunbar) – 3:56
5. "Burn Dem Turf" (Burrell, Collins, Dennis, Dunbar) – 3:54
6. "What Does It Worth?" (Burrell, Collins, Dennis, Dunbar) – 3:33
7. "A Wah Dat?" (Burrell, Collins, Dunbar) – 3:57
8. "Babylon Homework" (Burrell, Collins, Dunbar) – 3:42
9. "Oh Children" (Burrell, Collins, Dunbar) – 4:06
10. "Break Free" (Burrell, Collins, Dunbar) – 3:59
11. "Mental Chains" – 3:48
12. "True Hearts" – 3:33
13. "A Wah Dat?" (Remix) (Burrell, Collins, Dunbar) – 3:55
