= Be I Strong =

Studio album by Sizzla
- Released: November 2, 1999
- Genre: Reggae, dancehall
- Label: VP
- Producer: Philip "Fatis" Burrell

Sizzla chronology
Royal Son of Ethiopia (1999)	Be I Strong (1999)	Liberate Yourself (2000)

Professional ratings
Review scores
Source	Rating
Allmusic	link

Be I Strong is Jamaican reggae singer Sizzla's seventh studio album. It was released on VP Records on November 2, 1999. All songs were written by Sizzla, except for the collaboration with Capleton on "The Vibes". The record was produced by Philip "Fatis" Burrell.

== Track listing ==
1. "Men & People"
2. "Love Is All"
3. "Diamond & Pearl"
4. "Bless Bless"
5. "Stop the Youth"
6. "Live & Learn"
7. "Mi King"
8. "Be I Strong"
9. "The Vibes" (featuring Capleton)
10. "Get Lively"
11. "No Chance"
12. "Live Longer"
13. "Powerful"
14. "Nah Suffer"
15. "Stop Violate"
16. "Keep Out a Bad Company"

== Personnel ==
- Winston Bowen - guitar
- Philip "Fatis" Burrell - producer
- Joel Chin - mastering
- Paul Daley - engineer
- Donald Dennis - bass guitar, guitar, piano, drums, keyboards
- Sly Dunbar - drums
- Dean Fraser - saxophone
- Solgie Hamilton - mixing
- Paul "Jazzwad" Yebuah - bass guitar, piano, drums
- Robert Lyn - piano
- Malachi - drums
- Julien "Frenchie" Massonnet - artwork
- Christopher Meredith - bass guitar, keyboards
- George "Dusty" Miller - drums
- Mr. Chung - artwork
- Ronald "Nambo" Robinson - trombone
- Paul Shields - mastering
- Skoolaz - engineer
- Earl "Chinna" Smith - guitar
- Stephen Stanley - keyboards, mixing
