= Screwdriver (disambiguation) =

A screwdriver is a device specifically designed to insert and tighten, or to loosen and remove, screws

The term screwdriver may refer to:

- Screwdriver (cocktail), a cocktail made with orange juice and vodka
- Screwdriver (musician), Jamaican reggae musician
- "Screwdriver", a song by The White Stripes from their 1999 album The White Stripes
- "Screwdriver (song), a song by American southern rock band Jackyl from their 2012 album Best in Show
- The Screwdriver, a 1941 cartoon short starring Woody Woodpecker

== See also ==
- Skrewdriver, a neo-Nazi band formed in 1976
