= Soul Deep =

Soul Deep may refer to

- Soul Deep (Jimmy Barnes album), 1991
- Soul Deep (Sizzla album), 2005
- Soul Deep, an album by Noora Noor, 2009
- "Soul Deep" (The Box Tops song), 1969
- "Soul Deep" (Roxette song), 1987
- "Soul Deep", a song by the Council Collective, 1984
