= Bobby Digital =

Bobby Digital may refer to:

- Bobby Digital (Jamaican producer), Jamaican dancehall producer
- Bobby Digital or RZA (born 1969), American rapper and music producer
