= Greensleeves Rhythm Album 34: Masterpiece =

Greensleeves Rhythm Album #34: Masterpiece

Compilation album by Various artists
- Released: December 10, 2002
- Recorded: 2002
- Genre: Dancehall
- Label: Greensleeves
- Producer: Steven "Lenky" Marsden

Various artists chronology
Mad Ants (2002)	Greensleeves Rhythm Album #34: Masterpiece (2002)	Clappas (2002)

Professional ratings
Review scores
Source	Rating
Allmusic	link

Greensleeves Rhythm Album #34: Masterpiece is an album in Greensleeves Records' rhythm album series. It was released in December 2002 on CD and LP. The album features various artists recorded over the "Masterpiece" riddim. The riddim was produced by Steven "Lenky" Marsden for 40/40 Productions. The riddim was Marsden's first since the hugely successful Diwali riddim earlier in 2002. It featured the hit "Ever Blazin'" by Sean Paul.

== Track listing ==
1. "Give Her It Good" - Elephant Man
2. "Ever Blazin'" - Sean Paul
3. "10 Out of 10" - Beenie Man
4. "Wine Baby Wine" - Danny English & Egg Nog
5. "Raging Storm" - Bounty Killer
6. "Check Yourself" - Wayne Marshall
7. "So Fly" - Chico
8. "Dat She Like" - Spragga Benz
9. "Uh Huh" - Mr. Vegas
10. "Rock Me" - Crissy D
11. "Stress Free" - Bling Dawg
12. "Shake It" - Zumjay
13. "The Answer" - Assassin
14. "The Mirror" - Degree
15. "Critical" - Aisha
16. "Anything You Wear" - Lexxus
17. "That Girl" - T.O.K.
18. "Price Tag" - Buccaneer
19. "Own Man" - Tanya Stephens
20. "Have Some Fun" - Desperado
21. "Real Good" - Hawkeye
22. "Masterpiece 2.5" - Steven "Lenky" Marsden
