= Greensleeves Rhythm Album 2: Virus =

Greensleeves Rhythm Album #2: Virus

Compilation album by Various artists
- Released: March 21, 2000
- Recorded: 2000
- Genre: Dancehall
- Label: Greensleeves
- Producer: Mikey Williams; Tony Thomas; Delon Reid

Various artists chronology
Bellyas (2000)	Greensleeves Rhythm Album #2: Virus (2000)	Doorslam (2000)

Professional ratings
Review scores
Source	Rating
Allmusic	link

Greensleeves Rhythm Album #2: Virus is an album in Greensleeves Records' rhythm album series. It was released in March 2000 on CD and LP. The album features various artists recorded over the "Virus" riddim, produced by the Madd Dawgz production team of Mikey Williams, Tony Thomas, and Delon Reid. The riddim contains elements of the international hit Baby One More Time by Britney Spears. Virus riddim is a riddim.

== Track listing ==
1. "Caan Hold We Dung" - Capleton
2. "Itsy Bitsy" - Mr. Vegas
3. "Monkeys Out" - Lexxus
4. "Gal To Man" - Mad Cobra
5. "Mr. Riggi Up" - Degree
6. "Go Look A Life" - Elephant Man
7. "Kerry-Ann" - Red Rat
8. "Bun" - Hawkeye
9. "My Youth" - Madd Anju
10. "Dem Gal Yah" - Kiprich
11. "Ghetto Ride" - Egg Nog
12. "Stop Who" - Alley Cat
13. "No Dyke" - Foxy Cat
14. "I Want It That Way" - Delon
15. "Money Man A Look" - Goofy
16. "Dutty Behaviour" - Major Sample
17. "Bling Bling" - Frassman
18. "Virus Jugglin' Megamix" - various
