= I Get High (disambiguation) =

I Get High is commonly associated with American rapper Styles P's 2002 single "Good Times"

I Get High may also refer to:

- "I Get High (On Your Memory)", a song by Freda Payne from Stares and Whispers
- "I Get High", a song by Aretha Franklin from Sparkle (1976)
- "I Get High", a song by Madder Lake from The Best of Madder Lake (1978)
- "I Get High", a song by The Whitlams from Undeniably The Whitlams (1994)
- "I Get High", a song by Dada from El Subliminoso (1996)
- "I Get High", a song by Memphis Bleek from The Understanding (2002)
- "I Get High", a song by Fastball from Keep Your Wig On (2004)
- "I Get High", a song by Lloyd Banks from The Hunger for More (2004)
- "I Get High", a song by Young Gotti from Same Day, Different Shit (2006)
- "I Get High", a song by Joss Stone from Colour Me Free! (2009)
- "I Get High", a 1995 single by Upstate
- "I Get High", a 2005 single by DJ Disciple

== See also ==
- "I Get High on You", a song by Sly Stone from High on You (1975)
- "I Get High Lovin' You", a song by Brady Seals from Brady Seals (1998)
- "Every Time You Touch Me (I Get High)", a song by Charlie Rich from Every Time You Touch Me (1975)
- "Yes I Get High", a song by Sizzla from Rastafari Teach I Everything (2001)
- "We Get High", a song by Fabolous from The S.O.U.L. Tape 2 (2012)
- "I Want to Hold Your Hand", a 1963 single by The Beatles
