= Bobo Ashanti (album) =

Studio album by Sizzla
- Released: August 31, 2000 (LP); September 5, 2000 (CD)
- Genres: Reggae, dancehall
- Label: Greensleeves
- Producer: Philip "Fatis" Burrell

Sizzla chronology
Words of Truth (2000)	Bobo Ashanti (2000)	Taking Over (2001)

Professional ratings
Review scores
Source	Rating
Allmusic	3/5 stars
Tom Hull – on the Web	B+

Bobo Ashanti is the tenth studio album by the Jamaican reggae singer Sizzla, released by Greensleeves Records on August 31, 2000. The album, written by Sizzla and produced by Philip "Fatis" Burrell, peaked at #6 on the Billboard top reggae album charts and addresses themes of the Bobo Ashanti branch of the Rastafari movement.

== Track listing ==
1. "The World" (Burell, Collins, Dennis, Miller) – 4:36
2. "Courage" (Burrell, Collins, Dennis) – 3:50
3. "Whether or not" (Burnell, Collins, Dennis) – 3:45
4. "Grow U Locks" (Burrell, Collins, Dennis, Dunbar) – 3:24
5. "This Day" (Burrell, Collins, Dennis, Edmund, Staff) – 4:09
6. "Attack" (Burrell, Collins, Dennis) – 3:33
7. "Glorify" (Burrell, Collins, Miller) – 3:54
8. "Wicked Naw Go Prosper" (Burrell, Collins, Wynter) – 4:03
9. "Good Looking" (Burrell, Collins, Dennis) – 3:28
10. "Do Good" (Burrell, Collins, Dennis) – 3:49
11. "Strength & Hope" (Burrell, Collins, Wynter) – 3:30
12. "Children Beware" (Burrell, Collins, Dennis, Miller) – 3:35
13. "Must Rise" (Burrell, Collins, Wynter) – 3:34

== Personnel ==
- Paul Daley – engineer
- Donald Dennis – bass guitar, guitar
- Mark Harrison – engineer
- Tony McDermott – design
- Garfield McDonald – mixing
- Chris Meredith – bass guitar
- Kevin Metcalfe – mastering
- J. Miller – drums
- Robert Murphy – engineer, mixing
- William Richards – photography
- David Rowe – mixing
- Nigel Staff – keyboards
- Stephen Stanley – keyboards, mixing
- Toby Whelan – engineer
- Collin "Bulbie" York – mixing
