= Child of the Universe =

Child of the Universe may refer to:

== Music ==
- "A Child of the Universe Op. 80", a 1971 composition by Wilfred Josephs

=== Albums ===
- Child of the Universe (album), a 2012 album by Delta Goodrem
- Child of the Universe, a 2009 album by Screwdriver

=== Songs ===
- "Child of the Universe", a 1974 single by Barclay James Harvest from Everyone Is Everybody Else
- "Child of the Universe", a 1969 song by The Byrds from Dr. Byrds & Mr. Hyde
- "Child of the Universe", a 1999 single by DJ Taucher
- "Child of the Universe", a song by Robyn Hitchcock from the 1991 album Perspex Island
- "Desiderata", a song on Les Crane's 1971 album Desiderata, which repeats in its chorus "You are a child of the universe"

== See also ==
- Children of the Universe (disambiguation)
