= Mr. Lexx =

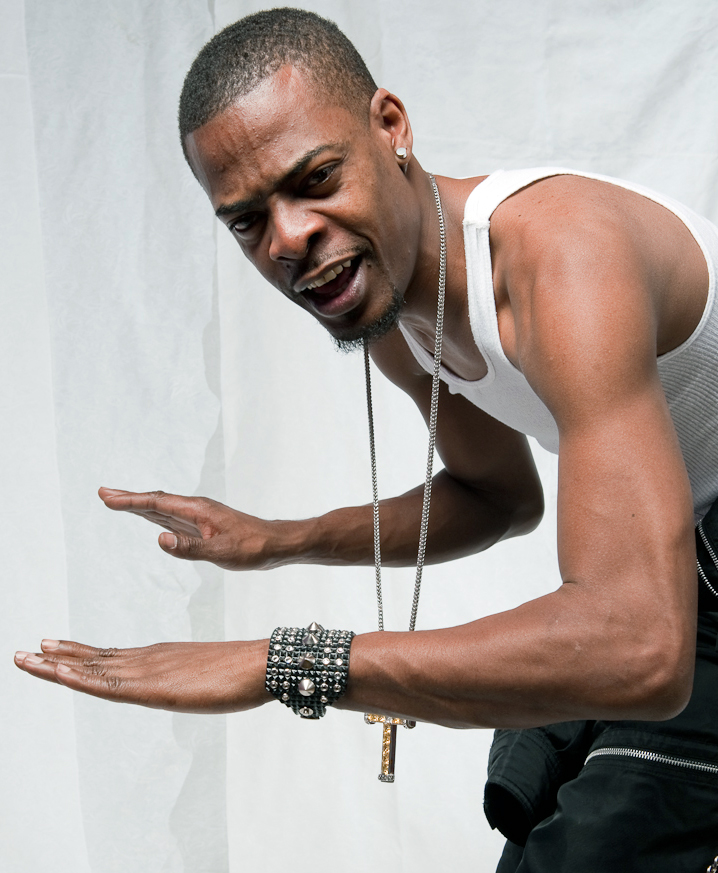
- Mr. Lexx in 2010

Background information
- Also known as: Lexxus, Mr. Lex, Jigga Man, Dag Diggy, The Prince
- Born: Christopher George Palmer; 11 May 1974 (age 51)
- Origin: Kingston, Jamaica
- Genres: Reggae, dancehall, Reggae Fusion, EDM
- Occupations: Entertainer, songwriter, deejay, producer
- Years active: Late 1992–present
- Label: Independent

Christopher George Palmer (born 11 May 1974), better known as Mr. Lexx, "Lexxus" or simply "The Prince" is a Jamaican dancehall artist from East Kingston, Jamaica. He is known for the success of his debut album entitled Mr. Lex on the Billboard Reggae Chart and for his collaboration with Wayne Wonder on a track titled "Anything goes" which also featured American rap duo Capone-N-Noreaga for the Red Star Sounds : Def Jamaica compilation, which received a Grammy nomination for best reggae album.

== Biography ==
Born Christopher Palmer, Mr. Lexx formerly Lexxus emerged on the scene in the late 1990s. He was once signed to VP Records has a string of hits, including "Hold the line" featuring Santigold produced by Diplo/Switch project Major Lazer, which was nominated for a 2009 MTV "Best Breakthru" Video Music Award, "Anything Goes" with Def Jam Recording artist Capone-N-Noreaga and Wayne Wonder, Get Wid It – Make Some Money, Divine Reasoning, Prayer, Good Hole, Full Hundred, Ring Mi Cellie, Cook, Stress, Clothes A Nuh Yuh Problem, Halla Halla, Let Those Monkeys Out, War Start, You Bring It, Video Light and Taxi Fare featuring Mr Vegas and SPY featuring Flexx from (TOK).

== Early years ==
A former student at Kingston's (now defunct) Fox Drama School, Mr. Lexx is an actor who has appeared in several plays and earned a Best Actor award in 1992. Mr. Lexx also joined the popular dance troupe Squad One but for the past seven years he has pursued a career as a deejay whose stage performances are enhanced by his experience in dance and theater.

Mr. Lexx first displayed his deejaying skills in 1992 at the popular Sunday night dances held in Kingston's Harbor View area, featuring the Super Dee sound system. Representatives from The New York-based label Natural Bridge Records heard Lexx's impressive lyrical flow and brought him to Kingston's Mixing Lab recording studios where the 16-year-old recorded his first single, "Own A Home", his tribute to women who are not dependent on men for financial support. Subsequent single releases including "Unification" and "Ghetto Man Slam" yielded little fanfare for the aspiring deejay but he persevered and in 1997 his efforts were rewarded with three hit singles, "Runaway Train" (X-Rated label), "Fade Away" (2-Hard Records) and "Boogie Woogie" for producers Steely & Clevie.

Lexx's popularity lagged in Jamaica due to the time he spent abroad, so he returned home in 1998 and reestablished himself through a series of stage shows, utilizing his acting and dancing capabilities to support his microphone skills at Kingston's largest annual dancehall concert, Sting, in December 1998. He performed in August 1999 during Montego Bay's Reggae Sumfest Dancehall Night. Attired in a leather outfit, Mr. Lexx delivered a set including his first No. 1 single "Get Wid It", produced by King Jammy, "Yu Nah", another No. 1 and his later "Cook", which humorously urges women to brush up on their culinary skills to keep their men happy. Both tracks were produced by Steely and Clevie.

== Billboard Chart ==
In 2000, Mr. Lexx released an album called Mr. Lex that spent five weeks on the Billboard Reggae Chart and peaked at number twelve.

== Discography ==
=== Studio albums ===
| Title | Release date | Label | Format |
|---|---|---|---|
| Mr. Lexx | 13 June 2000 | VP Records | Compact Disc |

Vinyl singles (7 inch)

- 1998: Fade Away (2 Hard Recordings)
- 2000: Dem Gal (Mr. Lexx, Capleton, Sizzla Kalonji) (Annex)
- 2000: Mad Dem Bun Dem (Cali Bud)
- 2000: Go Dung So (CJ Records)
- 2000: Leave You ( Dé Javù Productions)
- 2000: The Weed (Springvale Music)
- 2000: Full Hundred (B-Rich Records)
- 2000: You (Shocking Vibes)
- 2000: Who the F**k (Mentally Disturbed Vinyls)
- 2000: Resolution (M.A.D. Records (3))
- 2000: Bounce A Gal (Annex)
- 2000: When I Man Cry (Shines Productions)
- 2000: One And Move (Spragga Roots)
- 2000: Bless It Up (Ras-I Records)
- 2000: War List (Annex)
- 2000: A We Say (Mr. Lexx, Elephant Man, Merciless)(Annex)
- 2000: Si Mi Gi Mi (Annex)
- 2001: Why (Mr. Lex and Vegas)(Fat Eyes Records)
- 2001: La La La La La ( Studio 2000)
- 2001: Cool Her Shelf (KBC Music)
- 2001: Do As I Say (King Of Kings)
- 2001: Good Looks (Desulme Productions)
- 2001: Yuh Bring It (2 Hard Recordings)
- 2001: Walk Around (De Javu Productions)
- 2001: Kick Out Yu Foot (M-Phatic)
- 2001: Move On (featuring Lady Saw)(De Javu Productions
- 2001: Gwane Trace (VP Records)
- 2001: Let It Go (I & I Foundation Records)
- 2001: Top Gal (Desulme Productions)
- 2001: Move A Gal (Stand Out Muzik)
- 2001: Log On (Big Life Muzik)
- 2001: Nah Go Down Deh (Energy Production (2))
- 2002: Gimme A Minute (Colin Fat Records)
- 2002: One Man (Common Sense)
- 2002: Grades (Fire Ball Records)
- 2002: Dem No Like Mi (Steely & Clevie Records)
- 2002: Hotness (Coram's Production)
- 2002: Dem Nuh Hot (John Shop Records)
- 2002: This One For The Girls (Royal Blend)
- 2002: Things A Gwaan (VP Records)
- 2002: Weed (Tan-Yah)
- 2002: Slam (Topaz Records)
- 2002: Its On (Tony Curtis & Mr. Lexx)(Rattler Records)
- 2003: Wuk Dem Gal (Creation Star Music)
- 2003: Shake It (Maximum Sound)
- 2003: See Dem A Come (Golden Cartel Records)
- 2003: Murder (Eggnog & Mr. Lexx )(357 Records)
- 2003: That’s The Way (featuring Mr. Vegas )(Super Hype)
- 2003: No (Stone Love)
- 2003: Who Da Gal Deh (Vikings Production)
- 2003: Clothes Bill (Freedom Trail)
- 2004: Badman Way (Maximum Sound)
- 2004: Bad Mind (Abijazz Music)
- 2004: Punchline (Loony Bin Records)
- 2004: Gawn Worldwide (Hands & Heart)
- 2004: Oh Oh (Big Jeans Records)
- 2005: Never Get Me Down (S & B Productions)
- 2005: Clowning (Studio 2000)
- 2006: Dem Nuh More Dan Yu (Yellow Moon Records)
- 2006: Cut Eye Cut Eye (TJ Records)
- 2006: All These Girls (Wayne Marshall, Mr. Lexx & Anthony B)(Supertronics Muzic)
- 2006: Duh Suh (Chalwa)
- 2006: Something fi Chat / Kick Out Foot (Black Chiney Records)
- 2006: We Hot (Big Ship)
- 2007: Nuh Good (Kirkledove Records)
- 2007: Real Bad Man (Stampede Productions)
- 2008: Watch Me (Romie featuring Mr. Lexx)(Bacchanal 45 Records)
- 2012: Move (Basiq Records)

Vinyl singles (7 inch) with unknown release dates

- : Big Up Mi Fren Dem (Quality Mix Records)
- : Quit (RMC Records)
- : Independent Lady (KT Records)
- : Good Hole A Do It (Hype Ting)
- : Chocolate Loving (featuring Nydean Levy)(G-String Production)
- : Money Pull Up (Gold Spoon Productions)
- : Love In Her Soul (Coppershot Music)
- : Hush (Beat Ruut Music)
- : Hottest Thing (PG Music)
- : Gwann Home (Fat Eyes Records)
- : Wet Now (Real Music (2))
- : Ease Of War & Crime ( Hip Hop Remix ) (Special Remix)
- : Top Gal (Cartell)
- : We Say Party (Fresh Ear)

== Appearances ==
Table showing appearances on LP Record and CD Compilations
| Artist | Title | Song/s | Release date | Label | Format |
|---|---|---|---|---|---|
| Various Artists | Riddim Driven - Real Sex | Full Hundred | 2000 | VP Records | LP |
| Various Artists | Riddim Driven - Trilogy Pt. 2 & Ole Sore | I Don't Care | 2001 | VP Records | LP, CD |
| Various Artists | Riddim Driven - Candle Wax | Straighter Than Arrow | 2001 | VP Records | LP, CD |
| Various Artists | Riddim Driven - Nine Night | Gwaan Trace | 2001 | VP Records | LP, CD |
| Various Artists | Riddim Driven - Scare Crow | We Dat | 2001 | VP Records | LP, CD |
| Various Artists | Riddim Driven - White Liva | I Love You | 2002 | VP Records | LP, CD |
| Various Artists | Riddim Driven - Diesel | It's On | 2002 | VP Records | LP, CD |
| Various Artists | Riddim Rider Vol.4 Sweat | Dat Mi Seh | 2002 | Charm | Double LP |
| Various Artists | Riddim Driven - Tabla | Hush | 2002 | VP Records | LP |
| Various Artists | Riddim Driven - Hi Fever | Big Chat | 2002 | VP Records | Double LP |
| Various Artists | Riddim Driven - Washout | One Man | 2003 | VP Records, Q45 | LP, CD |
| Various Artists | Riddim Driven - Tai Chi | Can You Hear Me Now | 2003 | VP Records | LP, CD |
| Various Artists | Riddim Driven - Adrenaline | High Top | 2003 | VP Records | Double LP |
| Various Artists | Riddim Driven - Diggy Diggy | Boy Like We | 2003 | VP Records | Double LP |
| Various Artists | Riddim Driven - 44 Flat | Dem Nuh like Mi | 2003 | VP Records | Double LP |
| Various Artists | Turban & Robe Riddim | Who Dah Gal Deh | 2003 | Vikings Production | Double LP |
| Various Artists | Lime Key Riddim | Gal Dem Want One | 2003 | Builders | Double LP |
| Various Artists | Riddim Driven - Coolie Skank | (We Roll),(Taxi) | 2003 | VP Records | Double LP |
| Various Artists | Riddim Driven - Project X | Survive | 2004 | VP Records | Double LP |
| Various Artists | Ice Cold Riddim Makatak | Keep It Low | 2004 | Penitentiary Records | LP, CD |
| Various Artists | Riddim Driven - Flava | Gal U Neva | 2004 | VP Records | LP, CD |
| Various Artists | Riddim Rider Vol. 17 Chronic | Gawn World Wide | 2004 | Charm | Double LP |
| Various Artists | Ultimate Dance Hall | Through Yo Cute | 2004 | Kingston Records | LP |
| Various Artists | Riddim Buster Volume 1: Who Cares Rhythm | Notten Nah Gwaan | 2004 | Insight(2) | Double LP, CD |
| Various Artists | Riddim Driven - Riddim Rider Vol. 15 Fir$t Cla$$ | One Man | 2004 | Charm | Double LP |
| Various Artists | Riddim Driven - Applause | Hype If U Wanna | 2005 | VP Records | LP, CD |
| Various Artists | Riddim Driven - Old Truck | Clowning | 2005 | VP Records | LP |
| Various Artists | Riddim Driven - Ruckus | Booty Clap | 2005 | VP Records | Double LP |

Mixtapes

- 2010: Lex-I-con
- 2013: The Europe Take Over
- 2014: Mr Lexx 20 in 30
