= Praise Ye Jah =

Studio album by Sizzla
- Released: October 21, 1997
- Genre: Reggae
- Label: Xterminator
- Producer: Philip "Fatis" Burrell

Sizzla chronology
Black Woman & Child (1997)	Praise Ye Jah (1997)	Freedom Cry/Kalonji (1998)

Professional ratings
Review scores
Source	Rating
Allmusic	link

Praise Ye Jah is Jamaican reggae singer Sizzla's third studio album. It was released on Xterminator on October 21, 1997. The songs were written by Sizzla and produced by Philip "Fatis" Burrell.

== Track listing ==
1. "Praise Ye Jah" – 3:53
2. "Dem a Wonder" – 4:01
3. "Homeless" – 4:03
4. "Blackness" – 3:59
5. "Inna Dem Face" – 3:46
6. "Give Thanks" – 4:20
7. "Hail Selassie" – 3:54
8. "No Other Like Jah" – 3:53
9. "How Dem Flex" – 3:59
10. "Cowboy" – 3:46
11. "Greedy Joe" – 3:40
12. "Did You Ever" – 3:52
13. "Government" – 3:47
