= Greensleeves Rhythm Album 85: Inspector =

Greensleeves Rhythm Album #85: Inspector

Compilation album by Various artists
- Released: 2006
- Recorded: 2006
- Genre: Dancehall
- Label: Greensleeves
- Producer: Damani 'DJ Karim' Thompson

Various artists chronology
Twice Again (2006)	Greensleeves Rhythm Album #85: Inspector (2006)	Ghetto Whiskey (2006)

Professional ratings
Review scores
Source	Rating
Allmusic	2.5/5 stars

Greensleeves Rhythm Album #85: Inspector is an album in Greensleeves Records' rhythm album series. It was released July 2006 on CD and LP. The album features various artists recorded over the "Inspector" riddim produced by Damani "DJ Karim" Thompson for Stainless Records.

== Track listing ==
1. "Haffi Get It (Nah Rape)" - Sizzla
2. "Real Gangsters" - Elephant Man
3. "Uptown Story" - Supahype
4. "My Highness" - Busy Signal
5. "Nah Switch" - Vybz Kartel
6. "Champion" - Lady Saw
7. "Sitten Tight" - Mad Cobra
8. "Far We Come From" - Bounty Killer
9. "We Don't Play" - Mavado
10. "Who?" - Vybz Kartel ft. Supahype
11. "We A Gangsta" - Dr. Evil
12. "Unpredictable" - Bling Dawg
13. "Weed We Smoke" - Kid Kurrupt
14. "We Nuh Play" - Ward 21
15. "Gimme The Girls" - Icecold
16. "Nah Taste" - Macka Diamond
17. "Badman Story" - Zumjay
18. "Calling All Girls" - Monster Twins
19. "Turn Up The Bassline" - Munga & Jah Melo
20. "Wooo!!!!" - Jagwa
21. "Informer" - Tornado
22. "Oh Yeah" - Tanto Marijuanna
23. "Inspector Rhythm" - DJ Karim
