= Jahvillani =

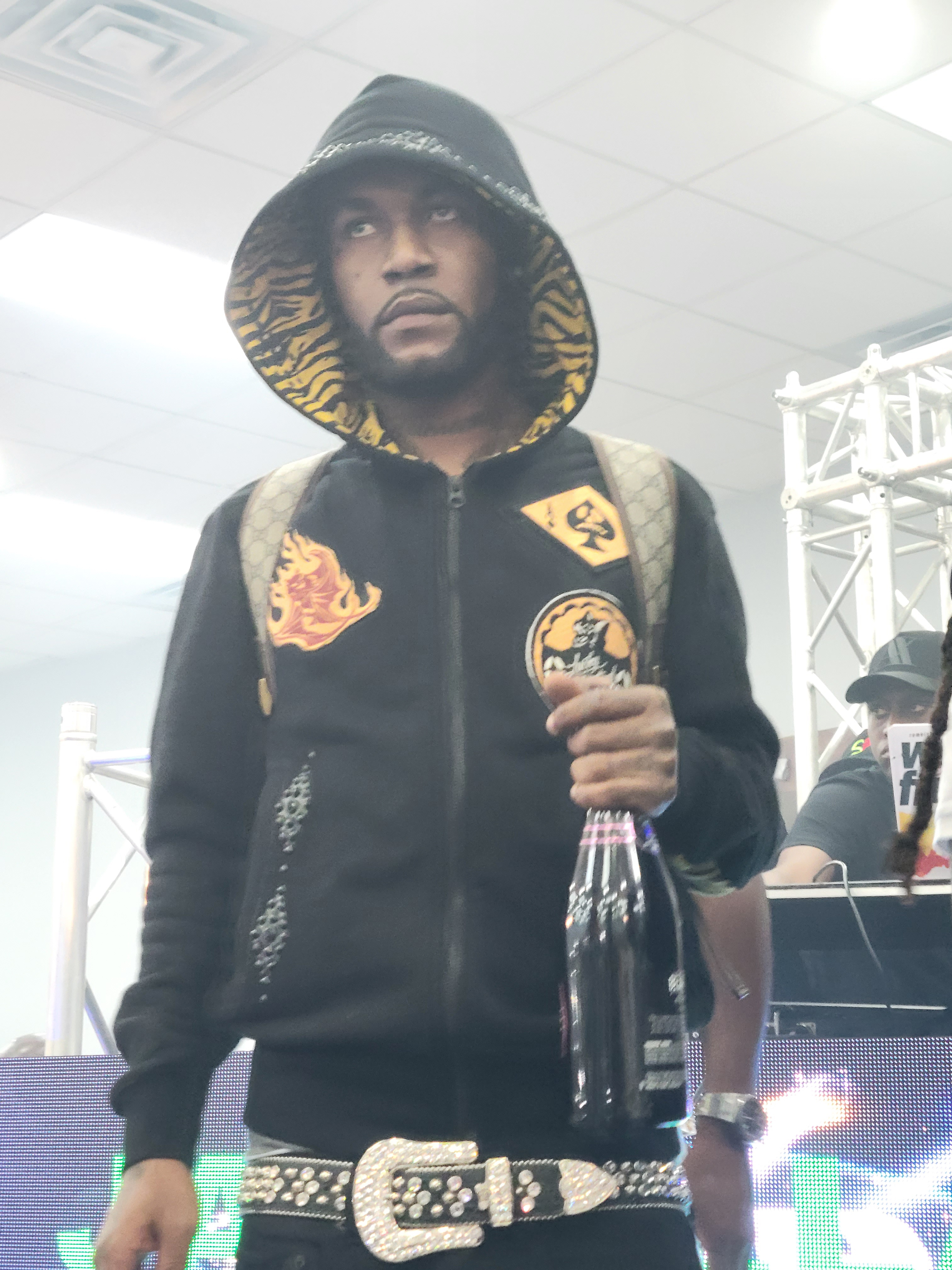
- Jahvillani in 2022

Background information
- Born: Dujon Mario Edwards; 8 September 1994 (age 31); Ocho Rios, Jamaica
- Genres: Dancehall, Reggae
- Occupations: Musician, deejay
- Years active: 2013–present
- Labels: VP Records, YGF Records
- Website: Jahvillani Official Website

Jahvillani, born Dujon Mario Edwards (8 September 1994), is a Jamaican and dancehall artist from Great Pond, St. Ann, a parish in Jamaica. He has two sisters and was raised by a single parent.

== Biography ==
As a student, Jahvillani started writing verses. He decided that he would perform under the moniker "Jahvillani," a name forged through thinking about balance. He grew up listening to dancehall stars such as Buju Banton, Vybz Kartel, Mavado and Sizzla, and he was heavily influenced by Buju Banton, Vybz Kartel and Shabba Ranks, and also a book The 48 Laws of Power. Jahvillani decided to pursue a career in music right after high school which was in 2011, and started voicing on tracks around 2013. His first songs, "Badda Dan Dem" was released in 2013. It was produced by YGF Records, a St.Ann record label. Jahvillani is best known for his hits "Wileside Government," "Clarks Pon Foot," "Nuh Reason," "Weh Dem Ago Do," and "Rubberband". Jahvillani is expected to release his first EP, Dirt To Bentley this year. The first single from the EP, "First Class Flight" featuring Prince Swanny, premiered on Complex in June 2020. The EP "Dirt to Bentley" was expanded into an album comprising 13 tracks and was released on July 9, 2021.

== Discography ==
=== Album ===
Dirt To Bentley (VP, 2021)

=== Singles ===
==== As lead artist ====
- "Badda Dan Dem" (2013)
- "Tek On The Streets" (2014)
- "Nah Ramp Wid Yuh Gyall" (2014)
- "How Mi Suh Bad" (2014)
- "Inna Di City" (2015)
- "Fall In Love" (2015)
- "Money" (2015)
- "Mouth Badman" (2015)
- "Heartless Killers" (2015)
- "Get Rich Or Die Trying" (2016)
- "Fi Mi Something " (2016)
- "Fi Di Gyal Dem" (2016)
- "Bad Fi Real" (2016)
- "Naffi Ask Dat" (2016)
- "Wine Weh Yuh Have" (2016)
- "Touch The Medal" (2016)
- "Life A The Greatest" (2016)
- "Jesus" (2017)
- "Nuh Reason" (2018)
- "The Dream" (2019)
- "Big Time" (2019)
- "No Rate Dem" (2019)
- "Same Stories" (2019)
- "Weh Dem Ago Duh" (2019)
- "Wile Side Gad" (2019)
- "Style So Sick" (2019)
- "People" (2019)
- "Clarks Pon Foot" (2019)
- "Nuh Beg Friend" (2019)
- "Bad Clarks And Blue Jeans" (2019)
- "Roll Up" (2019)
- "Rubber Band" (2020)
- "Guh To Work" (2020)
- "Clear the Way" (2020)
- "Neva Seh Neva" (2020)
- "Fire Works" (2020)
- "Up Stairs" (2020)
- "Suede Clarks" (2020)
- "Don't Rush" (2020)
- "Dark Emortions" (2020)
- "Million Dollars" (2020)
- "Chargie" (2020
- "Gyal Gad" (2020)
- "Smooth" feat. Skillibeng (2020)
- "Dangerous" feat. Jada Kingdom (2020)
