= Give Me a Try =

Give Me a Try may refer to:

- "Give Me a Try" (song), by The Wombats, 2015
- "Give Me a Try", a song by Higgs and Wilson
- "Give Me a Try", a song by Ivo Grīsniņš Grīslis that competed to represent Latvia in the Eurovision Song Contest 2013
- "Give Me a Try", a song by Michelle Gayle
- "Give Me a Try", a song by Sizzla from Rise to the Occasion
