= Pinchers =

Jamaican musician (born 1965)

- Also known as: Pinchers
- Born: Delroy Thompson; 19 November 1965 (age 60)
- Origin: Jamaica
- Genres: Reggae
- Label: VP Records

Delroy Thompson (born 19 November 1965), better known by his stage name Pinchers, is a Jamaican reggae and dancehall artist.

== Career ==
He released his first album as a teenager in Jamaica for Blue Trac Records, before briefly moving to the UK in 1985. Pinchers made his first hits in 1986 with "Borrow No Gun", which he released through King Jammy, "Abrakabra", "Eat Man", and "Jailhouse Hot". Pinchers gained fame with the single "Agony", from the album of the same name produced by King Jammy. In the same year, he recorded the Mass Out album, produced by Philip "Fatis" Burrell and backed by Sly & Robbie, Jackie Mittoo and Robbie Lyn, among others.

In 1990, he released "Bandelero", which became his signature tune. It was later part of the soundtrack for the movie Shottas. He continued with hits through the mid-1990s, including "Carpenter", "Send Another One Come" and "Venti Uno" with Bounty Killer.

Pinchers continues to record music and perform concerts, where he is known for his elaborate outfits. He states his name was a continuation of other Jamaican artists in the 1980s named after carpentry tools such as Pliers, Screwdriver and Tenor Saw.

== Personal life ==
In January 2015, he was among a group of men who were shot at in Queenborough, Jamaica; two men were killed and Thompson was hit in his left arm, breaking two bones.

Thompson has a daughter Deyanah Martin-Thompson born October 1992. She is the longtime partner of Stoke City player Daniel Johnson. He has 12 children in total (8 daughters and 4 sons).

== Discography ==
- Can't Take the Pressure (1986), Blue Trac Records/Blue Mountain Records
- Agony (1987), Live & Love
- Mass Out (1987), Exterminator/Ras
- Lift It Up Again (1987), Exterminator/Vena
- Got to Be Me (1987), Live & Love
- Dancehall Duo (1988), RAS - with Frankie Paul
- Turbo Charge (1988), Super Supreme - with Frankie Paul
- Pinchers with Pliers (1988), Black Scorpio - with Pliers
- Return of the Don (1989), Supreme
- Pinchers Meets Sanchez (1989), Exterminator - with Sanchez
- Two Originals (1990), King Dragon - with Tweetie Bird
- Hotter (1992), Blue Mountain
- Dirt Low (1993), Exterminator/VP
- If You Love Me Girl (1995), Trojan - with Frankie Paul
- Get Close (2002), Artists Only

Compilation appearances

- Worries and Problems (1986), Positive Musik - Pinchers, Scully Brown, Teddy Brown, Jah Wayne, Johnny P, Colourman and Little John
