= Burning Up (album) =

Burning up

Studio album by Sizzla
- Released: September 5, 1995
- Genre: Roots reggae Reggae
- Label: RAS
- Producer: Philip "Fatis" Burrell

Sizzla chronology
Burning up (1995)	Black Woman & Child (1997)

Professional ratings
Review scores
Source	Rating
Allmusic	3/5 stars

Burning Up is the debut roots-style reggae album by Sizzla. It was released on September 5, 1995, on the Jamaican label RAS. All songs were written by Sizzla and produced by Philip "Fatis" Burrell.

== Track listing ==
No.	Title	Length
1.	"How Much"	3:58
2.	"Can't Hurt the Mind"	3:44
3.	"The Poor"	3:49
4.	"Mothers of Nations"	4:12
5.	"Search Fi Hardcore"	3:47
6.	"Nah Give In"	4:00
7.	"You Are What You Are"	3:51
8.	"Gun Ting Don't Pay"	3:35
9.	"Dis Gangstar"	4:05
10.	"We Want Love"	4:03
11.	"Dreams"	4:19
12.	"It's Not Over"	3:47
