= Greensleeves Rhythm Album 40: Egyptian =

Greensleeves Rhythm Album #40: Egyptian

Compilation album by Various artists
- Released: 2003
- Recorded: 2003
- Genre: Dancehall
- Label: Greensleeves
- Producer: Daniel "Blaxx" Lewis; Donovan "Vendetta" Bennett

Various artists chronology
Bad Company (2003)	Greensleeves Rhythm Album #40: Egyptian (2003)	20 Cent (2003)

Greensleeves Rhythm Album #40: Egyptian is an album in Greensleeves Records' rhythm album series. It was released in May 2003 on CD and LP. The album features various artists recorded over the "Egyptian" riddim produced by Daniel "Blaxx" Lewis and Donovan "Vendetta" Bennett.

== Track listing ==
1. "Sweet To The Belly" - Vybz Kartel
2. "Get With It Girl" - Sean Paul
3. "Egyptian Dance" - Elephant Man
4. "It's A Girl Thing" - Assassin
5. "I Will Love The Girls" - Wayne Marshall
6. "Warlord Vex" - Bounty Killer
7. "Coulda Wha" - T.O.K.
8. "Sake A Dat Gal" - Kid Kurrupt
9. "These Are The Days" - Sizzla
10. "Pure Gal" - Bling Dawg
11. "Hotties" - Degree
12. "Gal Yuh Nah" - Buccaneer
13. "Tek Them On" - Junior Kelly
14. "Just For Girls" - Regan
15. "Grind It Off" - Frisco Kid
16. "Girls In Girls Out" - Ward 21 & Determine
17. "Get Up Nuh" - Madd Anju
18. "Clean It Up" - Spragga Benz & Brigadiere
19. "Draw Wi Out" - Looga Man & Mossy Kid
20. "Egyptian Rhythm" - Donovan "Vendetta" Bennett
