= Children of the Universe (disambiguation) =

"Children of the Universe" is a 2014 song by Molly

Children of the Universe may also refer to:

== Books ==
- Kinder des Weltalls (Children of the Universe), 1970 book by scientist Hoimar von Ditfurth
- Children of the Universe, 1976 issue of Superman comic Super-Sons

== Music ==
=== Songs ===
- "Children of the Universe" – 16:42 " Carnegie Hall Concert (Toshiko Akiyoshi Jazz Orchestra)
- "Children of the Universe", song by John Denver, 1982
- "Children of the Universe", song by Dorsey Burnette, 1971
- "Children of the Universe", song by Flash, 1972
- "Children of the Universe", song by Ras Michael and Sons and Daughters, 1983

== See also ==
- Child of the Universe (disambiguation)
