= Warrior King (musician) =

Jamaican musician (b. 1979)

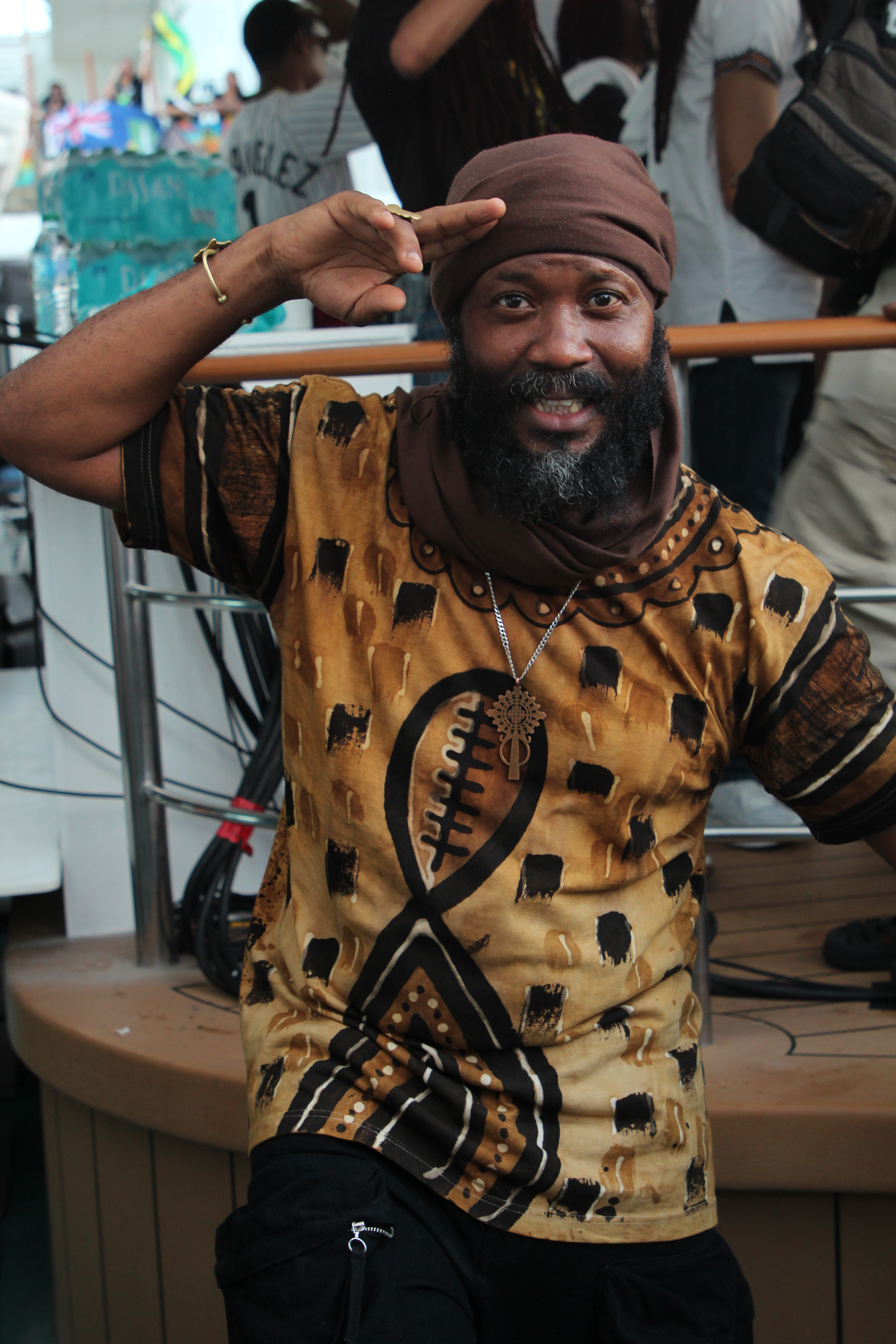
King in 2025 on the JamRock Cruise.

Warrior King (born Mark Dyer, in Kingston, Jamaica, on 27 July 1979). He is a Jamaican reggae singer known within the Caribbean and internationally for his music that is focused on messages about education and uplifting women. Some of Warrior King's best known hits include "Virtuous Woman" (2001), "Hold Da Faith" (2005), "My Life" (2005), "Can't Get Me Down" (2005) and "Wanna Give You Love" (2009). "Never Go Where Pagans Go"(2002).

== Musical career ==
Warrior King's musical career began in high school where he performed in talent shows. At that time, he followed the musical style of reggae artiste Bounty Killer.

Over time, his style evolved eventually leading to his international chart topping single Virtuous Woman in 2001 (produced by Michael "Mikey John" Johnson)for Lion Paw Productions. In October 2001, this song was # 1 on the Jamaican reggae charts, as well as, the New York Top 30 Reggae Singles chart. In 2002, his debut album Virtuous Woman was released by VP Records and spent nine weeks on the Billboard.com charts. This album included the songs Hold Da Faith and Breath of Fresh Air. Many established producers in the reggae industry contributed to this album including Sheldon 'Calibud' Stewart (Sizzla Kalonji), Lion Paw (Luciano and Junior Kelly) and Penthouse (Buju Banton and Beres Hammond).

In 2005, he released another album called Hold Da Faith whose songs were on the charts for Jamaica's Weekly Countdown and included singles such as My Life, Baby Girl, Education and Can't Get Me Down. His music became known, not only in his native Jamaica, but also Tokyo, London, New York and Africa. His 2009 album Love is in the Air featured the hit "Wanna Give You Love" which spent two weeks at the top of the Jamaica Music Countdown Top 25 Reggae Singles Chart.

In September 2011, he released a new album called Tell me how me Sound featuring songs such as Jah is the Only One and System is Crazy.

== Awards and recognition ==
In 2001 when the hit "Virtuous Woman" became well known on the international reggae scene, The Jamaica Observer declared Warrior King "one of the artists who made a difference in 2001." In 2008, the US President Barack Obama commented that Warrior King was one of his favorite reggae musicians. In August 2010, Warrior King was recognized by the United Negro Improvement Association (UNIA) Marcus Garvey Awards for his contribution to music. He continues to tour the world including Europe, South America and the United States. In April 2011, he completed a tour with renowned reggae singer Luciano, focused on raising funds for countries that recently suffered natural disasters such as Japan. In 2017, 11 June was officially declared Warrior King Day in the city of Buffalo, United States by Buffalo's mayor, Byron W. Brown. "Among his many recognitions and awards, Warrior King album, The Rootz Warrior, already has a global buzz around Ain't Giving Up ... , with each song on the album bearing a different style and feel ... . Now, therefore, be it resolved that I, Byron W. Brown, mayor of the city of Buffalo, do hereby proclaim June 11, 2017 as: Mark 'Warrior King' Dyer Day", he said.

== Personal life ==
Warrior King was born in Kingston but moved to Clarendon, Jamaica during his early years. He went to ST Andrew Technical High School(Staths)and studied Human Rights and African Awareness at St. Andrew's Technical College, and then was a mechanical engineering student at the National Tool and Engineering Institute before he changed gears to pursue his musical career. Warrior King is a devout follower of the Rastafarian faith and continues to use his music to reinforce messages about love, tolerance, education and upliftment

== Discography ==
Year	Album name	Record label	#1 Single	Chart Toppers
2002	Virtuous Woman	VP Records	Virtuous Woman	"Jah is Always There"; "Never Go where Pagans Go"; "Rough Road"; "Empress So Divine"
2005	Hold Da Faith	VP Records	Hold the Faith	"Can't get me Down"; "My Life"; "Another Love Song"
2009	Love is in the Air	Roots Warrior Records	Wanna Give You Love	"Girlfriend"; "Loneliness"; "Yesterday has Gone"; "Wanna give you Love"
2011	Tell me How me Sound	Tads Records	Tell me How me Sound	"Jah is the Only One"; "I Can See It (ft Barrington Levy)"; "System is Crazy"
2016	The Rootz Warrior	Rootz Warrior Productions/Irie Sounds International	Ain't Giving Up	"Heartbreaker (ft Richie Spice)"; "I wouldn't do that (ft Beres Hammond)"; "Rastafari Protect I"
