= Inna Di Road =

Studio album by Chezidek
- Released: September 11, 2007 (LP); September 25, 2007 (CD)
- Recorded: 2007
- Genres: Reggae, Roots Reggae
- Label: Greensleeves Records
- Producer: Bobby "Massive B" Konders

Chezidek chronology
Firm Up Yourself (2007)	Inna Di Road (2007)

Inna Di Road is the fifth major album from Jamaican Roots Reggae artist Chezidek. Inna Di Road was produced by Bobby "Massive B" Konders and distributed by Greensleeves Records in September 2007. Call Pon Dem from the album Inna Di Road is featured on the Massive B Sound system (station) in Grand Theft Auto IV and it also appears on the Official GTA IV Soundtrack.

It is available in both CD (Catalog GREL300.2) and LP (Catalog GREL300.1) formats. The two bonus MPEG video tracks are only available on the enhanced CD version.

== Track listing ==
1. "Inna Di Road"
2. "Far I"
3. "Dem a Fight We"
4. "How You So Wicked"
5. "No Fear"
6. "Me Nah Run"
7. "She Struggles"
8. "Call Pon Dem"
9. "Leave The Trees"
10. "I Won't Cry"
11. "Vampire"
12. "Trouble Maker"
13. "I Shouldn't Do That"
14. "For The Rights"
15. "Inna Di Road" (MPEG Video)
16. "Call Pon Dem" (MPEG Video)

== Sources ==
- VPReggae.com (VP Records Store) Item Detail for Inna Di Road.
