= Da Real Thing =

Studio album by Sizzla
- Released: November 19, 2002 (U.S.)
- Recorded: 2001
- Genres: Dancehall, Reggae
- Label: VP
- Producers: Sizzla (executive); Bobby Digital; Joel Chin; Paul Shields

Sizzla chronology
Up in Fire (2002)	Da Real Thing (2002)	Rise to the Occasion (2003)

Da Real Thing is reggae, dancehall artist Sizzla's seventeenth studio album. It was released on November 19, 2002. The album is a mix of dancehall and reggae, with the singles "Solid as a Rock", "Thank U Mamma" and "Just One of Those Days (Dry Cry)".

== Track listing ==
1. "Mash Dem Down"
2. "Simplicity"
3. "Solid as a Rock"
4. "Rejoice"
5. "Thank U Mamma"
6. "Woman I Need You"
7. "Bless Up"
8. "Why Should I?"
9. "Got It Right Here"
10. "Just One of Those Days"
11. "Trod Mt. Zion"
12. "Its Amazing"
13. "She's Loving"
14. "Boom & Go Through"
15. "Touch Me" (featuring Rochelle)

The Album is Sizzla's most successful commercial album to date, and was ranked No. 32 on Complex Magazine's 100 Best "Albums Of The Complex Decade" list in 2012
