= Bobby Digital (Jamaican producer) =

Jamaican record producer (1961–2020)

Bobby "Bobby Digital" Dixon OD
- Also known as: Bobby Digital; Bobby "Digital" Dixon
- Born: Robert Dixon; 11 March 1961; Kingston, Jamaica
- Died: 22 May 2020 (aged 59) Kingston, Jamaica
- Genres: Reggae, dancehall
- Occupation: Record producer

Bobby Grantley Dixon (11 March 1961 – 22 May 2020), known as Bobby Digital, was a Jamaican reggae and dancehall producer. He was given his nickname "Bobby Digital" because King Jammy, with whom he worked in the mid-1980s, had begun experimenting with digital rhythms at around the same time. He owned the Digital B label, and among the artists with hits on the label are Shabba Ranks and Sizzla. He has influenced reggae artists such as Admiral Tibet.

== Biography ==
Dixon was born on 11 March 1961, the third of five children in the Waterhouse district of Kingston. He grew up attending dances in the 1970s, which featured sound systems such as Socialist Roots and Tippertone.

Dixon began working with King Jammy in Kingston in 1985. He struck out on his own in 1988, opening the Heatwave studio and forming the Digital B label, and thereafter a successful distribution company. In the 1980s, Dixon helped stylize the computerized phase of Jamaican music, as an accomplished digital engineer.

In the late 1980s and early 1990s, he was the producer for works by Shabba Ranks, Cocoa Tea, Ninjaman and Garnett Silk. He explored styles such as dancehall, lovers rock and roots reggae. He also formed his own sound system Heatwave.

In the late 1990s, he began to work with artists such as Morgan Heritage, Sizzla, Anthony B and Richie Spice. He was the producer of Sizzla's Black Woman and Child album of the late 1990s. Morgan Heritage's Protect Us, Jah also released in the late 1990s was another known collaboration, as well as their three-volume Morgan Heritage Family and Friends. Also recorded to Panamanian singer Reggae Sam various singles and dubplates for VP Records.

Dixon produced more albums for Richie Spice, Anthony B, Morgan Heritage, Chezidek, Ras Shiloh, Louie Culture, LMS, Mikey Spice, and Norris Man.

Dixon died in Kingston on 21 May 2020, at the age of 59 following a kidney-related illness.
