= Chezidek =

Jamaican roots reggae singer (born 1973)

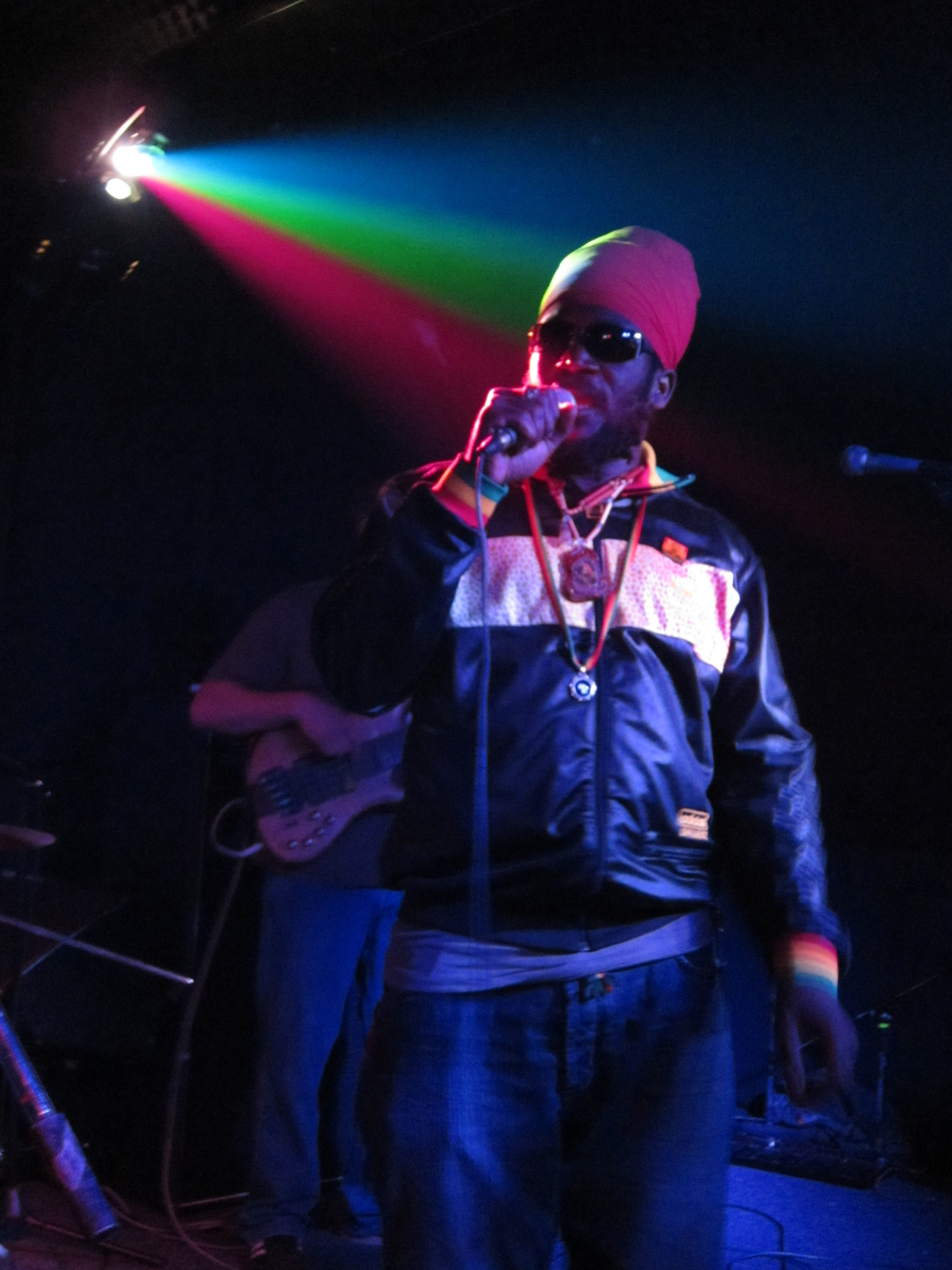
- Chezidek performing in 2010

Background information
- Also known as: Chezidek, Mel-Chezidek, Chilla Rinch
- Born: Desbert Johnson; 1973 (age 52–53); Saint Ann Parish, Jamaica
- Genres: Roots reggae
- Occupation: Singer
- Years active: 2000–present
- Labels: Cousins, Greensleeves Records, Massive B, Our Promotion, VP Records
- Website: chezidekreggae.com

Chezidek (born Desbert Johnson; 1973) is a Jamaican roots reggae singer. He is known for his hit singles, "Call Pon Dem" (featured in Grand Theft Auto IV), "Can't Hear Must Feel", "Inna Di Road", and "Leave De Trees".

== Biography ==
Chezidek started singing from an early age at school concerts, and was a member of St. Ann's Bay Marching Band. After finishing school he performed on sound systems in the area, as Chilla Rinch, singing and DJing at various dance and talent shows.

He left St. Ann's Bay for Kingston where he linked up with record producer Philip "Fatis" Burrell from Xterminator Production. He recorded his first album in 2002, entitled Harvest Time (distributed by VP Records), with popular tracks such as "Can't Hear Must Feel", "Breakfree" and the title track "Harvest Time".

His first number one hit single "Leave De Trees" on the Our Promotion label, produced by Hugh Miller (aka Bunny Dan) went on BBC Top 10 dancehall chart. Since then he has performed on major events such as Magnum Sting, Teen Splash, Dancehall Jam Jam, Bob Marley Tribute, and Tribute to Peter Tosh, Rebel Salute and Western Consciousness. He was awarded best new artiste by the Jamaica Federation of Music and Affiliated Artiste (JFM) for Middlesex (County).

Chezidek's album Inna Di Road was produced by Bobby "Massive B" Konders and distributed by Greensleeves Records in September 2007. "Call Pon Dem" as well as covers of "Mi Nah Run" from his album Inna Di Road is featured on the fictional radio station Massive B Sound system in Grand Theft Auto IV.

== Discography ==
Harvest Time (album)

- Released: 16 July 2002
- Format: CD _{(Catalog VP2188.2)}, LP _{(Catalog VP2188.1)}
- Label: VP Records
- Producer: Phillip "Fattis" Burell
- Tracks: Eleven
- Singles: "Breakfree", "Can't Hear Must Feel", "Harvest Time"

Rising Sun (album)

- Released: 29 March 2005
- Format: CD _{(Catalog VP2259.2)}, LP _{(Catalog VP2259.1)}
- Label: VP Records
- Producer: Phillip "Fattis" Burell
- Tracks: Fourteen
- Singles: "Inna Love"

Mash Dem Down (album)

- Released: 18 August 2006
- Format: CD _{(Catalog ALTA002.2)}, 2-LP Set _{(Catalog ALTA002.1)}
- Label: Al.Ta.Fa.An
- Producer: Soljie Hamilton
- Tracks: Fourteen
- Singles: "Mash Dem Down"

Firm Up Yourself (album)

- Released: 5 June 2007
- Format: CD _{(Catalog COUD0006.2)}, LP _{(Catalog COUD0006.1)}
- Label: Cousins Records
- Tracks: Fourteen

Inna Di Road (album)

- Released: 11 September 2007
- Format: CD _{(Catalog GREL300.2)}, LP _{(Catalog GREL300.1)}
- Label: Greensleeves Records
- Producer: Bobby "Massive B" Konders
- Tracks: Fourteen
- Bonus tracks: Two (Music Videos – "Inna Di Road", "Call Pon Dem") on (enhanced) CD
- Singles: "Call Pon Dem", "Inna Di Road", "Leave The Trees", "Mi Nah Run"

Judgement Time (album)

- Released: 4 June 2010
- Label: Heartbeat Europ (SunnyMoon)
- Tracks: Seventeen

=== Charted songs ===
List of charted songs, showing year released, chart positions and album name
Title	Year	Peak chart position	Album
Title	Year	JAM Air.	Album
"Let's Stay Together"	2021	9	Reggae Virus: First Dose
