= Ghost (singer) =

Jamaican reggae singer

- Born: Carlton Hylton; 1974 (age 50–51); Kingston, Jamaica
- Genres: Reggae, dancehall, ragga, lovers rock
- Occupation: Singer-songwriter
- Instrument: Vocals
- Years active: 1993–present
- Labels: VP; Music Ambassador; Monster Shack Music

Carlton Hylton (born 1974), better known as Ghost, is a Jamaican singjay performer. He is best known for songs such as the dancehall hit "Body Guard". He gained his first notice in 1993 singing for Clifton "Specialist" Dillon on ragga songs, partnering with DJ Culture as rapper. Ghost was a member of Monster Shack Crew in 1996. He joined Jamaican singer Tony Curtis on 1997's "Wine", produced by Classical People for Opera House Production. He has 4 Children, 3 daughters, S. , Jinelle, Lamoya, and 1 son, Carlton Jr. by his wife Carol Hylton. In 1998 he wrote "What Have You Done" with Anthony Cameron, released as a single produced by Red Rose & Malvo during sessions for their compilation album How You Fi Sey Dat?

Hylton picked up the nickname "Ghost" as a child in Kingston, Jamaica, from the reaction of other children to his appearance in head bandages after being hit by a bicycle in the road.

In 2020, Ghost released the Christian worship song "Humbly Before Thee" under the Ghetto Youths International label.

== Discography ==
- 1994 – Slowly
- 2000 – Love You
- 2002 – Under the Moonlight
- 2007 – The Get Down
- 2007 – Not the American Idol!
- 2010 – No Limit
- 2011 – Stories
