= Hyacinth Bennett =

Jamaican educator and politician

Hyacinth Delores Bennett

Senator
- In office 1
- In office 2007–2011

Personal details
- Citizenship: Jamaica
- Other political affiliations: Jamaica Labour Party
- Education: University of the West Indies
- Occupation: President of Hydel

Hyacinth Delores Bennett (born 1946) is a Jamaican educator and politician who is the founder and former president of Hydel High School, as well as the first female head of a political party in Jamaica, when she succeeded Bruce Golding in 2001 to become president of the National Democratic Movement (NDM) party.

Bennett also established Hydel University as well as Hydel Prep School and is a former chairperson of the Caribbean Maritime University until 2020.

A former principal of Wolmers Prep School, Bennett began her teaching career in 1968 after graduating from Bethlehem Teachers College, in the Parish of St. Elizabeth, Jamaica.
