= Greensleeves Rhythm Album 86: Ghetto Whiskey =

Greensleeves Rhythm Album #86: Ghetto Whiskey

Compilation album by Various artists
- Released: 2006
- Recorded: 2006
- Genre: Dancehall
- Label: Greensleeves
- Producer: Delroy "Delly Ranx" Foster

Various artists chronology
Inspector (2006)	Greensleeves Rhythm Album #86: Ghetto Whiskey (2006)	Airwaves (2008)

Greensleeves Rhythm Album #86: Ghetto Whiskey is an album in Greensleeves Records' rhythm album series. It was released in November 2006 on CD and LP. The album features various artists recorded over the "Ghetto Whiskey" riddim produced/created by Delly Ranx.

== Track listing ==
1. "Move Your Body" - Sean Paul
2. "Ghetto Whiskey" - Delly Ranx & Chino
3. "Gunrise" - Mavado & Vybz Kartel
4. "Bung Bong" - Boysie & Not Nice
5. "All Day" - Craig Dennis
6. "Freeze" - T.O.K.
7. "Gangsta" - Delly Ranx
8. "Bruck It" - Vybz Kartel
9. "Formula" - Chino
10. "We Don't Take Bad Up" - Elephant Man
11. "How Will I Know" - Singing Sweet
12. "Wine Pon This" - Soltex 3000
13. "Mek It Beat" - Sizzla
14. "Highgrade Everyday" - Nitty Kutchie & Roundhead
15. "Mistake" - Wayne Wonder
16. "Rise The Machine" - Anthony B
17. "Who We Are" - Wayne Marshall
18. "Bere Sitten Sitten" - Tyrical
19. "Convince Me" - Shema
20. "Bad Mind" - Bramma
21. "Someone" - Mr. Easy
22. "For The Girl Dem" - Chukki Starr
23. "Protect Your Soul" - Norris Man
24. "I Will" - Turbulence
25. "Long Time" - Khari Jess
26. "War Monga" - Aidonia
27. "I'm Dangerous" - Mega Banton
28. "Ghetto Whiskey Rhythm" - Di Ranx & The Genious
