= Blaze Up the Chalwa =

Studio album by Sizzla
- Released: January 22, 2002
- Recorded: 2001
- Genres: Reggae, dancehall
- Label: Jet Star (U. K.)
- Producers: Colin Levy (executive); Cecile Charlton; Colin Levy; Cordel "Skatta" Burrell; Dillon Reid; Devon Weatley; Donald "Tixie" Dixon; G. Hamilton; Marlon Cooke; T. McClean

Sizzla chronology
Black History (2001)	Blaze Up the Chalwa (2002)	Ghetto Revolution (2002)

Blaze Up the Chalwa is Jamaican reggae artist Sizzla's 14th studio album, released on Charm Records on January 22, 2002.

== Track listing ==
#	Title	Producer(s)	Composer(s)	Featured Performer(s)	Time
1	"What's Up"	Donald "Tixie" Dixon	Collins, M./Dixon, D.		3:57
2	"It's All Yours"	T. McClean, G. Hamilton*	Collins, M/McClean, T/Hamilton, G.		3:28
3	"Mama Africa"	Cordel "Skatta" Burrell	Burrell, C./Collins, M.		3:33
4	"Gunshot"	Cecile Charlton, Cordel "Skatta" Burrell*	Collins, M/Charlton, C/Burrell, C		3:17
5	"Dat Dem Love"	Marlon Cooke	Collins, M/Cooke, M		2:34
6	"Give It To Dem"	Cecile Charlton, Cordel "Skatta" Burrell*	Collins, M/Charlton, C/Burrell, C		3:46
7	"Show Us The Way"	Colin Levy	Collins, M/Levy, C		3:28
8	"Do What Jah Say"	Devon Weatley, Cordel "Skatta" Burrell*	Weatley, D/Burrell, C/Collins, M		2:28
9	"Standing Ovation"	Cordel "Skatta" Burrell	Burrell, C/Collins, M		3:42
10	"Scream And Shout"	Cordel "Skatta" Burrell	Burrell, C/Collins, M		3:22
11	"Juvenile"	Colin Levy	Collins, M/Levy, C		3:26
12	"Legendary"	Donald "Tixie" Dixon	Dixon, D/Collins, M		3:49
13	"Trample"	Marlon Cooke	Cooke, M/Collins, M		2:30
14	"Trod On"	Colin Levy	Levy, C/Collins, M		4:05
15	"Fear No Foe"	Dillon Reid	Collins, M		3:06
16	"Karate"	Cordel "Skatta" Burrell	Collins, M		3:01
17	"Present"	Dillon Reid	Collins, M/Reid, D		3:02
