= Hydel High School =

Coordinates: 18.0248°N 76.8753°W

Location
- Mandela Highway; Jamaica; Ferry, Saint Catherine; Jamaica

Information
- School type: Private Co-educational Secondary
- Motto: Soaring On The Wings Of Excellence
- Established: September 5, 1993
- Founder: Hyacinth Delores Bennett
- Principal: Dr. Walton Small
- Campus type: Urban
- Website: www.hydelhigh.com

Hydel High School is a private co-educational secondary school, on the Ferry Highway in the Parish of St. Catherine, Jamaica. Founded by former Jamaican Senator, Hyacinth Bennett in September 1993, on Ardenne Road in Kingston, the school grew rapidly after relocating to its present Ferry Campus in September 1995. The Ferry campus was the former location of the now defunct amusement complex- Coney Park.

In 2022, the school recruited a new principal, who planned to refocus the school on academic achievement as well as sport, and to start accepting pupils through state funding. The new principal, Walton Small, spoke in 2023 of the school's "desperate needs".

== 2021 fire ==
In July 2021, a fire in the school's administrative building caused an estimated $50 million in damage.

== Notable alumni ==
- Zumjay, dancehall artist
- Alana Reid, sprinter
- Lisa Mercedez, dancehall artist
- Kerrica Hill, sprinter
- Lamara Distin, high jumper athlete
- Keithy Simpson, Professional Football Player
- Brianna Lyston, Sprinter
- Ashanti Moore, Sprinter
