= Rastafari Teach I Everything =

Studio album by Sizzla
- Released: September 4, 2001
- Genre: Reggae; Dancehall
- Label: Greensleeves
- Producer: Philip "Fatis" Burrell

Sizzla chronology
Taking Over (2001)	Rastafari Teach I Everything (2001)	Black History (2001)

Rastafari Teach I Everything is Jamaican reggae artist Sizzla's 12th studio album, released on Greensleeves on September 4, 2001.

== Track listing ==
1. "Rastafari Teach I Everything" (Burrell, Collins, Crosdale, Dunbar) – 4:44
2. "Beautiful" (Burrell, Collins, Donald Dennis, Dunbar, Smith) – 4:02
3. "Yes I Get High" (Burrell, Collins, Dennis) – 3:26
4. "Better Make Sure" (Burrell, Collins, Malachi, Meredith) – 4:08
5. "Revenge" (Burrell, Collins, Dennis) – 3:53
6. "Planet Earth" (Burrell, Collins, Edmund) – 4:18
7. "Escape from Prison" (Burrell, Collins, Dennis) – 3:51
8. "Give Her the Loving" (Burrell, Collins, Dennis) – 4:43
9. "It This" (Burrell, Collins, Dennis) – 3:32
10. "No Problem" (Burrell, Collins, Dennis) – 3:59
11. "Stay Clean" (Burrell, Collins, Dennis) – 3:17
12. "Energy" (Burrell, Collins, Dennis, Dunbar) – 3:48
13. "Make Love" (Burrell, Collins, Edmund, Valentine) – 4:17

== Credits ==
- Philip "Fatis" Burrell – producer
- Paul Crosdale – organ, piano
- Paul Daley – engineer
- Donald Dennis – bass, instrumentation
- Paul "Teetimus" Edmund – bass, drums, keyboards, instrumentation
- Mark Harrison – engineer
- Garfield McDonald – engineer, mixing
- Chris Meredith – bass, keyboards
- Robert Murphy – engineer, mixing
- Delroy "Fatta" Pottinger – engineer
- Earl "Chinna" Smith – guitar
- Nigel Staff – keyboards
- Stephen Stanley – keyboards, mixing
- Rudy Valentine – guitar, assistant engineer, mixing assistant
- Collin "Bulbie" York – engineer
