= Voice Mail (band) =

Dancehall reggae trio

Voicemail
- Origin: Kingston, Jamaica
- Genres: Dancehall, reggae, reggae fusion
- Years active: 2003–present
- Label: VP Records
- Members: Jerome Jackson (Qraig); Kevin Blair (Kevyn V)
- Past members: O'Neil Edwards (deceased)

Voicemail is a dancehall reggae fusion duo from Kingston, Jamaica.

== Group members ==
Jerome Jackson (Qraig), Kevin Blair (Kevyn V), O'Neil Edwards (deceased)

== History ==
The five founding members met at a talent show in 1999, where they decided to form the boy band "Voicemail". The group then consisted of Robert Manning, Leonardo Grant (lead singer), Kevin Blair, Jerome Jackson and O’Neil Edwards. In 2002, both Robert and Leonardo decided to leave the group.

The now-reduced group continued under the name Voicemail and did their first recording as a trio in 2003, a single called "Never Really Want to Let You Go" with radio disc jockey and producer Arif Cooper.

Since then, the group has recorded with producers such as Tony Kelly, Robert Livingston and Danny Champagne. In 2004, they got their first local hit in "Weddy Time", featuring Delly Ranks and Jamaican dancer Bogle and produced by Danny Champagne. Following this success, they went on to record a collection of singles and accompanying videos such as "She Want It Harder", "Weddy Time", "Ready To Party", and "Wacky Dip".

The group began performing at various local events, featuring at Spring Fest 2004, Fully Loaded, and Reggae Sumfest in 2004 and 2005. Voicemail became known for their ever-evolving dance routines, permissive lyrics, and keen fashion sense.

On 18 July 2006, the group released their first album "Hey" with VP Records, which was an international success. In 2007 they released their second album entitled "Let's Go," followed by "Jump Off" in 2008. Both albums were distributed by Japan's Pony Canyon Label. "Jump Off" went in a different direction as this contained no dance songs, for which the group had become synonymous. The group went on to headline several major shows in Japan, including the largest reggae festival "Yokohama Reggae SAI". The group went on to perform extensively in the Caribbean, amassing a large following in the United States and Europe.

In the morning of 9 May 2010, O'Neil Edwards was shot at his home in Duhaney Park. Despite undergoing emergency surgery, O’Neil died two weeks later on 26 May. The same year, the now duo left for Europe on a tour that would be called "Tribute to O’Neil". In 2012, as a homage to O’Neil, the duo released a free album on YouTube with Captivate Music titled "Next Level", which featured their last recordings with O’Neil.

The duo released a dance album entitled "Let’s Dance" in 2013 and toured Japan once again in 2014. In 2015, the Duo released their second project, an EP titled "Gamechangers" and produced by Dancehallrulerz. The same year, they toured the United States, the Caribbean and Europe.

In 2016 and 2017, the group released singles "Weh deh pon yuh foot", "I Wanna Dance", "Waist a Move", "Dancehall" and "My Team".

== Discography ==
=== Albums ===
Date of Release	Title	Label	Reviews	Catalog Number
Albums
18 July 2006	Hey	VP Records/Universal	Allmusic link	1728
16 July 2008	Jump Off	VP Records		
