= Foxy Brown (singer) =

Jamaican reggae singer

- Born: Jennifer Esmerelda Hylton; July 14, 1968 (age 57)
- Origin: Jamaica
- Genres: Reggae, lovers rock
- Occupation: Singer
- Years active: Early 1980s–present
- Labels: RAS, VP

Jennifer Esmerelda Hylton (born July 14, 1968) known professionally as Foxy Brown, is a Jamaican reggae singer. Her first introduction to the reggae charts was via the Steely & Clevie-produced versions of Tracy Chapman's "(Sorry) Baby, Can I Hold You Tonight" and "Fast Car," the former even entering Billboard's Black Singles Chart. These led to her being regarded as Jamaica's Tracy Chapman. She released her debut album Foxy, in 1989, which showcased her original songwriting. In 1990 she had a hit with the dancehall single "Always For Me", and a second album, My Kind of Girl, followed in the same year. She also had a hit with Johnny P called "If you Love Me". In her later years, she struggled with mental-health issues.

== Discography ==
- Foxy (1989), RAS/Sanctuary/BMG
- My Kind of Girl (1990), RAS/Sanctuary/BMG
- Whip Appeal (1992), VP
