= Ghetto Revolutionary =

Studio album by Sizzla
- Released: September 24, 2002 (U.S.)
- Recorded: 2001
- Genre: Dancehall, reggae
- Length: 65:17
- Label: Greensleeves Records
- Producer: Philip Burrell (executive); Donald Dennis; Miguel Collins; Courtney McLaughlin

Sizzla chronology
Blaze Up the Chalwa (2002)	Ghetto Revolutionary (2002)	Up In Fire (2002)

Professional ratings
Review scores
Source	Rating
AllMusic	4/5 stars
The Encyclopedia of Popular Music	3/5 stars
Uncut	2/5 stars

Ghetto Revolutionary is a studio album by the reggae and dancehall artist Sizzla. It was released on September 24, 2002. The album is a mix of dancehall and reggae. The album's hit single "Ghetto Revolution," is about the trials and tribulations that people have to go through in the ghetto of Kingston, Jamaica.

The album peaked at #6 on the Billboard Reggae Albums chart.

== Critical reception ==
AllMusic wrote that the "mix of themes and attitudes offers a nice break from the unrelenting 'fire bun' rhetoric that has been Sizzla's stock-in-trade in the past, and makes this album a good introduction for those unfamiliar with this important artist."

== Track listing ==
1. "Ghetto Revolution"
2. "Jah Will Be There"
3. "That's Why"
4. "The Truth Is Revealing"
5. "Don't Say"
6. "Just Fine"
7. "Don't Waste Time"
8. "I Want You"
9. "Love The Little Children"
10. "Have You"
11. "Live It Up"
12. "Won't Stop"
13. "So Serious"
