= Jigsy King =

Jamaican dancehall artist (born 1970)

- Born: Errol King c.1970
- Origin: Kingston, Jamaica
- Genres: Dancehall
- Occupation: Deejay
- Years active: Early 1990s-present
- Labels: VP

Errol "Jigsy" King (born c.1970) is a Jamaican dancehall artist who released several albums on VP Records in the 1990s.

== Biography ==
King emerged in the early 1990s, performing on sound systems, with a gruff vocal style similar to Buju Banton's. After several hit singles in Jamaica, he had some international success with "Work", a combination single with Barrington Levy. He topped the Jamaican singles chart in 1996 with "Sweet Sensimella", a duet with British singer Jamie Irie. His other hits include "Butterfly", "Rail Up", "Haffi Get You Body", "Gal A Fuss Gal A Fight", "Real Ting" (with Tony Curtis), and "Question Ask" (with Freddie McGregor).

In 2007 he was found guilty of disorderly conduct after verbally attacking the Queen of the United Kingdom and the Jamaican police on stage during his performance at Curefest in Trelawny.

== Discography ==
- Load It Back (1993), VP
- Have to Get You (1993), VP
- Ashes to Ashes (1995), VP
