= Soul Deep (Sizzla album) =

Studio album by Sizzla
- Released: July 12, 2005 (U.S.)
- Genre: Dancehall reggae
- Label: Greensleeves Records/VP
- Producer: Donovan Bennett (executive); M.Collins

Sizzla chronology
Red Alert (2005)	Soul Deep (2005)

Soul Deep is the 26th studio album from reggae and dancehall artist Sizzla. The album was released on July 12, 2005. The album includes the single "Be Strong". The album has only one appearance from Reggae singing group Morgan Heritage. The album also has production from M. Collins and Donovan "Vendetta" Bennett.

== Track listing ==
1. "Good Morning"
2. "Where are You Running To"
3. "Girls Come to See Me"
4. "All I Want" (featuring Morgan Heritage)
5. "Nothing Bothers Me"
6. "Mount Zion"
7. "Good to Know"
8. "Love You More"
9. "Show Me"
10. "Be Strong"
11. "Why"
12. "Love Me"
13. "Push & Shove"
