= Black Woman & Child =

Studio album by Sizzla
- Released: September 16, 1997
- Genre: Reggae
- Length: 56:56
- Label: VP
- Producer: Robert Dixon

Sizzla chronology
Burning Up (1995)	Black Woman & Child (1997)	Praise Ye Jah (1997)

Professional ratings
Review scores
Source	Rating
AllMusic	4/5 stars

Black Woman & Child is the second studio album by Jamaican reggae artist Sizzla. It was released on September 16, 1997 on VP Records and produced by Robert "Bobby Digital" Dixon.

The album was listed in the 1999 book The Rough Guide: Reggae: 100 Essential CDs.

== Track listing ==
1. "Give Them the Ride" – 3:27
2. "Love Is Divine" – 3:47
3. "Make It Secure" – 3:38
4. "Blackwoman & Child" – 3:50
5. "Guide Over Us" – 3:38
6. "Hard Ground" – 3:38
7. "One Away" – 3:58
8. "Oh What a Joy" – 3:58
9. "Babylon a Use Dem Brain" (featuring Capleton) – 3:54
10. "Princess Black" – 4:36
11. "No Time to Gaze" – 3:43
12. "More Guidance" – 3:47
13. "Mi Lord" (featuring Spectacular) – 3:53
14. "Give Them the Ride Remix" – 3:36
15. "Too Much to Bare" – 3:33

2002 re-release bonus tracks

1. "Do Good Everytime" – 3:37
2. "Nice Day" – 3:45
