= Love Is All... =

Song by the Danish dance-pop duo Infernal

Single by Infernal

from the album Fall from Grace
- Released: 10 May 2010
- Genre: Dance-pop
- Length: 3:30
- Label: Border Breakers
- Songwriter(s): Paw Lagermann, Lina Rafn, Adam Powers
- Producer(s): Paw Lagermann, Lina Rafn

Infernal singles chronology
| "Redefinition" (2009) | "Love Is All..." (2010) | "Alone, Together" (2010) |

"Love Is All..." is a song by the Danish dance-pop duo Infernal. It was announced to be the lead single off their forthcoming fifth studio album, Fall from Grace, on 4 April 2010 in a blog post by Paw Lagermann in Infernal's website. The song was released as a digital download on 10 May 2010 and debuted at #6 on the Danish Singles Chart on 22 May 2010. It has since been certified gold by the International Federation of the Phonographic Industry (IFPI) for sales of 15,000 units. On 27 April 2012, Infernal released a new version of "Love Is All..." for the international market.

The music video was directed by Jakob Øllgaard and produced by Klaus Christensen for M2FILM.

== Track listing ==
Digital download
| No. | Title | Length |
|---|---|---|
| 1. | "Love Is All..." (original version) | 3:30 |
| 2. | "Love Is All..." (extended version) | 6:44 |

Digital download – 2012 version
| No. | Title | Length |
|---|---|---|
| 1. | "Love Is All..." (radio version) | 3:14 |
| 2. | "Love Is All..." (extended version) | 5:07 |

== Charts and certifications ==
=== Charts ===
| Chart (2010) | Peak position |
|---|---|
| Denmark (Tracklisten) | 6 |

=== Certifications ===
| Country | Certification |
|---|---|
| Denmark | Gold |

== Release history ==
| Region | Date | Format |
|---|---|---|
| Worldwide | 3 May 2010 | Radio |
| Worldwide | 10 May 2010 | Digital download |
| United Kingdom | 27 April 2012 | Digital download |
