= Freedom Cry =

Studio album by Sizzla
- Released: November 11, 1998
- Genre: Reggae, Dancehall
- Label: VP Records

Sizzla chronology
Black Woman & Child (1997)	Freedom Cry (1998)	Good Ways (1999)

Professional ratings
Review scores
Source	Rating
Allmusic	link

Freedom Cry is reggae artist Sizzla's fourth studio album, released November 11, 1998 on VP Records as Freedom Cry in the United States and as Kalonji in Europe. It features mainly conscious reggae songs, all written by Sizzla himself.

== Track listing ==
1. Real – 3:49
2. Jah Blessing featuring Luciano – 3:48
3. Dem Ah Try Ah Ting – 3:52
4. Lovely Morning – 3:44
5. She's Like the Roses – 3:08
6. Saturated – 3:54
7. Love Amongst My Brethren – 3:59
8. Made Of – 3:53
9. Freedom Cry – 4:02
10. Long Journey – 4:10
11. Till It Some More – 3:48
12. Rain Shower – 3:45
13. Ancient Memories – 3:38
