= Rise to the Occasion (album) =

Studio album by Sizzla
- Released: September 30, 2003 (U.S.)
- Genre: Dancehall, Reggae
- Length: 77:17
- Label: Greensleeves Records/VP
- Producer: Donovan Bennett (executive); Miguel Collins; Baby G DJ Wayne; Daniel Lewis

Sizzla chronology
Da Real Thing (2002)	Rise to the Occasion (2003)	Light of My World (2003)

Rise to the Occasion is reggae, dancehall artist Sizzla's eighteenth studio album. The album was released on September 30, 2003. The album is a mix of dancehall and reggae, with singles such as "Rise to the Occasion" and "Give Me a Try".

== Track listing ==
1. "Rise to the Occasion" – 3:53
2. "All Is Well" – 3:34
3. "Give Me a Try" – 3:40
4. "Give Praises" – 3:19
5. "The One" – 3:30
6. "Don't Trouble Us" – 3:27
7. "I Was Born" – 2:38
8. "It's Burning" – 3:29
9. "Nice & Lovely" – 3:55
10. "Know Yourself" – 3:40
11. "In the Mood" – 3:37
12. "Come On" – 3:26
13. "These Are the Days" – 3:31
14. "Fire Blaze" – 3:49
15. "Hype" – 3:41
16. "True Love" – 3:34
17. "All I Need" – 3:23
