= Thriller U =

- Born: Eustace C. Hamilton; 14 August 1969 (age 57); Kingston, Jamaica
- Genres: Reggae, lovers rock, dancehall
- Occupation: Singer-songwriter
- Instrument: Vocals
- Years active: 1986–present
- Labels: Jammy's; Germain; Penthouse; Polydor; VP; Pioneer Muzik; Mixing Lab; Overheat; Angella; World; Cutting Edge; Vena; Live and Love; Roux; Star Trills; Steely & Clevie
- Website: www.youtube.com/@thrillerutheworldsinger

Eustace C. Hamilton (born 14 August 1969), better known by his stage name Thriller U, is a Jamaican reggae and dancehall singer-songwriter. known for his solo work and as a member of the reggae group L.U.S.T., and has released notable lovers rock and reggae tracks like "Missing Your Love", "My Love", "I'll Prove It To You", "Waiting for You", and "I Am the Danger".

== Biography ==
Thriller U was born Eustace C. Hamilton in Kingston, Jamaica, 14 August 1969. While attending the Spanish Town Secondary School in St. Catherine Jamaica, his interest in music and songwriting started to develop.

== Discography ==
=== Albums ===
- Young Single and Fresh (1987), Vena Recordings
- Waiting for You (1989), Live and Love Records
- The Danger (1989), Jammy's Records
- On and On (1989), Mixing Lab
- Crazy (1989), Germain Records/Penthouse Records
- Hilary (1989), Pioneer Muzik
- Drive (1992), Steely & Clevie Records/Overheat Records
- Best of Me (1993), World Records
- Love Rule (1995), VP Records
- All About You (1995), Overheat Records
- No Surrender (1996), Cutting Edge
- Drive +3 Dubs (1997), Polydor Records
- Wana B Free (1998), Cutting Edge
- Youth (1999), Cutting Edge
- Silky Smooth (2003), Angella Records

=== Split albums ===
- Too Good to be True (with Admiral Tibet) (1989), Digital-B
- Johnny Osbourne Vs Thriller U (with Johnny Osbourne) (1992), Alpha Enterprise
- Thriller U & Sanchez (with Sanchez) (1996), Record Factory

=== Compilations albums ===
- My Love (1994), Alpha Enterprise/Hybrid
- Let's Stay Together (1997), Roux
- The Very Best (2000), Super Power Records
- Endless Vacation: The Best of Thriller U (2000), Cutting Edge
