= Admiral Tibet =

Jamaican dancehall singer

- Also known as: Mr. Reality
- Born: Kenneth Allen; 1960 (age 65–66); St. Mary, Jamaica
- Genres: Conscious reggae, dancehall, ragga, digital roots reggae
- Years active: Late 1970s – present

Admiral Tibet (sometimes Tibett), also known as "Mr. Reality" (born Kenneth Allen, Freehill, Saint Mary, Jamaica, 1960), is a Jamaican dancehall singer known for his "cultural" lyrics. His stance of lyrics was made in the song "Reality Time" from the album of the same name, which included the lyrics "Reality time, culture time, we want no slackness".

== Biography ==
Tibet was one of the few artists from the early days of digital reggae to focus on "conscious" themes in his lyrics. A member of the Twelve Tribes of Israel since his youth. He has been described as "the most consistently conscious singer of his age". Allen described how he got his nickname: "I was going primary school and my cousin, both of us were sitting together looking into an atlas, and saw the name 'Tibet'. My cousin took it as a mockery and seh 'Tibet! Tibet!' and it stuck."

He began performing in Jamaican clubs and with sound systems during his teens, including his local Torpedo system. He made his first recordings when he was in his 20s; a reluctance to move to Kingston played a part in this. He eventually made the move in 1982. In 1985, Tibet made his first recording for producer Sherman Clacher, entitled "Babylon War", Shortly after this he began recording for Winston Riley where he recorded the song "Leave People Business"; Redman; King Jammy, where he had recorded songs such as "Chase Them Jah" in 1986 and other songs including his biggest hit song "Serious Time" in 1987; and Bobby Digital. His debut album Come into the Light was produced by King Jammy and released in 1987. He recorded several more albums in the late 1980s and early 1990s. He appeared at the Reggae Sunsplash festival in 1989. He was less prolific in the 1990s but returned with more albums in the 2000s, and was still performing in the late 2000s.

His hit "Serious Time" was later issued in remixed Discomix form with contributions from two-time Grammy winner Shabba Ranks and Ninjaman, signalling a reconciliation between the two deejays who had been bitter rivals for some time.

His voice has been described: "at its best has a convincing, vulnerable quality entirely suited to sufferers' laments."

== Discography ==
- Come into the Light (1987) Live & Love
- The Time is Going to Come (1988) Puppy
- War in Babylon (1988) RAS
- Two Good to be True (1990) Blue Mountain (with Thriller U)
- Reality Time (1991) Digital B/VP
- Separate Class (1991) Digital B/VP
- Excitement (1995) Musidisc
- Weeping & Mourning (1997) Melodie
- Time Is Going to Come (1999) Rhino
- Try To Reach The Top (2000) Brick Wall
- Things That You Do (2000) TP
- Fire Fire Burning (2002) Heartbeat (with Michael Rose)
- Determination (2003-01-03) Humal
- Time Alone Will Tell (2003) Artists Only
- Running from Reality (2006) Super Power
- Gone nowhere(2015) EarlyDays Records, France
