= Riddim Driven (series) =

Compilation album series

Riddim Driven is a series of various artists compilation albums released by VP Records. Each volume of the series features tracks from multiple artists recorded over one or two reggae or dancehall riddims produced by various producers. The series began in January 2001 with the release of the Chiney Gal & Blazing riddim album. Greensleeves Records has a similar series of compilation albums, known as Greensleeves Rhythm Album.

== Discography ==
=== 2001 ===
- Chiney Gal & Blazing
- Speed & Full Moon
- Thunder & Bedroom
- Trilogy
- Extasy
- Tun It Up
- Juice
- Pressure Cooker
- Slow Down The Pace
- Rice and Peas
- Candle Wax
- Trilogy Pt. 2 & Ole Sore
- Scare Crow
- Giddeon War
- Liquid
- Nine Night
- Mr Brown Meets Number One
- Engine 54 & Humanity
- Buy Out

=== 2002 ===
- Glue
- Just Friends
- The Flip
- Bondage
- X5
- Renegade
- Hi Fever
- Tabla
- White Liva
- Engine
- Blindfold
- Party Time
- The Beach
- Rematch
- Mexican
- G-String
- Diesel

=== 2003 ===
- The Wave
- Diggy Diggy
- Washout
- Tai Chi
- 44 Flat
- Hydro
- Throw Back
- Time Travel
- Sexy Lady Explosion
- Caribbean Style
- All Out
- Forensic
- Scream
- Wanted
- Good Times
- Salsa
- Adrenaline
- Earth, Wind & Flames
- Golden Bathtub
- Puppy Water
- Trafalga

=== 2004 ===
- Project X
- Fiesta
- Coolie Skank
- Celebration
- Hot Gal
- Flava
- Chrome
- Doctor's Darling
- Career
- Mad Instruments
- Check It Back
- Thrilla
- I Swear
- Sunlight
- Maybach
- Dancehall Rock
- Stepz
- Phantom
- Grindin
- Cookie Monster & Allo Allo
- Dreamweaver
- Hard Times
- Juicy
- Mamacita
- Tiajuana
- Tun It Up Ah Nadda Notch

=== 2005 ===
- Rah! Rah!
- Strip Down
- Lion Paw
- 1985 Sleng Teng Extravaganza
- Ruckus
- Bubble Up
- Kopa
- Sleepy Dog
- Bingie Trod
- Return to Big Street
- Cry Baby
- My Swing
- Bad Bargain
- First Prize
- Old Truck
- Lava Splash
- Ice Breaka
- Applause
- Move
- My Baby
- Throw Back Giggy
- Sleng Teng Resurrection

=== 2006 ===
- R.A.W. (Ready and Willing)
- Baddis Ting
- Reflections
- Capital P
- Nookie 2K6
- Wild 2 Nite
- Smash
- Global
- Red Bull & Guinness
- Higher Octane
- Dem Time Deh
- Wipe Out
- Gully Slime
- Full Draw
- Sidewalk University
- Consuming Fire
- 2 Bad Riddims 3 (Eighty-Five & Stage Show)

=== 2007 ===
- 12 Gauge
- Dreaming
- Power Cut
- Heathen
- Tremor
- Jam Down
- Guardian Angel
- Stop the Fighting

=== 2008 ===
- Shaddowz (Darker Shadow, Dark Again & Shadow)
- Rub-A-Dub
- To The World: Vol. 1
- Clean Sweep

=== 2009 ===
- Beauty & the Beast
- Rock Steady
- Sweet
- Clearance
- Trippple Bounce

=== 2010 ===
- Ghetto
- Street Team
- World Premiere
- Classic
