= Screwdriver (musician) =

Jamaican reggae artist

- Born: Dalton Lindo; 1960 (age 64–65); Saint James Parish, Jamaica
- Genres: Reggae, dancehall
- Occupation: Singer-songwriter
- Years active: mid-1980s–present

Screwdriver (born Dalton Lindo, 1960, Saint James Parish, Jamaica) is a reggae artist active since the mid-1980s.

== Biography ==
Born Dalton Lindo in Saint James Parish in 1960, in the mid-1980s, Lindo travelled to Kingston, where he met and was encouraged in his musical career by Beres Hammond. Taking inspiration from the likes of Tenor Saw, Pinchers, Pliers, and Spanner Banner, he began recording in 1986, having hits with "We Rule", "Soundboy Killa", "Family Counsellor", and "Here I Come". He had a Jamaican number one single in 1989 with "No Mama (Sharon Yuh Pregnant?)", which became a major hit throughout the Caribbean. His success led to tours of Canada and the United States, and he eventually settled in Florida in the early 1990s. Further hits followed with "Reggae on Broadway", "Teach Dem", and "HIV", and in the mid-1990s he began to blend hip hop and R&B with dancehall, notably on the Calling Calling album from 1995. 1996 saw the release of Screwdriver's self-produced Let Me Remind You album. Screwdriver made a guest appearance on John Holt's 1997 album All Night Long. Shortly after the release of Let Me Remind You, Screwdriver began working on his next album, Prophecy, which was released in 2001. He said of the album: "Mi try do a little a everything on it...some ska, some jazz, a little merengue. Is a musician album".

In 2007's Road Block mixes new rhythms with old ones and features a new version of his biggest hit, "No Mama", retitled "Sherron". Since "road Block" Screwdriver released 2 more albums, "Child Of The Universe" in 2009 for Jalpro Records, and "African Union" in 2013 on Upstairs Music label. Screwdriver wrote the song "Jah Send Him Come" in support of Barack Obama's presidential election campaign. He initially offered the song to Luciano, but when the offer was declined recorded it himself.

== Albums ==
- Teach Dem (1992) Imp
- Calling Calling (1995) Ikus
- Let Me Remind You (1996) (reissued (2002) Jet Star)
- Prophecy (2001) Artist Only!
- Road Block (2007) VP
- Child of the Universe (2009) Jalpro Records
- African Union (2013) Upstairs Music
