= Zumjay =

- Also known as: Zumjay
- Born: Rohan Stephens; April 6, 1975 (age 51); Kingston, Jamaica
- Origin: Kingston, Jamaica
- Genre: Dancehall
- Occupation: Deejay
- Label: Capcha Music

Rohan Stephens, better known as Zumjay, is a popular dancehall deejay. Besides his success in Jamaica, including performances at Jamaica's biggest reggae festivals Sunsplash and Sting, Zumjay has toured Europe in 2004 and 2005 (the second year with fellow deejay Alozade).

Stephens was born in Kingston, Jamaica, and was raised in the city's Waterhouse district. He attended Kingston College and Hydel High School. At Hydel High School, Zumjay was Head Boy and participated in numerous extra curricular activities, including, a play, which won Gold at the Jamaica Drama Festival.

After graduating Hydel High, he worked at Donovan Germain's Penthouse Studios as an apprentice engineer, and became a recording artist himself around 1998, having success in 2000 with "Courtney", a tribute to cricketer Courtney Walsh. He released other successful singles including "Shake it", "Sticky" and "Dancing Team".

He married Aviesha Palmer in 2006, and in 2007, emigrated to the United States to become a member of the US Army Reserves, while also studying for a Video Arts Technology degree at the Borough of Manhattan Community College; He graduated in 2014 from the Federal Law Enforcement Training Centre.
