= Ras Shiloh =

American reggae artist (born 1975)

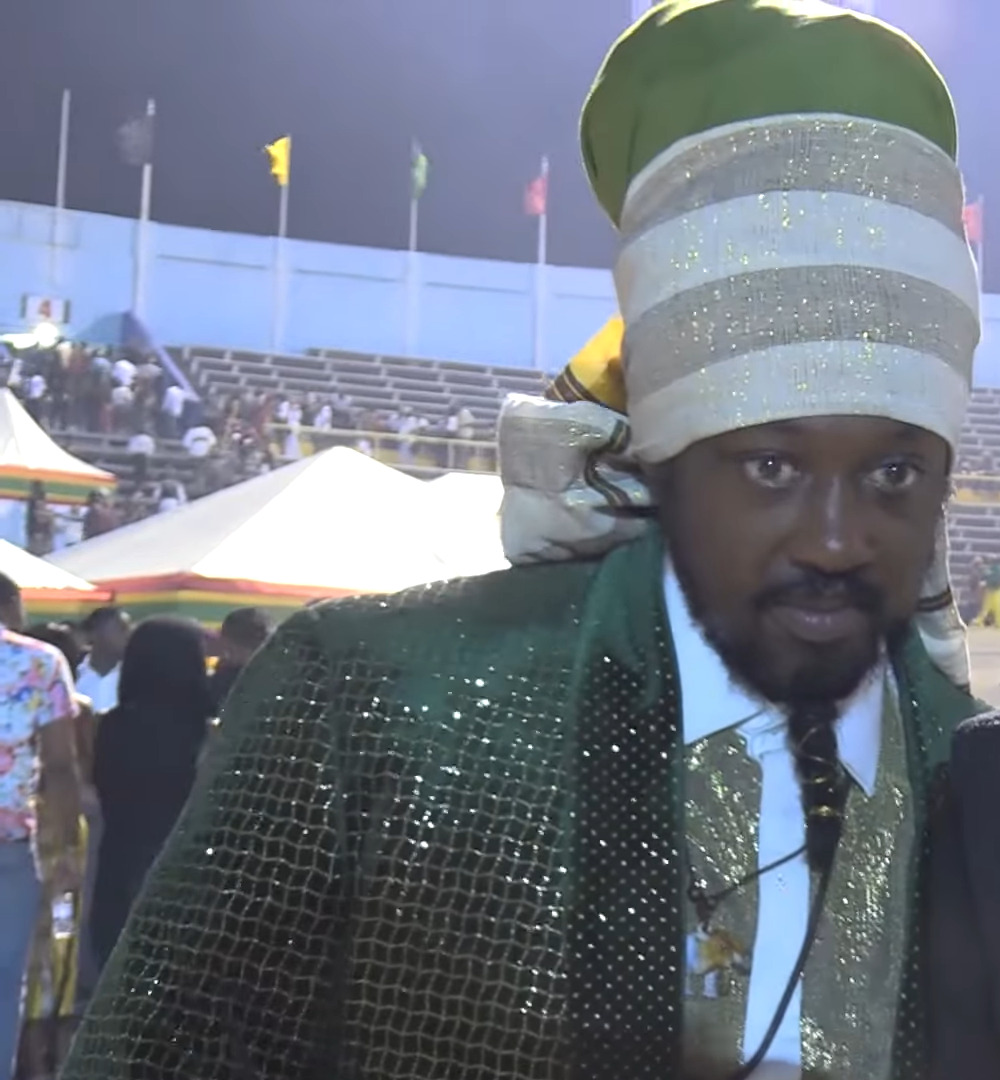
- Born: Thomas Williams; January 6, 1975 (age 51); Brooklyn, United States
- Occupation: reggae artist

Ras Shiloh (born Thomas Williams; January 6, 1975 in Brooklyn, United States) is an American reggae artist who made From Rasta to You in 2002 and Only King Selassie in 2007. His tenor vocals have been compared to the late Garnett Silk.

== Discography ==
- Chants (1997), Melchezidek - Ras Shiloh & Idrens
- Babylon You Doom (1998), Shiloh B
- Listen Well (1999), Who Dun It
- From Rasta To You (2002), VP
- Coming Home (2007), VP
- Only King Selassie (2007), Greensleeves
- Humanity EP (2012), Flava McGregor Records
