= Kiprich =

- Born: Marlon Jaro Plunkett; Linstead, St. Catherine, Jamaica
- Origin: Horizon Park, Kingston, Jamaica
- Genres: Dancehall
- Occupation: Deejay
- Years active: 1999–present
- Label: VP

Marlon Jaro Plunkett, better known as Kiprich, formerly known as Crazy Kid, is a popular Jamaican dancehall deejay. He, like his mentor Elephant Man, is a member of The Alliance, a group of Gangsta-themed deejays.

Plunkett was born in Linstead, St. Catherine, and raised in the Waterhouse district of Kingston. He attended Ardenne High School and was still a student when he had his first hit with "Leggo Di Bwoi", a collaboration with Chino; Later followed "Mad Sick Head No Good" together with fellow deejay Predator. Also, he wrote the lyrics for Elephant Man's "Jook Gal", whose remix together with Kiprich himself, Lil Jon and The East Side Boyz entered the charts in 2003 (see 2003 in music). His latest, and greatest hit so far was "Telephone Ting", followed by "The Letter".

He has become known for humorous songs and songs aimed at other deejays, such as "Talk", aimed at Elephant Man, Beenie Man, and Vybz Kartel, and "Ca'an Get Brown", aimed at Vybz Kartel.

In 2013 he released the album Kippo, which featured Keisha White on the track "My Heart Is a Jail".

== Discography ==
- Outta Road (2005)
- Drama King (2008)
- Kippo (2013)
