= Alozade =

- Born: Michael Neil Sterling
- Origin: Kingston, Jamaica
- Genres: Dancehall, reggae

Michael Neil Sterling, better known as Alozade, is a dancehall and reggae deejay notorious for his use of profanity. He has performed at the biggest Jamaican reggae festivals Sumfest and Sting as well as at the German Splash! festival in 2001.

He had his first success in 1999 with "Street Dreams", released on Byron Murray's in the Streets label. He had a major Jamaican hit in 2000 with "Bad Man Nuh Pet Gal".

He began working as a producer for his own South Block label, having hit singles in 2004 with Capleton ("Inna Her Heart") and Elephant Man ("Keeping it Jiggy").

In 2004, he toured Europe, performing in countries such as Italy, France, Hungary, Belgium, Norway and Switzerland.

In November 2012 he released the single "Justice", calling for an end to the rapes which he viewed as "plaguing Jamaica".
