= Philip "Fatis" Burrell =

- Born: 23 July 1954; Kingston, Jamaica
- Died: 3 December 2011 (aged 57); Kingston, Jamaica
- Genres: Reggae, dancehall
- Occupation: Record producer
- Years active: 1984–2011
- Labels: Kings & Lions; Vena; Exterminator/Xterminator

Philip "Fatis" Burrell (23 July 1954 – 3 December 2011) was a Jamaican record producer, who ran the Xterminator record label. He was one of the most successful producers of the digital reggae era.

== Biography ==
Born in Whitfield Town, Kingston, Burrell moved to Birmingham, England at the age of five before returning to Jamaica as a teenager. His first production was Sugar Minott's "More Dogs to the Bone" in 1984, starting the Kings & Lions record label in the same year. In 1986, he started the Vena label, releasing early works by new artists that he had discovered such as Sanchez, Pinchers and Thriller U, and established artists including Frankie Paul, Gregory Isaacs and Charlie Chaplin. By 1989, Burrell had founded the Exterminator (later Xterminator) label, which in the early 1990s released records by Ninjaman, Ini Kamoze, Admiral Tibet, Cocoa Tea, Beres Hammond and Johnny Osbourne.

More successes came with releases from Luciano, Sizzla (who he also managed), Everton Blender, Ras Shiloh and Turbulence. Burrell's house band included drummer Sly Dunbar and the Firehouse Crew.

Burrell died on 3 December 2011. He had been admitted to the University Hospital of the West Indies two weeks earlier after suffering a mild stroke, and a blood clot near his lungs caused his condition to worsen.

Burrell's son Kareem followed him into music production and released the Project X mixtape in 2012 to celebrate his father's birthday, and produced the Living Heart album later in the year, with contributions from Beres Hammond, Richie Spice, and Lutan Fyah.
