= VP Records =

US independent reggae record label

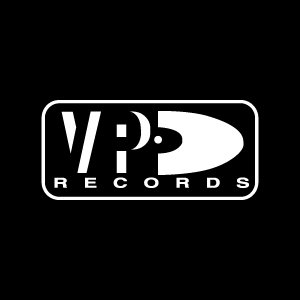
- Parent company: VP Music Group
- Founded: 1979
- Founder: Vincent "Randy" Chin; Patricia Chin a.k.a. Miss Pat
- Distributor: Alternative Distribution Alliance
- Genre: Reggae, dancehall, soca
- Country of origin: U.S.
- Location: Queens, New York
- Official website: www.vprecords.com

YouTube information
- Channel: VP Records
- Genre: Music
- Subscribers: 1.83 million
- Views: 1.6 billion
- Last updated: August 13, 2024

VP Records is an independent record label in Queens, New York specialized in Caribbean music. The label is known for releasing music by notable artists in reggae, dancehall and soca. VP Records has offices in New York City, Miami, London, Kingston, Tokyo, Johannesburg, Rio de Janeiro and Toronto. Additionally, the label has established a presence in Australia and New Zealand.

== History ==
The VP Records label was founded in 1979 by the late Vincent "Randy" Chin and his wife Patricia Chin, who owned the Randy's Records store in Kingston, Jamaica (as seen in the 1978 film Rockers), as well as the Studio 17 recording studios. In the mid-1970s, the Chins moved to New York City, setting up a record store in Brooklyn called VP Records in 1975, from which they sold and distributed records. In 1979, they relocated the store to Jamaica, Queens. In 1993, the record label was expanded after the success of the retail store. The name of the label is a product of the first letters in the founders' names.

The label established itself as one of the first and largest independent record labels for reggae and dancehall, and with the popularity of the riddim sound of the early 2000s, the label achieved worldwide success for artists such as Sean Paul through the label's deals with Warner Music Group's Atlantic Records and Virgin Music Canada. The label is often also accredited with having increased the popularity of the now globally recognized Elephant Man, also known as the 'Energy God' or 'Ele', through a deal with Bad Boy Records. VP Records acquired the slogan "Miles Ahead in Reggae Music" to signify that they could be considered to be the future of music that derives from the Caribbean. In addition to reggae, VP is also known for dancehall, soca, and reggaeton music. VP also releases a series of Riddim Driven albums, which feature various artists tracks using the same rhythm. The Biggest Reggae One-Drop Anthems is a series of CD reggae compilations that began in 2005 released by Greensleeves Records; Greensleeves was acquired by VP in 2008, and with Greensleeves' catalogue of over 12,000 songs, VP became the largest reggae label and publisher in the world. VP has also issued the compilations series Strictly the Best, which has now reached over 50 volumes.

VP Records was awarded Billboard's Best Independent Label for two consecutive years (2002 and 2003), and has received the award for Best Reggae Imprint Label for three consecutive years. VP was also nominated for Best Independent Reggae Label at the 2003 Billboard Hip-Hop and R&B awards, and had been mentioned and featured in publications such as Vibe magazine, The New York Times, Los Angeles Times, Billboard, and Time magazine.

Vincent Chin died in 2003. The label is now run by the Chins' sons Randy and Christopher, while Patricia Chin continues to assist with the maintenance of her late husband's company as well. In 2007, VP Records began re-issuing classic albums from the 1970s and 1980s on the 17 North Parade label, the address of Randy's Studio, where it all began.

== Artists ==
- Alborosie
- Beres Hammond
- Buju Banton
- Busy Signal
- Christopher Martin
- Gyptian
- Jah Cure
- Jah9
- Jahvillani
- Queen Ifrica
- Raging Fyah
- Richie Spice
- Romain Virgo
- Shaggy
- Spice

== Former artists ==
A

- Admiral Bailey
- Admiral Tibet
- Alpha Blondy
- Ambelique
- Anthony B
- Anthony Red Rose
- Assassin
- Augustus Pablo

B

- Baby Wayne
- Barrington Levy
- Beenie Man
- Bobby Digital
- Bounty Killer
- Brian and Tony Gold
- Buccaneer
- Buju Banton
- Bunji Garlin
- Bushman
- Byron Lee

C

- Capleton
- Carlene Davis
- Chevelle Franklyn
- Chaka Demus
- Chezidek
- Cutty Ranks
- Culture

D

- Daddy Screw
- Da'Ville
- Dean Fraser
- Dennis Brown
- Denroy Morgan
- Dirtsman
- Don Campbell
- Duane Stephenson

E

- Elephant Man
- Etana

F

- Fay-Ann Lyons
- Foxy Brown
- Flourgon
- Frankie Paul
- Freddie McGregor

G

- Garnett Silk
- Gentleman
- General Degree
- George Nooks
- Ghost
- Glen Washington
- Gregory Isaacs
- Gussie Clarke

H

- Half Pint
- Henry "Junjo" Lawes

I

- Inner Circle
- I Wayne

J

- Jacob Miller
- Jigsy King
- John Holt
- Johnny Osbourne
- Junior Kelly
- Junior Tucker
- J.C. Lodge

K

- Kashief Lindo
- King Jammy
- Kiprich

L

- Lady Saw
- Leroy Sibbles
- Lieutenant Stitchie
- Luciano
- Lukie D

M

- Mad Cobra
- Marcia Griffiths
- Mavado
- Maxi Priest
- Merciless
- Mighty Diamonds
- Michigan & Smiley
- Mikey Spice
- Morgan Heritage
- Mr. Lexx
- Mr. Vegas

N

- Nadine Sutherland
- Ninjaman
- Nicodemus

O

P

- Papa San
- Pam Hall
- Pinchers

Q

- Queen Ifrica

R

- Red Dragon
- Ras Shiloh
- Richie Stephens

S

- Sanchez
- Sasha
- Screwdriver
- Sean Paul
- Shabba Ranks
- Sharon Forrester
- Simpleton
- Singing Melody
- Spanner Banner
- Spragga Benz
- Sugar Minott

T

- Tanto Metro
- Tanto Metro and Devonte
- Tanya Stephens
- Terror Fabulous
- Thriller U
- Tiger
- Tinga Stewart
- Tony Rebel
- Turbulence
- T.O.K.

U

V

- Voicemail

W

- Warrior King
- Wayne Wonder
- Winston Riley

X

Y

- Yellowman
- Yami Bolo

Z

- Zap Pow

== VP Associated Label Group ==
VP Associated Label Group (VPAL) is a subsidiary of VP Records that allows independent artists to access VP Records' distribution channel, allowing them broader visibility.

== See also ==
- List of record labels
