= Sizzla =

Jamaican reggae musician (born 1976)

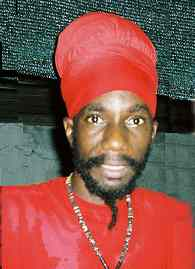
- Sizzla in 2005

Background information
- Also known as: Sizzla, Sizzla Kalonji
- Born: Miguel Orlando Collins; 17 April 1976 (age 50)
- Origin: St. Mary, Jamaica
- Genres: Reggae, ragga, dancehall
- Occupations: Deejay, singer
- Years active: 1990–present
- Labels: Kalonji, Greensleeves, VP, Digital B, Xterminator

Miguel Orlando Collins (born 17 April 1976), known by his stage name Sizzla Kalonji or Sizzla, is a Jamaican reggae musician. He is one of the most commercially and critically successful contemporary reggae artists and is noted for his high number of releases. As of 2018, he has released 56 solo albums.

== Biography ==
Sizzla was born in St. Mary, Jamaica, to devout Rastafarian parents. Like them, Sizzla subscribes to the Bobo Ashanti branch of the Rastafari movement. He was raised in August Town, Kingston, Jamaica where he studied mechanical engineering at Dunoon High School.

=== Career ===
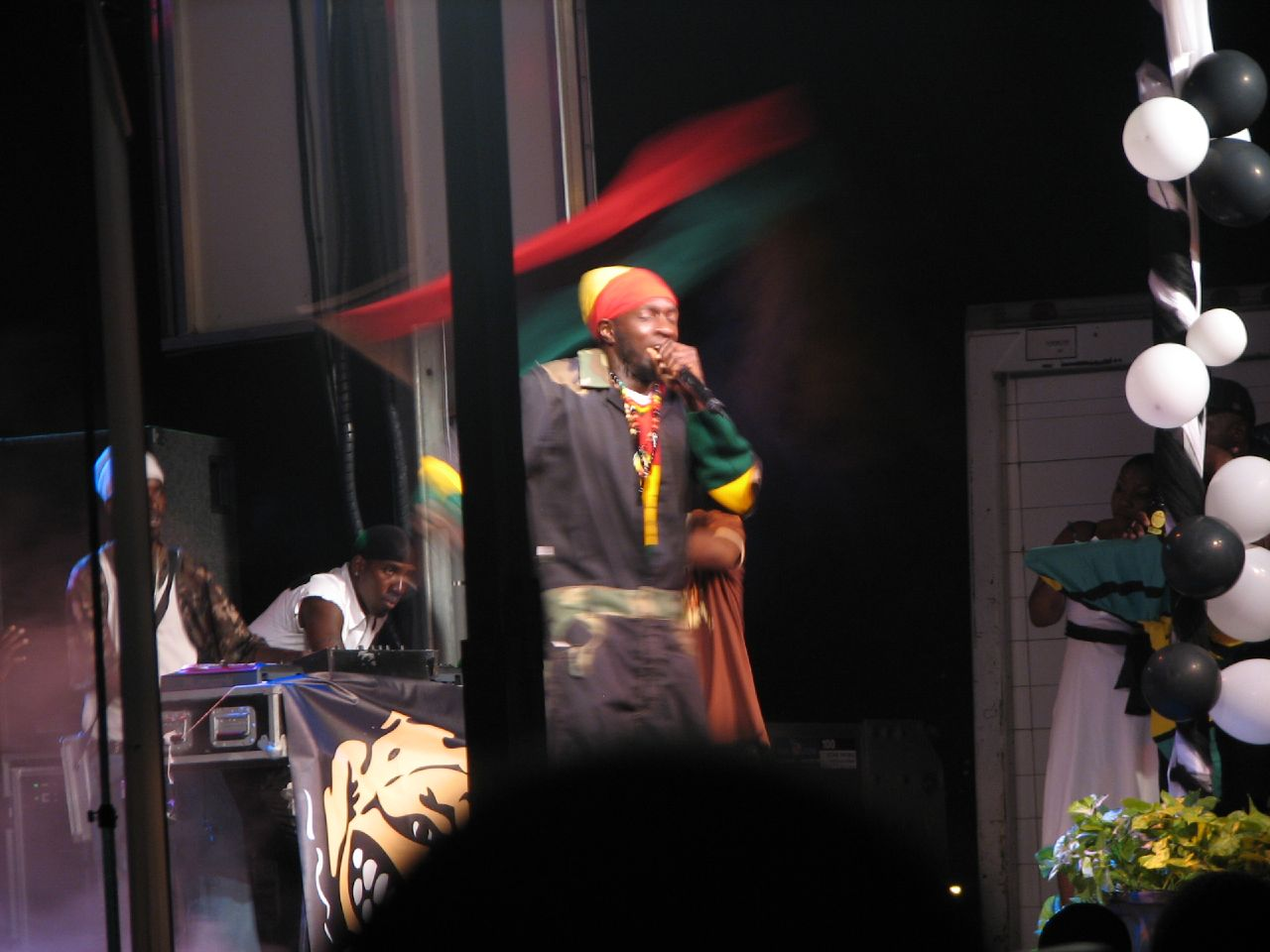
Sizzla performing in 2007

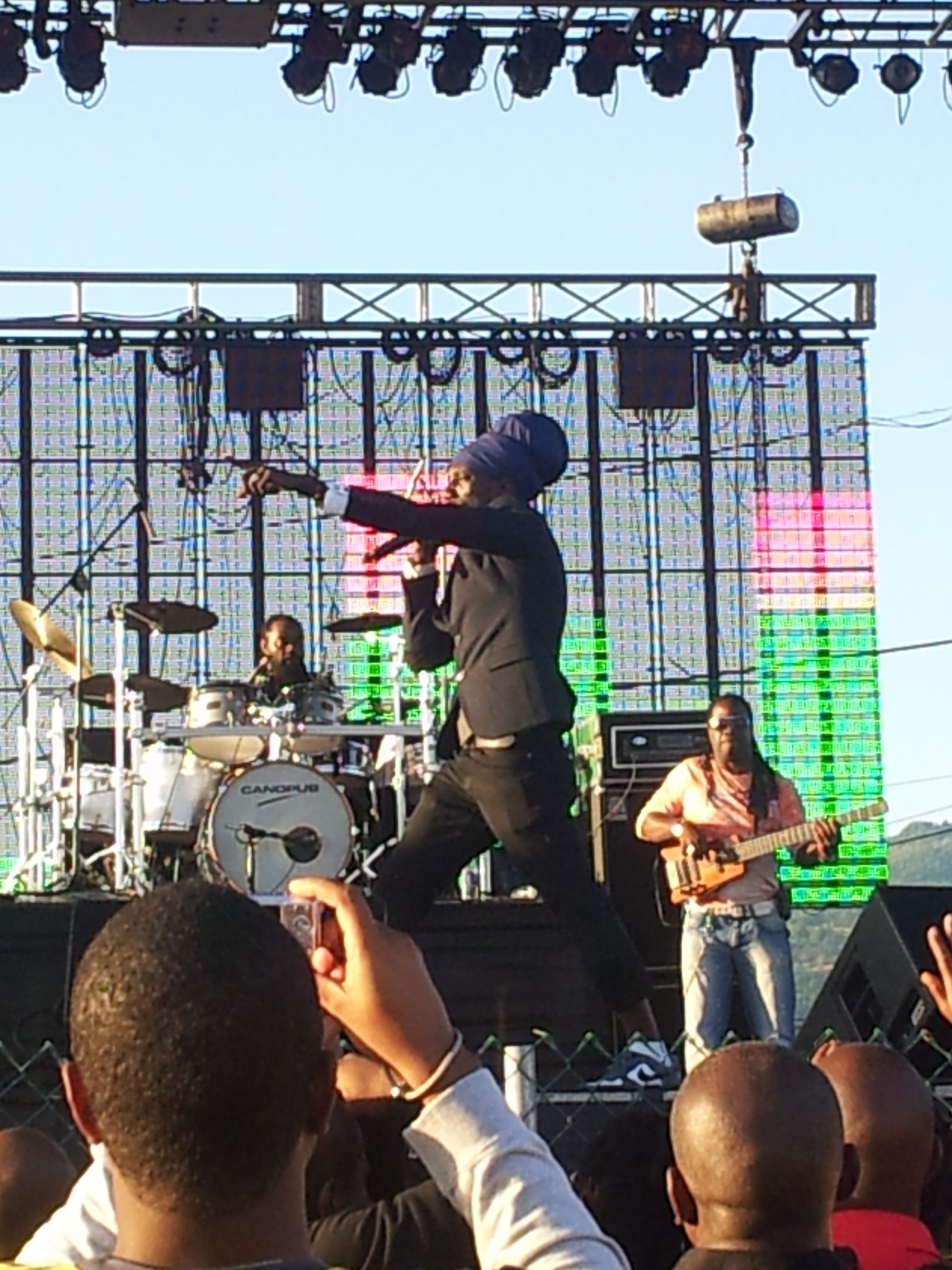
Sizzla (middle) performing in 2013

Sizzla began to develop his own style whilst serving his musical apprenticeship with the Caveman Hi-Fi sound system. He has used his music as a vehicle for his message, kickstarting his recording career in 1995 with a release through the Zagalou label, he then teamed up with "Bobby Digital" Dixon for a series of singles. Extensive touring with fellow Xterminator label mate roots and culture artist Luciano followed, earning Sizzla notoriety .

Homer Harris, who also mentored Buju Banton, got him his first break, introduced Sizzla to top Jamaican saxophonist Dean Fraser, the musical director for Philip "Fatis" Burrell's Xterminator Family. 1995 marked an important turning point for Sizzla when he began working with Fattis. This union led to a run of successful singles and the release of Sizzla's debut album, Burning Up.

The two allied again a year later with the follow-up, Praise Ye Jah (JetStar). Praise Ye Jah was quickly trumped by his release of the Dixon-produced Black Woman & Child that same year. The title track was a smash hit and became something of a cultural reggae anthem. Sizzla scored several more hits during 1997, including "Like Mountain," "Babylon Cowboy," "Kings of the Earth," and the Luciano duet "Build a Better World". This hot streak kicked off an enormously productive recording binge that lasted over the next several years, with much of his output still done for Burrell.

Along with universal praise came Sizzla's first nomination for Best International Reggae Artist of the Year at the 1998 MOBO Awards and a place in various magazines' top 100 albums of the year. Sizzla has since released several dozen albums, including 1998's Kalonji and Royal Son of Ethiopia from 1999. 1999 also saw him receive his second MOBO nomination. Sizzla remains a constant presence in the reggae charts worldwide. Currently, Sizzla has 21 albums that have made it onto the Billboard's Top Reggae Albums music chart, the highest Words of Truth, reaching the peak position of No. 5.

Sizzla Kalonji has released over 45 solo albums and over fifteen combination albums, crossing different genres of Reggae. He has started his own record company, Kalonji Records; which in a joint venture with Damon Dash Music Group and Koch Records, released the album, The Overstanding, in November 2006. This was his third album released through Kalonji Records; as well as Black History and Life.

Sizzla, along with reggae recording artists such as Capleton, Norris Man, Turbulence, Buju Banton, and Anthony B, are credited with leading a movement toward a re-embracement of Rastafarian values in contemporary reggae music by recording material which is concerned primarily with spirituality and social consciousness, explores common themes, such as Babylon's corrupting influence, the disenfranchisement of ghetto youth, oppression of the black nation and Sizzla's abiding faith in Jah and resistance against perceived agents of oppression.

Sizzla's 2008 effort, Ghetto Youth-ology, is produced by the Firehouse Crew, the same who produced Sizzla's debut, Burning Up.

In 2013 he released the album The Messiah. In January 2014 it was nominated for a Grammy Award, his first nomination. In 2014 Sizzla was featured in the song and video for Stephen Marley's single "Rock Stone."

His sons Raheem Collins and Melech Collons have followed him into a career in music, working under the name Reemus k and Skorcha.

In August 2025, Jamaican reggae artist Sizzla Kalonji was honored at the Lauderhill Performing Arts Center in Florida, where he received the Key to the City of Lauderhill from Mayor Denise Grant and a special citation from the United States Congress. The recognition was part of Jamaica’s 63rd Independence celebrations in South Florida and acknowledged Sizzla’s three decades of contribution to reggae music, his role in promoting Rastafarian culture, and his wider impact as a cultural ambassador within the Jamaican diaspora and beyond.

=== Judgement Yard ===
Judgement Yard was established as a community centre in August Town, an eastern suburb of Kingston, Jamaica, by Sizzla Kalonji. Although Judgement Yard is an organisation of sorts, it is also a geographic location at 41 August Town Road, which is where Sizzla maintains one of his residences. Judgement Yard is also the home of Kalonji's state of the art studio, as well as his record label, Kalonji Records. As the owner and founder of the Yard, Kalonji is responsible for many youths in the community of August Town, as well as youths who come from other areas to seek assistance and guidance in life as well as music. He is an influence to many. Many of these same youths who are members of Judgement Yard fraternity are musicians or have some direct affiliation with the music through production works, artiste works, etc. Sizzla has recorded songs with the prominent artists in Judgement Yard, Joseph Shepherd, Bobo David and G-Mac.

=== Zimbabwe ===
In February 2010, Sizzla travelled to Zimbabwe to perform at the 86th birthday celebration of former Zimbabwean President Robert Mugabe. There was a near-riot during his performance, including beatings of crowd members by police, causing Sizzla to temporarily halt his performance and ask the police to cease the beatings.

Later that year, Sizzla was "rewarded" with a farm in the country, with the artist stating he was "here to stay" in Zimbabwe. He also voiced plans to begin an agro-business and build a recording studio in the country. The moves were not without controversy, particularly among Mugabe detractors who insisted he not perform for the President. Sizzla refused to condemn Mugabe post-performance, while insisting the land he received was not a reward from the Zimbabwean government, but given to him by the local people in appreciation for his performance. He also stated plans to eventually make Zimbabwe his permanent home.

=== Motorcycle accident ===
On 24 August 2011, Sizzla was hit by a bus while riding his motorcycle along the Salem main road, near Runaway Bay in St. Ann, Jamaica, leading to many false reports of the singer's death. He resumed recording by the beginning of the following year. In October 2019, he was yet again involved in another motorcycle accident and was hospitalized for a broken ankle.

=== Controversy ===
Sizzla has faced backlash due to the anti-gay lyrics in some of his recordings, causing the cancellation of many international concert events.

In 2004, he was barred from entering the United Kingdom for several concerts. OutRage!, a British LGBT rights group, alleged that some of Sizzla's songs contain lyrics that advocate violence against LGBT people. In 2007, Sizzla's concerts in Toronto and Montreal were canceled after protests from Stop Murder Music Canada coalition. Kalonji's song titled, "Nah Apologize", was recorded in 2004. In 2008 his visa was cancelled, preventing him from entering Germany after performing half of his tour and he was sent back to the United States. Sizzla maintains his stance that he is an artist using his creative expression and freedom of speech but will speak out against injustice where he sees it. In 2009 and 2010 several concerts in Germany were cancelled after public protests against the concerts. In 2012 concerts were cancelled in Madrid (Spain), Ghent, Belgium, Stockholm, Sweden and Lisbon, Portugal after public protests. Kalonji Muzik issued a statement after the cancellations that he abides by the laws of every country that he performs in and is not trying to invoke or incite violence against anyone.
