= Black Uhuru discography =

The discography of Jamaican reggae group Black Uhuru consists of at least 103 singles and EPs, 19 studio albums and at least 16 Live/Dub albums.

== Singles and EPs ==
Black Uhuru have issued at least 103 singles and EPs.

== Albums ==
=== Derrick "Duckie" Simpson, Michael Rose, Errol Nelson(AKA Wilson) ===
- 1977 – Love Crisis
- 1981 – Black Sounds of Freedom (Love Crisis re-edition)

=== Group: Derek "Duckie" Simpson, Michael Rose, Sandra "Puma" Jones, Sly Dunbar, Robbie Shakespeare ===
- 1979 – Showcase
- 1980 – Black Uhuru (Showcase re-edition)
- 1980 – Sinsemilla
- 1981 – Red
- 1982 – Chill Out
- 1983 – Guess Who's Coming to Dinner (Black Uhuru re-edition)
- 1983 – Anthem
- 1985 – Reggae Greats (compilation)

=== Group: Derrick "Duckie" Simpson, Delroy "Junior" Reid, Sandra "Puma" Jones, Sly Dunbar, Robbie Shakespeare ===
- 1986 – Brutal

=== Group: Derrick "Duckie" Simpson, Delroy "Junior" Reid, Olafunke ===
- 1987 – Positive

=== Group: Derrick "Duckie" Simpson, Garth Dennis, Don Carlos ===
- 1990 – Now
- 1991 – Iron Storm
- 1993 – Mystical Truth
- 1994 – Strongg

=== Group: Derrick "Duckie" Simpson, Jenifah Nyah, Andrew Bees ===
- 1998 – Unification
- 2001 – Dynasty
- 2018 – As the World Turns
- 2022 – New Day

=== Live / Dub albums ===
- 1982 – Uhuru in Dub
- 1982 – Tear It Up – Live (album and video)
- 1983 – The Dub Factor
- 1984 – Live
- 1986 – Brutal Dub
- 1987 – The Positive Dub
- 1988 – Live in New York City
- 1990 – Now Dub
- 1990 – Love Dub (Uhuru in Dub re-edition)
- 1992 – Iron Storm Dub
- 1993 – Mystical Truth Dub
- 1994 – Strongg Dubb
- 2000 – Live 1984
- 2001 – In Dub
- 2001 – Dubbin' It Live (summer 2001, at Paléo Festival)
- 2013 - Live in Germany 1981 (Rockpalast on CD and DVD)
