= Sly and Robbie discography =

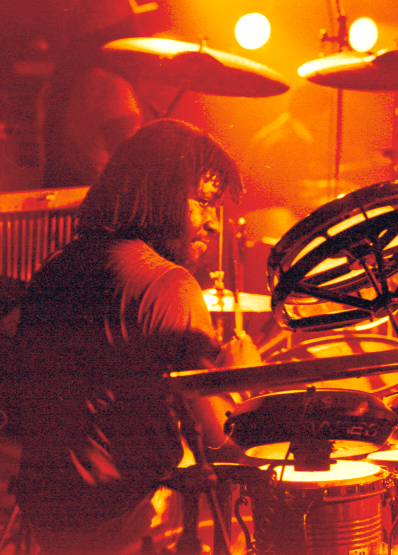
Sly Dunbar, touring with Peter Tosh, Top Rank, Cardiff.

This is the discography for Jamaican reggae production duo Sly and Robbie.

== Albums ==
Artist	Title	Year	Label
Sly and Robbie	Crucial Reggae	1981	Island Mango
Sly and Robbie	Sly and Robbie Present Taxi	1981	Island
Sly and Robbie	Rebel Soldier [Soljie]	1982	Taxi
Sly and Robbie	Kings of Reggae	1983	Keystone
Sly and Robbie	Sounds of Taxi	1984	Taxi
Sly and Robbie	Language Barrier	1985	Island
Sly and Robbie	A Dub Experience	1985	Island
Sly and Robbie	The Sting	1986	Moving Target
Sly and Robbie	Electro Reggae	1986	Island
Sly and Robbie	Taxi Fare	1987	Heartbeat
Sly and Robbie	presents Sound of Taxi 3	1987	Taxi
Sly and Robbie	Rhythm Killers	1987	Island
Sly and Robbie	Taxi Connection Live in London	1987	Island
Sly and Robbie	Fire / Ticket To Ride	1987	Island
Sly and Robbie	The Summit	1988	Greensleeves
Sly and Robbie	present Gregory Isaacs	1988	RAS
Sly and Robbie	Two Rhythms Clash	1989	RAS
Sly and Robbie	Silent Assassin with KRS-ONE and BDP	1989	Island
Sly and Robbie	Rhythm Killers	1990	Polygram Records
Sly and Robbie	Hits 1978–1990	1990	Sonic Sounds
Sly and Robbie	DJ Riot	1990	Island
Sly and Robbie	Dubs for Tubs	1990	Rohit
Sly and Robbie	Sixties Seventies and Eighties	1991	Mango
Sly and Robbie	Dub Rockers Delight	1991	Magnum Music Group
Sly and Robbie	Sound of Sound	1991	Pow Wow
Sly and Robbie	Remember Precious Times	1992	RAS Taxi
Sly and Robbie	Ragga Pon Top	1993	Pow Wow
Sly and Robbie	Many Moods of	1994	Sonic Sounds
Sly and Robbie	present Mykall Rose	1995	Taxi
Sly and Robbie	Funkcronomicon	1995	Axiom
Sly and Robbie	Hail up the Taxi	1996	Island
Sly and Robbie	Mysteries of Creation	1996	Axiom
Sly and Robbie	meet King Tubby	1996	House of Reggae
Sly and Robbie	The Punishers	1996	Island
Sly and Robbie	Mambo Taxi	1997	Island
Sly and Robbie	Hail up Taxi 2	1998	Tabou1 / Taxi
Sly and Robbie	present Taxi Christmas	1998	RAS
Sly and Robbie	Friends	1998	Island
Sly and Robbie	Drum and Bass Strip to the Bone by Howie B	1999	Palm Pictures
Sly and Robbie	Massive	1999	nyc music
Sly and Robbie	Sly & Robbie	1999	Rhino
Sly and Robbie	Version Born (produced by Bill Laswell)	2004	Palm Pictures
Sly and Robbie	Blackwood Dub	2012	groove attack
Sly and Robbie	Rhythm Doubles	2006	Rootdown Records
Sly and Robbie	Underwater Dub	2014	groove attack
Sly and Robbie	Dubmaster Voyage	2014	Tabou1 / Taxi
Sly and Robbie	Dubrising	2014	Tabou1
Sly and Robbie	Sly & Robbie vs. Roots Radics: The Final Battle	2019	Serious reggae / Afro records
Sly and the Revolutionaries	Black Ash Dub	1978	Trojan
Sly Dunbar	Simply Slyman	1978	Virgin Frontline
Sly Dunbar	Sly Wicked and Slick	1979	Virgin
Sly Dunbar	Sly-Go-Ville	1982	Island

== As contributors ==
Artist	Title	Year	Label
Amp Fiddler	Inspiration Information	2008	Strut Records
Barry Reynolds	I Scare Myself	1982	Island
Beenie Man	Maestro	1996	Shocking Vibes
Black Uhuru	Positive	1987	Greensleeves
Black Uhuru	Brutal	1986	Greensleeves
Black Uhuru	Anthem	1984	Island
Black Uhuru	The Dub Factor	1983	Island
Black Uhuru	Chill Out	1982	Island
Black Uhuru	Tear It Up	1982	Island
Black Uhuru	Red	1981	Island
Black Uhuru	Sinsemilla	1980	Island
Black Uhuru	Showcase	1979	Virgin
Bob Dylan	Infidels	1983	Columbia
Bob Dylan	Empire Burlesque	1985	Columbia
Brent Dowe	My Everything	unknown	Circulation Music/Records
Bunny Wailer	Food/Serious Things	1986	Solomonic
Bunny Wailer	Dubdisco	1980	Solomonic
Bunny Wailer	Marketplace	1984	Solomonic
Bunny Wailer	sings The Wailers	1980	Solomonic Island
Bunny Wailer	Roots Radics Rockers Reggae	1983	Shanachie
Chaka Demus & Pliers	Tease Me	1993	Mango
Chaka Demus & Pliers	For Every Kinda People	1996	Island
Charlie Chaplin	Que Dem	1986	Powerhouse
Cornell Campbell	Follow Instructions	1982	Mobiler
Culture	Two Sevens Clash	1978	Joe Gibbs
Culture	Harder than the Rest	1978	Virgin
Cutty Ranks	Can I Touch U Baby	1999	Circulation Music/Records
Dennis Brown	Brown Sugar	1988	RAS
Don Carlos	Spread Out	1983	Channel One (Kingston, JA)
Eljuri	El Aire	2008	Manovill Records
Eljuri	Empuja	2012	Manovill Records
Fiona Branson with Sly & Robbie	London Country Girl	2015	NutCase Records
Foundation	Heart feel it	1989	Island
Frankie Paul	Strictly ReggaeMusic	1983	Londisc
Grace Jones	Living My Life	1982	Island
Grace Jones	Nightclubbing	1981	Island
Grace Jones	Warm Leatherette	1980	Island
Grace Jones	Hurricane	2008	Wall of Sound, PIAS
Gregory Isaacs	Showcase	1980	Taxi
Gregory Isaacs	Cool Ruler	1978	Front Line
Gregory Isaacs	Soon Forward	1979	Front Line
Gwen Guthrie	Gwen Guthrie	1982	Island
Half Pint	In fine Style	1984	Sunset
Half Pint	Victory	1988	RAS
Half Pint	Greetings	1987	Jet Star
Half Pint	showcase w. Michael Palmer	1986	Greensleeves
Half Pint/Junior Delgado	I want your love	1987	Powerhouse
Herbie Hancock	Rockit 12 inch maxi	1983	CBS
Home T4	Sly & Robbie present	1984	Taxi
I Wayne	Lava Ground	2005	VP
I Wayne	Book of Life	2007	VP
Ian Dury	Lord Upminster	1981	Polydor
Ini Kamoze	Pirate	1986	Island
Ini Kamoze	Statement	1985	Island
Ini Kamoze	Ini Kamoze	1984	Island
The Itals	Brutal out Deh	1981	Nighthawk
Jacob Miller	Jacob Killer Miller	1980	Island
Jimmy Cliff	Follow My Mind	1975	Warner
Jimmy Riley	Rhythm Driven	1981	Island
Joe Cocker	Sheffield Steel	1982	Island
Kazumi Watanabe	Mobo 2	1983	Gramavision Records
Kazumi Watanabe	Mobo 1	1982	Gramavision
Ky-Mani Marley	Like Father Like Son	1996	Warner Bros. Records/Rhino
Linval Thompson	Starlight	1988	Mango
Linval Thompson	Linvall	1977	Vista Sounds
Linval Thompson	Rockers From Channel One	1979	Trojan
Marianne Faithfull	Lola R. For Ever (From the tribute album Monsieur Gainsbourg Revisited)	2006	Barclay
Material	The Third Power	1991	Axiom
Material	Seven Souls	1989	Island
Matisyahu	"Jerusalem (Out of the Darkness Comes Light)"	2006	JDub
Maxi Priest	Maxi	1987	Virgin
Michael Franti & Spearhead	All Rebel Rockers	2008	ANTI-
Michael Franti & Spearhead	Yell Fire!	2006	Boo Boo Wax & ANTI-
Michael Palmer	showcase w. Half Pint	1986	Greensleeves
Michael Rose	X-uhuru	1998	Tabou 1 / Taxi
Mick Jagger	She's the Boss	1985	CBS
Mighty Diamonds	Unruly Pickney	1982	MR
Mighty Diamonds	Tell Me What Wrong	1980	JIL
Mighty Diamonds	Vital Selection	1981	Virgin
Mighty Diamonds	Money Love	1982	Powerhouse
Mighty Diamonds	Backstage	1983	Music Works
Mighty Diamonds	Dubwise	1982	Music Works
Mista Savona	Havana Meets Kingston	2017	ABC Music
Monty Alexander	meets Sly and Robbie	2000	Telarc
Mr. Anonymous	Mr. Anonymous	2005	KAB America
No Doubt	Hey Baby	2001	Interscope
No Doubt	Underneath It All	2002	Interscope
No-Maddz	Romance	2014	Taxi
Peter Tosh	Wanted Dread and Alive	1980	EMI
Peter Tosh	Live at Montreux	1979	
Peter Tosh	Mystic Man	1979	EMI
Peter Tosh	Bush Doctor	1978	Rolling Stones
Peter Tosh	Equal Rights	1977	Columbia
Prince Far I	Cry Tuff Dub encounter II	1979	Virgin's Front Line
Prince Jammy	Kamikaze Dub	1996	Trojan
Prince Jammy	A Dub Extravaganza	1992	Charley
Revolutionaires	Goldmine Dub	1979	Greensleeves
Revolutionaries	Outlaw Dub	1979	Trojan
Revolutionaries	Dutch Man Dub	1978	Burning Vibrations
Rico	Man from Wareika	1977	Island
Ronnie Davis	Crucial	1978	Big Mac Soul Power
Serge Gainsbourg	Negusa Nagast	1981	Polygram
Serge Gainsbourg	Mauvaises nouvelles des etoiles	1981	Phillips
Serge Gainsbourg	au Palace	1980	Phillips
Serge Gainsbourg	Aux Armes	1979	Phillips
Shabba Ranks	A Mi Shabba	1995	Epic
Simply Red	Life	1995	East West Records
Sinéad O'Connor	Throw Down Your Arms	2005	Chocolate and Vanilla
Sugar Minott	A True	1984	Arrival
Sugar Minott	Buy Off The Bar	1983	Powerhouse
Sugar Minott	Sugar & Spice	1990	RAS
Suggs	The Lone Ranger	1995	WEA
Tiken Jah Fakoly	Coup de gueule	2004	Barclay
Toots Hibbert	Toots in Memphis	1988	Island Mango
Vanessa da Mata	Sim	2007	Sony BMG
Viktor Lazlo	Back To Front	1996	East/West Records
Wailing Souls	Live On	1994	Island
Yami Bolo	Freedom and Liberation	1998	Tabou 1 / Taxi
Yellowman	Yellow like Cheese	1987	RAS

== Remixes ==
Artist	Title	Year	Label
Britney Spears	Piece of Me (Sly & Robbie Remix) (featuring Cherine Anderson)	2006	Jive Records
Fugees	Fu Gee La Remix	1996	Columbia
Madonna	Supernatural (Remix)	1992	Warner Bros. Records
Madonna	Give It 2 Me (Remix)	2008	Warner Bros. Records
New Order	Ruined in a Day	1993	Warner Bros. Records

== Various ==
Artist	Title	Year	Label
Various	Music Works Showcase	1982	Music Works
Various	Raiders of the Lost Dub	1981	Mango
Various	Down in Jamaica	1990	Invitation
Various	La Trenga	1997	VP
