= Great Train Robbery (song) =

Single by Black Uhuru

from the album Brutal
- Released: 1986
- Studio: Music Mountain Studios (Kingston, Jamaica)
- Genre: Reggae
- Length: 3:59; 4:20
- Label: Real Authentic Sound
- Songwriter(s): Delroy "Junior" Reid
- Producer(s): Arthur Baker; Doctor Dread

"Great Train Robbery" is a song by Jamaican reggae group Black Uhuru. It was recorded at Music Mountain Studios in Kingston, Jamaica, and released as a single of their studio album Brutal via Real Authentic Sound in 1986. Production was handled by Doctor Dread and Arthur Baker. The single peaked at number 31 in New Zealand, number 49 in the Netherlands, number 62 in the United Kingdom, and was featured in the 2004 video game Grand Theft Auto: San Andreas on its fictional reggae radio station K-JAH West.

== Track listing ==
7"
No.	Title	Lyrics	Producer(s)	Length
1.	"The Great Train Robbery"	D. Reid	Doctor Dread; Arthur Baker	4:20
2.	"The Great Train Robbery" (Dub Mix)	D. Reid	Doctor Dread; Arthur Baker	3:40

12", Maxi single
No.	Title	Lyrics	Producer(s)	Length
1.	"The Great Train Robbery" (Dance Remix)	D. Reid	Doctor Dread; Arthur Baker	9:38
2.	"The Great Train Robbery" (Dub)	D. Reid	Doctor Dread; Arthur Baker	6:21
3.	"The Great Train Robbery" (Vocal)	D. Reid	Doctor Dread; Arthur Baker	5:50

== Personnel ==
- Delroy "Junior" Reid – lyrics, vocals
- Sandra Jones – backing vocals
- Derrick "Duckie" Simpson – backing vocals
- Ira Siegel – guitar
- Robert Warren Dale Shakespeare – bass
- Anthony Brissett – piano
- Jeffrey S. Bova – synthesizer
- Lowell Fillmore Dunbar – drums
- Bashiri Johnson – timbales & percussion
- Arthur Henry Baker – effects, producer, mixing, re-mixing
- Gary Himelfarb – producer
- Dave O'grin – engineering, mixing
- Conrad Malcolm – engineering, recording
- Don Grossinger – mastering
- Aldo Marin – editor
- Kelly Lee – artwork
- Tommy Noonan – photography

== Chart positions ==
Chart (1986)	Peak position
Netherlands (MegaCharts)	49
New Zealand (Recorded Music NZ)	31
UK Singles (OCC)	62
