= Chill out (disambiguation) =

Chill out or chill-out music is a laid-back style of music.

Chill out may also refer to:

- Chill Out (Black Uhuru album), 1982, or the title track
- Chill Out (John Lee Hooker album), 1995, or the title track
- Chill Out (KLF album), 1990
- COW / Chill Out, World!, a 2016 album by The Orb
- "Chill Out", a song by Ray BLK

== See also ==
- Chilling effect (disambiguation)
- Chilled 1991–2008
