= Strongg =

Studio album by Black Uhuru
- Released: 1994
- Studio: Leggo Sound Studio (Kingston, Jamaica)
- Genre: Reggae
- Length: 48:17
- Label: Mesa Recordings
- Producer: George Nauful (exec.); Jim Snowden (exec.); Tony "Asha" Brissett; Black Uhuru

Black Uhuru chronology
Mystical Truth (1993)	Strongg (1994)	Strongg Dubb (1994)

Professional ratings
Review scores
Source	Rating
AllMusic	3/5 stars

Strongg is a studio album by the Jamaican reggae band Black Uhuru. It was released in 1994 through Mesa Recordings. The album peaked at number 6 on the US Billboard Reggae Albums chart and was nominated for Grammy Award for Best Reggae Album at 37th Annual Grammy Awards.

== Track listing ==
No.	Title	Writer(s)	Producer(s)	Length
1.	"Brand New World"	D. Simpson; Y. Afari	Derrick "Duckie" Simpson; Tony "Asha" Brissett	4:25
2.	"Strongg"	E. Spencer	Black Uhuru	4:03
3.	"Eye of an Angel"	G. Dennis; S. Dennis	Black Uhuru	4:13
4.	"From Jump Street"	E. Spencer	Black Uhuru	4:05
5.	"Reggae Song"	R. Dennis	Black Uhuru	2:44
6.	"Spectrum"	D. Simpson; L. Nugent	Derrick "Duckie" Simpson; Tony "Asha" Brissett	4:25
7.	"Time Material and Space"	R. Dennis; L. Dennis	Black Uhuru	4:02
8.	"Genocide"	E. Spencer	Black Uhuru	3:39
9.	"Big Bad Bully"	E. Spencer	Black Uhuru	3:52
10.	"Yes I"	D. Simpson; R. Tate	Derrick "Duckie" Simpson	4:58
11.	"Conscience Calling"	R. Dennis; R. Palmer	Black Uhuru	3:47
12.	"I Pray"	D. Simpson	Derrick "Duckie" Simpson; Tony "Asha" Brissett	4:04
Total length:				48:17

== Personnel ==
- Derrick "Duckie" Simpson – vocals, composer, producer
- Euvin Spencer – composer, arranger
- Rudolph "Garth" Dennis – composer
- Vince Black – guitar (tracks: 1–9, 11–12)
- Leebert "Gibby" Morrison – guitar (track 10)
- Earl "Bagga" Walker – bass (tracks: 1–4, 8–9, 11)
- Derrick Barnett – bass (tracks: 5–6, 10, 12)
- Christopher Meridith – bass (track 7)
- Anthony Brissett – keyboards (tracks: 1, 3, 5–7, 10–12), producer (tracks: 1, 6, 12)
- Keith Sterling-McLeod – keyboards (tracks: 2–5, 8–9)
- Dean Fraser – horns (tracks: 1, 3, 6, 10)
- Rass Brass – horns (track 1)
- Sydney Wolfe – horns (track 7), percussion (tracks: 1–9, 11–12)
- Jermaine Forde – drums (tracks: 1, 6, 10)
- Marcus "Rangatan" Smith – drums (tracks: 2–5, 7–9, 11)
- Lowell Fillmore Dunbar – drums (tracks: 10, 12)
- Christopher "Sky Juice" Blake – percussion (track 10)
- George Nauful – executive producer
- Jim Snowden – executive producer
- Steven J. C. Stanley – mixing
- Junior Edwards – engineering
- Yasus Afari – arranging (track 1)
- Richard Tate – arranging (track 10)
- Michelle Laurencot – art direction & design
- Daniel Nevins – artwork

== Charts ==
Chart (1994)	Peak position
US Reggae Albums (Billboard)	6
