= Sinsemilla (album) =

Studio album by Black Uhuru
- Released: July 1980
- Recorded: January 26, 1980
- Studios: Channel One, Kingston, Jamaica
- Genre: Reggae
- Length: 36:43
- Labels: Mango, Island, Warner Bros.
- Producers: Sly Dunbar, Robbie Shakespeare

Black Uhuru chronology
Showcase (1979)	Sinsemilla (1980)	Red (1981)

Sinsemilla is the third album by Jamaican reggae band Black Uhuru, released in 1980 on the Island Records subsidiary Mango. The album helped the band achieve a global fanbase.

== Critical reception ==
Professional ratings
Review scores
Source	Rating
AllMusic	5/5 stars
Christgau's Record Guide	B+
The Encyclopedia of Popular Music	3/5 stars
MusicHound Rock: The Essential Album Guide	4/5 stars
The Rolling Stone Album Guide	3.5/5 stars

Trouser Press wrote that the album "delivers a level of consistency only Bob Marley himself had achieved." The Miami New Times wrote that "by 1980's Sinsemilla, Black Uhuru was a paragon of politics, close harmonies, pumping grooves, and a social awareness as astute and incisive as Marley's." Spin deemed Sinsemilla a "classic reggae" album, writing that Sly and Robbie's "trademark synth-drum grooves drove the group's harmonies like a diddling steam turbine."

== Track listing ==
All tracks are written by Michael Rose.

No.	Title	Length
1.	"Happiness"	4:21
2.	"World Is Africa"	5:17
3.	"Push Push"	4:12
4.	"There Is Fire"	5:02
5.	"No Loafing (Sit and Wonder)"	3:59
6.	"Sinsemilla"	5:11
7.	"Endurance"	4:01
8.	"Vampire"	4:34

Bonus tracks 2003
No.	Title	Length
9.	"Sinsemilla" (Discomix)	6:30
10.	"Guess Who's Coming to Dinner" (Discomix)	6:00

== Personnel ==
Black Uhuru

- Michael Rose – lead vocals
- Derrick "Duckie" Simpson – harmony vocals
- Puma Jones – harmony vocals

with:

- Robbie Shakespeare – bass, lead bass on "Vampire"
- Sly Dunbar – drums, percussion, electronic drums
- Ansel Collins – acoustic piano, organ
- Jimmy Becker – harmonica
- Radcliffe "Dougie" Bryan – lead guitar
- Bertram "Ranchie" McLean – rhythm guitar
- Uziah "Sticky" Thompson – percussion

Technical

- Lister Hewan Lowe, Lowell "Sly" Dunbar, Robert "Robbie" Shakespeare – executive producer
- Ernest Hookim, Colonel Maxie (Lancelot "Maxie" McKenzie) – recording engineer
- Tony Wright – cover illustration
