= Big Ship =

Big Ship or The Big Ship may refer to:

- Big Ship (Freddie McGregor album), 1982
- Big Ship (EP), a 1987 extended play by Cardiacs
- "Big Ship" (Cliff Richard song), 1969
- "The Big Ship" (Brian Eno song), a song from the album Another Green World by Brian Eno
- "Big Ship", a cover of the Cardiacs track by Ultrasound from Leader of the Starry Skies: A Tribute to Tim Smith, Songbook 1
- "The Big Ship", a nickname of Australian cricketer Warwick Armstrong (1879–1947)
