= Bonanza (disambiguation) =

Bonanza is an American western television series (1959–1973).

Bonanza may also refer to:

== Towns and cities ==
=== United States ===
- Bonanza, Arkansas
- Bonanza, Colorado
- Bonanza, Georgia
- Bonanza, Idaho
- Bonanza, Kentucky
- Bonanza, Missouri
- Bonanza, Oregon
- Bonanza, Utah
- Bonanza City, New Mexico
- Bonanza Grove, Minnesota

=== Elsewhere ===
- Bonanza, Alberta, Canada
- Bonanza, Spain
- Bonanza, Nicaragua

== Other uses ==
- Comstock Lode bonanza
- Bonanza, "Book Four" portion of the Baroque Cycle novel The Confusion
- Ponderosa/Bonanza Steakhouse, restaurant
- Bonanza Gift Shop
- Bonanza Range, a mountain range on Vancouver Island, British Columbia, Canada
- Bonanza (Michael Rose album), 1999
- Bonanza Banzai band, 1988
- Bonanza (Panda album), 2012
- Beechcraft Bonanza, a general aviation aircraft
- "Bonanza" (song), the theme song for the TV series of the same name

== See also ==
- Bonanza Creek, a tributary of the Klondike River the Yukon Territory, Canada
- Bohnanza, a German-style card game
- Bananza (disambiguation)
