= The Great Train Robbery =

The Great Train Robbery may refer to:

- Great Train Robbery (1963), of £2.6 million from a British train
- Great Gold Robbery, of gold worth £12,000 from a British train in 1855

== Film and television ==
- The Great Train Robbery (1903 film), an American silent short Western film
- The Great K & A Train Robbery, a 1926 American Western silent film
- The Great Train Robbery (1941 film), an American low-budget crime-western
- "The Great Train Robbery", an episode of I Love Lucy, 1955
- The Great St. Trinian's Train Robbery, the 1966 fourth film of the St Trinians film saga
- The First Great Train Robbery, a 1978 film, released in the U.S. as The Great Train Robbery, directed by Michael Crichton, based on his novel
- Old 587: The Great Train Robbery, a 2000 film that involves the steam locomotive Nickel Plate Road 587
- The Great Train Robbery (2013 TV series), a British mini-series

== Other uses ==
- The Great Train Robbery (board game), a 1970s board game based on the Great Train Robbery (1963)
- The Great Train Robbery (novel), a 1975 historical novel by Michael Crichton, about the Great Gold Robbery (1855)
- "Great Train Robbery" (song), by Black Uhuru, 1986
- "The Great Train Robbery", a song/tune by Mountain on their 1971 album Nantucket Sleighride

== See also ==
- Train robbery
