= Brutal (Black Uhuru album) =

Studio album by Black Uhuru
- Released: 1986
- Recorded: 1985–1986
- Studio: Music Mountain Studios (Kingston, Jamaica); Shakedown Studio (New York, NY); Lion and Fox (Washington, D.C.)
- Genre: Reggae
- Length: 42:22
- Label: Real Authentic Sound
- Producer: Arthur Baker; Black Uhuru; Doctor Dread; Steven Stanley

Black Uhuru chronology
Anthem (1983)	Brutal (1986)	Brutal Dub (1986)

Singles from Brutal
- 1. "Conviction Or Fine" Released: 1985; 2. "Fit You Haffe Fit" Released: 1985; 3. "The Great Train Robbery" Released: 1986; 4. "Let Us Pray" Released: 1986; 5. "Dread In The Mountain" Released: 1987

Professional ratings
Review scores
Source	Rating
AllMusic	3/5 stars
Christgau's Record Guide	B+

Brutal is a studio album by the Jamaican reggae band Black Uhuru. It was released in 1986 through Real Authentic Sound, making it their first album on the label. Audio production was handled by Doctor Dread, Arthur Baker, Steven Stanley and Black Uhuru. The album peaked at number 36 in New Zealand, number 73 in the Netherlands, and was nominated for Grammy Award for Best Reggae Recording at 29th Annual Grammy Awards. The album spawned five singles: "Conviction Or Fine", "Fit You Haffe Fit", "The Great Train Robbery", "Let Us Pray" and "Dread In The Mountain". The single "Great Train Robbery" also made it to charts, reaching #31 in New Zealand, #49 in the Netherlands, and #69 in the United Kingdom, reaching overall populairty.

== Track listing ==
No.	Title	Length
1.	"Brutal"	4:07
2.	"Fit You Haffe Fit"	4:22
3.	"Great Train Robbery"	5:51
4.	"City Vibes"	3:58
5.	"Uptown Girl"	3:25
6.	"Conviction of a Fine"	4:33
7.	"Dread in the Mountain"	4:03
8.	"Let Us Pray"	4:15
9.	"Vision"	4:18
10.	"Reggae With You"	3:30
Total length:		42:22

== Personnel ==
- Delroy "Junior" Reid – lead vocals (tracks: 1–3, 5–8, 10)
- Sandra Jones – lead vocals (track 4), backing vocals
- Derrick Simpson – lead vocals (track 9), backing vocals
- Darryl A. Thompson – lead guitar
- Frank Stepanek – lead guitar
- Ira Siegel – lead guitar
- Wilbert "Willie" Lindo – rhythm guitar
- Robert Warren Dale Shakespeare – bass
- Robert Lyn – organ
- Tyrone Downie – organ & synthesizer
- Anthony Brissett – synthesizer
- Jeffrey S. Bova – synthesizer
- Leonard Brandon Pickett – horns
- Mark Gollehom – horns
- Sly Dunbar – drums
- Bashiri Johnson – percussion
- Christopher "Sky Juice" Burth – percussion
- Gary Himelfarb – producer (tracks: 1, 3–10)
- Steven J. C. Stanley – producer (track 2), engineering (tracks: 2, 6)
- Arthur Henry Baker – producer (track 3), engineering (tracks: 1, 3)
- Jim Fox – engineering (tracks: 4, 5, 7–10)
- Conrad Malcolm – engineering (tracks: 2, 6)
- Dave O'grin – assistant engineering (tracks: 1, 3)
- Kelly Lee – artwork
- Tommy Noonan – photography

== Charts ==
Chart (1986)	Peak position
Dutch Albums (Album Top 100)	73
New Zealand Albums (RMNZ)	36
