= As the World Turns (disambiguation) =

As the World Turns is an American television soap opera.

As the World Turns may also refer to:

- As the World Turns (album), a 2018 album by Black Uhuru
  - "As the World Turns", a song from the album
- "As the World Turns", a song from the 1981 The Sinceros album Pet Rock
- "As the World Turns", a song from the 1999 Eminem album The Slim Shady LP

== See also ==
- As the Earth Turns (disambiguation)
