= Sly and Robbie Present Taxi =

Compilation album by Sly and Robbie
- Released: 1981
- Genre: Reggae, pop
- Label: Island
- Producer: Sly Dunbar, Robbie Shakespeare

Sly and Robbie chronology
Sly and Robbie Present Taxi (1981)	Rebel Soldier (1982)

Sly and Robbie Present Taxi is an album by the Jamaican musical duo Sly and Robbie, released in 1981. It was their first album as a credited duo, with many of the tracks first released on their Taxi record label. Sly and Robbie Present Taxi is dedicated to the Jamaican musician General Echo, who was killed in 1980.

== Production ==
Sly and Robbie recorded the drums and bass first, often tinkering with the tracks until they sounded as if they could have been created by a computer. The duo had verbal agreements with most of the artists on their label, dividing with them whatever profits a song made and putting their share back in to recording. The U.S. Mango release includes Sheila Hylton's cover of the Police's "The Bed's Too Big Without You" and omits Black Uhuru's "World Is Africa". "Smiling Faces Sometimes" is a cover of the Undisputed Truth version of the Motown composition. "My Woman's Love" was written by Curtis Mayfield. General Echo's "Drunken Master" is a tribute to the martial arts film.

== Critical reception ==
Professional ratings
Review scores
Source	Rating
AllMusic	3/5 stars
Bedfordshire on Sunday	4/5 stars
Robert Christgau	A−
The Encyclopedia of Popular Music	4/5 stars
MusicHound World: The Essential Album Guide	3.5 stars
Reggae & Caribbean Music	8/10
The New Rolling Stone Record Guide	4/5 stars
Spin Alternative Record Guide	8/10

The Northern Echo labeled the album "neat Jamaican dance music". Bedfordshire on Sunday praised the "dynamic" production team, and, alluding to Bob Marley's recent death, noted, "The Lion sleeps but the jungle still stirs." Newsday said that "each cut is meticulously crafted, featuring soulful singing and Dunbar and Shakespeare's characteristically solid, flexible rhythms." The Los Angeles Times stated that "this is reggae-as-Jamaican-pop-music, with love as the principal theme." Robert Christgau noted that these "love songs are why Jah made syndrums: reggae as pure pop".

In 1986, The Philadelphia Inquirer praised the "smart, sinuous music".

== Track listing ==
No.	Title	Artist	Length
1.	"My Woman's Love"	Jimmy Riley
2.	"Smiling Faces Sometimes"	Tamlins
3.	"Merry Go Round"	Junior Delgado
4.	"Sitting and Watching"	Dennis Brown
5.	"Hot You're Hot"	Sly Dunbar
6.	"Sweet Sugar Plum"	Wailing Souls
7.	"World Is Africa"	Black Uhuru
8.	"Drunken Master"	General Echo
9.	"Old Broom"	Wailing Souls
10.	"Oh What a Feeling"	Gregory Isaacs
11.	"Heart Made of Stone"	The Viceroys
12.	"Fort Augustus"	Junior Delgado
