= Iron Storm =

Iron Storm can refer to:

- Iron Storm (1995 video game), a turn-based strategy game in the Daisenryaku series published by Working Designs
- Iron Storm (2002 video game), a first-person shooter developed by Wanadoo Edition
- Iron Storm (album)

== See also ==
- Ion Storm, an American video game developer
