= As the Earth Turns =

As the Earth Turns may refer to:

- As the Earth Turns, the 1933 debut novel by Gladys Hasty Carroll
- As the Earth Turns (1934 film), an adaptation of the Carroll novel
- As the Earth Turns (1938 film), an American science-fiction silent film directed by Richard Lyford

== See also ==
- As the World Turns (disambiguation)
