= Bananza =

Bananza may refer to:

- "Belly Dancer (Bananza)", a 2005 song by Akon from the album Trouble
- Donkey Kong Bananza, a 2025 platform game developed and published by Nintendo
  - Bananza, a form used by Donkey Kong in Donkey Kong Bananza

== See also ==
- Bonanza (disambiguation)
  - Bonanza, an American western television series (1959–1973)
