= Mikey Spice =

Musical artist (born 1965)

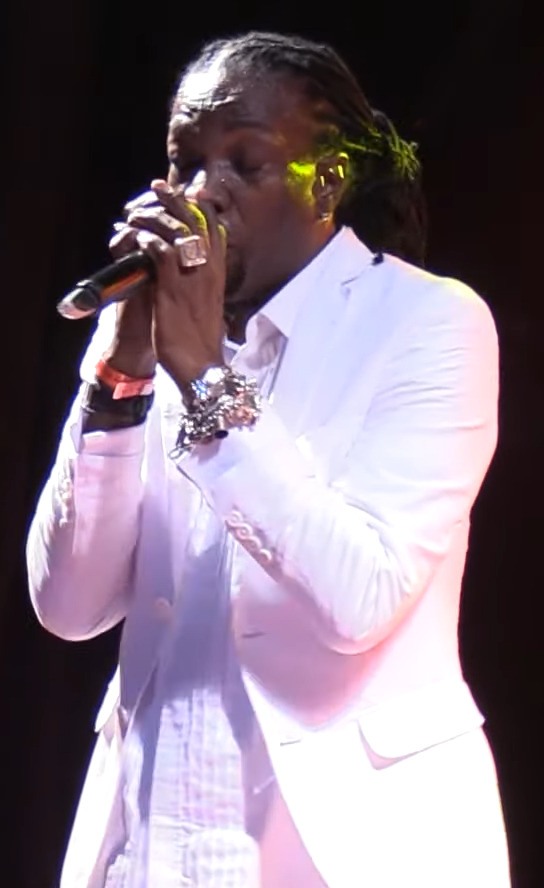
- Mikey Spice performing at Oracabessa Festival 2024

Background information
- Born: Michael Theophilus Johnson; 21 July 1965 (age 61); Kingston, Jamaica
- Genres: Reggae, Roots Reggae, Lovers Rock, R&B, Dubplate
- Instrument: Vocals

Michael Theophilus Johnson (born 21 July 1965), better known as Mikey Spice, is a Jamaican reggae singer. Mikey Spice has released conscious roots reggae, lovers rock, R&B and Dubplate with a number of artists and producers, amongst them Tony Rebel, Firehouse Crew, Marcia Griffiths, Saxon Studio International, Frankie Paul, Peckings Records, Hawkeye Records,Luciano (Jamaican singer), and many more.

== Biography ==
Spice sang in his father's church from age seven and learned to play guitar, bass, drums, trumpet, piano, saxophone, flute, and harp as a youngster. Spice began a career as a reggae musician in 1985. One of his best-known singles was a cover of Barry White's "Practice What You Preach".

== Discography ==
=== Singles & EPs ===
- Tony Rebel / Mikey Spice - Who You Are / Acting Like Strangers ((12") Roof International, 1992)
- Apache Scratchie / Mikey Spice - Me No Powder / You Caught Me ((12") Roof International, 1992
- You Make Me ((12") Big Ship, 1993)
- I'll Be There ((12") Juggling Records, 1994
- Mikey Spice & Luciano - Let's Work It Out ((12") Big Ship, 1994)
- Cheat On Me ((7") Black Scorpio, 1994)
- Never Say Goodbye ((12") Big Ship,1994)
- Practice What You Preach (RAS Records, 1995)
- When Your Lonely (Digital-B, 1995)
- Smokey Joe / Mikey Spice - Smokin Hornz ((12", MP) No Smoking Records, Big Ship,1995)
- Born Again (Digital-B, 1995)
- Brotherman ((12") Juggling Records, 1995)
- Twiggy & Mickey Spice - Let's Groove ((7") Digital-B, 1995)
- I Wanna Know ((7") Digital-B, 1995)
- Give It All Up ((7") Big Yard Music Group, 1995)
- Mikey Spice / Marcia Griffiths - If Only You Know (Penthouse Records, 1996)
- Shaggy / Mikey Spice - Shake Your Boody (Big Yard Music Group, 1996)
- Jah Never Fail I ((12") Saxon Records, 1996)
- Mikey Spice Featuring Shaggy / Red Fox / Private P / Big Yard Crew - Shake Your Boody / Wicked Alfred / Woman You Look Good ((12") Greensleeves Records, 1996)
- Frankie Paul / Mikey Spice - One Last Memory ((12") Digital Eclipse, 1996)
- Karen Smith, Mikey Spice, The Taxi Gang - Make It Easy, Easy Yourself ((7") Taxi, 1997)
- Give It Up ((7") Penthouse Records, 1998)
- Yes Mi Friend ("Duppy Conqueror") ((7") Big Ship, 2000)

=== Albums ===
- Happiness (Ras Records, 1995)
- Born Again (VP Records, 1996)
- Close the Door (LP on Charm Records, 1996, CD on Jet Star Records 1998)
- So Much Things To Say (Jet Star Records, 1996)
- All About You (Ras, 1996)
- Jah Lifted Me (VP, 1997)
- Reggae Max (Jet Star Records, 1997)
- Mikey Spice VS Garnet Silk : Toe 2 Toe (CD on Jet Star Records, 1998)
- Harder Than Before (VP, 2000)
- It's All About Time (Jet Star Records, Firehouse, 2000)
- Love By You (2 LP on Teflon Records, 2003)
- My Way (Charm Records, LP 2003, CD 2007)
- Mikey Spice (Artists Only! 2003)
- Walk A Mile (VP Records, 2008)
- Love By You (CD on Ajang Music Production, 2008)
- I Really Love You (Black Scorpio Records, 2012)
- I Am I Said (Joe Fraser Records, 2014)

=== Compilations ===
- Garnett Silk / Mikey Spice - Toe 2 Toe (LP on Charm Records, 1997)
- Spice Rack (Who Dun It Records, 1998)
