= Iron Storm (album) =

Studio album by Black Uhuru
- Released: 1991
- Studio: Leggo Sound Studio (Kingston, Jamaica)
- Genre: Reggae
- Length: 44:46
- Label: Mesa Recordings
- Producer: George Nauful (exec.); Jim Snowden (exec.); Black Uhuru

Black Uhuru chronology
Now (1990)	Iron Storm (1991)	Mystical Truth (1992)

Singles from Iron Storm
- 1. "Tip Of The Iceberg" Released: 1992

Professional ratings
Review scores
Source	Rating
Allmusic	2.5/5 stars

Iron Storm is a studio album by Jamaican reggae band Black Uhuru. It was released in 1991 through Mesa Recordings. The album peaked at number 1 on the US Billboard World Albums chart and was nominated for Grammy Award for Best Reggae Album at 34th Annual Grammy Awards.

== Track listing ==
No.	Title	Length
1.	"Tip of the Iceberg" (Remix)	4:30
2.	"Bloodshed"	3:59
3.	"Colourblind Affair"	4:49
4.	"Dance Hall Vibes"	4:17
5.	"Statement"	4:30
6.	"Tip of the Iceberg" (featuring Ice-T)	5:15
7.	"Iron Storm"	4:59
8.	"Breakout"	3:39
9.	"Trouble"	4:06
10.	"Colourblind Affair" (FM)	4:42
Total length:		44:46

== Personnel ==
- Derrick Simpson – lead vocals, composer, producer
- Ived "Sen-C" Campbell – backing vocals
- Tracy Lauren Marrow – guest rap vocals (tracks: 1, 6)
- Leebert "Gibby" Morrison – rhythm guitar
- Steven "Cat" Coore – guitar
- Christopher Meridith – bass
- Derrick Sagittarius Barnet – bass
- Earl "Bagga" Walker – bass
- Anthony Brissett – keyboards, piano
- Noel Davis – keyboards, piano
- David Madden – horns
- Dean Fraser – horns
- Egbert Evans – horns
- Marcus "Rangatan" Smith – drums
- Lowell Fillmore Dunbar – drums
- Christopher "Sky Juice" Blake – percussion
- Don Carlos – producer
- Donny Nguyen – producer
- Garth Dennis – producer
- Michael Angelo Saulsberry – producer
- George Nauful – executive producer
- Jim Snowden – executive producer
- Claire McNally – production assistant
- Jim York – production assistant
- Steve Sykes – mixing
- David Rowe – engineering
- Lynford "Fatta" Marshall – engineering
- Rohan Richards – engineering
- Rudi Ekstein – engineering
- Mark Johnson – assistant engineering
- Howard Alston – coordinator
- Kathleen Covert – art direction & design
- Nancy Nimoy – artwork
- Johnny Black – photography

== Charts ==
Chart (1991)	Peak position
US World Albums (Billboard)	1
