= Dance Wicked =

Studio album by Michael Rose
- Released: June 10, 1997
- Genre: Reggae
- Label: Heartbeat Records
- Producer: Mafia & Fluxy

Michael Rose chronology
| Michael Rose (1995) | Dance Wicked (1997) | Dub Wicked (1997) |

Professional ratings
Review scores
| Source | Rating |
|---|---|
| AllMusic | 4.5/5 stars |
| Boston Herald | 3.5/4 stars |

Dance Wicked is an album by the reggae musician Michael Rose, released in 1997 by Heartbeat Records. A dub version of the album, Dub Wicked, was released at the same time.

== Production ==
The album was recorded in England, and was produced by David "Fluxy" Heywood and Leroy "Mafia" Heywood a.k.a. Mafia & Fluxy. Maxi Priest contributed vocals to "Lion in the Jungle".

== Critical reception ==
The Boston Globe thought that "Rose, who has one of the most copied vocal styles in reggae, acquits himself well with both love songs and social commentary." The Chicago Tribune called the album "a fetching swirl of old and new reggae styles charged with Rose's soulful crooning and topical lyrics." The Boston Herald deemed it "a near-masterpiece" and "a blast of roots rhythm and attitude that remains undiluted by the sleek, up-to-the-minute production of Mafia and Fluxy." The Times-Picayune wrote that Dance Wicked is "a marriage of old and new, in which contemporary, hip-hop-influenced programmed beats and rhythms are overlaid with Rose's roots reggae vocal delivery."

AllMusic wrote that "Dance Wicked is a stellar set, a sumptuous aural banquet that may start in the past, but moves the party quickly into the present and well into the wee hours, as Rose's words and the diverse music really begin to hit home."

== Track listing ==
1. Happiness
2. Dance Wicked
3. Lion in the Jungle (featuring Maxi Priest)
4. Run Dem a Run
5. Dreadlocks
6. Reality
7. Landlord
8. See and Blind
9. I Don't Want to Say Goodbye
10. Mind Made Up
11. Never Get Me Down
12. Life in the Ghetto
13. Mind Made Up - (Soul Up Mix)
14. Mind Made Up - (Soul Up Instrumental instrumental)
