= Di Captain =

Studio album by Freddie McGregor
- Released: January 29, 2013
- Genre: Reggae
- Label: VP Records

Di Captain is a studio album by Freddie McGregor, released on January, 29 in 2013, under VP Records. The album consists of 16 songs, showcasing McGregor's talent for re-interpretation with a selection of cover songs including a remake of his own 1980 hit "Africa (Here I Come)". Other features include "Move Up Jamaica" a spirited tribute for Jamaica's 50th anniversary of independence.

== Track listing ==
No.	Title	Artist	Writer(s)
1	(Intro) "Jenny Jenny"	Freddie McGregor	
2	"Move Up Jamaica"	Freddie McGregor	F. McGregor / C. McLeod / L. Martin
3	"You Won't See Me"	Freddie McGregor	John Lennon, Paul McCartney
4	"Bag a Hype"	Freddie McGregor	F. McGregor / C. McLeod
5	"Africa"	Freddie McGregor	F. Simpson / L. Ferguson / D. Shaw / J. Hoo-Kim
6	"More Love in the Ghetto"	Freddie McGregor	F. McGregor / C. Dodd
7	"Love I Believe In"	Freddie McGregor	F. McGregor / C&R McLeod
8	"Rainbow Country"	Freddie McGregor	Marcus Miller, Luther R. Vandross
9	"Standing Strong" featuring Gappy Ranks	Freddie McGregor	F. McGregor / J. Williams / C. Dodd
10	"Love Ballad"	Freddie McGregor	Skip Scarborough
11	"There You Go"	Freddie McGregor	F. McGregor / C&R McLeod
12	"My Story"	Freddie McGregor	F. McGregor / D. Browne / S. McGregor
13	"Let It Be Me" featuring Etana	Freddie McGregor	Gilbert Bécaud, Pierre Delanoë, Mann Curtis
14	"Jah Love Di Whole A Wi"	Freddie McGregor	F. McGregor / D. Browne / C. Dodd
15	"House Is Not a Home"	Freddie McGregor	Burt Bacharach, Hal David
16	"Equal Rights"	Freddie McGregor	Leroy Sibbles

== Executive producers ==
- Freddie McGregor
- C. & R. McLeod
