= Yasus Afari =

Jamaican dub poet

- Born: John Sinclair; 1962 (age 63–64); Saint Elizabeth Parish, Jamaica
- Occupations: Writer, dub poet
- Writing career
- Genre: Dub poetry
- Literary movement: Rastafari movement
- Website: www.yasusafari.com

Yasus Afari (born John Sinclair, 1962) is a Jamaican dub poet.

== Biography ==
Born in, Saint Elizabeth Parish, Jamaica, Sinclair was a childhood friend of Garnett Silk and collaborated with Silk on many of his best-selling recordings. Sinclair attended St. Elizabeth Technical High School, and worked as a repair technician for the Jamaican telephone company, before returning to school after receiving a scholarship to the College of Arts, Science and Technology. He became politically active while at the college, and was elected vice-president of the student council, although he declined the position.

While at the college, he began performing, appearing regularly at venues such as the University of the West Indies (UWI), a nursing school and a teachers college. His initial forays into recording were not commercially successful (his first release was "Anti-Litter Law" in 1986) but his career began to turn around after he teamed with Silk. His first combination release with Silk was a version of Johnny Nash's "I Can See Clearly Now".

Afari's style has been compared to that of Mutabaruka. As well as performing more traditional poetry readings, he also performs his poetry live over dancehall music. Although Afari rejects the slack lyrics that are common in dancehall, he believes that the genre can be used to get his message across:

"You have to link with the dancehall; you haffi recognize seh the human element is very important. Humans gather at the dancehall in their hundreds and thousands; you can't ignore that as a social activist. You have to find ways and means, creatively, to communicate without prostituting whatever you stand for, to address the dancehall reality".

Afari toured throughout the United States and the Pacific Islands with Black Uhuru in the mid-1990s. In 1996, with Mutabaruka, Tony Rebel, and Uton Green, Afari toured Ethiopia. In 2006, he co-headlined the Cayman Music Festival, along with Freddie McGregor and Maxi Priest. In 2007, he toured England, performing at prisons, mental institutions, book shops and schools, as well as acting as poet in residence at the University of Birmingham, where his book Overstanding Rastafari was launched in the UK. Overstanding Rastafari was the result of five years work for Afari, and was described by Professor Barry Chevannes of the UWI as "a work by a Rastafarian scholar who is interpreting for the non-Rastafarian audience his perspective. Not idiosyncratically his own, but the view of the movement on where Jamaica and the world are positioned at this time".

Afari's latest album is Public Secret, recorded with his band Dub Vijan, and released in 2013.

Afari has also recorded as a background vocalist and dub poet for Everton Blender, General Degree and Tony Rebel.

Afari is head of Edutainment Promotion, organisers (with the Jamaica Cultural Development Commission) of the Jamaican Poetry Festival.

== Discography ==
- Dancehall Baptism (1993), RAS
- Mental Assassin (1995)
- Honour Crown Him (1997), Sen Ya Cum
- Gift of Vijjahn (2000), House of Honour
- Revolution Chapter 1 (2007)
- Ancient Future (2012), Senya-Cum Records
- Public Secret (2013), Fox Fuse

== Books ==
- Eye Pen
- Overstanding Rastafari: Jamaica's Gift to the World (2007)
- Vocal Ink: The Mental Intercourse (2016)
