= Bonanza (Michael Rose album) =

Studio album by Michael Rose
- Released: October 12, 1999
- Genre: Reggae
- Label: Heartbeat Records
- Producers: Chris Wilson, Michael Rose

Michael Rose chronology
Party in Session: Live (1998)	Bonanza (1999)	Never Give It Up (2001)

Professional ratings
Review scores
Source	Rating
AllMusic	4.5/5 stars

Bonanza is a studio album by Jamaican reggae singer Michael Rose, released in 1999 via Heartbeat Records.

== Critical reception ==
Dave Thompson, in Reggae & Caribbean Music, called Bonanza "Rose's most diverse album to date, and his hardest hitting." AllMusic called it "a fabulous album for any mood or occasion." CMJ New Music Report wrote that Rose "presents his classic take on modern reggae, incorporating hints of American R&B and hardcore dancehall into his straight-ahead reggae style."

== Track listing ==
1. "Ganja Bonanza"
2. "Someone Is Watching"
3. "Youths Of The Ghetto"
4. "It's Alright"
5. "Whoo-La"
6. "Give A Little"
7. "Chatto"
8. "Jah Jah Never Fail I"
9. "We All Need Love"
10. "Rock With Somebody"
11. "Christian Soldiers"
12. "Revolution"
13. "Brown Eyes"
14. "Bogus Badge"
