= Now (Black Uhuru album) =

Studio album by Black Uhuru
- Released: 1990
- Studio: The Mixing Lab (Kingston, Jamaica); Channel One (Kingston, Jamaica)
- Genre: Reggae
- Length: 44:28
- Label: Mesa Recordings; Rhino Records
- Producer: Terry Rindal (exec.); Black Uhuru (also exec.); Tony "Asha" Brissett

Black Uhuru chronology
Live In New York City (1988)	Now (1990)	Iron Storm (1991)

Singles from Now
- 1. "Reggae Rock" Released: 1990; 2. "Take Head" Released: 1990; 3. "Now" Released: 1990

Professional ratings
Review scores
Source	Rating
AllMusic	3/5 stars

Now is a studio album by the Jamaican reggae band Black Uhuru. It was released in 1990 through Rhino Records. The album peaked at number 121 on the US Billboard 200 chart, number 2 on the World Albums chart, and was nominated for Grammy Award for Best Reggae Recording at 33rd Annual Grammy Awards.

== Track listing ==
No.	Title	Length
1.	"Heathen"	3:37
2.	"Peace and Love"	4:00
3.	"Army Band"	4:20
4.	"Take Heed"	5:01
5.	"Reggae Rock"	4:27
6.	"Thinking About You"	4:51
7.	"Imposter"	5:08
8.	"Freedom Fighter"	3:55
9.	"Word Sound"	3:58
10.	"Hey Joe"	5:10
Total length:		44:28

Notes

- Track 10 is a cover of "Hey Joe", written by Billy Roberts and performed by Jimi Hendrix.

== Personnel ==
- Derrick Simpson – lead vocals, composer
- Ived "Sen-C" Campbell – backing vocals
- Frank Stepanek – lead guitar
- Leebert "Gibby" Morrison – bass (tracks: 1–4, 7–9)
- Christopher Meridith – bass (tracks: 5, 10)
- Wrong Devon – bass (track 6)
- Noel Davis – piano
- Marcus "Rangatan" Smith – drums (tracks: 1–4, 7–9)
- Anthony Brissett – piano, keyboards, drums (tracks: 5, 10), producer
- Sydney Wolfe – percussion
- Christopher "Sky Juice" Burth – percussion
- Terry Rindal – executive producer, producer
- Steven J. C. Stanley – engineering
- David Rowe – engineering
- Antoine Salassie – engineering
- Collin "Bulby" York – assistant engineering
- Lynford "Fatta" Marshall – assistant engineering
- George Nauful – coordinator
- Kathleen Cascone – art direction & design
- Benjamin Groeper – photography
- Conley Major – photography

== Charts ==
Chart (1990)	Peak position
US Billboard 200	121
US World Albums (Billboard)	2
