= Chill Out (Black Uhuru album) =

Studio album by Black Uhuru
- Released: December 1982
- Genre: Reggae
- Length: 35:44
- Label: Mango
- Producer: Sly Dunbar, Robbie Shakespeare

Black Uhuru chronology
Red (1981)	Chill Out (1982)	Guess Who's Coming to Dinner (1983)

Audio sample
- 30 seconds of "Chill Out": file; help

Professional ratings
Review scores
Source	Rating
AllMusic	4.5/5 stars
Christgau's Record Guide	B+
Tom Hull – on the Web	B+

Chill Out is an album by reggae band Black Uhuru, released in 1982. The album was recorded at Channel One Studios in Jamaica and produced by Sly and Robbie. Featuring The Revolutionaries, an influential session group, Chill Out, together with its dub companion The Dub Factor, is widely considered a classic of reggae music.

== Reception ==
Chill Out peaked at #146 on the Billboard chart.

Reviewing the album for AllMusic, Jo-Ann Greene said:

Arguably the best of Black Uhuru's electrofied albums, even if its predecessor Red was the bigger sell, Chill Out is a seminal blend of styles and cultures... The sound is extremely dense, but the producers still found plenty of space for Black Uhuru's sublime vocals. Over, under, and around the band, the electronic effects whoosh, pulling the album from its island roots, and planting it firmly in an international environment. This is most notable on the title track, which blends rootsy rhythms with a dance beat, and urban stylings with a tinge of world music... On Chill Out, the vocalists, band, and producers came together as one, and created more than a masterpiece; the album remains a stunning legacy for all involved.

== Track listing ==
All tracks are written by Michael Rose, except where noted:

No.	Title	Writer(s)	Length
1.	"Chill Out"	Michael Rose, Sly Dunbar, Robbie Shakespeare, Derrick "Duckie" Simpson	5:58
2.	"Darkness"		4:00
3.	"Eye Market"		3:16
4.	"Right Stuff"		4:34
5.	"Mondays"		3:20
6.	"Fleety Foot"		4:00
7.	"Wicked Act"		3:26
8.	"Moya (Queen of I Jungle)"	Simpson	3:29
9.	"Emotional Slaughter"	Simpson	3:41

== Personnel ==
- Michael Rose – vocals
- Derrick "Duckie" Simpson – harmony vocals
- Puma Jones – harmony vocals

=== Musicians ===
- Wally Badarou – synthesizer, vocoder
- Barry Reynolds – guitar on "Wicked Act"
- Ansel Collins – piano, keyboards
- Radcliff "Dougie" Bryan – guitar
- Mikey Chung – guitar
- Sly Dunbar – drums, syndrums, arranger, producer, mixer
- Chris "Sky Juice" Burth – percussion
- Robert Lyn – piano
- Bertram "Ranchie" McLean – rhythm guitar, organ
- Robbie Shakespeare – bass guitar, arranger, producer, mixer
- Uziah "Sticky" Thompson – percussion

=== Technical ===
- Sly Dunbar – arranger, producer, mixer
- Robbie Shakespeare – arranger, producer, mixer
- Bruce Hamilton – engineer
- Steven Stanley – engineer, mixer
- Neville Garrick – design
- Lynn Goldsmith – photography
