= Big Ship (Freddie McGregor album) =

Studio album by Freddie McGregor
- Released: 1982
- Studio: Harry J's, Kingston, Jamaica; Channel One, Kingston, Jamaica
- Genre: Reggae
- Label: Greensleeves GREL39
- Producer: Linval Thompson

Freddie McGregor chronology
I Am Ready (1982)	Big Ship (1982)	Rhythm So Nice (1983)

Big Ship is a studio album by the Jamaican musician Freddie McGregor. It was released via Greensleeves Records in 1982. McGregor named his studio after the album. The title track was McGregor's first major hit.

The album was produced by Linval Thompson. The backing band was the Roots Radics. It was mixed by Scientist.

== Critical reception ==
Professional ratings
Review scores
Source	Rating
AllMusic	4/5 stars

AllMusic wrote that "McGregor's love of African-American soul music comes through loud and clear—even though many of the more Rastafarian-oriented lyrics are very much a product of the Jamaican experience."

== Track listing ==
1. "Big Ship" - 3:18
2. "Sweet Lady" - 3:11
3. "Peaceful Man" - 3:45
4. "Stop Loving You" - 3:09
5. "Get Serious" - 3:06
6. "Don't Play the Fool" - 3:15
7. "Get United" - 3:21
8. "Let Me Be the One" - 3:27
9. "Roots Man Skanking" - 3:19
10. "Holy Mount Zion" - 3:13
