= Positive (Black Uhuru album) =

Studio album by Black Uhuru
- Released: 1987
- Genre: Reggae
- Label: RAS
- Producer: Steven Stanley

Black Uhuru chronology
Brutal Dub (1986)	Positive (1987)	Positive Dub (1987)

Positive is a studio album by the Jamaican reggae group Black Uhuru, released in 1987. A dub album, Positive Dub, was released the same year. Positive was the final album with vocalist Delroy "Junior" Reid.

== Production ==
The album was produced by Steven Stanley. Sly and Robbie, who had produced Black Uhuru on earlier albums, appear as backing musicians. Puma Jones left the band before production began, and was replaced by Olafunke; Jones is still credited on the album.

== Critical reception ==
Professional ratings
Review scores
Source	Rating
AllMusic	2/5 stars
Robert Christgau	A−
The Encyclopedia of Popular Music	3/5 stars
The Rolling Stone Album Guide	3/5 stars

Robert Christgau wrote that "Sly and Robbie won't knock you out, but on Uhuru's best records they never do—given the right songs and performances, all they have to do is make them righter." Trouser Press thought that the album "finds [Delroy] Reid coming into his own as a vocalist, and features a few songs that are strikingly original." The Ottawa Citizen called the album "uplifting, yet realistic," writing that it "paints real, and often graphic, pictures of conflict in the Third World." The St. Petersburg Times wrote that "at its best, Black Uhuru combines the persistent dance-inciting rhythms of pure reggae with substantial pop melodies and soulful vocals." The Washington Post opined that "occasionally missing ... is the sheer tunefulness the band has displayed in the past."

== Track listing ==
No.	Title	Length
1.	"Cowboy Town"	3:51
2.	"Fire City"	4:06
3.	"Positive"	4:05
4.	"Concept"	3:34
5.	"Space Within Your Heart"	4:46
6.	"Dry Weather House"	3:56
7.	"Pain"	4:18
8.	"I Create"	4:08

== Personnel ==
- Derrick "Duckie" Simpson – vocals
- Delroy "Junior" Reid – vocals
- Olafunke – vocals
- Sly Dunbar – drums
- Robbie Shakespeare – bass
- Asher – keyboards
- Chinna Smith – guitar
- Rass Brass – horns
