= Chilling effect (disambiguation) =

A chilling effect, in a legal context, is the inhibition or discouragement of the legitimate exercise of natural and legal rights by the threat of legal sanction.

Chilling effect or Chilling Effects may also refer to:

- Chilling Effects, former name of Lumen, a collaboration between several law school clinics and the Electronic Frontier Foundation to protect lawful online activity from legal threats
- Wind chill, the apparent temperature felt on exposed skin, which is a function of the air temperature and wind speed
