= Freddie McGregor =

Jamaican singer, musician and record producer

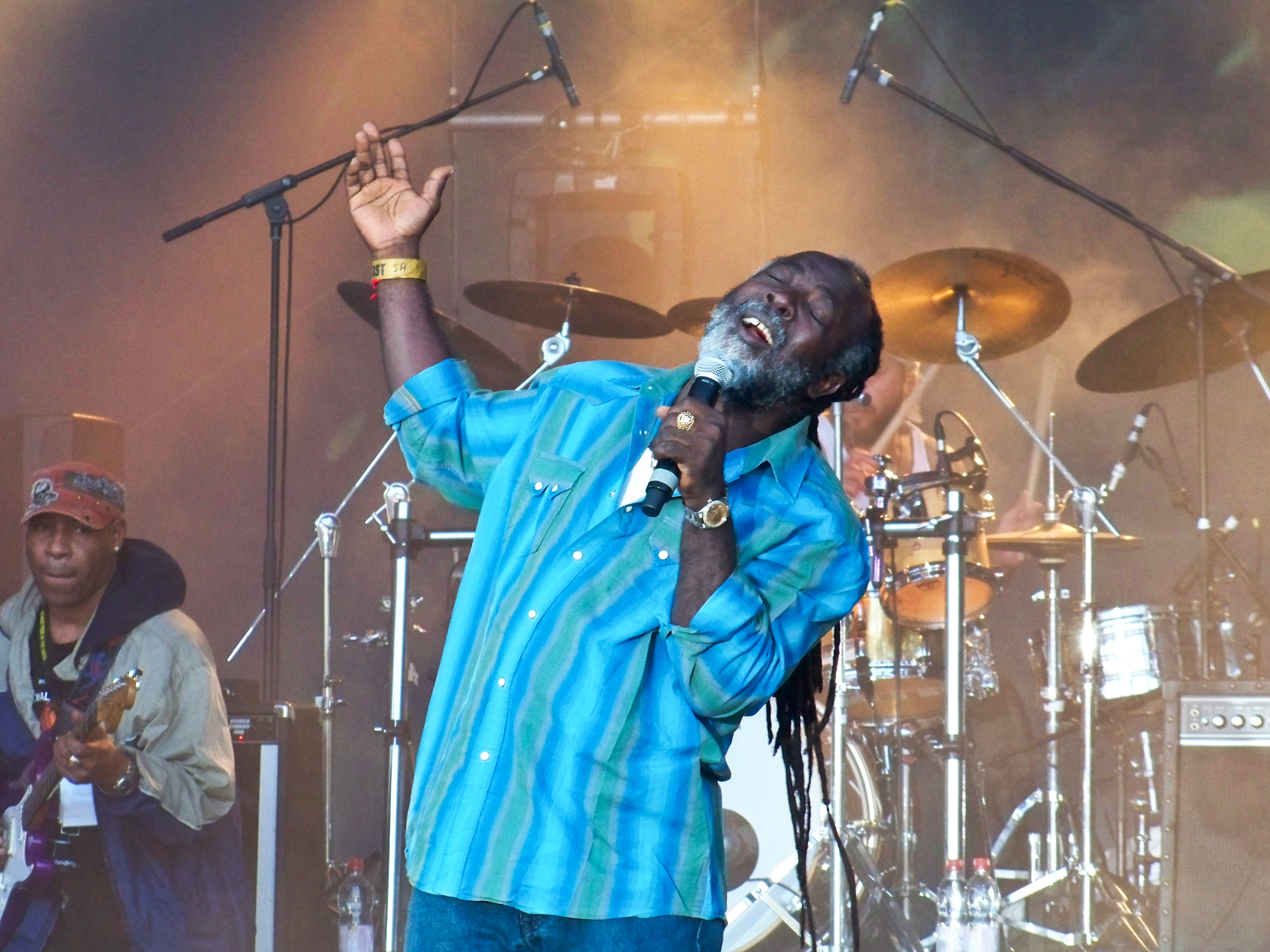

Background information
- Also known as: Little Freddie
- Born: 27 June 1956 (age 70); Clarendon, Jamaica
- Genres: Reggae, lovers rock, ska, rocksteady, roots reggae
- Occupations: Singer, record producer, drummer
- Years active: 1963–present
- Labels: VP, Greensleeves, Studio One, Polydor, RAS, various
- Formerly of: The Clarendonians, Generation Gap
- Children: 3 sons, inc. Stephen "Di Genius" McGregor (son)

Fredrick "Freddie" McGregor (born 27 June 1956, in Clarendon, Jamaica) is a Jamaican singer, musician and record producer. His music career began when he was seven years old.

== Biography ==
In 1963, he joined with Ernest Wilson and Peter Austin to form The Clarendonians, and began to record for the Studio One label. He was only seven years old at the time and was known as "Little Freddie". He was also a member of the Generation Gap.

McGregor converted to Rastafari in 1975. He is a member of the Twelve Tribes organization.

McGregor worked with producer Niney the Observer during the late 1970s and early 1980s, and in the same period was part of the resurgence of Studio One. His popularity soared in the early 1980s with the release of "Bobby Babylon". Other popular hits of McGregor's include "Big Ship", "Push Comes to Shove", "Just Don't Want to Be Lonely" (a top ten hit in the UK), and "I Was Born a Winner"; as well as cover versions of many early reggae standards. He has also worked with producers Junjo Lawes, Linval Thompson, and Gussie Clarke. McGregor has also recorded as a drummer with artists such as Sugar Minott and Judy Mowatt.

McGregor has also toured extensively for many years. He secured a licensing agreement with RAS Records in US and released Come on Over in 1983.

McGregor's albums in the 2000s were Signature and Anything for You, which received a Grammy nomination.

He established the Big Ship label in 1983, and has produced many artists including Papa San, Lieutenant Stitchie, Tiger, Luciano and Mikey Spice.

In a 2011 interview, McGregor expressed concern that many veteran artists, including himself, struggled for local radio play of their newer material, which he felt might be "lost" over time as a result.

His album Di Captain, released in August 2012, featured Etana and Gappy Ranks.

In 2013, McGregor received a Marcus Garvey Lifetime Achievement Award from the Institute of Caribbean Studies.

One of McGregor's three sons, Stephen "Di Genius" McGregor, is a dancehall record producer. More recently, he had signed a deal with Warner Chappell Music.

== Discography ==
=== Albums ===
- Bobby Bobylon (1979), Studio One
- Mr. McGregor aka Freddie McGregor (1979), Observer/Jackal/56 Hope Rd/Mercury
- Lovers Rock (Showcase Jamaica Style) (1981), Live & Love
- Roots Man Skanking (1982) Clocktower
- I Am Ready (1982), Coxsone/Studio One
- Love at First Sight (1982), Intense
- Big Ship (1982)
- Come on Over (1983), RAS
- Rhythm So Nice (1983), Thompson Sounds
- Across the Border (1984), RAS
- All in the Same Boat (1986), RAS
- Freddie McGregor (1987), Polydor
- Don't Want to Be Lonely Studio One
- Live at the Town & Country Club (1991), VP
- FM (1992), High Times
- Live in London 1991 (1993), Charly
- Sing Jamaican Classics Vol.1
- Masterpiece (1997), VP
- Jamaican Classics Vol.2 (1998), Big Ship
- Magic in the Air (1999), Big Ship
- Zion Chant (1999), Heartbeat
- Signature (2000), VP
- Rumours (2000), Greensleeves
- Carry Go Bring Come (2000), Greensleeves
- Hard to Get (2000), Greensleeves
- Forever My Love (2000), RAS
- Push On (2002), Big Ship
- Lovers Rock (2003), Prestige
- Anything for You (2002), VP
- Reggae Max (2003), Jet Star
- Heart Is Willing (2003), Charm
- Rhythms of My Heart (2004), Nuff
- Comin' in Tough (2005), VP
- Mister Eudaric Riddim (2009)
- Mr.McGregor (2009), VP
- Giants (2009), Joe Gibbs Publishing
- Di Captain (2013), VP
- True to My Roots (2016), Big Ship/VP

=== UK hit singles ===
The following were hits on the UK Singles Chart:

Year	Song	UK
1986	"Push Comes to Shove"	89
1987	"Just Don't Want to Be Lonely"	9
1987	"That Girl (Groovy Situation)"	47
1988	"Come to Me"	91

== DVDs and videos ==
=== Freddie McGregor releases ===
- Live Video Music, Inc. (DVD)

=== Various artists releases featuring McGregor ===
- A Reggae Christmas (1988) RAS
- Sunsplash '90 – Reggae Rockers (1990) Wienerworld (DVD)
- The Reggae Movie (1996) Geneon (DVD)
- Golden Voices of Reggae (2005) Island MVD (DVD)
- Western Consciousness Pt 2 (2005) Island MVD (DVD)
- iDrop Riddim (aka Rootstime Riddim) (2013) Rootstime production / Asani Ali music

== See also ==
- List of reggae musicians
- List of roots reggae artists
- List of performers on Top of the Pops
- VP Records
- Rastafari movement
