= Mystical Truth =

Studio album by Black Uhuru
- Released: 1993
- Studio: Leggo (Kingston, Jamaica); Mixing Lab (Kingston, Jamaica); Our Own Studio (Los Angeles, California)
- Genre: Reggae
- Length: 54:24
- Label: Mesa
- Producer: Black Uhuru

Black Uhuru chronology
Iron Storm (1991)	Mystical Truth (1993)	Strongg (1994)

Professional ratings
Review scores
Source	Rating
AllMusic	4/5 stars

Mystical Truth is a studio album by the Jamaican reggae band Black Uhuru. It was released in 1993 through Mesa Recordings. The album peaked at number 6 on the US Billboard World Albums chart and was nominated for Grammy Award for Best Reggae Album at 36th Annual Grammy Awards.

== Track listing ==
No.	Title	Writer(s)	Length
1.	"Questions"		5:02
2.	"Bassline"		3:47
3.	"Slippin' into Darkness"	Sylvester Allen; Harold Ray Brown; Morris Dickerson; LeRoy L. Jordan; Charles Miller; Lee Oskar; Howard E. Scott	5:40
4.	"Give My Love"		4:34
5.	"Don't You Worry"		4:39
6.	"Dreadlock Pall Bearers"		3:46
7.	"One Love" (featuring Louie Rankin)		6:30
8.	"Payday"		3:53
9.	"Ozone Layer"		3:43
10.	"Living in the City"		4:02
11.	"Young School Girl"		4:03
12.	"Mercy Street"		4:45
Total length:			54:24

== Personnel ==
- Derrick Simpson – vocals, composer, producer
- Ived "Sen-C" Campbell – backing vocals
- Lisa Hewitt – backing vocals
- Vann Johnson – backing vocals
- Zac Harmon – backing vocals, guitar, bass, drums, producer
- Louie Rankin – guest artist (track 7)
- Bob Brockman – guitar, bass, piano, synthesizer, strings, drums, congas, percussion, timbales, drum programming, producer, mixing
- Earl "Chinna" Smith – guitar
- Anthony Brissett – bass, piano, synthesizer, percussion, arranger
- Christopher Meridith – bass
- Earl "Bagga" Walker – bass
- Christopher Troy – piano, keyboards, drums, producer, arranger
- Noel Davis – piano, synthesizer
- Chico Chin – horns
- David Madden – horns
- Dean Fraser – horns
- Nambo Robinson – horns
- Rass Brass – horns
- Marcus "Rangatan" Smith – drums & percussion
- George "Dusty" Miller – drums & percussion
- Lowell Fillmore Dunbar – drums
- Jermaine Forde – drums
- Harry T. Powell – percussion
- George Nauful – executive producer
- Jim Snowden – executive producer
- Claire McNally – production coordinator
- Steve Sykes – mixing
- David Rowe – engineering
- Lynford "Fatta" Marshall – engineering
- Rohan Richards – engineering
- Karl Tappin – engineering
- Rob Groome – assistant engineering
- Vincent Henry – assistant engineering
- Mark Johnson – assistant engineering
- Steve Hall – mastering
- Howard Alston – horns, flute, saxophone
- Michelle Laurencot – art direction & design
- Ron Larson – art direction
- Nathaniel Welch – photography

== Charts ==
Chart (1993)	Peak position
US World Albums (Billboard)	6
