= The Wailing Souls =

Jamaican reggae group

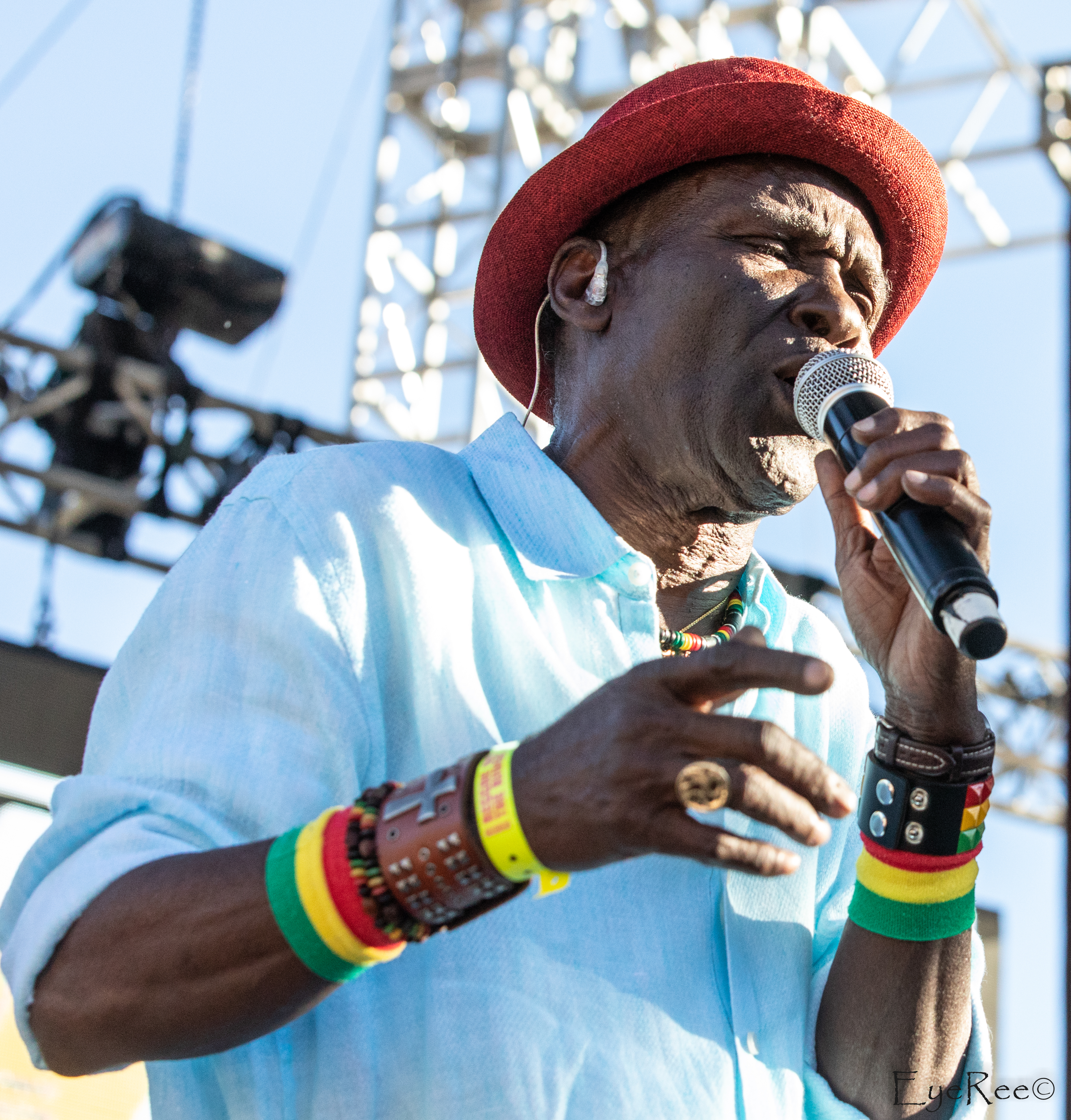
- Pipe performing in 2025

Background information
- Also known as: The Renegades; The Little Roys; The Classics; Atarra; Pipe and the Pipers
- Origin: Kingston, Jamaica
- Genres: Rocksteady, roots reggae
- Years active: 1968–present
- Labels: Studio One; Island; Channel One; Massive; Greensleeves; Live & Learn; Chaos; Zoo
- Members: Winston "Pipe" Matthews; Lloyd "Bread" McDonald
- Past members: George "Buddy" Haye; Oswald Downer; Norman Davis; Joe Higgs; Rudolph "Garth" Dennis; Ziggy Thomas; Maisha
- Website: wailingsouls.com

The Wailing Souls (originally The Renegades) are a conscious roots reggae vocal harmony group from Jamaica whose origins date back to the 1960s. The group has undergone several line-up changes over the years with Winston "Pipe" Matthews and Lloyd "Bread" McDonald the only constant members. They have been nominated for Grammy Awards three times.

== History ==
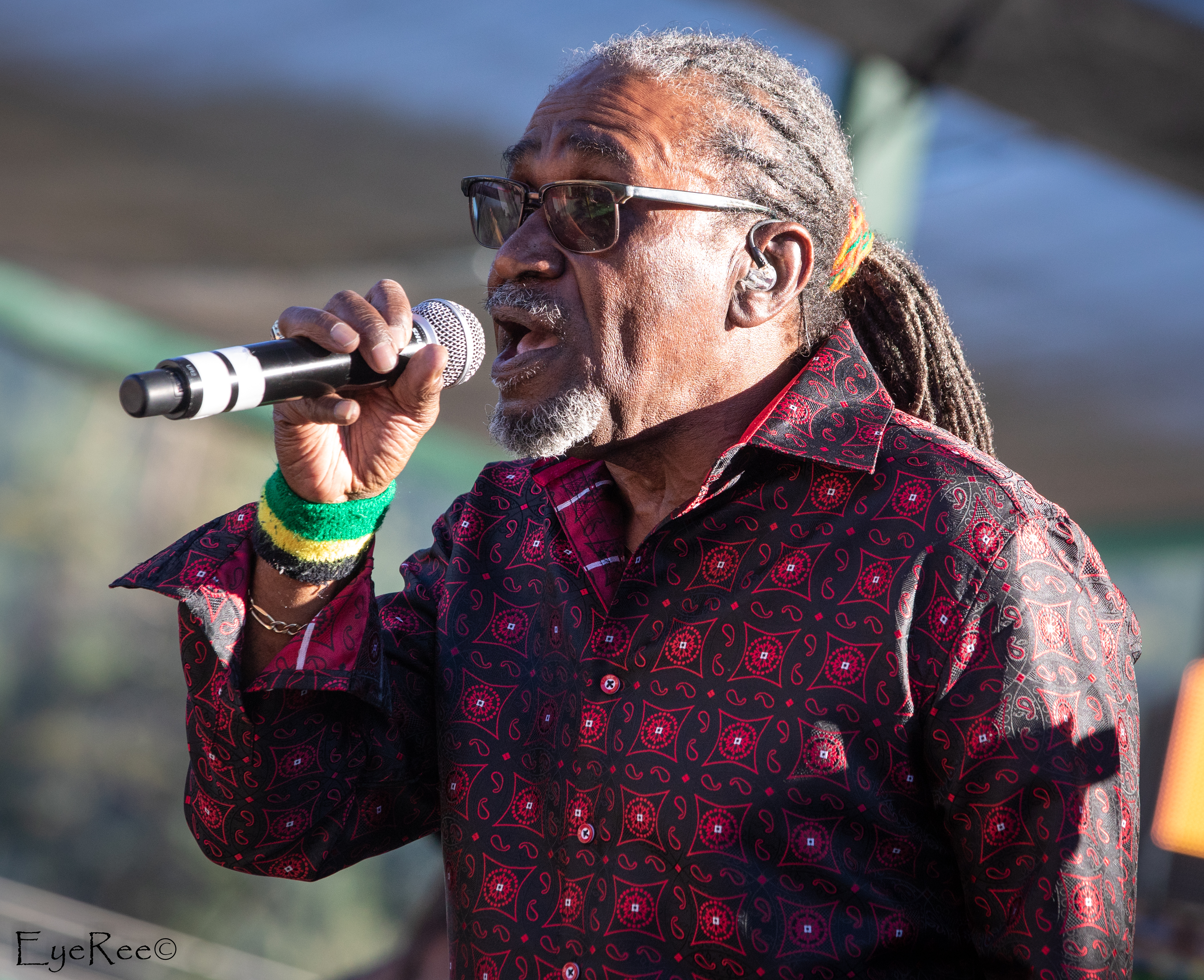

=== Formation and Studio One era ===
The group was originally formed as The Renegades in 1966, comprising Winston "Pipe" Matthews, Lloyd "Bread" McDonald, and George "Buddy" Haye, who had attended the same vocal classes held by Joe Higgs in the early 1960s as The Wailers. Matthews had previously recorded as a member of The Schoolboys for Prince Buster.

They recorded as backing singers with Ernest Ranglin and released their own debut single, "Lost Love", before recording several singles for Clement "Coxsone" Dodd's Studio One label, including "Back Out With It", "Row Fisherman Row", and "Mr. Fire Coal Man". The group became The Wailing Souls in 1968 and in the same year Haye left and new members Oswald Downer and Norman Davis joined. Under the new name they recorded singles such as "Dungeon" and "Thou Shalt Not Steal".

=== 1970s ===
In 1970 the group began working with producer Lloyd Daley, releasing the "Gold Digger" single. In this period, their singles were often released under names such as The Little Roys, The Classics, Atarra, and Pipe and the Pipers, to avoid confusion with The Wailers. They went on to record with members of the Wailers later that year on the Tuff Gong singles "Harbour Shark", "Walk Walk Walk", and "You Should've Known Better".

By 1974 Downer and Davis had left, and original member Buddy Haye returned, along with Joe Higgs, although Higgs' tenure in the band was short-lived as he was recruited for a US tour with Jimmy Cliff. His replacement was Rudolph "Garth" Dennis, a founder member of Black Uhuru.

In the mid-1970s, The Wailing Souls association with producer Joseph Hoo Kim and his Channel One Studios brought them a string of social consciousness hits, backed by house band The Revolutionaries, including "Back Biter", "Very Well", "Things and Time", "Jah Jah Give Us Life", and "War". In 1977 the band started their own 'Massive' label, further hits following in "Bredda Gravalicious" and "Feel the Spirit". The band's success reached another level in 1978 when their Wild Suspense album, featuring remixed tracks from their singles, was released internationally by Island Records.

=== 1980s ===
In the early 1980s they recorded with Sly and Robbie for the duo's Taxi label and continued to record at Channel One for producer Henry "Junjo" Lawes, singles from this era including "Fire House Rock", which was the title track from their 1980 album, released by Greensleeves Records. In the same era they also worked with other producers such as Linval Thompson (Wailing). From 1981 to 1984 they were largely based in the United States, and on their return to Jamaica, Haye stayed behind as did Dennis, until he returned to Jamaica and Black Uhuru in 1985.

Remaining members Matthews and McDonald launched a new era of the group in 1986 with singer Ziggy Thomas added to the line-up, working with producer Delroy Wright and going on to release the albums Lay It on the Line (1986) and Kingston 14 (1987), and recording Reggae in a Firehouse in 1988, although it was not released until 1991. They moved on to work with King Jammy on the 1989 album Stormy Night which was successful enough in the US to prompt the group to return there in 1991.

=== Major label era and later work ===
After moving to the US they added new member Maisha and signed to Sony's Chaos label. Their first major label album, All Over the World (1992) received a Grammy nomination the following year, and they became the first reggae group to appear on The Tonight Show. Four tracks from the album were used on the soundtrack of the film Cool Runnings. A second album for Sony, Live On (1994), this time released on the Zoo label, failed to repeat the success of its predecessor, and the group were dropped.

They continued to record, releasing the Tension album in 1997, and the covers album Psychedelic Souls in 1998, which was recorded with members of Sublime and the Long Beach Dub Allstars, and brought the group a second Grammy nomination. The self-produced Equality followed in 2000, which featured reworkings of old songs recorded with Sly and Robbie, and saw the band receive their third Grammy nomination. They also contributed the song "Renegade Survivor" to the soundtrack of the animated motion picture Titan A.E. in 2000.

In 2006 they released Classic Jamaican Flava, a two disc set featuring a compact disc and a DVD of a live performance in San Francisco, California. In 2008 Dennis returned to the group. Their track "Things and Time" was included in the soundtrack of the 2010 film Dear John.

In April 2015 it was reported that McDonald and Matthews were working on a new album with Sly and Robbie. The group released the album Island Girl in 2017.

The group have recorded cover versions of a wide variety of songs, such as Kate and Anna McGarrigle's "Heartbeats Accelerating", The Who's "My Generation", The Beatles' "Tomorrow Never Knows", Bob Dylan's "Like a Rolling Stone", and The Rolling Stones' "Black Angel".

== Discography ==
=== Studio albums ===
Year	Title	Label	Notes
1979	Wild Suspense	Island/Mango	
1981	Fire House Rock	Greensleeves	
1981	Wailing	Jah Guidance	
1982	Inchpinchers	Greensleeves/Shanachie	
1983	On The Rocks	Greensleeves	
1983	Baby Come Rock	Joe Gibbs Music	
1984	Stranded	Greensleeves/Gorgon	
1986	Lay It on the Line	Live & Learn	
1987	Kingston 14	Live & Learn	
1989	Stormy Night	Rohit International	
1991	Reggae Ina Firehouse	Live & Learn	recorded 1988
1992	All Over The World	Chaos	
1994	Live On	Zoo	
1997	Tension	Big Ship	
1998	Psychedelic Souls	Pow Wow	
2000	Equality	MusicBlitz	
2003	Square Deal	Studio One	
2003	Souvenir From Jamaica	Artists Only!	
2017	Island Girl	Black Oak Studios	
2020	Back A Yard	Greensleeves	

=== Live albums ===
Year	Title	Label	Notes
2006	Classic Jamaican Flava	2b1	recorded live in San Francisco

=== Compilations ===
Year	Title	Label	Notes
1975	The Wailing Souls	Studio One	recorded 1969–1970
1982	Soul and Power	Studio One	recorded 1969–1970
1984	The Best of Wailing Soul	Empire/Channel One	
1985	The Best of Wailing Soul	Sunset	
1987	The Very Best Of The Wailing Souls	Greensleeves	
1999	Reggae Legends Vol 1	Artists Only!	
2002	Face The Devil	Silverline	reissue of Wailing with dubs
2003	Classic Souls	Artists Only!	
2004	Wailing Souls at Channel One	Pressure Sounds	
2007	Most Wanted: Classic Cuts 1978–1984	Greensleeves	

=== Singles ===
- "Lost Love" (196?) – as The Renegades
- "Bongonyah" (1969), Camel – as The Little Roys
- "Fight Them" (1970), Camel – as The Little Roys
- "Gold Digger" (1970), Camel – as The Little Roys
- "Selassie Want Us Back" (1970), Camel – as The Little Roys
- "Row Fisherman Row" (1970), Banana
- "Back Out" (1970), Banana
- "Mr. Fire Coal Man"
- "Walk Walk Walk" (1971), Banana
- "Harbour Shark" (1971), Green Door
- "Dungeon" (1972), Punch
- "You Should've Known Better" (1972), Punch
- "Don't Fight It" (1972), Coxsone
- "Wicked A Go Dread" (1973), Del Prado - as Pipe & The Pipers (also Micron '75 reissue)
- "War" (1974), Channel One – with Ranking Trevor
- "Things and Time" (1974), Channel One
- "Back Out" (1976), Conflict
- "Feel the Spirit" (1976), Massive
- "Bredda Gravalicious" (1977), Massive
- "Something Funny" (1978), Island
- "Fire Mus Mus Tail" (1978), Channel One
- "Very Well" (1978), Channel One
- "Joy Within Your Heart" (1978), Well Charge/Hitbound
- "Kingdom Rise Kingdom Fall" (1980), Greensleeves
- "Lawless Society" (1980), Channel One
- "Old Broom" (1980), Taxi
- "Sweet Sugar Plum" (1980), Taxi
- "See Baba Joe" (1980), Greensleeves – B-side of Michael Prophet's "Help Them Please"
- "Stick Together" (1980), Studio One
- "Rude Boy Say Him Bad" (1981), Cha Cha
- "Penny I Love You" (1981), Cha Cha
- "Waterhouse Rock" (1981), Jah Guidance
- "Bandit Taking Over" (1981), Jah Guidance
- "Run Dem Down" (1981), Jah Guidance
- "Up Front" (1981), Greensleeves
- "Who No Waan Come" (1981), Greensleeves
- "Stalk a Sensimenia" (198?), Thompson Sound
- "Down Hearted" (198?), Thompson Sound
- "Wha Happen Dey" (198?), Gorgon
- "I Shent Thee" (1982), Jah Guidance
- "Baby Come Back" (1982), Volcano
- "Take a Taste" (1982), Jah Guidance
- "Sweetie Come Brush Me" (1982), Arrival
- "Grabbing and Running" (1982), Cha Cha
- "Take We Back" (1982), Jah Guidance
- "Diamonds & Pearls" (1982), Greensleeves
- "They Don't Know Jah" (1982), Greensleeves
- "Rastaman" (1982), Jah Guidance
- "Bounce Back" (1983), Greensleeves
- "Water Pumpee" (1983), Greensleeves
- "Take a Taste" (1983), Upfront
- "War Deh Round A John Shop" (1984), Greensleeves
- "Who Fa Say a The Best" (1985), Rockers Forever – B-side of Johnny Osbourne's "If Jah Didn't Love You"
- "Dance Hall Nice Again" (1986), Tuff Gong
- "Lay It on the Line" (1986), Live & Learn
- "Informer" (1987), Live & Learn
- "Dog Bite" (1987), Live & Love
- "Full Moon" (1987), Live & Learn
- "Shark Attack" (1992), Chaos
- "All Over the World" (1992), Columbia
- "If I Were You" (1992), Chaos
- "Wild Wild Life" (1994), Columbia
- "Row Fisherman Row" (1997), Big Ship
- "Tension" (1997)
- "Kingdom Rise" (2000), Thompson Sound
- "World Abomination" (2004), Famous
- "Firehouse Rock" (2006), Jah Guidance
