= Red (Black Uhuru album) =

Studio album by Black Uhuru
- Released: May 1981
- Studios: Channel One, Kingston, Jamaica; Compass Point, Nassau, Bahamas
- Genre: Reggae
- Length: 39:24
- Labels: Mango, Island, Warner Bros.
- Producer: Sly and Robbie

Black Uhuru chronology
| Sinsemilla (1981) | Red (1981) | Chill Out (1982) |

Red is the fourth album by the Jamaican reggae band Black Uhuru, released in 1981. The line-up of the band changed many times during its 16 years but this is the second release for the line-up of Michael Rose, Sandra "Puma" Jones and Derek "Duckie" Simpson. Sly & Robbie were again in the production seat after having previously worked with the band on the 1980 album Sinsemilla.

The album received critical acclaim.

== Reception ==
Professional ratings
Review scores
| Source | Rating |
|---|---|
| AllMusic | 5/5 stars |
| Christgau's Record Guide | A− |
| Q | 4/5 stars |
| The Rolling Stone Album Guide | 5/5 stars |

Red was ranked by NME at No. 3 among the best albums of 1981.

The Rolling Stone Album Guide wrote that Rose's "elaborately ornamented phrasing has more in common with cantorial singing than with typical reggae vocal style." In 2023, Rolling Stone ranked Red at number 466 on its list of "The 500 Greatest Albums of All Time".

== Track listing ==
All tracks are written by Michael Rose unless stated.

| No. | Title | Writer(s) | Length |
|---|---|---|---|
| 1. | "Youth of Eglington" | | 5:00 |
| 2. | "Sponji Reggae" | | 4:56 |
| 3. | "Sistren" | Rose, Derrick "Duckie" Simpson | 4:34 |
| 4. | "Journey" | Simpson | 5:21 |
| 5. | "Utterance" | | 3:42 |
| 6. | "Puff She Puff" | | 5:08 |
| 7. | "Rockstone" | Rose, Simpson | 4:38 |
| 8. | "Carbine" | | 6:05 |

Bonus tracks 2003
| No. | Title | Writer(s) | Length |
|---|---|---|---|
| 9. | "Sponji Reggae" (Discomix) | | 10:32 |
| 10. | "Trodding" (Dub version of "Journey") | Simpson | 5:18 |

== Personnel ==
Black Uhuru

- Michael Rose - vocals
- Derrick "Duckie" Simpson - harmony vocals
- Puma Jones - harmony vocals

with:

- Sly Dunbar - Drums, syndrums
- Robert "Robbie" Shakespeare - bass, piano
- Ranchie McLean - rhythm guitar, lead guitar
- Mikey Chung - rhythm guitar, lead guitar
- Radcliff "Dougie" Bryan - lead guitar
- Barry Reynolds - lead guitar on "Carbine"
- Robert Lyn - piano
- Keith Sterling - piano
- Uziah "Sticky" Thompson - percussion

Technical

- Chris Blackwell - executive producer
- Soldgie (Cedrica Anthony Hamilton) - sound engineer
- Lancelot "Maxie" McKenzie - vocal engineer
- Kendal Stubbs - guitar overdubs engineer
- Johnnie Black - photography
