= As the World Turns (album) =

Studio album by Black Uhuru
- Released: September 7, 2018
- Studios: Double Lion Studio (Chico, California); Gibby Morrison Studio (Kingston, Jamaica); St. Mary (Jamaica)
- Genre: Roots reggae
- Length: 54:32
- Label: Black Uhuru Official
- Producers: Mike Gener (exec.); Black Uhuru; Don Chandler; Donovon "Vision" Rodrigues; Jermaine Forde; King Hopeton; Seani B

Black Uhuru chronology
Dynasty (2001)	As the World Turns (2018)

Professional ratings
Review scores
Source	Rating
Exclaim!	7/10

As the World Turns is a studio album by Jamaican reggae band Black Uhuru. It was released on September 7, 2018 through Black Uhuru Official. It was nominated for Grammy Award for Best Reggae Album at 61st Annual Grammy Awards.

== Track listing ==
No.	Title	Writer(s)	Length
1.	"As the World Turns"	Derrick Simpson; Ashaki Simpson	3:38
2.	"Spectrum"	Derrick Simpson	3:24
3.	"Stronger" (featuring Agent Sasco)	Derrick Simpson; Jeffrey Campbell; Joan McKenzie	3:53
4.	"War Crime"	Derrick Simpson; Ashaki Simpson	3:27
5.	"Stand Alone"	Derrick Simpson; Bob Marley	4:05
6.	"Betrayal"	Derrick Simpson; Ashaki Simpson	4:00
7.	"Jah Guide" (featuring Bugle)	Derrick Simpson; Roy Thompson; Peter Tosh	3:36
8.	"Chalice"	Derrick Simpson	3:43
9.	"Jamaica Herbman"	Derrick Simpson; Bob Marley; Richie Havens	2:24
10.	"Ganja Baby"	Derrick Simpson; Ashaki Simpson	3:15
11.	"Five Star General"	Derrick Simpson; Ashaki Simpson	3:44
12.	"Police & Thief"	Derrick Simpson; Junior Murvin	3:43
13.	"Bone Alone"	Derrick Simpson	4:23
14.	"Slaughter"	Derrick Simpson	4:18
15.	"Live & Learn" (featuring Prezident Brown)	Derrick Simpson; Fitz Albert Cotterell	2:59
Total length:			54:32

== Personnel ==
- Black Uhuru – main artist, producers
- Derrick "Duckie" Simpson – vocals, producer, executive producer
- Horace "King Hopeton" Campbell – keyboards, drum programming, producer, engineering, mastering
- Leebert "Gibby" Morrison – guitar
- Cliff Manswell – bass
- Roland "Phanso" Wilson – drums
- Jay William – drum machine, mixing
- Everald Ray – horn
- Wayne Holliness – keyboards (track 14)
- Anthony "Tony Asher" Brissett – keyboards (track 15)
- Frederick "Fat Strings" Thomas – guitar (tracks: 8, 14, 15)
- Donovon "Vision" Rodrigues – bass (tracks: 8, 14, 15), producer
- Danny "Axeman" Thompson – bass (track 13)
- Joslyn "Speckles" McKenzie – drums (tracks: 14, 15)
- Jeffrey Campbell – vocals (track 3)
- Roy "Bugle" Thompson – vocals (track 7)
- Fitz Albert Cotterell – vocals (track 15)
- Nikki Burt – background vocals
- Carlene "Kay Starr" Ford – background vocals (track 14)
- Jermaine "Jah-Son" Forde – producer, mixing
- Maurice "Seani B" Delauney – producer
- Don Chandler – producer
- Robert "Taj" Walton – mixing
- Mike Gener – executive producer, design
- Stephanie Long – design
- Carmelita Harris – photography
- Sampsa Sipila – photography
- Benji Cooper – photography
- Jan Salzman – photography

All tracks mastered by Mario "Syantis" Lawrence at Anchor/Music Works Studio
