= Black Uhuru =

Jamaican reggae group

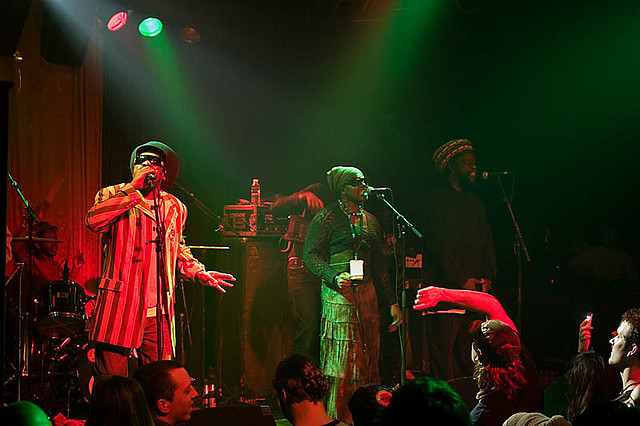
- Black Uhuru performing in 2007

Background information
- Also known as: Uhuru; Black Sounds Uhuru
- Origin: Kingston, Jamaica
- Genres: Reggae; dub
- Years active: 1972–present
- Labels: Taxi; Island; Real Authentic Sound; Mesa Recordings; Warner Bros.; Black Rose
- Members: Derrick "Duckie" Simpson; Kaye Starh; Andrew Bees
- Past members: Don Carlos; Garth Dennis; Puma Jones; Errol "Tarzan" Nelson; Junior Reid; Michael Rose; Jeniffer Niyah; Frank Stepanek; Sly Dunbar; Robbie Shakespeare; Vince Black; Darryl Thompson; Mikey Chung
- Website: blackuhuruofficial.com

Black Uhuru is a Jamaican reggae group formed in 1972, initially as Uhuru (Swahili for 'freedom'). The group has undergone several line-up changes over the years, with Derrick "Duckie" Simpson as the mainstay. They had their most successful period in the 1980s, with their album Anthem winning the first ever Grammy Award for Best Reggae Album in 1985.

== History ==
The group formed in the Waterhouse district of Kingston in 1972, initially called “Uhuru" (the Swahili word for freedom), with a line-up of Garth Dennis, Don Carlos, and Derrick "Duckie" Simpson. Their first release was a cover version of The Impressions' "Romancing to the Folk Song", which was followed by "Time is on Our Side"; Neither song was a success and they split up, with Carlos pursuing a solo career, as did Dennis, before joining The Wailing Souls. Simpson also briefly worked with the Wailing Souls, before forming a new version of Uhuru with Errol Nelson (of The Jayes) and Michael Rose, the group now taking the name Black Sounds Uhuru. Their Prince Jammy-produced debut album, Love Crisis, was released in 1977.

Nelson returned to The Jayes in late 1977, and was replaced the following year by Sandra "Puma" Jones, a social worker from South Carolina, US, who had previously worked as a dancer for Ras Michael and the Sons of Negus, and as a member of the group Mama Africa. The band now took on their most familiar name, Black Uhuru. The group began working extensively with Sly and Robbie, and recorded a string of successful singles, including "General Penitentiary" a re-recording of Rose's solo hit "Guess Who's Coming to Dinner", and "Shine Eye Gal", which featured guest guitarist Keith Richards. The group's second album Showcase drew on these singles, and the band cemented their status with a performance at the 1980 Reggae Sunsplash Festival. They planned to record an album with Dennis Brown producing, but this did not materialise, although two singles, "Wood for My Fire" and "Rent Man", were released. They were signed by Island Records in 1980, who issued the Sinsemilla album to an international audience in 1981. The follow-up, Red reached number 28 in the UK Albums Chart in 1981, Chill Out reached number 38 a year later, and they toured with The Rolling Stones. In 1989, their album Red was ranked No. 23 on Rolling Stone magazine's list of the "100 greatest albums of the 1980s." Their next studio album, Anthem, appeared in 1984, and won the first ever Grammy Award for Best Reggae Album the following year.

Despite this success, Rose left the group in 1984 to resume his solo career after falling out with Simpson, and was replaced by Junior Reid. They signed to RAS Records and moved in a different direction with the album Brutal and the single "The Great Train Robbery", the latter recorded with New York dance producer Arthur Baker. Although these alienated much of their roots reggae following, Brutal was nominated for a Grammy and "The Great Train Robbery" gave them their second UK hit single, reaching number 62. The band began to disintegrate; their next album with Jammy was started but never completed, they stopped working with Sly and Robbie, and Jones left the band due to ill health (she died in 1990 from cancer). Her replacement was Janet "Olafunke" Reid, and the group returned in 1987 with the Positive album. Reid was unable to obtain a US visa, and unable to tour, left the band, followed shortly by Olafunke.

Black Uhuru, now reduced to Simpson alone, had been booked to play at an awards ceremony in California, which coincidentally had original Uhuru members Don Carlos and Garth Dennis on the bill, and they took the opportunity to reunite the original line-up for a performance at the event, and decided to continue afterwards. The Now album followed in 1991, and was also nominated for a Grammy Award. In 1996 the group fragmented again, with Simpson leaving to tour Europe with dub poet Yasus Afari, under the name Black Uhuru, while Carlos and Dennis also toured the US under the same name. A legal battle over the name followed, won by Simpson in 1997. Carlos resumed his solo career, while Simpson formed a new line-up of Black Uhuru with Andrew Bees and Jennifer Connolly. Only one album Unification ensued and then the band interchange in 1999 which introduced Kaye Starh as the new background vocalist at D Bus Negril. She was signed exclusively for in studio and live performances. The band went on a European tour billed as Black Uhuru featuring Sly and Robbie in the summer of 2000. Black Uhuru with Duckie Simpson, Kaye Starh and Andrew Bees promoted the Unification album and the tour was also an introduction of Kaye Starh to the international reggae music scene.

In 2001, the Dynasty album was released with Duckie Simpson, Andrew Bees and Pam Hall providing vocals and featuring Sly and Robbie again on drums and bass. Bees went back to pursue his solo career in 2003.

In February 2004, it was announced in the Jamaican press that Simpson and Michael Rose had reunited under the name "Black Uhuru feat. Michael Rose". Together with the female background vocalist Kaye Starh they released a single, "Dollars", and performed at several concerts including "Western Consciousness 2004" on 28 April in Jamaica, of which a live video was released shortly thereafter. A new album was reported to be in progress, although it was never released. The group toured throughout Europe in 2006.

In 2008, Simpson took on lead vocal duties with Kaye Starh with interchangeable female vocals as they toured Brazil in 2010. With collaborative efforts from Kaye Starh, Duckie Simpson recorded the new album, As the World Turns, with guest appearances from Aterciopelados and Jarabe De Palo, although this was still unreleased a year later due to the mastering files configuration issues. A 25th Anniversary Edition DVD of their Live in London concert was released in June 2008. Derrick "Duckie" Simpson, Andrew Bees, and Kaye Starh has been touring the US, Europe and North and South America and also the Caribbean performing at Moonsplash in Anguilla.

Andrew Bees returned to the group in 2010 and he along with Duckie Simpson and Kaye Starh performed at a festival in Puerto Rico. Later that year Duckie Simpson, Kaye Starh and Andrew Bees performed at Bonnaroo in 2011 with a successful East Coast tour sharing stages with Shaggy. Following the success of the East Coast tour of the following year, Black Uhuru featuring Duckie Simpson, Kaye Starh and Andrew Bees went on to do another successful East Coast tour sharing stage with Sean Paul and a West Coast tour with a performance at The BB King Blues Club in New York in 2012. The band closed that tour at the Red Lounge in Philadelphia.

In 2012, Black Uhuru was honoured with the Lifetime Achievement Award in music by the IRAMA and were also given The Key For The City of Las Vegas, which made 31 August officially Black Uhuru Day in Las Vegas. The band, composed of Duckie Simpson, Kaye Starh and Andrew Bees, was invited to take part in a red carpet event representing the continent of the Caribbean in a Broadway musical dubbed Loving The Silent Tears in 2012, which was held at The Shrine Auditorium in Los Angeles. The band returned to Jamaica then went on a European tour in 2013.

In 2014, Jojo Mac joined the group, but left in 2016 to continue with her solo career. Black Uhuru undertook a US tour in 2016 with Andrew Bees on lead vocals and Elsa Green on backing vocals. Singer Onesty opened for the band. Black Uhuru undertook a US tour in 2016 with Duckie Simpson, Elsa Green on backing vocals and Andrew Bees as the lead and the singer Onesty opened with her band. Black Uhuru re-recorded the album As the World Turns with collaborative efforts from Kaye Starh. This was released in September 2018.

On 29 June 2025, the band played at the Glastonbury Festival for the first time since 1989, on the West Holts stage, with the set being available via BBC iPlayer. Writing in The Guardian, Jason Okundaye said, "And they look impossibly cool. ... it's the older international Black acts who are able to project the fresh, snazzy and authoritative aura that other acts, legacy or otherwise, could only dream of."

== Selected album discography ==
- 1980 – Sinsemilla
- 1981 – Red
- 1982 – Chill Out
- 1983 – Guess Who's Coming to Dinner (Black Uhuru re-edition)
- 1983 – Anthem
- 1986 – Brutal
- 1987 – Positive
- 1990 – Now
- 1991 – Iron Storm
- 1993 – Mystical Truth
- 1994 – Strongg
- 2001 – Dynasty
- 2018 – As the World Turns
- 2022 – New Day

== Awards and nominations ==
Black Uhuru has won one Grammy award and were nominated eight times.

Year	Nominee / work	Award	Result
1982	Reggae Sunsplash '81, A Tribute To Bob Marley	Best Ethnic or Traditional Folk Recording	Nominated
1984	Anthem	Best Reggae Recording	Won
1986	Brutal	Best Reggae Recording	Nominated
1990	Now	Best Reggae Recording	Nominated
1991	Iron Storm	Best Reggae Album	Nominated
1993	Mystical Truth	Best Reggae Album	Nominated
1994	Strongg	Best Reggae Album	Nominated
2018	As the World Turns	Best Reggae Album	Nominated
