= Doctor Dread =

American musician

Gary Himelfarb (born 1954), aka Doctor Dread, is an American reggae producer who founded RAS Records. He is notable for his respectful dedication to roots reggae artists; and in turn for helping spread their works and words throughout the world.

== Biography ==
Himelfarb was born in Washington, D.C. in 1954, and first visited Jamaica in 1977. In 1979 he began working as a disc jockey at WHFS, broadcasting under the name Dr. Dread. In 1981 he started RAS Records, initially as a distribution company.

An example of the work of Doctor Dread is the Israel Vibration three-disk set Power of the Trinity. Here Doctor Dread mixes I-Vibe songs with his interviews of members Lascelle "Wiss" Bulgin, Albert "Apple" Craig, and Cecil "Skelly" Spence. The result is a work of profound importance, not least in that it documents the polio outbreak in Jamaica in the 1950s, through the memories of some of its youngest sufferers.

He has worked with many artists including Bob Marley, Black Uhuru, Jimmy Cliff, Inner Circle, Gregory Isaacs, Luciano, Mad Cobra, Freddy Mcgregor, Sly and Robbie, Steel Pulse, The Wailers, and Bunny Wailer.

Himelfarb is also a board member of the Association for Independent Music.

A book documenting his experiences running RAS Records, The Half That's Never Been Told, was published in March 2015. He has now left the music business and has a new venture — Doctor Dread's Famous Jerk — a range of sauces and snacks, as well as an antique shop in northern California.
