= Garth Dennis =

Jamaican musician (1949–2021)

- Born: Rudolph Alando Dennis; 2 December 1949; Kingston, Jamaica
- Died: 9 December 2021 (aged 72) Ontario, California, U.S.
- Genres: Reggae
- Years active: 1972–2021
- Labels: Greensleeves, Mesa

Rudolph "Garth" Dennis (2 December 1949 – 9 December 2021) was a Jamaican musician who was a founder member of Black Uhuru, later a member of The Wailing Souls for ten years before returning to Black Uhuru in the mid-1980s, and also recorded as a solo artist.

== Life and career ==
Dennis was born on 2 December 1949 in Kingston, Jamaica. He grew up in Trenchtown, and became friends with Bob Marley, Peter Tosh, and Bunny Wailer. His older sister, Joanne, had a hit in Jamaica in 1964 with "You're Wondering Now", as part of the duo Andy & Joey (with Reuben Anderson). He formed Black Uhuru in 1972 with Don Carlos and Duckie Simpson. After the group's early releases Dennis left, going on to join the Wailing Souls in the mid-1970s, staying with them during their successful Channel One era.

When the core members of the Wailing Souls moved back to Jamaica in 1985 after a period in the United States, Dennis stayed behind, but later returned to Jamaica to rejoin the re-formed original lineup of Black Uhuru. With Black Uhuru, Dennis recorded the Grammy-nominated 1991 album Now and three further albums (along with dub versions). When Simpson left the group, Dennis and Carlos continued as Black Uhuru until December 1997, but Simpson also claimed the name, winning a legal case in 1998.

In 2008 Dennis returned to the Wailing Souls.

His first solo album, Trenchtown 19 3rd Street, which featured Sly Dunbar and Carlton "Santa" Davis, was released in February 2015. His second solo album was due for release in early 2020.

Dennis died from complications of pneumonia on 9 December 2021 at Kaiser Hospital in Ontario, California. He was 72 years old.

== Discography ==
=== Solo ===
==== Albums ====
- Trenchtown 19 3rd Street (2015)

==== Singles ====
- "Slow Coach", Sydna

=== with the Wailing Souls ===
- Wild Suspense (1979), Mango
- Wailing (1981), Jah Guidance
- Fire House Rock (1981), Greensleeves
- Soul & Power (1981), Studio One
- Inchpinchers (1982), Greensleeves
- Baby Come Rock (1983), Joe Gibbs Music
- On The Rocks (1983), Greensleeves
- Stranded (1984), Greensleeves

=== with Black Uhuru ===
- Now (1991), Mesa/Rhino
- Now Dub (1991), Mesa
- Iron Storm (1992), Mesa
- Iron Storm Dub (1992), Mesa
- Mystical Truth (1992), Mesa
- Mystical Truth Dub (1993), Mesa
- Live (1993), Sonic Sounds
- Strongg (1994), Mesa
- Strongg Dub (1994), Mesa
