= Guess Who's Coming to Dinner (album) =

Studio album by Black Uhuru
- Released: 1983
- Recorded: March 1980
- Studios: Channel One Recording Studio, Kingston, Jamaica
- Genres: Reggae, Dub
- Length: 47:00
- Label: Virgin
- Producers: Sly Dunbar, Robbie Shakespeare

Black Uhuru chronology
Chill Out (1982)	Guess Who's Coming to Dinner (1983)	Anthem (1983)

Professional ratings
Review scores
Source	Rating
Allmusic	4.5/5 stars

Guess Who's Coming to Dinner is a reggae album and single by Black Uhuru. The album was first released under the title Showcase in 1979, then as a re-edition entitled Black Uhuru in 1980, with the addition of "Shine Eye Gal" (featuring a guest performance by Keith Richards on guitar), and with different mixes of the original LP tracks (some shorter, some longer.) The Guess Who's Coming to Dinner release, from 1983, features remixed versions of the tracks, some of them significantly longer – nb: this is contrary to what Allmusic claims in its review.

The album was listed in the 1999 book The Rough Guide: Reggae: 100 Essential CDs.

== Track listing ==
All tracks are written by Michael Rose; except where indicated.

No.	Title	Writer(s)	Length
1.	"Shine Eye Gal"	Rose, Derrick "Duckie" Simpson	7:36
2.	"Leaving to Zion"		5:30
3.	"General Penitentiary"		5:32
4.	"Guess Who's Coming to Dinner"		6:18
5.	"Abortion"	Rose, Simpson	7:25
6.	"Natural Reggae Beat"		8:12
7.	"Plastic Smile"	Rose, Simpson	7:10

== Personnel ==
Black Uhuru

- Michael Rose - vocals
- Puma Jones - harmony vocals
- Derrick "Duckie" Simpson - harmony vocals

The Revolutionaries

- Radcliffe "Dougie" Bryan - guitar
- Robbie Shakespeare - bass
- Sly Dunbar - drums
- Keith Sterling - organ
- Winston Wright - organ

with:

- Keith Richards - guitar on "Shine Eye Gal"

Technical

- Delroy Witter - producer on "Shine Eye Gal"
- Sisan March - design
- Deborah Feingold - photography
