= Puma Jones =

American singer (1953–1990)

- Jones on the back cover of the Black Uhuru album Red in 1981

Background information
- Born: Sandra Jones; October 5, 1953; Columbia, South Carolina, U.S.
- Died: January 28, 1990 (aged 36)
- Genres: Reggae
- Years active: c.1975–1987

Sandra "Puma" Jones (October 5, 1953—January 28, 1990) was an American singer, best known as a member of the Grammy Award-winning reggae group Black Uhuru.

== Career ==
Born in Columbia, South Carolina, Jones graduated from Columbia University in New York City with a master's degree and served as a social worker. She studied dance with the Chuck Davis (dancer) troupe where she took a particular interest in African dance. After becoming disillusioned with city life she declared a need to "discover her roots" and moved to Jamaica.

Deciding to build a singing career, Jones briefly sang with Miriam Makeba (then using the name Mama Africa), and sang with the band Sons of Negus led by Ras Michael. In 1978, she was introduced by a mutual friend to Derrick "Duckie" Simpson, the leader of reggae group Black Uhuru. That group was undergoing a significant lineup change that also included the addition of singer Michael Rose. Jones became a full member of Black Uhuru and sang on seven studio albums, starting with Showcase in 1979 and also including the critically acclaimed Red in 1981 and the Grammy Award-winning Anthem in 1983. That album won the award for Best Reggae Album in 1985, the first year of that award's existence.

Jones was noted for adding lyrics on religious and social topics to Black Uhuru songs, during a period when reggae musicians were often accused of being trite and dismissive of women, and she was also known for her haunting voice. Her last full album with the group was Brutal in 1986, which was nominated for another Grammy Award and reached the charts in New Zealand and the Netherlands. Before sessions began for the album Positive in 1987, Jones was diagnosed with breast cancer. She had to withdraw from Black Uhuru and was replaced by singer Olafunke. Jones returned to the United States for treatment and died at age 36 on January 28, 1990. She was buried near her family home in South Carolina.
