= Michael Rose (singer) =

Jamaican reggae singer (born 1957)

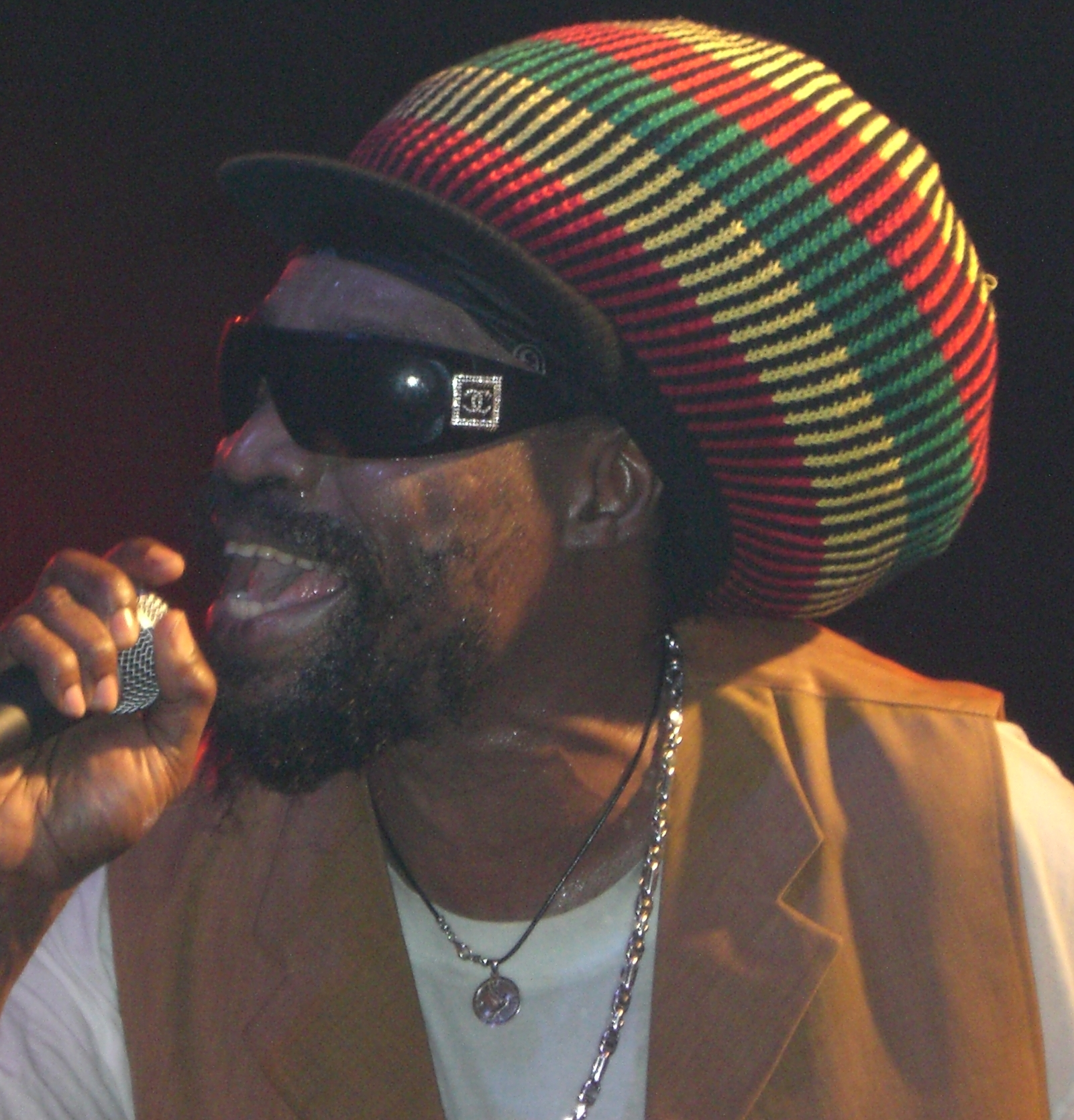
- Michael Rose in Dortmund, 2007

Background information
- Also known as: Mykal Rose
- Born: 11 July 1957 (age 69)
- Origin: Kingston, Jamaica
- Genres: Reggae Afrobeat
- Occupation: Singer – songwriter
- Years active: 1974–present
- Label: Kingmaker Music
- Formerly of: Black Uhuru

Michael Rose (born 11 July 1957) is a Jamaican reggae singer. He is most widely known for a successful tenure as the lead singer for Black Uhuru from 1977 to 1984, followed by a lengthy solo career. He has been praised as "one of Jamaica's most distinguished singers" and for launching a distinctive form of reggae singing that originated in his home neighborhood of Waterhouse in Kingston.

== Career ==
Rose began performing at talent contests and in the Jamaican hotel circuit as a teenager, and recorded his first single "Woman a Gineal fe True" at age 15 with producer Newton Simmons. Rose's childhood friend Sly Dunbar then introduced him to producer Niney the Observer, with whom he recorded several singles in 1972. Rose also recorded a song with Lee "Scratch" Perry during this period.

Rose spent the next several years honing his songwriting, releasing Born Free discomix in 1976 for Yabby You, whuch was later re-released on Steve Barrow’s Blood and Fire (record label) in 1997. In 1977, Dunbar introduced him to Derrick "Duckie" Simpson, the leader of reggae group Black Uhuru. That group was undergoing a significant lineup change that also included the addition of singer Puma Jones. Rose became the group's lead singer and primary songwriter, leading the group through seven studio albums, starting with Showcase in 1979 and also including the critically acclaimed Red in 1981 and the Grammy Award-winning Anthem in 1983. That album won the award for Best Reggae Album in 1985, the first year of that award's existence.

Rose left Black Uhuru in 1985 after falling out with Simpson, and retired to the Blue Mountains in Jamaica to start a coffee farm. He released a string of singles in Jamaica, but nothing much was heard of him outside the island until 1989, when he signed with RCA and released the pop-influenced album Proud in Europe and Japan. The deal with RCA was short-lived however, and Rose returned to Jamaica to record a string of singles produced by Sly and Robbie. He also recorded for other producers but the only albums released during this period were the Japan-only Bonanza (1991) and King of General (1992). The singles from this period were eventually compiled on the album Sly and Robbie Presents: Mykall Rose – The Taxi Sessions in 1995. During that year he also signed with Heartbeat Records.

In the 1995–2004 period Heartbeat Records released a total of nine albums, and Rose regularly reached the singles charts in Jamaica and Europe. He rejoined Black Uhuru in 2004 for a multi-year tour under the name Black Uhuru featuring Michael Rose. During this period he continued to record and perform as a solo artist. In 2019 he released his first album in eleven years, the ska project Ska Ska Ska. His 2022 single "Glory to Jah" attracted media attention in Jamaica.

In 2022, Rose began performing at festivals in the US with Lee "Scratch" Perry's former band Subatomic Sound System including appearances in 2023 at CaliVibes Fest, CaliRoots, the Marley Brothers’ KayaFest at Red Rocks, and in 2024 at KCRW's Reggae at Night Hollywood Bowl. The album Rockin' Like a Champion was released on July 26, 2024, a collaboration between Mykal Rose, Subatomic Sound System, and UK singer Hollie Cook put out jointly by the labels Dubshot & Controlled Substance Sound Labs. David Rodigan premiered the album title track on BBC Radio 1Xtra.

== Name spelling ==
His birth name is Michael Rose, and this name appears on most but not all of his solo albums. Starting in 1991 he changed the spelling to Mykal Rose claiming that this is the Ethiopian version of the name. He has also used various spellings including Mykal Roze, Mikal Rose, Michael Roze, and other minor variations.

== Discography ==
- Proud (1990)
- Bonanza (Japan) (1992)
- King of General (1994)
- Voice of the Ghetto (1995)
- Michael Rose (1995)
- Rising Star (1995)
- Be Yourself (1996)
- Big Sound Frontline (1996)
- Nuh Carbon (1996)
- Dance Wicked (1997)
- Dub Wicked (1997)
- Selassie I Showcase (1997)
- Party in Session: Live (1998)
- Bonanza (1999)
- X Uhuru (1999)
- Never Give It Up (2001)
- Live in San Francisco (2002), re-released in 2003 as Live at Maritime Hall
- Fire Fire Burning (2002)
- Happiness: The Best of Michael Rose (2004)
- Babylon 9/11 - Tip of the Iceberg (2004)
- African Roots (2005)
- African Dub (2005)
- Babylon A Fight (2006)
- Warrior (2007)
- Passion of Life (2007)
- Warrior Dub (2007)
- The Saga (2007)
- Great Expectations (2008)
- Dub Expectations (2008)
- Reggae Legend (2012)
- Showdown Inna Bloody Town (2012)
- Sidewalk Steppa (2016)
- Ska Ska Ska (2019)
- Judge Not (2023)
- Rockin’ Like a Champion (2024)
- Diamond in the Ruff (2025)
- We Must Pray (2025)
- Aint No Sunshine (2025)
- Control Your Emotions (2025)
- Run Di Place (2025)
