= Anthem (Black Uhuru album) =

Studio album by Black Uhuru
- Released: June 1984
- Recorded: Compass Point Studios, Nassau, Bahamas and Dynamic Studio, Kingston, Jamaica
- Genre: Reggae
- Label: Mango
- Producer: Sly Dunbar, Robbie Shakespeare

Black Uhuru chronology
Guess Who's Coming to Dinner (1981)	Anthem (1984)	Live (1984)

Professional ratings
Review scores
Source	Rating
AllMusic	2.5/5 stars
Christgau's Record Guide	A

Anthem is an album by Black Uhuru, originally released in Jamaica and the UK in 1983 and remixed for international release in 1984. In 1985, it won the first Grammy Award for Best Reggae Recording. It has been released in three editions, each with a different track listing and mix, and as a box set.

== History ==
Lyrically, Anthem retains the sharpness of its predecessors, criticizing social injustice and economic materialism and extolling Rastafarian values such as Afrocentrism, social equality and an ital diet. Musically, and particularly in the U.S. version, it fuses roots reggae and dub with "synthetic", electropop instrumentation and effects, resulting in an "ambiance of pop-reggae futurism".

== Legacy ==
Anthem won the Grammy Award for Best Reggae Recording in 1985, the first year the award existed.

The album was well-received, earning Black Uhuru the highest accolades and broadest audience of their career. The traditionally non-reggae elements added in the remixes were polarizing. Both Robert Christgau and Allmusic's John Gonsalves were dubious about the remixes; Christgau felt that the songs held up in spite of the added effects while Gonsalves did not.

The album's success led to tensions between Duckie Simpson and Michael Rose, resulting in Rose's departure from the group. Rose has stated that the album "came before its time".

The song "What Is Life" was featured in an episode of Miami Vice titled "The Big Thaw".

== Releases ==
Anthem has been released in three editions: the original recording, the UK remix and the US remix; despite their names, both of the latter were marketed internationally. All three editions were included in a limited-edition box set, The Complete Anthem Sessions, along with non-album and previously unreleased tracks.

Originally produced by Sly and Robbie, the album was resequenced and remixed by record company Island Records, omitting gaps between songs and further emphasizing the electropop aspect, particularly on the US version. The UK and US editions respectively omitted "Party Next Door" and the Sly and the Family Stone cover "Somebody's Watching You", substituting a cover of Steven Van Zandt's "Solidarity", a charting non-album single from late 1983.

== Track listing ==
Island ILPS 9769 (UK), originally released November 1983. Track lengths are for the original, uncut versions.

No.	Title	Writer(s)	Length
1.	"What Is Life?"	Simpson	5:42
2.	"Party Next Door"	Rose	3:06
3.	"Try It"	Rose	5:28
4.	"Black Uhuru Anthem"	Simpson	5:28
5.	"Botanical Roots"	Rose	4:58
6.	"Somebody's Watching You"	Sylvester Stewart	5:47
7.	"Bull in the Pen"	Rose	5:23
8.	"Elements"	Simpson	3:52

== Track listing: UK remix ==
Island ILPS 9773 (UK), originally released July 1984. All tracks remixed by Paul "Groucho" Smykle.

No.	Title	Writer(s)	Length
1.	"What Is Life?"	Simpson	4:21
2.	"Solidarity"	Steven Van Zandt	4:22
3.	"Black Uhuru Anthem"	Simpson	5:17
4.	"Try It"	Rose	4:59
5.	"Botanical Roots"	Rose	4:14
6.	"Somebody's Watching You"	Stewart	4:32
7.	"Bull in the Pen"	Rose	4:08
8.	"Elements"	Simpson	4:36

== Track listing: US remix ==
Island 90180-1 (US), originally released July 1984. All tracks remixed by Paul "Groucho" Smykle except as indicated.

No.	Title	Writer(s)	Length
1.	"What Is Life? (ET Thorngren US Remix)"	Simpson	5:05
2.	"Solidarity"	Van Zandt	4:28
3.	"Black Uhuru Anthem"	Simpson	5:17
4.	"Try It"	Rose	4:59
5.	"Botanical Roots"	Rose	3:31
6.	"Party Next Door (ET Thorngren US Remix)"	Rose	5:49
7.	"Bull in the Pen"	Rose	4:09
8.	"Elements"	Simpson	4:35

== Track listing: The Complete Anthem Sessions ==
Hip-O Select B0002661-02, released 2004 (box set). Also marketed as The Complete Anthem and simply Anthem.

CD 1: Original full-length version
No.	Title	Writer(s)	Length
1.	"What Is Life?"	Simpson	5:42
2.	"Party Next Door"	Rose	3:06
3.	"Try It"	Rose	5:28
4.	"Black Uhuru Anthem"	Simpson	5:28
5.	"Botanical Roots"	Rose	4:58
6.	"Somebody's Watching You"	Sylvester Stewart	5:47
7.	"Bull in the Pen"	Rose	5:23
8.	"Elements"	Simpson	3:51
9.	"Party Next Door" (Bonus track; from UK 12" single Island 12IS133, August 1983)	Rose	5:55
10.	"Party In Session" (Bonus track; from UK 12" single Island 12IS133, August 1983)	Rose	5:53

CD 2: Original dub remix (previously unreleased)
No.	Title	Writer(s)	Length
1.	"What Is Life?"	Simpson	5:42
2.	"Try It"	Rose	5:23
3.	"Black Uhuru Anthem"	Simpson	5:35
4.	"Botanical Roots"	Rose	10:36
5.	"Somebody's Watching You"	Stewart	6:28
6.	"Bull in the Pen"	Rose	5:59
7.	"Elements"	Simpson	4:52

CD 3: UK remix
No.	Title	Writer(s)	Length
1.	"What Is Life?"	Simpson	4:21
2.	"Solidarity"	Steven Van Zandt	4:22
3.	"Black Uhuru Anthem"	Simpson	5:17
4.	"Try It"	Rose	4:59
5.	"Botanical Roots"	Rose	4:14
6.	"Somebody's Watching You"	Stewart	4:32
7.	"Bull in the Pen"	Rose	4:08
8.	"Elements"	Simpson	4:36
9.	"What Is Life (Francis Kevorkian remix)" (Bonus track; from UK 12" single Island 12IS150, July 1984)	Simpson	6:42
10.	"Solidarity (Zeus B Held remix)" (Bonus track; from UK 12" single Island 12IS150, July 1984)	Van Zandt	4:11
11.	"Party Next Door (ET Thorngren Remix)" (Bonus track; from UK 12" single Island 12IS150, July 1984)	Rose	5:27

CD 4: US remix
No.	Title	Writer(s)	Length
1.	"What Is Life? (ET Thorngren US Remix)"	Simpson	5:05
2.	"Solidarity"	Van Zandt	4:28
3.	"Black Uhuru Anthem"	Simpson	5:17
4.	"Try It"	Rose	4:59
5.	"Botanical Roots"	Rose	3:31
6.	"Party Next Door (ET Thorngren US Remix)"	Rose	5:49
7.	"Bull in the Pen"	Rose	4:09
8.	"Elements"	Simpson	4:35
9.	"Somebody's Watching You (Bruce Forest remix)" (Bonus track; previously unreleased, recorded December 1983)	Stewart	8:20
10.	"Somebody's Watching You (Bruce Forest dub mix)" (Bonus track; previously unreleased, recorded December 1983)	Stewart	5:02

== Personnel ==
- Michael Rose – lead vocals
- Puma Jones – harmony vocals
- Duckie Simpson – harmony vocals
- Darryl Thomson – guitar
- Mikey Chung – rhythm guitar
- Robbie Shakespeare – bass
- Sly Dunbar – drums
- Franklyn "Bubbler" Waul, Radcliffe "Dougie" Bryan – keyboards
- Dean Fraser – saxophone
- Ronald "Nambo" Robinson – trombone
- David Madden, Junior "Chico" Chin – trumpet
- Bernie Worrell – clavinet on "Somebody's Watching You"
- Chris "Sky Juice" Burth – percussion on "Party Next Door"
- Sly and Robbie - producers (original and dub releases)
- Steven Stanley - mixing (original release)
- Black Uhuru, Steven Stanley and Paul "Groucho" Smykle - producers (UK and US remixes)
- Chris Blackwell - executive producer (UK and US remixes)
- Noel Hearne, Steven Stanley – engineers
- Lynn Goldsmith – photography
