= Don Carlos (musician) =

Jamaican musician (born 1952)

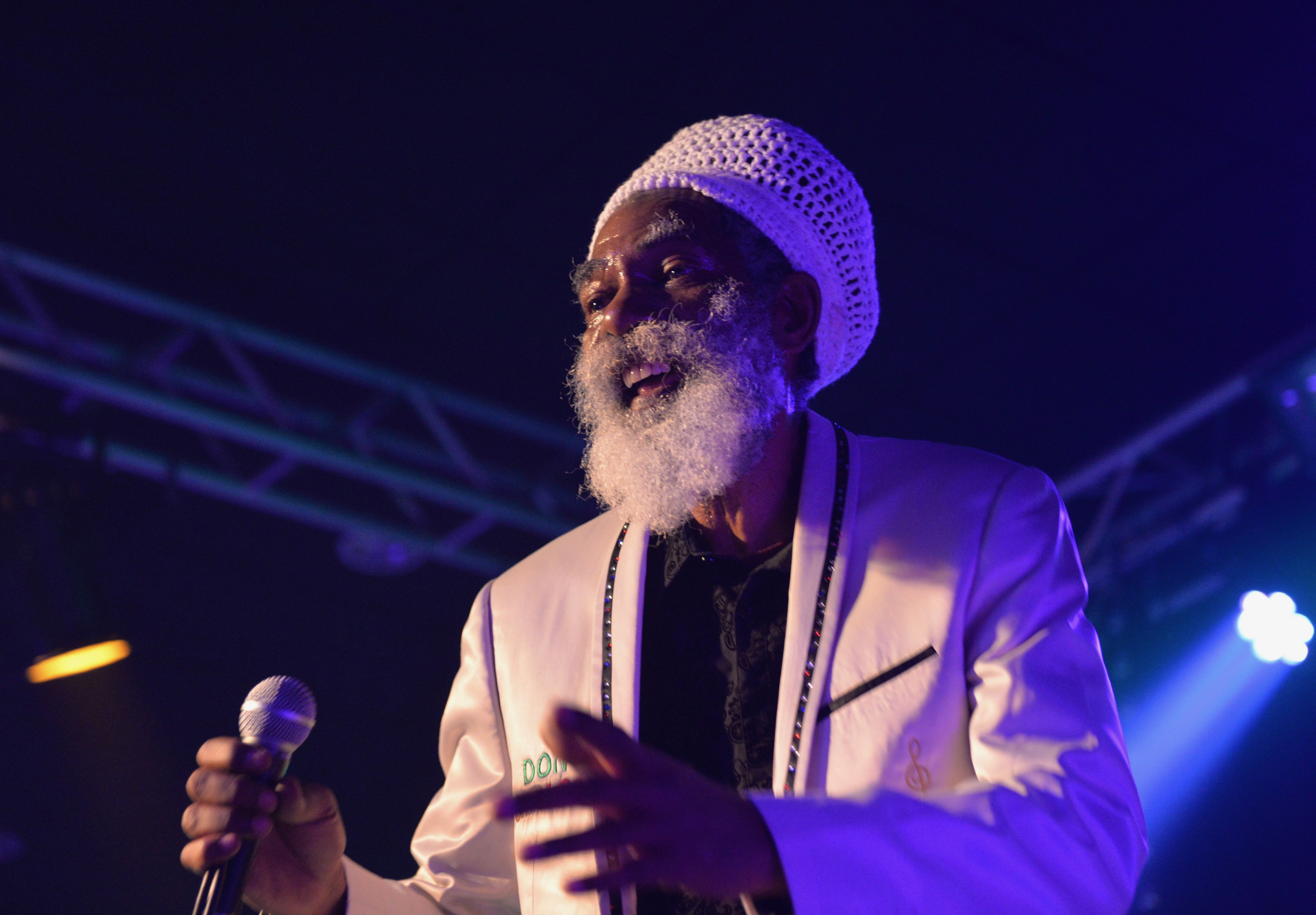
- Don Carlos in concert in Antwerp, June 15, 2018

Background information
- Also known as: Don Carlos
- Born: Euvin McCallus Spencer; 29 June 1952 (age 74)
- Origin: Kingston, Jamaica
- Genres: Reggae
- Occupation: Singer
- Years active: 1972–present
- Label: Reggae Gone Viral
- Formerly of: Black Uhuru

Euvin McCallus Spencer (born 29 June 1952), better known by his stage names Don Carlos or Don McCarlos, is a Jamaican reggae singer and deejay.

== Biography ==
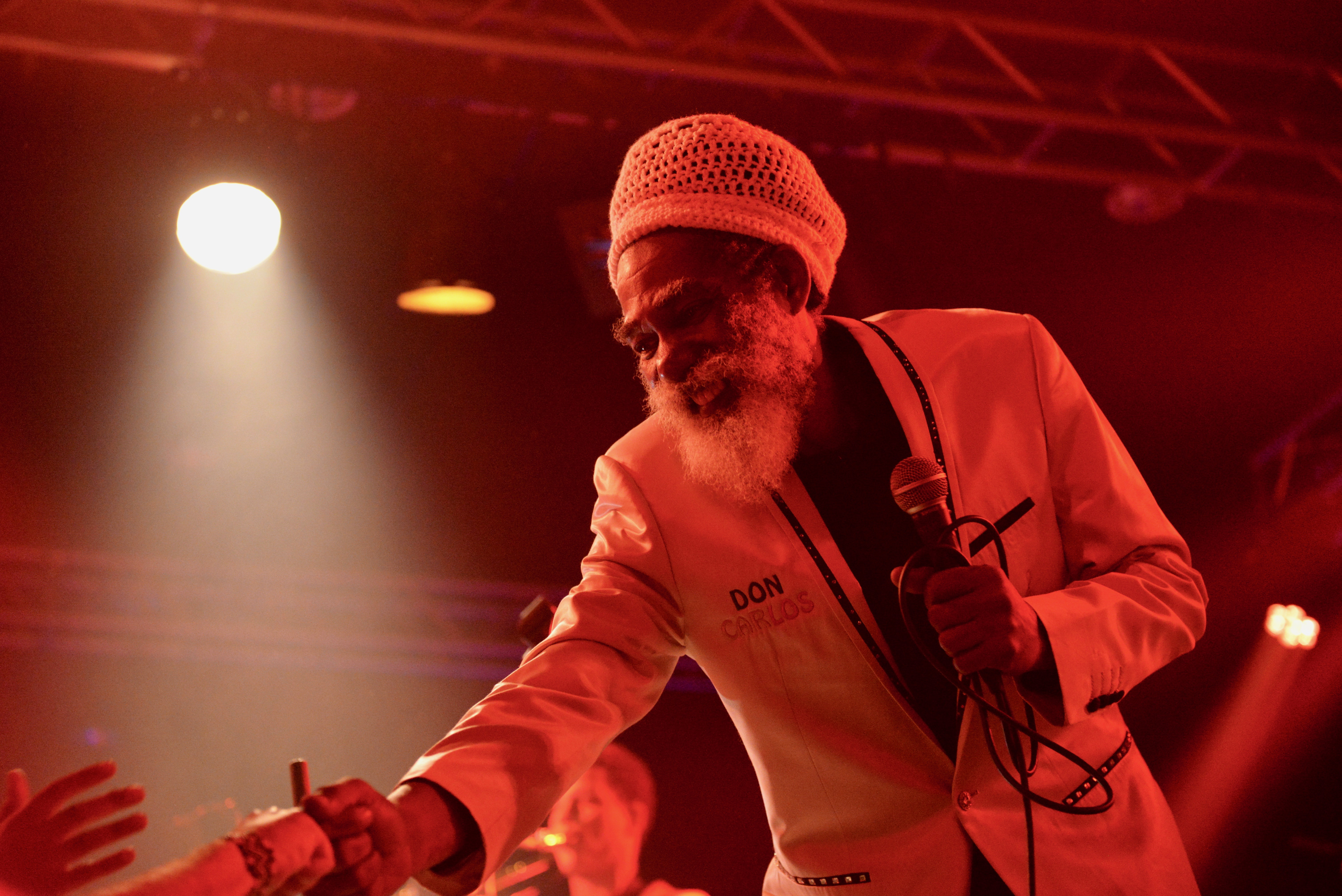
Carlos in concert in Antwerp, June 15, 2018

Don Carlos began singing in 1973 as a member of Black Uhuru. He sang alongside Garth Dennis and Derrick Simpson, the leader of the trio.

In 1988 he recorded "Jingle Bells" with Glenice Spenser on A Reggae Christmas on RAS Records. In 1990 he re-united as the lead vocalist for a Black Uhuru album. Carlos continues to perform all over the world, and has a large fanbase in Africa.

== Africa tours ==
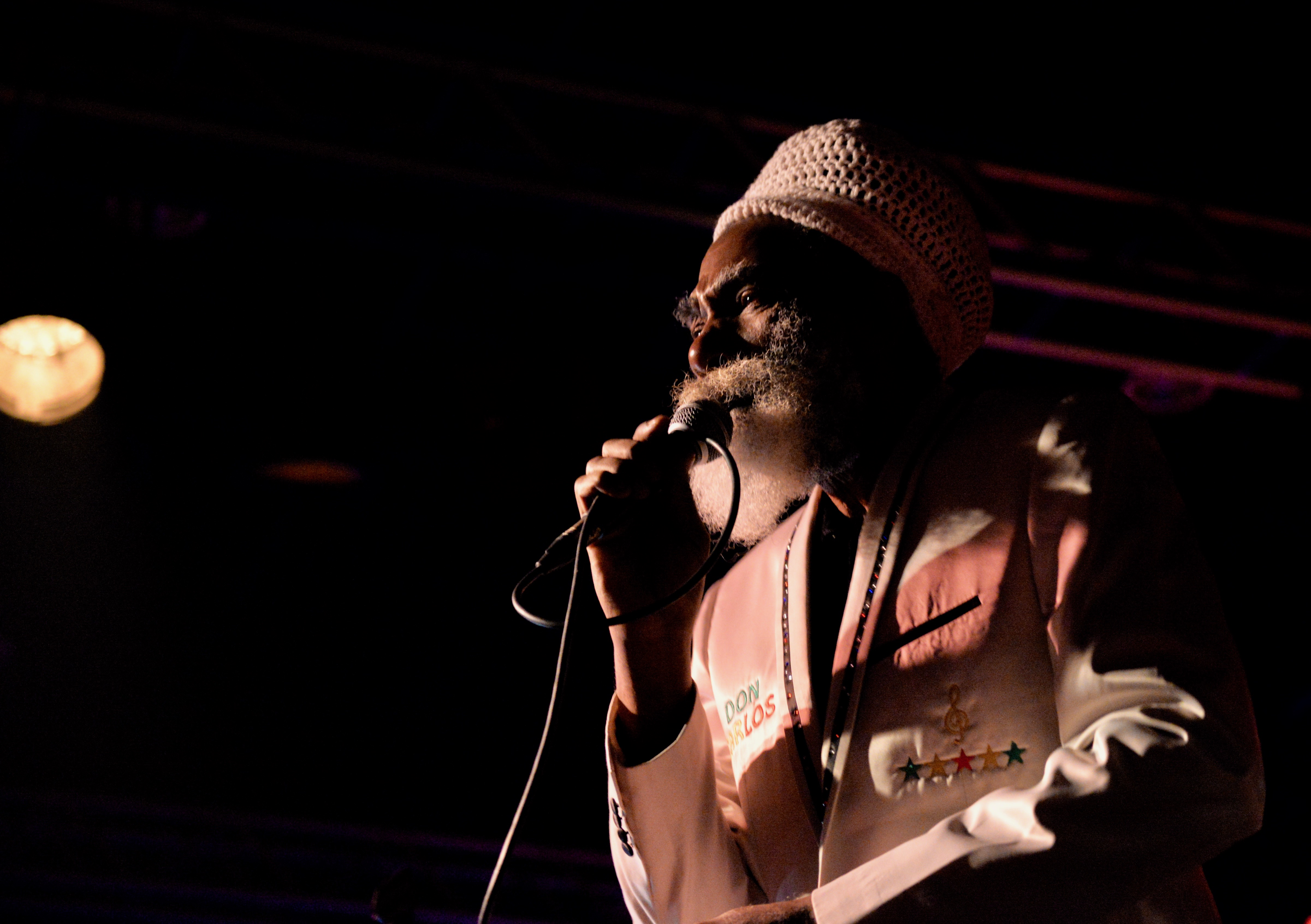
Carlos in concert in Antwerp, June 15, 2018

Carlos performed in Nairobi, Kenya in 2010 and on June 3, 2017. He performed in the Zambian cities Lusaka, Kitwe and Livingstone (Mosi-oa-Tunya) between 6 and 8 June 2014.

== Discography ==
=== Solo ===
- Suffering (1981), Negus Roots - also released as Prophecy
- Day to Day Living (1982), Greensleeves
- Harvest Time (1982), Negus Roots
- Spread Out (1983), Burning Sounds
- Pass the Lazer Beam (1983), Jackpot
- Just A Passing Glance (1984), RAS
- Deeply Concerned (1987), RAS
- Time Is The Master (1992), RAS
- 7 Days A Week (1998), RAS
- Dub Version (2000), Dressed to Kill
- Changes (2010), Heartbeat

=== Don Carlos & Gold ===
- Them Never Know Natty Dread Have Him Credential (1981), Channel One
- Raving Tonight (1983), RAS
- Ghetto Living (1983), Tamoki Wambesi
- Never Run Away (1984), Kingdom
- Plantation (1984), CSA
- Ease Up (1994), RAS

=== Split albums ===
- Prison Oval Clash (1980), Tamoki Wambesi - split with Earl Cunningham and Charlie Chaplin
- Roots & Culture (1982), Jah Guidance - split with Culture
- Show-Down Vol. 3 (1984), Empire/Channel One - Don Carlos & Gold/The Gladiators
- Rasta Brothers (1985), Dancefloor - with Anthony Johnson & Little John
- Firehouse Clash (1986), Live & Learn - with Junior Reid
- Head 2 Head (2001), Attack - Horace Andy & Don Carlos

=== Guest appearances ===
- Groundation - Hebron Gate (2002), Young Tree
- Groundation - Dragon War (2003), Young Tree
- Groundation - We Free Again (2004), Young Tree
- Slightly Stoopid - Top of the World - "Marijuana" (2012), Stoopid
- Slightly Stoopid - Live at Roberto's Tri Studios 9.13.11 - "Lazer Beam" (2014)
- Tribal Seeds - "Blood Clot" - Representing (2014)
- Rebelution - "Roots Reggae Music" - Count Me In (2014)
- Simple Creation - "?" - Golden Roots (2017)
- Slightly Stoopid - "Everyday Life, Everyday People" - Stay the Same (Prayer for You) (2018)
- Slightly Stoopid - "Everyday Life, Everyday People" - Talk Too Much (2018)

=== Compilations ===
- The Mighty Diamonds Meets Don Carlos & Gold at the Channel 1 Studio featuring The Revolutionaries, Hitbound - the Diamonds Right Time and Don Carlos & Gold's Them Never Know Natty Dread Have Him Credential albums combined
- Pure Gold, Jackpot
- Lazer Beam (1995), Culture Press
- Portrait (1997), RAS
- Jah Light (2002), Black Arrow
- Groove With Me (2003), Get Back
- Inna Dub Style - Rare Dubs 1979 - 1980 (2004), Jamaican Recordings
- Special Edition (2004), Jafada Music Productions
- Tribulation (2006), Attack
- Tribulation - Don Carlos In Dub (2007), Attack
- Kings of Reggae, Nocturne

=== DVD ===
- Live in San Francisco (2003), 2B1
- Live in Reggae Rising (2019)
