= RAS Records =

- Parent company: VP Records
- Founded: 1979
- Founder: Doctor Dread
- Distributors: Universal Music Group (physical); BMG Rights Management (digital)
- Genre: Reggae
- Country of origin: United States/United Kingdom/Jamaica
- Official website: http://www.rasrecords.com/

RAS Records, also known as Real Authentic Sound, is a reggae record label.

== History ==
RAS Records was founded in 1979 by Doctor Dread. In his travels to Jamaica he created a network within the reggae artist community there. By the early to mid-1980s, RAS had signed artists such as Black Uhuru, Inner Circle, Culture, Junior Reid, Yellowman, and Freddie McGregor. This allowed RAS to grow significantly throughout the world. To date, the label has also signed artists including Luciano, The Wailers Band, Sizzla and Tony Rebel.

== Awards ==
Over the years, several RAS artists have been nominated for a Grammy Award. In 1996, Bunny Wailer received an award for his tribute album, Hall of Fame: A Tribute to Bob Marley's 50th Anniversary.

== RAS artists ==
- Luciano
- Scream
- The Wailers Band
- Junior Reid
- Culture
- Black Uhuru
- Inner Circle
- Don Carlos
- Yellowman
- J.C. Lodge
- Freddie McGregor
- Sanchez
- Israel Vibration
- Steel Pulse
- Mad Cobra
- Mikey Spice
- Tiger
- Gregory Isaacs
- Brigadier Jerry
- Pinchers
- Eek-A-Mouse
- Half Pint
- Peter Broggs

== See also ==
List of record labels
