= Mystic Man =

Studio album by Peter Tosh
- Released: 1979
- Recorded: Dynamic Sound, Kingston, Jamaica
- Genre: Reggae
- Length: 44:24
- Label: Rolling Stones / EMI / Intel Diplo
- Producer: Peter Tosh, Word, Sound and Power (Keith Sterling, Mikey Chung, Robbie Lyn, Robbie Shakespeare, Sly Dunbar)

Peter Tosh chronology
Bush Doctor (1978)	Mystic Man (1979)	Wanted Dread & Alive (1981)

Mystic Man is the fourth studio album by Peter Tosh. All songs were composed by Peter Tosh. It was released in 1979 by Rolling Stones Records (his second album for the label), EMI, and Intel Diplo (in Jamaica).

The album's cover photo, by Annie Leibovitz, shows Tosh's head in profile, with his head cupped in his hands, as if in prayer. Sw. Anand Prahlad, in his book Reggae Wisdom, suggested that on this and previous album Bush Doctor, Tosh was seeking to portray himself in the role of "healer and prophet".

The album peaked at number 6 in Italy, 17 in Germany, 25 in Austria, 27 in Sweden, 44 in the Netherlands, and at 123 on the Billboard 200.

The album was reissued in 2002 with five bonus tracks.

== Reception ==
Professional ratings
Review scores
Source	Rating
AllMusic	3/5 stars
Christgau's Record Guide	C+

Lester Bangs, reviewing the album for Rolling Stone, saw Mystic Man as an improvement over Bush Doctor and viewed the 9-minute disco-driven "Buk-in-Hamm Palace" as the album's strongest track. Jonathan Daümler-Ford, for the Birmingham Daily Post, thought it lacked the immediate impact of the previous album, but "sneaks up from behind" with what he described as "one of the best reggae tracks I have heard ("Can't You See") and several close contenders", calling it a "slow starter but a strong stayer". Ralph Heibutzki, for Allmusic, saw the album as Tosh reasserting his "cranky contrarian militancy", "a proud declaration of Tosh's lifestyle, which he pointedly contrasts against Western consumerist decadence", viewing "The Day the Dollar Die" as a roots reggae classic.

Dave Thompson saw the album as a disappointment, picking out "Jah Seh No" and "Rumours of War" as highlights. Village Voice critic Robert Christgau wrote: "Mysticism should keep its own counsel; boast about it, translate your supposed experience of the ineffable into any but the most simpleminded ideology, and ninety-five times out of a hundred you'll sound like a smug asshole. Tosh's ever more preachy vocal stance does nothing for his dopey puns ('shitty' for 'city,' far out), his confused political-economic theories, or his equation of hamburgers with heroin. And his musicians sound like the bored pros rockers so often turn into."

== Track listing ==
All tracks composed by Peter Tosh

1. "Mystic Man"
2. "Recruiting Soldiers"
3. "Can't You See"
4. "Jah Seh No"
5. "Fight On"
6. "Buk-In-Hamm Palace"
7. "The Day the Dollar Die"
8. "Crystal Ball"
9. "Rumours of War"

Bonus tracks on "The Definitive Remasters" 2002 EMI CD release

10. "Buk-In-Hamm Palace" (12" version)
11. "Mystic Man" (long version)
12. "Fight On" (instrumental)
13. "Recruiting Soldiers" (version)
14. "Dubbing Buk-In-Hamm" (from 12" single)

== Personnel ==
- Peter Tosh - lead vocals, guitar, keyboards
- Robbie Shakespeare - bass guitar
- Sly Dunbar - drums, percussion
- Mikey Chung - keyboards, guitar, percussion
- Robbie Lyn - organ, piano
- Uziah "Sticky" Thompson - percussion; repeater drums on "Fight On"
- George Young - alto saxophone, flute
- Howard Johnson - baritone saxophone
- Lou Marini - tenor saxophone, flute
- Ed Walsh - Oberheim synthesizer on "Recruiting Soldiers", "Jah Seh No" and "Buk-In-Hamm Palace"
- Barry Rogers - trombone
- Mike Lawrence - trumpet
- Sammy Figueroa - percussion; congas on "Mystic Man" and "Buk-In-Hamm Palace"
- Clive "Azul" Hunt, Mikey Chung - horn arrangements
- Brenda White King, Gwen Guthrie, The Tamlins, Yvonne Lewis - backing vocals
- Keith Sterling - acoustic piano on "Mystic Man"
- Ed Elizalde - lead guitar on "Can't You See"

Technical

- Geoffrey Chung - recording, mixing
- James Nichols, Michel Sauvage - assistant engineer
- Dennis King - mastering
- Annie Leibovitz - photography

== Charts ==
Chart (1979)	Peak position
Australia (Kent Music Report)	72
United States (Billboard 200)	104
