= Dubrising =

Studio album by Sly and Robbie
- Released: 2 December 2014
- Genre: Dub; reggae
- Length: 35:48
- Label: Tabou 1
- Producer: Guillaume Bougard; Sly and Robbie

Sly and Robbie chronology
Dubmaster Voyage (2014)	Dubrising (2014)

Dubrising is a studio album by Jamaican reggae rhythm section and production duo Sly and Robbie. Released on 2 December 2014 through Tabou 1 record label, the album features contributions from keyboardist Dan Donovan of Big Audio Dynamite and audio engineer Paul "Groucho" Smykle, marking their first collaboration in 30 years with the latter.

== Critical reception ==
Professional ratings
Review scores
Source	Rating
AllMusic	4/5 stars
Exclaim!	7/10

The album generally received positive reviews from music critics. AllMusic critic David Jeffries thought that the record "plays out cool and tasteful, like old friends who pick right up where they left off decades ago" and "deserves special attention from the dubheads, '80s heads, and the Uhuru faithful." Daniel Sylvester of Exclaim! wrote: "By incorporating modern sounds into their oeuvre, Sly & Robbie strive to stay relevant by weaving the past into the present."

== Track listing ==
1. "Satan Fall" – 5:27
2. "Freedom Ring" – 4:07
3. "Drone Snipers" – 3:46
4. "Bully Tactics" – 4:20
5. "To the Rescue" – 4:39
6. "No Surrender" – 4:45
7. "Flame Thrower" – 4:48
8. "Dub-ble Agent" – 3:56

== Personnel ==
Album personnel as adapted from album liner notes.

Musicians

- Robbie Shakespeare – bass, guitar, keyboards
- Sly Dunbar – drums, percussion
- Dalton Brownie – guitar
- Willie Lindo – guitar
- Darryl Thompson – guitar
- Mikey Chung – guitar
- Radcliffe "Dougie" Bryan – guitar
- Bunny McKenzie – harmonica
- Ansel Collins – keyboards
- Dan Donovan – keyboards
- Franklyn Waul – keyboards
- Robbie Lyn – keyboards
- Steven "Lenky" Marsden – keyboards
- Tyrone Downie – keyboards
- Wally Badarou – keyboards
- Skully Simms – percussion
- Uziah Thompson – percussion
- Dean Fraser – saxophone
- Stepper Briard – saxophone
- Ronald "Nambo" Robinson – trombone

Technical personnel

- Laurent Gudin – artwork
- Noah Kuang Hong – illustration
- Bruno Sourice – mastering
- Paul "Groucho" Smykle – mixing
- Guillaume Bougard – production
