= Mama Africa (Peter Tosh album) =

Studio album by Peter Tosh
- Released: 1983
- Recorded: 1982, 1983
- Genres: Reggae, pop
- Length: 44:11
- Labels: EMI America (U.S.); EMI (UK / International); Intel-Diplo (Jamaica)
- Producers: Chris Kimsey, Peter Tosh

Peter Tosh chronology
Wanted Dread & Alive (1980, 1981)	Mama Africa (1983)	No Nuclear War (1987)

Mama Africa is a studio album by the Jamaican musician Peter Tosh, released in 1983. It peaked at number 59 on the Billboard 200, becoming Tosh's highest-charting album in the U.S. Tosh supported the album with a North American tour. A video was shot for "Johnny B. Goode".

== Critical reception ==
Professional ratings
Review scores
Source	Rating
AllMusic	4.5/5 stars

The New York Times wrote: "Like most of Mr. Tosh's albums, Mama Africa is uneven—Mr. Tosh's raw baritone can be inexpressive—but in 'Glasshouse' and a few other songs Mr. Tosh shows both vehemence and a preacher's timing." The Globe and Mail determined that "Mama Africa has more snap rhythmically than anything he's done since Bush Doctor."

== Track listing ==
All tracks composed by Peter Tosh, except where indicated

1. "Mama Africa" - 7:56
2. "Glasshouse" - 5:52
3. "Not Gonna Give It Up" - 5:48
4. "Stop That Train" - 4:02
5. "Johnny B. Goode" (Chuck Berry) - 4:04
6. "Where You Gonna Run" (Donald Kinsey) - 4:09
7. "Peace Treaty" - 4:21
8. "Feel No Way" - 3:31
9. "Maga Dog" - 4:30

== Personnel ==
- Peter Tosh – lead and backing vocals, clavinet
- Leebert "Gibby" Morrison, Robbie Shakespeare – bass guitar
- Carlton "Santa" Davis, Sly Dunbar – drums
- Geoffrey Chung, Lancelot "Maxie" McKenzie – engineer
- Darryl Thompson, Donald Kinsey, Ed Edizalde – lead guitar
- Mikey Chung, Steve Golding – rhythm guitar
- Byron Allred, Peter Couch – keyboards
- Robert Lyn – organ (tracks: A1 to A4, B3 to B5)
- Skully, Uziah "Sticky" Thompson – percussion
- Keith Sterling – piano
- Dean Fraser – saxophone
- Ronald "Nambo" Robinson – trombone
- Arnold Brackenridge, David Madden, Junior "Chico" Chin – trumpet
- Jon Paris – harmonica
- Audrey Hall, Betty Wright, Donald Kinsey, Dorett Myers, Pam Hall, Raymond Hall, the Tamlins – backing vocals

Technical

- Chris Kimsey, Peter Tosh – mixing
- John "Jellybean" Benitez – mixing on "Johnny B. Goode"

== Charts ==
Chart (1983)	Peak position
Australia (Kent Music Report)	47
US Billboard 200	59
