= No Nuclear War =

Studio album by Peter Tosh
- Released: 1987
- Genre: Reggae
- Length: 39:34
- Label: EMI
- Producers: Peter Tosh, Marlene Tosh

Peter Tosh chronology
Mama Africa (1983)	No Nuclear War (1987)

No Nuclear War is the seventh and final studio album by the Jamaican musician Peter Tosh, released in 1987. Tosh was murdered shortly after its release; he had returned to Jamaica after meetings in New York City to discuss the lack of promotion for the album. Tosh was also upset that, despite the language in his contract with EMI Records, the album had been released in South Africa. Before recording No Nuclear War, Tosh had spent four years protesting elements of his record contract.

The album received a Grammy Award for Best Reggae Album in 1988.

== Critical reception ==
Professional ratings
Review scores
Source	Rating
AllMusic	2/5 stars
The Encyclopedia of Popular Music	3/5 stars
Los Angeles Times	2/4 stars
The Rolling Stone Album Guide	3.5/5 stars

The Sun-Sentinel wrote that the "musicians create a lush backdrop for Tosh to address universal concerns about such topical issues as apartheid and nuclear holocaust." The Los Angeles Times noted that the "singing is spirited and expressive, but the songwriting is suspect—Tosh seems to have run out of the vivid imagery that originally made his pointed social commentaries noteworthy." The Boston Globe concluded that "rarely has a singer of any genre stuck so firmly to his beliefs for so long."

The Omaha World-Herald determined that "Tosh's mix of parody and spirituality is refreshing, although his latest album is more of a gentle nudge than a full-fledged call to arms." The Times opined that "songs about apartheid, nuclear war/peace and religious zeal are rapidly becoming the hackneyed rasta equivalents of such rock'n'roll stand-bys as cars, girls and life on the road."

== Track listing ==
All tracks are written by Peter Tosh.

No.	Title	Length
1.	"No Nuclear War"	7:57
2.	"Nah Goa Jail"	4:45
3.	"Fight Apartheid"	5:02
4.	"Vampire"	3:33
5.	"In My Song"	4:16
6.	"Lesson in My Life"	3:58
7.	"Testify"	5:36
8.	"Come Together"	4:26

Bonus track on "The Definitive Remasters" (2002 EMI CD release)
No.	Title	Length
9.	"No Nuclear War (Single Version)"	3:32

== Personnel ==
- Peter Tosh – lead vocals, rhythm guitar, keyboards, backing vocals, horn arrangements
- Daniel “Danny AxeMan” Thompson, George "Fully" Fulwood, Leebert "Gibby" Morrison – bass guitar
- Carlton "Santa" Davis – drums
- Steve Golding – rhythm guitar
- Keith Sterling, Tyrone Downie – keyboards
- Scully Sims, Uziah "Sticky" Thompson – percussion
- David Madden, Dean Fraser, Junior "Chico" Chin, Ronald "Nambo" Robinson – horns
- Cynthia Schloss, June Lodge, Nadine Sutherland, Pam Hall, Ruddy Thomas – backing vocals

Technical

- Dennis Thompson, Peter Tosh – mixing
- Neville Garrick – cover illustration
- Adrian Boot – photography

== Charts ==
Weekly chart performance for No Nuclear War
Chart (2025)	Peak position
Hungarian Physical Albums (MAHASZ)	22
