= Word, Sound and Power =

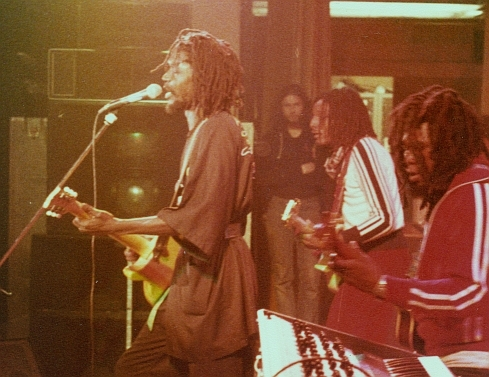
Peter Tosh, Al Anderson, and Robbie Shakespeare, Bush Doctor tour 1978

Word, Sound and Power are a Jamaican reggae band, formed in 1976 as Peter Tosh's backing band after Tosh left The Wailers.

== History ==
It is believed that each word in the name stood for parts of the ensemble, Word – vocals, Sound – guitars, and Power – percussion. It is also a Rastafarian concept regarding the power of words.

Word, Sound and Power toured with Tosh in America in 1976, Europe in 1978 and 1979, and backed him at the One Love Peace Concert in Kingston, Jamaica. For this concert, their line-out was Sly and Robbie, Al Anderson, Mikey Chung, Robbie Lyn, Keith Sterling, Uziah Thompson and Noel Simms.

Carlton "Santa" Davis (drums) and George "Fully" Fullwood (bass) replaced Sly and Robbie, when they began touring with Black Uhuru (Mykal Rose, Duckie Simpson and Puma Jones).

Although the band has switched in and out of members fairly consistently throughout the years, the band generally consisted of Sly and Robbie, Mikey Chung, Keith Sterling, Robbie Lyn, and male background singers The Tamlins and three other unnamed female background singers.

From around 1978 through 1981, the role of the lead guitar would change several times with Darryl Thompson and Al Anderson. In 1978, Keith Richards took the role during the recording of the 1978 album Bush Doctor.

Although Sly and Robbie had mostly been a duo throughout their career with Peter Tosh, in 1977, Carlton Barrett took the drumming role for the 1977 album Equal Rights, although Sly had played another album the year before, Legalize It.

Notable people such as Rita Marley (Legalize It), Glimmer Twins (The Rolling Stones) and Bunny Wailer (Wailers) trio have joined in to perform in the Word, Sound and Power band occasionally. Keyboardist/pianist Robbie Lyn often did not appear at Tosh's shows and recording sessions.

In 1981, notable members of Tosh's band such as Sly and Robbie backed out on performing with him after a lack of payments as well as Tosh's short temper when Sly began to play the drums during one of Tosh's shows. Due to this, Sly and Robbie left the band in 1981 shortly after the start of the Wanted, Dread And Alive tour and album release, and focused on touring with Black Uhuru. Due to this, regarding Mikey Chung's earlier affiliations with Black Uhuru and Sly and Robbie, he also joined the duo and left the band as well. In the same year, Tosh had personal arguments with Keith Richards regarding his house and left the Glimmer Twins, and stopped affiliating with the Rolling Stones after leaving the label shortly after the release of the Wanted, Dread and Alive album. Darryl Thompson and Al Anderson also stopped affiliating with the band.

Shortly after, from late 1981–1983, and then again shortly before Tosh's death in 1987, Carlton Davis joined the leading drumming role including Aston Barrett as the leading bassist role, on the Wanted, Dread and Alive tour, as well as the album and tour of Mama Africa, and the album No Nuclear War.
