= Wanted Dread & Alive =

Studio album by Peter Tosh
- Released: June 1981
- Recorded: 1981
- Studios: Dynamic, Kingston, Jamaica
- Genre: Reggae
- Labels: Rolling Stones Records; EMI America; Capitol
- Producer: Peter Tosh

Peter Tosh chronology
Mystic Man (1979)	Wanted Dread & Alive (1981)	Mama Africa (1983)

"Reggaemylitis"
Reggaemylitis audio sample

Wanted Dread & Alive is the fifth studio album by the Jamaican reggae musician Peter Tosh. It was released in 1981 in two different versions, one for Jamaica and the USA (EMI America) and one for Europe (Rolling Stones Records). It was reissued by Capitol in 2002, with bonus tracks. The lead single was the duet with the American singer Gwen Guthrie, "Nothing but Love".

The album peaked at No. 91 on the Billboard 200.

== Critical reception ==
Professional ratings
Review scores
Source	Rating
AllMusic	3/5 stars
Robert Christgau	B
The Encyclopedia of Popular Music	3/5 stars
The New Rolling Stone Record Guide	4/5 stars

The New York Times deemed the album "a mixed bag of political sloganeering, Rastafarian cant and reggae-pop". The Globe and Mail thought that "the title cut maintains the outlaw pose with music that easily makes the grade, but lyrics that betray Tosh's penchant for recycling old imagery".

The New Rolling Stone Record Guide wrote that it contains "some of the best Sly and Robbie playing ever".

== Impact ==
"Oh Bumbo Klaat" was partially responsible for popularizing the Jamaican swear word Bomboclat.

== Track listing ==
All tracks composed by Peter Tosh except where indicated.

=== EMI America and Jamaica (SO-17055) ===
Side 1

1. "Coming in Hot"
2. "Nothing but Love" (Ella Mitchell, Freddie Harris)
3. "Reggae-Mylitis"
4. "The Poor Man Feel It"
5. "Cold Blood"

Side 2

1. "Wanted Dread & Alive"
2. "Rastafari Is"
3. "That's What They Will Do"
4. "Fools Die"

=== Rolling Stones Records (1A 062-64378) ===
Side 1

1. "Coming in Hot"
2. "Nothing but Love" (Ella Mitchell, Freddie Harris)
3. "Reggaemylitis"
4. "Rok with Me" (Jean Watt)
5. "Oh Bumbo Klaat"

Side 2

1. "Wanted Dread and Alive"
2. "Rastafari Is"
3. "Guide Me from My Friends"
4. "Fools Die"

=== Capitol 2002 reissue (37693) ===
1. "Coming in Hot"
2. "Nothing but Love"
3. "Reggaemylitis"
4. "Rok with Me"
5. "Oh Bumbo Klaat"
6. "Wanted Dread and Alive"
7. "Rastafari Is"
8. "Guide Me from My Friends"
9. "Fools Die (For Want of Wisdom)"
10. "The Poor Man Feel It"
11. "Cold Blood"
12. "That's What They Will Do"
13. "Rok with Me" (Alternative Long Mix)
14. "Nothing but Love" (Long Version)
15. "In a Milan"

== Personnel ==
- Peter Tosh - lead vocals, backing vocals, guitar, keyboards, percussion
- The Tamlins - backing vocals
- Robbie Shakespeare - bass guitar
- Sly Dunbar - drums
- Pee Wee Walters - flute
- Darryl Thompson - lead guitar
- Mikey Chung - rhythm guitar
- Keith Sterling, Robbie Lyn - keyboards
- Gwen Guthrie - lead vocals on "Nothing but Love"
- Noel "Scully" Simms, Uziah "Sticky" Thompson - percussion
- Dean Fraser - tenor and alto saxophone
- Ronald "Nambo" Robinson - trombone
- Barry Rogers, Jon Faddis, Lew Soloff, Lou Marini - horns on "Nothing but Love"

Technical

- Geoffrey Chung - recording, mixing
