= Throw Down Your Arms =

Studio album by Sinéad O'Connor
- Released: 4 October 2005
- Recorded: 2004
- Studios: Tuff Gong Studios and Anchor Studios in Kingston, Jamaica
- Genre: Reggae
- Length: 47:27
- Labels: Chocolate and Vanilla
- Producer: Sly and Robbie

Sinéad O'Connor chronology
Collaborations (2005)	Throw Down Your Arms (2005)	Theology (2007)

Professional ratings
Aggregate scores
Source	Rating
Metacritic	69/100
Review scores
Source	Rating
AllMusic	3.5/5 stars
Blender	3/5 stars
Entertainment Weekly	B
The Guardian	3/5 stars
Mojo	4/5 stars
Paste	5/10
Pitchfork	6.8/10
Rolling Stone	3.5/5 stars
Uncut	3.5/5 stars
Under the Radar	6/10

Throw Down Your Arms is the seventh studio album by Sinéad O'Connor, also known as her reggae album. O'Connor sings cover versions of classic roots reggae songs, with production by Sly and Robbie.

The album was recorded in Kingston, Jamaica at Tuff Gong Studios and Anchor Studios in 2004 and released by Chocolate and Vanilla on 4 October 2005. In her memoir Rememberings, O'Connor said that she felt so strongly about making Throw Down Your Arms that she personally paid $400,000 of her own money for the record's production. 10 per cent of the profits went to support Rastafari elders in Jamaica.

The album contains a cover of the Bob Marley song "War", which O'Connor famously performed on Saturday Night Live in 1992 while ripping up a photo of Pope John Paul II.

The cover art depicts a photograph of O'Connor in the dress and veil she wore at her First Holy Communion as a child.

== Track listing ==
Disc 1 track listing
No.	Title	Originally recorded by	Length
1.	"Jah Nuh Dead"	Burning Spear in 1978 (as "Marcus Say Jah No Dead")	3:20
2.	"Marcus Garvey"	Burning Spear in 1975	3:28
3.	"Door Peep"	Burning Spear in 1976	3:22
4.	"He Prayed"	Burning Spear in 1973	3:27
5.	"Y Mas Gan"	The Abyssinians in 1969	3:49
6.	"Curly Locks"	Junior Byles in 1974	4:22
7.	"Vampire"	Devon Irons in 1976	4:02
8.	"Prophet Has Arise"	Israel Vibration in 1978	4:26
9.	"Downpressor Man"	Peter Tosh in 1977	5:08
10.	"Throw Down Your Arms"	Burning Spear in 1977	4:02
11.	"Untold Stories"	Buju Banton in 1995	3:40
12.	"War"	Bob Marley & The Wailers in 1976	4:04
Total length:			47:27

Japanese CD release bonus tracks
No.	Title	Originally recorded by	Length
13.	"Move Out of Babylon"	Johnny Clarke in 1974	3:17
14.	"Abendigo"	The Abyssinians in 1969	3:53
15.	"Jah Can Count on I"	Little Roy in 1975	3:28

Disc 2 (Dub versions) track listing
No.	Title	Length
1.	"Intro" (Micah 4:1-5)	0:57
2.	"Jah Nuh Dead"	3:12
3.	"Marcus Garvey"	3:29
4.	"Door Peep"	3:19
5.	"He Prayed"	3:28
6.	"Y Mas Gan"	3:51
7.	"Curly Locks"	4:17
8.	"Vampire"	4:01
9.	"Prophet Has Arise"	4:24
10.	"Downpressor Man"	5:07
11.	"Throw Down Your Arms"	4:12
12.	"Untold Stories"	3:42
13.	"War"	4:04
Total length:		48:09

Note:

- Sinéad O'Connor cover of "Downpressor Man" is closer to Peter Tosh recording made in 1977. But the song was previously recorded three other times by Peter Tosh with The Wailers: "Sinner Man" (1966, produced by Coxsone Dodd), "Downpresser" (1971, produced by Lee Perry) and "Oppressor Man" (1972, produced by Peter Tosh).
- The cover of "Marcus Say Jah No Dead" is closer to Burning Spear's a cappella version featured on the Rockers soundtrack.
- A few other reggae covers were done by Sinéad O'Connor when she was touring to promote the album, such as "Rivers Of Babylon" (by The Melodians), "None A Jah Jah Children No Cry" (by Ras Michael & The Sons Of Negus), "Keep Cool Babylon" (by Ras Michael & The Sons Of Negus), "Stepping Razor" and "Creation" (by Peter Tosh).

== Personnel ==
- Sinéad O'Connor – vocals, low whistle
- Sly Dunbar – drums
- Robbie Shakespeare – bass guitar
- Mikey Chung – lead guitar
- Dalton Brownie – rhythm guitar
- Glen Brownie – acoustic guitar on "Untold Stories"
- Robbie Lyn – keyboards, Hammond organ
- Carol "Bowie" McLaughlin – piano
- Steven "Lenkky" Marsden – piano on "Curly Locks"
- Uziah "Sticky" Thompson – percussion
- Dean Fraser – saxophone
- David Madden – trumpet
- Pam Hall, Keisha Patterson, Katrina Harley – backing vocals

== Charts ==
Chart performance for Throw Down Your Arms
Chart (2005)	Peak position
Australian Albums (ARIA)	200
Belgian Albums (Ultratop Flanders)	67
French Albums (SNEP)	26
Irish Albums (IRMA)	17
Italian Albums (FIMI)	73
US Independent Albums (Billboard)	36
US Reggae Albums (Billboard)	4
UK Independent Albums (Official Charts)	24

== Certifications ==
Certifications for Throw Down Your Arms
Region	Certification	Certified units/sales
Ireland (IRMA)	Gold	7,500^{^}
^{^} Shipments figures based on certification alone.
