= Foul Play (album) =

Studio album by Dennis Brown
- Released: 1981
- Studio: Joe Gibbs Studio, Kingston, Jamaica
- Genre: Reggae
- Label: A&M
- Producer: Clive Hunt, Joe Gibbs

Dennis Brown chronology
Spellbound (1981)	Foul Play (1981)	Love Has Found Its Way (1982)

Professional ratings
Review scores
Source	Rating
Allmusic	4/5 stars

Foul Play is a 1981 album by reggae singer Dennis Brown, the first of three albums to be released as part of his international record deal with A&M. The album features two tracks which have been described as "two of the greatest roots cuts in major label history", in "The Existence of Jah" and "The World is Troubled". The album was reissued on the Joe Gibbs label as a double-set with its follow-up, Love Has Found Its Way, and with both of the other A&M albums on the double-CD set The Complete A&M Years. The album mixed roots reggae tracks and sociopolitical themes with love songs such as "If I Had The World", "Your Man", and a new version of one of his early hits, "If I Follow My Heart". Klive Walker, in his book Dubwise: Reasoning from the Reggae Underground suggested that the lyric of "If I Had the World" ("You drive away the pains from me, sometimes you're like cocaine, baby") suggests that Brown was already using cocaine at the time that the album was recorded.

== Track listing ==
All tracks composed by Dennis Brown; except where indicated

1. "On The Rocks" (Clive Hunt)
2. "The Existence of Jah"
3. "Come On Baby" (Clive Hunt)
4. "The World is Troubled"
5. "I Need Your Love"
6. "Foul Play" (Joe Gibson)
7. "Your Man"
8. "If I Had the World"
9. "If I Follow My Heart"
10. "The Cheater"

== Personnel ==
- Dennis Brown - vocals
- Willie Lindo - lead guitar
- Noel Bailey - rhythm guitar
- Lloyd Parks, Robbie Shakespeare - bass guitar
- Clive Hunt, Franklyn "Bubbler" Waul, Robbie Lyn - keyboards
- Sly Dunbar, Devon Richardson - drums
- Dean Fraser, Ronald "Nambo" Robinson, David Madden - horns
- Ruddy Thomas, Uziah "Sticky" Thompson - percussion
- The Professionals - backing vocals

Technical

- Errol Thompson - engineer, mixing
- Larry Maxwell - executive producer
- Aaron Rapoport - photography
