= Humanitarian (album) =

Studio album by Jimmy Cliff
- Released: April 23, 1999 (France), June 22, 1999 (US)
- Genre: Reggae
- Length: 59:04
- Label: Globe Music (France), Eureka (US)
- Producer: Jimmy Cliff; Sly Dunbar; Clive "Azul" Hunt; Daniel Lanois; Pete Rock; Handel Tucker

Jimmy Cliff chronology
Higher & Higher (1998)	Humanitarian (1999)	Fantastic Plastic People (2002)

Professional ratings
Review scores
Source	Rating
Allmusic	2/5 stars

Humanitarian is a 1999 album by Jimmy Cliff.

AllMusic commented, "Infused with pretty world sounds and mannered singing, Humanitarian succeeds only when it sticks firmly to its roots".

== Track listing ==
All tracks composed by Jimmy Cliff; except where indicated

1. "Humanitarian" – 4:17
2. "Rise Up" – 3:54
3. "Giants" 4:43
4. "Come up to My Love" 3:58
5. "How Long" 3:59
6. "Let's Jam" 4:37
7. "Keep the Family" 4:07
8. "Drifters" 4:14
9. "The Hill" 4:59
10. "I Walk With Love" 4:12
11. "I'm in All" 3:49
12. "Humanitarian" [Slow] 4:07
13. "Ob-La-Di, Ob-La-Da" [*] – 3:04 (John Lennon, Paul McCartney)
14. "You've Got a Friend" [*] – 5:04 (Carole King)

== Personnel ==
- Jimmy Cliff - lead guitar, acoustic guitar, percussion, keyboards, backing vocals
- Wayne Armond — guitar, backing vocals
- Aston Barrett — bass guitar
- Noel "Bunny" Brown — backing vocals
- Cleveland "Clevie" Browne — drums
- Dalton Browne — guitar
- Danny Browne — bass guitar
- Junior "Chico" Chin — horn
- Ansel Collins — keyboards
- Cat Coore — guitar
- Tyrone Downie — harmonica, keyboards
- Sly Dunbar — drums
- Jennifer Edwards — backing vocals
- Michael Fletcher — bass guitar
- Sharon Forrester — backing vocals
- Dean Fraser — horn, saxophone
- Brian Gold — backing vocals
- Tony Gold — backing vocals
- Marcia Griffiths — backing vocals
- Paul Hall — background vocals
- Prilly Hamilton — background vocals
- Clive "Azul" Hunt — keyboards
- Daniel Lanois — mandolin
- J.C. Lodge — backing vocals
- Robert Lyn — keyboards
- Rita Marley — backing vocals
- Judy Mowatt — backing vocals
- Benjy Myaz — bass guitar
- Benjamin Myers — bass guitar
- Ronald "Nambo" Robinson — horn
- Stan Ryck — backing vocals
- Robbie Shakespeare — bass guitar
- Chris "Sky Juice" Blake — percussion
- Handel Tucker — keyboards
- Michael Wallace — keyboards, backing vocals
- Franklyn Waul — keyboards
- Lloyd "Gitsy" Willis — guitar, mandolin
