= Wolf & Leopards =

Wolf and Leopards

Studio album by Dennis Brown
- Released: 1977
- Recorded: 1976–77
- Genre: Reggae
- Label: DEB/Weed Beat
- Producer: Winston "Niney" Holness, Dennis Brown, Castro Brown

Dennis Brown chronology
Westbound Train (1977)	Wolf and Leopards (1977)	Visions of Dennis Brown (1978)

Professional ratings
Review scores
Source	Rating
AllMusic	3.5/5 stars
Music Week	2/4 stars

Wolf and Leopards (later issued as Wolves and Leopards) is a 1977 reggae album by Dennis Brown.

== Recording ==
Recorded between 1976 and 1977 and released on Brown's own DEB label in the UK and on the Weed Beat label in Jamaica, the album comprises ten tracks originally released on singles that concentrate on cultural themes and mark the transformation of Brown from child star to full-fledged Rastaman. Several of the tracks were produced by Winston "Niney" Holness, with two of the key tracks, "Wolf and Leopards" and "Here I Come", co-produced by Lee "Scratch" Perry at his Black Ark studio, along with another track "In Zion", which was omitted from the album. The rhythms for these had been recorded at Randy's studio, and they were voiced and mixed at the Black Ark. "Wolf and Leopards", which criticizes criminals who posed as Rastafari as cover for their activities, was co-written by Brown, Holness and Perry (mostly by Perry according to Holness, and it was credited to Perry on its Observer Records single release), "Here I Come" was, according to Holness, written by him when he was in his twenties, and Holness also sang harmony vocals on it. The tracks on this album were among the last that Brown recorded with Holness before moving on to work with Joe Gibbs. The track was mixed by Errol Thompson. The remainder of the tracks were self-produced by Brown or by his DEB Music associate Castro Brown. The album was described in Steve Barrow and Peter Dalton's The Rough Guide to Reggae as "a benchmark album for the roots era".

== Release history ==
The album was first issued on Brown's DEB label in the UK and on Weed Beat in Jamaica. It was later issued on the Joe Gibbs and Blue Moon labels, and was released in expanded CD form in 2006 by VP Records.

== Track listing ==
All tracks are written by Dennis Brown except where noted

No.	Title	Writer(s)	Length
1.	"Wolves and Leopards"		2:44
2.	"Emmanuel"		3:49
3.	"Here I Come"		2:58
4.	"Whip Them Jah Jah"	Brown, Scott	2:34
5.	"Created by the Father"		2:40
6.	"Party Time"		3:20
7.	"Rain From The Sky (Rolling Down)"		4:26
8.	"Boasting"		3:46
9.	"Children of Israel"		3:10
10.	"Lately Girl"		2:08

2006 reissue bonus tracks
No.	Title	Length
11.	"By the Foot of the Mountain"	2:53
12.	"(Brother) Stop the Fussing & Fighting"	4:20
13.	"Breaking Down the Barriers"	3:17

== Personnel ==
- Dennis Brown - vocals
- Sly Dunbar - drums
- Dean Fraser - saxophone
- Willie Lindo - guitar
- David Madden - trumpet
- Ronald "Nambo" Robinson - trombone
- Lloyd Parks - bass
- Errol Thompson - engineer
- Franklyn "Bubbler" Waul - piano
- Winston Wright - organ
- Nigel Molden - Executive Producer
