= Ruddy Thomas =

Jamaican reggae singer

- Born: 12 July 1951
- Origin: Jamaica
- Died: 10 June 2006 (aged 54) Port Antonio, Jamaica
- Genres: Roots Reggae, Lovers Rock
- Instrument: Vocals

Ruddy Thomas aka Flick Wilson (12 July 1951 – 10 June 2006) was a Jamaican reggae singer, musician, and recording engineer, who had his greatest successes as a singer in the late 1970s and early 1980s with lovers rock songs. Thomas also performed as a conscious roots reggae artist under the name Flick Wilson, singing in a higher register falsetto tone, recording meditative, cultural spiritual music at Clement "Coxsone" Dodd's Studio One, also cutting an album with Roots Radics, engineered by Scientist (musician).

== Biography ==
Thomas worked for producer Joe Gibbs in the 1970s, running and arranging recording sessions, and providing percussion and backing vocals. He recorded several singles for Gibbs, including "Every Day Is a Holiday", "Let's Make a Baby" and a version of Dobby Dobson's "Loving Pauper". Thomas's version of "Loving Pauper" was the number one song of the year on the 1978 RJR Top 100. He had a number one reggae hit in the United Kingdom in 1981 with "Just One Moment Away". In 1983, he recorded the duet "(You Know How to Make Me) Feel So Good" with Susan Cadogan, which topped the reggae charts and was followed in 1984 by another duet with Cadogan, "Only Heaven Can Wait", and an album. Thomas also recorded duets with J.C. Lodge ("Time for Love"), Marcia Aitken ("The Closer I Get to You"), Pam Hall ("You Can't Hide") and Cynthia Schloss ("Don't Want to Lose You", "How Can I Let You Get Away", and "There Is a Fire").

Thomas provided backing vocals on several albums, including Peter Tosh's No Nuclear War. He was also part of the horn section on Cornell Campbell's 1982 album What's Happening To Me.

Thomas later joined Tommy Cowan's Talent Corporation roster.

Thomas also acted as recording engineer on many releases by the likes of Boris Gardiner, Leroy Smart, Sugar Minott, The Wailing Souls, Beres Hammond, Dennis Brown, Frankie Paul, and Dean Fraser. He was also credited with co-producing the 1982 album Superstar Yellowman Has Arrived With Toyan.

He died after suffering a heart attack while performing at the Popular Song Contest Street Blocker at Port Antonio, Portland, Jamaica.

== Discography ==
=== Albums ===
- First Time Around (Joe Gibbs Music, 1981)
- Reggae By Ruddy Thomas (Friends Records, 1983)
- When I've Got You (Hawkeye, 1983)
- The Very Best of Ruddy Thomas (Mobiliser, 1983)
- Ruddy Thomas and Susan Cadogan (with Susan Cadogan)
- Don't Want to Lose You (World Enterprise, 1987)
- Time for Love (C & E Records, 1989)
- Long Lost Lover (TekTwo, 1990)
- Greatest Hits (Rhino, 1997)
- Sings Bob Marley (Disky, 1997)
- Sweet Lovers Rock (P-Vine Japan, 2003)
