= Mikey Chung =

Jamaican musician (1950–2021)

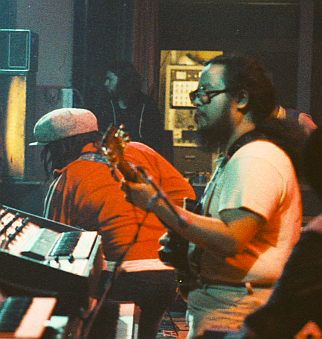
- Chung, on tour with Peter Tosh (1978)

Background information
- Also known as: Mao
- Born: Michael Chung; 1950; Christiana, Jamaica
- Origin: Kingston, Jamaica
- Died: 28 December 2021 (aged 71) Kingston, Jamaica
- Genres: Reggae
- Instruments: Keyboard, guitar
- Formerly of: Black Uhuru

Michael Chung (1950 – 28 December 2021) also known as Mao Chung, was a Jamaican musician who played keyboards, guitar and percussion instruments. He was also an arranger and record producer of Jamaican music, and worked with a wide array of musicians, notably Lee Perry and Sly and Robbie.

== Life and career ==
Chung was born in Christiana, Jamaica, in 1950. He was of Chinese Jamaican descent, and grew up on Tewari Crescent in Kingston, Jamaica. He later moved with his family to the Vineyard Town area of the city, attending St. George's College. He began his career in music as the guitarist for the Mighty Mystics, The Virtues (1967–69), Generation Gap, and the Federal Studios house band the Now Generation Band, before playing with artists such as Jacob Miller and Inner Circle in the 1970s. As a member of Word, Sound and Power from 1978, along with Sly & Robbie, he backed Peter Tosh on Mystic Man, Wanted Dread and Alive, and Bush Doctor, playing guitar and synthesizer. He played for Lee Perry's band The Upsetters (?-1975?-?), and the Compass Point All Stars (Island Records). He often accompanied Sly Dunbar and Robbie Shakespeare on their recordings and played guitar for Black Uhuru on their albums Anthem, Red and Chill Out.

He worked with many Jamaican and international artists, including Maxi Priest, Grace Jones, the Rolling Stones, Serge Gainsbourg, Bette Midler, Big Mountain, Art Ensemble of Chicago, James Brown, Garnett Silk, Joe Cocker and Sinéad O'Connor.

Chung was the brother of keyboardist/producer Geoffrey Chung, and had one daughter, Katharine. He died from myeloma in Kingston, Jamaica on 28 December 2021, at the age of 71.

== Collaborations ==
With Grace Jones

- Warm Leatherette (Island Records, 1980)
- Nightclubbing (Island Records, 1981)
- Living My Life (Island Records, 1982)
- Hurricane (PIAS Recordings, 2008)

With Peter Tosh

- Equal Rights (EMI, 1977)
- Bush Doctor (EMI, 1978)
- Mystic Man (EMI, 1979)
- Wanted Dread & Alive (Capitol Records, 1981)
- Mama Africa (EMI, 1983)

With Joe Cocker

- Sheffield Steel (Island Records, 1982)

With Sinéad O'Connor

- Throw Down Your Arms (Chocolate and Vanilla, 2005)

With Island Head

- Punky Reggae Party (Island Head, 2012)
