= Visions of Dennis Brown =

Studio album by Dennis Brown
- Released: 1978
- Recorded: 1978
- Genre: Reggae
- Label: Laser/Lightning/Joe Gibbs
- Producer: Joe Gibbs

Dennis Brown chronology
Wolf & Leopards (1978)	Visions of Dennis Brown (1978)	Joseph's Coat Of Many Colours (1979)

Professional ratings
Review scores
Source	Rating
AllMusic	3/5 stars

Visions of Dennis Brown is a 1978 conscious roots reggae album by Dennis Brown.

== Recording ==
The album was the first to come out of Brown's second stint with producer Joe Gibbs, with whom he would have his breakthrough international success, and the album played a major part in establishing the dominant position of both Brown and Gibbs in late 1970s reggae. The album mixes roots reggae themes such as economic hardship, African oppression, religion, and politics, with lovers rock material ("Love Me Always") and a cover version of Ray Charles' "This Little Girl of Mine". The album was engineered by Errol Thompson and features veteran musicians Bobby Ellis (trumpet), Vin Gordon (trombone), Herman Marquis (alto saxophone), and Tommy McCook (tenor saxophone).

== Release history ==
The album was originally released in 1978 on the Lightning, Laser, and Joe Gibbs labels. It was reissued on JGML in 1980 and issued for the first time on compact disc in 1989 by Shanachie Records. It was reissued in expanded form in 2006 on the Joe Gibbs Europe label, and reissued again in 2007 on the VP Records subsidiary 17 North Parade.

== Track listing ==
No.	Title	Writer(s)	Length
1.	"Deliverance Will Come"	Brown	3:26
2.	"Oh Mother"	Brown	4:23
3.	"Love Me Always/Angolan Chant"	Addeo, Leroy Sibbles	6:47
4.	"Concrete Castle King"	Lloyd "Gitsy" Willis	3:36
5.	"Malcolm X"	Winston McAnuff	3:14
6.	"Repatriation/Jubilation Dub"	Brown, Errol Thompson	6:08
7.	"Jah Can Do It"	Brown	3:00
8.	"Milk and Honey"	Brown, Clive Hunt	2:46
9.	"Stay at Home/Natty on Top"	Brown, Robinson, Errol Thompson (audio engineer)	5:23
10.	"Say What You Say/Money Honey"	Eric "Monty" Morris, Lloyd	7:28

2006 reissue bonus tracks
No.	Title	Length
11.	"Home Sweet Home"
12.	"I'm Coming Home"
13.	"Stop The Fussing And Fighting"
14.	"To The Foundation"

== Personnel ==
- Vocals: Dennis Brown
- Drums: Sly Dunbar
- Bass: Lloyd Parks
- Guitar: Eric Lamont, Robbie Shakespeare, Lennox Gordon
- Keyboards: Franklyn "Bubbler" Waul, Errol Nelson, Harold Butler
- Alto Saxophone: Herman Marquis
- Trombone: Vin Gordon
- Tenor Saxophone: Tommy McCook
- Trumpet: Bobby Ellis
- Percussion: Uziah "Sticky" Thompson
- Errol Thompson - arranger
