= Equal Rights (album) =

Studio album by Peter Tosh
- Released: 1977
- Studio: Dynamic Sounds, Kingston, Jamaica
- Genre: Reggae
- Length: 38:53
- Label: Columbia; EMI
- Producer: Peter Tosh

Peter Tosh chronology
Legalize It (1976)	Equal Rights (1977)	Bush Doctor (1978)

"Downpressor Man"
Downpressor Man audio sample

Equal Rights is the second studio album by Peter Tosh. It was released in 1977 on Columbia Records.

== Content ==
The song "Get Up, Stand Up", which was co-written by Bob Marley, was originally a single by Tosh's previous band, the Wailers, from their 1973 album Burnin'. "Downpressor Man" is a cover of "Sinner Man". "I Am that I Am" refers to a religious concept commonly referred to by that phrase.

== Critical reception ==
Professional ratings
Review scores
Source	Rating
AllMusic	4.5/5 stars
Christgau's Record Guide	B+
The Rolling Stone Album Guide	4/5 stars

The New York Times considered "Stepping Razor" one of the best songs of the year, calling it "infectious, urgent music, brilliant lyrics and an inherent sense of drama equal to the great punk anthems of the past."

== Track listing ==
All songs composed and arranged by Peter Tosh except as shown.

Side 1

1. "Get Up, Stand Up" – 3:29 (Tosh, Bob Marley)
2. "Downpressor Man" – 6:25
3. "I Am That I Am" – 4:28
4. "Stepping Razor" (Joe Higgs; credited to Tosh) – 5:47

Side 2

1. "Equal Rights" – 5:58
2. "African" – 3:41
3. "Jah Guide" – 4:29
4. "Apartheid" – 5:31

Track listing on "The Definitive Remasters" 2002 EMI CD release

1. "Get Up, Stand Up"
2. "Downpressor Man"
3. "I Am That I Am"
4. "Stepping Razor"
5. "Equal Rights"
6. "African"
7. "Jah Guide"
8. "Apartheid"
9. "400 Years"
10. "Hammer" (Extended Version)
11. "Jah Man Inna Jamdung"
12. "Vampire"
13. "Babylon Queendom"
14. "You Can't Blame the Youth"
15. "(Know) Dem a Wicked"
16. "Pound Get a Blow"
17. "Stop That Train"
18. "Get Up Stand Up" (Long Version)
19. "Equal Rights" (Extended Long Version)
20. "I Am That I Am" (Long Version)
21. "Apartheid" (Long Version)
22. "Stepping Razor" (Alternative Long Version)
23. "Get Up Stand Up" (Alternate Version)
24. "Pick Myself Up" (Live)
25. "African" (Live)
- Tracks 1–8 originally issued April 1977 as Equal Rights
- Tracks 9–17 previously unreleased original session outtakes
- Tracks 18–23 previously unreleased original session alternatives and long versions
- Tracks 24–25 recorded on 1982 US tour

== Personnel ==
- Peter Tosh - vocals, guitar, keyboards
- Bunny Wailer - backing vocals
- Sly Dunbar - drums
- Carlton "Carly" Barrett - drums ("African", "Jah Guide")
- Earl "Wya" Lindo - keyboards
- Donald Kinsey - guitar, backing vocals
- Robbie Shakespeare - bass
- Mikey Chung - lead guitar
- Al Anderson - lead guitar
- Robert Lyn - organ
- Keith Sterling - keyboards
- Harold Butler - clavinet
- Abdul Wali - guitar
- Karl Pitterson - guitar
- Uziah "Sticky" Thompson - percussion
- Skully - percussion
- "Dirty" Harry Hall - tenor saxophone
- Bobby Ellis - trumpet

Technical

- Karl Pitterson - recording engineer
- Alex Sadkin, Jack Nuber, Karl Pitterson - remix engineer
- Herbie Miller, Ozzie Brown - production coordination
- Andy Engel - artwork
- Kim Gottlieb - front cover photography
