= MafiaTone HiFi =

British music brand

Mafia Tone is a music brand active early in the UK reggae movement. The Jah MafiaTone HiFi sound system launched in Birmingham, UK in 1975 and remained active until 1980.

During this short time Jah MafiaTone HiFi made a considerable impact in developing the city as a hub for reggae in the UK. Proprietor Stafford Douglas and his team operated the sound system in various venues across the UK.

Entering the existing roots reggae scene consisting of figures like Sir Coxsone International, Jah Shaka and Fatman Sound, Jah Mafia Tone HiFi quickly began releasing popular records within the UK's reggae and Afro-Caribbean communities.

Mafia Tone had an influence in the introduction of the Rastafarian ideology into Birmingham's dancehalls. This was owed to Stafford's frequent trips to Jamaica where he would source reggae music, conduct and cut dub versions to tracks to be played by Jah MafiaTone HiFi back in the UK.

Stafford launched the Mafia Tone record label and released Dungeon, voiced by Glen Miller of the Wailing Souls in 1972. After recording only two tracks on this label, he moved on to launch the Art & Craft label putting out Motherless Children by Symbol, as well as works by artists such as Johnny Clarke. Between his work in the UK and Jamaica, he scouted and produced recordings for numerous reggae artists.

Now Generation label was launched in 1985 and produced the first hit for Bonito Star, Money Can't Buy Me Love, in 1986.
