= The Revolutionaries =

Jamaican reggae band

The Revolutionaries (sometimes known as "Revolutionaires") was a Jamaican reggae band.

== Career ==
The Revolutionaries were formed in 1975 as the house band at Channel One Studios, operated by the Hoo Kim brothers. The group developed from Skin, Flesh and Bone, a band that had performed at Kingston's Tit for Tat Club, with Sly Dunbar on drums and Bertram "Ranchie" McLean on bass. At Channel One, Dunbar began working with Robbie Shakespeare, who had previously played bass for Bunny Lee's Aggrovators.

The band's personnel varied and included guitarists JoJo Hookim, McLean, and Radcliffe "Dougie" Bryan; keyboardists Ossie Hibbert, Errol "Tarzan" Nelson, Robbie Lyn, and Ansel Collins; percussionists Uziah "Sticky" Thompson and Noel "Scully" Simms; saxophonists Tommy McCook and Herman Marquis; trumpeter Bobby Ellis; and trombonist Vin Gordon.

In 1976, The Revolutionaries attained further respect from the Sound System and dub fraternity when they recorded a track named after author Alex Haley's character, Kunta Kinte, which would become one of reggae music's most recognisable riddims and which for many years was only played by selected sound systems on dubplate. The track Kunta Kinte was based on an earlier tune, Beware Of Your Enemies, released from Jamaica's Channel One. The 1976 dub version released by The Revolutionaries became a sound system anthem for many years on dubplate, and also inspired a UK version produced by Mad Professor in 1981. It has also inspired Drum and Bass and jungle covers, and was consistently played by Jah Shaka.

The band played on numerous dub albums and recorded as a backing band for artists like B.B. Seaton, Carl Malcolm, Black Uhuru, Culture, Prince Alla, Leroy Smart, Gregory Isaacs, John Holt, The Heptones, Mighty Diamonds, I-Roy, Tapper Zukie, Trinity, U Brown, Errol Scorcher, Serge Gainsbourg among others.

== Discography ==
=== The Revolutionaries ===
- Revival Dub Roots Now - 1976 - Well Charge
- Revolutionary Sounds - 1976 - Channel One/Well Charge
- Sounds Vol 2 - 1979 - Ballistic
- Vital Dub Well Charged - 1976 - Virgin
- Dread At The Controls - 1978 - Hawkeye
- Dub Expression - 1978 - High Note
- Earthquake Dub - 1978 - Joe Gibbs
- Jonkanoo Dub - 1978 - Cha Cha
- Reaction In Dub - 1978 - Cha Cha
- Sentimental Dub - 1978 - Germain
- Top Ranking Dub - 1978 - Rootsman
- Burning Dub - 1979 - Burning Vibrations
- Dub Out Her Blouse & Skirt - 1979 - Germain
- Dutch Man Dub - 1979 - Burning Vibrations
- Goldmine Dub - 1979 - Greensleeves
- Outlaw Dub - 1979 - Trojan
- Dawn Of Creation - Sagittarius
- Dub Plate Specials At Channel One - Jamaican Recordings
- Green Bay Dub - 1979 - Burning Vibrations
- Medley Dub - High Note
- Phase One Dubwise Vol 1 & 2 - Sprint
- Satta Dub Strictly Roots - Well Charge
- Dial M For Murder In Dub Style - 1980 - Express
- I Came, I Saw, I Conquered - 1980 - Channel One

=== Compilations ===
- Channel One - Maxfield Avenue Breakdown - Dub & Instrumentals - 1974-1979 - Pressure Sounds (2000)
- Revival - 1973-1976 - Cha Cha (1982)
- Roots Man Dub - 1979 - GG's
- Channel One Revisited Dub - Top Beat (1995)
- Macca Rootsman Dub - Jamaican Gold (1994)
- The Rough Guide to Dub - World Music Network (2005)

=== With The Aggrovators ===
- Agrovators Meets The Revolutioners At Channel One Studios - 1977 - Third World
- Rockers Almighty Dub (Dubwise, Rockers, Bass & Drums) - 1979 - Clocktower
- Agrovators Meet Revolutionaries Part II - Micron

=== Others ===
- Kunta Kinte - 1976 - Channel One
- Guerilla Dub - 1978 - Burning Sounds
- The Revolutionaries & We The People Band - Revolutionary Dub - 1976 - Trenchtown
- Bobby Ellis And The Professionals Meet The Revolutionaries - Black Unity - 1977 - Third World
- Derrick Harriott & The Revolutionaries - Reggae Chart Busters Seventies Style - 1977 - Crystal
- Sly & The Revolutionaries - Don't Underestimate The Force, The Force Is Within You - 1977 - J&L
- Sly & The Revolutionaries - Go Deh Wid Riddim - 1977 - Crystal
- Sly & The Revolutionaries With Jah Thomas - Black Ash Dub - 1980 - Trojan
- Errol Scorcher & The Revolutionaries - Rasta Fire (A Channel One Experience) - 1978 - Ballistic
- Ossie Hibbert & The Revolutionaries - Satisfaction In Dub - 1978 - Live & Love
- Pancho Alphonso & The Revolutionaries - Never Get To Zion - 1978 - Trojan
