= Bush Doctor =

Studio album by Peter Tosh
- Released: 1978
- Studios: Dynamic Sounds, Joe Gibbs Studio, Kingston, Jamaica and Bearsville, Woodstock, New York
- Genres: Reggae, rock, ska
- Length: 39:46
- Labels: Rolling Stones; EMI
- Producers: Peter Tosh, Robert Shakespeare

Peter Tosh chronology
Equal Rights (1977)	Bush Doctor (1978)	Mystic Man (1979)

"Bush Doctor"
Bush Doctor audio sample

Bush Doctor is the third studio album by Jamaican reggae singer Peter Tosh. It was released in 1978 on Rolling Stones Records. The album features Mick Jagger as guest vocalist on one song, while Keith Richards plays guitar on two tracks. The rhythm section featured Sly and Robbie.

== Critical reception ==
Professional ratings
Review scores
Source	Rating
AllMusic	3/5 stars
Christgau's Record Guide	B+
The Rolling Stone Album Guide	3.5/5 stars

The Bay State Banner called the album "a rather lame hybrid of rock and ska that pales beside his earlier, Jamaican releases on the Intel-Diplo label."

== Track listing ==
All tracks composed by Peter Tosh; except where indicated

Side 1

1. "(You Gotta Walk) Don't Look Back" (Smokey Robinson, Ronald White) – 3:43
2. "Pick Myself Up" – 3:55
3. "I'm the Toughest" – 3:48
4. "Soon Come" (Tosh, Bob Marley) – 3:54
5. "Moses – The Prophet" – 3:37

Side 2

1. "Bush Doctor" – 4:04
2. "Stand Firm" – 6:10
3. "Dem Ha Fe Get a Beatin'" – 4:11
4. "Creation" – 6:29

Bonus tracks on 2002 EMI Remaster

10. "Lesson in My Life" – (previously unreleased)
11. "Soon Come" – (long version)
12. "I'm the Toughest" – (long version)
13. "Bush Doctor" – (long version)
14. "(You Gotta Walk) Don't Look Back" (dub version)
15. "Tough Rock Soft Stones" – (previously unreleased)

== Personnel ==
- Peter Tosh – rhythm and acoustic guitars, clavinet, autoharp, lead vocals
- Robbie Shakespeare – bass, pick guitar, guitar, horn arrangements
- Sly Dunbar – drums, gato box
- Mikey "Mao" Chung – lead guitar, Moog synthesizer, Fender Rhodes, pick guitar
- Robert Lyn – acoustic piano, organ, Fender Rhodes, clavinet
- Keith Sterling – keyboards
- Luther François – soprano saxophone
- Donald Kinsey – lead guitar
- Larry McDonald – percussion
- Uziah "Sticky" Thompson – percussion

with:

- Karl Pitterson – arrangement on "Creation"
- Happy Traum – autoharp on "Creation"
- Keith Richards – guitar on "Bush Doctor" and "Stand Firm"
- Mick Jagger – vocals on "(You Gotta Walk) Don't Look Back"

Technical personnel

- The Glimmer Twins – executive producer
- Errol Thompson, Geoffrey Chung, Lew Hahn – engineer

== Charts ==
Chart performance for Bush Doctor
Chart (1978/79)	Peak position
Australia (Kent Music Report)	34
United States (Billboard 200)	104

== Sales and certifications ==
Certifications for Bush Doctor
Region	Certification	Certified units/sales
Netherlands (NVPI)	Gold	50,000^{^}
^{^} Shipments figures based on certification alone.
