= Cliff Hanger (album) =

Studio album by Jimmy Cliff
- Released: 1985
- Recorded: october 1983-april 1984 NYC
- Studios: Unique, New York City
- Genre: Reggae
- Length: 39:52
- Label: CBS
- Producers: Jimmy Cliff, La Toya Jackson, Amir-Salaam Bayyan, Paul Higgins, Rick Iantosca

Jimmy Cliff chronology
The Power and the Glory (1983)	Cliff Hanger (1985)	Hanging Fire (1988)

Professional ratings
Review scores
Source	Rating
Allmusic	3/5 stars

Cliff Hanger is an album by Jimmy Cliff, released in 1985 through CBS Records. In 1986, the album won Cliff the Grammy Award for Best Reggae Recording.

The album featured collaborations with members of Kool and the Gang and included two songs co-written by La Toya Jackson.

== Track listing ==
All songs by Jimmy Cliff, unless noted otherwise#

1. "Hitting with Music" – 4:15
2. "American Sweet" (Bayyan, La Toya Jackson) –3:41
3. "Arrival" – 4:07
4. "Brown Eyes" (Bayyan, La Toya Jackson) –3:39
5. "Reggae Street" – 3:29
6. "Hot Shot" – 4:25
7. "Sunrise" – 3:48
8. "Dead and Awake" – 3:36
9. "Now and Forever" – 4:55
10. "Nuclear War" – 4:12

== Personnel ==
- Jimmy Cliff – piano, vocals
- Jaco Pastorius – bass guitar (on "Brown Eyes")
- Ansel Collins – organ
- La Toya Jackson – writer, arranger
- Amir-Salaam Bayyan – synthesizer, guitar
- Ronald Bell – keyboards, tenor saxophone
- Harold Butler – keyboards
- Wilburn Cole – drums
- Peter Duarte – horn
- Sly Dunbar – drums
- Gary Henry – keyboards
- Christopher Meredith – bass
- Kim Palumu – guitar
- Michael Ray – trumpet
- Robbie Shakespeare – bass guitar
- Earl "Chinna" Smith – guitar
- Kendal Stubbs – bass guitar
- Dennis White – horn
- Curtis "Fitz" Williams – saxophone
- Sidney Wolfe – percussion
- Fernando Luis – guitar
- Isidro Ross – percussion
- Rick Iantosca – guitar, keyboards
- Syd Judah – horn
- Cliff Adams – trombone
- Bertram "Ranchie" McLean – rhythm guitar
