= Audrey Hall =

- Origin: Kingston, Jamaica
- Genres: Reggae
- Instrument: Vocals
- Labels: Penthouse, Germain

Audrey Hall (born c. 1948 in Kingston, Jamaica) is a Jamaican reggae singer.

== Background ==
Hall began her career singing with Dandy Livingstone in the duo Dandy & Audrey. They recorded the song "Morning Side of the Mountain" in 1969, the success of which led to an album of the same name. They released a second album on the Trojan label, I Need You. Livingstone also produced Hall's early solo recordings for his Downtown label.

== Career ==
By 1971, Hall had come to Trend Records which was run by Barry Class who managed The Foundations. She had a single released on the label. The song "Getting Ready For A Heartache" backed with her own composition, "M.Y.O.B. Leave Me Alone" The single did get some mainstream airplay. After that single, there was no material from Trend for her to record. She also had an invite from her mother to go to New York so she requested a release from the label.

Hall worked as a backing singer through much of the 1970s and early 1980s alongside her sister Pam, including on Jimmy Cliff's Give The People What They Want, and Peter Tosh's Mama Africa, but she made a comeback as a solo artist in 1986 with "One Dance Won't Do", an answer record to Beres Hammond's "What One Dance Can Do", produced by Donovan Germain, which took her into the UK top 20. This was followed up by "Smile" in 1986, which repeated her UK chart success and gave her her biggest hit, and "The Best Thing For Me". In 1986, she returned to recording duets, with "Heart Made of Stone" and the album Dynamic Duo, recorded with former Paragon singer Don Evans. She continued to work with Germain, recording for his Germain and Penthouse labels, and released the album Reggae Zones in 2001.

== Discography ==
=== Albums ===
- Morning Side of the Mountain (1970) Downtown (Dandy & Audrey)
- I Need You (197?) (Dandy & Audrey)
- Eight Little Notes (1986) Germain
- Just You Just Me (1987) Germain
- Dynamic Duo Trojan (Audrey Hall & Don Evans)
- Collectors Series (1999) Penthouse
- Reggae Zones (2001) Super Power

=== Singles ===
- "I Second That Emotion" (1968) Downtown (Audrey & The Dreamers)
- "Love Me Tonight" (1969) Downtown
- "Lover's Concerto" (1969) Downtown
- "You'll Lose a Good Thing" (1969) Downtown
- "One Fine Day" (1969) Downtown (b-side of Dandy's "Games People Play")
- "You Don't Care" (1960) Downtown (Dandy with Audrey)
- "Morning Side of the Mountain" (1969) Down Town (Dandy & Audrey)
- "One Dance Just Won't Do" (1985) Germain (UK #20)
- "Smile" (1986) Germain (UK #14)
- "The Best Thing For Me" (1986) Germain (UK #93)
- "I Want To Know What Love Is" Germain
- "Heart Made of Stone" (with Don Evans)
- "All I Need to Know" (1991) Penthouse (with Beres Hammond)
- "Open Up Your Eyes" (1999)
- "Fade Away" (1999) Barry U (with Don Evans)
