= Bomboclat =

Jamaican Patois expletive

Bomboclat (/ˈbʌm.bə.klɑːt/; also spelled bomboclaat, bomboklaat, bumboclaat, bumbaclot, etc.) is a slang expletive in Jamaican Patois. In Jamaican usage, it is considered a strong profanity, while in global internet culture, it has been used as a reaction word or meme caption.

== Etymology ==
The term derives from the words bumbo (a coarse Jamaican Patois term for the buttocks or genital region) and claat ('cloth', particularly a sanitary cloth). Combined, the phrase originally referred to a menstrual pad, which contributes to its strong taboo status.

The word "bombo" derives from multiple Atlantic–Congo languages.

== Meaning and usage ==
=== Jamaican usage ===
In Jamaican Patois and Jamaican English, bomboclat is used as an expletive to express anger, shock, frustration, or disgust. It is considered one of the strongest Jamaican curse words, similar in intensity to major English profanity.

When directed toward a person, the word functions as an insult, implying that the individual is contemptible or worthless.

=== Internet and meme usage ===
Outside Jamaica, particularly beginning around 2019, bomboclat gained popularity on social media platforms such as Twitter and TikTok as a meme format. Users often captioned images or videos with the single word "Bomboclat" as a word for expressing humor, surprise, or anger.

== Cultural context and sensitivity ==
Because the word originally referred to a sanitary cloth, it carries strong taboo connotations in Jamaican culture. Casual or joking use by people unfamiliar with its origins may be regarded as culturally insensitive or disrespectful. Although the term has been adapted into global meme culture, its original meaning remains offensive to many native speakers.

== Popularity and spread ==
The term became more widely known outside Jamaica through Jamaican music, diaspora communities, and the global influence of Jamaican Patois. For example, the word was popularized in part by Peter Tosh's song "Oh Bumbo Klaat" on Wanted Dread & Alive (1981). Its popularity on social media in the late 2010s helped standardize its use as a meme among non-Jamaican audiences.

== See also ==
- Internet meme
- Profanity
