= Winston Blake =

Jamaican sound system operator (1940-2016)

Winston "Merritone" Blake OD (19 November 1940 – 27 February 2016) was a Jamaican sound system operator, record producer, nightclub owner, promoter, and occasional recording artist, working under the pseudonyms Blake Boy and Judge Winchester.

== Career ==
He was born in Morant Bay, Saint Thomas, Jamaica, the youngest of four brothers, and attended Kingston College. Their mother died when Winston was young, and their father, Val Blake, began supplementing his income by selling radios and amplifiers, establishing his Mighty Merritone sound system in 1950. After Val Blake died in 1956, Winston and his brothers Trevor, Tyrone, and Monte began operating the sound system, and increasingly started competing with the larger sound systems from Kingston. The four Blake brothers moved to Kingston in 1962, and the popularity of Merritone grew, developing a reputation for being able to cater for all social classes.

Winston Blake said: "We were here before reggae, when R&B records were played alongside calypso, mento and country and western, that's what filled Jamaica's dance floors back then... When rock and roll came in, R&B dried up in the U.S. that's when Jamaica started making its own music." He organised talent competitions, and started producing locally successful records by artists such as Hopeton Lewis, Beres Hammond, the Mighty Diamonds, and Cynthia Schloss, who became his wife. Lewis' 1966 recording, "Take It Easy", has been called the first rocksteady record.

The Blake brothers opened the Turntable Club in Kingston in 1972, and it became known as the hub of the "Merritone sound". The album Live at the Turntable Club, featuring Dennis Brown, Delroy Wilson and Big Youth, was recorded there in 1974 and is regarded as the first live album produced in Jamaica. He continued working as a record producer, with I-Roy and others, and also recorded himself with producers including Harry J and Lee Perry, using pseudonyms such as "Blake Boy" and "Judge Winchester".

As a club owner and personal manager, Blake remained a central figure in the Jamaican music industry, and travelled widely around the world promoting Jamaican music. From 1990, he organised annual Merritone Reunion festivals, and also arranged Merritone Family Fun days in various US cities. In 1997 he was awarded the Order of Distinction for his contributions to Jamaica's entertainment industry, and, after his wife's death in 1999, he organised a series of memorial concerts in her honour, featuring some of the island's top musicians. He was a founding member of the Jamaica Association of Vintage Artistes.

He suffered a stroke in January 2016 and died in the University Hospital of the West Indies in Kingston in February, aged 75, as a result of complications from asthma.
