= Now Generation Band =

The Now Generation Band (or NOWGEN) was a Jamaican reggae band during the late 1960s into the 1970s. Beginning as a dance band on the road, they gradually undertook more recording dates and, in 1972, quit road work to concentrate on studio work.

The band comprised Mikey Chung and Geoffrey Chung on guitar, Val Douglas on bass, Robbie Lyn and Earl Wire Lindo on keyboards, with Martin Sinclair and Mikey "Boo" Richards on drums. They recorded with most Jamaican record producers such as Duke Reid, Joe Gibbs, Bunny Lee, Lee "Scratch" Perry, Harry J, Sonia Pottinger and Harry Mudie. Songs they recorded included "Dem Ha Fe Get a Beatin" and "Maga Dog" by Peter Tosh, (Joe Gibbs); "Beat Down Babylon" by Junior Byles, (Lee Perry); "Baby Don't Do it" and "Things in Life" by Dennis Brown, (Lloyd Matador); "Breakfast in Bed" by Lorna Bennett, (Harry J); "Life Is Just for Living" by Ernie Smith, "Shaft" by The Chosen Few (Derrick Harriott); plus "Y Mas Gan" by The Abyssinians.

It was noticed that "their music was 'uptown' and soul influenced", but work with Glen Brown and on Herman Chin Loy's 1973 Aquarius Dub showed that they were equally capable of raw roots material.
