= Lorna Bennett =

Jamaican reggae singer (born 1954)

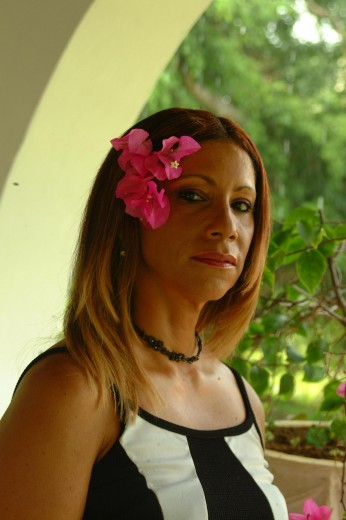

Background information
- Born: 1954 (age 71–72); Kingston, Jamaica
- Genres: Reggae
- Occupation: Singer
- Years active: Early 1970s–1974, 2001–present
- Labels: Trojan; Blue Mountain; Taxi

Lorna Bennett (born 1954) is a Jamaican reggae singer who twice topped the Jamaican singles chart in the early 1970s. Her 1972 recording of "Breakfast in Bed" was a successful single throughout the West Indies.

== Career ==
Bennett began her career singing in nightclubs. She was later noticed by Geoffrey Chung of the Now Generation Band, who nurtured her early recording career. A recording of "Morning Has Broken" was not commercially successful, but led to producer Harry J commissioning Chung to record Bennett singing "Breakfast in Bed", originally a hit for soul singer Baby Washington. The 1972 single by Bennett became successful throughout the West Indies. The b-side featured a deejay version of the track by Scotty. Bennett became the first female artist to top the singles chart in Jamaica for five years, a feat repeated with the follow-up, a cover of The Dixie Cups' "Chapel of Love". She also recorded a version of the Diana Ross song "It's My House", produced by Sonia Pottinger.

Further recordings followed, while Bennett at the same time studied law at university, these forming her debut album, This is Lorna. She then gave up her musical career, and moved back to St. Elizabeth and opened a legal practice.

In 2001, she decided to return to music, and performed at Christmas Vintage shows. In 2003, Bennett delivered a eulogy at the funeral of David "Scotty" Scott, the deejay with whom she had shared her first number one single.

== Personal life ==
Bennett was born in Kingston, Jamaica. She is the mother of reggae artist Protoje.

== Discography ==
=== Albums ===
- This is Lorna (1972) Harry J

=== Singles ===
- "I Believe in You" (1970), Harry J
- "Letter From Miami" (1970), Harry J/Decca
- "Morning Has Broken" (1971)
- "Breakfast in Bed" (1972), Harry J - JA #1
- "Skank in Bed" (1972), Blue Mountain - with Scotty
- "Going to the Chapel" (1973), Harry J - JA #1
- "It Hurts to Want it so Bad", Harry J
- "I Love Every Little Thing About You" (1973), Harry J
- "I'm Satisfied", (197?), Harry J
- "Stay With You Awhile" (197?), Harry J
- "Run Johnny Run" (1975), Jaywax/Trojan
- "Reverend Lee" (1976), Harry J/Trojan
- "To the Other Woman" (1976), Harry J/Trojan
- "Dancing to my Own Heartbeat" (1974), Wild Flower
- "Ease Up", Elizabeth
- "Stay With Me" (197?), Harung
- "It's My House" (1979), High Note
- "The Real Thing" (2006), Taxi
- "Knock Knock" (2006), Taxi
- "How U Like It" (2005), - featuring Spragga Benz
