= Hanging Fire =

Studio album by Jimmy Cliff
- Released: 1988
- Studios: House of Music, West Orange, New Jersey
- Genre: Reggae
- Label: Columbia
- Producers: Khalis Bayyan, Jimmy Cliff

Jimmy Cliff chronology
Club Paradise (1986)	Hanging Fire (1988)	Images (1989)

Hanging Fire is an album by the Jamaican reggae musician Jimmy Cliff, released in 1988. It was a commercial disappointment.

The album was nominated for a Grammy Award for "Best Reggae Recording". Its first single was "Love Me Love Me". Cliff supported the album with a three-month tour of North America.

== Production ==
The album was produced primarily at Tuff Gong Studios, with other work finished by Cliff in Africa. Cliff then took the songs to Khalis Bayyan, of Kool and the Gang, who remixed and overdubbed them.

Cliff recorded with the Oneness Band, in Jamaica, and with two popular Congolese bands in the Congo. Cliff was inspired to record in the Congo after opening for Steve Winwood there, on a 1986 tour. The song "Reggae Down Babylon" condemns apartheid.

== Critical reception ==
Professional ratings
Review scores
Source	Rating
AllMusic	3/5 stars
The Encyclopedia of Popular Music	3/5 stars
Los Angeles Times	1.5/4 stars
MusicHound Rock: The Essential Album Guide	2/5 stars
The Rolling Stone Album Guide	2/5 stars

The Washington Post wrote that the songs "aren't traditional reggae by any stretch of the imagination, but they successfully fuse the best aspects of reggae—the syncopated beat, the populist lyrics and the hypnotic melodies—with enough technological muscle and polish to thrive on a North American dance floor." The St. Petersburg Times thought that the album "is about as commercial and pop-oriented as reggae can get without losing sight of its folk roots."

The Boston Globe called Hanging Fire Cliff's "best effort of the '80s," writing that "his voice has returned to its crystalline purity." The Los Angeles Times deemed the album "bland and characterless." The Toronto Star noted that the album "shows the singer taking two steps back to the traditions of Africa—and one side-step into the soppiest of pop."

AllMusic wrote that the album "shows him effectively mixing his own quick-step version of the music with general pop trends." MusicHound Rock: The Essential Album Guide considered that "mediocrity from Cliff may not be so unsettling had he not once reached greatness."

== Track listing ==
All tracks are written by Jimmy Cliff.

No.	Title	Length
1.	"Love Me Love Me"	4:24
2.	"Hanging Fire"	5:23
3.	"Girls and Cars"	5:02
4.	"She Was So Right for Me"	4:43
5.	"It's Time"	5:21
6.	"Reggae Down Babylon"	4:23
7.	"Hold Tight (Eye for an Eye)"	4:22
8.	"Soar Like an Eagle"	5:30

== Personnel ==
- Jimmy Cliff – lead and backing vocals
- Alex Williams, Mark Attalla – guitar
- Khalis Bayyan, Manuel Herrera – keyboards
- Randy Weber – synthesizer
- Kendal Stubbs – drum programming
