= Legalize It =

Studio album by Peter Tosh
- Released: June 1976
- Recorded: 1975–1976
- Studios: Treasure Isle and Randy's, Kingston, Jamaica
- Genre: Reggae
- Length: 39:04
- Labels: Virgin, Columbia
- Producer: Peter Tosh

Peter Tosh chronology
Legalize It (1976)	Equal Rights (1977)

Legalize It is the debut studio album by Jamaican singer-songwriter and former Wailer Peter Tosh, released in June 1976. It was recorded at Treasure Isle and Randy's, Kingston.

Legalize It is one of the two solo albums released in 1976 by Wailers members, along with Bunny Wailer's album Blackheart Man. Bob Marley and his new Wailers also released Rastaman Vibration.

The song was written in response to his ongoing victimization by the Jamaican police and as a political piece pushing for the legalization of cannabis, particularly for medical use. In 1977, Tosh backed this up by saying "We are the victims of Rasclot circumstances. Victimization, colonialism, gonna lead to bloodbath". Tosh also said "Herb will become like cigarettes", in an NME interview in 1978.

== Reception ==
Professional ratings
Review scores
Source	Rating
AllMusic	4.5/5 stars
Christgau's Record Guide	B
Rolling Stone	(favorable)

The title track was banned when released in Jamaica in 1975. Attempts to suppress the song failed, however, catapulting Tosh to international fame.

"Legalize It"
Legalize It audio sample

The album was released in the United States in June 1976 and appeared on the Billboard 200 album chart for two weeks, peaking at No. 199. In 1999, the album was certified platinum by the Recording Industry Association of America for over one million copies sold.

Reviewing in Christgau's Record Guide: Rock Albums of the Seventies (1981), Robert Christgau wrote: "Unlike most sidemen who go on to pursue their own artistic interests, ex-Wailer Tosh has managed to gather about half an album for his solo debut, which ain't bad. 'Ketchy Shuby' even has the makings of a novelty hit. But oh, how his light heart and romantic spirit are missed among his old mates."

The album was included in the 2005 book 1001 Albums You Must Hear Before You Die.

== Track listing ==
All tracks composed by Peter Tosh; except where indicated

1. "Legalize It" – 4:35
2. "Burial" (Tosh, Bunny Livingston) – 3:54
3. "What'cha Gonna Do?" – 2:25
4. "No Sympathy" – 4:35
5. "Why Must I Cry" (Tosh, Bob Marley) – 3:08
6. "Igziabeher (Let Jah Be Praised)" – 4:37
7. "Ketchy Shuby" – 4:53
8. "Till Your Well Runs Dry" (Tosh, Livingston) – 6:09
9. "Brand New Second Hand" – 4:03

=== Sony Legacy Edition ===
A Sony Legacy Edition was released in June 2011. It was produced by Jerry Rappaport and Sam Dion.

Disc 1: Original LP and demos

1. "Legalize It"
2. "Burial"
3. "What'cha Gonna Do"
4. "No Sympathy"
5. "Why Must I Cry"
6. "Igziabeher (Let Jah Be Praised)"
7. "Ketchy Shuby"
8. "Till Your Well Runs Dry"
9. "Brand New Second Hand"
10. "Legalize It" (Demo)
11. "No Sympathy" (Demo)
12. "Why Must I Cry" (Demo)
13. "Igziabeher (Let Jah Be Praised)" (Demo)
14. "Ketchy Shuby" (Demo)
15. "Till Your Well Runs Dry" (Demo)
16. "Brand New Second Hand" (Demo)

Disc 2: Tosh's original mix, alternates and dubs

1. "Legalize It"
2. "Burial"
3. "What'cha Gonna Do"
4. "No Sympathy"
5. "Why Must I Cry"
6. "Igziabeher (Let Jah Be Praised)"
7. "Ketchy Shuby"
8. "Till Your Well Runs Dry"
9. "Brand New Second Hand"
10. "Legalize It" (Alternate Version)
11. "Burial" (Dub Plate)
12. "What'cha Gonna Do" (Shajahshoka Dub Plate)
13. "Igziabeher (Let Jah Be Praised)" (Shajahshoka Dub Plate)
14. "Second Hand" (Shajahshoka Dub Plate)
15. "Burial" (Dub Plate)
16. "Legalize It" (Dub Plate)

Disc 1, Tracks 1–9 released as original LP - Columbia PC 34253 (U.S.), 1976

Disc 1, Tracks 10–16 and Disc 2, Tracks 1–10 previously unreleased

Disc 2, Tracks 11–12 and 14–16 released on limited edition dubplates, 1976

Disc 2, Track 13 from The Ultimate Peter Tosh Experience (Shanachie 6802, 2009)

== Personnel ==
- Peter Tosh – guitar, keyboards, vocals
- Al Anderson – guitar
- Aston Barrett, Robbie Shakespeare – bass guitar
- Carlton "Santa" Davis, Carlton Barrett – drums
- Tyrone "Organ D" Downie – keyboards
- Donald Kinsey – guitar
- Robbie "Ras" Lee – harmonica
- Rita Marley – background vocals
- Judy Mowatt – background vocals
- Bunny Wailer – background vocals

== Charts ==
Chart performance for Legalize It
Chart (1976)	Peak position
US Billboard 200	199
