= Uziah Thompson =

Jamaican musician (1936–2014)

Uzziah "Sticky" Thompson
- Also known as: Cool Sticky
- Born: 1 August 1936; Mannings Mountain, Jamaica
- Died: 25 August 2014 (aged 78) Miami, Florida, United States
- Genres: Ska, rocksteady, reggae
- Occupations: Deejay, musician, record producer
- Instruments: Percussion, drums
- Years active: Late 1950s–2014

Uzziah "Sticky" Thompson (1 August 1936 – 25 August 2014) was a Jamaican percussionist, vocalist and deejay active from the late 1950s. He worked with some of the best known performers of Jamaican music and played on hundreds of albums.

== Biography ==
Thompson was born the third of five children in rural Mannings Mountain, Jamaica on 1 August 1936. Due to his family's poverty he was unable to complete his education and moved to Kingston at the age of 15 in search of work.

Thompson found employment with Clement "Coxsone" Dodd, assisting him with running his sound system, in time becoming a deejay with the system under the name "Cool Sticky". He became one of the earliest men to record in the new deejay style, using his mouth to make clicks and other percussive sounds. As a deejay he recorded with The Skatalites and can be heard on the tracks "Ball of Fire", "El Pussy Cat Ska", "Guns of Navarone", as well as others. While working for Dodd he became friends with Lee "Scratch" Perry, and Thompson recorded as a deejay for Perry, and for Joe Gibbs in the late 1960s, on tracks such as "Train to Soulsville".

Thompson rose to prominence as an instrumentalist in the early 1970s, beginning with a session by The Wailers for Perry in 1970, soon becoming one of Jamaica's top percussionists. He became a regular session musician in several studios, including playing as a member of Gibbs' house band The Revolutionaries, recording prolifically throughout the 1970s and 1980s, and appearing on recordings by artists including Big Youth, Dennis Brown, The Congos, Culture (including Two Sevens Clash), Peter Tosh, Burning Spear (Dry and Heavy), Yabby You (Beware Dub), The Wailing Souls and Serge Gainsbourg. He performed as part of the live bands of several artists including Jimmy Cliff (playing on the 1976 album In Concert and playing in his Oneness band). In the 1980s, Thompson was a regular member of Black Uhuru, playing on their early 1980s albums Sinsemilla, Red, Chill Out, and Dub Factor.

In 1978, Sticky Thompson made a brief cameo in Ted Bafaloukos' film Rockers, playing the tambourine in the Harry J's Recording Studio with Kiddus I. He was also part of the Rockers All Stars, the group responsible for creating the instrumental music for the film.

Thompson continued to play regularly on studio sessions for artists such as Bunny Wailer, Grace Jones (as a member of the Compass Point All Stars), The Tom Tom Club, Gregory Isaacs, and Ziggy Marley throughout the 1980s and 1990s. More recently he recorded with Stephen Marley (the Grammy-winning Mind Control), Sinéad O'Connor, Bruno Blum and Michael Franti.

Thompson remained active in the Jamaican music industry. In the 2000s he moved into production, with his sons Kevin and Alrick and toured the world with Ziggy Marley's band. He died on 25 August 2014, aged 78, at his Miami, Florida home after suffering a heart attack. Leaving his wife Sharon of 40 years, daughters Andria, Chairmane, Anna-Kay (Annie) and his sons Kevin and Alrick "Sticky2" Thompson; Alrick himself died on February 6, 2016.

== Collaborations ==
With Dennis Brown

- Visions of Dennis Brown (Joe Gibbs Music, 1978)
- Words of Wisdom (Joe Gibbs Music, 1979)
- Spellbound (Joe Gibbs Music, 1980)
- Foul Play (A&M Records, 1981)
- Yesterday, Today & Tomorrow (Joe Gibbs Music, 1982)

With Jimmy Cliff

- Brave Warrior (EMI, 1975)
- Follow My Mind (Reprise Records, 1975)
- Give Thankx (Warner Bros. Records, 1978)
- Give the People What They Want (MCA Records, 1981)
- Special (Columbia Records, 1982)
- The Power and the Glory (CBS Records, 1983)

With Joe Cocker

- Sheffield Steel (Island Records, 1982)

With Carlene Davis

- At the Right Time (Carib Gems, 1980)
- Paradise (Orange Records, 1984)

With Gwen Guthrie

- Gwen Guthrie (Island Records, 1982)

With Grace Jones

- Warm Leatherette (Island Records, 1980)
- Nightclubbing (Island Records, 1981)
- Living My Life (Island Records, 1982)
- Hurricane (PIAS Recordings, 2008)

With Stephen Marley

- Mind Control (Tuff Gong, 2007)
- Revelation Pt. 1 – The Root of Life (Universal Records, 2011)

With Ziggy Marley and the Melody Makers

- Play the Game Right (EMI, 1985)
- One Bright Day (Virgin Records, 1989)
- Jahmekya (Virgin Records, 1991)
- Joy and Blues (Virgin Records, 1993)
- Free Like We Want 2 B (Elektra Records, 1995)
- Fallen Is Babylon (Elektra Records, 1997)
- Spirit of Music (Elektra Records, 1999)

With John Martyn

- Sapphire (Island Records, 1984)

With Willie Nelson

- Countryman (Lost Highway Records, 2005)

With Sinéad O'Connor

- Throw Down Your Arms (Chocolate and Vanilla, 2005)

With Barry Reynolds

- I Scare Myself (Island Records, 1982)

With The Royals

- Israel Be Wise (Ballstic Records, 1978)
- Moving On (Kingdom Records, 1981)

With Peter Tosh

- Equal Rights (EMI, 1977)
- Bush Doctor (EMI, 1978)
- Mystic Man (EMI, 1979)
- Wanted Dread & Alive (Capitol Records, 1981)
- Mama Africa (EMI, 1983)
- No Nuclear War (EMI, 1987)

With Betty Wright

- Wright Back At You (Epic Records, 1983)
