= Cynthia Schloss =

Jamaican singer

Cynthia Schloss-Blake
- Born: Cynthia Schloss; April 12, 1948
- Origin: Trench Town, Jamaica
- Died: February 25, 1999 (aged 50)
- Occupation: Singer

Cynthia Schloss (April 12, 1948 – 25 February 1999) was a Jamaican singer.

Schloss was born the third of six children. She attended the Trench Town Elementary and Ardenne High School.

In 1971, she won the finals at the Merritone Amateur Talent Exposure. After that break-through she became a regular at shows. Well-known songs performed by Schloss include Surround Me with Love, As If I Didn't Know, You Look like Love, Oh What a Smile Can Do, Love Me Forever.

She was married to musician Winston "Merritone" Blake.

== See also ==
- Music of Jamaica
