= Clive Hunt =

Jamaican reggae musician

- Born: 31 May 1952 (age 73); Linstead, St. Catherine, Jamaica
- Genres: Reggae
- Labels: Trojan; Azul; High Note; Universal; Barclay; Sony/Columbia; Treasure Isle; Island; Island Jamaica; Dynamics; Mango; Federal; Tuff Gong International; VP; Iconic Azul

Clive Hunt (born 31 May 1952) is a Jamaican reggae multi-instrumentist, arranger, composer and producer.

== Biography ==
Hunt was born in Linstead, St. Catherine, Jamaica. He learned the trumpet while at Stony Hill Approved school, and joined the 1st Battalion, The Jamaica Regiment Band at the age of seventeen. On leaving the service he was recruited by Byron Lee for his band the Dragonaires, touring with the group in North America. He became a sought-after session musician, playing trumpet and also bass guitar, flute, horn, keyboards, and saxophone. He was also employed as an arranger and producer, working with many singers and musicians. Amongst others he worked with: Chaka Khan, Stevie Wonder, Peter Tosh, Wailers, Grace Jones, Max Romeo, Pablo Moses, Jimmy Cliff, Johnny Clarke, Judy Mowatt, Devon Irons, Duke Reid, Sister Carol, Marcia Griffiths, Yasus Afari, J.C. Lodge, Congos, Chaka Demus, Ruddy Thomas, Twiggy, Al Campbell, Joe Higgs, Burning Spear, Lloyd Parks, Horace Andy, Dean Frazer, Gregory Isaacs, Jimmy Riley, I-Threes, Spanner Banner, Toots and the Maytals, Leroy Sibbles, Leroy Smart, Nadine Sutherland, Delroy Wilson, Capleton, Chris Stanley, Trinity, Errol Brown, Dillinger, Phillip Frazer, Nitty Gritty, Cutty Ranks, Ras Michael & the Sons of Negus, Vybz Kartel, Chris Martin, Kiprich, Macka Diamond, Aidonia, Sizzla, Lutan Fyah, Alpha Blondy, King Sounds, Dennis Bovell, the Brecker Brothers, Kali, Bernard Lavilliers, Betty Wright, Pushim, Pierpoljak, Yaniss Odua and Tiken Jah Fakoly.

He released his first album Satta I (Trojan) under the name of "Lizzard" in 1976. A second dub album, Orthodox Dub was released on the Wackie's label.

Hunt emigrated to New York City in the late 1970s. He worked there with Joe Gibbs and Lloyd Barnes' Wackie's set-up. He developed cocaine dependence and in 1987 was deported from the US after being charged with drug-related offences. He went through rehab in 1991 and has since re-established himself as a successful producer, working with the likes of Beres Hammond, Judy Mowatt, The Abyssinians and Garnett Silk, and recorded with Jimmy Cliff, Steely & Clevie and the Rolling Stones.

In the 21st century he was signed by VP Records as a producer for the label and has produced for artists such as Etana, Jah Cure, Maxi Priest, Jah9, Richie Spice, and Queen Ifrica. He produced the Various Artists collection We Remember Dennis Brown for the label, released in 2016. VP Records released the instrumental album Blue Lizzard on November 13, 2020.

== Discography ==
- Satta I (1977) Trojan (as Lizzard)
- Orthodox Dub (197?) Wackie's
- Blue Lizzard (2020) VP Records
