= Robbie Shakespeare =

Jamaican bass guitarist (1953–2021)

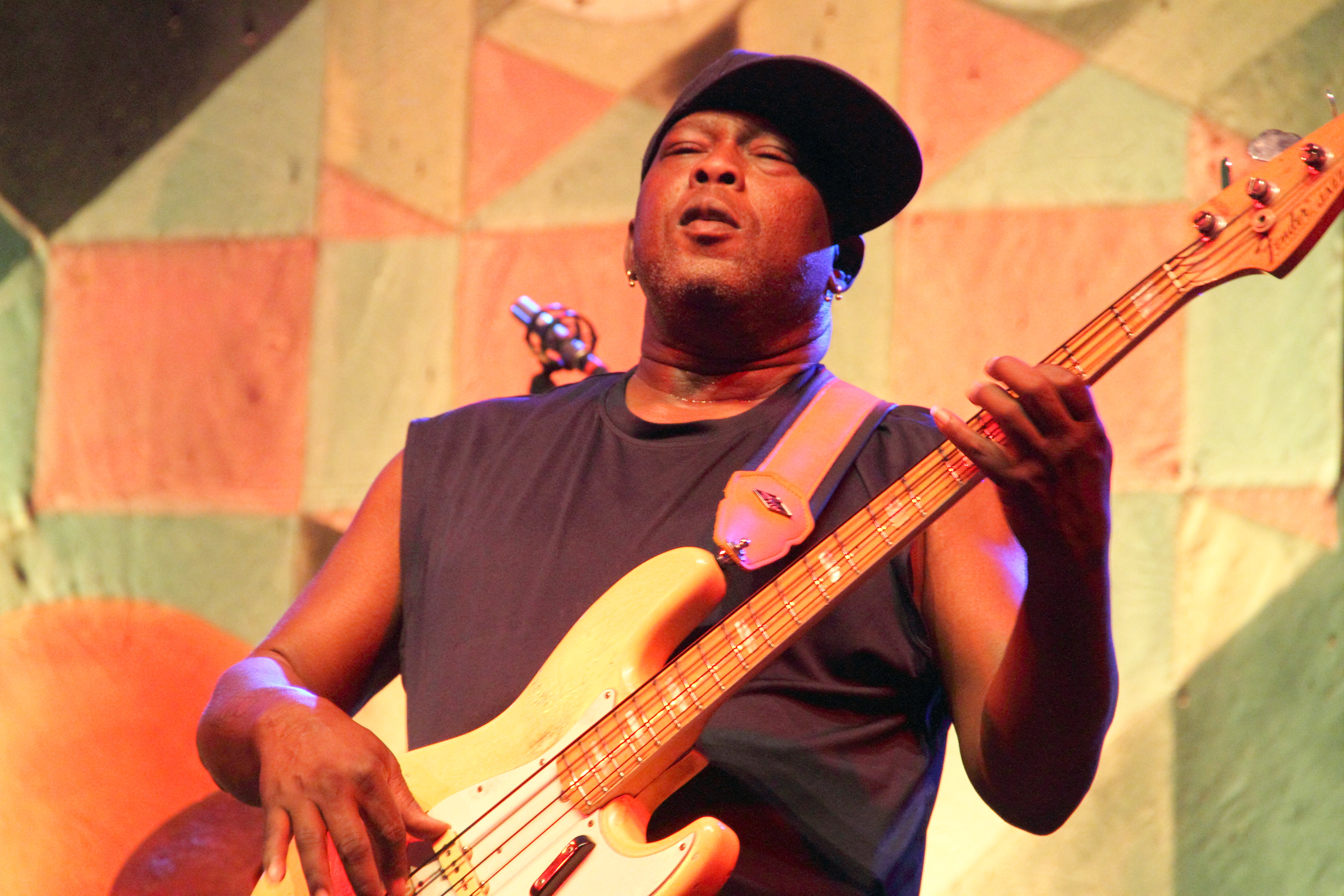
- Shakespeare performing at TFF Rudolstadt in 2015

Background information
- Born: Robert Warren Dale Shakespeare; 27 September 1953; Kingston, Jamaica
- Died: 8 December 2021 (aged 68) Miami, Florida, U.S.
- Genres: Reggae; dub
- Occupations: Musician; record producer
- Instruments: Bass guitar; vocals
- Formerly of: Sly and Robbie; Black Uhuru

Robert Warren Dale Shakespeare (27 September 1953 – 8 December 2021) was a Jamaican bass guitarist and record producer, best known as half of the reggae rhythm section and production duo Sly and Robbie, with drummer Sly Dunbar. Regarded as one of the most influential reggae bassists, Shakespeare was also known for his creative use of electronics and production effects units. He was sometimes nicknamed "Basspeare".

As a part of Sly and Robbie, Shakespeare worked with various reggae artists such as U-Roy, Peter Tosh, Bunny Wailer, Dennis Brown, Gregory Isaacs, Sugar Minott, Augustus Pablo, Yellowman, and Black Uhuru. His production work also extended beyond the reggae genre, covering various pop and rock artists such as Mick Jagger, Bob Dylan, Jackson Browne, Cyndi Lauper, Joe Cocker, Yoko Ono, Serge Gainsbourg, and Grace Jones. Prior to his involvement in Sly and Robbie, he was a member of the session groups the Revolutionaries and the Aggrovators.

== Career ==
Shakespeare grew up in East Kingston, Jamaica. He had a musical family, such that "his family home was a rehearsal and hangout spot for a variety of upcoming musicians and singers." His brother Lloyd had a band called the Emotions which rehearsed in the house. Shakespeare's first instrument was an acoustic guitar that was always present in the home. Later, the bass player Aston "Family Man" Barrett came into his yard, as it was near a popular location for selling marijuana. Shakespeare had been trying acoustic guitar and drums, but when he heard Family Man's bass playing, he was attracted to the deep bass sound. Shakespeare recalled saying "I wan fi learn how to play this thing [bass]. You haffi teach me", and Barrett agreed to give Shakespeare bass lessons.

Shakespeare first went in a music studio when he helped carry Family Man's brother Carlton Barrett's drums into the studio and help set up the drums. This developed into sneaking into the studio and waiting outside as bands recorded. Whenever Family Man recorded, Shakespeare would try to both listen to the session and watch the bass player's hands; afterwards at Shakespeare's family house, the bassist would show Shakespeare in person the basslines that had been recorded.

Shakespeare continued to study electric bass with Aston Barrett, the bass player from the Upsetters, and later The Wailers. He collaborated with the drummer Sly Dunbar for the first time when they played in the Channel One Studio house band, which was called the Revolutionaries. After Barrett joined the Wailers, Shakespeare took over the bass role in Barrett's former group, Hippy Boys. In 1979, Shakespeare and Dunbar started an independent music production company and record label called Taxi Records.

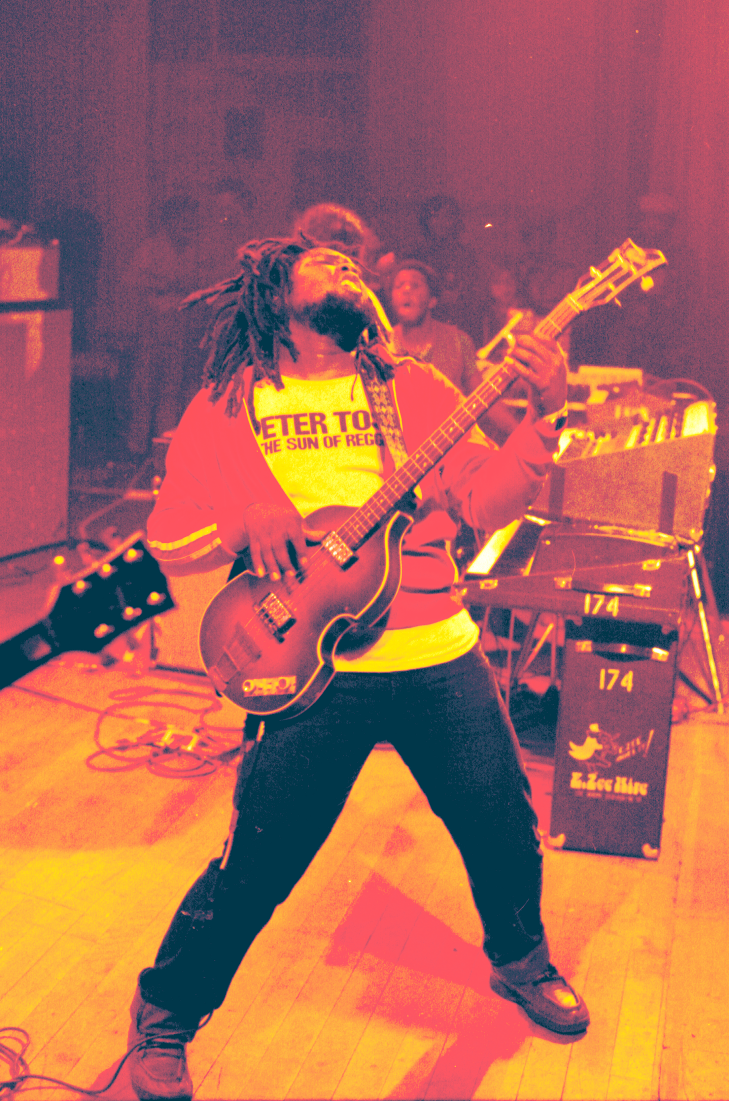
Robbie Shakespeare in 1978

== Death ==
Shakespeare died following kidney surgery in Florida, on 8 December 2021, at the age of 68. Reports state that the musician had been suffering from kidney related issues, including a rejected organ, and was on dialysis.

== Equipment ==
=== Basses ===
- Höfner 500/1 bass
- Fender Jazz bass
- Schecter eight-string bass
- PRS bass

=== Amps ===
- Markbass SA 450
- Markbass TA 503

== Selected discography ==
=== Sly and Robbie albums ===
- Language Barrier (1985)
- Rhythm Killers (1987)
- Taxi Fare (1987)
- Friends (1998)
- Rhythm Doubles (2006)
- Dubrising (2014)

== Collaborations ==
With Joan Armatrading

- Walk Under Ladders (A&M Records, 1981)

With Gary Barlow

- Sing (Decca Records, 2012)

With Dennis Brown

- Visions of Dennis Brown (Joe Gibbs Music, 1978)
- Words of Wisdom (Joe Gibbs Music, 1979)
- Spellbound (Joe Gibbs Music, 1980)
- Foul Play (A&M Records, 1981)
- Yesterday, Today & Tomorrow (Joe Gibbs Music, 1982)
- Love's Got A Hold On Me (Joe Gibbs Music, 1984)
- Hold Tight (Live & Learn, 1986)
- Brown Sugar (Taxi Records, 1986)
- Good Vibrations (Yvonne's Special, 1989)
- Cosmic (Observer, 1992)
- Give Prasies (Tappa, 1993)

With Jackson Browne

- World in Motion (Elektra Records, 1989)

With Jimmy Cliff

- Follow My Mind (Reprise Records, 1975)
- Give the People What They Want (MCA Records, 1981)
- Cliff Hanger (CBS Records, 1985)
- Humanitarian (Eureka Records, 1999)

With Joe Cocker

- Sheffield Steel (Island Records, 1982)

With Bootsy Collins

- Play with Bootsy (Thump, 2002)

With Carlene Davis

- At the Right Time (Carib Gems, 1980)
- Paradise (Orange Records, 1984)
- Taking Control (Nicole Records, 1987)
- Yesterday Today Forever (Nicole Records, 1987)
- Christmas Reggae Rock (Nicole Records, 1988)
- Carlene Davis (Eko Records, 1992)

With Ian Dury

- Lord Upminster (Polydor Records, 1981)

With Bob Dylan

- Infidels (Columbia Records, 1983)
- Empire Burlesque (Columbia Records, 1985)
- Down in the Groove (Columbia Records, 1988)

With Gwen Guthrie

- Gwen Guthrie (Island Records, 1982)
- Portrait (Island Records, 1983)

With Mick Jagger

- She's the Boss (Columbia Records, 1985)

With Garland Jeffreys

- Don't Call Me Buckwheat (BMG, 1991)

With Grace Jones

- Warm Leatherette (Island Records, 1980)
- Nightclubbing (Island Records, 1981)
- Living My Life (Island Records, 1982)
- Hurricane (PIAS Recordings, 2008)

With Ziggy Marley and the Melody Makers

- Hey World! (EMI, 1986)

With Jenny Morris

- Honeychild (East West, 1991)

With Yoko Ono

- Starpeace (PolyGram Records, 1985)

With Sinéad O'Connor

- Throw Down Your Arms (Chocolate and Vanilla, 2005)
- Theology (Rubyworks Records, 2007)

With Simply Red

- Life (East West Records, 1995)
- Blue (East West Records, 1998)

With Barry Reynolds

- I Scare Myself (Island Records, 1982)

With The Royals

- Pick Up the Pieces (Magnum Records, 1977)
- Israel Be Wise (Ballstic Records, 1978)
- Ten Years After (Ballistic Records, 1978)
- Moving On (Kingdom Records, 1981)

With Carly Simon

- Hello Big Man (Warner Bros. Records, 1983)

With Sting

- 44/876 (A&M Records, 2018)

With Peter Tosh

- Legalize It (Columbia Records, 1976)
- Equal Rights (EMI, 1977)
- Bush Doctor (EMI, 1978)
- Mystic Man (EMI, 1979)
- Wanted Dread & Alive (Capitol Records, 1981)
- Mama Africa (EMI, 1983)

== Appearances in media ==
Shakespeare appeared in the 2011 documentary Reggae Got Soul: The Story of Toots and the Maytals which was featured on BBC and described as "The untold story of one of the most influential artists ever to come out of Jamaica" (see Toots and the Maytals). Both Robbie and Sly were featured in the recording sessions of the album Hurricane by Grace Jones, in the documentary Grace Jones: Bloodlight and Bami, by Sophie Fiennes, about the model/singer Grace Jones.

Shakespeare also appeared in the 1978 movie Rockers as himself.
