= Sly Dunbar =

Jamaican drummer (1952–2026)

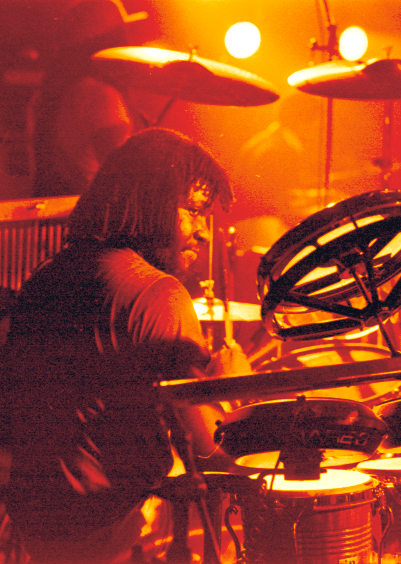
- Dunbar performing with Peter Tosh in 1979

Background information
- Born: Lowell Fillmore Dunbar; 10 May 1952; Kingston, Jamaica
- Died: 26 January 2026 (aged 73) Kingston, Jamaica
- Genres: Reggae
- Occupation: Musician
- Instruments: Drums; percussion
- Years active: 1970–2026
- Formerly of: Sly and Robbie; Black Uhuru

Lowell Fillmore "Sly" Dunbar (10 May 1952 – 26 January 2026) was a Jamaican drummer, best known as one half of the prolific Jamaican rhythm section and reggae production duo Sly and Robbie.

== Life and career ==
Dunbar was born in Kingston, Jamaica, on 10 May 1952. He began playing at 15 in a band called the Yardbrooms. His first appearance on a recording was on the Dave and Ansell Collins album Double Barrel. Dunbar joined a band with Ansell Collins called Skin, Flesh and Bones.

Speaking on his influences, Dunbar explained:

My mentor was the drummer for the Skatalites, Lloyd Knibb. And I used to listen a lot to the drummer for Booker T. & the M.G.'s, Al Jackson Jr., and a lot of Philadelphia. And there are other drummers in Jamaica, like Santa and Carly from the Wailers Band, Winston Bennett, Paul Douglas, Mikey Boo. I respect all these drummers and have learnt a lot from them. From them, I listened and created my own style. They played some things I copied, other things I recreated.

In 1972, Dunbar met and became friends with Robbie Shakespeare, who was then bass guitarist for the Hippy Boys. Shakespeare recommended Dunbar to Bunny Lee as a possible session drummer for the Aggrovators. Dunbar and Shakespeare decided to continue performing together. They worked with Peter Tosh and his band until 1981, recording five albums.

Dunbar noted about the Mighty Diamonds' song "Right Time": "When that tune first come out, because of that double tap on the rim nobody believe it was me on the drums, they thought it was some sort of sound effect we was using. Then when it go to number 1 and stay there, everybody started trying for that style and it soon become established." According to The Independent, the entire album Right Time was "revolutionary", the breakthrough album of "masters of groove and propulsion" Dunbar and Shakespeare, with "Sly's radical drumming matching the singers' insurrectionary lyrics blow-for-blow."

Dunbar and Shakespeare formed their Taxi Records label in 1980. It has seen releases from many international successful artists, including Black Uhuru, Chaka Demus and Pliers, Ini Kamoze, Beenie Man and Red Dragon.

He played for the Aggrovators for Bunny Lee, the Upsetters for Lee Perry, the Revolutionaries for Joseph Hoo Kim, and recorded for Barry O'Hare in the 1990s.

Dunbar played drums on several noteworthy tracks produced by Lee Perry including "Night Doctor", Junior Murvin's "Police and Thieves", and Bob Marley's "Punky Reggae Party" 12" track (although the track was produced by Perry, Dunbar's drum track was actually recorded at Joe Gibbs Duhaney Park studio).

Sly and Robbie also played on Bob Dylan's albums Infidels and Empire Burlesque (using recordings from the Infidels sessions). Other sessions include their appearance on three Grace Jones albums, and work with Herbie Hancock, Joe Cocker, Serge Gainsbourg and the Rolling Stones.

In 2008, Sly Dunbar collaborated with the Jamaican percussionist Larry McDonald, on McDonald's debut album Drumquestra.

Dunbar appeared in the 2011 documentary Reggae Got Soul: The Story of Toots and the Maytals which was featured on the BBC.

In 1979, Brian Eno remarked of Sly Dunbar: " (...) So when you buy a reggae record, there's a 90 percent chance the drummer is Sly Dunbar. You get the impression that Sly Dunbar is chained to a studio seat somewhere in Jamaica, but in fact what happens is that his drum tracks are so interesting, they get used again and again."

Dunbar died from cancer at his home in Kingston, Jamaica, on 26 January 2026, at the age of 73.

== Awards ==
Sly Dunbar was a 13-time Grammy nominee. He received two Grammy awards: the 1985 Grammy for Best Reggae Recording for the Black Uhuru album Anthem for which Dunbar and Robbie Shakespeare were producers, and one for the 1999 Best Reggae Album Grammy award for the Sly & Robbie album entitled Friends.

Grammy Nominations

- 2014: Best Reggae Album, Reggae Connection
- 2013; Best Reggae Album, New Legend – Jamaica 50th Edition
- 2011: Reggae Album, Made In Jamaica
- 2011: Reggae Album, One Pop Reggae +
- 2009: Best Reggae Album, Amazing
- 2008: Best Reggae Album, Anniversary
- 2007: Best Reggae Album, Rhythm Doubles
- 2005: Best Reggae Album, The Dub Revolutionaries
- 1999: Best Reggae Album, Friends
- 1987: Best Reggae Recording, Brutal (Album)
- 1986: Best R&B Instrumental Performance (Orchestra, Group Or Soloist), "Bass And Trouble"
- 1985: Best Reggae Recording, "Anthem"
- 1983: Best Ethnic Or Traditional Folk Recording, Reggae Sunsplash '81, A Tribute To Bob Marley (Album)

Grammy Wins

- 1999: Best Reggae Album, Friends
- 1985: Best Reggae Recording, "Anthem"

== Collaborations ==
With Joan Armatrading

- Walk Under Ladders (A&M Records, 1981)

With Gary Barlow

- Sing (Decca Records, 2012)

With Dennis Brown

- Visions of Dennis Brown (Joe Gibbs Music, 1978)
- Words of Wisdom (Joe Gibbs Music, 1979)
- Joseph's Coat (Joe Gibbs Music, 1979)
- Spellbound (Joe Gibbs Music, 1980)
- Foul Play (A&M Records, 1981)
- More Dennis Brown (Yvonne's Special, 1981)
- Yesterday, Today & Tomorrow (Joe Gibbs Music, 1982)
- Love's Got a Hold on Me (Joe Gibbs Music, 1984)
- Hold Tight (Live & Learn, 1986)
- Brown Sugar (Taxi Records, 1986)
- Good Vibrations (Yvonne's Special, 1989)
- Cosmic (Observer, 1992)
- Limited Edition (VP Records, 1992)
- Give Prasies (Tappa, 1993)

With Jackson Browne

- World in Motion (Elektra Records, 1989)

With Jimmy Cliff

- Follow My Mind (Reprise Records, 1975)
- Give the People What They Want (MCA Records, 1981)
- Special (Columbia Records, 1982)
- Cliff Hanger (CBS Records, 1985)
- Humanitarian (CBS Records, 1999)

With Joe Cocker

- Sheffield Steel (Island Records, 1982)

With Bootsy Collins

- Play with Bootsy (Thump, 2002)

With Carlene Davis

- At the Right Time (Carib Gems, 1980)
- Paradise (Orange Records, 1984)
- Taking Control (Nicole Records, 1987)
- Yesterday Today Forever (Nicole Records, 1987)
- Christmas Reggae Rock (Nicole Records, 1988)
- Carlene Davis (Eko Records, 1992)

With Ian Dury

- Lord Upminster (Polydor Records, 1981)

With Bob Dylan

- Infidels (Columbia Records, 1983)
- Empire Burlesque (Columbia Records, 1985)
- Down in the Groove (Columbia Records, 1988)

With Gwen Guthrie

- Gwen Guthrie (Island Records, 1982)
- Portrait (Island Records, 1983)
- Good to Go Lover (Polydor Records, 1986)

With Nona Hendryx

- Nona (RCA Records, 1983)

With Mick Jagger

- She's the Boss (Columbia Records, 1985)

With Garland Jeffreys

- Don't Call Me Buckwheat (BMG, 1991)
- Wildlife Dictionary (RCA Records, 1997)

With Grace Jones

- Warm Leatherette (Island Records, 1980)
- Nightclubbing (Island Records, 1981)
- Living My Life (Island Records, 1982)
- Hurricane (PIAS Recordings, 2008)

With Ziggy Marley and the Melody Makers

- Hey World! (EMI, 1986)

With Jenny Morris

- Honeychild (East West, 1991)

With Yoko Ono

- Starpeace (PolyGram Records, 1985)

With Sinéad O'Connor

- Throw Down Your Arms (Chocolate and Vanilla, 2005)

With Barry Reynolds

- I Scare Myself (Island Records, 1982)

With The Royals

- Pick Up the Pieces (Magnum Records, 1977)
- Israel Be Wise (Ballstic Records, 1978)
- Ten Years After (Ballistic Records, 1978)
- Moving On (Kingdom Records, 1981)

With Carly Simon

- Hello Big Man (Warner Bros. Records, 1983)

With Simply Red

- Life (East West Records, 1995)
- Blue (East West Records, 1998)

With The Rolling Stones

- Undercover (Rolling Stones Records, 1983)

With Peter Tosh

- Equal Rights (EMI, 1977)
- Bush Doctor (EMI, 1978)
- Mystic Man (EMI, 1979)
- Wanted Dread & Alive (Capitol Records, 1981)
- Mama Africa (EMI, 1983)
