= The Tamlins =

Jamaican reggae group

- Origin: Jamaica
- Genre: Reggae
- Years active: 1969–present
- Members: Carlton Smith; Junior Moore; Derrick Lara
- Past members: Winston Morgan

The Tamlins are a Jamaican reggae vocal group formed in the late 1960s, known for their hits such as "Baltimore", and their work with artists such as Peter Tosh.

== History ==
The group originally comprised Carlton Smith, Junior Moore and Winston Morgan. They recorded in the 1970s for producers such as Ed Wallace, and worked as backing vocalists for the likes of John Holt, Delroy Wilson, Pat Kelly, Marcia Griffiths, Barry Biggs, Gregory Isaacs, and Dennis Brown.

Having released their debut album, Black Beauty, in 1976, they came to prominence in the late 1970s by releasing 12" singles in Jamaica for Channel One Studios, usually covering earlier rocksteady hits such as "Hard to Confess".

They worked for several years with Peter Tosh, both on recordings an international tours, before parting ways with him in 1983. Morgan left the group the same year, to be replaced by Derrick Lara, who had enjoyed some success as a solo artist in the early 1980s. They went on to work with Rita Marley and more recently Julian Marley, with whom they collaborated on his 2019 album As I Am.

They gained wider attention for their version of the Randy Newman song "Baltimore", with adapted lyrics. Sly and Robbie's production and its arrangement (influenced by that used on Nina Simone's cover of the song, released the previous year) made the single one of the biggest hits in Jamaica in 1979. They also recorded "Go Away Dream" for the same producers. In 1981 they were called in by producer Henry "Junjo" Lawes to complete the Israel Vibration album Why You So Craven, after the producer and the latter group fell out.

The group appeared in the 2009 documentary film Rocksteady: The Roots of Reggae.

== Album discography ==
- Black Beauty (1976), Weed Beat
- Red Rose (1983), Vista Sounds
- I'll Be Waiting (1987), Live & Learn
- Love Divine (1988), SKD
- No Surrender (1995), VP
- Back2Back (1999), Jet Star – with The Mighty Diamonds
- Re-Birth (2010), JDF
- Crossroads (2014), Zojak World Wide

Compilations

- Greatest Hits (1980), Channel One/Hit Bound
- I'll Be Waiting (2001), Jet Star
- The Best of the Tamlins (2012), Jammy's
