= Pam Hall =

Jamaican reggae singer

- Born: London, England
- Genres: Reggae, R&B, jazz
- Years active: 1975–present
- Labels: VP
- Website: pamhallmusic.com

Pam Hall is a Jamaican reggae singer whose career began in the 1970s.

== Career ==
Hall recorded as a solo artist from the mid-1970s as well as providing backing vocals for several other artists including Jimmy Cliff, Judy Mowatt, Beres Hammond, Dennis Brown, and Peter Tosh, sometimes along with her sister Audrey. Among her earliest releases were "Creation", a duet with Orville Wood as Pam & Woody, and "You Should Never Do That", a duet with Tinga Stewart.

Her 1986 single "Dear Boopsie" topped the reggae charts and reached number 54 on the UK Singles Chart. Her first album, Perfidia, was released in 1987.

She had further hits on the reggae charts in the 1990s with her version of "I Will Always Love You", "Young Hearts Run Free", and "You Are Not Alone". She continued to be in demand for backing vocals, working with Toots Hibbert, and Ziggy Marley in the 1990s. She went on to release a string of solo albums on VP Records.

In the 1990s she filled in for Judy Mowatt in the I Threes, joining the group in the decade that followed.

== Discography ==
- Perfidia (1987), World Enterprise
- Always Love you (1993), VP
- Missing You Baby (1995), VP
- Magic (1996), VP
- Bet You Don't Know (1998), VP
- Time For Love (2001), VP
- R&B Hits Reggae Style (2001), VP
- Songs in the Key of Dancehall (2007), Jet Star
