= Keith Sterling =

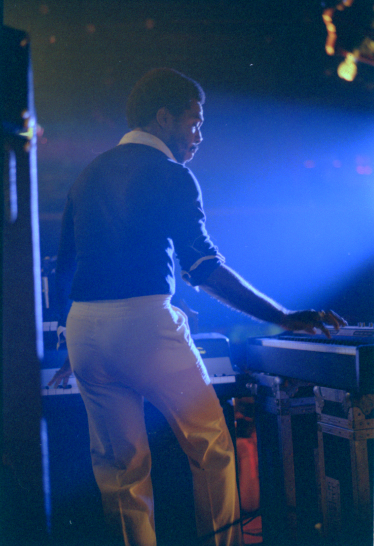

Background information
- Also known as: Keith Sterling
- Born: Keith Sterling-McLeod; January 1952 (age 73)
- Origin: Kingston, Jamaica
- Genres: Reggae
- Occupation: Musician
- Instruments: Keyboard, synthesizer, piano, organ
- Years active: 1970s–present

Keith Sterling (born Keith Sterling-McLeod, January 1952, Kingston, Jamaica) is a piano and keyboard player.

== Biography ==
Keith Sterling is a well-respected Jamaican session musician, having played in various session/backing bands including The Upsetters, The Aggrovators, Soul Syndicate, The Boris Gardiner Happening, Word, Sound and Power, Lloyd Parks' We The People Band, and Sly and Robbie's Taxi Gang. He is currently a member of The Wailers Band.

His older brothers Lester and Roy are also musicians, Lester having played saxophone with The Skatalites and Roy trumpet with Lynn Taitt and the Jets.
