= Robbie Lyn =

Jamaican session musician (born 1951)

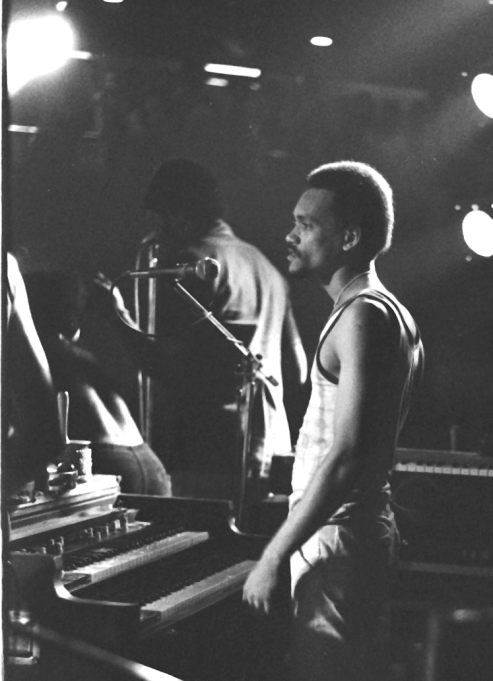
- Lyn in 1979

Background information
- Born: Robert Bernard Lyn; 1951 (age 73–74); Kingston, Jamaica
- Origin: Jamaica
- Genres: Reggae
- Occupation: Musician
- Instruments: Keyboard, synthesizer, piano, organ
- Years active: 1970s–present

Robert "Robbie" Bernard Lyn is a Jamaican session musician who plays piano, keyboard and synthesiser.

== Biography ==
Robbie Lyn is a popular Jamaican session musician, who has played with various session/backing bands including Now Generation, Sound Dimension, Word, Sound and Power, and Sly and Robbie. He has also backed and/or toured with many reggae artists, including Burning Spear, Peter Tosh, Dennis Brown and Third World.

== Discography ==
=== Solo albums ===
- Making Notes (2007) – for which Lyn received the Reggae Academy Award for Best Instrumental Album, 2008.

=== Participated Albums ===
- Never Ending by Beres Hammond (2018, VP Records) – Keyboards
- From Then 'Til Now by Roots Architects (2024, Fruits Records) – Keyboards, organisation
