= Dean Fraser =

Jamaican saxophonist

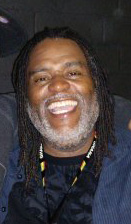
- Fraser in 2008

Background information
- Born: Dean Ivanhoe Fraser; 4 August 1957 (age 68); Kingston, Colony of Jamaica, British Empire
- Genres: Reggae, jazz
- Occupation: Saxophonist
- Instruments: Saxophone, vocals
- Years active: Mid-1970s–present
- Labels: Joe Gibbs, Germain, Island, Greensleeves, Shanachie, VP, RAS

Dean Ivanhoe Fraser (sometimes appearing as Dean Frazer; born 4 August 1957) is a Jamaican saxophonist who has contributed to thousands of reggae recordings since the mid-1970s. He was awarded the Musgrave Medal by the Jamaican government in 1993 in recognition of his services to music.

== Biography ==
Born in Kingston, Jamaica, Fraser started to play the clarinet at the age of 12. Around this time he met Ronald "Nambo" Robinson and Junior "Chico" Chin at a youth club in Jones Town and the three boys would eventually form a brass section. Fraser took up saxophone at the age of 15. The trio became the foremost horn section in Jamaica in the 1980s. In 1977 he joined Lloyd Parks' We The People Band, backing Dennis Brown on several of his recordings for Joe Gibbs. Fraser's first album, 1978's Black Horn Man, was produced by Gibbs. This was followed in 1979 by Pure Horns and Double Dynamite, and in 1980 by Revolutionary Sounds for producer Donovan Germain. Fraser provided horns for Sly & Robbie in the 1980s, both on record and on tour. Fraser appeared at the 1981 Reggae Sunsplash, performing an instrumental version of the recently deceased Bob Marley's "Redemption Song", which led to the 1984 album Pumping Air on Island Records' Mango label. Fraser went on to record two albums of Marley covers, Dean Plays Bob and Dean Plays Bob volume II. Dean Fraser married Sophia Wright on 21 March 1993 in Clarendon, Jamaica. They share one daughter.

The digital era of reggae, defined by the use of computers and drum machines to create the backing track, did not affect his output since acoustic instruments such as the saxophone were still in demand. Fraser has released several more albums since and he is recognized as one of Jamaica's top musicians. He toured extensively with Luciano from the late 1990s to the mid-2000s, as well as performing on and adding production to several of the singer's albums, including A New Day, Serious Times and Jah Is My Navigator. More recently, Fraser has been recording, producing and touring with singers Tarrus Riley and Duane Stephenson. Also, Fraser has redone 16 tracks on CD 2 of We Remember Gregory Isaacs, which was recorded in 2011 on VP Records.

== Discography ==
Solo albums

- Sings and Blows (1988), Greensleeves

Collaborative albums

- Two Colors - Dean Fraser and Ernie Ranglin (2022), VP / Tad's

Albums produced by Dean Fraser

- We Remember Bob Andy (2023), VP

Participated albums

- Never Ending by Beres Hammond (2018), VP - horn
- Throw Down Your Arms by Sinead O'Connor (2005), VP - saxophone
