= Peter Tosh =

Jamaican reggae musician (1944–1987)

The Honourable Peter Tosh OM GCOT
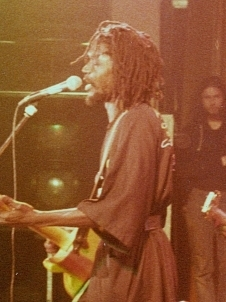
- Tosh (left) on the Bush Doctor tour in 1978

Background information
- Also known as: Stepping Razor
- Born: Winston Hubert McIntosh; 19 October 1944; Grange Hill, Jamaica
- Died: 11 September 1987 (aged 42) Kingston, Jamaica
- Cause of death: Murder (gunshot wounds)
- Genres: Reggae; ska; rocksteady
- Occupations: Musician; singer; songwriter
- Instruments: Guitar; vocals; keyboards; melodica; percussion; drums; violin
- Years active: 1961–1987
- Labels: Intel-Diplo, JAD Records
- Website: petertosh.com

Peter Tosh OM GCOT (born Winston Hubert McIntosh; 19 October 1944 – 11 September 1987) was a Jamaican musician and reggae singer. Along with Bob Marley and Bunny Wailer, he was one of the core members of the band the Wailers (1963–1976), after which he established himself as a successful solo artist and a promoter of Rastafari. Tosh was murdered in 1987 during a home invasion.

== Early life ==
Tosh was born Winston Hubert McIntosh on 19 October 1944 in Westmoreland, the westernmost parish of Jamaica. He was abandoned by his parents and "shuffled among relatives". When McIntosh was 15, his aunt died and he moved to Trenchtown in Kingston, Jamaica. McIntosh was educated in Bluefields up to age 17, then moved to Kingston to live with another aunt. He began an apprenticeship as a welder.

McIntosh first learned guitar after watching a man in the country play a song that captivated him. McIntosh watched the man play the same song for half a day, memorizing everything his fingers were doing. McIntosh then picked up the guitar and played the song back to the man. The man then asked McIntosh who had taught him to play; McIntosh told him that he had. During the early 1960s, as an aspiring musician, McIntosh went to vocal teacher Joe Higgs, who gave free music lessons to young people. Through his contact with Higgs, McIntosh met Robert Nesta Marley (Bob Marley) and Neville O'Reilly Livingston (Bunny Wailer). He then changed his name to Peter Tosh and the trio started singing together in 1962. Higgs taught the trio to harmonise and while developing their music, they would often play on the street corners of Trenchtown.

== Music career ==
By 1964, Tosh, Marley, and Bunny had formed the Wailing Wailers, with falsetto singer Junior Braithwaite, and backup singers Beverley Kelso and Cherry Smith. Initially, Tosh was the only one in the group who could play musical instruments. According to Bunny Wailer, Tosh was critical to the band because he was a self-taught guitarist and keyboardist, and thus became an inspiration for the other band members to learn to play. The Wailing Wailers had a major ska hit with their first single, "Simmer Down", and recorded several more successful singles before Braithwaite, Kelso and Smith left the band in late 1965. Marley spent much of 1966 in Delaware in the United States with his mother, Cedella (née Malcolm) Marley-Booker, and for a brief time was working at a nearby Chrysler factory. He returned to Jamaica in early 1967 with a renewed interest in music and a new spirituality. Tosh and Bunny were already Rastafarians when Marley returned from the US, and the three became very involved with the Rastafari faith. Soon afterwards, they renamed the musical group the Wailers. Tosh would explain later that they chose the name Wailers because to "wail" means to mourn or to, as he put it, "...express one's feelings vocally". He also claims that he was the beginning of the group, and that it was he who first taught Bob Marley the guitar. Also according to Bunny Wailer, the early Wailers learned to play instruments from Tosh.

During the mid-1960s, Tosh, along with Marley and Wailer, were introduced to Danny Sims and Johnny Nash, who signed the three artists to an exclusive recording contract on Sims' and Nash's JAD Records label as well as an exclusive publishing agreement through Sims' music publishing company, Cayman Music. Rejecting the up-tempo dance of ska, the band slowed their music to a rocksteady pace, and infused their lyrics with political and social messages inspired by their new-found faith. The Wailers composed several songs for the American-born singer Nash before teaming with producer Lee "Scratch" Perry to record some of the earliest well-known reggae songs, including "Soul Rebel", "Duppy Conqueror", and "Small Axe". The collaboration had given birth to reggae music and in 1970 bassist Aston "Family Man" Barrett and his brother, drummer Carlton Barrett, joined the group. They recorded the album The Best of The Wailers, which was produced by Leslie Kong and released in 1971.

In 1972, Danny Sims assigned the balance of the JAD Records recording contract with the band to Chris Blackwell and Island Records company and released their debut album, Catch a Fire, in 1973, following it with Burnin' the same year. The Wailers had moved from many producers after 1970 and there were instances where producers would record rehearsal sessions that Tosh did and release them in England under the name "Peter Touch".

In 1973, Tosh was driving home with his girlfriend Evonne when his car was hit by another car driving on the wrong side of the road. The accident killed Evonne and severely fractured Tosh's skull.

After Island Records president Chris Blackwell refused to issue his solo album in 1974, Tosh and Bunny Wailer left the Wailers, citing the unfair treatment they received from Blackwell, to whom Tosh often referred with a derogatory play on Blackwell's surname, 'Whiteworst'. Tosh had written or co-written many of the Wailers' hit songs such as "Get Up, Stand Up", "400 Years", and "No Sympathy". Tosh went on to a solo career, releasing albums with CBS Records and Rolling Stones Records.

=== Solo career ===
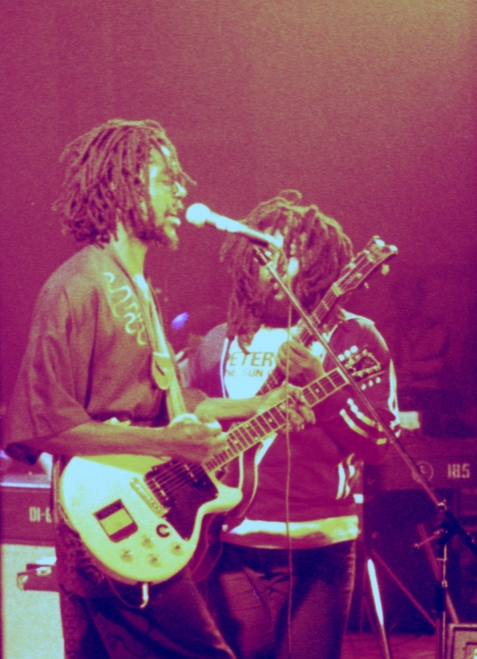
Tosh performing with Robbie Shakespeare in 1978

Tosh's debut solo album, Legalize It, was recorded in 1975–76 at Treasure Isle. It was released in June 1976 on CBS Records. The title track soon became popular among endorsers of cannabis legalization, reggae music lovers and Rastafari all over the world, and was a favourite at Tosh's concerts. Also in 1976, Tosh organised a backing band, Word, Sound and Power, who were to accompany him on tour for the next few years, and many of whom performed on his albums of this period. Tosh's second album, Equal Rights, was released in 1977. It featured his recording of a song co-written with Marley, "Get Up, Stand Up", and a cover of "Stepping Razor" that would also appear on the soundtrack to the film Rockers.

In 1978, the Rolling Stones' record label, Rolling Stones Records, contracted with Tosh, on which the album Bush Doctor was released, introducing Tosh to a larger audience. The album featured Rolling Stones frontmen Mick Jagger and Keith Richards, and the lead single – a cover version of the Temptations song "Don't Look Back" – was performed as a duet with Jagger. In April, Tosh performed at the Jamaican One Love Peace Concert of 1978. Tosh lit a marijuana spliff and lectured about legalising cannabis, lambasting attending dignitaries Michael Manley and Edward Seaga for their failure to enact such legislation. According to The Gleaner, Tosh became regular target for the police after the concert. In September, he was arrested by police at Half Way Tree square, on the grounds of smoking marijuana and attacking a police officer. He reported being beaten severely while in police custody – resulting in a broken hand and head injuries requiring stitches.

Mystic Man (1979) and Wanted Dread and Alive (1981) followed, both released on Rolling Stones Records. Tosh tried to gain some mainstream success while keeping his militant views, but was only moderately successful, especially when compared to Marley's achievements.

In September 1979, a controversy sparked after his performance at the No Nukes concerts at Madison Square Garden, where he wore Palestinian clothing (thawb and keffiyeh) and openly smoked marijuana. Tosh's appearance was considered a provocation towards the Jewish community in New York City, as the concerts took place during the Jewish New Year holiday. Despite his performance being advertised to appear in the accompanying film and on the triple live album, Tosh was removed from both releases. The Palestinian dress remained a trademark performance outfit in the following years.

In 1984, after the release of 1983's album Mama Africa, Tosh went into self-imposed exile, seeking the spiritual advice of traditional medicine men in Africa, and trying to free himself from recording agreements that distributed his records in South Africa. Tosh had been at odds for several years with his label, EMI, over a perceived lack of promotion for his music.

Tosh also participated in the international opposition to South African apartheid by appearing at anti-apartheid concerts and by conveying his opinion in various songs like "Apartheid" (1977, re-recorded 1987), "Equal Rights" (1977), "Fight On" (1979), and "Not Gonna Give It Up" (1983). In 1987, Tosh seemed to be having a career revival. He was awarded a Grammy Award for Best Reggae Performance in 1987 for No Nuclear War, his last record.

== Personal life ==
=== Religion ===
Along with Bob Marley and Bunny Wailer during the late 1960s, Peter Tosh became a devotee of Rastafari. One of the beliefs of the Rastas is that Haile Selassie, the Emperor of Ethiopia, was either an embodiment of God or a messenger of God, leading the three friends to be baptized in the Ethiopian Orthodox Church.

=== Unicycling ===
At some point after his departure from the Wailers, Tosh developed an interest in unicycles and became a unicycle rider, being able to ride forwards and backwards and hop. He often amused his audiences by riding onto the stage on his unicycle for his shows.

=== Family ===
Tosh's girlfriend Evonne was killed in a car crash in 1973. Tosh was in a relationship with his future wife Marlene Brown for about five years from 1982; she was 21 at the start of the relationship. Tosh had ten children including Carlos Andrew (1967), Gamal "Tosh 1" Jawara McIntosh (1980-2020) (mother Melody Cunningham), Aldrina Michelle and his youngest, Niambe, who has since 2009 been the administrator of her late father's estate. The others are his sons Horace David, Stephen, and Nabii; and his daughters Sheba, Camille Erone, and Tobi.

== Murder ==
On 11 September 1987, after Tosh returned to his home in Jamaica, a three-man gang came to his house on motorcycles demanding money. Tosh replied that he did not have any with him, but the gang did not believe Tosh. They remained at his residence for several hours and tortured Tosh in an attempt to extort money from him. Over the hours, as various associates of Tosh arrived to visit him, they were also taken hostage by the gunmen. The gunmen included chief thug Dennis "Leppo" Lobban, a man whom Tosh had previously befriended and tried to help find work after Lobban's release from a lengthy jail sentence.

Tosh said he did not have any money in the house, after which Lobban and the fellow gunmen opened fire in a reckless manner. Tosh was shot twice in the head and killed. Herbalist Wilton "Doc" Brown and disc jockey Jeff 'Free I' Dixon also died as a result of wounds sustained during the robbery. Several others in the house were wounded, including Tosh's common-law wife Andrea Marlene Brown, Free I's wife Yvonne ("Joy"), Tosh's drummer Carlton "Santa" Davis, and musician Michael Robinson.

According to Police Commissioner Herman Ricketts, Lobban surrendered and two other men were interrogated but not publicly named. Lobban pled innocent during his trial, telling the court he had been drinking with friends. The trial was held in a closed court due to the involvement of illegal firearms. Lobban was ultimately found guilty by a jury of eight women and four men and sentenced to death by hanging.

In 1995, Lobban's sentence was commuted and he remained in jail. Another suspect was acquitted due to insufficient evidence. The other two gunmen were never identified by name.

== Instruments ==
In 1983, at the Los Angeles stop on Tosh's Mama Africa tour, local musician Bruno Coon went to the hotel at which Tosh was staying, with a gift for him: a custom-built guitar in the shape of an M16 rifle. Tosh accepted the gift personally. The guitar was subsequently lost by the airlines when the tour went to Europe but was recovered when Tosh's public relations agent placed an article about its loss in Der Spiegel. Tosh went on to perform on stage with the guitar.

The promoters of the Flashpoint Film Festival announced in 2006 that Tosh's common-law wife Andrea "Marlene" Brown would auction it on eBay. Tosh's sons, Andrew Tosh and Jawara McIntosh, prevented the sale, claiming ownership of the guitar. In 2011 Andrew Tosh said that the guitar was in the custody of a close friend, awaiting the opening of a museum dedicated to Peter Tosh.

== Legacy ==
"Man in Business Suit Levitating emoji" based on 2 Tone Records logo, based on photo of Tosh.

In 1979, a 1964 photograph of Tosh in sunglasses and a suit, also featuring Bob Marley and the Wailers, was the inspiration for the logo of 2 Tone Records. The label released albums from ska bands such as The Specials. The logo featured a stylized man in a suit based on the photo of Tosh, although the figure was called "Walt Jabsco". The logo in turn was the inspiration for a character in a Webdings font designed by Vincent Connare in 1997 ("Man in Business Suit Levitating emoji" in the Emoji system). Connare changed the design to facing forward and floating. Tosh's children Andrew Tosh and Niambe McIntosh both praised the emoji in a 2021 BBC interview, with Andrew stating that "[Peter Tosh] wanted [people] to dance to their own (political) awakening".

In 1993, Stepping Razor: Red X was released, a documentary film chronicling Tosh's life, music, and death. It was directed by Canadian filmmaker Nicholas Campbell, produced by Wayne Jobson and based upon a series of spoken-word recordings made by Peter Tosh. The film was released on DVD in 2002.

A monument to Tosh is maintained by his family in Belmont, Westmoreland, which is open to the public. His birthday is celebrated there annually with live reggae music.

In October 2012, Tosh was posthumously awarded Jamaica's fourth highest honour, the Order of Merit.

In 2015, Tosh's daughter – the administrator of the Peter Tosh Estate – deemed that April 20 should be celebrated as International Peter Tosh Day, in honour of his "philosophy of responsible cannabis consumption for medicinal and spiritual health benefits".

A square on Trafalgar Road in Kingston, Jamaica, was renamed Peter Tosh Square. The square is home to the Peter Tosh Museum, opened on Peter Tosh's 72nd birthday on 19 October 2016. Among the artifacts on display is Tosh's M16 guitar. There was a benefit concert for the grand opening, on 22 October, featuring Chronixx, Luciano and Andrew Tosh.

The annual Peter Tosh Gala Awards event was inaugurated in 2017.

In October 2019, a commemorative blue plaque dedicated by the Nubian Jak Community Trust honoring Bob Marley, Peter Tosh, and Bunny Wailer was placed at the former site of Basing Street Studios in London, where Catch a Fire and Burnin' were completed.

In 2023, Tosh was posthumously bestowed with the Order of the Companions of O. R. Tambo.

== Discography ==
=== Studio albums ===
List of albums, with selected chart positions
Title	Album details	Peak chart positions				Certifications
Title	Album details	US	US R&B/HH	AUS	UK	Certifications
Legalize It	Released: June 1976; Label: Columbia Records, Island Records, Intel-Diplo; Format: Vinyl, Cassette	199	—	—	54	RIAA: Platinum
Equal Rights	Released: 1977; Label: Columbia Records, Intel-Diplo, Rolling Stones Records, EMI Music Distribution; Format: Vinyl, Cassette	146	—	—	—	RIAA: Gold
Bush Doctor	Released: December 9, 1978; Label: Rolling Stones Records, EMI; Format: Vinyl, Cassette	104	—	34	—	NVPI: Gold
Mystic Man	Released: 1979; Label: Rolling Stones Records, EMI; Format: Vinyl, Cassette	123	—	72	—	
Wanted Dread & Alive	Released: 1981; Label: Rolling Stones Records, EMI, Capitol; Format:	91	40	—	—	
Mama Africa	Released: 1983; Label: Rolling Stones Records, EMI; Format:	59	49	47	—	
No Nuclear War	Released: 1987; Label: EMI; Format:	—	—	—	—	
"—" denotes a recording that did not chart or was not released in that territory.

=== Live albums ===
- Captured Live (1984)
- Live at the One Love Peace Concert (JAD) (2000)
- Live & Dangerous: Boston 1976 (2001)
- Live at the Jamaica World Music Festival 1982 (JAD) (2002)
- Complete Captured Live (2002)
- Live at My Father's Place 1978 (2014)

=== Compilations ===
Listed are compilations containing material previously unreleased outside of Jamaica.

- The Toughest (Capitol) (1988)
- Honorary Citizen (1997)
- Scrolls of the Prophet: The Best of Peter Tosh (1999)
- Arise Black Man (1999)
- Black Dignity (Early Works of the Stepping Razor) (2001)
- I Am That I Am (JAD) (2001)
- The Best of Peter Tosh 1977–1987 (2003)
- Can't Blame the Youth (JAD) (2004)
- Black Dignity (2004)
- Talking Revolution (2005)
- The Ultimate Peter Tosh Experience (2009)

=== Appears on ===
- The Wailing Wailers (1965)
- Negril (Eric Gale, 1975)
- Rastafari Dub (Ras Michael & The Sons of Negus, 1975)
- Blackheart Man (Bunny Wailer, 1976)
- Word Sound and Power (Chris Hinze, 1980)

=== Singles ===
- 1975 — Legalize It / Legalize It (Version) — Intel/Diplo PT-177 (JAM)
- 1975 — Brand New Second Hand / Brand New Second Hand (Version) — Intel/Diplo (JAM)
- 1976 — Legalize It / Brand New Second Hand — Virgin VS-140 or Island WIP-6323 (UK)
- 1976 — Legalize It / Why Must I Cry // Till Your Well Runs Dry — Columbia AE7 1109 (USA)
- 1976 — Ketchy Shubby / Iration — Intel/Diplo (JAM)
- 1976 — Babylon Queendom / Iration — Intel/Diplo (JAM)
- 1976 — Vampire / Dracula— Intel/Diplo (JAM)
- 1977 — African / African (Version) — Intel/Diplo (JAM)
- 1977 — Stepping Razor / Stepping Razor (Version) — Intel/Diplo (JAM)
- 1977 — African / Stepping Razor — Virgin VS-179 (UK)
- 1977 — Get Up, Stand Up (Mono) / Get Up, Stand Up (Stereo)— Columbia ASF 310 (USA)
- 1977 — Equal Rights / Equal Rights (Version) — Intel/Diplo (JAM)
- 1977 — Anti-Apartheid / Solidarity — Solomonic BW-0078 (JAM)
- 1978 — (You Gotta Walk) Don't Look Back / Soon Come — Intel/Diplo (JAM), Rolling Stones Records RS 19308 (US), EMI 2859 (UK)
- 1978 — I Am the Toughest / Toughest Version — Studio One CD-1033 (JAM), Rolling Stones Records RSR 103 (UK)
- 1979 — Bush Doctor / Bush Doctor (Version) — Intel/Diplo (JAM)
- 1979 — Buckingham Palace / Buckingham Palace (Version) (7") — Intel/Diplo (JAM)
- 1979 — Buk-In-Hamm Palace // Dubbing In Buk-In-Hamm / The Day the Dollar Die (12") — Intel/Diplo (JAM), Rolling Stones Records 12YRSR 104 (UK)
- 1979 — Buk-In-Hamm Palace / The Day the Dollar Die (7") — Rolling Stones Records RSR 104 (UK)
- 1979 — Buk-In-Hamm Palace / Buk-In-Hamm Palace (Dance Mix) // The Day the Dollar Die / Buk-In-Hamm Palace (Dub) — Rolling Stones Records 12RSR 104 (UK)
- 1979 — Buk-In-Hamm Palace / Recruiting Soldiers (7") — Rolling Stones Records RS 20000 (USA)
- 1979 — Buk-In-Hamm Palace // Crystal Ball / Dubbing In Buk-In-Hamm (12") — Rolling Stones Records/Atlantic DSKO 193
- 1979 — Stepping Razor / Legalise It — Virgin VS-304 (UK)
- 1980 — Can't Blame the Youth / Hammer — Intel/Diplo (JAM)
- 1980 — Jah Man / Hammer — Intel/Diplo (JAM)
- 1981 — Oh Bumbo Klaat / Oh Bumbo Klaat (Version) — Intel/Diplo (JAM)
- 1981 — Nothing But Love / Cold Blood — Rolling Stones Records RSR 107 (UK)
- 1981 — Nothing But Love // Cold Blood / Oh Bumbo Klaat — Rolling Stones Records 12RSR 107 (UK)
- 1981 — Nothing But Love / Oh Bumbo Klaat — EMI 8083 (USA)
- 1981 — Coming In Hot / Reggae-Mylitis — EMI 8094 (USA)
- 1982 — Rock with Me / Rock with Me (Version) — Intel/Diplo (JAM)
- 1982 — Peace Treaty / Glass House — Intel/Diplo (JAM)
- 1982 — Glass House / Glass House (Version) — Intel/Diplo (JAM)
- 1983 — Johnny B. Goode / Johnny B. Goode (Version) — Intel/Diplo (JAM)
- 1983 — Johnny B. Goode / Peace Treaty (7" e 10") — EMI RIC 115 (UK), EMI B-8159 (USA)
- 1983 — Johnny B. Goode / Glass House (12") — EMI 7807-1 e 7807-2 (USA)
- 1983 — Johnny B. Goode (Long) / Johnny B. Goode (Short) (12") — EMI SPRO-9912 e SPRO-9913 (USA)
- 1983 — Where You Gonna Run / Stop That Train (7" e 10") — EMI RIC 116 (UK), EMI B-8175 (7" USA), SPRO-9993 e SPRO-9994 (12" USA)
- 1983 — Mama Africa / Not Gonna Give It Up (7" e 10") — EMI RIC 117 (UK)
- 1987 — In My Song / Come Together (7") — Parlophone R 6156 (UK)
- 1987 — In My Song // Come Together / Nah Goa Jail (12") — Parlophone 12R 6156 (UK)

== See also ==
- List of Rastafarians
- List of reggae musicians
