= Buju Banton discography =

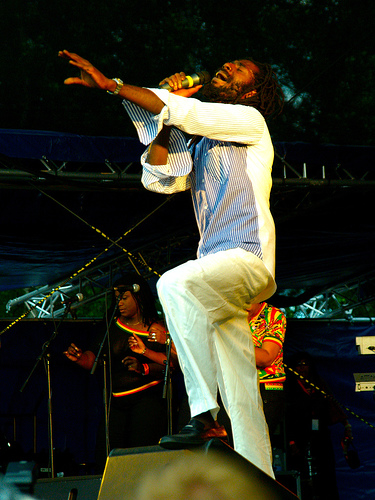
- Studio albums: 12
- Compilation albums: 11
- Singles: 5

Jamaican recording artist Buju Banton has released 12 studio albums.

== Studio albums ==
List of studio albums, with selected chart positions
Title	Album details	Peak chart positions							Certifications
Title	Album details	US	US HH	US Reggae	US Sales	US Indie	US Heat.	US Taste	Certifications
Stamina Daddy (Note: Reissued (in a slightly different version) as Quick by ExWorks Records in 1998; also rereleased as Gonna Bring Ya via RReMark Records in 2000.)	Released: October 16, 1992; Label: Techniques Records; Formats: CD, LP, digital download, streaming	—	—	—	—	—	—	—	
Mr. Mention	Released: 1992; Label: Penthouse Records; Formats: CD, LP, digital download, streaming	—	—	—	—	—	—	—	
Voice of Jamaica	Released: August 3, 1993; Label: Mercury Records; Formats: CD, LP, digital download, streaming	159	29	6	159	—	5	—	
'Til Shiloh	Released: July 18, 1995; Label: Loose Cannon, Island Records; Formats: CD, LP, digital download, streaming	148	27	2	148	—	3	—	RIAA: Gold
Inna Heights	Released: November 18, 1997; Label: Penthouse Records; Formats: CD, LP, digital download, streaming	—	—	1	—	—	34	—	
Unchained Spirit	Released: August 22, 2000; Label: ANTI-, Epitaph Records; Formats: CD, LP, digital download, streaming	128	—	2	128	5	5	—	
Friends for Life	Released: March 11, 2003; Label: VP Records, Atlantic Records; Formats: CD, LP, digital download, streaming	198	44	3	198	—	14	—	
Too Bad	Released: September 12, 2006; Label: Gargamel Music; Formats: CD, LP, digital download	—	—	6	—	—	—	—	
Rasta Got Soul	Released: April 21, 2009; Label: Gargamel Music; Formats: CD, LP, digital download	—	—	2	—	—	38	—	
Before the Dawn	Released: September 28, 2010; Label: Gargamel Music; Formats: CD, LP, digital download, streaming	—	—	2	—	—	26	—	
Upside Down 2020	Released: June 26, 2020; Label: Gargamel Music, Roc Nation; Formats: CD, LP, digital download, streaming	—	—	2	27	—	3	23	
Born for Greatness	Released: September 8, 2023; Label: Gargamel Music, Roc Nation; Formats: CD, LP, digital download, streaming	—	—	—	—	—	—	—	
Too Too Bad	Released: July 17, 2026; Label: Gargamel Music, VP Records; Formats: CD, LP, digital download, streaming	—	—	—	—	—	—	—	
"—" denotes releases that did not chart, or was not released in that country.

== Compilations and remix albums ==
Year	Title	Peak chart positions
Year	Title	US Reggae
1999	Rudeboys Inna Ghetto: Label: Jamaican Vibes	—
2000	Dubbing with the Banton: Label: Penthouse Records	—
2000	Flames of Freedom: Label: Artists Only! Records	—
2001	Ultimate Collection: Label: Hip-O Records	6
2001	The Best of the Early Years: 1990–1995: Label: Penthouse Records	—
2001	Want It!: Label: Interra Music Publishing	—
2002	The Best Of: Label: Hip-O Records, Island Def Jam Music Group	8
2004	Buju and Friends: Label: VP Records	—
2006	Toppa di Top and Dirty Rhythms: Label: Big Cat Records	7
2006	20th Century Masters - The Millennium Collection: The Best of Buju Banton: Label: Universal Music	—
2012	The Early Years, Vol. 2: The Reality of Life: Label: Penthouse Records	—

== Charted songs ==
List of songs with selected chart positions
Title	Year	Peak chart positions										Album
Title	Year	JAM Air.	CAN	UK	US Adult R&B	US R&B/HH Sales	US Dance Sales	US Bub.	US R&B/HH	US HH Airplay	US Rap	Album
"Make My Day"	1993	*	—	72	—	74	—	—	81	—	—	Voice of Jamaica
"Champion"	1995	*	—	—	—	53	16	17	67	—	23	'Til Shiloh
"Paid Not Played"	2003	*	—	84	—	—	—	—	—	—	—	Friends for Life
"Driver A"	2007	*	—	—	—	—	—	—	75	72	—	Too Bad
"Holy Mountain" (DJ Khaled featuring Buju Banton, Sizzla, Mavado and 070 Shake)	2019	*	99	—	—	—	—	12	—	—	—	Father of Asahd
"Memories" (featuring John Legend)	2020	*	—	—	17	—	—	—	—	—	—	Upside Down 2020
"I Am a Jamaican"	2020	1	—	—	—	—	—	—	—	—	—	Jamaica Festival 2020 Song Competition
"—" denotes items which were not released in that country or failed to chart. "*" denotes that the chart did not exist at that time.
