= Ultimate Collection (Buju Banton album) =

Compilation album by Buju Banton
- Released: May 1, 2001
- Genre: Dancehall/Roots reggae, reggae fusion
- Label: Hip-O/Universal Records

Buju Banton chronology
Unchained Spirit (2000)	Ultimate Collection (2001)	The Best of the Early Years: 1990–1995 (2001)

Professional ratings
Review scores
Source	Rating
Allmusic	4.5/5 stars

Ultimate Collection is a compilation album by dancehall/reggae artist Buju Banton released in 2001.

== Track listing ==
1. "Buju Movin'" – 3:40
2. "Ring the Alarm Quick" [Extended Mix] – 5:48
3. "How the World a Run" – 3:56
4. "No Respect" – 4:01
5. "Operation Ardent" – 3:57
6. "Willy (Don't Be Silly)" – 4:56
7. "Deportees (Things Change)" – 3:55
8. "Rampage" [Alternate Mix] – 3:46
9. "Murderer" – 3:57
10. "Sensemelia Persecution" – 4:03
11. "Champion" – 3:58
12. "Untold Stories" – 4:33
13. "Shiloh" – 0:18
14. "Hills and Valleys" – 4:33
15. "Mama Rule" – 3:19
16. "Love Sponge" – 3:37
17. "Fake Smile" [Hot Mix] – 3:45
18. "Give I Strength" – 4:01
