= The Best of Buju Banton =

Compilation album by Buju Banton
- Released: June 4, 2002
- Genre: Dancehall/Roots reggae
- Label: Hip-O/Universal

Buju Banton chronology
The Best of the Early Years: 1990–1995 (2001)	The Best of Buju Banton (2002)	Friends for Life (2003)

Professional ratings
Review scores
Source	Rating
AllMusic	4/5 stars

The Best of Buju Banton is a compilation album by dancehall reggae artist Buju Banton, released in 2002.

== Track listing ==
1. "Champion" [Remix] - 4:31
2. "Deportees (Things Change)" - 3:55
3. "Murderer" - 3:56
4. "Destiny" - 3:59
5. "Wanna Be Loved" - 4:06
6. "Untold Stories" - 4:34
7. "Heartbreak Lover" - 3:24
8. "Good Body" - 3:53
9. "Willy (Don't Be Silly)" - 4:55
10. "Circumstances" - 4:06
11. "Give I Strength" - 4:01
