= Voice of Jamaica =

Studio album by Buju Banton
- Released: August 3, 1993
- Studio: Chung King Recording Studio, New York City; Digital B Studios, Kingston, Jamaica; Mixing Lab Studios, Kingston, Jamaica; Music Works #2, Kingston, Jamaica; Penthouse Recording Studio, Kingston, Jamaica
- Genre: Dancehall; ragga hip hop; R&B
- Length: 61:40
- Label: Mercury/PolyGram
- Producer: Donovan Germain; Bobby "Digital" Dixon; Busta Rhymes; Dave Kelly; Mikey Bennett; Sly Dunbar; Steely & Clevie

Buju Banton chronology
Mr. Mention (1992)	Voice of Jamaica (1993)	'Til Shiloh (1995)

Singles from Voice of Jamaica
- 1. "Operation Ardent" Released: April 26, 1993; 2. "Deportees (Things Change)" Released: July 6, 1993; 3. "Make My Day" Released: August 2, 1993

Voice of Jamaica is the third studio album by Jamaican dancehall reggae artist Buju Banton. It was released on August 3, 1993 via Mercury Records/PolyGram and was his international debut. Its remastered and expanded edition was released in 2002 with additional tracks. Recorded in Kingston and New York City, the album is considered to be the one that introduced Banton to the world outside Jamaica, also bringing dancehall to the wider world.

Production was handled by Donovan Germain, Steely & Clevie, Dave Kelly, Bobby "Digital" Dixon, Busta Rhymes, Mikey Bennett and Sly Dunbar. It features guest appearances from Beres Hammond, Brian and Tony Gold, Busta Rhymes, Terry Ganzie, Tony Rebel and Wayne Wonder. The album peaked at number 159 on the Billboard 200 albums chart in the United States.

== Music and lyrics ==
"If Loving Was a Crime"
A sample of "If Loving Was a Crime", showing the blend of dancehall and R&B on the disc.

Musically the album shows a wide range of reggae music, with rhythms that vary from mainly hardcore dancehall, to roots reggae, R&B and ragga hip hop.

Lyrically it faces various personal, political, and cultural themes, including love, war, violence, police brutality, safe sex, poverty and spirituality.

== Critical reception ==
Professional ratings
Review scores
Source	Rating
AllMusic	4.5/5 stars
Entertainment Weekly	C+
Robert Christgau	(1-star Honorable Mention)
Rolling Stone	3.5/5 stars

Jo-Ann Greene of AllMusic said that "This is the kind of album that leaves the listener breathless with amazement", also stating that "It's a superb album, and deserved every accolade it received.

== Track listing ==
Voice of Jamaica track listing
No.	Title	Writer(s)	Producer(s)	Length
1.	"Searching"	Mark Myrie; Von Wayne Charles; Lowell Fillmore Dunbar; David Kelly	Sly Dunbar	4:14
2.	"Red Rose"	Myrie; Donovan Germain; Dunbar; Haldane Browne	Donovan Germain	3:55
3.	"Commitment" (featuring Wayne Wonder)	Myrie; Charles; Kelly	Dave Kelly	3:18
4.	"Deportees (Things Change)"	Myrie; Charles; Germain; Kelly	Donovan Germain	3:54
5.	"No Respect"	Myrie; Cleveland Browne; Wycliffe Johnson	Steely & Clevie	3:59
6.	"If Loving Was a Crime" (featuring Brian and Tony Gold)	Myrie; Michael Vincent Bennett	Mikey Bennett	4:53
7.	"Good Body"	Myrie; Harry A. Mudie	Bobby "Digital" Dixon	3:52
8.	"Wicked Act" (featuring Busta Rhymes)	Myrie; Trevor Smith	Busta Rhymes	3:52
9.	"Tribal War" (featuring Tony Rebel and Terry Ganzie)	Myrie; Patrick Barrett; Terry Ganzie; Earl Lowe	Donovan Germain	3:48
10.	"A Little More Time" (featuring Beres Hammond)	Myrie; Beres Hammond; David Heywood; Leroy Heywood	Donovan Germain	3:53
11.	"Him Take Off"	Myrie; C. Browne; Johnson	Steely & Clevie	3:38
12.	"Willy (Don't Be Silly)"	Myrie; Dunbar	Donovan Germain	4:54
13.	"Gone a Lead"	Myrie; C. Browne; Johnson	Steely & Clevie	3:41
14.	"Make My Day"	Myrie; Kelly	Dave Kelly	5:05
15.	"Operation Ardent"	Myrie; Germain; Dunbar; H. Browne	Donovan Germain	3:54
Total length:				61:40

2002 re-release bonus tracks
No.	Title	Writer(s)	Length
16.	"Vigilante"	Myrie; Clemente Dodd	4:01
17.	"Deportees (Things Change)" (Tan So Back Haul Up Mix)	Myrie; Charles; Germain; Kelly	4:01
Total length:			68:52

== Charts ==
Chart performance for Voice of Jamaica
Chart (1993–1994)	Peak position
US Billboard 200	159
US Top R&B/Hip-Hop Albums (Billboard)	29
US Reggae Albums (Billboard)	6
US Heatseekers Albums (Billboard)	5
