= Inna Heights =

Studio album by Buju Banton
- Released: November 18, 1997
- Genre: Dancehall; roots reggae
- Length: 1:02:22
- Label: Penthouse; VP Records
- Producer: Donovan Germain

Buju Banton chronology
'Til Shiloh (1995)	Inna Heights (1997)	Unchained Spirit (2000)

Professional ratings
Review scores
Source	Rating
AllMusic	4.5/5 stars
Robert Christgau	A−
The New Rolling Stone Album Guide	3.5/5 stars

Inna Heights is the fifth studio album by Jamaican dancehall reggae artist Buju Banton. It was released on November 18, 1997 through Penthouse Records. Production was handled by Donovan Germain. It features guest appearances from Beres Hammond, Jahmali, King Stitt, Ras Shiloh, Red Rat and Toots Hibbert. The album was nominated for a Grammy Award for Best Reggae Album at the 41st Annual Grammy Awards, but lost to Sly and Robbie's Friends.

== Track listing ==
No.	Title	Writer(s)	Length
1.	"Our Father in Zion"	Mark Myrie	0:28
2.	"Hills and Valleys"	Myrie	4:38
3.	"Inter Lingua"		0:23
4.	"Destiny"	Myrie	3:58
5.	"African Pride"	Myrie; Lowell Dunbar; Donald Dennis; Andrew Thomas; Steven "Lenky" Marsden	3:49
6.	"Cry No More"	Myrie; Dennis; Thomas; Marsden	3:59
7.	"My Woman Now" (featuring Beres Hammond)	Myrie; Beresford Hammond; Wayne Armond	4:08
8.	"Small Axe" (featuring King Stitt)		4:02
9.	"Inter Lingua"		0:24
10.	"Redder Than Red"		3:59
11.	"Single Parent"		3:53
12.	"Inter Lingua"		0:24
13.	"Give I Strength" (featuring Ras Shiloh)	Myrie; S. Lindo; Dennis; Dunbar	3:59
14.	"Close One Yesterday"	Myrie; S. Marley; Marsden; David Cole	4:00
15.	"Inter Lingua"		0:19
16.	"Love Dem Bad" (featuring Red Rat)	Myrie; Haldane Browne; Turner Wilson	4:08
17.	"Love Sponge"	Myrie; Clement Dodd	3:38
18.	"Inter Lingua"		0:22
19.	"Mother's Cry" (featuring Jah Mali)		3:47
20.	"54/46" (featuring Toots Hibbert)	Myrie; Frederick Hibbert	3:58
21.	"Circumstances"	Myrie	4:06
Total length:			1:02:22

== Charts ==
Chart (1997)	Peak position
US Reggae Albums (Billboard)	1
US Heatseekers Albums (Billboard)	34
