= Got to Get Away =

Got to Get Away may refer to:

- "Got to Get Away", a song by Alice Deejay from Who Needs Guitars Anyway?
- "Got to Get Away", a song by Bananarama from In Stereo
- "Got to Get Away", a song by Beres Hammond from Soul Reggae
- "Got to Get Away", a song by Easy Star All-Stars from Until That Day
- "Got to Get Away", a song by the Gap Band from The Gap Band
- "Got to Get Away", a song by Grinspoon from Alibis & Other Lies
- "Got to Get Away", a song by Hour Glass from Hour Glass
- "Got to Get Away", a song by Beggar and Co
- "Got to Get Away", a song by Camille Bob
- "Got to Get Away", a song by Jeff Coffey
- "Got to Get Away", a song by Jocelyn Brown
- "Got to Get Away", a song by The Stunning

== See also ==
- Gotta Get Away (disambiguation)
- I've Got to Get Away, the original title of The Killer by Stephen King
