= Mr. Mention =

Studio album by Buju Banton
- Released: 1992; June 8, 1993 (re-release)
- Genre: Dancehall
- Length: 53:35 (original release); 44:51 (re-release)
- Label: Penthouse Records (original release); PH 1997; Fader/PolyGram Records (re-release); 921 503
- Producer: Donovan Germain

Buju Banton chronology
Stamina Daddy (1992)	Mr. Mention (1992)	Voice of Jamaica (1993)

Mr. Mention is the second studio album by Jamaican dancehall reggae artist Buju Banton, released in 1992. When Banton signed with Mercury Records in 1993, PolyGram purchased the rights to the album and re-released it through Mercury's independently distributed Fader Records imprint with three fewer tracks and an explicit-lyrics sticker affixed to the album cover. The album was a commercial success, contributing to Buju Banton's rapid rise in popularity in the 1990s. Many of the album's songs went on to become club hits, most notably "Who Say", which features vocals from Beres Hammond.

The song "Batty Rider" appears in the videogame Grand Theft Auto: San Andreas soundtrack, on the fictional radio station K-Jah West.

== Music and lyrics ==
The album is a hardcore dancehall record where Banton showcases his signature heavy-voiced quips. His themes mainly revolve around his sexual desires and abilities, as well as his proficiency on the microphone.

== Critical reception ==
Professional ratings
Review scores
Source	Rating
AllMusic	3/5 stars

Ron Wynn of AllMusic gave a mixed review of the album, saying that "a couple of the CD's cuts are interesting. But thus far, it's hard to understand why he's so popular based on the content of his recordings".

== Track listing ==
Mr. Mention track listing
No.	Title	Length
1.	"Batty Rider"	3:57
2.	"Love How the Gal-Dem Flex"	3:40
3.	"Love Black Woman"	3:36
4.	"Look How You Sweet"	3:28
5.	"Woman No Fret"	3:43
6.	"Have to Get You Tonight"	3:13
7.	"Dickie"	3:45
8.	"Love Me Brownin'"	3:49
9.	"Buju Movin'"	3:41
10.	"Who Say" (with Beres Hammond)	4:05
11.	"The Grudge"	3:54
12.	"How the World a Run"	4:00
13.	"Buju Love You to the Max"	3:38
14.	"Man Fe Dead"	3:54
15.	"Bonafide Love" (with Wayne Wonder)	4:00
Total length:		57:06

Notes

- Tracks 11, 13, and 14 were not included on the Fader/PolyGram Records version of the album.
