= Mafia & Fluxy =

UK musical group

- Origin: London, England
- Genres: Lovers Rock, Reggae, soul, Ragga, Dancehall R&B, Conscious Roots Reggae, Dub
- Occupations: Producers, composers, musicians
- Years active: 1977–present
- Labels: Mafia & Fluxy
- Members: Leroy Heywood; David Heywood
- Website: www.mafiafluxy.com

Mafia & Fluxy are a British reggae rhythm section and production team, consisting of the brothers Leroy (bass) and David Heywood (drums), whose careers began with London reggae band The Instigators in 1977. They backed Jamaican artists on UK tours, and in 1987 visited Jamaica, building rhythm tracks for producers such as Bunny Lee, King Jammy,Mad Professor, Donovan Germain and Philip "Fatis" Burrell, becoming one of the most in-demand rhythm sections of the ragga age. They started their own label, producing for artists such as Sugar Minott, King Kong, Gregory Isaacs, Johnny Osbourne, Cornell Campbell and General Levy.

They produced a series of Reggae Heights albums featuring classic singers such as Johnny Clarke, Barry Brown, Gregory Isaacs and John Holt singing classic tracks over rhythms recreated by Mafia & Fluxy.

The duo have also remixed tracks for artists such as Janet Jackson. Leroy Mafia has also enjoyed a solo career.

== Discography ==
=== Solo albums ===
- A New Galaxy of Dub, Ariwa
- Revival Hits Vol. 1 (1992), Mafia & Fluxy
- Revival Hits Vol. 2 (1994), Mafia & Fluxy
- Mafia & Fluxy Present... (1994), RCA
- Revival Hits Vol. 3 (1994), Fashion. (1996), Mafia & Fluxy
- Mafia & Fluxy Presents: Reggae Mega Hits Vol. 1 (1995), BMG
- Dub Wicked: Michael Rose Meets Mafia & Fluxy at the Grass Roots of Dub (1997), Heartbeat
- Mafia & Fluxy (1998), Mafia & Fluxy
- Mafia & Fluxy Presents: Roots & Culture Vol. 1 (1999), Mafia & Fluxy
- Mafia & Fluxy Presents: Roots & Culture Vol. 2 (1998), Mafia & Fluxy
- Mafia & Fluxy Presents: Music for Lovers, Vol. 1 (1999), Mafia & Fluxy
- Introducing Lovers Revival Hits (1999), Distribution Fusion
- Revival Hits Vol. 4 (2000), Mafia & Fluxy
- Soul of the Gong (2000), Cactus
- Mafia & Fluxy Presents: Music for Lovers Vol. 2 (2000), Mafia & Fluxy
- Mafia & Fluxy Presents: Reggae Heights - John Holt (2001), Mafia & Fluxy
- Mafia & Fluxy Presents: Reggae Heights - Gregory Issacs (2001), Mafia & Fluxy
- Mafia & Fluxy Presents: Music for Lovers Vol. 3 (2001), Mafia & Fluxy
- Mafia & Fluxy Presents: Roots & Culture Vol. 3 (2001), Mafia & Fluxy
- Mad Professor Meets Mafia & Fluxy - Sci-Fi Dub Series, Pt. 1: From Mars with Dub (2002), Ariwa
- Entebbe Sounds Meets Mafia & Fluxy - Propa Dubwise Pt. 1 (2002), Entebbe Sounds
- Mafia & Fluxy Presents: Roots and Culture Vol. 4 (2002), Mafia & Fluxy
- Mafia & Fluxy Presents: Music for Lovers Vol. 4 (2002), Mafia & Fluxy
- Gussie P. Meets Mafia & Fluxy - Dub Wax: Book of Dub Vol. 1 (2003), Gussie P Records
- Gussie P. Meets Mafia & Fluxy - Dub Wax: Book of Dub Vol. 2 (2004), Gussie P Records
- A Reggae Christmas (2004), Mafia & Fluxy
- Mafia & Fluxy Presents: Strictly Vocals (2004), Mafia & Fluxy
- Entebbe Sounds Meets Mafia and Fluxy Propa Dubwise Pt. 1 (2004), Entebbe Sounds
- Mafia & Fluxy Presents: Music for Lovers Vol. 5 (2004), Mafia & Fluxy
- Mafia & Fluxy Presents: Music for Lovers Vol. 6 (2004), Mafia & Fluxy
- Hot It Up - R'N'B and Dancehall Mixes (2x LP) (2005), Mafia & Fluxy
- Mafia & Fluxy Presents: Roots and Culture Vol. 5 (200?), Mafia & Fluxy
- Mafia & Fluxy Presents: Roots and Culture Vol. 6 (2006), Mafia & Fluxy
- Mafia & Fluxy Presents: Strictly Vocals Vol. 2 (2006), Mafia & Fluxy
- Zion Riddim by Mafia and Fluxy (2006), Mafia & fluxy
- Mad Professor Meets Mafia & Fluxy - Sci-Fi Dub Series, Pt. 2: New Galaxy (2006), Ariwa
- Rocking Time Riddim by Mafia & Fluxy (2007), Heartbeat
- Borderline Riddim by Mafia & Fluxy (2007), Mafia & Fluxy
- From R&B to Reggae, Vol. 1 (2007), Mafia & Fluxy
- Mafia & Fluxy Presents: Reggae Heights - Barry Brown (2012) Mafia & Fluxy
- Mafia & Fluxy Presents: Reggae Heights - Johnny Clarke (2012) Mafia & Fluxy
- Mafia & Fluxy Presents: Strictly Vocals Vol. 3 (2012), Mafia & Fluxy
- Live and Love Riddim by Mafia & Fluxy (2012), Mafia & Fluxy
- Bun N Cheese Riddim by Mafia & Fluxy (2012), Mafia & Fluxy

=== Participated Albums ===
- Never Ending by Beres Hammond (2018), VP Records - Bass, Keyboards, Drums
