= Too Bad (album) =

Studio album by Buju Banton
- Released: September 12, 2006
- Genre: Dancehall
- Length: 55:38
- Label: Gargamel Records

Buju Banton chronology
Friends for Life (2003)	Too Bad (2006)	Rasta Got Soul (2009)

Too Bad is the eighth studio album by dancehall artist Buju Banton, released on September 12, 2006.

== Background and composition ==
Musically the album marks a comeback to straight hardcore dancehall music for Banton, that follows his departure to a more roots reggae direction. Critics defined the musical choice as "provocative" and a "screw you world" move following the controversy around his 1992 homophobic track "Boom Bye Bye" rearing its head again. He's dealt with the controversy for years, but the 2005 cancellations of some European shows seem to have been the "casus belli" for him, sparking in him the inspiration for Too Bad. According to Robert Christgau Banton on the album "skillfully skirts the crude sexism and gangsta-influenced posturing that are today's ragga norm. But that's not to say he's got a bunch of crossover smashes here -- fact is, he doesn't even have one".

== Critical reception ==
Professional ratings
Review scores
Source	Rating
AllMusic	3.5/5 stars
Robert Christgau	(3-star Honorable Mention)

David Jeffries of AllMusic commented on the album's musical direction saying that "So much dancehall will probably alienate the massive fanbase Banton earned with the versatile efforts 'Til Shiloh or Unchained Spirit, but longtime fans who miss the fire of his early work are going to go ape for this one." Robert Christgau said that "Banton's never released such a headlong album."

== Track listing ==
1. "Your Night Tonight"
2. "Try Offa Yah"
3. "Nothing"
4. "Too Bad"
5. "Waistline"
6. "Jig"
7. "Me & Ounu"
8. "'Til It Bend"
9. "Hey Boy"
10. "Go Slow"
11. "Driver"
12. "Girl U Know"
13. "Lonely Night"
14. "Who Have It"
15. "Better Day Coming"
16. "Don & Dupes" (featuring Pinchers)
17. "Fast Lane"

== Charts ==
Chart (2006)	Peak position
US Reggae Albums (Billboard)	6
