= One Love, One Life =

Studio album by Beres Hammond
- Released: November 13, 2012
- Genre: Reggae, lovers rock
- Label: VP Records
- Producer: Christopher Chin (exec), Beres Hammond (exec), Donovan Germaine, Collin "Bulby" York, Michael Fletcher

Beres Hammond chronology
A Moment in Time (2008)	One Love, One Life (2012)	Never Ending (2018)

One Love, One Life is the fifteenth studio album by the Jamaican reggae singer Beres Hammond, released as a double album on 13 November 2012 by VP Records. One Love, One Life consists of 20 songs and Hammond himself produced 19 out of 20 songs with various co-producers including Donovan Germain on "No Candle Light", Collin 'Bulby' York on "In My Arms", and Michael Fletcher on "More Time". The first disc, One Love features Hammond's distinctive classic lovers rock sounds, such as "No Candle Light", "In My Arms", and "Keep Me Warm". In contrast, the second disc concentrates on socially conscious and empowering tracks such as "You Stand Alone", "Truth Will Live On", and "Prime Time".

One Love, One Life was Hammond's first album in four years. In January 2014 it was nominated for a Grammy Award.

== Track listing ==
=== Disc 1 ===
No.	Title	Writer(s)	Producer(s)	Length
1.	"Can’t Waste No Time"	Hugh Hammond, Kirk Bennett, Robert Lyn	Beres Hammond	5:00
2.	"No Candle Light"	Hugh Beresford Hammond (Beres' Birth Name), Kirk Bennett, Steven Marsden, Aeion Hoilett, Ranoy Gordon, Donovan Germain	Beres Hammond, Donovan Germain	4:11
3.	"In My Arms"	Hugh Hammond, Collin York	Beres Hammond, Collin "Bulby" York	3:44
4.	"Crazy Dreams"	Hugh Hammond	Beres Hammond	4:23
5.	"Lonely Fellow"	Hugh Hammond, Howard Barrett, Tyrone Evans, John Holt	Beres Hammond	4:06
6.	"My Life"	Hugh Hammond	Beres Hammond	4:04
7.	"Keep Me Warm"	Hugh Hammond	Beres Hammond	3:37
8.	"More Time"	Hugh Hammond, Michael Fletcher	Beres Hammond, Michael Fletcher	4:32
9.	"Shouldn’t Be"	Hugh Hammond	Beres Hammond	4:19
10.	"The Song"	Hugh Hammond	Beres Hammond	4:13

=== Disc 2 ===
No.	Title	Writer(s)	Producer(s)	Length
1.	"Still Searching"	Hugh Hammond	Beres Hammond	3:51
2.	"Don’t You Feel Like Dancing"	Hugh Hammond	Beres Hammond	4:24
3.	"One Love, One Life"	Hugh Hammond, C. Manning	Beres Hammond	4:02
4.	"Can’t Make Blood Outta Stone"	Hugh Hammond	Beres Hammond	3:17
5.	"You Stand Alone"	Hugh Hammond, Clement Dodd	Beres Hammond	3:56
6.	"Not Made of Steel"	Hugh Hammond, Ivor Lindo	Beres Hammond	4:15
7.	"Family"	Hugh Hammond, Steven Marsden, Lowell Dunbar	Beres Hammond	4:11
8.	"The Truth Will Live On"	Hugh Hammond	Beres Hammond	4:56
9.	"Prime Time"	Hugh Hammond, Michael Fletcher	Beres Hammond	3:51
10.	"I Humble Myself"	Hugh Hammond	Beres Hammond	4:15

== Personnel ==
- Beres Hammond - vocals, producer, writer, keyboard
- Donovan Germain - writer, producer
- Kirk Bennett - writer, drums, percussion
- Steven Marsden - writer, keyboard
- Aeion Hoilett - writer
- Ranoy Gordon - writer
- Michael Fletcher - writer, producer, bass, drum, guitar
- Collin York - writer, producer, engineer
- Robbie Lyn - writer, bass, keyboard
- Dean Fraser - horn, saxophone
- Devario Jones - engineer
- Barry O'Hare - engineer
- Aeion Hoilett - bass
- Ranoy Gordon - guitar
- Kevino "Bunu" Elliot - engineer
- Steven Stanley - engineer
- Howard Barrett - writer
- Tyrone Evans - writer
- John Holt - writer
- Lowell "Sly" Dunbar - drum, percussion, writer
- Robbie Shakespeare - bass
- Winston "Bopee" Bowen - guitar
- Lloyd "Obeah" Denton - keyboard, drum
- Alvin Haughton - percussion
- Cherine Anderson - background vocals
- Shane Brown - engineer
- Romel Marshall - engineer
- Style Scott - drums
- Errol "Flabba" Holt - bass, percussion
- Robert Angus - guitar
- Christopher Birch - keyboard
- Michael Gayle - engineer
- Mitchum "Khan" Chin - guitar
- Dwight Dias - engineer
- Cegrica 'Soljie" Hamilton - engineer
- Trevor McKenzie - bass
- Joshua Mannings - keyboard
- Jimmy Peart - keyboard
- Errol "Minimum" Graham - percussion
- Errol Hird - saxophone
- Samuel Grant - trumpet
- Shaun Darson - drum
- Robert Browne - guitar
- Fabian Smith - keyboard
- Dione Watt - background vocal
- Dorrett Wisdom - background vocal
- Carol "Bowie" McLaughlin - keyboard
- Donald "Danny Bassie" Dennis - bass
- Dalton Browne - guitar
- Dwight Richards - trumpet
- Kenyatta - engineer
- Lloyd Parks - bass
- Ivor "Willie" Lindon - guitar, writer
- C. Manning - writer
- Clement Dodd - writer
- Nicola - background vocal
- Samantha Strachan - vocal
- Franklyn "Bubbler" Waul - keyboard
- Handel Tucker - keyboard
- Errol Brown - engineer
