= Born for Greatness =

Born for Greatness may refer to:

- "Born for Greatness" (song), a 2017 song by Papa Roach from their album Crooked Teeth
- Born for Greatness (album), a 2023 album by Buju Banton
