= Roy Francis =

Roy Francis is the name of:

- Roy Francis (rugby), Welsh rugby union and rugby league footballer, and coach
- Roy Francis (musician), Jamaican reggae musician and record producer
- Roy Francis (Royal Navy officer), naval officer and railwayman
