= Friends for Life (Buju Banton album) =

Studio album by Buju Banton
- Released: March 11, 2003
- Studio: Various: The Room for Black Shadow Records; Area 39 Recording Studio; Askum Recording Studio; Penthouse Recording Studio; King Jammy's Recording Studio
- Genre: Dancehall; reggae
- Length: 75:23
- Label: VP Records
- Producer: Buju Banton; Cool & Dre; Jammy "Jamz" James; Sheldon Stewart; Sly Dunbar; Steely & Clevie; Steven "Lenky" Marsden

Buju Banton chronology
Unchained Spirit (2000)	Friends for Life (2003)	Too Bad (2006)

Singles from Friends for Life
- 1. "Paid Not Played" Released: 2003

Friends for Life is the seventh studio album by Jamaican recording artist Buju Banton. It was released on March 11, 2003 through VP Music Group with exclusive distribution via Atlantic Records. Production was primarily handled by Donovan Germain and Buju Banton, along with Cool & Dre, Jammy "Jamz" James, Sheldon Stewart, Sly Dunbar, Steely & Clevie, Steven "Lenky" Marsden. It features guest appearances from Beres Hammond, Bounty Killer, Fat Joe, Nadine Sutherland, Sons & Daughters Choir and Wayne Wonder. The album peaked at number 198 on the US Billboard 200 album chart, and was nominated for Grammy Award for Best Reggae Album at the 46th Annual Grammy Awards, but lost to Sean Paul's Dutty Rock. The album was supported with charted single "Paid Not Played", which peaked at number 84 on the Official Singles Chart Top 100 in the UK.

== Critical reception ==
Professional ratings
Review scores
Source	Rating
AllMusic	3/5 stars
The Guardian	2/5 stars
The New Rolling Stone Album Guide	3/5 stars

Rick Anderson of AllMusic said that "This is not his best album by a long shot, but it does demonstrate his clear superiority to most of the dancehall pack". Dave Simpson, reviewer of The Guardian, saw the album as the biggest escalation of his positive side of music, saying: "Since 1995's well-regarded 'Til Shiloh, he has become known as Mr Positivity, and this album is the upper and worst example of that trite and withdrawn imagery", ending the review saying: "after a strong and rousing beginnings, Friends for Life gets lost in slush".

== Track listing ==
No.	Title	Writer(s)	Producer(s)	Length
1.	"Paid Not Played"	Mark Myrie; Troy Rami		4:01
2.	"Tra La La"	Myrie; Steven Marsden	Steven "Lenky" Marsden	3:24
3.	"Teaser" (featuring Bounty Killer)	Myrie; Rodney Price; Cleveland Browne; Wycliffe Johnson	Steely & Clevie	3:48
4.	"Excerpt of a Speech by Marcus Mosiah Garvey"			0:56
5.	"Up Ye Mighty Race"	Myrie	Buju Banton	4:02
6.	"All Will Be Fine" (featuring Sons and Daughters Choir)	Myrie; Frank Burt; Robbie Lyn; Mikey Chung	Donovan Germain	5:33
7.	"Maybe We Are"	Myrie; Burt; Lyn; Chung	Donovan Germain	6:20
8.	"Mama Africa"	Peter Tosh	Donovan Germain	4:47
9.	"Hooked on the Love"	Myrie; Browne; Johnson	Donovan Germain	3:58
10.	"Get It On" (featuring Wayne Wonder)	Myrie; Von Wayne Charles	Banton	3:30
11.	"Friend for Life"	Myrie; Marsden; Lowell Fillmore Dunbar	Banton	3:51
12.	"Good Times" (featuring Beres Hammond and Fat Joe)	Myrie; Hugh Hammond; Joseph Cartagena; Marsden; Dunbar	Donovan Germain	4:24
13.	"Damn"	Myrie; Andre Lyon; Marcello Valenzano	Cool & Dre	4:20
14.	"La Da De Da"	Myrie; Marsden	Banton	3:22
15.	"Feeling Groovy"	Myrie; Duke Reid	Donovan Germain	3:14
16.	"Pensive Mood"	Myrie	Banton	4:25
17.	"Spectacular"	Myrie	Jammy "Jamz" James	3:49
18.	"What Am I Gonna Do" (featuring Nadine Sutherland)	Myrie; Nadine Sutherland	Donovan Germain; Sly Dunbar	4:03
19.	"Mr. Nine"	Myrie; Gregory Isaacs	Sheldon Stewart	3:36
Total length:				1:15:23

== Charts ==
Chart (2003)	Peak position
US Billboard 200	198
US Top R&B/Hip-Hop Albums (Billboard)	44
US Reggae Albums (Billboard)	3
US Heatseekers Albums (Billboard)	14
