= The Chantells =

- Genres: Reggae
- Years active: 1975–1979
- Past members: Samuel Bramwell; Tommy Thomas; Lloyd Forrester

The Chantells were a Jamaican reggae group from the latter half of the 1970s.

Samuel Bramwell, Tommy Thomas and Lloyd Forrester started to record as a vocal harmony trio in 1975, for the producers Duke Reid and Clive Hunt.

Their collaboration with Roy Francis on his record label, Phase One, was the strongest part of their short career. The success of such singles such as "True Born African" or "Children of Jah", and their sole album, Waiting in the Park (featuring Jah Berry and U Brown) in 1978, made them one of the most promising soulful bands of this rockers reggae period. The Chantells were usually backed on their records by The Revolutionaries or by Lloyd Parks and his band Skin, Flesh and Bones, with King Tubby and Scientist engineering and producing. Toaster U Brown also featured on their release, Children of Jah.

The single How Can I Get Over, released by Sonia Pottinger on her High Note label, was a major success. The record had also been released earlier with attribution to Duke Reid, appearing on his renowned Treasure Isle label. By 1974, Sonia Pottinger had bought Duke Reid's studio and the rights to the releases on his label. The track was later released on a Heartbeat Records compilation entitled The Reggae Train : More Great Hits from the High Note Label. The group disbanded in 1979.

Vocalist Sam Bramwell made a number of powerful solo recordings for producer and label owner, Donovan Germain. One of Germain label's most well-known records on the sound system circuit in UK, especially on Jah Shaka sound, was Sam Bramwell's It aggo Dread Inna Babylon, which Bramwell recorded with The Revolutionaries. Effort in Yourself and Ruling Time have also proved to be a firm favourite from that time to the present time with the roots sound systems worldwide. Bramwell was killed in 1985 during a failed attempted robbery in Kingston.

A number of highly regarded compilations of their work have been released in recent years, solidifying their reputation as roots reggae and dub artists of innovation, originality and creativity : the most notable is The Chantells & Friends – Children of Jah 1977-1979, released by Blood and Fire in 1999, with extensive and well-researched sleeve notes from reggae historian, archivist and collector, Steve Barrow. In 2002 Motion Records released The Sound of Phase One, also focusing on Chantells rarities. The Chantells also featured on Motion Records King Tubby and Friends.

== See also ==
- List of reggae musicians
- Blood and Fire (record label)
