= From Then 'Til Now =

Studio album by Roots Architects
- Released: 3 May 2024
- Recorded: February and March 2017
- Studio: Mixing Lab Studio, Kingston, and Small World Studio, Kingston
- Length: 40:52
- Label: Fruits Records
- Producer: Mathias Liengme

From Then 'Til Now is an instrumental album by the musical project Roots Architects, released on Swiss label Fruits Records in May 2024. It features more than fifty Jamaican session musicians.

== Background and release ==
The Roots Architects project was created by Swiss keyboardist Mathias Liengme. He planned to record an album of veteran Jamaican session musicians, with each song evoking the in-house band of a classic reggae studio like The Upsetters at Black Ark, the Roots Radics of Channel One, or the Soul Syndicate of Studio One. In an interview with the Jamaica Observer, Liengme said that he "wanted to shed light on the crucial role of the session musicians in the history of the Jamaican music industry. Usually reggae history is told in terms of singers, producers, or engineers, but no one really pays attention to those who actually play the music."

In 2017 Liengme spent two months in Jamaica, working with session keyboardist Robbie Lyn to record the tracks for From Then 'Til Now. More than 50 musicians feature on the album. Seven of the tracks were recorded in a span of only six days. Several of the participating musicians died before the album was released in May 2024.

=== Dub version ===
In June 2025 Fruits Records released a dub version of the album entitled From Dub 'Til Now. The dubs were produced by Roberto Sánchez at the A-Lone Ark Studio in Santander. In a review for Mojo, David Katz wrote that "Sánchez's mix is hallmarked by attention to detail". Helmut Philipps called the dub album "artwork, that speaks for itself.

== Critical reception ==
Professional ratings
Review scores
Source	Rating
Mojo	4/5 stars

David Katz wrote that "the players keep the action on-point throughout, and the unhurried nature of the sessions has yielded something inspired and organic." Steve Barker of The Wire called the album "a joyful affair", with the musicians "clearly enjoying the freedom to do exactly what they love." In Riddim magazine, René Wynands wrote "the old men have reawakened their old mastery and...have recorded incredibly fresh tunes."

== Track listing ==
No.	Title	Length
1.	"1000 Light Years"	3:56
2.	"In The Shadow"	4:41
3.	"Whitewater"	4:33
4.	"Memories of Old"	4:12
5.	"Rose Hall's Birds"	4:19
6.	"Squirrel Inna Barrel"	4:31
7.	"Under The Cotton Tree"	4:46
8.	"45 Charles Street"	4:31
9.	"Everlasting Love"	5:19
Total length:		40:52

All songs were composed and arranged by Mathias Liengme, except "Everlasting Love" which was composed by Errol Kong and arranged by Mathias Liengme. The horns arrangement on "In The Shadow" is by Vin Gordon, Glen DaCosta and Mathias Liengme, and that on "Rose Hall's Birds" is by Glen DaCosta and Mathias Liengme.

== Personnel ==
Roots Architects

- Drums – Sly Dunbar, Leroy "Horsemouth" Wallace, Mikey "Boo" Richards, Fil Callender, Stanley "Barnabas" Bryan, Albert "Ilawi" Malawi
- Bass – Robbie Shakespeare, Lloyd Parks, Boris Gardiner, Jackie Jackson, Errol "Flabba Holt" Carter, Christopher Meredith, Howard "Spred" Bedasse
- Keyboards – Robbie Lyn, Ansel Collins, Michael "Ibo" Cooper, Tyrone Downie, Franklyn "Bubbler" Waul, Bernard "Touter" Harvey, Tony "Asher" Brissett, Dennis "Jah D" Fearon, Lloyd "Obeah" Denton, Mathias Liengme
- Guitars – Ernest Ranglin, Radcliffe "Dougie" Bryan, Michael "Mao" Chung, Dwight Pinkney, Winston "Bo Pee" Bowen, Stephen "Cat" Coore, Dalton Browne, Fil Callender, David "Little David" Trail, Leebert "Gibby" Morrisson, Papis "Peace" Diouf, Josu Santamaria
- Percussion – Bongo Joe, Christopher "Sky Juice" Burth, Harry T, Derrick Stewart, Alvin Haughton, Bongo Herman, Alphonso Craig, Joseph "Junior Congo" Sutherland, Mathias Liengme
- Horns section – Vin Gordon, Karl "Cannonball" Bryan, Glen DaCosta, Dean Fraser, Calvin "Bubbles" Cameron, Llewellyn "Lew" Chang, Arnold Brackenridge, Sting Wray, Everald Gayle, Dwight Richards, Sheldon "ATiiBA" Bernard, Claude "Jah See" Jordan

Technical

- Recording – Hasani "Snych" Williams (Mixing Lab Studio, Kingston) and Perry Hendricks and Gaylard Bravo (Small World Studio, Kingston)
- Additional recording – Michael "Ibo" Cooper (Grafton Studio, Kingston), Bernard "Touter" Harvey (Circle House Studio, Miami), Stew Crooks (Dining Room Studio, Toronto), and Mathias Liengme (Bridge Studio, Geneva)
- Prophet 12 programming – Thomas Tiercy
- Mixing – Roberto Sánchez (A-Lone Ark Muzik Studio, Santander)
- Mastering – Adi Flück (Centraldubs, Bern)

Artistic

- Liner notes – Angus Taylor
- Photography – Liza Mazur
- Artwork – J. Bonner
