= Never Ending (album) =

Studio album by Beres Hammond
- Released: October 12, 2018
- Studio: Harmony House
- Genres: Reggae, Lovers rock, roots reggae
- Length: 57:09
- Labels: VP Records, Harmony House Records
- Producers: Christopher Chin (exec), Beres Hammond (exec), Kurt Riley, Andre Riley

Beres Hammond chronology
One Love, One Life (2012)	Never Ending (2018)

Singles from Never Ending
- 1. "I'm Alive" Released: May 18, 2018; 2. "Land of Sunshine" Released: August 31, 2018

Never Ending is reggae artist Beres Hammond's nineteenth studio album, released on October 12, 2018. It debuted at number one on the Billboard Reggae chart. The 14-track album was recorded in Kingston, Jamaica.

== Background ==
Themes on the album include love, overcoming obstacles and celebrating life. Never Ending includes a love song about Jamaica called "Land of Sunshine." The lead single, "I'm Alive", is a 21st-century 'roots' track with Hammond singing praises for life's simple and essential joys. "My Kinda Girl" is an example of modern lovers rock – a sub genre of reggae for which the artist is known. Hammond is known to be in the studio three or four times a week when he is in Jamaica. He records songs based on events that happen naturally in life. He is known to visit people - whom he does not know – but who enjoy sharing stories about their lives with him. He internalizes those experiences and records them in song.

The visual for the "Never Ending" music video was directed by RD Studios and portrays Hammond's childhood. Fans are shown the beginning of his love for music to his current-day performing in front of Harmony House – his recording studio on Dumbarton Avenue. Throughout the four-minute video, artistes influenced by Hammond make a cameo. They include Jah Cure, Alborosie, Romain Virgo, Christopher Martin, Shenseea, Jesse Royal, Bulby York, Kurt Riley, and Teflon Zinc Fence.

== Track listing ==
#	Title	Producer(s)	Composer(s)	Time
1	"I'm Alive"	Beres Hammond	Hugh Hammond, Willie Lindo	3:20
2	"Land of Sunshine"	Beres Hammond	Hugh Hammond	4:03
3	"I Will Take You There"	Beres Hammond	Hugh Hammond	4:03
4	"Only One"	Beres Hammond	Hugh Hammond	3:57
5	"My Kinda Girl"	Kurt Riley & Andre Riley	Hugh Hammond, Kurt Riley, Michael Fletcher, Andre Riley	4:15
6	"Sleeping Beauty"	Beres Hammond	Hugh Hammond	4:18
7	"Hold You Till It Hurts"	Beres Hammond	Hugh Hammond, Willie Lindo	4:03
8	"Seasons Change"	Beres Hammond	Hugh Hammond	4:07
9	"All Love"	Beres Hammond	Hugh Hammond	4:14
10	"I'll Try"	Beres Hammond	Hugh Hammond, David Heywood, Leroy Heywood	4:00
11	"Love Foreclosure"	Beres Hammond	Hugh Hammond	4:22
12	"Lose It All"	Beres Hammond	Hugh Hammond	3:51
13	"Survival"	Beres Hammond	Hugh Hammond	4:11
14	"Never Ending"	Beres Hammond	Hugh Hammond	4:25

== Personnel ==
- Andre Riley - Producer
- Barry O'Hare - Mixing Engineer
- Beres Hammond - Executive Producer, Primary Artist, Producer, Vocals (Background)
- Billy Lawrence - Percussion
- Carroll "Bowie" McLaughlin - Keyboards
- Christina Chin - Art Direction, Creative Director
- Christopher Birch - Keyboards, Piano
- Christopher Chin - Executive Producer
- Christopher Scott - Mastering
- Collin "Bulby" York - Mixing Engineer
- Danny "Axeman" Thompson - Bass
- Dave "Fluxy" Heywood - Drums
- Dave Heywood - Composer
- Dean Fraser - Horn
- Deron James - Production Art
- Devario Jones - Engineer
- Donaldson Bernard - Keyboards
- Dorrett Wisdom - Vocals (Background)
- Dwain "Wiya" Campbell-Fletcher - Keyboards
- Dwight Richards - Horn
- Errol Brown - Mixing Engineer
- Errol Graham - Percussion
- Errol Carter - Bass
- Franklin Waul - Keyboards
- Gregory Morris - Mixing Engineer
- Handel Tucker - Keyboards
- Heather Cummings - Vocals (Background)
- Hugh Hammond - Composer
- Jordan Morris - Photography
- Kenyatta Hill - Engineer
- Kirk Bennett - Drums
- Kurt Riley - Composer, Producer
- Lamont “Monty” Savory - Guitar
- Lerory "Mafia" Heywood - Bass, Keyboards
- Leroy Heywood - Composer
- Lloyd Denton - Drums, Keyboards, Piano
- Michael Fletcher - Bass, Composer
- Michael Gayle - Engineer
- Mitchum Chin - Guitar
- Neil "Diamond" Edwards - A&R
- Rebecca Lovinsquy - Graphic Design, Logo
- Richard Brown - Engineer
- Richard Lue - Project Manager
- Robbie Lyn - Keyboards
- Robert Angus - Guitar
- Sly Dunbar - Drums
- Solomon Salmon - Engineer
- Stephanie Chin - Art Direction, Creative Director
- Steven Stanley - Mixing Engineer
- Style Scott - Drums
- Tony Phillips - Guitar
- Trevor McKenzie - Bass
- Willie Lindo - Guitar
- Winston "Bo Peep" Bowen - Guitar

== Never Ending Tour ==
Never Ending Tour 2019 of the United States and Canada started on July 27 from Danbury Connecticut, U.S.A., and stopped in Baltimore, Cincinnati, Chicago, Boston, Toronto, Brooklyn, Philadelphia, Newark, Huntington (New York), Richmond (Virginia), Washington DC, Norfolk (Virginia), Charlotte (North Carolina), Atlanta, Orlando, and Fort Lauderdale.

Never Ending Tour 2019 Schedule

Date	Venue	Performing Artist(s)	State
Saturday - July 27	Ives Concert Park	Beres Hammond, Maxi Priest, Yellowman	Danbury, CT
Sunday - July 28	Lake Clifton Park	Beres Hammond, Capleton, Shenseea, Bunji Garlin, Ding Dong	Baltimore, MD
Tuesday - July 30	Riverfront Live	Beres Hammond	Cincinnati, OH
Wednesday - July 31	Patio Theater	Beres Hammond	Chicago, IL
Friday - August 2	Woodbine Racetrack	Beres Hammond	Toronto, ON
Sunday - August 4	Ford Amphitheater	Beres Hammond, Maxi Priest, Romain Virgo	Brooklyn, NY
Tuesday - August 6	Payomet PAC	Beres Hammond	Truro, MA
Wednesday - August 7	House of Blues	Beres Hammond	Boston, MA
Friday - August 9	Theater of Living Arts	Beres Hammond	Philadelphia, PA
Saturday - August 10	NJPAC	Beres Hammond, Maxi Priest, Romain Virgo	Newark, NJ
Sunday - August 11	The Paramount	Beres Hammond	Huntington, NY
Tuesday - August 13	The National	Beres Hammond	Richmond, VA
Thursday - August 15	Howard Theatre	Beres Hammond	Washington, D.C.
Friday - August 16	Howard Theatre	Beres Hammond	Washington, D.C.
Saturday - August 17	The Norva	Beres Hammond	Norfolk, VA
Sunday - August 18	Oasis Shriners Auditorium	Beres Hammond, Romain Virgo	Charlotte, NC
Friday - August 23	Cobb Energy PAC	Beres Hammond	Atlanta, GA
Saturday - August 24	The Hard Rock	Beres Hammond	Orlando, FL
Sunday - August 25	Broward PAC	Beres Hammond	Lauderdale, FL
