= Gotta Get Away =

Gotta Get Away may refer to:

- "Gotta Get Away" (The Offspring song)
- "Gotta Get Away" (The Black Keys song)
- "Gotta Get Away" (Sweethearts of the Rodeo song)
- "Gotta Get Away", a song by Robbie Glover
- "Gotta Get Away", a B-side to the US release of "As Tears Go By" by The Rolling Stones

== See also ==
- Got to Get Away (disambiguation)
- "Gotta Gettaway", a song by Stiff Little Fingers from the album Nobody's Heroes, 1980
