= Rasta Got Soul =

Studio album by Buju Banton
- Released: April 21, 2009
- Genre: Reggae
- Label: Gargamel Music
- Producer: Buju Banton; Donovan Germain; Tracii McGregor; Wyclef Jean

Buju Banton chronology
Too Bad (2006)	Rasta Got Soul (2009)	Before the Dawn (2010)

Singles from Rasta Got Soul
- 1. "Magic City" Released: February 21, 2005

Professional ratings
Review scores
Source	Rating
AllMusic	4/5 stars
laut.de	4/5 stars

Rasta Got Soul is the ninth studio album by Jamaican dancehall reggae artist Buju Banton. It was released on April 21, 2009 via Gargamel Music. The album features the hit single "Magic City".

At the 52nd Annual Grammy Awards, the album was nominated for a Grammy Award for Best Reggae Album, but lost to Stephen Marley's acoustic version of Mind Control.

== Track listing ==
No.	Title	Length
1.	"Hurt Us No More"	5:28
2.	"Magic City"	5:13
3.	"I Rise"	5:10
4.	"Rastafari"	6:03
5.	"I Wonder"	4:44
6.	"A Little Bit of Sorry"	4:01
7.	"Affairs of the Heart"	4:15
8.	"Lend a Hand"	4:54
9.	"Optimistic Soul"	4:15
10.	"Make You Mine"	5:11
11.	"Mary"	4:09
12.	"Bedtime Story" (featuring Wyclef Jean)	4:09
13.	"Sense of Purpose" (featuring Third World)	4:07
14.	"Be on Your Way"	3:33
15.	"Lights Out"	4:57

Bonus track
No.	Title	Length
16.	"Mirror"

== Charts ==
Chart (2009)	Peak position
US Heatseekers Albums (Billboard)	38
US Reggae Albums (Billboard)	2
