= Roy Francis (musician) =

Jamaican record producer

- Genres: reggae
- Occupation: Record Producer

Roy Francis is a Jamaican record producer.

He started his Phase One label in 1977, recording The Chantells, Lopez Walker, Errol Davis, Steve Boswell, Jah Berry, The Terrors, The Heptones, and Dean Fraser.

As a songwriter he co-composed "Thief" as recorded by Yellowman in 1991, and "Poor and Simple" by Luciano in 1993.

== Partial discography ==
Compilation album

- We Are Getting Bad : The Sound Of Phase One - Motion Records

== See also ==
- List of Jamaican record producers
