= Soul Reggae =

Album by Beres Hammond

Studio album by Beres Hammond
- Released: 1976
- Recorded: Aquarius Sound Studios
- Genre: Roots reggae, lovers rock, soul
- Label: Water Lily
- Producer: Willie Lindo

Beres Hammond chronology
Soul Reggae (1976)	Let's Make a Song (1981)

Soul Reggae is the debut album by Beres Hammond, released in 1976.

== Track listing ==
Soul Reggae has 12 tracks.

1. "You Don't Have to Lie"
2. "Oh Take Me Girl"
3. "My Whole World"
4. "Don't Wait Too Long"
5. "Somebody Lied"
6. "Is This the Right Way?"
7. "I'll Never Change"
8. "Got to Get Away"
9. "Smile"
10. "Your Love Won't Shine"
11. "One Step Ahead"
12. "Oh I Miss You"

== Personnel ==
- Beres Hammond - vocals
- Clarence Wears, Robert Johnson, Willie Lindo - guitar
- Art McLead, Val Douglas - bass
- Michael Richards - drums
- Tyrone Downie, Harold Butler, Earl "Wire" Lindo, Robert Lyn - keyboards
- Cedric Brooks - congas
- Carlton Samuels, Cedric Brooks, Glen DaCosta - saxophone
- David Maden, Jackie Willacy, Nathan Breckenridge - trumpet
- Joe McCormack - trombone
- Jackie Willacy - flugelhorn
- Cynthia Richards, Cynthia Schloss, Ernest Wilson, Merlyn Brooks - background vocals
