= Unchained Spirit =

Studio album by Buju Banton
- Released: 2000
- Studios: Penthouse; Aksum; Idea Lounge
- Genres: Dancehall; roots reggae
- Length: 1:03:54
- Labels: ANTI-; Epitaph Records
- Producers: Buju Banton; Dean Fraser; Donovan Germain; Tyrone Downie; Stephen Marley; Steven Marsden; Tony "CD" Kelly

Buju Banton chronology
Inna Heights (1997)	Unchained Spirit (2000)	Friends For Life (2003)

Unchained Spirit is the sixth studio album by Jamaican musician Buju Banton. It was released in 2000 via ANTI-/Epitaph Records, marking it his only album for the label. It as produced by Donovan Germain, Steven Marsden, Tony "CD" Kelly, Dean Fraser, Tyrone Downie, Stephen Marley, and Banton. It features guest appearances from Beres Hammond, Gramps Morgan, LMS, Luciano, Rancid, Stephen Marley, and Wayne Wonder.

The album peaked at number 128 on the Billboard 200, number 5 on the Independent Albums and number 2 on the Reggae Albums charts. It made it to number 40 on the UK Official Independent Albums Chart.

== Critical reception ==
Professional ratings
Review scores
Source	Rating
AllMusic	4.5/5 stars
Robert Christgau	(neither)
The Encyclopedia of Popular Music	4/5 stars
The Evening Post	3/5 stars
NME	2.5/5 stars
Now	2/5 Ns
(The New) Rolling Stone Album Guide	3.5/5 stars
Spin	7/10

David Dacks of Exclaim! wrote that "the treacle far outstrips anything resembling a tuff rhythm here ... even over the good rhythms, Buju doesn't seem to have the command he once did". Rohan Preston of The Minnesota Star Tribune thought that "Buju's grainy voice flows over slowly distilled lattices of rhythms and multi-part South African-style harmonies". M.F. DiBella of AllMusic defined the album as a "a vital and rhythmic mix of homegrown Jamaican philosophy, biblical harmonizing, and just plain eerie dancehall".

== Track listing ==
No.	Title	Writer(s)	Length
1.	"Intro"	Traditional	0:39
2.	"23rd Psalm" (featuring Gramps Morgan)	Traditional	5:44
3.	"Voice of Jah" (featuring LMS)	Mark Myrie; Morgan Heritage	5:01
4.	"Sudan"	Myrie	4:41
5.	"We'll Be Alright" (featuring Luciano)	Myrie; Jepther McClymont	4:24
6.	"Pull It Up" (featuring Beres Hammond)	Myrie; Hugh Beresford Hammond; Clement Dodd	4:09
7.	"Life Is a Journey"	Myrie	4:07
8.	"Better Must Come"	Myrie; Dodd; Delroy Reid; Don Drummond	4:12
9.	"Mighty Dread"	Myrie	5:01
10.	"Poor Old Man" (featuring Stephen Marley)	Myrie; Stephen Marley	4:26
11.	"Law & Order"	Myrie	3:51
12.	"Guns & Bombs"	Myrie; Anthony Kelly; Steven Marsden	3:20
13.	"Woman Dem Phat"	Myrie; Kelly	3:16
14.	"No More Misty Days" (featuring Rancid)	Myrie; Tim Armstrong; Marsden; Lowell Dunbar; Lars Frederiksen	4:01
15.	"Pull It Up (Live in Concert)" (featuring Beres Hammond)	Myrie; Hammond; Dodd	2:56
16.	"Reunion" (featuring Wayne Wonder)	Myrie; Vonwayne Charles; Marsden	4:06
Total length:			1:03:54

== Charts ==
Chart (2000)	Peak position
UK Independent Albums (Official Charts)	40
US Billboard 200	128
US Independent Albums (Billboard)	5
US Reggae Albums (Billboard)	2
