= 'Til Shiloh =

Studio album by Buju Banton
- Released: July 18, 1995
- Recorded: 1994–1995
- Studios: Cell Block Recording Studio, Kingston, Jamaica; Digital Recording Studio, Kingston, Jamaica; Giant Studios, New York City; Penthouse Recording Studio, Kingston, Kingston, Jamaica; Studio 2000, Kingston, Jamaica
- Genres: Roots reggae; dancehall
- Length: 64:35
- Labels: Loose Cannon; Island
- Producers: Donovan Germain; Lisa Cortes; Bobby "Digital" Dixon; Dave Kelly; Sylvester Gordon; Steely & Clevie

Buju Banton chronology
Voice of Jamaica (1993)	'Til Shiloh (1995)	Inna Heights (1997)

Singles from 'Til Shiloh
- 1. "Murderer" Released: 1994; 2. "Wanna Be Loved" Released: 1995; 3. "Champion (Remix)" Released: 1995; 4. "Untold Stories" Released: 1995

'Til Shiloh is the fourth album by Jamaican dancehall artist Buju Banton, released in 1995 by Loose Cannon Records, a short-lived subsidiary of Island Records. In 2019 the album was certified gold by the Recording Industry Association of America (RIAA).

The album marked a significant change in Banton's artistry, going to a direction closer to roots reggae. 'Til Shiloh was widely acclaimed by critics, and is considered to be a classic album for reggae music.

== Music and lyrics ==
"Til I'm Laid to Rest"
A sample the album's opener, "Til I'm Laid to Rest".

'Til Shiloh was described as an introspective record. Its themes mainly explore Buju's then newfound faith in the Rastafari movement, with songs such as "Til I'm Laid to Rest", and "Untold Stories". This could be seen as a transition from the rude-bwoy style, made of glorifications of gun violence, to a more roots-oriented fashion. Jo-Ann Greene of AllMusic said that the album "consolidated his move into social awareness and adopted a more mature, reflective tone that signaled Banton's arrival as an artist able to make major creative statements".

The title track, which opened the album, was based on an introduction Banton had used in live shows. According to producer Donovan Germain, "'Til Shiloh mean forever."

The track "Untold Stories" was later covered by Sinéad O'Connor on her 2005 reggae album Throw Down Your Arms.

== Critical reception ==
Professional ratings
Review scores
Source	Rating
AllMusic	4.5/5 stars
The Guardian	5/5 stars
NME	6/10
Pitchfork	9.4/10
Q	4/5 stars
The Rolling Stone Album Guide	4.5/5 stars
The Village Voice	A−

Angus Taylor of BBC Music commented that "this is a very listenable landmark, which reminds us that while lyrical topics may differ, musically, reggae is one". AllMusic's reviewer Jo-Ann Greene said that "this is a gentler album than its predecessor, although still very much in a dancehall style. Another masterpiece". Robert Christgau stated that the record is "The most fully accomplished reggae album since the prime of Black Uhuru", praising "how he perfectly articulates empathy, vulnerability, and concern".

The album was listed in the 1999 book The Rough Guide: Reggae: 100 Essential CDs.

== Reissues ==
In 2002 the album an expanded and remastered edition was released on Island/IDJMG/Universal Records, featuring the tracks "Sensemilia Persecution" and "Rampage".

In 2020, the album was reissued on its 25th anniversary on December 18, including remixes of "Not an Easy Road", "Wanna Be Loved" and an unreleased track called "Come Inna The Dance" as bonus tracks.

== Commercial performance ==
On the issue dated August 5, 1995, Til Shiloh debuted at number 148 on the US Billboard 200 chart. The album also debuted at number 27 on the US Top R&B/Hip-Hop Albums chart. The album was eventually certified gold by the Recording Industry Association of America (RIAA) for streams and sales equating to 500,000 units in the United States.

== Track listing ==
'Til Shiloh track listing
No.	Title	Writer(s)	Length
1.	"Shiloh"	Myrie	0:19
2.	"'Til I'm Laid to Rest"	Dixon, Myrie	4:24
3.	"Murderer"	Dodd, Myrie	3:56
4.	"Champion"	Myrie, Sibbles	3:59
5.	"Untold Stories"	Germain, Myrie, Tucker	4:36
6.	"Not an Easy Road"	Myrie	4:01
7.	"Only Man"	Kelly, Myrie	2:51
8.	"Complaint" (with Garnett Silk)		4:01
9.	"Chuck It So"	Myrie, Tucker, Tyrell	3:57
10.	"How Could You"	Dodd, Myrie	3:56
11.	"Wanna Be Loved"	Browne, Kelly, Myrie	4:05
12.	"It's All Over"	Browne, Johnson, Myrie	4:05
13.	"Hush, Baby, Hush"	Myrie, Williams	4:21
14.	"What Ya Gonna Do?" (with Wayne Wonder)		3:43
15.	"Rampage"		3:46
16.	"Sensemilia Persecution"		4:03
17.	"Champion" (remix)	Ice Cube, Life, Myrie, QDIII, Sibbles, Wansel	4:32
Total length:			64:35

== Personnel ==
- Wayne Wonder – vocals
- Buju Banton – vocals
- Garnett Silk – performer
- 2 Friends Crew – backing vocals
- Carlton Batts – mastering
- Dalton Browne – guitar
- Glen Browne – acoustic guitar
- Junior Chin – trumpet
- Clevie – drums, producer
- Lisa Cortes – executive producer, editing
- Bobby Digital – producer, engineer
- Sly Dunbar – drums
- Dean Fraser – saxophone
- Donovan Germain – producer, executive producer
- Sylvester Gordon – producer, engineer, mixing engineer
- Marcia Griffiths – backing vocals
- Leroy Mafia – keyboards
- Gary Jackson – assistant engineer
- Robert Lyn – keyboards
- Steely – bass guitar, keyboards, producer, mixing engineer
- Gary Sutherland – engineer
- Andrew Thomas – engineer, assistant engineer
- Handel Tucker – drums, keyboards
- Andre "Dreddy Ranks" Tyrell – drums, producer, engineer
- Lloyd "Gitsy" Willis – keyboards
- Junior "Left Toe" Don – bass guitar
- Mikey Williamson – engineer
- Prince Charles Alexander – remix
- Tony Kelly – mixing engineer
- Drew Lavyne – editing
- Geoffroy de Boismenu – photography
- Clive Allen – cover photo
- Dave Fluxy – drums

== Charts ==
Chart performance for 'Til Shiloh
Chart (1995)	Peak position
Canada Top Albums/CDs (RPM)	18
US Billboard 200	148
US Top R&B/Hip-Hop Albums	27
US Top Reggae Albums	2

== Certifications ==
Certifications for 'Til Shiloh
Region	Certification	Certified units/sales
United States (RIAA)	Gold	500,000^{‡}
^{‡} Sales+streaming figures based on certification alone.
