= Before the Dawn (Buju Banton album) =

Studio album by Buju Banton
- Released: September 28, 2010
- Genre: Reggae
- Length: 45:13
- Label: Gargamel

Buju Banton chronology
Rasta Got Soul (2009)	Before the Dawn (2010)	Upside Down 2020 (2020)

Professional ratings
Review scores
Source	Rating
AllMusic	3.5/5 stars

Before the Dawn is reggae and dancehall artist Buju Banton's tenth studio album. It was released on September 28, 2010. This album was recorded at the artist's own Gargamel Music studio in Kingston, Jamaica. The album was Buju's last release before he was found guilty of federal drug charges.

The album won a Grammy Award in the Best Reggae Album category in 2011.

== Track listing ==
No.	Title	Length
1.	"Rasta Can't Go"	4:31
2.	"In the Air"	3:35
3.	"Do Good"	6:59
4.	"Battered & Bruised"	4:08
5.	"Bondage"	5:15
6.	"Struggle Together"	4:32
7.	"Life"	5:03
8.	"No Smoking at All"	3:26
9.	"Try Life"	4:10
10.	"Innocent"	3:34
Total length:		45:13

== Charts ==
Chart performance for Before the Dawn
Chart (2010)	Peak position
US Heatseekers Albums (Billboard)	26
US Reggae Albums (Billboard)	2
