= Upside Down 2020 =

Studio album by Buju Banton
- Released: June 26, 2020
- Genre: Reggae; dancehall
- Length: 72:00
- Label: Gargamel Music, Roc Nation

Buju Banton chronology
Before the Dawn (2010)	Upside Down 2020 (2020)	Born for Greatness (2023)

Upside Down 2020 is reggae and dancehall artist Buju Banton's eleventh studio album. It was released on June 26, 2020, through Gargamel Music and Roc Nation. The album is Buju's first release after his prison release.

The song "Unity" is featured on the FIFA 21 soundtrack.

== Critical reception ==
Professional ratings
Review scores
Source	Rating
The Guardian	4/5 stars
Mojo	3/5 stars
Rolling Stone	4/5 stars
The Times	2/5 stars

Danny Schwarz of Rolling Stone gave the album four stars out of five, praising the album for its content by saying "from the political sermons tracks to the love songs, he sounds spry and engaged. It's like he never left." Damien Morris of The Guardian also gave the album four stars out of five, saying that Banton is "as good as he's ever been". Will Hodgkinson of The Times however gave the album a negative review, giving it two stars out of five by stating that the body of work is "beautiful moments, but not a great comeback."

== Track listing ==
Upside Down 2020 track listing
No.	Title	Length
1.	"Lamb of God"	2:43
2.	"Yes Mi Friend" (featuring Stephen Marley)	4:14
3.	"Buried Alive"	3:52
4.	"Blessed"	3:24
5.	"Memories" (featuring John Legend)	4:01
6.	"Lovely State of Mind"	4:06
7.	"Appreciated"	3:13
8.	"Trust"	3:06
9.	"Cherry Pie" (featuring Pharrell Williams)	3:35
10.	"Beat Dem Bad"	3:22
11.	"Good Time Girl"	3:15
12.	"Call Me" (featuring Stefflon Don)	3:50
13.	"Moonlight Love"	3:13
14.	"Cheated"	2:53
15.	"Steppa"	3:25
16.	"The World Is Changing"	3:54
17.	"400 Years"	4:08
18.	"Rising Up"	4:24
19.	"Helping Hand"	3:52
20.	"Unity"	3:45
Total length:		72:00

== Charts ==
Chart performance for Upside Down 2020
Chart (2020)	Peak position
US Heatseekers Albums (Billboard)	3
US Reggae Albums (Billboard)	2
US Top Album Sales (Billboard)	27
US Top Tastemaker Albums (Billboard)	23
