= Born for Greatness (album) =

Studio album by Buju Banton
- Released: September 8, 2023
- Genre: Reggae; dancehall
- Length: 56:00
- Label: Gargamel Music; Roc Nation; Def Jam

Buju Banton chronology
Upside Down 2020 (2020)	Born for Greatness (2023)

Born for Greatness is the twelfth studio album by reggae and dancehall artist Buju Banton, released on September 8, 2023, through Gargamel Music and Roc Nation. It includes features from Victoria Monét, Stephen Marley and Snoop Dogg.

== Background ==
Banton called the album "an ode to those who acknowledge the struggles and challenges that surmount. And others who will, your eyes are not deceiving you nor are your ears, you were born for greatness. I embrace you with love melodies and music."

== Critical reception ==
Professional ratings
Review scores
Source	Rating
Pitchfork	6.7/10

Edwin Houghton of Pitchfork wrote that while Born for Greatness "doesn't match the magic of his legacy", when Banton is "not exploring grandiose thematic statements, he sounds as confident and impressive as ever". Vibe's Preezy Brown called "Nuff Love for You" and "We Find a Way" "solo standouts" and the album "a varied and enticing return".

== Track listing ==
Born for Greatness track listing
No.	Title	Length
1.	"Ageless Time"	3:36
2.	"Life Choices"	2:53
3.	"Born for Greatness"	2:58
4.	"Coconut Wata (Sip)"	3:05
5.	"Yard and Outta Road"	3:10
6.	"Body Touching Body" (featuring Victoria Monét)	2:37
7.	"Turn Up Tonight"	2:34
8.	"Sweeter"	3:15
9.	"Feel a Way" (featuring Stephen Marley)	3:29
10.	"Plans"	3:04
11.	"Nuff Love for You"	3:42
12.	"Walked Out"	3:29
13.	"We Find a Way"	2:57
14.	"My Microphone"	4:17
15.	"High Life" (with Snoop Dogg)	3:40
16.	"Trial by Fire"	3:35
17.	"Let My People Go"	3:53
Total length:		56:00
