= Buju Banton =

Jamaican dancehall musician (born 1973)

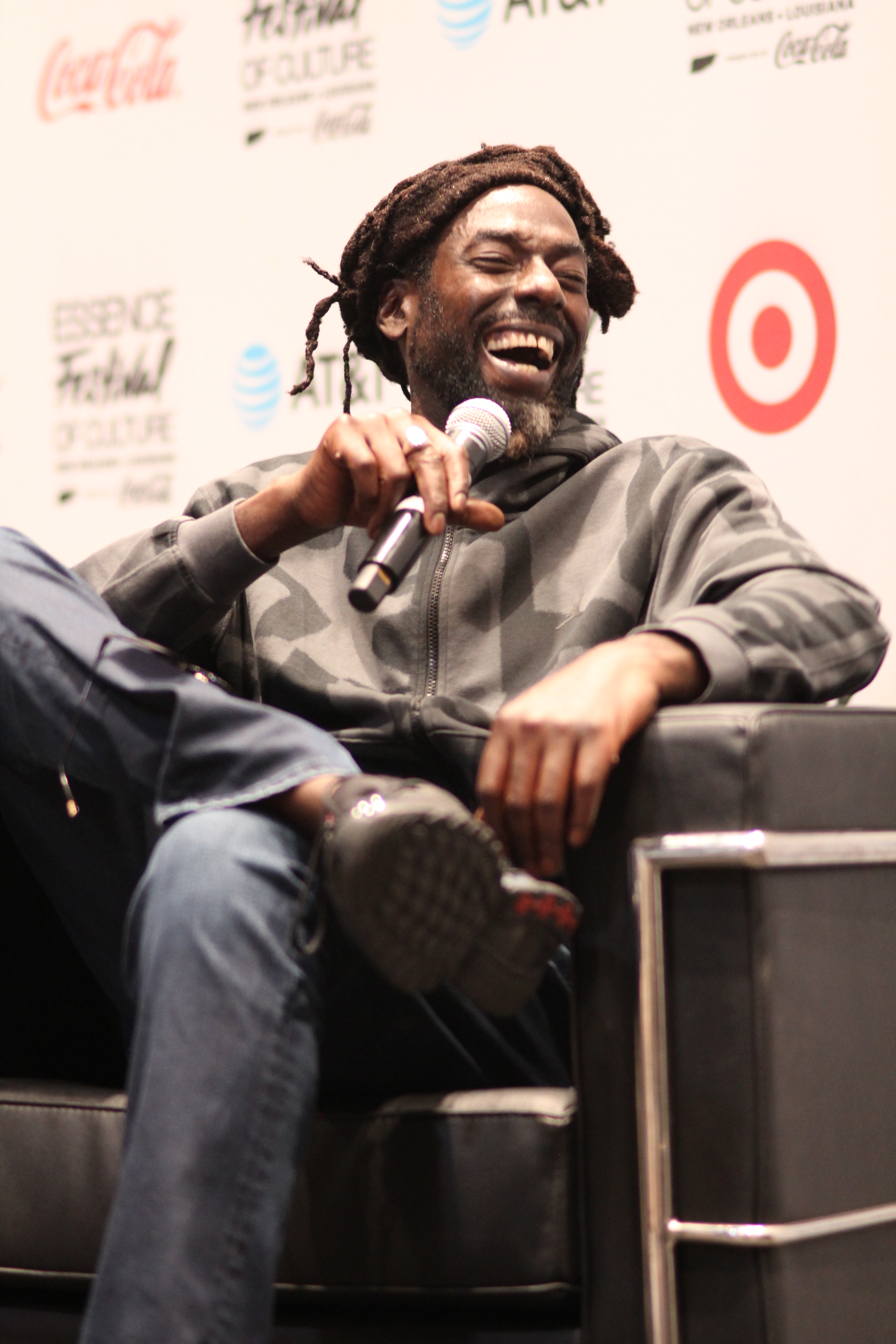
- Banton at Essence Festival of Culture in July 2025

Background information
- Also known as: Gargamel
- Born: Mark Anthony Myrie; 15 July 1973 (age 53); Kingston, Jamaica
- Genres: Dancehall; roots reggae
- Occupations: Musician; singer; songwriter
- Years active: 1987–2011; 2018–present
- Labels: Techniques; Penthouse; Mercury; PolyGram; Loose Cannon; Island; VP; Gargamel Music; Roc Nation

Mark Anthony Myrie (born 15 July 1973), known professionally as Buju Banton, is a Jamaican Reggae and dancehall musician. He is one of the most significant and well-regarded artists in Jamaican music. Banton has collaborated with many international artists, including those in the hip-hop, Latin and punk rock genres, as well as the sons of Bob Marley.

Banton released several dancehall singles as early as 1987 but came to prominence in 1992 with two albums, Stamina Daddy and Mr. Mention, the latter becoming the best-selling album in Jamaican history upon its release. That year he also broke the record for No. 1 singles in Jamaica, previously held by Bob Marley and the Wailers. He signed with the major label Mercury Records and released Voice of Jamaica in 1993. By the mid-1990s, Banton's music became more influenced by his Rastafari faith, as heard on the seminal albums 'Til Shiloh and Inna Heights.

In 2009, he was arrested for cocaine trafficking charges in the United States, his first trial resulting in a hung jury. His 2010 album Before the Dawn won a Grammy Award for Best Reggae Album at the 53rd Annual Grammy Awards. In 2011, he was convicted on the aforementioned criminal charge and was imprisoned in the U.S. until December 2018, whereupon he was released, and deported to Jamaica.

== Biography ==
=== Background ===
Buju Banton was born in Kingston, Jamaica, in an area known as Barbican Road, Kingston 8. Buju is a nickname given to him by his mother as a child. Banton is a Jamaican word that refers to someone who is a respected storyteller, and it was adopted by Myrie in tribute to the deejay Burro Banton, whom he admired as a child. Buju emulated Burro's rough vocals and forceful delivery, developing his own distinctive style. Buju's mother was a higgler, or street vendor, while his father worked as a labourer at a tile factory. He was the youngest of fifteen children born into a family that was directly descended from the Maroons of Jamaica. In August 2024, Banton said he had traced his origin to the Igbo people according to his bloodline. Igbo is an ethnic group predominantly found in Nigeria. Singer Sean Kingston claims that Banton is his uncle, but the claim remains unproven.

Banton has homes in Jamaica and Tamarac, Florida (United States). He also has 17 children.

=== Early career ===
As a youngster, Banton would often watch his favourite artists perform at outdoor shows and local dancehalls in Denham Town. At the age of 12, he picked up the microphone for himself and began toasting under the moniker of Gargamel, working with the Sweet Love and Rambo Mango sound systems. In 1986, he was introduced to producer Robert Ffrench by fellow deejay Clement Irie, and his first single, "The Ruler" was released not long afterward in 1987. This led to recording sessions with producers such as Patrick Roberts, Bunny Lee, Winston Riley, and Digital B.

=== 1990s ===
In 1991, Banton joined Donovan Germain's Penthouse Records label and began a fruitful partnership with producer Dave Kelly who later launched his own "Madhouse Records" label. Banton is one of the most popular musicians in Jamaican history, having major chart success in 1992, with "Bogle" and "Love me Browning", both massive hits in Jamaica. Controversy erupted over "Love Me Browning" which spoke of Banton's penchant for lighter-skinned black women: "Mi love my car mi love my bike mi love mi money and ting, but most of all mi love mi browning." Some accused Banton of denigrating the beauty of darker-skinned black women. In response, he released "Love Black Woman", which spoke of his love for dark-skinned beauties: "Mi nuh Stop cry, fi all black women, respect all the girls dem with dark complexion". 1992 was an explosive year for Banton as he broke Bob Marley's record for the greatest total number one singles in a year. Banton's gruff voice dominated the Jamaican airwaves for the duration of the year. His debut album, Mr. Mention, includes many of his greatest hits from that year including "Bonafide Love" featuring Wayne Wonder, the singer who first brought Banton out as a guest star on the annual Jamaican stage show Sting.

1992 also saw the unsanctioned re-release of "Boom Bye Bye", a controversial song recorded several years earlier in 1988 when the artist was 15 years old, which resulted in a backlash that threatened to destroy his career. Several years later, the song would later become the subject of outrage in the United States and Europe, leading to Banton being dropped from the line-up of the WOMAD festival as well as numerous other scheduled performances. Banton subsequently issued a public apology.

Now on the major Mercury/PolyGram label, Banton released the hard-hitting Voice of Jamaica in 1993. The album included a number of conscious tracks. These tracks included "Deportees", a song which criticises those Jamaicans who went abroad but never sent money home; "Tribal War" a collaboration with Tony Rebel, Brian & Tony Gold, and Terry Ganzie, a sharp condemnation of political violence that interpolates Little Roy's classic reggae song of the same name; and "Willy, Don't Be Silly", which promotes safe sex and the use of contraceptives, particularly the condom, profits from which were donated to a charity supporting children with AIDS. Banton was invited to meet Jamaican Prime Minister P. J. Patterson, and won several awards that year at the Caribbean Music Awards and the Canadian Music Awards.

Some of Banton's lyrics dealt with violent themes, which he explained as reflecting the images that young Jamaicans were presented with by the news media. The reality of Kingston's violence was brought home in 1993 by the murders in separate incidents of three of his friends and fellow recording artists, the deejays Pan Head and Dirtsman and singer Mickey Simpson. His response was the single "Murderer", which condemned gun violence, going against the flow of the prevailing lyrical content in dancehall. The song inspired several clubs to stop playing songs with the excessively violent subject matter. Late in 1994, Banton was also affected by the death of his friend Garnett Silk. Banton's transformation continued, as he embraced the Rastafari movement and began growing dreadlocks. His performances and musical releases took on a more spiritual tone. Banton toured Europe and Japan, playing sold-out shows.

'Til Shiloh (1995) was a very influential album, incorporating live instrumentation as well as digital rhythms, and incorporating the sounds of roots reggae along with the harder-edged dancehall sounds that first made Banton famous. The artist was embracing his Rastafari faith and his new album reflected these beliefs. Til Shiloh successfully blended conscious lyrics with a hard-hitting dancehall vibe. The album included earlier singles such as "Murderer" along with "Wanna Be Loved" and "Untold Stories". In 1996, Banton contributed "Wanna Be Loved (Desea ser Amado)" along with Los Pericos to the Red Hot Organization's album Silencio=Muerte: Red Hot + Latin for the Red Hot Benefit Series. This series raises money to increase AIDS awareness.

That same year, Banton took control of his business by establishing his own Gargamel Music label, releasing the popular single "Love Sponge" on vinyl in Jamaica and overseas. In years to come, Gargamel would expand into an outlet for Banton's own productions.

Inna Heights (1997) substantially increased Banton's international audience as he explored his singing ability and recorded a number of roots-tinged tracks, including the popular "Destiny" and "Hills and Valleys". The album also included collaborations with artists such as Beres Hammond and the legendary Toots Hibbert. The album was well received by fans at the time and critics praised Banton's soaring vocals. The album has aged well and remains a highly regarded work over 20 years after its release. In 1998, Banton met the punk band Rancid and recorded three tracks with them: "No More Misty Days", "Hooligans" and "Life Won't Wait". The latter became the title track of Rancid's 1998 album Life Won't Wait.

=== 2000s ===
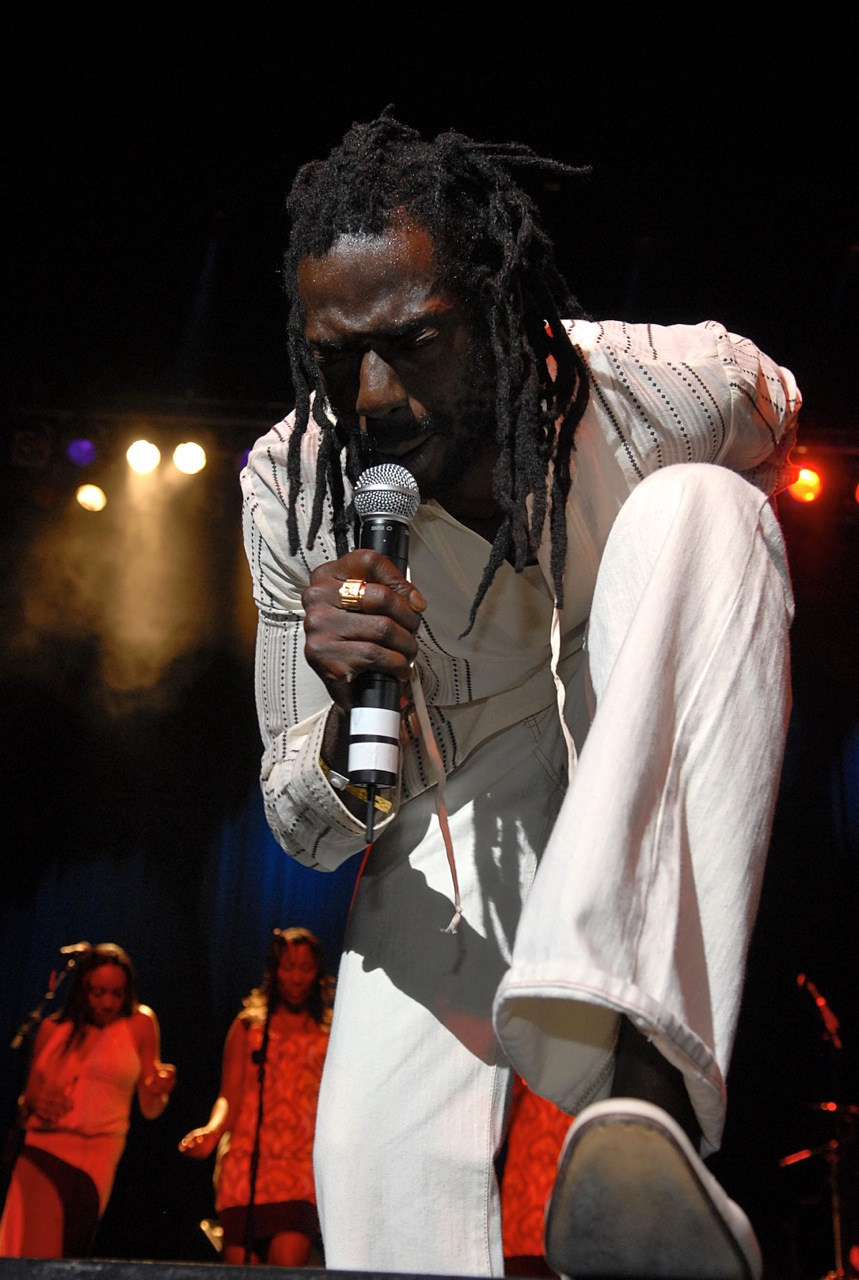
Buju Banton performing in 2007

Banton signed with Anti- Records, a subsidiary of Brett Gurewitz's Epitaph Records, and released Unchained Spirit in 2000. The album showcased diverse musical styles, and featured guest appearances by Luciano, Morgan Heritage, Stephen Marley, and Rancid. It carried little of the roots feel heard on Til Shiloh and virtually none of the hardcore dancehall sound which had brought him to public acclaim early in his career.

Several singles followed in the start of the new decade, which was perceived as more mellow and introspective, as opposed to the dancehall approach of his early career. In March 2003, Banton released Friends for Life, which featured more sharply political songs, including "Mr. Nine", an anti-gun song that was a hit in Jamaica's dancehalls as well as internationally. The album focused on political messages regarding the African diaspora, featuring excerpts from a speech made by Marcus Garvey. "Paid Not Played", also featured on the album, displayed a gradual return to the themes more popular in dancehall. The album also featured some hip-hop influence with the inclusion of rapper Fat Joe.

2006 saw the release of the Too Bad, an album that was more dancehall-oriented in style. One of the slower tracks from the album, "Driver A", went on to become a major hit, while at the same time reviving Sly and Robbie's "Taxi" riddim. Banton performed at the 2007 Cricket World Cup Opening Ceremony with Third World and Beres Hammond. The album Rasta Got Soul was released in 2009. Produced by Banton, with contributions from longtime collaborators Donovan Germain, Stephen Marsden and Wyclef Jean, Rasta Got Soul was a 100% roots reggae album recorded over a seven-year period before its release. It went on to earn Banton his fourth Grammy nomination for Best Reggae Album in 2010.

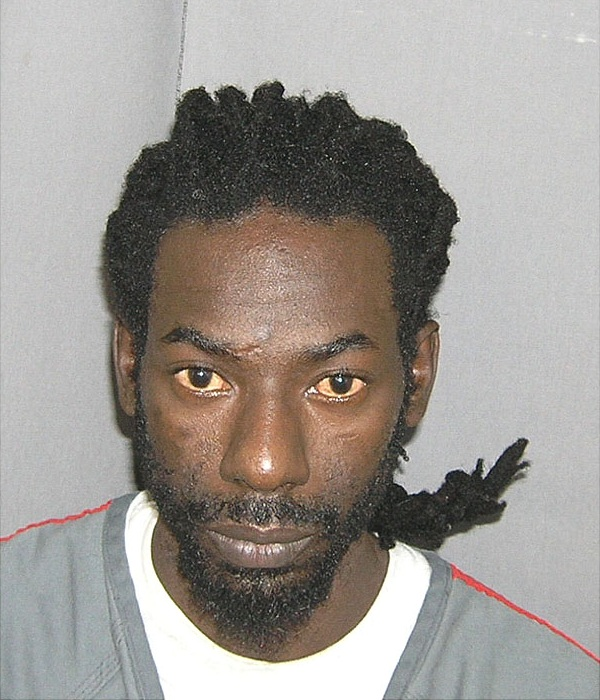
Mug shot of Banton taken shortly after his arrest

In December 2009, Drug Enforcement Administration agents remanded Banton to custody in Miami, where the U.S. Attorney charged him with conspiracy to distribute and possession of more than five kilograms of cocaine. Banton was then moved to the Pinellas County Jail where he remained until trial. A six-day trial in Tampa, Florida was declared a mistrial on 27 September 2010, after the jury was unable to reach a unanimous decision. During the trial, audio recordings were presented of Banton and a drug-dealer-turned-government-informant discussing drugs, drug prices and smuggling. Banton was also seen on a video recording meeting the informant in a police-controlled warehouse tasting cocaine from a kilogram bag. The informant was reportedly paid $50,000 for his work on the case. The singer was released that November on bond.

He was allowed to perform one concert between trials, which was held on 16 January 2011 to a sold-out crowd in Miami. A few weeks after the performance, he was nominated for the Grammy Award for Best Reggae Album but was not allowed to attend the ceremony.

=== 2010s ===
On 13 February 2011, one day before the scheduled start of his second court trial in Tampa, Florida, Banton's Before the Dawn album was announced as the winner of Best Reggae Album at the 53rd Annual Grammy Awards.

On 22 February 2011, Banton was found guilty of conspiracy to possess with intent to distribute five or more kilograms of cocaine, possession of a firearm in furtherance of a drug-trafficking offense and using communication wires to facilitate a drug-trafficking offense. He was found not guilty on the charge of attempted possession of five kilograms or more of cocaine. Four months later, he was sentenced to ten years and one month in a federal prison for the cocaine trafficking conviction. His sentencing on a related firearms conviction (despite the fact that Banton was never found with a gun) was scheduled for 30 October 2012, and then postponed on his lawyer's request for an investigation of possible juror misconduct. Despite the fact that a juror was found guilty of misconduct, Banton waived his right to an appeal. On 14 May 2015, federal prosecutors agreed to drop the firearms charge.

Banton was released on 7 December 2018 from McRae Correctional Institution.

Upon his release from prison in the United States in December 2018, Banton started The Long Walk to Freedom tour and performed his first concert at National Stadium in Kingston, Jamaica in March 2019; the concert attracted over 30,000 people. During his tour, he continued putting out new music and new singles including "Bagga Mouth", "False Pretense", and "Country for Sale".

In May 2019, Banton released "Country for Sale"; the song topped the iTunes Reggae Chart within minutes after the announcement of its release. The song was recorded at the Gargamel Music Studio, Donovan Germain's own recording studio in the Corporate Area. On 12 November of the same year, he released his first official music video entitled “Trust”. The video marked the first anniversary of Banton's release from prison and was produced in collaboration with Dave Kelly and directed by Kieran Khan. The track peaked at number one on the Billboard Reggae Digital Song Sales chart.

Banton announced his partnership with Jay-Z's Roc Nation in November of that year, becoming the second Jamaican reggae artist be represented by the agency, which coincided with the release of his music video "Steppa". He also announced that Island Records will be the distributor of the collaboration's new music.

=== 2020s ===
In January 2020, Banton was featured on the Bad Boys for Life soundtrack, which was produced by DJ Khaled. His song titled "Murda She Wrote" was a nod to the 1992 dancehall classic "Murder She Wrote" by Jamaican reggae duo Chaka Demus & Pliers.

On 29 February 2020, Banton produced the "Steppaz Riddim" under this own Gargamel Music label. The riddim, released under Roc Nation, featured 11 tracks and included contributions from Vershon, Delly Ranx, Agent Sasco, Bling Dawg and General B. Banton released his 13th studio album and his first in a decade, Upside Down 2020 on 26 June 2020. The album includes guest appearances from John Legend, Pharrell, Stefflon Don and Stephen Marley. Banton appeared on the track "Believe What I Say" by Kanye West, off his 2021 album Donda.

In 2021, Banton began a project releasing NFT's. "Banton has teamed up with CrimsonTide Ltd. to create a collection of original NFT art pieces that will come in digital and autographed canvas pieces". Banton became one of the first Jamaican artists to release an NFT. He also appeared on DJ Khaled's album Khaled Khaled. He appeared on the track "WHERE YOU COME FROM" along with Capleton and Bounty Killer.

In 2022, Banton was featured on DJ Khaled's album God Did. He appeared on the track "These Streets Know My Name" along with Skillibeng, Capleton, Bounty Killer, and Sizzla.

Recently, Buju Banton has expressed criticism towards reggaetón, a genre that blends Latin rhythms with Jamaican dancehall and hip-hop influences, particularly for what he sees as a lack of recognition for the genre's Jamaican roots and the absence of collaborations between reggaetón artists and Jamaican musicians. However, in the past, he collaborated with Puerto Rican reggaetón artist Tego Calderón on the song “Bad Man.”

== Anti-gay lyrics ==
His song "Boom Bye Bye", which was originally recorded when he was 15 years old and later re-released in 1992 at the age of 19, contains lyrics depicting the murder of gay men. After the re-release in 1992, Banton issued a public apology after receiving public backlash internationally. In 2009, gay-rights groups appealed to venues around the United States not to host Buju Banton.

In 2007, Banton was allegedly among a number of reggae artists who signed a pledge, called the Reggae Compassionate Act, created by the Stop Murder Music campaign, to refrain from performing homophobic songs or making homophobic statements. The Act stated that the signers "do not encourage nor minister to HATE but rather uphold a philosophy of LOVE, RESPECT, and UNDERSTANDING towards all human beings as the cornerstone of reggae music" and promised that the artists involved no longer believed in sexism, homophobia, or violence and that they would not perform music that went against these beliefs on stage. Banton later denied that he had made any such commitment, although he did refrain from performing "Boom Bye Bye" and other offensive songs at the 2007 Reggae Carifest concert.

On 20 March 2019, Banton and his team officially removed "Boom Bye Bye" from his catalog. Banton's team pulled the song from streaming platforms such as Apple Music and Spotify, and Banton announced his intention to never perform the song again. Banton issued a statement in which he clarified the importance of tolerance and love.

== Discography ==
- Stamina Daddy (1992) – later repackaged as Quick
- Mr. Mention (1992)
- Voice of Jamaica (1993)
- 'Til Shiloh (1995)
- Inna Heights (1997)
- Unchained Spirit (2000)
- Friends for Life (2003)
- Too Bad (2006)
- Rasta Got Soul (2009)
- Before the Dawn (2010)
- Upside Down 2020 (2020)
- Born for Greatness (2023)
- Too Too Bad (2026)

== Awards and nominations ==
Year	Nominee / work	Award	Result	Ref.
1998	Inna Heights	Grammy Award for Best Reggae Album	Nominated	
2003	Friends For Life	Grammy Award for Best Reggae Album	Nominated	
2006	Too Bad	Grammy Award for Best Reggae Album	Nominated	
2009	Rasta Got Soul	Grammy Award for Best Reggae Album	Nominated	
2010	Before The Dawn	Grammy Award for Best Reggae Album	Won	
2020	Upside Down 2020	Grammy Award for Best Reggae Album	Nominated	
