= Beres Hammond =

Beres Hammond OJ
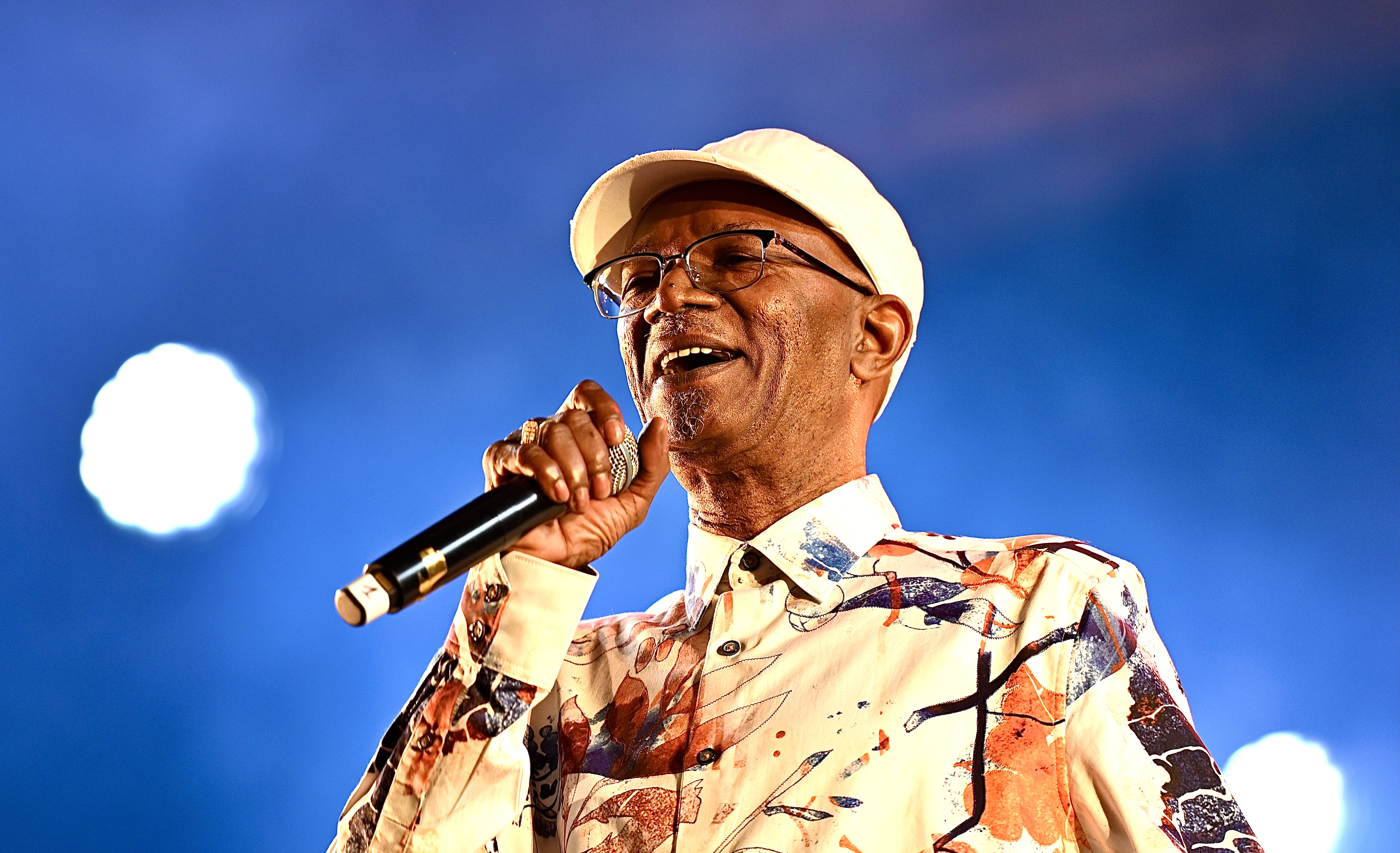
- Beres Hammond performing at Reggae Geel 2022

Background information
- Born: Hugh Beresford Hammond; 28 August 1955 (age 71); Annotto Bay, Jamaica
- Genres: Reggae
- Occupation: Singer-songwriter
- Instruments: singing, toasting
- Years active: 1972–present
- Labels: VP Records, Harmony House

Hugh Beresford Hammond OJ (born 28 August 1955, in Annotto Bay, Saint Mary, Jamaica) is a Jamaican reggae singer, known in particular for his lovers rock music. While his career began in the 1970s, he reached his greatest success in the 1990s.

== Biography ==
Born the ninth of ten children, Hammond grew up listening to his father's collection of American soul and jazz music including Sam Cooke and Otis Redding. He was further influenced by the native music of ska and rocksteady, in particular Alton Ellis.

Hammond began participating in local talent contests from 1972 to 1973, which led to his first recording, of Ellis' "Wanderer". In 1975 he joined the band, Zap Pow, as lead singer, leading to the hit 1978 single, "The System" under the Aquarius Records label. However, he simultaneously sought a solo career, releasing his debut album, Soul Reggae, in 1976. His solo ballads "One Step Ahead" (1976) and Joe Gibbs produced "I'm in Love" (1978), were both hits in Jamaica. He left Zap Pow in 1979 to pursue his solo career, and recorded two more albums Let's Make A Song in 1980 and Red Light 1981. He formed Tuesday's Children, a harmony group that toured but never recorded.

Hammond formed his own record label, Harmony House Records, in 1985 for the release of his Make a Song album, which had two Jamaican chart-toppers that were influenced by the emerging dancehall style: "Groovy Little Thing" and "What One Dance Can Do". The latter, produced by Willie Lindo, began to break Hammond into the international market. He scored another hit in 1986 with "Settling Down" on his eponymous release. He left his fame in Jamaica for New York City in 1987, after being tied up as thieves ransacked his house during a home invasion. There he recorded the Have a Nice Weekend album and the duet single "How Can We Ease the Pain" with Maxi Priest.

Hammond returned briefly to Jamaica to record Putting Up Resistance, which was significantly harder than his typical ballads, produced by Tappa Zukie, which spawned the hits "Putting Up Resistance" and "Strange". He signed with Penthouse Records in 1990 and returned to Jamaica permanently to record the dancehall smash "Tempted to Touch", with producer Donovan Germain. This is perhaps his best known song in the United States and United Kingdom, and set the foundation for the hits "Is This a Sign" and "Respect to You Baby" on the 1992 A Love Affair album. Also in 1992, Beres released the single "Fire". The song received critical acclaim within the reggae music industry and it was an extremely sought after 7" single. Now garnering interest from major studios such as Elektra Records, Hammond recorded five more albums in the 1990s as well as several compilations, establishing himself as one of the top lovers rock artists. His first album of the new millennium was 2001's Music Is Life, which featured an appearance by Wyclef Jean, and contributions from Earl "Chinna" Smith and Flourgon. The album spawned several hits, including "They Gonna Talk", "Rockaway" and "Ain't It Good To Know". The 2004 release Love Has No Boundaries, had guest spots by Buju Banton and Big Youth.

Hammond returned to Jamaica to perform at the Opening Ceremony for the Cricket World Cup 2007, and the next year, in 2008, he released the album A Moment in Time, on VP Records, which featured the single "I Feel Good". After 4 years, in 2012, Hammond released the album One Love, One Life which topped the Billboard Reggae Albums chart. In 2013, Hammond was awarded the Order of Jamaica by the Jamaican government in recognition of his "exceptional and dedicated contribution to the Jamaican music industry" right before his album One Love, One Life was nominated for a Grammy Award in January 2014. Almost six years after the album One Love, One Life was released, Hammond released the album, Never Ending in October 2018, which features contributions from musicians including Errol Holt, Mafia & Fluxy, Dean Fraser, and Robbie Lyn. After its first week of release, it topped the Billboard Reggae Albums Chart.

In 2019 Beres Hammond toured the United States and Canada. The Never Ending tour started in late July in Danbury, Connecticut. It also made stops in Baltimore, Cincinnati, Chicago, Boston, Toronto, Brooklyn, Philadelphia, Newark, Huntington (New York), Richmond (Virginia), Washington D.C., Norfolk (Virginia), Charlotte (North Carolina), Atlanta, Orlando and Fort Lauderdale.

On 28 February 2021, Harmony House and VP Records presented Love From A Distance Live, a streaming event with guest appearances by Buju Banton, Marcia Griffiths, and Popcaan during the COVID-19 pandemic quarantine. The show was streamed on Hammond's Facebook page and VP Records' YouTube page, and up to 1 March, VP Records' stream was trending at number five.

On 20 August 2023, Beres Hammond was awarded with an award in recognition of his exemplary dedication and soulful musical artistry by the Jamaican Museum and Cultural Center in Atlanta, GA.

== Discography ==
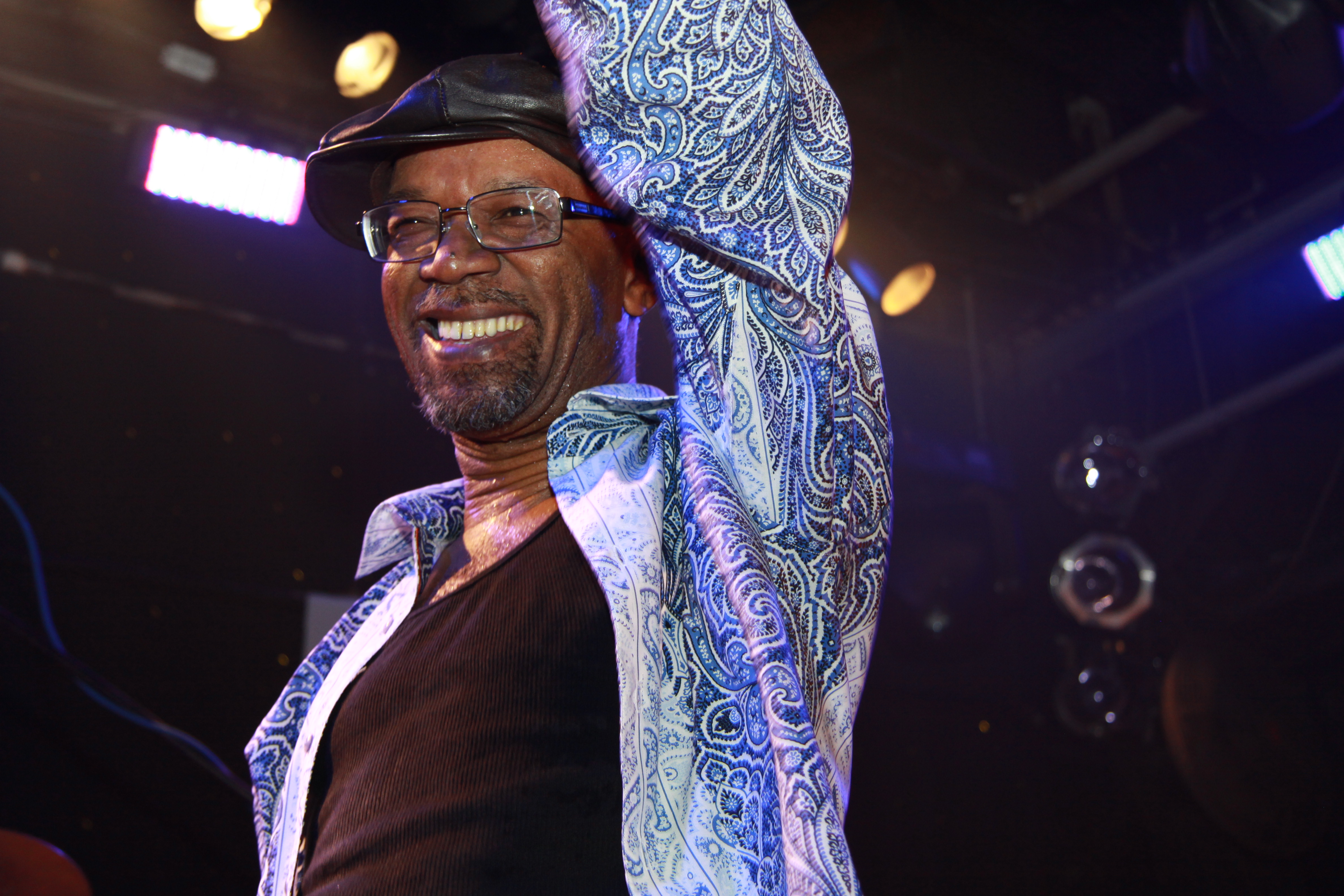
Beres Hammond at Toad's Place in CT on 14 August 2013

=== Solo albums ===
Year	Album title	Label
1976	Soul Reggae	Water Lily
1979	Just a Man	VP
1981	Let's Make a Song	Brotherhood Music Inc.
1983	Red Light	Heavybeat – recorded 1983
1985	Beres Hammond	VP
1988	Have A Nice Weekend	VP
1992	A Love Affair	Jet Star
1993	Full Attention	VP
1993	Sweetness	VP
1994	In Control	Elektra
1996	Putting Up Resistance	VP
1997	Lifetime Guarantee	Greensleeves
1997	Love from a Distance	VP
1998	A Day in the Life	VP
2001	Music Is Life	VP
2004	Love Has No Boundaries	VP
2008	A Moment in Time – with DVD	VP
2012	One Love, One Life	VP
2018	Never Ending	VP

=== Collaborative albums ===
Year	Album title	Label
1995	Expression - Beres Hammond & Derrick Lara	Heartbeat
2013	Penthouse Flashback Series: Beres and Buju - Beres Hammond and Buju Banton	Penthouse
2020	Reggae Penthouse Triplets: Beres Hammond, Sanchez and Wayne Wonder - Beres Hammond, Sanchez & Wayne Wonder	Penthouse
2023	Reggae Generals: Beres Hammond & Sanchez - Beres Hammond & Sanchez	Reggae Library

=== Compilations ===
Year	Album title	Label
1976	Soul Reggae and More	Heavybeat
1996	Jet Star Reggae Max	Jet Star
1998	Beres Hammond: Collectors Series	Penthouse
2001	Beres Hammond and Friends	Ejaness
2003	Can't Stop a Man: The Best of Beres Hammond	VP
2009	Something Old Something New	Penthouse

=== Cover versions of Beres Hammond songs ===
Year	Album title	Label
2011	Our Favorite Beres Hammond Songs - Various Artists	VP

=== DVD ===
Year	DVD title	Label
2002	Beres Hammond: Music is Life – Live From New York	VP
