= Donovan Germain =

Jamaican record producer

Donovan Germain OD (born 7 March 1952) is a reggae producer.

== Biography ==
Germain was born in Jamaica. His entry into the music industry was via his record shop in New York City in the 1970s. He began production in 1972, visiting Jamaica for recording sessions, working in both roots reggae and lovers rock. As a producer he had hits on the reggae charts with the likes of Cultural Roots' "Mr. Boss Man" in 1980, and broke through into the UK Singles Chart in the early and mid-1980s with Sugar Minott's "Good Thing Going" and Audrey Hall's "One Dance Won't Do". He ran the Revolutionary Sounds label which started in the early 1980s and ran from New York, and also ran the Rub-a-Dub, Reggae, and Germain labels. One of Germain label's most well-known records on the sound system circuit in UK, especially on Jah Shaka sound, was Sam Bramwell's It ago Dread inna Babylon, which Bramwell-- previously a vocalist with The Chantells -- recorded with The Revolutionaries.

He returned to Kingston in 1987 and opened his Penthouse Studio on Slipe Pen Road (originally located on the top floor — hence the name — now located on Ballater Avenue and including a pressing facility), which soon became highly in-demand, and became one of the island's top studios, with Germain becoming recognized as one of the very top reggae producers, taking over as Jamaica's leading producer from King Jammy. In the early days of the studio he worked with such renowned artists as Freddie McGregor, Delroy Wilson, Marcia Griffiths, and Tenor Saw, and went on to enjoy great success with Buju Banton (who with Germain had more Jamaican number one singles than any other artist), Mad Cobra, Cutty Ranks, Morgan Heritage, Wayne Wonder, and Beres Hammond. In 2012, Germain received Jamaica's Excellence in Music and Entertainment (EME) Award for Producer of the Year (reggae).

In October 2014, the Institute of Jamaica awarded Germain a silver Musgrave Medal for his contribution to music. In August 2015, it was announced that he would be awarded the Order of Distinction by the Jamaican government.
