= Health and Strength =

Studio album by Prince Far I
- Released: 1998
- Recorded: 1978–1979
- Studio: Channel One, Kingston, Jamaica
- Genre: Reggae
- Length: 36:18
- Label: Pressure Sounds
- Producer: Prince Far I

Prince Far I chronology
Umkhonto We Sizwe (Spear of the Nation) (1984)	Health and Strength (1998)

Professional ratings
Review scores
Source	Rating
Allmusic	4.5/5 stars
The Encyclopedia of Popular Music	3/5 stars

Health and Strength is an album by Prince Far I recorded in the late 1970s but not released until 1998.

== Recording ==
Health and Strength was recorded for Virgin Records's Front Line label between 1978 and 1979, but the master tapes were lost en route to Virgin's offices. In 1997, a former staff member for Hit Run records (the label run by Adrian Sherwood, with whom Prince Far I worked for several years) discovered a cassette that he had made from the master tapes, and the album was finally released by Pressure Sounds.

The album features several tracks based on Gregory Isaacs songs – "Brother Joe", "Health Warning" (which uses Isaacs' "Sacrifice" as its basis), and "House of Jah" (which is based on "Handcuff"). The album also features DJ Blackskin Prophet (on "When the King Comes to Earth") and includes the Jamaican singles "Frontline Speech" and "Weatherman Tam". The album features Prince Far I singing and chanting.

== Track listing ==
1. "Frontline Speech"
2. "Brother Joe"
3. "House Of Jah"
4. "Health Warning"
5. "Weatherman Tam"
6. "When The King Comes"
7. "Easy Squeeze"
8. "Solomon's Wisdom"
9. "The Will To Win"
10. "Clean Hands Pure Heart"
11. "Leave Babylon"

== Personnel ==
- Prince Far I – vocals, production
- Carlton "Santa" Davis – drums
- Sly Dunbar – drums
- Eric "Fish" Clarke – drums
- Lincoln "Style" Scott – drums
- Flabba Holt – bass guitar
- Bertram "Ranchie" McLean – bass guitar
- Robbie Shakespeare – bass guitar
- Clinton Jack – bass guitar
- Bingy Bunny – guitar
- "Crucial" Tony Phillips – guitar
- Earl "Chinna" Smith – guitar
- Noel "Sowell" Bailey – guitar
- Dougie Bryan – guitar
- Clifton "Bigga" Morrison – keyboards
- Wycliffe "Steele" Johnson – keyboards
- Ansel Collins – keyboards
- Ossie Hibbert – keyboards
- Sticky – percussion
- Augustus Pablo – melodica
