= Cry Tuff Dub Encounter Chapter 1 =

Cry Tuff Dub Encounter

Studio album by Prince Far I
- Released: 1978
- Genre: Dub
- Length: 38:36
- Label: Hitrun
- Producer: Prince Far I

Prince Far I chronology
| Long Life (1978) | Cry Tuff Dub Encounter (1978) | Cry Tuff Dub Encounter Part 2 (1979) |

Professional ratings
Review scores
| Source | Rating |
|---|---|
| Allmusic | 4/5 stars |
| The Encyclopedia of Popular Music | 2/5 stars |

Cry Tuff Dub Encounter Chapter 1 is a 1978 dub album by Prince Far I, which was credited on its release to his backing band The Arabs. It was produced by Prince Far I, engineered by Dennis Bovell and Mark Lusardi, and mixed by Adrian Sherwood.

The album saw its first CD release in 1991 by Danceteria as part of their "ROIR Sessions" series. It was subsequently reissued on CD and vinyl in 1997 by Pressure Sounds.

== Track listing ==
1. "A Message"
2. "The Visitor"
3. "The Right Way"
4. "Long Life"
5. "The Encounter"
6. "Ghardaia Dub"
7. "Mansion of the Almighty"
8. "Mozabites"
9. "Prince of Peace"
10. "Abderrahane"

== Personnel ==
- Prince Far I - vocals

The Arabs

- Eric "Fish" Clarke - drums
- Sly Dunbar - drums
- Clinton Jack - bass guitar
- Flabba Holt - bass guitar, guitar
- Bingy Bunny - guitar
- Antonio "Crucial Tony" Phillips - guitar
- Noel "Sowell" Bailey - guitar
- Chinna a.k.a. Earl Flute-Melchizedek the High Priest - guitar
- Theo Beckford - piano
- Clifton "Bigga" Morrison - piano
- Creation Rebel - percussion
- Sucker - percussion
- Sticky - percussion
