= Free from Sin =

Studio album by Prince Far I
- Released: 1979
- Recorded: Harry J/Treasure Isle, Kingston, Jamaica
- Genre: Reggae
- Label: Trojan
- Producer: Prince Far I

Prince Far I chronology
| Cry Tuff Dub Encounter Part 2 (1979) | Free from Sin (1979) | Dub to Africa (1979) |

Professional ratings
Review scores
| Source | Rating |
|---|---|
| AllMusic | 4/5 stars |
| The Encyclopedia of Popular Music | 4/5 stars |

Free from Sin is a 1979 reggae album by Prince Far I. It was produced by Prince Far I and engineered by Sylvan Morris & Errol Brown.

== Track listing ==
1. "Free from Sin"
2. "When Jah Ready You Got to Move"
3. "Call On I in Trouble"
4. "Don't Deal with Folly"
5. "Light of Fire"
6. "Reggae Music"
7. "Go Home on the Morning Train"
8. "Siren"
9. "I and I Are the Chosen One"

== Personnel ==
- Prince Far I - vocals
- Lincoln "Style" Scott - drums
- Flabba Holt - bass guitar
- Noel "Sowell" Bailey - lead guitar, strings
- Chinna - lead guitar
- Bingy Bunny - rhythm guitar
- Bobby Kalphat - keyboards
- Easy Snappin' - keyboards
- Bobby Ellis - horns
- "Deadly" Headley Bennett - horns
- Bongo Herman - bongos, percussion
- Ras Menilik Dacosta - bongos, percussion
