= Cry Tuff Dub Encounter Chapter 3 =

Studio album by Prince Far I & the Arabs
- Released: 1980
- Recorded: 1980
- Studio: Channel One Studios, Kingston, Jamaica
- Genre: Dub
- Label: Daddy Kool
- Producer: Prince Far I

Prince Far I & the Arabs chronology
Jamaican Heroes (1980)	Cry Tuff Dub Encounter Chapter 3 (1980)	Showcase in a Suitcase (1980)

Professional ratings
Review scores
Source	Rating
Allmusic	4/5 stars
The Encyclopedia of Popular Music	2/5 stars

Cry Tuff Dub Encounter Chapter 3 is a 1980 reggae album by Prince Far I & the Arabs. The album was originally released on vinyl in 1980 on the London-based Daddy Kool label, and was reissued on CD in 1996 by Pressure Sounds.

== Track listing ==
All tracks by Prince Far I

1. "Plant Up" – 8:09
2. "Back Weh" – 4:32
3. "The Conquest" – 4:04
4. "Final Chapter" – 3:42
5. "Shake the Nation" – 4:16
6. "Homeward Bound" – 7:45
7. "Low Gravity" – 4:23
8. "Mansion of Invention" – 2:49

== Personnel ==
- Steve Barker – liner notes
- Steve Beresford – synthesizer, human whistle, melodica
- Bingy Bunny – rhythm guitar
- Errol "Flabba" Holt – bass guitar
- Beth Lesser – photography
- Kevin Metcalfe – mastering
- Jeb Loy Nichols – prints
- Prince Far I – percussion, producer
- Lincoln "Style" Scott – percussion, drums
- Roots Radics' Noel "Sowell" Bailey – guitar
- David Toop – flute
- Ari Up – backing vocals
- Kishi Yamamoto – photography
