= Little Roy =

- Born: Earl Lowe; 1953 (age 72–73)
- Origin: Whitfield Town, Kingston, Jamaica
- Genres: Reggae, Roots Reggae, Dancehall, Dub
- Years active: Late 1960s–present
- Labels: Tafari, On-U Sound, Ark Recordings, The Morwells Esq, Copasetic, Pharos, Bullet, Camel, Syndicate, Lloyd Barnes' Bullwackie, Earth, Progress, Movements. Jah Life.

Little Roy (born Earl Lowe, 1953, in Whitfield Town, Kingston, Jamaica) is a Jamaican reggae artist.

== Biography ==
Little Roy began his career at the age of 12 years in 1965 recording a few unsuccessful tracks with producers Coxsone Dodd and Prince Buster. He was the first to record a song with the word 'reggae' in the lyric, with producer Prince Buster who named him Little Roy. He had his first number one hit with "Bongo Nyah" (1969) at the age of 16 years for Lloyd Daley ("the Matador"), the first song about the Rastafari movement to be successful commercially in Jamaica. For his song "Don't Cross the Nation" (1970), Little Roy worked with the Wailers and producer Lee "Scratch" Perry. Roy worked with the late Dennis Brown on the bass and Leroy Sibbles on the song "Tribal War". Starting in 1972, Roy worked with Maurice "Scorcher" Jackson and his brother Munchie. Roy wrote and recorded the influential and well-received songs "Tribal War" and "Prophecy" in the 1970s. George Nooks and John Holt recorded their own roots Rockers discomix takes on Roy's "Tribal War" original composition, and the rhythm from "Prophecy" was later used by Steely & Clevie in 1990, leading to a hit record for Freddie McGregor. Roy decided to re-issue some of his old material on an album titled Prophesy. A new album, Live On, was released in 1991, and he worked with Adrian Sherwood, 'Crucial' Tony Phillips, Carlton 'Bubblers' Ogilivie, Eskimo Fox, Mafia and Fluxy and B.B. Seaton on the 1996 roots rock album Long Time, which featured a new take on an earlier single, "Righteous Man", which Roy had originally recorded in 1973 for Bullwackie Lloyd Barnes. Roy released another album in 2005, Children of the Most High.

In May 2011 Little Roy collaborated with Prince Fatty and the Mutant Hi-Fi to record "Sliver/Dive" cover of Nirvana's early single. An album of Nirvana songs, Battle for Seattle, was released in September 2011 on Ark Recordings.

== Discography ==
Studio albums

- Tribal War (1975)
- Columbus Ship (1981), Tafari/Copasetic
- Prophesy (1989)
- Live On (1991)
- Long Time (1996), On-U Sound
- Gregory Isaacs meets Little Roy (1996)
- More From A Little (1999)
- Children of the Most High (2005)
- Heat (2010), Pharos
- Battle for Seattle (2011), Ark (UK chart peak: No. 111)
- Right Now (2016)

Compilations

- Prophecy (1989), Tafari
- Tafari Earth Uprising (1996), Pressure Sounds
- Packin' House (1999), Pressure Sounds (Little Roy & Friends)

Singles (partial)

- 1969 – "Bongo Nyah" / "Bad Name" (Little Roy and The Creations) (Camel, Randy's Randy Chin, Pama Records)
- 1969 – "Without My Love" / "Here I Come Again" (Little Roy and Winston Samuels) (Crab Records)
- 1970 – "Scrooge" / "In The Days of Old" (Camel)
- 1970 – "You Run Come" / "Skank King" (Camel)
- 1971 – "Yester-Me Yester-You Yesterday" / "Yes Sir" (Escort)
- 1977 – "Prophecy" (The Morwells Esq label )
- 1989 – "Prophecy" (Original Press)
- 2014 – "Disaster and Signs" (Tuff Scout)
- 2015 – "The Right Way" (Tuff Scout)

== See also ==
- List of reggae musicians
- List of roots reggae artists
