= List of Rastafarians =

This is a list of notable Rastafari.

== Early teachers ==
- Leonard Howell
- Joseph Hibbert
- Archibald Dunkley
- Sam Brown
- Vernon Carrington
- Charles Edwards
- Mortimer Planner

== Musicians ==
- Bob Marley (1945–1981), musician and singer
- Billy Ocean (1950-), musician and singer
- Peter Tosh (1944–1987) musician and singer
- Bunny Wailer (1947–2021), reggae singer
- Max Romeo (1947–2025), reggae singer
- Junior Delgado (1958–2005), reggae singer
- Beres Hammond (1955-), reggae singer
- Dennis Brown (1957–1999), reggae singer
- Winston Rodney (Burning Spear) (1945–), musician and singer
- Alpha Blondy, Ivorian reggae musician
- Alborosie, (1977-), Italian-Jamaican musician and singer
- Ziggy Marley (1968–), musician and singer
- Lucky Dube, South African reggae musician (1964–2007)
- Evison Matafale, Malawian reggae musician (1969–2001)
- Prince Far I (1945–1983), deejay
- Buju Banton (1973–), dancehall and ragga musician and singer
- Damian Marley (1978–), musician and singer
- Ky-Mani Marley(1976–), musician and singer
- Stephen Marley (1972–), musician and singer
- Julian Marley (1975–), musician and singer
- Rita Marley (1946–), musician and singer
- Rohan Marley (1972–), played college football
- Milton Nascimento (1942–), Brazilian singer
- Jah Shaka, sound system operator
- Joseph Hill (1949–2006) musician and singer
- Lincoln Thompson, (1949–1999), musician and composer
- Cedric Myton, composer and musician
- Ras Michael, musician and singer
- Sizzla, musician and singer
- Bad Brains, American hardcore punk band
- Pablo Moses, reggae singer
- Wadada Leo Smith, jazz musician and composer
- Jah Cure, Reggae singer
- Anthony B, reggae singer and deejay
- Richie Spice, reggae singer
- Mutabaruka, poet and reggae musician
- Augustus Pablo, (1954–1999) reggae musician and producer
- Hans Söllner, German musician
- Che Fu, Hip Hop, R&B and reggae Singer
- Tigilau Ness, reggae singer
- I Wayne, reggae artist/songwriter
- Capleton, reggae artist
- Soldiers of Jah Army, reggae band
- Bushman, musician and singer
- Junior Kelly, singer
- Gregory Isaacs (1951–2010), reggae singer
- Junior Reid, reggae singer
- Barrington Levy, reggae singer
- Yellowman, reggae dancehall singer
- Gentleman, reggae singer
- Don Carlos, reggae singer
- Michael Prophet (1957–2017), roots reggae singer
- Larry Marshall (1941–2017), roots reggae singer
- Jacob Miller (1952–1980), musician and reggae singer
- Nicodemus, reggae singer
- Ini Kamoze (Cecil Campbell), reggae singer
- Michael Rose, reggae singer
- Junior Murvin, reggae singer
- Sugar Minott (1956–2010), reggae singer
- Capleton, reggae singer
- Queen Ifrica, reggae singer
- U Roy, Jamaican musician
- Tribal Seeds, reggae band
- Cocoa Tea, reggae singer
- Chezidek, reggae singer
- Dezarie, reggae singer
- Junior Byles, reggae singer
- Protoje, reggae singer
- Turbulence, reggae singer
- Lutan Fyah, reggae singer
- Chronixx, reggae singer

== Politicians ==
- Ed "NJWeedman" Forchion, American cannabis rights activist
- Nándor Tánczos, New Zealand politician
- Sams'K Le Jah, Burkina Faso protest leader

== Artists ==
- Ras Daniel Heartman, Jamaican artist
- Benjamin Zephaniah, poet

== Sportspeople ==
- Chris Eubank, English boxer
- Ricardo Gardner, Jamaican footballer
- Thabo Mngomeni, South African footballer
- Tafari Moore, English footballer
