= Message from the King (album) =

Studio album by Prince Far I and the Arabs
- Released: 1978
- Genre: Reggae
- Label: Virgin Front Line
- Producer: Prince Far I

Prince Far I and the Arabs chronology
Under Heavy Manners (1978)	Message from the King (1978)	Long Life (1978)

Professional ratings
Review scores
Source	Rating
AllMusic	4.5/5 stars
The Encyclopedia of Popular Music	2/5 stars

Message from the King is a reggae album by Prince Far I and the Arabs, released in 1978.

== Track listing ==
All tracks composed by Michael Williams and the Arabs:

Side one

1. "Message from the King"
2. "The Dream"
3. "Commandment of Drugs"
4. "Moses, Moses"
5. "Black Man Land"

Side two

1. "Concrete Column"
2. "Dry Bone"
3. "Foggy Road"
4. "Wisdom"
5. "Armageddon"

== Personnel ==
- Eric Clarke, Sly Dunbar, Leroy "Horsemouth" Wallace, Carlton "Santa" Davis – drums
- Theophilus Beckford, Dennis Brown, Winston "Bo Pee" Bowen – piano
- Errol "Tarzan" Nelson – organ
- Earl "Chinna" Smith, Royal Soul – lead guitar
- Eric "Bingy Bunny" Lamont, Errol "Flabba" Holt – rhythm guitar
- Errol "Flabba" Holt – bass guitar
- Eric "Fish" Clarke, Culture, Errol "Flabba" Holt, Michael Williams – vocals
- Uziah "Sticky" Thompson, Eric Clarke – percussion

Technical

- Dennis Morris – photography
