= Cry Tuff Dub Encounter Part 2 =

Studio album by Prince Far I
- Released: 1979
- Recorded: Harry J, Kingston, Jamaica, 1979
- Genre: Reggae
- Label: Front Line
- Producer: Prince Far I

Prince Far I chronology
Cry Tuff Dub Encounter (1978)	Cry Tuff Dub Encounter Part 2 (1979)	Free from Sin (1979)

Professional ratings
Review scores
Source	Rating
Allmusic	3/5 stars
The Encyclopedia of Popular Music	2/5 stars

Cry Tuff Dub Encounter Part 2 is a 1979 reggae album by Prince Far I. It was recorded at Harry J's studio in Kingston, Jamaica and mixed by Prince Jammy. The album was reissued on compact disc in expanded form as Dubwise, with additional tracks taken from singles from the same era.

== Track listing ==
1. "Suru-Lere Dub"
2. "Anambra Dub"
3. "Kaduna Dub"
4. "Oyo Dub"
5. "Borno Dub"
6. "Ogun Dub"
7. "Bendel Dub"
8. "Ondo Dub"
9. "Gongola Dub"

== Personnel ==
- Sly Dunbar, Carlton "Santa" Davis - drums
- Robbie Shakespeare, George "Fully" Fullwood - bass guitar
- Earl "Chinna" Smith - lead guitar
- Eric "Bingy Bunny" Lamont - rhythm guitar
- Bobby Kalphat,Melodica, Errol "Tarzan" Nelson, Easy Snappin' - keyboards
- Richard "Dirty Harry" Hall, Don D. Junior - horns
- Bongo Herman, Prince Far I - percussion

Mixed by Prince Jammy
