= Jamaican Heroes =

Studio album by Prince Far I
- Released: 1980
- Genre: Reggae
- Label: Trojan
- Producer: Prince Far I

Prince Far I chronology
Dub to Africa (1979)	Jamaican Heroes (1980)	Cry Tuff Dub Encounter Chapter 3 (1980)

Professional ratings
Review scores
Source	Rating
Allmusic	4.5/5 stars
The Encyclopedia of Popular Music	4/5 stars

Jamaican Heroes is a 1980 reggae album by Prince Far I. The musicians included Roots Radics and The Flying Lizards. The album was mixed by Anthony "Crucial Bunny" Graham at Studio One, Jamaica. The cover was designed by Jill Mumfield.

Prince Far I uses the "Satta" riddim for "Deck of Life", which is a version of the song "Deck of Cards" that he recorded for Joe Gibbs. He uses Winston Riley’s "Stalag" riddim for "The Vision". "Golden Throne" is underpinned by Burning Spear’s ominous "He Prayed" riddim. The song "Musical History" is filled with criticism of the lyrics of the then deejays, such as Yellowman and General Echo. Their lyrics were just ‘gimmicks’, in contrast to his lyrics that tackled sensitive themes on the social, political and human spheres.

== Track listing ==
All tracks composed by Michael Williams; except where indicated

1. "Deck of Life" (Michael Williams, T. Tyler)
2. "The Vision"
3. "Natty Champion"
4. "Read Chapter"
5. "Golden Throne"
6. "Jamaican Heroes"
7. "Prison Discipline"
8. "Musical History"
9. "Jah Will Provide"

== Personnel ==
- Lincoln "Style" Scott, Sly Dunbar - drums
- Errol "Flabba" Holt, Robbie Shakespeare - bass guitar
- Bingy Bunny - rhythm guitar
- Noel "Sowell" Bailey - lead guitar
- Gladstone Anderson - piano
- Winston Wright - organ
- Prince Far I - percussion
- Basheba, Vivien Goldman, Ari Up, Errol "Flabba" Holt - backing vocals
- Kalimba, David Toop - flute
- Steve Beresford - toy piano, toy synthesizer, whistles, melodica, various noises

Technical

- Anthony "Crucial Bunny" Graham - engineer
- Dave Hunt, Prince Far I - mixing
- Jill Mumford - cover

"Special Thanks To : Roots Radics and Flying Lizards"
