= Long life =

Long life may refer to:

- Longevity, life expectancy, or referring to long-lived members of a population
- Long Life, a 1978 reggae album by Prince Far I
- Longlife, a transnational project in the Baltic Region
- Product life/Durable goods

== See also ==
- Lifelong learning
- Ultra-high-temperature processing
