= Eric "Fish" Clarke =

Jamaican drummer

- Born: c.1960
- Origin: Kingston, Jamaica
- Genres: Reggae
- Instruments: Drums, vocals
- Years active: Mid-1970s–present

Eric "Fish" Clarke is a Jamaican drummer who has been a member of the Roots Radics and Prince Far I's backing band, The Arabs.

== Biography ==
Born c.1960 in Kingston, Jamaica, Clarke studied at the renowned Alpha Boys School, and began his career as a drummer in the 1970s, playing in Prince Far I's backing band The Arabs and recording with artists such as B. B. Seaton, Bunny Wailer, Keith Hudson, and The Morwells. Clarke toured the UK with Prince Far I and joined Adrian Sherwood's Creation Rebel band, playing on the 1977 album Dub from Creation. He went on to join the Roots Radics, and also recorded solo material such as "Nice in Jamaica" and "Need Someone To Help Me" (the latter produced by Hudson). In the 1980s he also recorded with Sugar Minott, and in the 1990s recorded with Ras Sam Brown.

He is the younger brother of singer Johnny Clarke.
