= Nuff Crisis! =

Studio album by Culture
- Released: 1988, 1989
- Genres: Reggae, roots reggae
- Labels: Blue Mountain (Jamaica); Shanachie
- Producer: Lloyd Evans

Culture chronology
| Culture at Work (1986) | Nuff Crisis! (1988) | Three Sides to My Story (1991) |

Nuff Crisis! is a studio album by the Jamaican reggae group Culture, released in 1988. The group supported the album with a North American tour.

== Production ==
The album was produced by Lloyd Evans, with song arrangements by the Jamaican musicians Sly & Robbie. Culture was backed by the Roots Radics band; the group made it a point to avoid the then-trendy computerized sound of 1980s reggae production.

== Critical reception ==
Professional ratings
Review scores
| Source | Rating |
|---|---|
| AllMusic | 3/5 stars |
| Austin American-Statesman | 3/4 stars |
| Chicago Tribune | 3.5/4 stars |
| Robert Christgau | B+ |
| The Encyclopedia of Popular Music | 2/5 stars |
| Reno Gazette-Journal | 5/5 stars |
| The Rolling Stone Album Guide | 3.5/5 stars |

The Chicago Tribune called the album "a monster dance record," writing that "Joseph Hill's deep, soul-searching voice is as expressive as that of Bob Marley or Burning Spear's Winston Rodney, while the harmonies of Albert Walker and Kenneth Dayes shadow every syllable." The Washington Post wrote: "Never has the rhythm been so muscular; never have the vocal and horn harmonies sounded so full and satisfying. Hill's songs about backbiting in the black community, jumping into the 'Frying Pan' of adulthood and his own straying into temptation are as distinctively personal as they are catchily soulful." The Reno Gazette-Journal noted that "Hill's voice is a thing of beauty as it hovers at the edge of wildness and then swoops in to harmonize."

AllMusic thought that "with the digital sounds of ragga in vogue and many of Culture's contemporaries taking a more commercial route, it was refreshing to find a group sticking to what they do best."

== Track listing ==
| No. | Title | Length |
|---|---|---|
| 1. | "Peace, Love & Harmony" |
| 2. | "Revolution Time" |
| 3. | "Crack in New York" |
| 4. | "Don't Cry, Sufferer" |
| 5. | "Jah Rastafari" |
| 6. | "How Did I Stray" |
| 7. | "Frying Pan" |
| 8. | "Bang Belly Baby" |
| 9. | "Want Go See" |
| 10. | "Never Gonna Get Away" |

== Personnel ==
- Kenneth Dayes – vocals
- Joseph Hill – vocals
- Albert Walker – vocals
