= Africa Stand Alone =

Studio album (bootleg) by Culture
- Released: 1978
- Recorded: 1978
- Studios: Harry J's, Kingston
- Genre: Reggae
- Label: April
- Producers: Jamie Hatcher, Seymour Cummings

Culture chronology
Baldhead Bridge (1978)	Africa Stand Alone (1978)	More Culture (1978)

Professional ratings
Review scores
Source	Rating
The Encyclopedia of Popular Music	4/5 stars

Africa Stand Alone is a 1978 album by Jamaican roots reggae band Culture. It was recorded with engineer Sylvan Morris at Harry J's Studios, Kingston, in the interim between the band's sessions with producers Joe Gibbs and Sonia Pottinger, and produced by Jamie Hatcher and Seymour Cummings.

The album was never fully completed, and the extant version was released without the band's permission or involvement by U.S. label April Records in 1978, making it effectively a bootleg. As such, most of its tracks were re-recorded with Sonia Pottinger for release on the Harder Than the Rest album shortly afterwards. It remains the only Culture release to feature the track "Dog Ago Nyam Dog" in its original form, though a dub version appeared as "Dog Eat Dub" on the Culture in Dub album later the same year.

Neither the backing group (christened the Sons of Jah by Culture's lead singer Joseph Hill) nor the producers of Africa Stand Alone had appeared on record before. Perhaps for this reason, the versions here of the tracks that also appear on Harder Than the Rest are renowned for being rawer and less disciplined. The musical backing tracks are also known for being more minimal, thus allowing the vocals to take a more central rôle. The import of copies of Africa Stand Alone from the U.S. at roughly the same time as Harder Than the Rest was released had the ultimate effect of stimulating interest in the latter, and for a while each record boosted the other's sales.

Africa Stand Alone was voted the 5th best album of 1978 in NME's annual Top 50 albums poll.

== Track listing ==
1. "Love Shines Brighter"
2. "This Train"
3. "Dog Ago Nyam Dog"
4. "Tell Me Where You Get It"
5. "More Vacancy"
6. "Iron Sharpen Iron"
7. "Garvey Rock"
8. "Innocent Blood"
9. "Behold the Land"

== Personnel ==
- Joseph Hill – lead vocals
- Albert Walker – vocals
- Kenneth Dayes – vocals
- Clynton Rowe – bass
- Glen Washington – drums
- Marrick Dyer – guitars
- Phillip Williams – keyboards
- Bernard Shaw – percussion
- George Subratie – percussion
- Sylvan Morris – engineer, mixing
