= Sam Conniff =

British author

- Occupation: Author
- Known for: Livity, Live, Dubplate Drama, somewhereto
- Notable work: Be More Pirate
- Website: SamConniff.com

Sam Conniff is a British author and the founder of Livity. He released the book Be More Pirate in 2018 with Penguin Random House. As the founder of Livity, Conniff has received recognition in the UK for his entrepreneurial work, including Ernst & Young Entrepreneur of the Year and a Big Society Award.

== Early life ==
Conniff was raised in Croydon, South London. He attended Stanley technical high school up to the age of 16. Conniff then began to study for his A-levels at John Ruskin College, before leaving at 17 to join an outdoor clothing company.

In 1995, he moved away from retail to become a chef in nearby Dulwich. While working as a chef, he moved to Interlude De Chavot restaurant, ran by Marco Pierre White. Conniff's final career move was into ethical cosmetics buying and merchandising, where he spent two years working for Aveda.

== Agency career ==
In the mid-1990s, Conniff launched his first business Supernature. In 1998, he founded a promotions business named Don't Panic. After a couple of years, Conniff made the decision to focus on his new marketing agency, Livity. He officially founded Livity in 2001, the agency was founded after Conniff wanted to bring about what he called "social change," with a focus on young people. Over the next decade, Conniff began to work with numerous companies including Channel 4, Google, and Barclays.

Livity and Conniff launched Live magazine, which circulated originally in South and East London. By 2010, the circulation had grown to 35,000 and Conniff announced plans to expand the publication to Glasgow and South Africa. The move into South Africa led to the creation of Livity Africa. Over the years, the magazine has had many notable alumni, who have gone onto work in major roles in media. These have included Jordan Jarrett-Bryan and Julie Adenuga. The agency collaborated with Google to provide training to young Africans, with plans for nearly a million Millennials across the content to receive free training.

Conniff's work with Livity has led to him receiving a number of awards. He won the EY social enterprise entrepreneur of the year award in 2011. Around the same time, the UK government named Conniff as an ambassador for social enterprise and was awarded Livity with its Big Society Award. He was also recognised in 2013 as part of the Queen's Awards for Enterprise and in 2015 at the National Business Awards. He has also recently written for The Guardian.

== Be More Pirate ==
In 2018, Conniff released his first book, Be More Pirate. The book was published with Penguin Random House. Prior to its release, Conniff learned there was only a small budget to promote his book. He, therefore, flyposted Penguin Random House without their permission to gain publicity for the book.

The book follows the premise that rulebreakers, such as pirates of the 1700s, often rewrite the rules that govern society. The book is aimed at millennials, who Conniff believes society has shifted and we are seeing more people not taking traditional rules socially or in their work lives. He stated in an interview with Evening Standard, "Everyone is taking matters into their own hands. I haven’t met a twentysomething who hasn’t got a hustle or a side-hustle going on. It has become an aspiration in itself."

After the book was launched in the United States, Conniff again used creative advertising methods to publicize the book, projecting a message to then Prime Minister Theresa May and President Donald Trump onto the side of the Houses of Parliament.

Be More Pirate served as inspiration for the Netflix series The Lost Kingdom, with Conniff as one of the lead narrators.

== Uncertainty Experts ==
In 2021, Conniff developed the Uncertainty Experts project, which includes seminars and a three-part interactive documentary. The documentary features interviews with people who have experience dealing with uncertainty, referred to as Uncertainty Experts. Netflix described it as a "brain-expanding experience."

It is known as the first interactive live documentary that reduces anxiety and increases creativity. Financial investment and support were provided by Netflix, and researchers from the University College London (UCL) Decision Center also contributed to the project's development.

== Other achievements ==
While running his agency Livity, Conniff worked as Executive Producer for the TV series, Dubplate Drama.

In 2020, he was honored with a Member of the British Empire (MBE) award for his contributions to young people but declined it in an open letter, citing concerns about "the systemic issues of colonial history." Instead, he nominated several young social activists in his place, along with resources for "leveraging privilege and tackling social injustice".
