= Baldhead Bridge =

Studio album by Culture
- Released: 1978
- Studios: Joe Gibbs, Kingston
- Genre: Reggae
- Label: Joe Gibbs
- Producer: Joe Gibbs

Culture chronology
Two Sevens Clash (1977)	Baldhead Bridge (1978)	Africa Stand Alone (1978)

Baldhead Bridge is the second album by the Jamaican roots reggae band Culture, released on Joe Gibbs Records in 1978.

== Production ==
As with the band's debut, Two Sevens Clash, the album was recorded in Kingston at the studio of Joe Gibbs, who also produced the album.

The band accompanying the trio was the Professionals, which included musicians such as Sly and Robbie, Tommy McCook, and Bobby Ellis.

== Critical reception ==
Professional ratings
Review scores
Source	Rating
AllMusic	4.5/5 stars
The Encyclopedia of Popular Music	3/5 stars
The New Rolling Stone Record Guide	3/5 stars

AllMusic called the album "a true reggae classic," writing that "listeners are reminded of the impact that the Delfonics, the Impressions and other soul favorites had on reggae." Record Collector praised the "outrageously brutal" dub version of the album.

== Track listing ==
1. "Them a Payaka"
2. "How Can I Leave Jah"
3. "Baldhead Bridge"
4. "Behold I Come"
5. "Love Shines Brighter"
6. "Jah Love"
7. "Zion Gate"
8. "So Long Babylon a Fool I (And I)"

== Personnel ==
- Joseph Hill – lead vocals
- Albert Walker – vocals
- Kenneth Dayes – vocals
- Lloyd Parks – bass
- Sly Dunbar – drums
- Lennox Gordon – guitar
- Robbie Shakespeare – guitar
- Eric "Bingy Bunny" Lamont – guitar
- Franklyn Waul – keyboards
- Errol Nelson – keyboards
- Harold Butler – keyboards
- Uziah "Sticky" Thompson – percussion
- Herman Marquis – alto saxophone
- Vin Gordon – trombone
- Tommy McCook – tenor saxophone
- Bobby Ellis – trumpet
