= Long Life =

Studio album by Prince Far I
- Released: 1978
- Studios: Harry J, Kingston, Jamaica
- Genre: Reggae
- Label: Front Line
- Producer: Martin "Mandingo" Williams

Prince Far I chronology
| Message from the King (1978) | Long Life (1978) | Cry Tuff Dub Encounter (1978) |

Long Life is a reggae album by Prince Far I, released in 1978 through Front Line. "Black Starliner Must Come" is about Marcus Garvey's Black Star Line.

== Critical reception ==
Professional ratings
Review scores
| Source | Rating |
|---|---|
| AllMusic | 4/5 stars |
| The Encyclopedia of Popular Music | 2/5 stars |

AllMusic wrote that "the rhythms are provided courtesy of a studio band made up of members of both Soul Syndicate (notably the killer bass-and-drums duo of Robbie Shakespeare and Sly Dunbar) and Roots Radics, and they are, without exception, as solid and heavy as a bag of boulders."

== Track listing ==
All tracks composed and arranged by Michael Williams

1. "Daughters of Zion"
2. "Right Way"
3. "Black Starliner Must Come"
4. "Praise Him with Psalms"
5. "In Your Walking Remember Jah Jah"
6. "Farmyard"
7. "Love One Another"
8. "Who Have Eyes to See"
9. "So Long"

== Personnel ==
- Prince Far I – vocals
- Carlton "Santa" Davis, Sly Dunbar – drums
- Robbie Shakespeare, George "Fully" Fullwood – bass guitar
- Chinnaas Melchezinick – lead guitar
- Eric "Bingy Bunny" Lamont – rhythm guitar
- Bobby Kalphat, Errol "Tarzan" Nelson, Easy Snappin' – keyboards
- Richard "Dirty Harry" Hall, Vincent "Don D. Junior" Gordon – horns
- Bongo Herman, Prince Far I – percussion

Technical

- Sylvan Morris – engineer
- Dennis Morris – photography
