= Message from the King =

Message from the King may stand for:

- Message from the King (album), a 1978 reggae album from Prince Far I and the Arabs
- Message from the King (film), a 2016 thriller directed by Fabrice du Welz
