= UMkhonto we Sizwe (disambiguation) =

uMkhonto we Sizwe was the military wing of the African National Congress.

uMkhonto we Sizwe may also refer to:

- Umkhonto we Sizwe (Spear of the Nation), a 1984 album by Prince Far I
- uMkhonto we Sizwe (political party), a political party formed in 2023 and led by Jacob Zuma
- uMkhonto we Sizwe Military Veterans' Association, a former ANC auxiliary organisation
