= Showcase in a Suitcase =

Studio album by Prince Far I meets Veros Artis
- Released: 1980
- Recorded: Channel One Studios, Kingston, Jamaica, 1980
- Genre: Reggae
- Label: Pre
- Producer: Prince Far I

Professional ratings
Review scores
Source	Rating
The Encyclopedia of Popular Music	3/5 stars

Showcase In A Suitcase is a reggae album comprising showcase (songs followed by dubs) format material produced by Prince Far I, and performed by Prince Far I, Ashanti Roy, The Wailing Souls, and Naggo Morris. The backing band throughout is the Roots Radics. The tracks on the album were taken from singles released on Prince Far I's Cry Tuff label, and remixed for inclusion on the album. The album reached number six in the UK Reggae Chart published by Sounds in December 1980.

== Track listing ==
1. "Throw Away Your Gun" - Prince Far I & Ashanti Roy
2. "Buds Bush" - The Roots Radics
3. "How Love Devine" - Prince Far I & The Wailing Souls
4. "Lovers Frock" - The Roots Radics
5. "If You Want To Know Your Friend" - Prince Far I & Ashanti Roy
6. "Farm Drunk" - The Roots Radics
7. "Can't Take Su Su Pon Dread" - Naggo Morris
8. "Prince Far I Dub" - The Roots Radics
9. "Mighty Ruler" - Prince Far I & Naggo Morris
10. "Jah Do That" - The Roots Radics

== Personnel ==
- Lincoln "Style" Scott - drums
- Errol "Flabba" Holt - bass guitar
- Eric "Bingy Bunny" Lamont - rhythm guitar
- Noel "Sowell" Bailey - lead guitar
- Gladstone Anderson - keyboards
- Roy Johnston Kongo, Prince Far I, Scollie - percussion

Engineered by Anthony "Crucial Bunny" Graham and Noel "Scollie" Simms
