= Two Sevens Clash =

Studio album by Culture
- Released: 1977
- Recorded: 1976
- Studios: Joe Gibbs, Kingston,
- Genre: Reggae
- Length: 33:14
- Label: Joe Gibbs
- Producer: Joe Gibbs

Culture chronology
Two Sevens Clash (1977)	Baldhead Bridge (1978)

Two Sevens Clash is the debut album by roots reggae band Culture, recorded with producer Joe Gibbs at his own Joe Gibbs Recording Studio in Kingston in 1976, and released on Gibbs' eponymous label in 1977 (see 1977 in music). The album's title is a reference to the date of 7 July 1977.

The liner notes of the album read: "One day Joseph Hill had a vision, while riding a bus, of 1977 as a year of judgment - when two sevens clash - when past in justices would be avenged. Lyrics and melodies came into his head as he rode and thus was born the song "Two Sevens Clash" which became a massive hit in reggae circles both in Jamaica and abroad. The prophecies noted by the lyrics so profoundly captured the imagination of the people that on July 7, 1977 - the day when sevens fully clashed (seventh day, seventh month, seventy-seventh year) a hush descended on Kingston; many people did not go outdoors, shops closed, an air of foreboding and expectation filled the city."

The album was reissued by US label Shanachie Records in 1988 with different cover art, and with the track listing altered with the last five tracks of the ten tracks listed first, and tracks 1–5 becoming tracks 6–10.

To mark its 40th anniversary, the album was reissued again in 2017. This version features an additional disc of remixes and dub versions. New sleeve notes were written by Don Letts.

== Critical reception ==
Professional ratings
Review scores
Source	Rating
AllMusic	5/5 stars
Christgau's Record Guide	A+
The Encyclopedia of Popular Music	4/5 stars
Pitchfork	9.0/10
Rolling Stone	5/5 stars

Robert Christgau named the album one of the few import-only records from the 1970s he loved, but yet was omitted from Christgau's Record Guide: Rock Albums of the Seventies (1981).

In 2025 Mojo Magazine placed the album 16th in their 50 best reggae albums list.

== Track listing ==
=== 1977 original release ===
Side one
No.	Title	Length
1.	"Calling Rasta Far I"	2:30
2.	"I'm Alone in the Wilderness"	3:25
3.	"Pirate Days"	2:52
4.	"Two Sevens Clash"	3:30
5.	"I'm Not Ashamed"	3:59

Side two
No.	Title	Length
6.	"Get Ready to Ride the Lion to Zion"	3:27
7.	"Black Star Liner Must Come"	2:42
8.	"Jah Pretty Face"	3:39
9.	"See Them a Come"	3:24
10.	"Natty Dread Taking Over"	3:46

=== 2007 30th Anniversary Edition ===
No.	Title	Length
1.	"I'm Alone in the Wilderness"	3:23
2.	"Pirate Days"	2:49
3.	"Two Sevens Clash"	3:28
4.	"Calling Rasta Far I"	2:27
5.	"I'm Not Ashamed"	3:59
6.	"Get Ready to Ride the Lion to Zion"	3:24
7.	"Black Starliner Must Come"	2:39
8.	"Jah Pretty Face"	3:37
9.	"See Them a Come"	3:20
10.	"Natty Dread Taking Over"	3:45
11.	"See Dem a Come (12" Mix w/ Prince Weedy)"	6:56
12.	"See Dem Dub"	3:58
13.	"Natty Dread Taking Over (12" Mix w/ I-Roy)"	7:20
14.	"I'm Not Ashamed (12" Mix w/ I-Roy)"	7:55
15.	"Not Ashamed Dub"	4:25

== Personnel ==
- Joseph Hill – lead vocals
- Albert Walker – harmony vocals
- Kenneth Dayes – harmony vocals
- Lloyd Parks – bass
- Sly Dunbar – drums
- Lennox Gordon – guitar
- Robbie Shakespeare – guitar
- Eric "Bingy Bunny" Lamont – guitar
- Franklyn "Bubbler" Waul – keyboards
- Errol "Tarzan" Nelson – keyboards
- Harold Butler – keyboards
- Uziah "Sticky" Thompson – percussion
- Herman Marquis – alto saxophone
- Vin Gordon – trombone
- Tommy McCook – tenor saxophone
- Bobby Ellis – trumpet
- Errol "ET" Thompson, Joe Gibbs – arranging, mixing
