= Livity =

Studio album by Prince Far I
- Released: July 1981
- Recorded: 1981
- Studios: Channel One Studios, Kingston, Jamaica
- Genre: Reggae
- Label: PRE/Charisma
- Producer: Prince Far I

Prince Far I chronology
Showcase in a Suitcase (1980)	Livity (1981)	Voice of Thunder (1981)

Livity is a 1981 reggae album by Prince Far I. Livity is a word used by Rastafarians to refer to the energy or life-force that flows through all living things. The album is generally considered one of Prince Far I's weaker albums. As on many of his albums, the backing comes from the Roots Radics, under the guise of The Arabs. The album was mixed by Lancelot "Maxie" McKenzie.

== Track listing ==
1. "Reggae Music Moving"
2. "Badda Card"
3. "Some With Roof"
4. "Marble Stone"
5. "Put It Out"
6. "King Of Kings"
7. "River Jordan"
8. "Ghetto Living"
9. "Give Me For My Continent"
10. "Wish I Have A Wing"

== Reissues ==
The original album has never been re-released, but a 1990 CD compilation, Black Man Land, includes all but one track ('Give Me For My Continent') alongside tracks from 1978's Message from the King.
