= Rasta views of the afterlife =

Rastafari has diverse beliefs regarding the afterlife, salvation and death. Many Rastas believe in reincarnation or eternal life. These beliefs are usually informed by the idea of Jah as a divine presence inside every person, and therefore Rastas believe they can realise their own divinity through the practice of livity.

Traditionally, Rastas avoided funerals and the dead, meaning many received Christian funerals organised by their families after death, although this is beginning to change.

Paradise for Rastas is usually not an otherworldly place but a state of being that can be achieved on Earth—often as a return to Zion, or Africa, which is also called Ethiopia in the Bible. For Rastas, Ethiopia is the Promised Land which might be achieved either through a physical return to Africa or through spiritual fulfilment.

== Death and reincarnation ==
Rastas have traditionally avoided death and funerals as part of the Ital lifestyle, meaning that many were given Christian funerals by their relatives. This attitude to death is less common among more recent or moderate strands of Rastafari, with many considering death a natural part of life (and thus, they also do not expect immortality). Unlike other African diaspora religions, Rastas typically avoid ancestor veneration.

Rastas do not believe in a specific afterlife. Their views on death itself also vary. Traditionally, many Rastas believed in the possibility of eternal life, similar to Christians. In the 1980s, scholar of religion Leonard E. Barrett observed Jamaican Rastas who believed practitioners who died had not been faithful to Jah. He suggested that this attitude stemmed from the large numbers of young people in the movement, who had thus seen very few Rastas die. Another common Rasta view is that the righteous undergo reincarnation. When pressed by Barrett, one Rasta leader explained:

Even if a Rastafarian pass away because of old age he really is not dead. The atoms of his body pass back into the totality of things. These same atoms are again utilized into the formation of other newborn babies and life continues as before.

According to anthropologist Anna Waldstein, Rastafari practice often seeks to assert control over oneself while rejecting the external control of others as a way to resist the "master/slave" dynamic which is a legacy of the Atlantic slave trade on the African diaspora. She suggests this approach, which draws on East African and Hindu traditions, is a way to connect to the eternal "higher Self" which exists through multiple lifetimes and survives death of the earthly body. Despite this importance upon the higher Self, the body is considered the higher Self's "most important creation" because it is through this body that it can enact action in the present world. In this way, Rastafari sees body and soul as inextricably linked.

Barret also compares the Rastafari portrayal of the prophets to the Hindu concept of reincarnation, explaining that Moses, Elijah, Jesus and Haile Selassie are seen as avatars of Jah. Additionally, some denominations of Mansions of Rastafari identify Marcus Garvey as the reincarnation of John the Baptist. Social anthropologist Sheila Kitzinger has argued that reincarnation in Rastafari may be metaphorical, serving as "a reaffirmation of one's lost culture and African identity".

== Exile, judgment and salvation ==
Rastafari is sometimes described as a millenarian movement, because early in its development it espoused the idea that the present age would come to an apocalyptic end and Black people would be released from their oppression in the modern world. Rastafari teaches that the African diaspora are living as exiles in the Biblical "Babylon", and that they will be returned to "Zion" (or Africa) during the End Times. Babylon in this context refers to Western society, particularly in its corporate and materialistic state. Babylon is a symbol of European colonialism, white supremacy and global capitalism. Enforcers of the state, such as police and soldiers, are seen as Babylon's agents.

As the Old Testament recounts how the ancient Israelites were exiled to Mesopotamia during the Babylonian captivity, Rastas understand their own exile from Africa as a similar condition; thus the displacement of Africans during the slave trade is seen as an exile caused by the corruption of Babylon. Rastas describe this exile of the African diaspora in terms of great suffering.

In the New Testament, Babylon is used as a euphemism for the Roman Empire, which was prophesied to be destroyed in the Book of Revelation, making way for the Kingdom of God. Rastas see this as a description of the fall of Western colonialism, imperialism and white supremacy, which will be followed by the restoration of Zion—or Africa and its people.

Many practitioners believe that on the Day of Judgment, Babylon will be overthrown, with Rastas being among the chosen who survive. With Babylon destroyed, Rastas believe that humanity will enter a "new age", a millennium of peace, justice, and happiness in which the righteous shall live in Africa. In the 1980s, many Rastas believed that the Day of Judgment would happen around the year 2000. A view then common in the Rasta community was that the world's white people would wipe themselves out through nuclear war, with Africans able to rule the world, something they believed was prophesied in the Book of Daniel. (Note: Daniel 2:31–32)

=== The Promised Land ===
Rastas view the Promised Land, or Zion, as an ideal to which they aspire, as well as a physical place they can return to in Africa. It is not an afterlife, but a reward which will be granted to the faithful in this world. At the time of the Second Coming of Jesus (whom many Rastas believe was Haile Selassie I), the restoration of the Rastafari to Zion will begin. As with "Babylon", the name "Zion" comes from the Bible, although Rastas use it to refer to Africa as a whole, along with another Biblical name for the continent, "Ethiopia". Ghanaian Rastas, for instance, describe themselves as already living within Ethiopia. Other Rastas use the term "Zion" to mean the country of Ethiopia specifically, a free and decolonised Jamaica, or even a state of mind. Rastas believe that the literal or spiritual return to Africa will allow them to escape the domination and degradation they experience every day in Babylon.

A map of Ethiopia, sometimes identified as Zion by Rastas

While early Rastafari drew on the Back-to-Africa movement, emphasising the need for the African diaspora to be repatriated to Africa, this focus began to decline after the 1960s. Critics of the repatriation movement argued that the migration of the entire African diaspora to Africa, given the size of the diaspora and the politics involved, was implausible.

With the desire for physical repatriation to Africa relegated to a minor concern by the 1970s, a change partially influenced by observation of the 1983–1985 famine in Ethiopia, many Rastas came to see the idea of returning to Africa in a metaphorical sense. Africa can be a state of mind, or a state of harmony with nature in which Rastas can live wherever they are. This entails the restoration of their pride and self-confidence as people of African descent. The term "liberation before repatriation" began to be used within the movement, signifying this shift in emphasis.

Today, many Rastas seek to transform Western society so that they may more comfortably live within it rather than seeking to move to Africa. There are nevertheless some Rastas who continue to emphasise the need for physical resettlement of the African diaspora in Africa.
