= Cool Ruler =

Studio album by Gregory Isaacs
- Released: 1978
- Recorded: 1978
- Studio: Channel One Studios, Kingston, Jamaica
- Genre: Reggae
- Label: Front Line (UK)/African Museum (JA)
- Producer: Gregory Isaacs

Gregory Isaacs chronology
Mr. Isaacs (1977)	Cool Ruler (1978)	Soon Forward (1981)

Professional ratings
Review scores
Source	Rating
Allmusic	4.5/5 stars

Cool Ruler is a 1978 studio album by Gregory Isaacs, his first released on the Virgin Records subsidiary Front Line. The Jamaican release was on Isaacs' African Museum imprint. The album was produced by Isaacs and mixed by Lancelot "Maxie" McKenzie at Channel One Studios in Kingston, Jamaica. Of the tracks on the album, "Let's Dance" had previously been released as a single. Some of the tracks on the album are considered among the best ever recorded by Isaacs, although the album failed to give him the international breakthrough that had been anticipated. The album title did, however, endure as Isaacs' nickname. "John Public" was also released as a single. The album formed the basis of the dub album Slum in Dub, released the same year. Cool Ruler was reissued on compact disc by Virgin in 2000.

== Track listing ==
All tracks by Gregory Isaacs except where noted

1. "Native Woman" – 3:02
2. "John Public" – 3:06
3. "Party in the Slum" – 3:26
4. "Uncle Joe" – 3:50
5. "World of the Farmer" – 4:08
6. "One More Time" – 3:14
7. "Let's Dance" (John Holt) – 2:56
8. "Don't Pity Me" – 2:22
9. "Created by the Father" (Dennis Brown) – 2:31
10. "Raving Tonight" – 3:57

== Personnel ==
- Gregory Isaacs - vocals
- The Heptones - backing vocals
- The Revolutionaries - backing band
- Sly Dunbar - drums
- Robbie Shakespeare, Ernest Wilson - bass
- Eric "Bingy Bunny" Lamont, Earl "Chinna" Smith, Ranchie McLean - guitar
- Ansel Collins - keyboards
- Bobby Ellis - trumpet
- Tommy McCook - tenor saxophone
- Herman Marquis - alto saxophone

Technical

- Lancelot "Maxie" McKenzie - engineer
- Armet Francis - sleeve
- Dave Hendley - photography
