= Pressure Sounds =

British record label

- Founded: 1994
- Genre: Reggae
- Country of origin: United Kingdom
- Official website: pressure.co.uk

Pressure Sounds is a British DIY record label, specialising in releasing reggae music. Run by Pete Holdsworth, it is one of the most enduring reggae labels in the UK, specialising in reissuing obsolete tunes. It was originally a subsidiary of On-U Sound.

A couple of labels are closely associated with PS:

- Maximum Pressure which specialises in 1980s dancehall;
- Green Tea, which releases a broad variety of reggae music.

== Discography ==
- PS 001 – Santic + Friends – An Even Harder Shade of Black – 1995
- PS 002 – Prince Far I & The Arabs – Dub To Africa – 1995
- PS 003 – Israel Vibration – The Same Song – 1995
- PS 004 – Keith Hudson – Brand – 1995
- PS 005 – Various artists – Sounds & Pressure Volume 1 – 1995
- PS 006 – Little Roy with Ian, Rock, and The Heptones – Tafari Earth Uprising – 1996
- PS 007 – Prince Far I – Cry Tuff Dub Encounter Chapter 3 – 1996
- PS 008 – Enos McLeod – The Genius of Enos – 1996
- PS 009 – Lee Perry – Voodooism – 1996
- PS 010 – Various artists – Sounds & Pressure Volume 2 – 1996
- PS 011 – Earth & Stone – Kool Roots – 1997
- PS 012 – Carlton Patterson & King Tubby – Psalms of Drums: The Black and White Story – 1997
- PS 013 – Prince Far I & The Arabs – Cry Tuff Dub Encounter Chapter 1 – 1997
- PS 014 – Channel One – Well Cha'rged – 1997
- PS 015 – The Techniques – Techniques in Dub – 1997
- PS 016 – Various artists – Sounds & Pressure Volume 3 – 1997
- PS 017 – Various artists – Randy's 17 North Parade – 1997
- PS 018 – Prince Far I – Health and Strength – 1997
- PS 019 – Lee Perry – Produced & Directed by the Upsetter – 1998
- PS -20 – Derrick Harriott – Riding the Roots Chariot – 1998
- PS 021 – The Uniques – Watch This Sound – 1998
- PS 022 – Hitbound Selection – When the Dances Were Changing – 1998
- PS 023 – Various artists – Sounds & Pressure Volume 4 – 1999
- PS 024 – Various artists – Roots Techniques – 1999
- PS 025 – Prince Jammy – The Crowning of Prince Jammy – 1999
- PS 026 – Little Roy & Friends – Packin House – 1999
- PS 027 – Phil Pratt – Phil Pratt Thing – 1999
- PS 028 – Various artists – Don't Call Us Immigrants – 2000
- PS 029 – Augustus Pablo – El Rocker's – 2000
- PS 030 – Prince Jazzbo – Mr Funny – 2000
- PS 031 – Channel One – Maxfield Avenue Breakdown: Dubs and Instrumentals 1974-79 – 2000
- PS 032 – Lee Perry – Divine Madness...Definitely – 2001
- PS 033 – Burning Spear – Spear Burning – 2001
- PS 034 – Tubby's – Firehouse Revolution: King Tubby's Productions in the Digital Era 1985-89 – 2001
- PS 035 – Prince Far I – Psalms For I – 2002
- PS 036 – The Royals – Pick Up the Pieces – 2002
- PS 037 – Joe Gibbs & The Professionals – No Bones for the Dogs: Dubs from the Mighty Two 1974 to 1979 – 2002
- PS 038 – Augustus Pablo – In Fine Style: Original Rockers: 7" and 12" selection 1973-1979 – 2003
- PS 039 – Dennis Bovell – Decibel: More Cuts & Dubs 1976-1983 – 2003
- PS 040 – Various artists – Red Bumb Ball: Rare & Unreleased Rocksteady 1966-1968 – 2003
- PS 041 – Various artists – Sounds & Pressure Volume 5 – 2003
- PS 042 – The Wailing Souls – The Wailing Souls at Channel One: 7's, 12's and Versions – 2004
- PS 043 – Sly & Robbie – Unmetered Taxi: Taxi Productions – 2004
- PS 044 – The Royals – Dubbing with The Royals – 2004
- PS 045 – Various artists – Aquarius Rock: The Hip Reggae World of Herman Chin-Loy – 2004
- PS 046 – Various artists – Down Santic Way: Santic Jamaican Productions – 2005
- PS 047 – Phil Pratt & Friends – Safe Travel: The Rare Side of Rock Steady with Phil Pratt & Friends: 1966-1968 – 2005
- PS 048 – Peter Tosh – Talking Revolution: Live at the One Love Peace Concert 1978 – 2005
- PS 049 – The Travellers – Black Black Minds – 2005
- PS 050 – Various artists – More Pressure Volume One – Straight to the Head – 2006
- PS 051 – Various artists – Take Me To Jamaica: The Story of Jamaican Mento – 2006
- PS 052 – The Talent Corporation – Life Goes in Circles: Sounds from The Talent Corporation 1974-1979 – 2006
- PS 053 – Keith Hudson & The Soul Syndicate – Nuh Skin Up – 2007
- PS 054 – Keith Hudson – Brand: Creative Reggae Instrumental Dub | The Joint – 2007
- PS 055 – The Revolutionaries – Drum Sound: More Gems from the Channel One Dub Room - 1974 to 1980 – 2007
- PS 056 – Native – Rockstone: Native's Adventures with Lee Perry at the Black Ark... September 1977 – 2007
- PS 057 – Bim Sherman – Tribulation: Down in Jamdown 1974 to 1979 – 2007
- PS 058 – Joe Higgs – Life Of Contradiction – 2008
- PS 059 – Micron Music Limited – 'Every Mouth Must Be Fed': 1973 to 1976 – 2008
- PS 060 – DJ Kentaro – Tuff Cuts – 2008
- PS 061 – Jimmy Radway & The Fe Me Time All Stars – Dub I – 2008
- PS 062 – Various Artists – Once Upon a Time at King Tubby's – 2009
- PS 063 – Tommy McCook & The Supersonics – Pleasure Dub – 2009
- PS 064 – Delroy Wilson – Dub Plate Style: Remixed by Prince Jammy 1978 – 2009
- PS 065 – King Tubby & The Clancy Eccles All Stars – Sound System International Dub LP – 2009
- PS 066 – Santic Record Co. – Harder Shade of Black – 2010
- PS 067 – Prince Jammy – Strictly Dub – 2010
- PS 068 – Lee Perry & The Upsetters – Sound System Scratch: Dub Plate Mixes 1973 to 1979 – 2010
- PS 069 – The Uniques – Absolutely Rock Steady – 2010
- PS 070 – Lee Perry & The Upsetters – The Return of Sound System Scratch: More Lee Perry Dub Plate Mixes and Rarities 1973 to 1979 – 2011
- PS 071 – Augustus Pablo – Message Music: Augustus Pablo's Digital Productions 1986-1994 – 2011
- PS 072 – The Sunshot Band – Dial M For Murder: In Dub Style – 2011
- PS 073 – Lee Perry & The Upsetters – High Plains Drifter: Jamaican 45's 1968-73 – 2012
- PS 074 – Various artists – Listen To The Music: Caltone's Jamaican 45's 1966-69 – 2012
- PS 075 – Dennis Bovell – Mek It Run – 2012
- PS 076 – Lee Perry and The Sufferer's – The Sound Doctor: Black Ark Singles and Dub Plates 1972-1978 – 2012
- PS 077 – Yabby You – Deeper Roots: Dub Plates and Rarities 1976-1978 – 2012
- PSDD101 – Various Artists – More Ideas 1988 – 2012
- PS 078 – Third World All Stars – Rebel Rock – 2013
- PS 079 – Bobby Kalphat and The Sun Shot All Stars – Zion Hill – 2013
- PS 080 – Joe Higgs – Unity is Power – 2013
- PS 081 – Tommy McCook – Reggae In Jazz – 2013
- PS 082 – Lee Perry & The Upsetters – Roaring Lion: 16 Untamed Black Art Masters & Dub Plates – 2013
- PS 083 – Horace Andy – Get Wise – 2014
- PS 084 – Yabby You & The Prophets – Deeper Roots Part 2: More Dubs & Rarities – 2014
- PS 085 – Bunny 'Striker' Lee – Full Up: Bunny 'Striker' Lee's Early Reggae Productions 1968-72 – 2014
- PS 086 – Inturns – Consider Yourself – 2014
- PS 087 – Jimmy Riley – Live It To Know It: Self-Productions, Protest Songs & Dub Plates 1975-1985 – 2015
- PS 088 – Bunny Lee & Friends – Next Cut! Dub Plates, Rare Sides & Unreleased Cuts – 2015
- PS 089 – Lee Perry – Mr Perry I Presume – 2015
- PS 090 – Skin Flesh & Bones – Dub In Blood – 2016
- PS 091 – Bunny Lee & Friends – Tape Rolling: On Wax and in the Studio 1971-74 – 2016
- PS 092 – Yabby You & Prophets – Beware Dub: An Expanded Version of the Classic Album – 2016
- PS 093 – Lloyd Parks – Time A Go Dread – 2016
- PS 094 – King Tubby & Aggrovators – Dubbing In The Back Yard – 2017
- PS 095 – Delroy Wilson – Go Away Dream – 2017
- PS 096 – Lloyd Parks & We The People – Meet The People – 2017
- PS 097 – Bunny Lee & The Aggrovators – Super Dub Disco Style – 2018
- PS 098 – Tommy McCook & The Aggrovators – Super Star: Disco Rockers – 2018
- PS 099 – Phil Pratt & Revolutionaries – The War Is On: Dub Style – 2018
- PS 100 – I-Mo-Jah – Rockers from the Land of Reggae – 2018
- PS 101 – Philip Fullwood – Words In Dub – 2018
- PS 102 – Bunny Lee, Prince Jammy, Aggrovators – Dubbing In The Front Yard & Conflict Dub: Two Lost Dub Albums Mixed by Prince Jammy at King Tubby's – 2019
- PS 103 – Yabby You & King Tubby – Walls of Jerusalem: With Unreleased Mixes and Studio Outtakes – 2019
- PS 104 – Various Artists – Rubadub Revolution: Early Dnacehall Productions from Bunny Lee – 2019
- PS 105 – The Prophets – King Tubby's Prophecies of Dub – 2020
- PS 106 – Various Artists – When Jah Shall Come: Heavy Roots Selection – 2020
- PS 107 – Yabby You & The Prophets – Conquering Lion (Expanded Edition) – 2020
- PS 108 – Lee Perry & Friends – Black Art from the Black Ark – 2021
- PS 109 – Barry Brown – Praises: Mixed by Paolo Baldini Dubfiles – 2021
- PS 110 – Yabby You & The Prophets – The Yabby You Sound: Dubs & Versions – 2022
- PS 111 – Patrick Andy – Living in Mount Zion – 2022
- PS 112 – Al Brown & Inner Force – Dub Cuts: Mixed by Paolo Baldini Dubfiles – 2022
- ______ – Various artists – Kingston Shuffle – 2022
- PS 113 – Herman Chin Loy – Musicism Dub: Herman Chin Loy at Aquarius Studio – 2023
- PS 114 – The Skatalites – Ska Boo-D-Ba: Top Sounds from Top Deck – 2023
- PS 115 – Various artists – Ska Shots – 2024
- PS 116 – Cedric 'Im' Brooks – United Africa – 2026
