= The Morwells =

- Origin: Kingston, Jamaica
- Genres: Reggae
- Years active: 1973–1980
- Labels: Morwell Esq., Trojan
- Past members: Eric "Bingy Bunny" Lamont; Maurice Wellington; Louis Davis; Errol Holt

The Morwells aka Morwell Unlimited were a Jamaican reggae band formed in 1973 by Maurice Wellington and Eric "Bingy Bunny" Lamont. They disbanded in the early 1980s with members going on to form the Roots Radics.

== History ==
The band formed in 1973 and comprised Eric "Bingy Bunny" Lamont and Maurice "Blacka" Wellington, childhood friends from Kingston's Trenchtown area. Prior to forming the band, Lamont had previously recorded with Bongo Herman for producer Derrick Harriott, while Wellington had worked as a record salesman and freelance producer. They initially released their recordings on their own Morwell Esquire label. The band expanded to a trio in 1974 with the addition of Louis Davis, formerly of The Versatiles alongside Junior Byles. Davis was a talented arranger and also taught Lamont to play guitar. They had a series of successful singles in the mid-1970s, and received sufficient interest in the United Kingdom to establish a distribution deal. Their first two albums, Presenting The Morwells and its King Tubby-mixed dub counterpart Dub Me, were issued in 1975. Wellington began working as a studio engineer and producer for Joe Gibbs in 1976, working on the early recordings by Culture, while Lamont joined The Revolutionaries as rhythm guitarist, although they continued to work as The Morwells. Their new connections gave them access to much of Jamaica's musical talent of the era, and in 1977 they were joined by bassist Errol Holt. Further albums followed in the late 1970s and early 1980s, although the group had stopped working together in 1980. Holt and Lamont continued with the Roots Radics, the band that they had formed in 1978, while Wellington concentrated on production (including several records by his brother, the deejay Nicodemus) and continued to run the Morwell label, later moving to New York City.

Lamont died of prostate cancer in December 1993, and Wellington, after returning to Jamaica in 1998, died in October 2000 from adenocarcinoma.

== Discography ==
Albums

- Presenting the Morwells (1975), Morwell Esq.
- Dub Me (1975), Morwell Esq.
- Crab Race (1977), Burning Sounds
- Cool Runnings (1979), Bushranger
- A1 Dub (1980), Trojan
- Kingston 12 Toughie (1980), Carib Gems
- Bingy Bunny and the Morwells (1981)
- Best of the Morwells (1981), Nighthawk
- Bingy Bunny & Morwells (1982), Park Heights
- Kingston 12 Toughie (A Tribute To Bingy Bunny) (1996), RAS

Contributing artists

- The Rough Guide to Dub (2005), World Music Network
