= Umkhonto =

Umkhonto may refer to:

- Umkhonto, the Zulu word for spear
- SAS Umkhonto, a South African Navy submarine
- Umkhonto (missile), a South African surface-to-air missile
- Umkhonto we Sizwe, the military wing of the African National Congress (ANC) in South Africa.
- Umkhonto We Sizwe (Spear of the Nation), a reggae album by Prince Far I
