= Be More Pirate =

Non-friction book

Be More Pirate: Or How To Take On The World And Win
- Author: Sam Conniff
- Publisher: Penguin Random House, Simon & Schuster
- Publication date: May 5, 2018
- ISBN: 978-1982109615 ISBN 978-0241307885 (UK)
- Website: Official website

Be More Pirate: Or How To Take On The World And Win is a non-fiction book written by entrepreneur Sam Conniff. The book discusses the history of the Gold Age Pirates, presenting their traits as leaders as inspiration for entrepreneurs working in the 21st century.

== History ==
Be More Pirate was written by entrepreneur and Livity Africa co-founder Sam Conniff. It was originally published in 2018 by Penguin Random House in the United Kingdom and in 2019 by Simon & Schuster in the United States. When the book was launched, Conniff flyposted the office of his UK publisher to advertise the book. The advertisement was not authorised by the publisher, but was said to be similar to the "good trouble" philosophy he talks about in the book. Conniff also projected messages on the side of the Parliament building addressed to Donald Trump and Theresa May in July 2018, coinciding with the book being picked up by his U.S. publisher. Be More Pirate has since been published in multiple languages.

== Summary ==
Conniff writes about how current young generations are challenging and reshaping systems. He draws a comparison between people who are considered do-it-yourselfers, side hustlers, and the Golden Age Pirates. The book offers advice for people who want to rewrite the outdated rules of the 21st Century, using strategies created by pirates like Sir Henry Morgan and Anne Bonney, and shows how they parallel modern entrepreneurs such as Elon Musk and Malala. The book shows how these strategies can be applied to modern life.

== Reception ==
The Sunday Times wrote that Be More Pirate had started a "movement," referencing the number of book readers who have been inspired by the book to carry out rebellious acts of positive change as a result. The Evening Standard stated that it makes "modern-day heroes of names lost in history." The Financial Times named it one of their Business Books Of The Month in May 2018.
