= Night nurse =

Night nurse may refer to:

- A nurse who works an overnight shift

== Film ==
- Night Nurse (1931 film), starring Barbara Stanwyck
- The Night Nurse, a 1977 Australian television film
- Night Nurse (1979 film), starring Gloria Guida
- Night Nurse (2026 film), an American erotic thriller film

== Music ==
- Nightnurse, a 1990s English rock band
- Night Nurse (album), by Gregory Isaacs (1982)
  - "Night Nurse" (Gregory Isaacs song), the title track, later a hit in 1997 for Sly & Robbie featuring Simply Red
- "Night Nurse" (Cascada song) (2011)
- "Night Nurse", a song by Dean & Britta from L'Avventura (2003)

== Other uses ==
- Night Nurse (comics), a 1972–73 Marvel Comics title and character
- Night Nurse (horse) (1971–1999), a National Hunt racehorse
- Night Nurse, an over the counter cold and flu remedy by GlaxoSmithKline
