= Night Nurse (album) =

Studio album by Gregory Isaacs
- Released: 1982
- Studios: Tuff Gong, Kingston, Jamaica
- Genre: Reggae
- Length: 33:27
- Labels: African Museum, Island, Mango
- Producers: Gregory Isaacs, Errol Flabba Holt

Gregory Isaacs chronology
Mr. Isaacs (1982)	Night Nurse (1982)	Crucial Cuts (1983)

Professional ratings
Review scores
Source	Rating
AllMusic	5/5 stars
Rolling Stone	4/5 stars

"Night Nurse"
Night Nurse audio sample

Night Nurse is a 1982 studio album by Gregory Isaacs.

Night Nurse is reggae artist Gregory Isaacs' most well-known album. It contains his biggest hit, "Night Nurse" as well as several other notable tracks. Backing came from the Roots Radics, with additional synthesizer added by Wally Badarou. The album was released on vinyl and cassette, then later in 1990 on compact disc. It reached No. 32 on the UK Albums Chart. A reissue released in 2002 includes four additional bonus tracks.

== Track listing ==
All tracks composed by Gregory Isaacs and Sylvester Weise.

1. "Night Nurse" – 4:04
2. "Stranger in Town" – 3:32
3. "Objection Overruled" – 3:56
4. "Hot Stepper" – 4:29
5. "Cool Down the Pace" – 5:16
6. "Material Man" – 3:34
7. "Not the Way" – 3:49
8. "Sad to Know (You're Leaving)" – 4:12

Bonus tracks on CD 2002 reissue

1. "Cool Down the Dub"
2. "Night Nurse Dub 2"
3. "Cool Down the Pace" - (10" mix)
4. "Unhappy Departure Dub"

== Personnel ==
- Gregory Isaacs - vocals

The Roots Radics

- Errol "Flabba" Holt - bass guitar, associate producer
- Lincoln "Style" Scott - drums
- Dwight "Brother Dee" Pinkney - lead guitar
- Eric "Bingy Bunny" Lamont - rhythm guitar
- Wycliffe "Steelie" Johnson - keyboards

with:

- Wally Badarou - Prophet synthesizer, synthesizer

Technical

- Errol Brown - engineer
- Godwin Logie - mixing at Compass Point Studios, Nassau, Bahamas
- Don Taylor Artist Management - direction
- Stylo Rouge - art direction
- Johnnie Black - photography

== Certifications ==
Region	Certification	Certified units/sales
United Kingdom (BPI)	Silver	60,000^{‡}
^{‡} Sales+streaming figures based on certification alone.
