= Voice of Thunder =

Studio album by Prince Far I
- Released: 1981
- Recorded: 1981
- Studio: Channel One Studios, Kingston, Jamaica
- Genre: Reggae
- Label: Trojan Records
- Producer: Michael Williams (Prince Far I)

Prince Far I chronology
Livity (1981)	Voice of Thunder (1981)	Cry Tuff Dub Encounter Chapter Four (1982)

Professional ratings
Review scores
Source	Rating
Allmusic	3/5 stars
The Encyclopedia of Popular Music	4/5 stars

Voice of Thunder is a reggae album by Prince Far I, released by Trojan Records in 1981.

== Track listing ==
All titles written by Michael Williams.

1. "Ten Commandments"
2. "Tribute to Bob Marley"
3. "Hold the Fort"
4. "Every Time I Hear the Word"
5. "Head of the Buccaneer"
6. "Shall Not Dwell in Wickedness"
7. "Give I Strength"
8. "Kingdom of God"
9. "Coming in from the Rock"
10. "Skinhead"
