= Crab Records =

- Parent company: Pama Records
- Founded: 1968
- Defunct: 1971
- Status: Defunct
- Distributor: Phoenix Music International
- Genre: Reggae
- Country of origin: United Kingdom

Crab Records was a reggae label that issued releases from 1968 to 1971. Crab was a subsidiary of Pama Records, which, along with Trojan Records, was one of the major labels for reggae music in the UK. Derrick Morgan was the main artist featured on the label, which issued his self-produced records. Crab Records is now owned by Phoenix Music International, which continues to distribute the Crab and Pama labels digitally.

== Discography ==
- 1 The Versatiles - Children Get Ready / Someone To Love 7"
- 2 The Ethiopians - Fire A Muss Muss Tail / Blacker Black 7"
- 3 Derrick Morgan - River To The Bank / Reggae Limbo 7" B side - Peter King
- 4 The Ethiopians - Reggae Hit The Town / Ding Dong Bell 7"
- 5 The Versatiles - Spread Your Bed / Worries A Yard 7"
- 6 Val Bennett - Reggae City / Mellow Trumpet 7" B side - Cannon King
- 7 The Ethiopians - I'm A King / What A Big Surprise 7"
- 8 Derrick Morgan - Seven Letters / Lonely Heartaches 7" B side - The Tartons
- 9 Ernest Wilson - Private Number / Another Chance 7"
- 10 Dennis Walks - The Drifter / Run Girl Run 7" B Side - GG Grossett
- 11 Derrick Morgan - The First Taste Of Love / Dance All Night 7"
- 12 The Viceroys - Work It / You Mean So Much To Me 7"
- 13 The Paragons - Take Your Hand From My Neck / Equality And Justice 7"
- 14 The Caribbeans - Please Please / Destroyer 7" B Side - Matadors
- 15 The Melodians - When There Is You / My Woman's Love 7" B Side - Slim Smith & Uniques
- 16 Vin Gordon - Walking By / Promises Promises 7" B Side - The Viceroys
- 17 Ernest Wilson - Freedom Train / You Should Never Have To Come 7" B Side - Stranger Cole
- 18 Derrick Morgan - Don't Play That Song / How Can I Forget You 7"
- 19 The Kingstonians - Hold Down / Who Will She Be 7" B Side - Barry York
- 20 Rudy Mills - Tears On My Pillow / I'm Trapped 7"
- 21 Ernest Wilson & Freddie - Just Once In My Life / Mighty Organ 7" B side - Glen Adams
- 22 Derrick Morgan - Mek It Tan Deh / Gimme Back 7"
- 23 Derrick Morgan - Send Me Some Loving / Come What May 7"
- 23 Duplicate (white label) issue Derrick Morgan - Send Me Some Loving / Gimme Back 7"
- 24 Rudy Mills - A Heavy Load / Wholesale Love 7"
- 25 Theo Beckford - Brother Ram Goat / What A Condition 7" B Side - Starlighters
- 26 The Tennors - Baff Boom / Feel Bad 7"
- 27 The Viceroys - Death A Come / The Sword 7" B Side - Matador All Stars
- 28 Derrick Morgan - Hard Time / Death Rides A Horse 7" B Side - Roy Richards
- 29 The Tennors - True Brothers / Sign Of The Times 7"
- 30 Derrick Morgan - Man Pon Moon / What A Thing 7"
- 31 Bruce Ruffin - Long About Now / They Got To Move 7" B Side - Lloyd Robinson
- 32 Derrick Morgan - Moon Hop / Harris Wheel 7" B Side - Reggaeites
- 32 Duplicate (white label) issue Busty Brown - Broken Heart / Tribute To A King 7"
- 33 G G Grossett - Greater Sounds / Live The Life I Love 7"
- 35 Rupie Edwards - Long Lost Love / Uncertain Love 7"
- 36 The Tennors - I Want Everything / Cherry 7"
- 37 Eric Barnet - Quaker City / Double Up 7"
- 38 The Tender Tones - Devil Woman / Nobody Cares 7"
- 39 Little Roy - Without My Love / Here I Come Again 7" B Side - Winston Samuels
- 40 Winston Blake & Rupie Edwards - Big Thing / Exclusively Yours 7"
- 41 Rupie Edwards - Never Miss / Redemption 7"
- 42 Ernest Wilson - My Elusive Dreams / Hee Cup 7" B Side - Sir Happy
- 44 Derrick Morgan - A Night At The Hop / Telephone 7"
- 45 Ernest Wilson - Sentimental Man / It's A Lie 7"
- 46 Derrick Morgan - Oh Baby / The Rat 7" B Side - The Thunderbirds
- 47 Derrick & Jennifer - Need To Belong / Let's Have Some Fun 7"
- 48 Bim, Bam & Clover - The Pill / Spring Fever 7" B Side - Tommy McCook
- 49 Bim, Bam & Clover - Immigrant's Flight / Bang Shangalang 7" B Side - Peter Austin & Hortense
- 50 U B Barrett - Thinking About My Baby / I Wonder 7"
- 51 Derrick Morgan - I Wish I Was An Apple / The Story 7"
- 52 Derrick Morgan & Owen Gray - Take A Letter Maria / Just A Little Loving 7"
- 53 Denzil Dennis - Rain Is Gonna Fall / This Game Ain't Fair 7"
- 54 Derrick & Jennifer - Rocking Good Way / Wipe These Tears 7"
- 55 Jennifer Jones - Tennants / Western Standard Time 7" B Side - Reco Rodriguez
- 56 Bim & Clover - I Am Disgusted / Fire In Me Wire 7"
- 57 Derrick Morgan - My Dickie / Brixton Hop 7"
- 58 Derrick Morgan - I Can't Stand It No Longer / Beyond The Wall 7"
- 59 Derrick Morgan - Endlessly / Who's Making Love 7"
- 60 D D Dennis - Having A Party / Man With Ambition 7"
- 61 Joan Ross - Band Of Gold / Midnight Sunshine 7" B Side - The Hammers
- 62 Derrick Morgan - Hurt Me / Julia 7"
- 63 Winston Groovy - I Like The Way / Tell Me Why 7"
- 64 Winston Groovy - I've Got To Find A Way To Win Mary Back / Wanna Be There 7"
- 65 Rip 'n' Lan - In The Ghetto / Something Sweet 7"
- 66 The Invitations - Birmingham Cat / Now You're On Your Own 7"
- 67 Derrick Morgan - Searching So Long / Drums Of Passion 7"

== See also ==
- List of record labels
