= Delano Stewart =

Jamaican singer (born 1947)

- Born: Winston Stewart; 5 January 1947 (age 78); Kingston, Jamaica
- Genres: Ska, rocksteady, reggae
- Years active: Late 1950s–present
- Labels: High Note

Winston "Delano" Stewart (born 5 January 1947) is a Jamaican singer who had success in the 1960s with The Gaylads before establishing himself as a solo artist.

Born in Kingston, Stewart was half of the duo Winston and Bibby, along with B.B. Seaton. The two formed the Gaylads along with Maurice Roberts in the late 1950s. Stewart left the group in the late 1960s, having already recorded a handful of solo singles, and recorded as a solo artist for producer Sonia Pottinger. In 1969 he relocated to the United States.

An album of his recordings for Pottinger was released in 1970. A compilation of his solo work up to 1973 was released in 2001.

Stewart reunited with Seaton in 1991 for a concert celebrating Studio One. The two then reunited with Maurice Roberts for a Gaylads reunion show.

One of Stewart's biggest hits, "Stay a Little Bit Longer", was recorded by UB40 on their album Labour of Love III.

== Discography ==
=== Singles ===
- "All My Love" (1962), Worldisc
- "Lover Man" (1963), R&B
- "How Many Times" (1965), Mu-zik City
- "Day After Day" (1965), Punch (B-side of Andy & Clyde's "Lonesome")
- "I Don't Know Why I Love You", Doctor Bird (B-side of The Gaylads' "You Should Never Do That")
- "That's Life" (1968), Doctor Bird
- "Got to Come Back" (1969), High Note
- "Stay a Little Bit Longer" (1970), High Note
- "Heart of Stone" (1976), Timbrell
- "Spinning Wheel" (1976), Timbrell
- "Leave Me Alone", Coxsone
- "Eternal Love", Joe Frasier (AA-side of Leroy Sibbles' "Sweet Sensation")

=== Albums ===
- Stay a Little Bit Longer (1970), High Note/Trojan
- Stay a Little Bit Longer...and a Bit Longer Still (2001), Westside
