= Psalms for I =

Studio album by Prince Far I
- Released: 1976
- Studio: King Tubby's and Randy's Studio, Kingston, Jamaica
- Genre: Reggae
- Length: 31:02
- Label: Carib Gems
- Producer: Ivanhoe "Lloydie Slim" Smith

Prince Far I chronology
Psalms for I (1976)	Under Heavy Manners (1977)

Professional ratings
Review scores
Source	Rating
Allmusic	4/5 stars
The Encyclopedia of Popular Music	4/5 stars

Psalms for I is the debut album by reggae chanter Prince Far I, recorded in 1975 and released on the Carib Gems label in 1976. The album features nine tracks based on psalms and "The Lord's Prayer", over rhythms largely played by The Aggrovators and produced by Bunny Lee, notable exceptions being the "Psalm 24" rhythm, which was produced by Alton Ellis. "Psalm 53" used the rhythm from the Lee "Scratch" Perry-produced "Mighty Cloud of Joy". It was described by Mark Perry in a review in his Sniffin' Glue magazine as "a plastic Bible that goes round and round".

The album gives: "Special thanks to Lee Perry, Bunny Lee and Roger Campbell who helped to make it happen."

The album was reissued on CD in 1994 on the German Fotofon label, and in 2002 by Pressure Sounds with one bonus track.

== Track listing ==
1. "Psalm 49"
2. "Psalm 48"
3. "Psalm 24"
4. "Psalm 87"
5. "The Lord's Prayer"
6. "Psalm 95"
7. "Psalm 53"
8. "Psalm 23"
9. "Psalm 2"
10. "Psalm 1"

The 2002 CD re-issue also included a track "Record Smith and The All Stars - Psalm 48 Version" after Psalm 48.

== Personnel ==
- The Aggrovators - backing band
- The Upsetters - backing band on "Psalm 53"
- The Underground Vegetables - backing band on "Psalm 24"
- Bunny Lee - rhythm producer
- Alton Ellis - rhythm producer on "Psalm 24"
- Lee "Scratch" Perry - rhythm producer on "Psalm 53"
