= Under Heavy Manners =

Studio album by Prince Far I
- Released: 1976
- Studio: Joe Gibbs Recording Studio, 25 Retirement Crescent, Kingston 5, Jamaica
- Genre: Reggae
- Length: 31:34
- Label: Joe Gibbs Music
- Producer: The Mighty Two (Errol Thompson, Joe Gibbs)

Prince Far I chronology
Psalms For I (1975)	Under Heavy Manners (1976)	Message from the King (1978)

Professional ratings
Review scores
Source	Rating
AllMusic	4.5/5 stars
The Encyclopedia of Popular Music	4/5 stars

Under Heavy Manners is a reggae album by Prince Far I, released in 1976. The featured backing musicians were Joe Gibbs' house band, the Professionals.

Heavy Manners refers to the state of emergency declared in Jamaica in 1976.

== Track listing ==
All tracks composed by Joe Gibbs; except where indicated

1. "Rain a Fall"
2. "Big Fight"
3. "You I Love and Not Another"
4. "Young Generation"
5. "Shine Eye Gal" (Errol Thompson)
6. "Boz Rock"
7. "Show Me Mine Enemy"
8. "Shadow"
9. "Deck of Cards"
10. "Heavy Manners"
