= Friends (Sly and Robbie album) =

Studio album by Sly and Robbie
- Released: 1997 / March 24, 1998
- Genre: Reggae
- Length: 59:35
- Label: EastWest
- Producers: Sly and Robbie

Professional ratings
Review scores
Source	Rating
AllMusic	2.5/5 stars

Friends is a 1997 studio album by the Jamaican rhythm section and production duo Sly and Robbie, released in 1997. It was released in the U.S. the following year. In 1999, the album earned the duo the Grammy Award for Best Reggae Album. Two singles, "Night Nurse" and "Penny Lover", both cover versions, charted in the UK, reaching numbers 13 and 94 respectively.

== Track listing ==
1. "Friday" (Dunbar, Robert Lyn, Shakespeare, Lloyd Willis) – 3:57
2. "Night Nurse" (Gregory Isaacs, Sylvester Wiese) – 3:52
3. "Seems to Me I'm Losing" (Dobby Dobson) – 3:39
4. "Only a Smile" (John Holt) – 3:37
5. "You'd Be So Nice to Come Home To" (Cole Porter) – 4:00
6. "Penny Lover" (Harvey Ritchie, Lionel Richie) – 3:55
7. "Theme from Mission: Impossible" (Lalo Schifrin) – 3:59
8. "Candy Girl" (Dunbar, Danny Madden, Handel Tucker, Lloyd Willis) – 4:03
9. "Ghetto Girl" (Dennis Brown) – 3:50
10. "All This Love" (El DeBarge) – 4:02
11. "Shoulder to Cry On" (Gary Benson, Winston Sela) – 4:55
12. "(I Can't Get No) Satisfaction" (Mick Jagger, Keith Richards) – 4:00
13. "Night Nurse" (Jah Wobble Radio Mix) (Gregory Isaacs, Sylvester Wiese) – 3:37
14. "Friday" (Street Mix) (Dunbar, Robert Lyn, Shakespeare, Lloyd Willis) – 4:04
15. "Candy Girl" (Street Mix) (Dunbar, Madden, Handel Tucker, Lloyd Willis) – 4:05

== Personnel ==
- Robbie Shakespeare - bass
- Sly Dunbar - drums
- Lloyd "Gitsy" Willis - guitar (tracks: 1, 2, 5, 7, 9, 13, 14)
- Robbie Lyn - keyboards (tracks: 1 to 6, 8 to 11, 13 to 15)
- Ambelique - vocals (racks: 6,12)
- One Plus One - vocals (tracks: 4, 5, 10, 12)
- Engineered by Lynford "Fatta" Marshalls (tracks: 1, 2, 4, 5, 8, 9, 11, 13), Collin "Bulby" York (tracks: 10, 12), Terry Manning (track: 3), Jason Sterling & Orville Baker (track: 6), Hugh Palmer (track: 7)
- Produced & mixed by Sly Dunbar & Robbie Shakespeare
