= Enos McLeod =

- Born: 1946 (age 78–79)
- Origin: Kingston, Jamaica
- Genres: Reggae
- Occupations: Singer, songwriter, music producer
- Years active: Mid 1960s–present

Enos McLeod (born 1946) is a Jamaican reggae singer and music producer whose career dates to the mid-1960s.

== Biography ==
McLeod was born in 1946 in Trenchtown, Kingston, Jamaica, and before his career in music he trained as a cabinet-maker and a boxer. His debut release was "Mackie", which was produced by Sid Bucknor, who at the time was the resident engineer at Studio One. Under Bucknor's tutelage, McLeod learned the basics of record production, soon having success with late 1960s releases such as "Young Love" by Lloyd Clarke. His production work included recordings with some of Jamaica's top singers, including Gregory Isaacs, Ken Boothe, and The Gaylads. McLeod also produced the first recording by Michael Williams credited to Prince Far I, previous recordings being issued under the name King Cry Cry, with the new stage name given to Williams by McLeod. McLeod also produced Augustus Pablo's 1975 album Thriller. McLeod continued to work as a singer, having hits in Jamaica with singles such as "Tel Aviv", "Hi-Jacking", and "If You Love Jah", and the combination hits "Jestering" (with Shorty the President) and "Jericho" (with The Mighty Diamonds).

In the mid-1970s, McLeod's boxing skills saw him employed by Joe Gibbs as a bouncer at the latter's recording studio on Retirement Crescent, also working on recording sessions with resident engineer Errol Thompson, with McLeod vocal sides from this era including "Money Worries", and his biggest hit, "By the Look", a version of the Dennis Brown hit, "Cheater". He also recorded several singles under the name Preacher including "Black Moses", "Psalms of David" and "Rhythm Bible".

McLeod continued recording sporadically, and became based in Europe from the 1990s.

== Discography ==
- By the Look in Your Eyes (1978)-Soul Beat
- Ram Jam Party (1996)-President
- Dance Hall Style (1997)
- Love of My Life (2005)-Orbit

Compilations:

- Telaviv (1981)-Orbit
- Goodies Best (1995)-Century
- Enos in Dub (1995)-Century
- The Genius of Enos (1996)-Pressure Sounds
- Reggae Mix-Tures (2003)-Century
- Enos McLeod & Friends
