= The Versatiles =

Jamaican reggae group

The Versatiles were a Jamaican reggae group, formed in 1967 by Junior Byles, Louie Davis and Dudley Earl. In 1970 Byles left the group for a successful solo career.

== Discography ==
- "The Time Has Come" (1968)
- "Cutting rasor" (1974)

== See also ==
- Crab Records
- John Peel's Record Box
