= B. B. Seaton =

Jamaican reggae singer-songwriter (1944–2024)

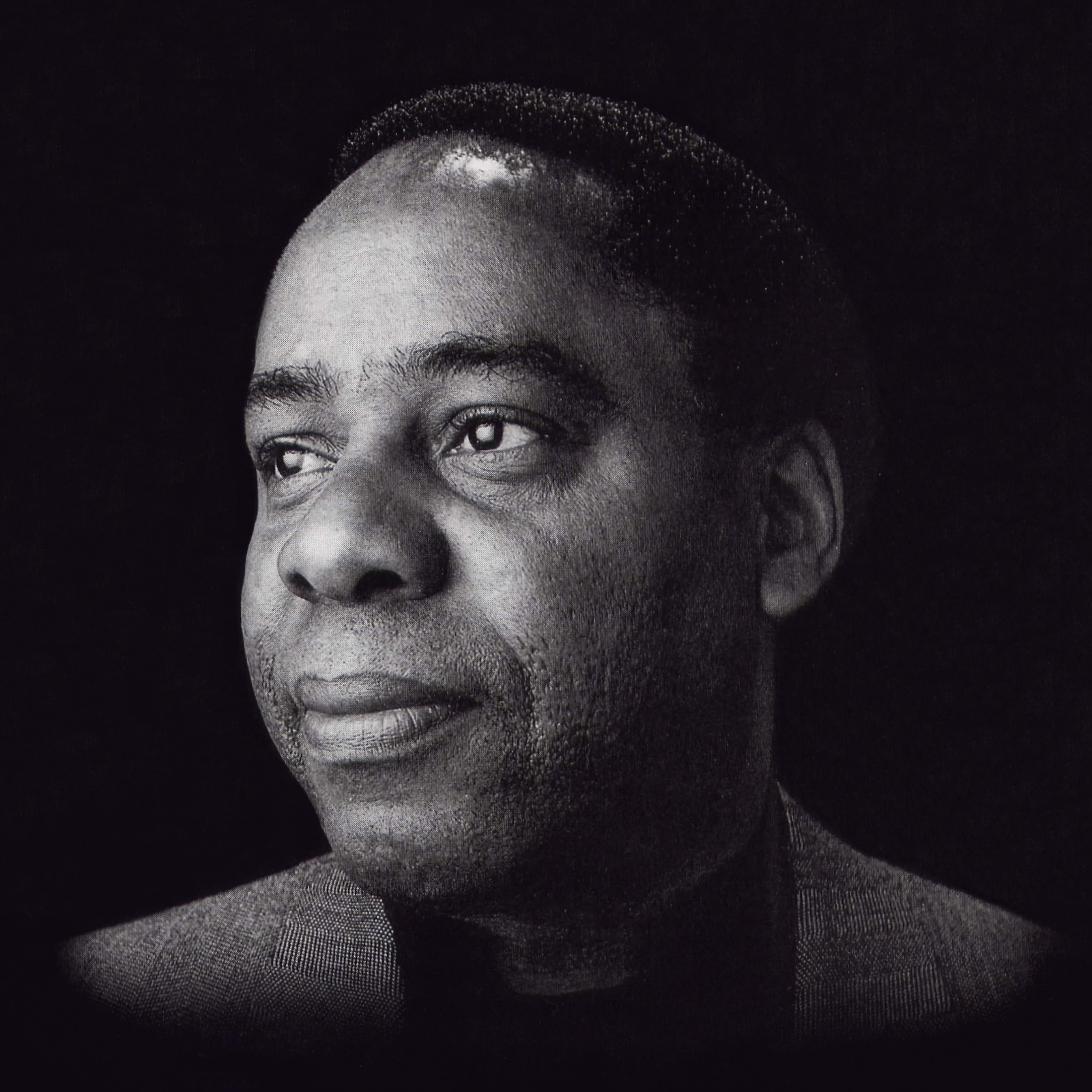

Background information
- Born: Harris Lloyd Seaton; 3 September 1944; Kingston, Jamaica
- Died: 4 March 2024 (aged 79) London, England
- Genres: Ska, Rocksteady, Reggae, Dub
- Occupations: Singer, songwriter, record producer
- Instrument: Vocals
- Years active: 1960–2024
- Labels: Metronome Music / Soul Beat Records

Harris Lloyd "B. B." Seaton (3 September 1944 – 4 March 2024), also known as "Bibby", was a Jamaican reggae singer, songwriter, and record producer who was a member of The Gaylads, Land Wood And Water, The Astronauts, Conscious Minds, and The Messengers (along with Ken Boothe, Lloyd Charmers and Busty Brown), and who had a long solo career dating back to 1960.

== Biography ==
Born in Kingston, Jamaica, Seaton first recorded as a solo artist in 1960 before forming the duo Winston & Bibby with Winston Delano Stewart. The duo were joined by Maurice Roberts and became The Gaylads, although Seaton soon left to join The Astronauts. Seaton rejoined The Gaylads towards the end of the ska era, and they became hugely successful in Jamaica, and their success continued when they were reduced to a duo after Stewart departed. Seaton left in 1972 and restarted his solo career, having several solo hits the same year with "Accept My Apology", "Sweet Caroline", "Lean on Me", and "Thin Line Between Love and Hate".

Seaton's work as a songwriter included songs for Boothe ("The Girl I Left Behind" and "Freedom Street"), The Melodians ("Swing and Dine"), and Delroy Wilson ("Give Love a Try").

Seaton was the first reggae artist to be signed by Virgin Records, leading to the creation of the Front Line label. He became based in the United Kingdom in the mid-1970s where he became active as a producer, his productions including the Gun Court Dub series of dub albums.

Seaton continued to perform into the 2010s as a member of The Gaylads. He died in London, England on 4 March 2024, at the age of 79.

== Discography ==
=== Albums ===
- The Great Ken Boothe Meets BB Seaton & The Gaylads (1971), Jaguar – Ken Boothe, B. B. Seaton, and The Gaylads
  - includes "You Can't Get Away" which was featured on episode 2 of the 2023 series Funny Woman set in 1960s London
- Thin Line Between Love and Hate (1973), Trojan
- Dancing Shoes (1974), Virgin
- Gun Court Dub ( 1975), Soul Beat
- Revolutionary Dub ( 1976 ) Treasure Isle
- Colour is not the Answer (1976), Jama
- I'm Aware of Love (1979), Roots Music International
- B.B. Seaton Sings the Golden Hits of the Gaylads (1981), Ayana
- Everyday People (1985), Revue/Creole
- Wish Me Luck (1989), Challenge Records UK
- Just One Moment (1993), Soul Beat
- In Control (1995), Soul Beat
- Experienced Lover (1996), Soul Beat
- Gun Court Dub Vol 2 ( 1996 ) Soul Beat
- Gun Court Dub Vol. 3 ( 1998)
- Gun Court Dub Vol. 4 ( 2001)
- Unbeaten (2002)
- Reggae Land (2006)
- Ready for the World (2009)
- I Love Reggae (2013)
- Reggae Country Classics Volume One (Pioneer International)

=== Compilations ===
- Greatest Hits (1996), Rhino
- Rootically Yours (2000), Soul Beat
- Seal of Approval (2003), Soul Beat – B. B. Seaton & The Gaylads
- After All This Time: The Anthology 1972–1989 (2007), Soul Beat

=== Productions ===
- Gun Court Dub (1975), Love
- Revolutionary Dub (1976), Trenchtown
- Gun Court Dub vol. 2 (1994), Soul Beat
- Gun Court Dub vol. 3 (1996), Soul Beat
- Gun Court Dub vol. 4 (2001), Soul Beat
