= Bongo Herman =

- Also known as: Herman Constantine Davis
- Born: 16 September 1944 (age 81)
- Origin: Kingston, Jamaica
- Genres: Reggae
- Instruments: Drums, percussion
- Years active: early 1960s–present

Herman Constantine Davis (born 16 September 1944), better known as Bongo Herman, is a Jamaican hand-drummer, percussionist and singer who has had a successful career stretching back to the early 1960s.

== Biography ==
Herman Davis was born on 16 September 1944, and grew up in the Trench Town area of Kingston. He began playing in the late 1950s, and in the 1960s performed on the Vere Johns Opportunity Hour, and in Kingston's live music scene. In 1966 he performed at the visit to Jamaica of Haile Selassie. Herman's recording career began in 1969. He recorded as a duo with Eric "Bingy Bunny" Lamont in the early 1970s for producer Derrick Harriott, having hits in Jamaica including "Know For I" in 1971. He moved on to record for Harry Mudie in the mid-1970s. In the 1970s and 1980s he was much in demand as a studio musician, recording with The Abyssinians (including kété drums on "Satta Masa Gana"), Jimmy Cliff, Prince Far I, the Congos, Culture, the Revolutionaries, Roots Radics, and Mikey Dread. He acted as percussionist for The Itals for several years.

He made an acting appearance in the 1978 film Rockers, of which he commented "Me was the first man in Jamaica to break-dance in a movie". He also features in the 2009 documentary Rock Steady the Roots of Reggae.

During the 1990s he continued to work with many of Jamaica's top stars including Beenie Man, Capleton (with whom he toured Europe in 2003/4), Sizzla, Lady Saw, and U-Roy, and in the 2000s recorded with Mutabaruka and Gyptian. The digital era proved no barrier, with Herman stating "Once yuh is a professional musician yuh will fit inna anything, even a steel band; yuh have various type a percussion fi play, yuh jus' have fi know how to mix it inna di rhythm."

His live performances often include the playing of a chamber pot and an enamel chimney.

== Discography ==
=== Albums ===
- Bongo Herman: Master Drummer (2007)
- Bongo Herman Meet The Roots Man Vibration/Various, Roots Man
- Sound Clash of the 21st Century - Bongo Herman Meets Downbeat & Caveman Sounds

=== Singles ===
- "Dr. Who" (1969), Explosion - Bongo Herman & Les Chen, featured on 2007 compilation Essential Ska
- "Know For I" (1971) - Bongo Herman and Eric "Bingy Bunny" Lamont
- "Orthodox Rock" (1974), Cactus
- "Let Them Try" (1975), Impact
- "Chairman of the Board" (1984), Harry J
- "Liquidator" (1984), Harry J
- "Great Stone", Ire Hi-Fi
- "Heat of the Battle", Massive B
- "Satta Don", Clinch
- "Wisdom", Clinch
