= The Gaylads =

Jamaican vocal group

- Origin: Jamaica
- Genres: Rocksteady, reggae
- Years active: 1963–present
- Labels: Studio One, Beverley's, Trojan, Ballistic
- Members: Harold Davis; Dennis Spencer
- Past members: Austin Robert Poe; Ricky Grant; Maurice Roberts (deceased); Harris "B.B." Seaton (deceased); Hopeton Thaxter; Randall Thaxter

The Gaylads are a Jamaican vocal group. They were one of the top rocksteady vocal groups active in Jamaica between 1963 and 1973.

== History ==
The group, formed in Kingston, originally consisted of singers Harris "B.B." Seaton, Winston Delano Stewart and Maurice Roberts; Seaton and Stewart had previously been successful as the duo Winston & Bibby. There would be several line-up changes throughout The Gaylads' ten-year history, with Maurice Roberts remaining the only constant member.

The Gaylads went on hiatus in 1964, with Seaton performing solo on the cabaret circuit, but they reformed in 1966. The group's early successes were with producer Clement "Coxsone" Dodd at Studio One, and included "Lady in the Red Dress", "Stop Making Love", "You Should Never Do That", and "Don't Say No". Besides recording several hit records, The Gaylads also backed many influential musicians (including Ken Parker, Ken Boothe, and Delroy Wilson) on recordings. In 1968 they moved on to record for Sonia Pottinger and enjoyed further hit singles. They recorded for Leslie Kong in 1969, including the hit single "There's a Fire". Stewart left the group when he emigrated, and Kong's death dealt them a further blow, but they had further success recording for Rupie Edwards in the early 1970s. Seaton also emigrated, leaving Roberts as the only original member.

Roberts, the remaining original member, selected brothers Randell and Hopeton Thaxter to carry on the Gaylads name; the new lineup never matched the success of its predecessor, however, and after releasing the album, Love and Understanding, as the Gayladds, Roberts dropped any reference to the moniker and rechristened the trio the Psalms, landing as backing vocalists for Bunny Wailer. The founding duo of Seaton and Stewart reformed for the first time in over two decades for an appearance at the 1991 Studio One concert, and two years later Roberts joined them for a performance at the Rocksteady Reunion in Kingston. Seaton, who began his solo career in 1973 with the album Thin Line Between Love and Hate and enjoyed success throughout the years to follow—subsequently relocated to London to helm his revived Soul Beat imprint.

Some of their hits included one of the first singles encouraging repatriation - "Africa (We Want To Go)," "Joy In The Morning"; "Red Rose," (for Coxsone Dodd at Studio One), "It's Hard To Confess," "Over the Rainbow's End" (for Sonia Pottinger) and "My Jamaican Girl" (for Leslie Kong / Beverley's).

In 2012, the line-up of the Gaylads comprised Seaton and Randall Thaxter. By 2016 the group comprised Seaton, Harold Davis, and Dennis Spencer.

Maurice Roberts died on 14 August 2015, at the age of 70. B. B. Seaton died on 4 March 2024, at the age of 79.

== Discography ==
=== Albums ===
- Soul Beat (1967), Studio One
- Fire & Rain (1970), Beverley's
- Understanding (1979), United Artists/Ballistic
- Cornell Campbell Meets The Gaylads (with Sly and Robbie) (1984), Culture Press - split with Cornell Campbell

As the Psalms

- Up Front (1992), Solomonic

=== Compilation albums ===
- Seal of Approval, Soul Beat - B.B. Seaton and the Gaylads
- After Studio One (1992), Metro
- Over the Rainbow's End (Best of The Gaylads) 1968-1971 (1995), Trojan
- Ska Days, Studio One
