= Longlife =

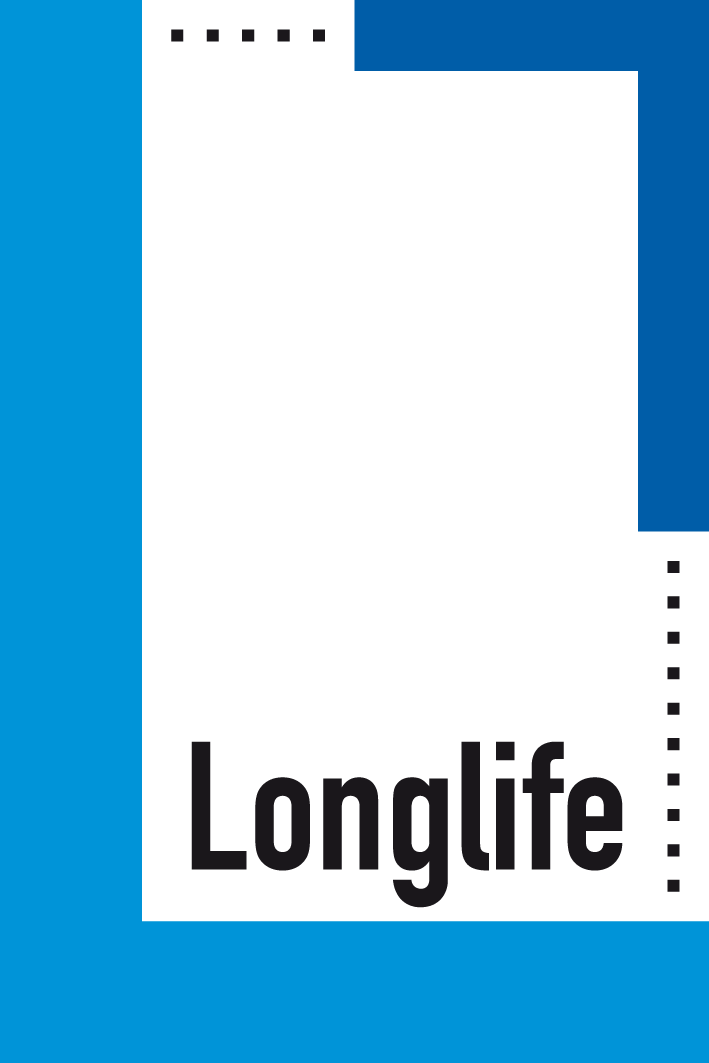
Logo of the project Longlife

Longlife (Longlife - Sustainable, energy efficient residential buildings in regard to European requirements and innovative technologies in the Baltic Sea Region) is a transnational project in the Baltic Region. It is funded through the EU programme Baltic Sea Region 2007-2013. Longlife contributes to the EU Strategy 2020 framework to reduce energy consumption.

== Longlife project ==
Longlife is developing standards for sustainable, energy efficient building in the Baltic Region and harmonizing the different construction technologies. This includes standards for sustainability, procedures for planning, building permits and tendering and funding in the Baltic Region. One of the goals is to make the Baltic Region more competitive.

In the Longlife project partners from Denmark, Lithuania, Poland, Russia and Germany are working together. Lead Partner is the TU Berlin, Institute of Architecture, Chair of Design and Structure, Prof. Dr.-Ing. Klaus Rückert. The developed standards and benchmarks are minimum requirements for sustainable buildings. Considerations are made concerning the ecological, economic and social aspects in the life cycle of a building. The design process is supported by the Longlife prototype, a catalogue of materials, components and key technologies for energy efficiency and renewable energy sources that meet the minimum requirements of Longlife, e.g. the final energy consumption of 40kWh / m² year.

Longlife will demonstrate with Pilot projects that an extra effort in the integrated planning in order to minimize energy consumption and operating costs of a building life cycle is worthwhile.

At the end of the planning process, the building will be certified with the Longlife Performance Pass. This performance pass includes measurable data from the building in the fields of energy, costs and qualities. The practical solutions and innovative technologies are also applicable to other building types. Together with seven other projects Longlife will develop in 2012 a compendium which shows the potential and synergy of an energy cluster.

As a continuation of the project's work, the Longlife Institute e.V. was founded in September 2011.
