= Sons of Jah =

Jamaican reggae band

- Origin: Trenchtown, Jamaica
- Genres: Reggae, roots rockers, rocksteady
- Years active: 1976–1993
- Labels: Natty Congo
- Past members: Trevor Bow, Derrick Donaldson, Bunny MacKenzie, Deego Reuben, Howard Haughton

Sons of Jah were a Jamaican reggae band. They made at least four records, including the album Bankrupt Morality in 1978, which was co-produced by Mikey Dread.

Sons Of Jah were a vocal trio formed in Trenchtown, Jamaica, in 1976, led by Trevor Bow (born Kingston, Jamaica, and died in Kingston, 1993). Throughout his career Bow worked with a variety of vocalists, including Derrick Donaldson, Bunny MacKenzie, Deego Reuben and Howard Haughton. The group’s debut release, ‘Tell Them Jah Son’, surfaced in the UK through the inauguration of Michael Campbell and King Sounds’ Grove Music collective. Bow recorded with Bob Marley and the Wailers at Tuff Gong Studios, assisted by the drum and bass duo of Carlton 'Carly' Barrett and Aston "Family Man" Barrett.

By 1978 Bow had set up his own Natty Congo label, releasing Bankrupt Morality alongside the singles Psalm 72, which proved a big hit on night-time radio, as well as their release Israel Woman. His Natty Congo label was intended solely for Sons Of Jah releases, although he released some Errol Dunkley material. The group were well known for performing in the militant, seditionary and revolutionary roots rockers' style, and Bow’s passion for rocksteady also resulted in the recording of a medley of Techniques songs.

Although based in Ladbroke Grove, London, the Sons typically recorded in Jamaica. Following Bob Marley’s death in 1981, Bow made a cameo appearance as a cavalryman alongside Aswad and King Sounds in the video for the posthumous release of ‘Buffalo Soldier’.

In 1982 the Sons recorded Breaking Down The Barriers, which demonstrated the group’s crystal-clear harmonies and utilised the same rhythm as Ranking Dread's militant Shut Mi Mouth 12 inch discomix on the Greensleeves label. The Sons built a loyal sound system roots following and the release of Johnny Too Late and Marshall Rock maintained the band’s profile in 1983.

Trevor Bow died in Kingston on April 23, 1993.
