= Livity Africa =

Livity Africa is a non profit organisation with offices in Cape Town and Johannesburg. Launched in 2011, Livity Africa publishes the Live Magazine SA, a nationwide youth‐run media channel that helps springboard young people into full‐time paid employment.

== Description ==
Livity provides vocational, on‐the‐job training in journalism, media, marketing, digital skills and business entrepreneurship, producing content that is of industry standard. The Shuttleworth Foundation supported in establishing Livity Africa in Cape Town.

Young people who serve as interns at Livity Africa help prepare and publish Live Mag SA with the mentorship of employed industry professionals. Interns are recruited in badges, four times a year. These interns serve a 3-month period at Livity Africa of which an issue of the Live Mag SA should be out within the timeframe of the badge of the interns. Currently in production stages is the Live Mag SA issue 10. Livity Africa has over 30 workers at a point in time, most of them being interns. As a developmental agency for the youth, Livity Africa focuses on campaigns and creations to challenge the youth to influence social change.

== History ==
Livity Africa begun in 2011 in Cape Town. It was established by Gavin Weale who is the former Livity UK Associate Director. The Live Mag SA is licensed under Creative Commons, one of the few magazine publishers in South Africa to embrace such flexible content licensing.

Major funding for Livity Africa came from the Shuttleworth Foundation, a South African based social innovation foundation – in the form of a three-year fellowship awarded to Gavin Weale, managing director of Livity Africa.

In May 2014, Livity Africa launched the Digify program in partnership with Google, a digital bootcamp to teach youngsters digital and social media skills. In 2016, Google announced it broadened its partnership with Livity to train 1 million Africans to the digital world over a 12-month period. The operation is mainly leveraged through the website Digify Africa that provides free courses for anyone in Africa.

== Work ==
- Digify Africa: 10-week digital marketing bootcamp. Launched in South Africa in 2014 (and in Nigeria and Kenya in 2016), this network of expert trainers deliver practical learning experiences that lead directly to in-demand jobs in the digital economy, or help launch small enterprises. Digify Africa is delivered in partnership with Google, the Rockefeller Foundation, the British Council and Absa.
- Live Magazine: Nationwide youth-run media channel covering fashion, art, culture, music, politics, lifestyle, relationships, career advice, and events. Its content is produced by a team of 18-25 year olds working closely with professional writers and creatives. Live Magazine funders and sponsors have included the Shuttleworth Foundation, the DG Murray Trust and the British Council, and brand sponsors including Mr Price, Chicken Licken, Pick n Pay, Puma, J&J and Legit.
- VIP campaign: Campaign that encourages young people to vote and become active agents in their democracy. Through digital engagement, interactive events, interventions in parliament, and activations across South Africa in a co-ordinated ongoing campaign, this network of young people not only report on how SA’s democracy functions, but also advocate for youth interests and issues. VIP is delivered with ongoing support from the Omidyar Network, Making All Voices Count, the Raith Foundation and the IndigoTrust.
