= Front Line (record label) =

Record label

- Parent company: Virgin Records
- Founded: 1978
- Founder: Richard Branson
- Status: Defunct
- Genre: Reggae
- Country of origin: UK

Front Line was a reggae subsidiary of Virgin Records established in 1978. Over forty albums were issued on the label before it folded in 1979.

== History ==
Virgin had been releasing reggae records since BB Seaton's "Dancing Shoes" in 1974. By 1975, label owner Richard Branson had begun signing roots reggae artists, and in the three years that followed, Virgin released successful albums by the likes of U-Roy, The Mighty Diamonds, Keith Hudson, Johnny Clarke, Peter Tosh, and I Roy. Johnny Rotten is rumoured to have signed with Virgin because of the company's progressive policy towards reggae. In 1978, Branson decided to form a subsidiary label dedicated wholly to reggae, and called this Front Line.

Branson and Rotten travelled to Kingston and signed artists to the label including Prince Far I, Big Youth, Prince Hammer, Tappa Zukie, Sly Dunbar, and The Twinkle Brothers. Many of the artists who had previously released records on Virgin also moved to the new label. Front Line folded after two years although some of the artists remained signed to Virgin.

Many of the albums were reissued on compact disc in the 2000s.

== Catalogue ==
=== 7-inch singles ===
- FLS 101: I Roy – "Fire Stick" / "Casmas Town" (1978)
- FLS 102: The Gladiators – "Stick a Bush" / "Music Makers from Jamaica" (1978)
- FLS 103: Jah Lloyd the Black Lion – "This Ya Sound" / "Upfull Rastaman" (1978)
- FLS 104: The Twinkle Brothers – "Free Africa" (1978)
- FLS 105: Sly Dunbar – "A Who Say" / "Cocaine Cocaine" (1978)
- FLS 106: Prince Hammer – "Bible" / "Morwell Esquire" (1978)
- FLS 107: Althea & Donna – "Puppy Dog Song" / "Sorry" (1978)
- FLS 108: Joyella Blade – "Cairo" (1978)
- FLS 109: Tappa Zukie – "She Want a Phensic" / "Rastaman Skank" (1978)
- FLS 110: Althea & Donna – "Going to Negril" / "The West" (1978)
- FLS 111: The Gladiators – "Dreadlocks the Time is Now" / "Pocket Money" (1978)
- FLS 112: Prince Far I – "No More War" (1978)
- FLS 113: The Abyssinians – "Hey You" / "This Land is for Everyone" (1978)
- FLS 114: Vivian Weathers – "Hip Hug" (1978)
- FLS 115: Tappa Zukie – "Oh Lord" / "First Street Rock" (1978)
- FLS 116: Culture – "Natty Get Weary" (1978)
- FLS 117: The Twinkle Brothers – "Distant Drums" (1978)
- FLS 118: The Gladiators – "Struggle" / "Parises to the Most High" (1979)
- FLS 119: The Twinkle Brothers – "Keep on Trying" / "Keep on Dubbing" (1979)
- FLS 125: Culture – "International Herb" / "Down in Jamaica" (1979)
- FLS 126: The Gladiators – "Holiday Ride" / "No Disturbance" (1979)

=== 10-inch singles ===
- FBL 3001: Various Artists – "Various" (1978)
- FCL 5001: The Twinkle Brothers – "Love" (1978)

=== 12-inch singles ===
- FLS 11912: The Twinkle Brothers – "Keep on Trying" / "King Pharaoh" (1979)
- FLS 12012: Sly Dunbar – "Rasta Fiesta" / "Dirty Harry" (1979)
- FLS 12112: Gregory Isaacs – "Soon Forward" / Gregory Isaacs & Prince Far I – "Uncle Joe" / "Come Off Mi Toe" (1979)
- FLS 12212: The Mighty Diamonds – "Bodyguard" / "One Brother Short" (1979)
- FLS 12312: The Twinkle Brothers – "Jahoviah" / "Free Africa" (1979)
- FLS 12412: I Roy – "Fire in a Wire" / "Hill and Gully" (1979)

=== 12-inch singles VOLE SERIES ===
- Vole 1: Dr. Alimantado – "Slavery Let it Go" / "Find the One" (1978)
- Vole 2: U-ROY – "Small Axe" / "Small Axe" (1978)
- Vole 4: U-Brown – "Black Star Liner" / "River John Mountain" (1978)
- Vole 5: U-ROY – "Live at the Lyceum" / ".." (1978)
- Vole 6: Sly – "A Who Say" / "Cocaine Cocaine" (1978)
- Vole 7: Althea & Donna – "Going to the Negril" / "The West" (1978)

=== Albums ===
- FL 1001: I Roy – Heart of a Lion (1978)
- FL 1002: The Gladiators – Proverbial Reggae (1978)
- FL 1003: U Brown – Mr. Brown Something (1978)
- FL 1004: Prince Hammer – Bible (1978)
- FL 1005: Jah Lloyd the Black Lion – The Humble One (1978)
- FL 1006: Tappa Zukie – MPLA (1978)
- FL 1008: Sly Dunbar – Simple Sly Man (1978)
- FL 1009: Tappa Zukie – Peace in the Ghetto (1978)
- FL 1010: The Icebreakers with The Diamonds – Planet Mars Dub (1978)
- FL 1011: Big Youth – Isaiah First Prophet of Old (1978)
- FL 1012: Althea & Donna – Uptown Top Ranking (1978)
- FL 1013: Prince Far I – Message from the King (1978)
- FL 1014: Big Youth – Dreadlocks Dread (1978)
- FL 1015: Ranking Trevor – In Fine Style (1978)
- FL 1016: Culture – Harder Than The Rest (1978)
- FL 1017: Poet & the Roots – Dread Beat an' Blood (1978)
- FL 1018: U-Roy – Version Galore (1978)
- FL 1019: The Abyssinians – Arise (1978)
- FL 1020: Gregory Isaacs – Cool Ruler (1978)
- FL 1021: Prince Far I – Long Life (1978)
- FL 1023: U-Roy – Jah Son of Africa (1978)
- FL 1025: Vivian Weathers – Bad Weather (1978)
- FL 1028: I Roy – Ten Commandments (1978)
- FL 1029: Tappa Zukie – In Dub (1978)
- FL 1030: U Brown – Can't Keep a Good Man Down (1978)
- FL 1031: Jah Lloyd – Black Moses (1978)
- FL 1032: Tappa Zukie – Tapper Roots (1978)
- FL 1033: I Roy – World on Fire (1978)
- FL 1034: Various Artists – Hottest Hits (from the vaults of Treasure Island) (1979)
- FL 1035: The Gladiators – Naturality (1979)
- FL 1040: Culture – Cumbolo (1979)
- FL 1041: The Twinkle Brothers – Praise Jah (1979)
- FL 1042: Sly Dunbar – Sly Wicked and Slick (1979)
- FL 1044: Gregory Isaacs – Soon Forward (1979)
- FL 1045: The Mighty Diamonds – Deeper Roots (Back to the Channel) (1979)
- FL 1047: Culture – International Herb (1979)
- FL 1048: The Gladiators – Sweet So Till (1979)
- FLX 4001: I Roy – Cancer (1979)
- FLX 4002: Prince Far I – Cry Tuff Dub Encounter Part 2 (1979)
- FLX 4003: The Twinkle Brothers – Love (1979)
- FLX 4004: U-Roy – With Words of Wisdom (1979)
- FLD 6001: The Mighty Diamonds – Deeper Roots (Back to the Channel) (1979)
- FLD 6002: I Roy – The General /Spider's Web (dub) (1979)
- VS 503: Various Artists – The Front Line (Original sampler album, first released on the Virgin record label) (1976)
- FLB 3001: Various Artists – The Front Line II (Second sampler album) (1978)
- FLB 3002: Various Artists – The Front Line III (Third & final sampler album) (1979)
