= Sam Brown (Rastafari) =

Jamaican Rastafari elder

Ras Sam Brown (16 December 1925 – August 1998) was a Jamaican Rastafari elder.

== About ==
He was well known in Kingston for his politics after he participated in the elections of 1961 with his Suffering People's Party. He received fewer than 100 votes. However, by being the first Rasta to ever stand for politics, his influence has been greater than this statistic suggests. At the time there was a generalised feeling in the Rastafarian faith that they do not vote.

Leonard E. Barrett includes an interview with Brown in his 1977 book The Rastafarians whom he describes as "one of the most complex personalities within the Rastafarian movement". Barrett also provides extracts from Brown's election campaign literature. Barrett refers to Brown's political party as the Black Man's Party rather than The Suffering People' Party, though he also quotes the party's position that all were free to join regardless of colour. Also included in his book is a photograph captioned "rare photograph of a Rastafarian political party symbol", depicting a group of Rastafarians (one of whom may be Brown) standing by a placard advertising Brown's campaign.

In 1996, Brown became a roots reggae singer and poet with an album called History, Past and Present. He died while attending an international trade fair in Barbados in 1998.

== Works ==
He took advantage of his influence within the movement to give 21 principles to Rastafari which can be summarized in 10, as he himself said in Treatise on the Rastafarian Movement, Caribbean Studies 1966, Vol. 6,1:40 :

"The Rastafarian is he who bow the knee to God (Rastafari) alone. We are those who obey strict moral and divine laws, based on the Mosaic tenet:

(1) We strongly object to sharp implements used in the desecration of the figure of Man, e. g., trimming and shaving, tattooing of the skin, cuttings of the flesh.

(2) We are basically vegetarians, making scant use of certain animal flesh yet outlawing the use of swine's flesh in any form, shell fishes, scaleless fishes, snails, etc.

(3) We worship and observe no other God but Rastafari, outlawing all other forms of Pagan worship yet respecting all believers.

(4) We love and respect the brotherhood of mankind, yet our first love is to the sons of Ham.

(5) We disapprove and abhor utterly hate, jealousy, envy, deceit, guile, treachery, etc.

(6) We do not agree to the pleasures of present-day society and its modern evils.

(7) We are avowed to create a world order of one brotherhood.

(8 ) Our duty is to extend the hand of charity to any brother in distress, firstly for he is of the Rastafari order - secondly to any human, animals, plants, etc., likewise.

(9) We do adhere to the ancient laws of Ethiopia.

(10) Thou shall give no thought to the aid, titles and possessions that the enemy in his fear may seek to bestow on you; resolution to your purpose is the love of Rastafari."

<<Throughout every nation of the world today you find Rasta. In every kind of color, in every kind of race you find Rastafarians, "black", "white", "yellow", "red" and all shades in between.>> - Ras Sam Brown
