= Culture (band) =

Jamaican roots reggae band

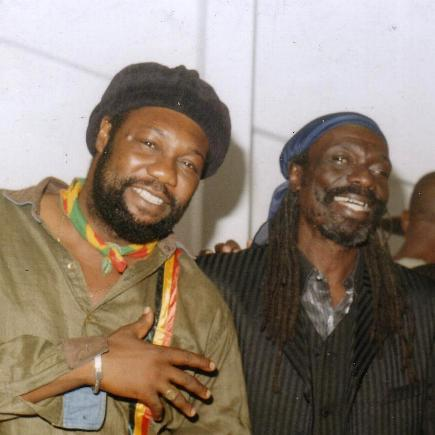
- Waipa Saberty and Joseph Hill

Background information
- Origin: Kingston, Jamaica
- Genres: Roots reggae, dub
- Years active: 1976–present
- Labels: Joe Gibbs Music, High Note, Virgin/Front Line, Blue Mountain, Shanachie, RAS, VP, Heartbeat
- Members: Kenyatta Hill; Albert Walker; Telford Nelson
- Past members: Joseph Hill; Roy "Kenneth" Dayes (aka Kenneth Paley); Reginald Taylor

Culture are a Jamaican roots reggae group founded in 1976. Originally they were known as the African Disciples. The one constant member until his death in 2006 was Joseph Hill.

== History ==
The group formed in 1976 as the vocal trio of Joseph Hill (formerly a percussionist in Studio One house band the Soul Defenders), his cousin Albert "Ralph" Walker, and Roy "Kenneth" Dayes, initially using the name The African Disciples. Roy Dayes also used the name "Kenneth Paley", which is the name that appears on the Culture records released by Virgin Records. The African Disciples soon changed their name to Culture, and auditioned successfully for the "Mighty Two": producer Joe Gibbs and engineer Errol Thompson. While at Gibbs' studio, they recorded a series of singles, starting with "See Dem a Come" and including "Two Sevens Clash", many of which appeared on their debut album Two Sevens Clash. The song drew on apocalyptic interpretations of the number seven associated with some Rastafarian beliefs, predicting the end of the world in 1977. The song was sufficiently influential that many in Kingston stayed indoors on 7 July 1977, fearing that the prophecy would come true. A second Gibbs-produced album, Baldhead Bridge, followed in 1978, by which time the group had moved on to record for producer Sonia Pottinger. The group entered into a long-running dispute with Gibbs over royalties to the first album.

Two Sevens Clash meanwhile had become a big seller in the United Kingdom, popular with punk rock fans as well as reggae fans and boosted by the support of John Peel on his BBC Radio 1 show, and reached number 60 on the UK Albums Chart in April 1978. This prompted Virgin Records to sign the group to its Front Line label, releasing Harder than the Rest (1978) and International Herb (1979). Culture also released records on other labels in Jamaica, including a dub version of Harder than the Rest, Culture in Dub (1978, High Note), and an album of different recordings of the same album, Africa Stand Alone (April 1978). An album recorded for Pottinger in 1979 with a working title of Black Rose remained unreleased until tracks emerged in 1993 on Trod On.

Culture performed at the One Love Peace Concert in 1978.

In 1981 the three singers went their own ways. Hill carried on using the Culture name, and recorded the Lion Rock album, which was reissued in the United States by Heartbeat Records. Hill and his new band recorded a session for long time supporter John Peel in December 1982, and the group went on to record further studio sessions for Peel in 1998 and 2002, and their performance at the Royal Festival Hall in July 1998 was broadcast on his show. For their part, Walker and Dayes recorded a handful of songs on their own; a few of which turned up on an album titled Roots & Culture. Hill performed at the Reggae Sunsplash festival in 1985 and in 1986 the original line-up reformed to record two highly regarded albums – Culture in Culture and Culture at Work.

Several albums followed in the 1990s on Shanachie Records and Ras Records, often recorded with Sly and Robbie, with Dayes leaving the group again around 1994, with Reginald Taylor replacing him. Dayes subsequently worked as a solo artist under the name Kenneth Culture.

By 2001 Telford Nelson had replaced Taylor.

Joseph Hill, who came to symbolise the face of Culture, died in Berlin, Germany on 19 August 2006 while the group was on tour, after collapsing following a performance. His son, Kenyatta Hill, who had acted as the group's sound engineer on tour, performed with his father's band at the Western Consciousness show in 2007, which was dedicated to Joseph Hill, and became the lead singer of Culture; Walker and Nelson continue to provide backing vocals.

In 2011, Live On was released, featuring Kenyatta's performances of his father's songs, including "Two Sevens Clash" and "International Herb".

== Discography ==
=== Studio albums ===
- Two Sevens Clash (1977), Joe Gibbs Music
- Baldhead Bridge (1978), Joe Gibbs Music
- Harder than the Rest produced by Sonia Pottinger (1978), Virgin Records/Front Line
- Africa Stand Alone (1978), April
- Cumbolo produced by Sonia Pottinger (1979), Virgin/Front Line
- International Herb produced by Sonia Pottinger (1979), High Note/Virgin
- More Culture aka Innocent Blood (1981), Joe Gibbs Music
- Lion Rock (1982), Sonic Sounds
- Culture in Culture (1985), Music Track
- Culture at Work (1986), Blue Mountain/Shanachie
- Nuff Crisis! (1988), Blue Mountain
- Good Things (1989), RAS
- Three Sides to My Story (1991), Shanachie
- Wings of a Dove (1992), Shanachie
- One Stone (1996), Gorgon/RAS
- Trust Me (1997), RAS
- Payday (1999), RAS
- Humble African (2000), VP
- World Peace (2003), Heartbeat
- Pass the Torch (Tafari Records) (2007) (Seven versions of old tunes by Joseph Hill, and seven tunes by his son Kenyatta Hill)
- Live On (2011), Zojak Worldwide

=== Dub albums ===
- Culture Dub (1978), High Note
- Culture in Dub: 15 Dub Shots (1994), Heartbeat
- Stoned (One Stone in Dub engineered by Fathead and Jim Fox) (1996), RAS
- Scientist Dubs Culture into a Parallel Universe (2000)
- Rare and Unreleased Dub, Revolver

=== Live albums ===
- Cultural Livity: Live Culture '98 (1998), RAS
- Live in Africa (2002)
- Live in Negril (2003)

=== Split albums ===
- Roots and Culture (1982), Jah Guidance – split with Don Carlos

=== Compilations ===
- Vital Selection (1981), Virgin
- Rare and Unreleased Dub Revolver Records (1989)
- Too Long in Slavery produced by Sonia Pottinger (1981), Virgin
- 17 Chapters of Culture (1992), Sonic Sounds
- Trod On produced by Sonia Pottinger (1993), Heartbeat
- Strictly Culture: The Best Of Culture 1977–1979 (1994), MCI
- Ras Portraits (1997), RAS
- Peace and Love (1997), Rhino
- Reggae Giants (1997), Top Tape
- Production Something (1998), Heartbeat
- Kings of Reggae (2001), Nocturne
- Chanting On (2004), Earmark
- This Is Crucial Reggae (2004), Sanctuary
- Culture & The Deejays at Joe Gibbs 1977–79 (2008), 17 North Parade
- At Joe Gibbs (2011), 17 North Parade
- Seven Sevens Clash (2012), 17 North Parade – box set of seven 7-inch singles
- Stronger than Ever: At Their Best, Rocky One
- Natty Never Get Weary, Revolver

=== DVDs ===
- Live in Africa (2002), RAS
