= Umkhonto we Sizwe (Spear of the Nation) =

Studio album by Prince Far I
- Released: 1984
- Recorded: Channel One Studios, Kingston, Jamaica
- Genre: Reggae
- Label: Tamoki Wambesi
- Producer: Roy Cousins

Professional ratings
Review scores
| Source | Rating |
|---|---|
| The Encyclopedia of Popular Music | 3/5 stars |

Umkhonto we Sizwe (Spear of the Nation) is a reggae album by Prince Far I, released in 1984 and which he was recording when he was murdered in 1983. The album is named in honor of the fight of the struggle of the militant wing of the ANC.

The album was engineered by Overton "Scientist" Brown and Sylvan Morris. Backing vocals were by Jah Lloyd, Winston Jarrett and The Viceroys.

== Track listing ==
All tracks composed by Michael Williams and Roy Cousins

1. "Survival"
1. "Survival Version"
2. "Ask Ask"
3. "Ask Ask Version"
4. "African Queen"
5. "African Queen Version"
6. "Stop the War"
7. "Stop the War Version"
8. "Jerry Doghead"
9. "Jerry Doghead Version"
10. "Special Request"
11. "Special Request Version"
