= Joseph Hill (musician) =

Jamaican singer and songwriter

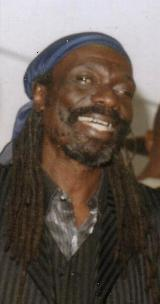
- Joseph Hill in 2000

Background information
- Also known as: Keeper of Zion Gate & Gran' Pa Culture
- Born: 22 January 1949; Linstead, St Catherine, Jamaica
- Died: 19 August 2006 (aged 57) Berlin, Germany
- Genres: Roots reggae
- Years active: Late 1960s–2006

Joseph Hill (22 January 1949 – 19 August 2006) was the lead singer and songwriter for the roots reggae group Culture, most famous for their 1977 hit "Two Sevens Clash", but also well known for their "International Herb" single. Hill recorded 22 albums.

== Biography ==
=== Early life and career ===
Joseph Hill was born in 1949 in Linstead, a town in Saint Catherine Parish in the southeast of Jamaica. He was raised in a Christian family and began singing in church at the age of six. Within two years he was making his own musical instruments. After leaving home he came into contact with Rastafarians and adopted the faith.

He began his career in the late 1960s as a percussionist, recording with the Studio One house band the Soul Defenders. He also worked as a sound system deejay, and began performing as a backing vocalist, leading to his singles "Behold the Land" and "Take Me Girl" in the early 1970s. In the early 70s Hill performed with two groups that included future reggae star Glen Washington: C35 Incorporated and Stepping Stone. He performed regularly on the hotel circuit, but had his greatest success with the group Culture.

=== Culture ===
Hill formed Culture in 1976, and had early success with the prophetic "Two Sevens Clash", predicting apocalypse on 7 July 1977. The record was hugely popular on the emerging punk rock scene in England, heavily influencing The Clash, John Lydon and Public Image.

During the 1970s the group had a string of highly successful singles for producers Joe Gibbs and Sonia Pottinger including the song "Two Sevens Clash" which made its mark on both Jamaica and the United Kingdom. It was named by Rolling Stone magazine in 2002 as one of the "50 Coolest Records", the only single artist reggae album to make the list. The group also had a hit with "Stop Fussing and Fighting", a song that addressed the chaotic political climate of the late 1970s and the attempt on Bob Marley's life.

Joseph Hill and Culture developed a reputation as a performing group after a performance at the One Love Peace Concert in 1978, and was soon regularly touring the United States, Europe and Africa. In recent years the group continued to perform at least one hundred concerts each year, with Hill's wife Pauline as road manager. Hill was a presence on stage: part DJ as he directed his band to reconfigure songs on stage and part teacher as he commented on Jamaican history and current political issues. In his lyrics, Hill often explored how the legacy of slavery continued to have an influence on Jamaican citizens.

Hill had received a number of honours; an induction into the Jamaican Reggae Walk of Fame and a 2005 Independence Award presented by the Prime Minister of Jamaica. In 2005 he received the Culture Shock Bronze Medal in recognition of his contribution to Jamaican music.

As a member of the Rastafari movement, Joseph Hill was a worshipper of emperor Haile Selassie I of Ethiopia. Indeed, Hill's honorific/nickname, "Keeper of Zion Gate" reflects his position as one of reggae's and Rastafari's greatest voices.

=== Death ===
Joseph Hill died on a tour, after collapsing on stage in Berlin, Germany, before Culture entered the Berlin tour on 19 August 2006. At his funeral in September 2006, Hill was eulogised by, amongst others, Jamaican Prime Minister Portia Simpson Miller who recognised his contributions to Jamaican culture.

His son Kenyatta subsequently took over his role in Culture.

== Solo discography ==
=== Singles ===
- "Behold the Land" (1972), Coxsone
- "Take Me Girl" (197?)
- "African King 2"
- "Disobedient Children"
- "The Rastaman"
- "Cousin Rude Boy"
- "Crack in a New York" (1987)
- "Police Man" (2005)
- Raw Truth EP (2006), Ababa Janhoy – featuring Big Youth and Daddy Rings
