= Prince Far I =

Jamaican reggae deejay and record producer

- Also known as: King Cry Cry
- Born: Michael James Williams; 23 March 1945; Spanish Town, Jamaica
- Origin: Kingston, Jamaica
- Died: 15 September 1983 (aged 38) Kingston, Jamaica
- Genre: Reggae
- Occupations: DJ, producer
- Instrument: Vocals

Prince Far I (23 March 1945 – 15 September 1983) was a Jamaican reggae deejay and producer, and a Rastafarian. He was known for his gruff voice and critical assessment of the Jamaican government.

== Biography ==
He was born Michael James Williams in Spanish Town, Jamaica. Williams' first job in the music industry was as a deejay on the Sir Mike the Musical Dragon sound system, also working as a security guard at Joe Gibbs' studio, and later as a bouncer at Studio One, but after recording "The Great Booga Wooga" for Bunny Lee in 1969 (under the name King Cry Cry, a reference to his habit of breaking into tears when angered), he got the chance in 1970 to record for Coxsone Dodd when King Stitt failed to turn up for a session. Dodd was sufficiently impressed to release the resulting recordings, Williams now using the name Prince Far I at the suggestion of another producer he had worked with, Enos McLeod. With a unique deep bass voice and talking over style, preferring to describe himself as a "chanter" rather than a "toaster", he became a popular reggae musician, styling himself "The Voice of Thunder".

His first album, Psalms For I, featuring the Lord's Prayer and various psalms, was dedicated to the illiterate who could not read the Bible for themselves. He then worked with Joe Gibbs on his second album, Under Heavy Manners. The song "Heavy Manners" addressed a state of emergency declared in Jamaica in response to organised street violence. He was subsequently signed by Virgin Records for its Front Line label. Twelve albums followed between 1978 and 1981, including the highly regarded Cry Tuff Dub Encounter series of dub albums, produced by Williams and released on his Cry Tuff label, and featuring the Roots Radics under the pseudonym The Arabs. Spending an increasing amount of time in England, he also collaborated with UK On-U Sound Records including providing vocals in the reggae collective Singers & Players and may be considered a mentor figure to Adrian Sherwood. His final live performance took place on 7 December 1982 at Band on the Wall, Manchester, where he performed with Suns of Arqa This performance is captured on his album Musical Revue. In 1983, he provided vocals on Suns of Arqa's second LP Wadada Magic, and many of these vocals have been reused by the band repeatedly on a variety of tracks and remixes, ranging from their first album in 1980 to (so far) 2006. He is credited for vocals on the sleeve of each of the releases in question.

Later that year he recorded the album Umkhonto We Sizwe with producer Roy Cousins in Kingston. Before the album was finished he was shot at his home in Kingston, Jamaica, during a robbery, allegedly relating to a dispute over money, and died later in hospital.

Adrian Sherwood, deeply upset by the murder of his friend, took a production hiatus from his beloved reggae genre and in 1983 recorded with his group Circut and Neneh Cherry, "Dead Come Alive". Prince Far I is also referenced in the single "Clash City Rockers" by The Clash, and in the song "Sept. 15 1983" by The Mountain Goats, the title of which is the date of his death.

== Discography ==
=== Albums ===
- Psalms for I (Carib Gems, 1975)
- Under Heavy Manners (Joe Gibbs, 1976)
- Message from the King (Virgin Front Line 1978)
- Long Life (Virgin Front Line, 1978)
- Cry Tuff Dub Encounter Chapter 1 (Cry Tuff/Hit Run, 1978)
- Cry Tuff Dub Encounter Part 2 (Cry Tuff/Virgin Front Line, 1979)
- Free from Sin (Trojan, 1979)
- Dub to Africa (Price Far I, 1979)
- Jamaican Heroes (Trojan 1980)
- Cry Tuff Dub Encounter Chapter 3 (Cry Tuff/Daddy Kool, 1980)
- Showcase in a Suitcase (Pre, 1980)
- Livity (Pre, 1981)
- Voice of Thunder (Trojan 1981)
- Cry Tuff Dub Encounter Chapter 4 (Cry Tuff/Trojan 1981)
- Musical History (Trojan 1983)
- Umkhonto We Sizwe (Kingdom/Tamoki Wambesi 1984)
- Musical Revue / Suns of Arqa Live with Prince Far I (ROIR, 1988)
- Health and Strength (Pressure Sounds, 1998)

=== Compilation albums ===
- Black Man Land (1990)
- Dubwise (1991)
- Cry Freedom Dub (1994)
- In the House of Vocal & Dub with King Tubby (1995)
- DJ Originators Head To Head Volume Two Prince Far I & Trinity (1996)
- Megabit 25, 1922-Dub (1998)
- Ten Commandments (1999)
- The Golden Years 1977–1983 (1999)
- Heavy Manners: Anthology 1977–83 (Trojan 2003)
- Silver & Gold 1973-1979 (Blood and Fire, 2005)
- Cry Tuff Chants on U (On-U Sound Records, 2024)
