= Errol Holt =

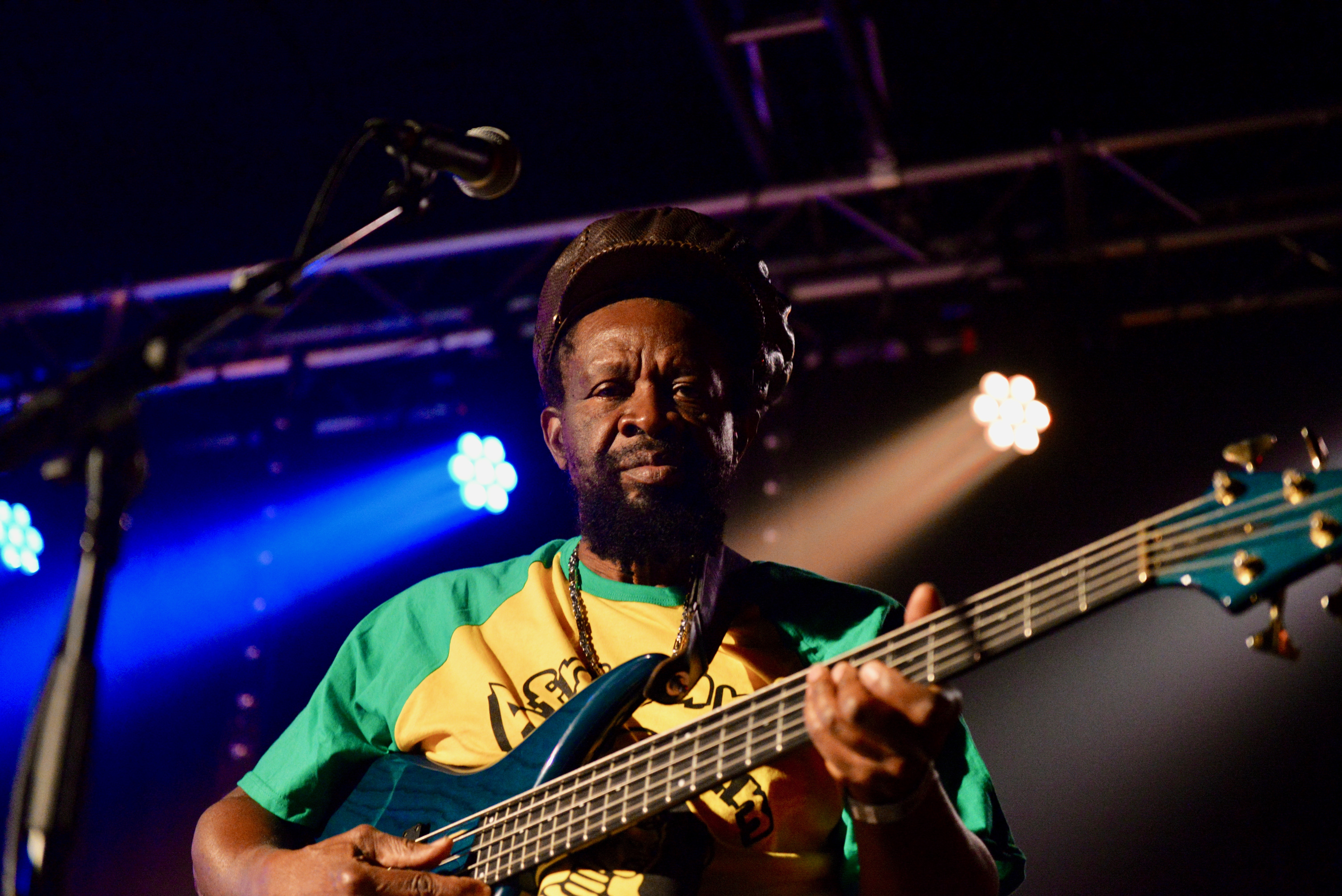
- Errol 'Flabba' Holt in concert in Antwerp in 2018

Background information
- Born: 19 July 1950 (age 75); Kingston, Jamaica
- Genres: Reggae, dancehall
- Instruments: Bass guitar, vocals, guitar, percussion
- Years active: Early 1970s – present

Errol Holt (born 19 July 1950), also known as Errol Carter and by his nickname Flabba, is a Jamaican bass guitar player and a singer who was a member of The Morwells and the Roots Radics and has played on hundreds of Jamaican albums.

== Biography ==
Holt's career began in the early 1970s when he worked as a session musician backing artists including Don Carlos and Prince Far I. He also had a sound system hit in his own name with "A You Lick Me First" in 1976. In 1976 he joined The Morwells, and later formed (along with guitarist Eric "Bingy Bunny" Lamont) the Roots Radics Band, with whom he recorded the backing music for myriad reggae singers and vocal groups in the late 1970s and 80s. In the 1990s he recorded with Israel Vibration, Mikey Dread, Sugar Minott, Mutabaruka, Bunny Wailer, and Yami Bolo. He also worked as a producer, producing records by Jah Stitch, Dennis Brown (Blood Brothers and Milk & Honey), Delroy Wilson (Which Way Is Up), Beres Hammond, and Gregory Isaacs, co-producing Issacs' successful Night Nurse album. He continues to work in-studio with various artists and on tour with Israel Vibration.

== Discography ==
=== Solo albums ===
- Rastafari Time (1975) Sky High
- Vision of Africa (1978) Dread & Dread
- Roots Radics Dub (1981) Tad's
- Nurse in Dub (2001) Naive (Style Scott & Errol Holt)

=== Participated albums ===
- Never Ending by Beres Hammond (2018), VP Records – Bass
- Maroon Songs: Born Free, Live Free, Ever Free (album) by Earl Chinna Smith InnadeYard Binghistra Movement (2022), – Bass
