= Theophilus Beckford =

- Born: 26 June 1935; Trench Town, Kingston, Jamaica
- Origin: Kingston, Jamaica
- Died: 19 February 2001 (aged 65)
- Genres: Calypso, rhythm & blues, ska, reggae
- Instrument: Piano
- Years active: Mid-1950s–2001
- Label: King Pioneer

Theophilus Beckford (26 June 1935 – 19 February 2001) was a Jamaican pianist and one of the pioneers of Jamaican popular music during the transition from rhythm 'n' blues to Jamaican ska.

== Biography ==
Beckford was born in 1935 in Trench Town, Kingston, Jamaica, the second of three sons. He learned to play piano at the Boys' Town home for indigent boys in west Kingston, initially inspired by Rosco Gordon and Fats Domino, and on leaving bought a piano and began working with producer Stanley Motta, backing local calypsonians. His piano playing helped to define the sound and feel of ska music, as distinct from Jamaican rhythm & blues in the late 1950s. He had a huge hit in 1959 with "Easy Snappin", recorded in 1956 and played at dances by producer Coxsone Dodd before he released it three years later on his Worldisc label. The single was a number one in Jamaica and stayed on the chart for eighteen months, also selling well in the United Kingdom, and the emphasis on the off-beat was widely imitated. The song is considered a forerunner of ska. Although Beckford was credited as the writer, he received no royalties from the song. A second hit followed with "Jack & Jill Shuffle", and a few more singles were recorded for Dodd before Beckford formed his own King Pioneer label in the early 1960s.

The bulk of Beckford's recorded work is as a session musician with bands such as Clue J & His Blues Blasters, and he recorded extensively for both Dodd and Duke Reid in this capacity, as well as for Prince Buster, Leslie Kong, and Clancy Eccles.

In 1975, Beckford played piano on Junior Byles' classic song "Fade Away". Regarded by many as Byles’ greatest work, the Discomix "Fade Away" was recorded in 1975 with Earl "Chinna" Smith aka Earl Flute-Melchizedek the High Priest, Carlton "Santa" Davis and Leroy "Horsemouth" Wallace of The Soul Syndicate for producer Joseph Hoo Kim at his Channel One Studios. It was a massive hit in Jamaica and was also a big success in the UK, gaining regular play from Lloyd Coxsone and Jah Shaka sound systems. In 1978 Beckford appeared as himself in the film Rockers.

In 1991, Beckford performed as part of the Studio One The Beat Goes On: 35 years in the Business shows at the National Arena in Kingston.

In 1992, "Easy Snappin'" was used in a television commercial for jeans, but again, Beckford received no royalties. Although he performed on hundreds of popular records, the lack of financial reward received by Beckford was a constant complaint, as he said in 2000: "Today as I listen to music on radio and sound system and recognise that I created some of these tunes. I feel strongly that I am not given full recognition for my work".

Beckford died on 19 February 2001 as a result of injuries sustained from a machete wound to the head after an argument with a neighbour in the Washington Gardens area of Kingston. He left nine children.

== Albums ==
- Trench Town Ska (1999) Jamaican Gold
- Trojan Battlefield: King Pioneer Ska Productions (2004) Trojan
