= Roots Radics =

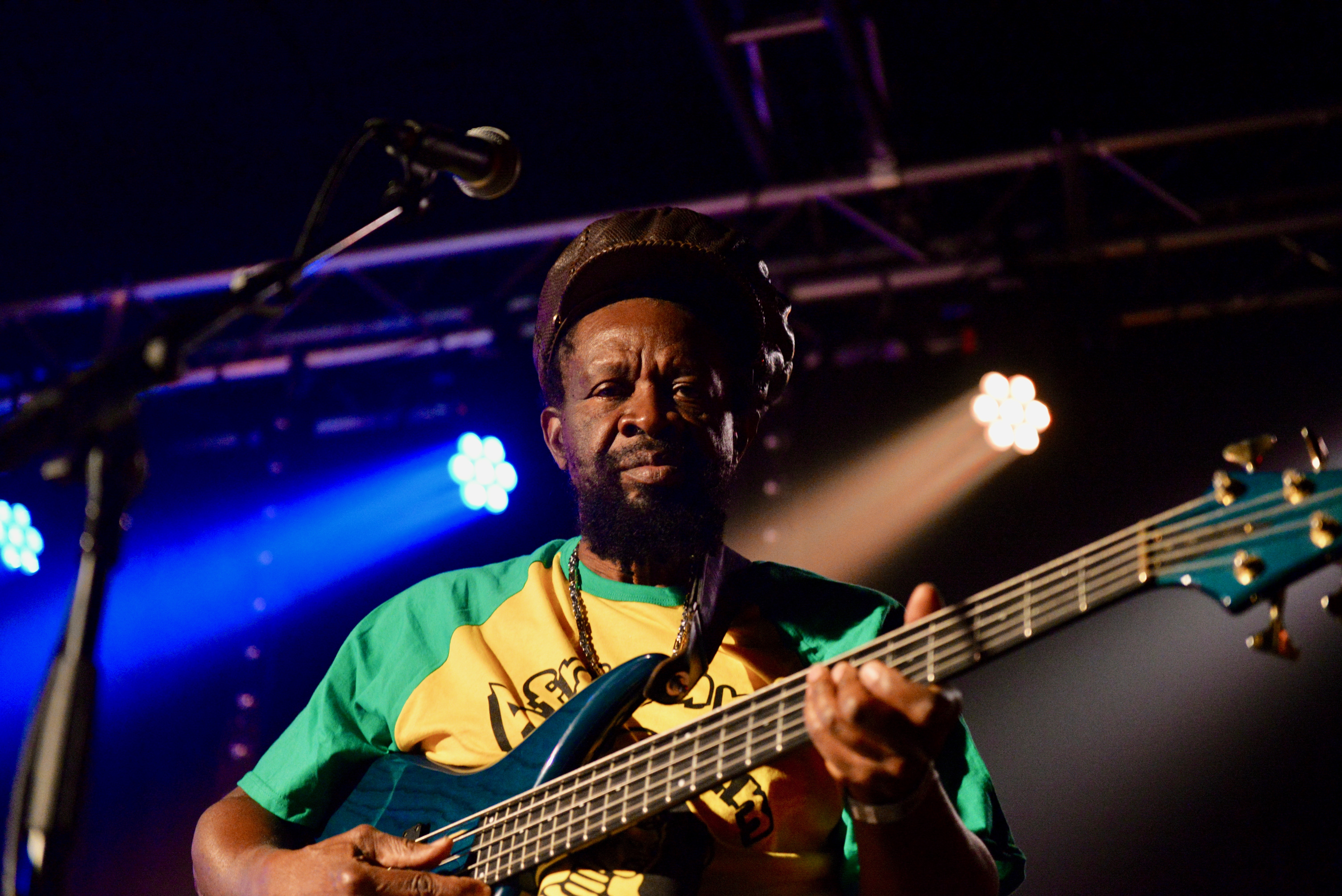

Background information
- Genres: Reggae, Roots Reggae
- Years active: 1978–present
- Labels: VP, Greensleeves, Channel One, Solid Groove

The Roots Radics Band is a Jamaican reggae group, formed in 1978 by bass player Errol "Flabba" Holt, guitarist Eric "Bingy Bunny" Lamont and drummer Lincoln "Style" Scott. The nucleus of Holt and Lamont had previously worked together in the group The Morwells and in the backing band for Prince Far I called The Arabs. They were joined by many musicians, including guitarist Noel "Sowell" Bailey, Dwight Pinkney and Steve Golding, keyboard player Wycliffe "Steelie" Johnson, Pianist Gladstone "Gladdy" Anderson and saxophonist Headley Bennett. As a combined force the Roots Radics became a well-respected studio and stage band, which dominated the sound in the first half of the 1980s. In addition to their own catalogue, they have worked with artists such as Bunny Wailer, Gregory Isaacs, Michael Prophet, Eek-A-Mouse, and Israel Vibration.

In 1979, the band recorded the riddims for Barrington Levy's first songs for producer Henry "Junjo" Lawes, credited at the time as the Channel One Stars.

As a sought after studio lineup, Roots Radics backed several reggae stars in the studio and on tour. For example, they appear on several Eek-A-Mouse albums: Bubble Up Yu Hip (1980), Wa-Do-Dem (1981), Skidip (1982), The Mouse and the Man (1983) and Assassinator (1983). They backed reggae superstar Gregory Isaacs on his album Night Nurse (1982), and are often credited on releases by Prince Far I, both on his solo recording work, and as part of producer Adrian Sherwood's studio supergroup Singers and Players.

Johnson went on to become half of the production duo Steely and Clevie. Lamont died in December 1993 from prostate cancer. Bailey died of cancer in July 2014, aged 61. Lincoln 'Style' Scott was shot dead in his home 9 October 2014.

In 2019 they received their first Grammy nomination for the album The Final Battle: Sly & Robbie vs Roots Radics, a collaboration with Sly & Robbie that was produced by Hernan "Don Camel" Sforzini.

== Discography ==
=== Albums ===
- Dangerous Dub (1981), Greensleeves
- Live at Channel One Kingston Jamaica (1982), Channel One
- Radical Dub Session (1982), Solid Groove
- 12 Inches of Dub (2019), VP Records
- The Final Battle: Sly & Robbie vs Roots Radics (2019), Serious reggae
- The Dub Battle: Sly & Robbie vs Roots Radics (2021), Serious reggae

=== Collaborative albums ===
- Alborosie Meets The Roots Radics – Dub For The Radicals (2019), Greensleeves
