= Eric "Bingy Bunny" Lamont =

Eric Lamont

Background information
- Also known as: Bingy Bunny
- Born: 23 September 1955
- Origin: Kingston, Jamaica
- Died: 31 December 1993 (aged 38)
- Genres: Reggae
- Instrument: Guitar

Eric Norman Lamont (23 September 1955 – 31 December 1993), better known as Bingy Bunny, was a Jamaican guitarist and singer who recorded with the Roots Radics and The Morwells as well as recording solo material. He is regarded as one of Jamaica's most important and innovative guitarists.

== Biography ==
Born in Kingston, Jamaica, Lamont began his career as half of a duo with Bongo Herman, recording "Know Fari" in the early 1970s for producer Derrick Harriott. In 1973 he joined Maurice Wellington in the Morwells, Lamont and Wellington also forming a production team, and at the same he time worked as a session musician. Productions from the duo included Jah Lloyd's Black Lion and Prince Hammer's Bible. When the Morwells disbanded in 1981, Lamont joined up with Lincoln Valentine "Style" Scott and Noel "Sowell" Bailey to form the Roots Radics. The Roots Radics soon became Jamaica's most in-demand session band, working with the likes of Mikey Dread, Gregory Isaacs, Barrington Levy and Bunny Wailer.

Lamont also recorded as a singer while with the Morwells and released two solo albums in 1982, Me & Jane and Bingy Bunny & Morwells as well as a string of singles.

Lamont died in December 1993 from prostate cancer. The album Kingston 12 Toughie (A Tribute To Bingy Bunny) was released by RAS Records in 1996.

== Discography ==
- Me & Jane (1982) Cha Cha
- Bingy Bunny & Morwells (1982) Park Heights
