= List of Jamaican record producers =

This is a list of Jamaican record producers.

== B ==
- B.B. Seaton
- Bob Andy
- Bena Di Senior
- Bobby Digital
- Boris Gardiner
- Bunny Lee
- Byron Lee
- Beenie Man
- Burning spear

== C ==
- Captain Sinbad
- Carl Harvey
- Chris Blackwell
- Clancy Eccles
- Clement S. 'Coxsone' Dodd
- Clive Chin
- Clive Hunt

== D ==
- Danny Ray
- Dave Kelly
- David Madden
- Dean Fraser
- Derrick Harriott
- Demarco
- Dennis Alcapone
- Derrick Morgan
- Devon Russell
- Dobby Dobson
- Donovan Germain
- Dr Alimantado
- Duke Reid

== E ==
- Edward Seaga
- Enos McLeod
- Errol Brown
- Errol Holt
- Errol Thompson
- Etana
- Everton Blender

== F ==
- Freddie McGregor

== G ==
- General Degree
- Geoffrey Chung
- George Phang
- Glen Adams
- Glen Brown
- Gussie Clarke

== H ==
- Harry Johnson (Harry J)
- Harry Mudie
- Henry "Junjo" Lawes
- Herman Chin Loy
- Hyman Wright

== J ==
- Jack Ruby
- Jack Scorpio
- Jah Lloyd
- Jah Screw
- Jah Thomas
- Jah Woosh
- Joe Gibbs
- Jon Baker
- Joseph Hoo Kim
- Junior Reid
- Kamau Preston
- Karl Pitterson
- Keith Hudson
- Ken Lack
- King Jammy
- King Sporty
- King Tubby
- Kurtis Mantronik

== L ==
- Lee "Scratch" Perry
- Leonard Chin
- Leroy Sibbles
- Leroy Smart
- Leslie Kong
- Linval Thompson
- Lloyd Barnes
- Lloyd Charmers
- Lloyd Daley
- Lynford Anderson

== M ==
- Mavado
- Max Romeo
- Mike Brooks
- Mike Beatz
- Mikey Chung

== N ==
- Niney the Observer

== O ==
- Ossie Hibbert

== P ==
- Papa San
- Phil Pratt
- Philip "Fatis" Burrell
- Pluto Shervington
- Prince Buster
- Prince Far I
- Prince Jammy
- Prince Jazzbo
- Prince Philip

== R ==
- Richard Bell
- Richie Stephens
- Robert Ffrench
- Ronnie Nasralla
- Roy Cousins
- Roy Francis
- Rupie Edwards

== S ==
- Scientist
- Serani
- Sonny Roberts
- Steely & Clevie
- Sanchez
- Sean Paul
- Sly & Robbie
- Sonia Pottinger
- Stephen "Di Genius" McGregor
- Steven "Lenky" Marsden
- Sugar Minott
- Supa Dups
- Super Cat
- Sydney Crooks

== T ==
- Tapper Zukie
- Tommy Cowan
- Trinity

== U ==
- Uziah Thompson

== V ==
- Vincent "Randy" Chin
- Vybz Kartel

== W ==
- Wayne Jobson
- Willi Williams
- Winston Riley

== Y ==
- Yabby You

== See also ==
- Category:Jamaican record producers
- Music of Jamaica
- List of Jamaican backing bands
