= Toyan =

Jamaican reggae deejay (1955–1991)

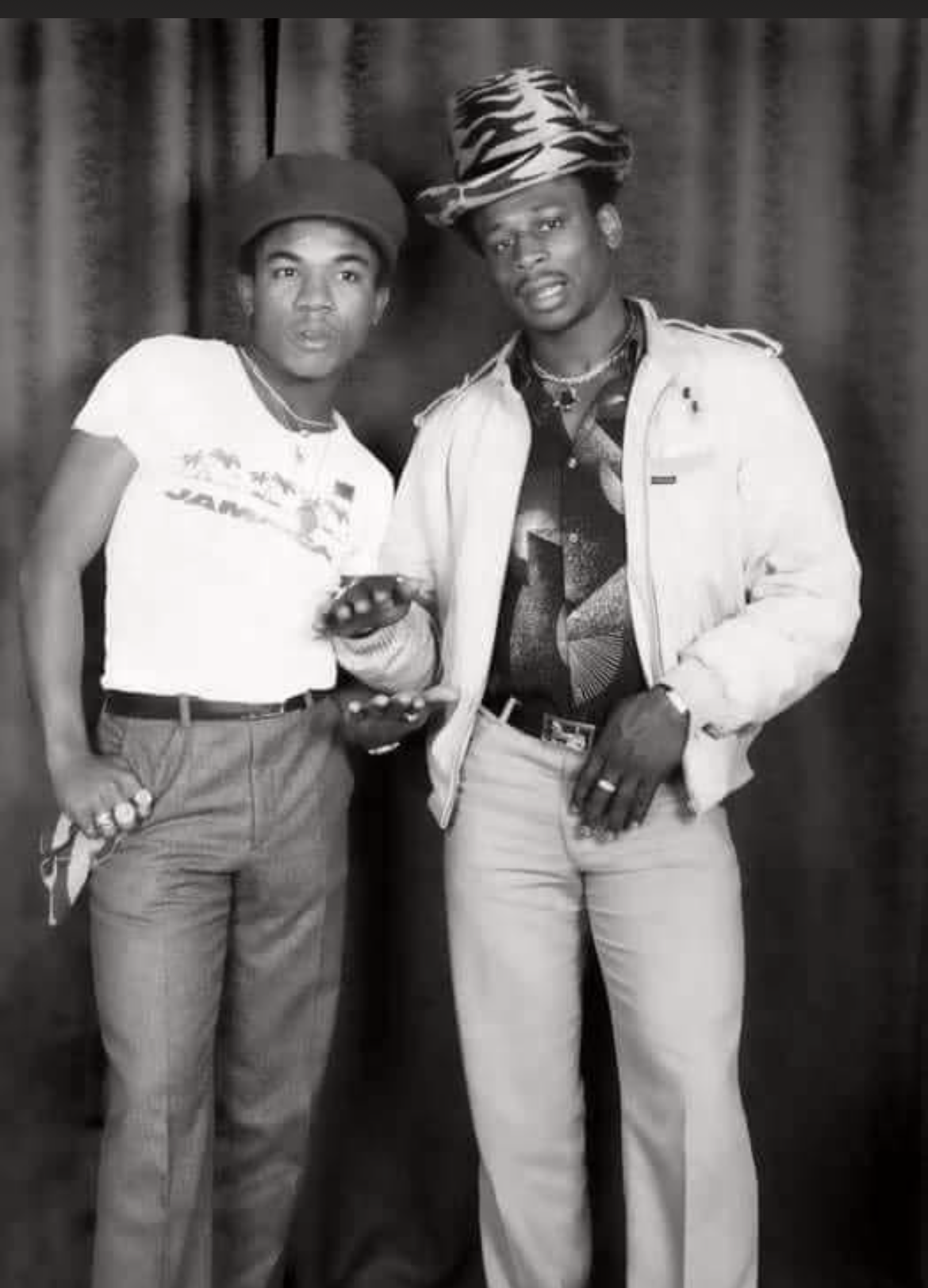
- Ranking Toyan (left) in 1982.

Background information
- Also known as: Ranking Toyan, Papa Toyan
- Born: Byron Everton Letts; 1955
- Origin: Kingston, Jamaica
- Died: 1991 (aged 35–36)
- Genres: Reggae
- Occupation: Artist
- Instrument: Vocals
- Years active: 1974–1991

Toyan aka Ranking Toyan (born Byron Everton Letts, died 1991) was a Jamaican reggae deejay active since the mid-1970s and best known for his early 1980s recordings.

== Biography ==
Toyan began his career in 1974, deejaying on Kingston's sound systems, such as Socialist Roots and Romantic HiFi. He recorded his debut single, "Disco Pants" in the late 1970s for producer Don Mais. He went on to work extensively with Joseph Hoo Kim and Jah Thomas, resulting in a string of hits including "Girls Nowadays", "Kill No Man", "John Tom", and "Talk of the Town", as well as combination hits with The Mighty Diamonds ("Pretty Woman"), Badoo ("Rocking the 5000"), and Freddie McGregor ("Roots Man Skanking"). In 1981, he joined Henry "Junjo" Lawes' Volcano Sound system, and toured Canada. With Lawes, he recorded the album How the West Was Won, which is regarded as his best work, and went on to produce his own work and that of others such as Billy Boyo and Anthony Johnson. He toured the United Kingdom with the Jah Prophecy band and performed in Jamaica alongside Dennis Brown.

He was murdered in Jamaica in 1991 with Littel John present allegedly over the ownership of a gun.

== Albums ==
- How The West Was Won (1981) Greensleeves
- Toyan (1982) J&L
- Superstar Yellowman Has Arrived With Toyan (1982) Joe Gibbs (with Yellowman)
- DJ Clash (1982) Volcano/Greensleeves (with Nicodemus)
- Spar With Me (1982) Jah Guidance
- Ghetto Man Skank (1983) Silver Camel
- DJ Daddy (1983) Upfront
- Nice Time (1983) Jam Rock/Pre (with Triston Palma)
- Every Posse Want Me (1983) Live & Learn
- Murder (1983) Vista Sounds (with Tipper Lee & Johnny Slaughter)
- Hot Bubble Gum (1984) Power House
- Early Days Roots Tradition
