= Nicodemus (musician) =

Jamaican reggae deejay (1957–1996)

- Born: Cecil Wellington; 27 June 1957
- Origin: Jamaica
- Died: 26 August 1996 (aged 39)
- Genres: Reggae, dancehall
- Years active: 1976–1996

Cecil Wellington (1957–1996), better known as Nicodemus, was a Jamaican reggae deejay who released a string of albums in the 1980s and 1990s. Nicodemus was a pioneer of dancehall music and is credited with positively influencing many aspiring DJs. He is truly a dancehall legend. Partnering with the iconic Super Cat since the late-1970s, the dynamic duo (Nicodemus & Super Cat) released a string of local and commercially successful reggae hits. Hit songs that spring to mind are "Cabin Stabbin'" and "My Prerogative." Nicodemus died on 26 August 1996, of complications with diabetes.

== Biography ==
Born in Jamaica in 1957, he began his career in 1976 as a deejay with the Socialist Roots sound system. He moved to Prince Jammy's sound system in 1978 and towards the end of the decade also made his first studio recordings. His style was compared to Prince Far I and Prince Jazzbo. He had a big hit with "Boneman Connection" in 1981, and remained popular throughout the first half of the 1980s, becoming regarded as a dancehall veteran. His influence was clear on younger deejays such as John Taylor, aka Nicodemus Junior, who later had greater success after changing his stage name to Chaka Demus. After a lean period between the mid-1980s and the early 1990s, when his releases were less frequent, he re-emerged in 1994 with the album The Good, the Bad, the Ugly, and the Crazy, which was followed by Dancehall Giant in 1995, for which he embarked on a 7-week tour of the western United States alongside artists from the San Francisco-based Positive Sound Massive label (including Major Terror, Grandson Demus, and Stand Out Selector), and backed by the Chico CA based dancehall outfit Cornerstone Featuring Levi Jr. In 1996, he died from complications related to diabetes, aged 39, with a posthumous album, Dancehall Greats, issued two years later.

== Discography ==
- Gunman Connection (1982), Cha Cha
- Dancehall Style (1982), Black Joy
- She Love It in the Morning (1982), Channel One
- DJ Clash (1983), Greensleeves/Volcano – Nicodemus and Ranking Toyan
- A Nice Up the Dance (1983), Clappers
- The Very Best of Nicodemus (1983), Serious Gold
- Nuff Respect (1986), Skengdon
- Mr. Fabulous (1986), Music Master
- Cabbin Stabbin (1990) – with Necka Demus*, Junior Demus and Super Cat
- Old Veteran (1992), VP
- The Good, the Bad, The Ugly, and the Crazy (1994) – with Super Cat, Junior Cat, and Junior Demus
- Dancehall Giant (1995)
- Dancehall Greats (1998)
- Nicodemus and Dean Fraser (2003), Cactus
- Fatha Demus (2004), Massive B
- D.J. Clash (3 The Hard Way) (2007), Greensleeves – with Billy Boyo and Little Harry
- Serious Nicodemus volume 1 (2007), Sound System
- Serious Nicodemus volume 2 (2007), Sound System
