= Don Dada =

Don Dada may refer to:

== People ==
- Louie Rankin
- Menelik Nesta Gibbons

== Music ==
- Don Dada (album), a 1992 album by Super Cat
- Don Dada Mixtape Vol. 1, a 2021 mixtape by Alpha Wann
- "Don Dada", a 2010 song by Das Racist from Shut Up, Dude
- "Don Dada", a 2016 single by rapper K.O
- "DON DADA", a 2020 single by Cakes da Killa

== See also ==
- Dong Dada Diouf, nickname of Bernard Dong Bortey
