= Mikey Dread =

Jamaican musician (1954–2008)

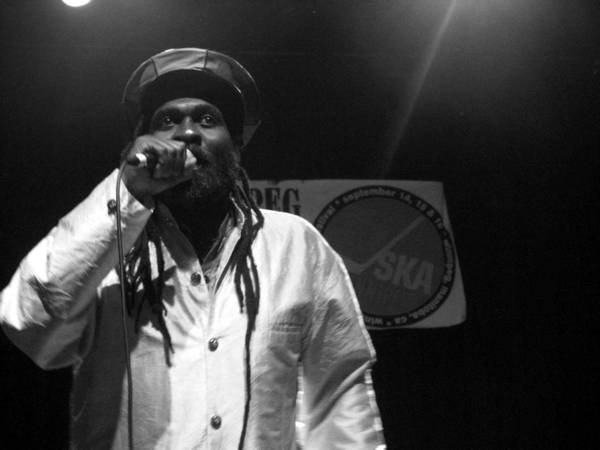
- Mikey Dread performing at the 2006 Winnipeg Ska and Reggae Festival.

Background information
- Born: Michael George Campbell; 4 June 1954; Port Antonio, Portland, Jamaica
- Died: 15 March 2008 (aged 53) Stamford, Connecticut, U.S.
- Occupations: Singer; author; composer, record producer; broadcaster
- Years active: 1978–2008
- Website: mikeydread.com

Michael George Campbell (4 June 1954 – 15 March 2008), better known as Mikey Dread, was a Jamaican singer, producer, and broadcaster.

== Biography ==
Born in Port Antonio, as one of five children, Campbell showed a natural aptitude for engineering and electronics from an early age. As a teenager he performed with the Safari and Sound of Music sound systems, and worked on his high school's radio station.

He studied electrical engineering at the College of Arts, Science and Technology, and in 1976, started out as an engineer with the Jamaica Broadcasting Corporation (JBC). Campbell wasn't impressed that the JBC's playlists mainly consisted of bland, foreign pop music at a time when some of the most potent reggae was being recorded in Jamaica. He convinced his JBC bosses to give him his own radio program called Dread at the Controls, where he played almost exclusively reggae. Before long, Campbell (now using the DJ name Mikey Dread) had the most popular program on the JBC. Well known for its fun and adventurous sonic style, Dread at the Controls became a hit all over Jamaica. Examples of Mikey Dread's distinctive radio chatter can be heard on the US release of the RAS label LP African Anthem Dubwise.

== Recording artist ==
In 1977, King Tubby encouraged Dread to begin recording after he visited Tubby's studio to cut a jingle over the riddim "Psalm of Dub". Tubby persuaded him to expand the jingle into a full-length recording and encouraged him to establish his own record label. The resulting "Love the Dread" became the first release on the Dread at the Controls label and reached number seven on the Jamaican charts.

He subsequently recorded with Lee "Scratch" Perry, who produced his signature tune "Dread at the Controls", and also recorded for Sonia Pottinger and Joe Gibbs and performed with the Socialist Roots Sound System. JBC's conservative management and Campbell clashed, and he quit in protest in 1978, becoming an engineer at the Treasure Isle studio, where he began an association with producer Carlton Patterson. They co-produced Dread's own work (including "Barber Saloon") and that of others.

Through Dread at the Controls, he worked with artists such as Edi Fitzroy, Sugar Minott, and Earl Sixteen, and produced his own work. The label released Dread's albums Evolutionary Rockers (released in the UK as Dread at the Controls) and World War III.

Campbell's music attracted the attention of British punk rock band the Clash, who invited him to England to tour with them in 1980. Although initially suspicious of the band, Campbell soon became friends with its members, producing their "Bankrobber" single and performing on several songs on their 1980 album Sandinista!. Campbell also toured with the Clash across Britain, Europe, and the US, gaining many new fans along the way. His live performances with the band included vocals on "Armagideon Time", as captured on the album From Here to Eternity: Live. He studied at the National Broadcasting School in London in 1980 and in 1984 studied advanced recording technology at the North London Polytechnic.

During the early 1980s he provided vocals for the reggae collective Singers And Players on the album Leaps and Bounds, an album which brought together Prince Far I, Creation Rebel, Headley Bennett, The Congos, Style Scott and The Roots Radics, and was released on Adrian Sherwood's On-U Sound record label. Dread produced ten dub tracks for UB40 and toured Europe and Scandinavia as their support artist.

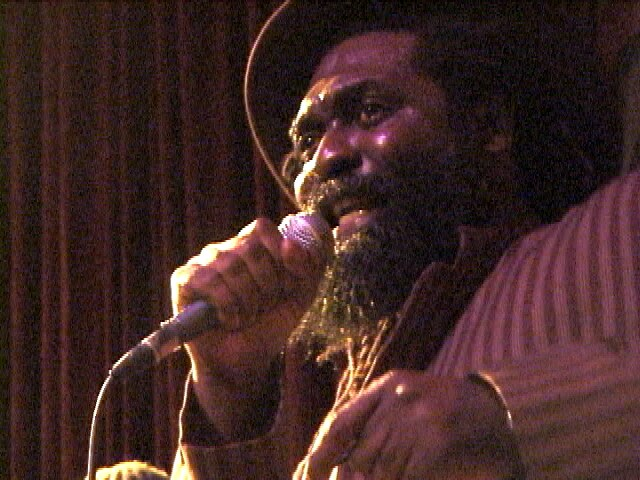
Mikey Dread performing at SOB's NYC on 8 April 2003

Some of his works in the United Kingdom include hosting series such as Rockers Roadshow and narrating the six-part Channel 4 reggae documentary series Deep Roots Music. He later recorded "The Source (Of Your Divorce)" for Warner Brothers Records US, which obtained regularly rotated video airplay.

In 1991, Dread recorded Profile and African Anthem Revisited. He also toured in Europe and the US with Freddie McGregor, Lloyd Parks, We The People Band, and the Roots Radics Band.

In 1992, he collaborated with former Guns N' Roses guitarist Izzy Stradlin on a duet entitled "Can't Hear 'Em". He was nominated for a NAIRD award, an award from the Billboard Magazine, for his work on his 1990 compilation album Mikey Dread's Best Sellers.

In 1993, Mikey Dread was involved in several projects, including his tour supporting the album Obsession and working in TV with the Caribbean Satellite Network (CSN) where he was Program Director and on Air personality as well as Producer of various shows.

In 1994 he presented The Culture Award of Honor in the Martin's International Reggae Music Awards in Chicago. In 1995, he worked as a Radio DJ for WAVS 1170 AM and WAXY-AM 790 in Miami, Florida. In 1996 he participated in the Essential Music Festival as a performer in Brighton, UK.

Mikey furthered his knowledge of TV/video production at the Art Institute of Ft. Lauderdale, where he graduated in 1996 with Honors and at Lynn University in Boca Raton / Florida where he earned a Bachelor of Arts degree in International Communications, with Magna Cum Laude honours.

He performed live with The Clash, UB40, Bob Dylan, Carlos Santana, Macka B, and many other bands and artists. He also produced artists such as Sugar Minott, Junior Murvin, Earl Sixteen, Wally Bucker, Sunshine, Jah Grundy and Rod Taylor. He also worked closely with producer Trevor Elliot to launch musical career of singer Edi Fitzroy. Mikey Dread was the featured artist on "Lips Like Sugar" with Seal for the soundtrack of the 2004 film, 50 First Dates.

== Move to Miami ==
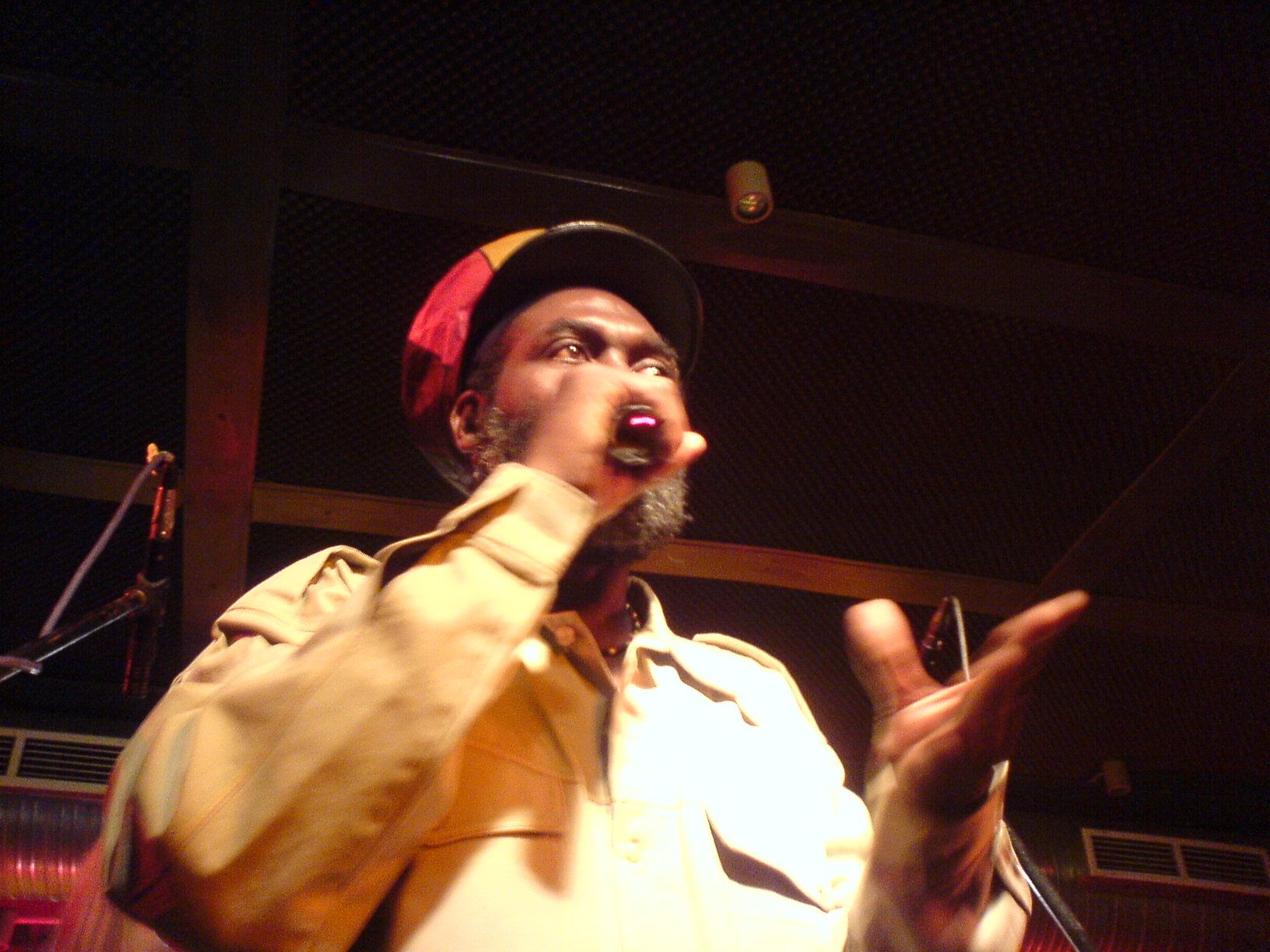
Mikey Dread, 2006

After many years working as a producer and singer, Campbell withdrew from the business and moved to Miami where he furthered his college education with courses in electronics and business, and ran the Caribbean Satellite Network TV station in Miami. Campbell shrewdly waited until all of his existing contracts expired and then regained control over his entire catalogue; he began re-releasing much of it on his own Dread at the Controls record label.

He performed at the Montreux Jazz Festival in 2002 and at Glastonbury Festival in 2004, and toured the UK in 2006.

Dread, together with The Blizzard of 78, featured on The Sandinista! Project, a tribute to the 1980 Clash album Sandinista!, with the song "Silicone on Sapphire". The tribute album, recorded in 2004, was released on 15 May 2007 by the 00:02:59 Records (a label named after a lyric from the Sandinista! song "Hitsville UK").

In October 2007, it was announced that Campbell was being treated for a brain tumor. He died on 15 March 2008, surrounded by his family, at the home of his sister in Stamford, Connecticut. He left seven children, three daughters and four sons, the youngest of whom was 4 months old when he died and who he had with his wife Monica.

== Discography ==
=== Studio albums ===
Year	Album
1979	African Anthem Additional information Released: 1979; Recorded: 1978; Label: Dread at the Controls (DATC LP 002); Format: LP; Producer: Mikey Dread; Track listing: 1. "Saturday Night Style" (Campbell) – 4:55; 2. "Industrial Spy" (Dread) – 4:25; 3. "Headline News" (Campbell) – 3:06; 4. "Mikey Dread in Action" (Campbell) – 5:10; 5. "Resignation Dub" (Campbell) – 5:01; 6. "Technical Selection" (Campbell) – 3:50; 7. "Comic Strip" (Campbell) – 3:02; 8. "Pre-Dawn Dub" (Campbell) – 3:21; 9. "Operator's Choice" (Campbell) – 4:45; 2004 and 2005 reissues bonus tracks: 10. "Ancestral Dub" – 2:51; 11. "Raggamuffin Dubstyle" – 3:48; 12. "JBC Days" / "Proper Education Dub" – 5:24; 13. "Freelancer Dub" – 4:34; 14. "Jumping Master Dub" – 1:44; 15. "Peacemaker Dub" – 4:07; Reissues: 1996 Big Cat (CD); 2004 Auralux (LUXXCD 005) (CD, alternative cover, bonus tracks, deluxe edition); 2005 Dread at the Controls (DATC CD 1033) (CD, alternative cover, bonus tracks, deluxe edition)
1979	Dread at the Controls Additional information Released: 1979; Recorded: 1979; Labels: Trojan (TRLS 178), Dread at the Controls; Format: LP; Producer: Mikey Dread; Track listing: 1. "Everybody Needs a Proper Education" – 7:20; 2. "Dread Combination" (Campbell) – 4:12; 3. "Love the Dread" (Campbell) – 2:55; 4. "The Voice of Jah" – 3:42; 5. "Step by Step" – 4:52; 6. "Walk Rastafari Way" (Campbell) – 3:45; 7. "King in the Ring" – 3:58; 8. "Barber Saloon" (Campbell) – 7:20; 2005 reissues bonus tracks: 9. "African Map" – 4:17; 10. "School Girl" – 4:06; 11. "East Portland Dub" – 4:06; 12. "Bull Bay Dubwize" – 3:28; 13. "DATC Tribute to King Tubby" – 3:17; 14. "Voice of Dub" – 3:30; 15. "Internal Energy Dubmix" – 2:54; 16. "Rastadub" – 2:58; 17. "School Girl Dub" – 4:11; Reissues: 1979 (as Evolutionary Rockers) Dread at the Controls (LP); 1989 (as Evolutionary Rockers) Dread at the Controls (CD, bonus tracks); 2001 Trojan (37311781) (LP); 2005 Dread at the Controls (DATC CD 2014; mikeydread11) (CD, bonus tracks); 2007 (as Evolutionary Rockers) Dread at the Controls (CD, bonus tracks); Notes: Dread at the Controls has been released by DATC as Evolutionary Rockers in 1979, 1989, and 2007 with different cover arts and track listings.
1980	World War III Additional information Released: 1980; Recorded: 1980; Label: Dread at the Controls (TNT1); Format: LP; Producer: Mikey Dread; Track listing: 1. "The Jumping Master" (Campbell) – 5:09; 2. "Break Down the Walls" (Campbell) – 5:28; 3. "Jah Jah Love (In the Morning)" (Campbell) – 6:47; 4. "Israel" (12 Tribe) / "Stylee" (Extended Play) (Campbell) – 3:40; 5. "Money Dread" (Campbell) – 3:34; 6. "Mental Slavery" (Campbell) – 6:06; 7. "Skin Head Skank" (Campbell) – 3:22; 8. "Losers Weepers, Finders Keepers" (Campbell) – 6:45; 9. "World War III" (Extended Play) (Campbell) – 6:13; 2002 reissue bonus tracks: 10. "Warrior Stylee" (Campbell) – 5:17; 11. "DATC Masterpiece" (Campbell) – 3:36; 12. "Break Down the Dub" (Campbell) – 3:14; 13. "Seekers Dub" (Campbell) – 3:13; 14. "Jamaican Dub" (Campbell) – 2:53; 15. "Flat Fee Dub" (Campbell) – 3:02; Reissues: 1981 Hearthbeat (HB-02) (LP); 2002 Dread at the Controls (DATC LP TNT 1) (CD, bonus tracks)
1981	Beyond World War III Additional information Released: 1981; Recorded: 1980–1981; Label: Big Cat; Format: LP; Producer: Mikey Dread; Track listing: 1. "Break Down the Walls" (Campbell) – 5:47; 2. "Jah Jah Love (In the Morning)" (Campbell) – 7:14; 3. "The Jumping Master" (Campbell) – 5:39; 4. "Israel" (12 Tribe) / "Stylee" (Extended Play) (Campbell) – 8:44; 5. "Warrior Stylee" (Extended Stero Style) (Campbell) – 7:51; 6. "Money Dread" (Campbell) – 3:33; 7. "Rockers Delight" (Extended Play) (Campbell) – 8:05; 8. "Mental Slavery" (Campbell) – 6:35; 9. "World War III" (Campbell) – 3:43; Reissues: 1996 Big Cat (23131521)(LP); 1996 Big Cat (23131522)(CD); 1997 Big Cat (80109)(CD); 1999 Big Cat (109)(CD); unknown date Heartbeat (CD-HB-02)(CD)
1982	Dub Catalogue Volume 1 Additional information Released: 1982; Recorded: 1982; Label: Dread at the Controls (DATC LP 005); Format: LP; Producer: Mikey Dread; Track listing: 1. "Demo Dub" – 5:35; 2. "Raving Style" – 3:12; 3. "Dub Addict" – 3:21; 4. "Stereo Dub" – 3:04; 5. "Brain Wave" – 2:32; 6. "Two Track Dub" – 6:13; 7. "Front Room Dub" – 3:17; 8. "Control Tower Dub" – 3:26; 9. "Reflexion Dub" – 3:36; 10. "Dreadlocks Dub" – 3:23; 2006 reissue bonus track: 11. "Queen Dub" (Campbell) – 4:13; Reissue: 2006 Dread at the Controls (CD, bonus tracks); Notes: The 2006 reissue has "Front Room Dub" on track number 6 and "Two Track Dub" on track number 7.
1982	Dub Merchant Additional information Released: 1982; Recorded: 1982; Label: Dread at the Controls (DATC LP 009); Format: LP; Producer: Mikey Dread; Track listing: 1. "Freestyle Dubatak" – 5:38; 2. "Theme from Solidarity" – 4:09; 3. "Dub Trakarak" – 4:03; 4. "Klappaz Konekshan" – 4:03; 5. "3 O'Clock Dubatak" – 5:25; 6. "Gully Bank Dub" – 3:24; 7. "River Nile Style" – 3:05; 8. "Radix Revenge" – 3:03; 9. "Tricky Track" – 4:20; 10. "Dub Venture" – 3:47; 11. "Jamba Dub" – 1:48; 12. "Dubservation" – 3:20; Reissue: 2006 Dread at the Controls (CD)
1982	Jungle Signal Additional information Released: 1982; Recorded: 1982; Label: Dread at the Controls; Format: LP; Producer: Mikey Dread; Track listing: 1. "Signal One" – 6:12; 2. "Jungle Signal" – 5:48; 3. "Signal Three Dub" – 6:12; 4. "Rainbow Jungle" – 2:40; 5. "Star Chaser" – 4:40; 6. "Jungle Gym" – 5:01; 7. "Jungle Juice" – 3:05; 8. "Dub Jungle" – 3:59; 9. "Theme Signal" – 5:34; 10. "Jungle Delight" – 3:20; Reissue: 2006 Dread at the Controls (CD)
1982	Pave the Way Additional information Released: 1982; Recorded: 1982; Label: Heartbeat; Format: LP; Producer: Mikey Dread; Track listing (CD): 1. "Pave the Way" – 4:17; 2. "Reggae" / "Hit Shot" – 5:12; 3. "Roots and Culture" – 6:06; 4. "Sunday School" – 3:37; 5. "Knock Knock" – 4:44; 6. "(Open the Gate) Come In" – 5:11; 7. "Freedom... Is Coming" – 4:37; 8. "(Dance) Face to Face" – 4:22; 9. "Forever and Ever" – 5:12; 10. "Everchanging World" – 4:20; 11. "Quest for Oneness" – 2:56; 12. "Time Waster" – 3:02; 13. "Relax/Enjoy Yourself" – 2:45; 14. "Have You Got a Minute to Spare?" – 3:19; 15. "Dizzy (Herb Smoker)" – 4:09; 16. "Paradise" – 4:19; 17. "Too Many Rulers" – 3:32; Reissues: 1985 Heartbeat (CD); 1990 Heartbeat Select Cassette; 1999 Heartbeat (CDHB) (CD); 2005 Dread at the Controls (mikeydread8) (CD)
1982	S.W.A.L.K. Additional information Released: 1982; Recorded: 1982; Label: Heartbeat (HB009 [US] / HB09 [UK, alternate cover]); Format: LP; Producer: Mikey Dread; Track listing: 1. "Rocky Road" – 3:15; 2. "S.W.A.L.K." – 8:27; 3. "Positive Reality" – 3:11; 4. "Heavy-Weight Sound" – 5:08; 5. "Problems" – 3:27; 6. "Zodiac Signs" – 6:12; 7. "Armagiddeon Style" – 3:41; 8. "In Memory (Jacob, Marcus & Marley)" – 3:20; 2004 reissue bonus track: 9. "Sweet Sixteen" – 4:32; 10. "Come Along" – 4:42; 11. "Strictly Rockers" – 5:20; 12. "Heavy Weight Dub" – 5:58; 13. "Star Sign Dub" – 8:33; Reissues: 1990 Heartbeat Select (09) Cassette; 2004 Dread at the Controls (DATC CD 2004) (CD, bonus tracks)
1989	Happy Family Additional information Released: 1989; Recorded: 1989; Label: RAS; Format: CD; Producer: Mikey Dread; Track listing: 1. "Happy Family" – 4:16; 2. "Your Love" – 4:06; 3. "Good-Bye" – 4:05; 4. "African Soldiers" – 4:17; 5. "Nelson Mandela" – 4:01; 6. "Perfect Woman" – 3:42; 7. "Come Back" – 3:50; 8. "Ready to Settle Down" – 4:11; 9. "The Seagull" – 3:42; 10. "I See Jah" – 4:06
1991	Profile Additional information Released: 1991; Recorded: 1991; Label: RAS (RAS CD 3081); Format: CD, Cassette; Producer: Mikey Dread; Track listing: 1. "Break Down the Walls" (Dread); 2. "Fatten Frogs for Snakes" (Campbell); 3. "Pleasure Knowing U (Plus Dub for U)" (Campbell); 4. "Profile" (Campbell); 5. "Sugarcain" (Campbell); 6. "I Need Your Loving" (Campbell); 7. "Cater for Your Loving" (Campbell); 8. "Still My No. 1" (Campbell); 9. "Strangers in Love" (Campbell); 10. "Cruizing" (Campbell); 11. "Sentiments of Love" (Campbell); 12. "Awake With Jab" (Campbell); Reissue: 2005 Dread at the Controls (mikeydread6) (CD)
1991	African Anthem Revisited Additional information Released: 1991; Recorded: 1991; Label: RAS (RAS CD 3082); Format: CD; Producer: Mikey Dread; Track listing: 1. "Pleased to Dub You" (Campbell) – 3:44; 2. "Break Down the Dub" (Dread) – 3:29; 3. "Fatten Dub for Snakes Campbell) – 2:52; 4. "Stangers in Dub" (Campbell) – 4:41; 5. "Dub File" (Campbell) – 5:05; 6. "The Source of Dub" (Campbell) – 3:08; 7. "Sweet Dub" (Campbell) – 5:19; 8. "Awake With Dub" (Campbell) – 3:44; 9. "Still My No. 1 Dub" (Campbell) – 3:56; 10. "So Much Dub" (Campbell) – 5:07; 11. "Need Your Dub" (Campbell) – 4:45; 12. "Cruizin Dub" (Campbell) – 4:02; Reissue: 2005 Dread at the Controls (mikeydread14) (CD)
1992	Obsession Additional information Released: 1992; Recorded: 1992; Label: Rykodisc (20243); Format: CD; Producer: Mikey Dread; Track listing: 1. "Modern Africa" (Campbell); 2. "Obsession" (Campbell, Sterrett); 3. "Love Connection" (Campbell, Sterrett); 4. "One Night Lover" (Campbell); 5. "Muscle Up" (Campbell); 6. "Museum of Love" (Campbell); 7. "Love Encore" (Campbell, Sterrett); 8. "This Inspiration" (Campbell); 9. "So Many Hills to Climb" (Campbell); 10. "Global Harmony" (Campbell); 11. "Fighting for Truth and Rights" (Campbell); 12. "iddung 'Pon Money" (Campbell); 13. "Livin' in the Jungle" (Campbell); 14. "Give the Children Education" (Campbell); 15. "Tomorrow Will Be Better" (Campbell); 16. "African Princess" (Campbell); 17. "Line of King David" (Campbell); 18. "Full Moon in the Desert" (Campbell)
1995	Come to Mikey Dread's Dub Party Additional information Released: 1995; Recorded: 1995; Label: ROIR (8208); Format: CD; Producer: Mikey Dread; Track listing: 1. "Dub Party" (Campbell) – 3:58; 2. "Buh Yah Kah" (Campbell) – 5:00; 3. "Sound Check" (Campbell) – 3:31; 4. "Tourist Dub" (Campbell) – 4:09; 5. "Haile Selassie Centenary Dub (July 2, 1892 – July 23, 1992)" (Campbell) – 4:14; 6. "Special Request Dub" (Campbell) – 4:06; 7. "Joyride" (Campbell) – 4:12; 8. "Everyday Dub" (Campbell) – 3:56; 9. "Cover Dub" – 3:53; 10. "Mother's Day Dub" (Campbell) – 3:48; 11. "Ragamuffin Style" (Campbell) – 3:13; 12. "Womanizer Dubtract" (Campbell) – 2:58; 13. "(Roir) Commercial Dub" – 4:14; 14. "Impulsive Emotions Dub" – 4:03; 15. "Cherry Pie" – 4:29; 16. "Black Supremacy for South Africa" (Campbell) – 4:38; Reissue: 2005 Dread at the Controls (mikeydread10) (CD)
2000	World Tour Additional information Released: 2000; Recorded: 2000; Label: Dread at the Controls; Format: CD; Producer: Mikey Dread; Track listing: 1. "Life Is Strange" – 5:09; 2. "Loving You" – 3:54; 3. "Weekend" – 4:14; 4. "Princess" – 4:31; 5. "My Religion" – 3:55; 6. "World Tour" – 4:01; 7. "Homeless People" – 4:02; 8. "As We Enter" – 3:46; 9. "Original General" – 7:35; 10. "I Love My Mother" – 4:49; 11. "Behold Jah" – 3:35; 12. "Water Molecule" – 3:34; 13. "Election Night" – 4:56; 14. "I'll Be Yours" – 4:18; 15. "Sorry" – 4:44; 16. "Chosen Few" – 5:01
2002	Rasta in Control Additional information Released: 2002; Recorded: 2002; Label: Dread at the Controls (3000); Format: CD; Producer: Mikey Dread; Track listing: 1. "Rasta in Control" (Campbell) – 4:59; 2. "Inna Foreign" (Campbell, Hines, Myton, Reedy) – 3:16; 3. "Equal Rights" (Campbell) – 4:02; 4. "Like You" (Campbell) – 4:45; 5. "Give It a Chance" (Campbell) – 3:57; 6. "Reggae Session" (Campbell) – 3:56; 7. "Keep Smiling" (Campbell) – 4:51; 8. "Prophecy" (Campbell) – 4:35; 9. "Debut Performance" (Campbell) – 4:12; 10. "How We Used to Live" (Campbell, Easy, Vernal) – 4:10; 11. "Great God of Glory" (Campbell) – 3:16; 12. "Rasta Irie Oki" (Campbell) – 3:17; 13. "His Imperial Majesty" (Campbell) – 4:10; 14. "Sacrifice" (Campbell) – 2:48; 15. "Prediction" (Campbell) – 2:58; 16. "Hawaii Surfer" (Campbell) – 4:09; 17. "Year of Decision" (Campbell) – 3:26; 18. "Groove City" (Campbell) – 3:26
2007	Life Is a stage Additional information Released: 2007; Recorded: 2007; Label: Dread at the Controls; Format: CD; Producer: Mikey Dread; Track listing: 1. "Praise Jah Jah" – 4:09; 2. "Life Is a Stage" – 5:16; 3. "Pound a Weed" – 3:21; 4. "Destiny" – 4:34; 5. "Backstage Pass" – 4:34; 6. "Barcoding" – 4:22; 7. "Teenage Pregnancy" – 4:49; 8. "I'm Not the Kind" – 4:26; 9. "Oh No" – 4:58; 10. "Soundbwoy Special" – 5:16; 11. "Dread Next Door" – 4:56; 12. "Passing Through" – 5:11; 13. "First Generation" – 4:45; 14. "Point of View" – 5:17; 15. "Stem Cells" – 6:15

=== Compilations ===
Year	Album
1989	African Anthem / Happy Family Additional information Released: 1989; Recorded: 1979–1989; Label: RAS Records (RASCD-3035); Format: CD; Producer: Mikey Dread; Note: African Anthem (1979) and Happy Family (1989) on one CD.
1989	S.W.A.L.K. / Rockers Vibrations Additional information Released: 1989; Recorded: 1982–1989; Label: Heartbeat Records (HB 11568); Format: CD; Producer: Mikey Dread; Note: S.W.A.L.K. (1982) is combined with a compilation of Dread productions on Heartbeat Records.
1991	Best Sellers Additional information Released: 20 May 1991; Recorded: 1979–1989; Label: Rykodisc (RCD 20178 and RACS 0178-2); Format: CD and cassette Producer: Mikey Dread; Track listing All tracks written by Mikey Dread: 1. "Quest for Oneness" – 3:03; 2. "Break Down the Walls" – 4:43; 3. "Goodbye" – 3:59; 4. "Industrial Spy" – 4:24; 5. "Wake-Up Call" – 3:38; 6. "Warrior Stylee" – 4:30; 7. "S.W.A.L.K." – 5:17; 8. "Barber Saloon-Haircut" – 4:05; 9. "Choose Me" – 4:40; 10. "Jah Jah Love (In the Morning)" – 7:39; 11. "Sunday School" – 3:41; 12. "Positive Reality" – 3:22; 13. "Enjoy Yourself" – 3:25; 14. "Roots and Culture" – 6:10; 15. "Knock Knock" – 4:42; 16. "My Religion" (live with Roots Radics) – 3:45; 2003 reissue bonus tracks: 17. "Dizzy"; 18. "The Source" (live with Roots Radics); Reissue: 2003 Dread at the Controls (DATC CD 2003) (CD, alternative cover, bonus tracks, deluxe edition)
1998	The Prime of Mikey Dread: Massive Dub Cuts from 1978–1992 Additional information Released: 1998; Recorded: 1978–1992; Label: Dread at the Controls, Music Club; Format: CD; Producer: Mikey Dread; Track listing: 1. "Resignation Dub" (Michael Campbell); 2. "Industrial Spy" (Mikey Dread); 3. "Barber Saloon" (Campbell); 4. "S.W.A.L.K." (Dread); 5. "Modern Africa" (Campbell); 6. "Saturday Night Style" (Campbell); 7. "Sunday School" (Dread); 8. "Dizzy (Herb Smoker)"; 9. "Pre-Dawn Dub" (Campbell); 10. "Wake-Up Call" (instrumental) (Dread); 11. "Roots and Culture" (Dread); 12. "Buh Yuk Kah"; 13. "Technical Selection" (Campbell)
2006	Best Sellers II Additional information Released: 4 January 2006; Label: Dread at the Controls (DATC CD 2015); Format: CD; Producer: Mikey Dread; Track listing: 1. "Natural Rasta" – 4:15; 2. "Childhood Days" – 3:59; 3. "African Map" – 4:24; 4. "Jungle Signal" – 6:06; 5. "Change Is Coming" – 4:10; 6. "Pound of Weed" – 4:05; 7. "Rub a Dub" – 3:50; 8. "Equal Rights" – 4:02; 9. "Rockers Delight" – 5:40; 10. "Get Up and Dance" – 2:30; 11. "Autobiography" – 6:41; 12. "Rockers Roadshow" – 2:54; 13. "Surfer" – 4:09; 14. "Backstage Dub" – 4:19; 15. "Vegetable Matter" – 4:42; 16. "Dub Is the Roots" – 5:49
2006	Dread at the Controls / Evolutionary Rockers Additional information Released: 4 January 2006; Recorde: 1979; Label: Dread at the Controls; Format: CD; Producer: Mikey Dread; Note: Dread at the Controls (1979) and Evolutionary Rockers (1979) on one CD. Track listing: 1. "Dread Combination – 4:12; 2. "Walk Ras Tafari Way – 3:45; 3. "Proper Education – 7:20; 4. "King in the Ring – 3:58; 5. "Step by Step – 4:52; 6. "Love the Dread – 2:55; 7. "The Voice of Jah – 3:42; 8. "Barber Saloon – 7:20; 9. "African Map – 4:17; 10. "School Girl – 4:06; 11. "East Portland Dub – 4:06; 12. "Bull Bay Dubwize – 3:28; 13. "Datc Tribute to King Tubby – 3:17; 14. "Voice of Dub – 3:30; 15. "Internal Energy Dubmix – 2:54; 16. "Rastadub – 2:58; 17. "School Girl Dub – 4:11

=== Singles ===
- "Love the Dread" (1978), DATC
- "Step By Step" (1978), 40 Leg
- "Barber Saloon" (1978), Warrior
- "Roots Man Revival" (1979), High Note
- "African Rap" (1979), Wild Flower
- "Rasta Born Baby" (1979), Roots International
- "African Map" (1979), DATC
- "Break Down the Walls" (1980) (DREAD 1)
- "Rockers Delight" (1980), DATC
- "Jumping Master" (1980), DATC
- "Reggae Gone International" (1980), DATC
- "Warrior Stylee" (1981), DATC
- "Positive Reality" (1982), DAT
- "Rocky Road" (1982), DATC/Do It
- "Roots & Culture" / "Jungle Dread" (1982), DATC (DATCD 008)
- "Bad Man Posseé" (1982), DATC - with Junior Murvin
- "Pound A Weed" (1982), DATC - with Roots Radics
- "Warning" (1982), DATC
- "Heavy Weight Style" (1982), Do It
- "Sunday School" (1983), DATC
- "Reggae Hit Shot" (1984), DEP International
- "Knock Knock" (1985), DEP International
- "Rude Little Dread" (1986), DATC
- "The Source (Of Your Divorce)" (1989), Warner Bros US
- "Choose Me" (1989), DATC
- "King of Kings" (2001), Higher Ground

=== Appears on ===
- Sandinista! (1980; album by The Clash)
- The Trojan Story Vol. 2 (1982; compilation album by various artists; TALL 200)
- Singers and Players – Staggering Heights (1983; On-U Sound), "School Days"
- Singers and Players – Leaps and Bounds (1984; Cherry Red), "Autobiography (Dread Operator)" and "Vegetable Matter"
- Funky Reggae Crew – Strictly Hip-Hop Reggae Fusion (1989; compilation album by various artists; 926 011-1)
- The Roots of Reggae Vol. 1 (1991; compilation album by various artists; MCCD 014)
- Larks From the Ark (1995; compilation album by Lee "Scratch" Perry; NTMCD 511)
- History of Trojan Records 1972–1995 Volume 2 (1996; compilation album by various artists)
- Arkology (1997; compilation album by Lee "Scratch" Perry; CRNCD 6)
- Rockers Galore (1999; compilation album by The Clash; ESK 47144)
- Classic Reggae: The Producers (2000; compilation album by various artists; MCCD 444)
- Dub Reggae Essentials (2000; compilation album by various artists)
- Blunted in the Bomb Shelter Mix (2002; compilation album by Madlib; ANTCD102)
- Auralux Reggae Showcase (2004; compilation album by various artists; LUXXCD007)
- 50 First Dates (2004; compilation album by various artists)
- Radio Clash (2004; compilation album by various artists)
- Best 1991–2004 (2004; compilation album by Seal)
- Echodelic Sounds of Future Pigeon (2006; album by Future Pigeon)
- Singles Box (2006; compilation album by The Clash; Sony BMG)
- Down in a Tenement Yard: Sufferation and Love in the Ghetto 1973–1980 (2007; compilation album by various artists; TJDDD352)
- Family Front (2008; Album by Habakuk; 5935240)
- Royale Rockers: Reggae Sessions (2008; album by Casino Royale)
- Iration – Generation Time (Ft. Mikey Dread)
