= Dennis Walks =

Jamaican singer

- Born: Dennis Vassell
- Origin: Spanish Town, St Catherine Parish, Jamaica
- Genres: Reggae, Conscious Roots Reggae, Dub
- Years active: 1968–present
- Labels: Moodisc

Dennis Vassell, better known as Dennis Walks, is a Jamaican reggae singer, best known for his work with Harry Mudie in the late 1960s and 1970s. His stage name was given to him by Roy Shirley.

== Life and career ==
Walks first recorded in 1963 for Duke Reid at Treasure Isle. In the late 1960s, he recorded for producer Joe Gibbs ("Having a Party"), but is best known for his recordings with producer Harry Mudie; "The Drifter" and "Heart Don't Leap" were both big hit singles in Jamaica. In 1974 he had another hit with "Margaret", backed by the Mudie's All Stars, which formed the basis of Lennie Hibbert's "Margaret's Dream". In 1975 he had a hit on the UK reggae charts with "Sad Sweet Dreamer" and a reissue of "Margaret". Walks' debut album Meet Dennis Walks, collecting several of his earlier hits, was released on the Moodisc label in 1976. The "Drifter" rhythm has been reworked by several artists over the years, including versions by conscious roots reggae vocalists Dennis Brown and Cornell Campbell, as well as deejay versions released by I Roy, Ranking Trevor, and eventually, Reggae Bible (Book of Drifters), an entire King Tubby's-mixed album based on the track was collected and compiled, featuring Gladstone Anderson, Tommy McCook, Bongo Herman and the Mudies All Stars .

Walks also worked with Bunny Lee, and Prince Jazzbo in the late 1960s and 1970s and continued to release singles into the 1990s. In 1975, he worked with sound engineer and vocalist Pat Kelly (musician), on a Rockers tune, "Only Jah Knows," with R & B Doo Wop stylings on the vocal arrangement, then in 1978, he worked with Errol Thompson (audio engineer) and Joe Gibbs (producer) on a conscious roots reggae 45 release, "Almighty I" backed by the dub "Forgive Them Rasta." In the same period, Walks, Gibbs and Thompson also released the spiritually conscious "Navel String" 45, which resonated with the roots reggae aware, lyrically spiritual reflections and themes of the day. He had further hits in the early 1980s with "The Lover", and in 1982, working with the Roots Radics on slower, more spacious Scientist engineered Dancehall arrangements that were in ascendance at the time, Walks released the "Roast Fish and Cornbread" Discomix (with Billy Boyo), pressed on the prolific Greensleeves Records label in the United Kingdom.

In 2004 he released the Gwanee Gwanee album, recorded with Mafia & Fluxy. He has performed in the 21st century in "oldies" shows such as Stars R Us and Vintage Showcase.

== Discography ==
=== Albums ===
- Meet Dennis Walks (1976), Moodisc
- Gwanee Gwanee (2004), Jet Star

=== Singles ===
- "Having a Party" (1968), Amalgamated
- "Uncle Sam's Country" (196?), Amalgamated – promo only
- "Belly Lick" (1968), Blue Cat
- "Heart Don't Leap" (1969), Bullet
- "Love of My Life" (1969), Bullet
- "The Drifter" (1969), Crab – B-side of Grossett's "Run Girl Run"
- "Combination Drifter" (1970), Afro – with I Roy
- "Heart Don't Leap" (1971), Moodisc – with I Roy
- "Time Will Tell" (1971), Moodisc
- "Snowbird" (1971), Afro – with instruments by Mudies All Stars, piano by Gladstone Anderson and female backup vocals by The S.P.M.s though uncredited on a 45 RPM single
- "Ooh Wee Baby" (1972), Moodisc
- "Margaret" (1974), Count Shelly
- "Sad Sweet Dreamer" (1974), Moodisc
- "Misty" (1975), HAM
- "Don't Play That Song" (1975), Magnet
- "Pretty Dress" (197?), Conrack
- "Almighty I" (1978), Joe Gibbs
- "Togetherness" (1978), Velvet Sound
- "Fancy Dress" (1980), Orbit
- "Drifter" (1981), Jah Guidance – 12-inch
- "Roast Fish & Cornbread" (1982), Greensleeves
- "Fisherman" (198?), Midnight Rock
- "Don't Worry" (19??), Everglaids
- "Only Time Will Tell" (19??), Moodisc
- "Shoulder To Shoulder" (19??), Ujama
- "Business" (1985), Hard Rock
- "Better To Be Early" (1987), Arietha Productions
- "You Could A Deal" (1992), Mandingo
- "True Love Is All I Need" (1992), Mandingo
- "Father And Son" (19??), Icom – Dennis Walks & Zebra
- "Drifter Mix" (2010), Jah Life – Dennis Walks & Carl Meeks
