= Peter Metro =

- Also known as: Peter Ranking
- Born: Peter Clarke c. 1960 (age 64–65)
- Origin: Kingston, Jamaica
- Genres: Reggae
- Occupation: DJ
- Instrument: Vocals

Peter Metro (born Peter Clarke, Kingston, Jamaica, c.1960) is a reggae deejay, who released five albums in the 1980s.

== Biography ==
Initially performing under the name Peter Ranking, he changed his name when he discovered that another deejay was using that name, and since he was resident deejay on the Metromedia sound system, he chose the name Peter Metro. His use of Spanish gained him many fans in South America, and he is acknowledged as the first multilingual reggae toaster. His work with Yellowman and Fathead on the albums Yellowman, Fathead, and the one Peter Metro (1982) and Live With Yellowman and Sassafrass (1984) kept his profile high through to the mid-1980s. He appeared at the Reggae Sunsplash festival in 1987 with English deejay Dominic, captured on the Reggae Sunsplash Dancehall X '87 video. In 1989, he appeared as a guest on the CD Bora Bora by the Brazilian rock band Os Paralamas do Sucesso. He performed the song "The Can" and "Don't Give Me That", the latter one being an anti-cocaine statement which made reference to Richard Pryor's mishap with crack in 1980. Metro contributed ‘Oh No Baby Don’t Go’ to The Dance Hall Album (1998) when UB40 invited guests to produce their own versions of songs from the backing tracks of their 1997 album ‘Guns in the Ghetto’.

== Albums ==
- Yellowman, Fathead & The One Peter Metro (1982) Abissa
- Sinbad & the Metric System (1983) CSA (Peter Metro & Captain Sinbad With Little John)
- Dedicated to You (1984) CSA (with Yellowman, Lady Anne, and Squiddly Ranking)
- Live with Yellowman and Sassafrass (1984)
- No Problem (1985) Power House
- The D.J. Don (1986) Black Solidarity
