= Super Cat =

Jamaican DJ (born 1963)

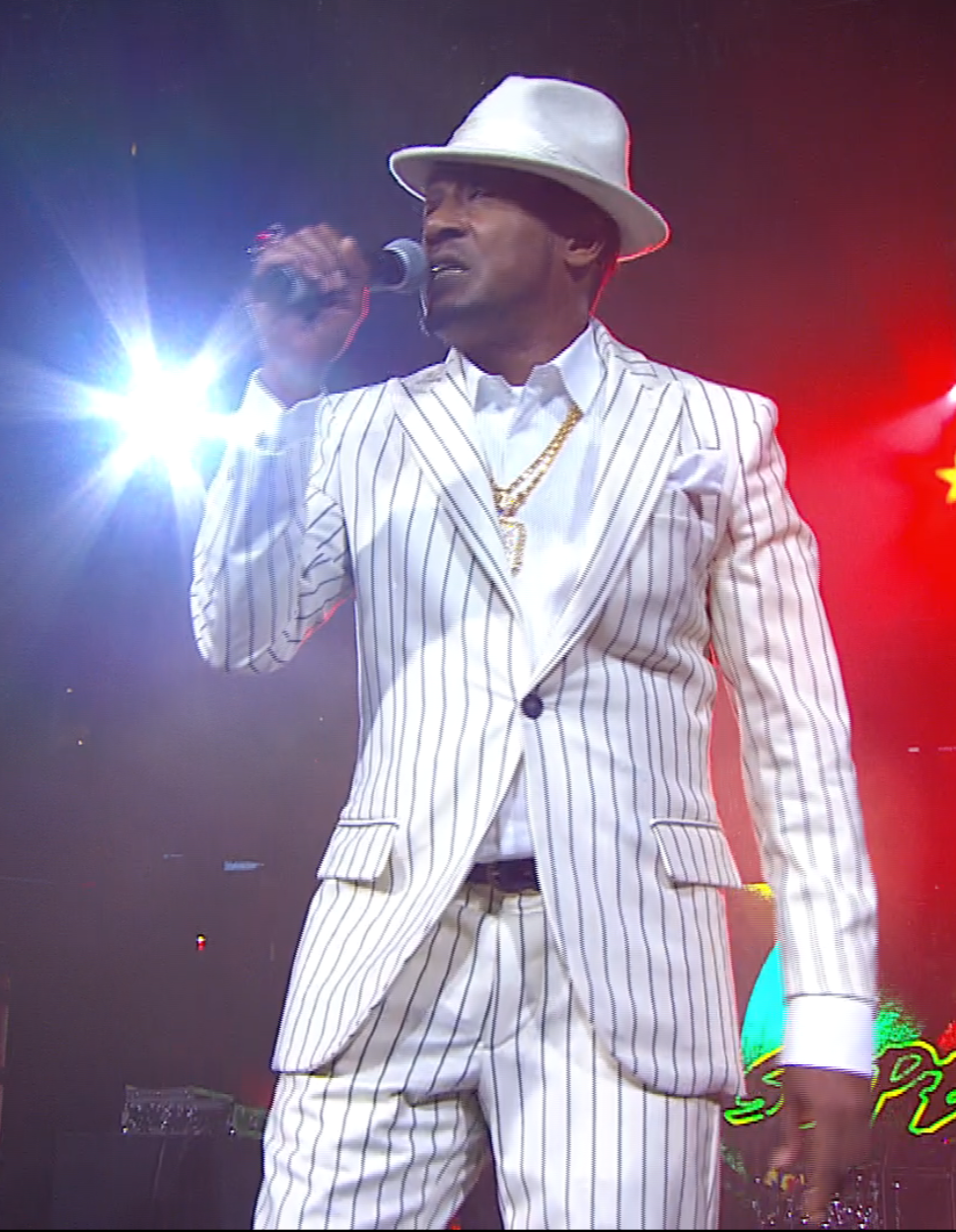
- Super Cat performing in 2021

Background information
- Also known as: Wild Apache
- Born: William Anthony Maragh; 25 June 1963 (age 63); Kingston, Jamaica
- Genres: Dancehall; reggae; reggae fusion
- Occupation: Deejay
- Instrument: Vocals
- Years active: 1981–present
- Labels: Columbia; Sony

William Anthony Maragh (born 25 June 1963), also known as Super Cat, is a Jamaican deejay who achieved widespread popularity during the late 1980s and early 1990s dancehall movement. His nickname, "Wild Apache", was given to him by his mentor Early B. Super Cat is considered one of the greatest deejays in the history of the Jamaican dancehall scene.

== Biography ==
Born a Dougla to an Afro-Jamaican mother and Indo-Jamaican father, Super Cat was raised in Kingston's tough Seivright Gardens neighbourhood, then known as Cockburn Pen, home to ground-breaking deejays like Prince Jazzbo and U-Roy. At the age of seven the Soul Imperial sound system allowed him to assist them at a local club called Bamboo Lawn. He auditioned for Joe Gibbs as a singer but was unsuccessful.

After leaving his family home in Kingston at the age of ten, Super Cat credits Ranking Trevor as the first man who passed him the mic. He lived in the Arnett Gardens area, and even briefly took shelter in the Calvary cemetery, before being caught up in a police raid and jailed at the infamous the General Penitentiary at the age of seventeen. After his release two years later, he soon began appearing as a deejay under the name "Cat-A-Rock" and the "Wild Apache," but soon switched to the name Super Cat. His first single "Mr. Walker", produced by Winston Riley, was released in 1981 and established his recording career. He went on to record for Jah Thomas ("Walk-a-ton," on which he was billed as 'Super Cat the Indian'), but his career was interrupted by a period of incarceration. After his release he began working with Early B on the Killamanjaro sound system in 1984, and his debut album, Si Boops Deh!, was released in 1985, and included the hit singles "Boops" (which was based on Steely & Clevie's updated "Feel Like Jumping" rhythm and sparked a craze for songs about sugar daddies), and "Cry Fi De Youth", establishing his style of dancehall with conscious lyrics.

He started his own Wild Apache Productions label and began producing his recordings, including the 1988 album Sweets for My Sweet. He featured on the album Cabin Stabbin' in 1991 along with Nicodemus and Junior Demus. He had been scheduled to perform at the One Love concert in the UK in 1991, but his appearance was cancelled after the shooting death of Nitty Gritty, for which Super Cat was initially suspected but cleared in 1992. Continuing success saw him move to the United States and sign a contract with Columbia Records, releasing one of the first dancehall albums on a major label, Don Dada (1992). The following year, Sony Music issued The Good, the Bad, the Ugly, and the Crazy, teaming Super Cat with Nicodemus, Junior Demus and Junior Cat.

Super Cat had a number of hit singles in the early 1990s, including "Don Dada", "Ghetto Red Hot" and "Dem No Worry We" with Heavy D. In 1992, he was featured on the remix of "Jump" with Kris Kross, and he also collaborated with them in 1993 for their song "Alright". These hits made him The Source magazine dance hall artist of the year in 1993. He was also an early collaborator with The Notorious B.I.G., featuring the then relatively unknown artist (along with Mary J. Blige, 3rd Eye and Puff Daddy) on the B-side remix of "Dolly My Baby" in 1993. The title song, "Don Dada" was a reply to many jabs made by Ninjaman.

His version of Fats Domino's "My Girl Josephine", performed with Jack Radics, was included in the soundtrack to the film Prêt-à-Porter in 1994. In 1997, he was featured on the hit single "Fly" by Sugar Ray from their album Floored, which reached No. 1 on the Billboard Hot 100 Airplay chart and remained there for four weeks. He collaborated with India.Arie on her hit song "Video" in 2001, and with Jadakiss and The Neptunes on "The Don of Dons" in 2003. Later in 2003, he collaborated with 112 for their song "Na Na Na Na." Following the death of his longtime road manager Fred 'The Thunder' Donner in 2004, Super Cat released a multi-CD tribute album, Reggaematic Diamond All-Stars that featured contributions from Yami Bolo, Michael Prophet, Linval Thompson, Nadine Sutherland and Sizzla among others. In 2007, Super Cat headlined the Reggae Breeze concert in Japan with the Wild Apache Band.

Super Cat reappeared on the national reggae scene in 2008 for a show at Madison Square Garden with Buju Banton and Barrington Levy. He also headlined the 'Best of the Best' concert in Miami later that year, with Etana, Barrington Levy, Buju Banton, Junior Reid, Tony Matterhorn, Sizzla and Beenie Man. In 2012, his song "Dance Inna New York" was sampled for the Nas single "The Don," from the rapper's album Life Is Good, with Cat's vocals used as the hook. Super Cat made a surprise appearance at Massive B's on Da Reggae Tip concert in September 2013 during the set of Shaggy. That same week, a mix of his work previously recorded during his time with The Neptunes label was released to the internet.

In May 2014 he headlined the Reggae on the Bay festival in Trinidad with Maxi Priest and Midnite, and in 2016 he joined Beenie Man, Bounty Killer, Tarrus Riley and Luciano for the "Reggae Sumfest" in Jamaica. Super Cat teamed up with noted producer Salaam Remi again in 2020, releasing the single "Push Time," along with a music video shot in Queens, and later featured on Remi's album Black on Purpose. In 2021, Super Cat appeared at the VERZUZ Iconz concert in Brooklyn at the Barclay's Center dubbed the "Trillerverz," as part of a two-day event that featured Wyclef Jean, Konshens, Baby Cham, and Barrington Levy on day one and Big Daddy Kane and KRS-One on day two. Super Cat co-headlined the "Reggae Love Fest" at Radio City Music Hall with Shabba Ranks in May 2022, which also featured Barrington Levy, Junior Reid, Cutty Ranks, and Dawn Penn. In 2023, Super Cat performed at Reggae To The East in Canada and the following year at the Reggae Love Fest with Shabba Ranks and Capelton at the Barclays Center in Brooklyn, NY. Super Cat proved he is still a force to be reckoned with on the 10th anniversary Welcome to Jamrock Reggae Cruise (WTJRC) in 2025, where he shared the stage with Damian "Jr. Gong" Marley and the legendary Stone Love.

Super Cat is the elder brother of reggae artist Junior Cat and first cousin of reggae singer Marcia Griffiths, whose 1967 hit "Feel Like Jumping", was part of the rhythmic basis for his first hit single "Boops", which later became known as the "Boops" riddim.

== Discography ==
=== Albums ===
- Si Boops Deh! (1985), Techniques
- Boops! (1986), Nick Crompton
- Sweets for My Sweet (1988), Wild Apache
- Cabin Stabbin (1991), Wild Apache—with Nicodemus & Junior Demus
- Don Dada (1992), Columbia/SME
- Good, the Bad, the Ugly & the Crazy (1994), Columbia/SME—with Nicodemus, Junior Demus and Junior Cat
- The Struggle Continues (1995), Columbia/SME
- Take 2 (2003), Columbia/SME—with Mad Cobra
- Reggaematic Diamond All-Stars (2004), Wild Apache

=== Charted singles ===
List of charted singles as lead artists, with selected chart positions
Title	Year	Peak chart positions				
Title	Year	UK	AUS	BEL (FL)	BEL (WA)	NZ
"It Fe Done"	1992	66	—	—	—	—
"My Girl Josephine" (featuring Jack Radics)	1995	22	26	33	40	6
"Girlstown"	1995	66	—	—	—	33

=== DVD ===
- Pick of the Past Keeling Reggae – with Nicodemus, Junior Demus, Louie Rankin, and Nick Crompton
