= Emperor Faith =

Emperor Faith was an early Jamaican sound system from the Red Hills Area of Kingston, Jamaica, one of the most popular sounds of the early 1970s. The sound was run by Mikey Faith, who was Bob Marley's accountant. Emperor Faith worked with producers such as Clive Chin. They occupied the corner of Rosemary Lane and Tower Street and often performed in the house of Roy Anthony Johnson.
