= Billy Boyo =

- Born: Billy Rowe; 21 September 1971
- Origin: Kingston, Jamaica
- Died: 29 October 2000 (aged 29)
- Genres: DJ Toasting (Jamaican music), Dancehall, Roots reggae, Reggae, Dub
- Instrument: Vocals
- Years active: 1980–2000
- Website: https://greensleevesrecords.co.uk/artist/billy-boyo/

Billy Boyo (born Billy Theophilus Rowe, 21 September 1971 – 29 October 2000) was a Jamaican reggae artist born in Kingston, Jamaica, who was arguably the most prolific of the early-1980s child DJs. He is best known for his songs "One Spliff a Day" and "Billy Boyo in the Area".

== Biography ==
Billy Boyo was still in his teens when he emerged in the early 1980s. In 1983, he (together with Little John and Ranking Toyan) went to London where he linked up with producer Silver Kamel.

Along with the above noted "One Spliff a Day", Boyo also charted in 1982 with the Scientist (musician) engineered and Henry Junjo Lawes-produced single, "Wicked She Wicked", backed by Roots Radics.

Boyo was relatively prolific in the early stages of his recording career, releasing a number of Discomix Roots Radics-backed and Scientist-engineered vocal and dub 12" singles in a comparatively short period from the early to mid 1980s, many on the Greensleeves Records label, yet he only released one sound-clash styled album in his career when alive, mixed by Errol Thompson (audio engineer), and thus was arguably more well known at the time as a live MC. Throughout the early to mid-1980s, Billy Boyo recorded with some of the most respected and best selling conscious Roots Reggae vocalists and chanters of the period, amongst them Don Carlos, Dennis Walks, Linval Thompson, MC Toaster Sammy Dread and Anthony Johnson (musician) as well as featuring on popular releases by the then ascending Dancehall oriented mic chanters of the day, namely, Little John (musician). Billy Boyo's musical career was short-lived and little was heard of him after the late 1980s, and Boyo died of a brain tumour on 29 October 2000, after a two-month-long struggle.

== Discography ==
- DJ Clash Vol. 2 (Little Harry & Billy Boyo; 1983)
- Zim Zim (2002)

Compilations

- DJ Clash: 3 the Hard Way (Little Harry & Billy Boyo & Nicodemus; 2008)
