= Anthony Johnson (musician) =

Jamaican reggae musician (born 1957)

- Born: Roy Anthony Johnson; 25 December 1957 (age 68)
- Origin: Kingston, Jamaica
- Genres: Reggae
- Instrument: vocals
- Years active: Late 1970s–present
- Labels: Midnight Rock, Live & Learn
- Formerly of: Mystic I

Roy Anthony Johnson (born 25 December 1957), better known simply as Anthony Johnson, is a Jamaican reggae musician who was a member of the group Mystic I and is known for the 1980s hit song "Gunshot".

== Biography ==
Johnson was born in Kingston, Jamaica in 1957. His mother, Cynthia Hamilton, was a market woman by trade, and his father was a Barbadian who worked as a waiter at the Sombero Club in Kingston. Anthony's parents had three children together before separating. They also had other children separately, so Johnson has several siblings.

Johnson was raised by his mother in a tenement yard in the heart of Trench Town. Biah's yard at 15½ James Street is significant in Johnson's development as an artist and musician. This yard, owned by an Indian who had moved to Kingston from Cuba, doubled as a popular dance hall on weekends and holidays. Some of the big sound systems of the era, including King Tubby's, played at dances in Biah's yard. Many of the top Jamaican singers of the time were also from Trench Town, and Johnson took inspiration from the likes of John Holt, Dennis Brown, and Alton Ellis, regularly visiting the latter's yard in nearby White Street. When political violence escalated in Kingston, Johnson moved away to Montego Bay, where he stayed with Ellis's younger brother Irving. While there sang with Irving's steel band, which performed at local hotels. When Johnson moved back south, he lived in Portmore, where he befriended the actor/comedian Carl Bradshaw, and played in Bradshaw's backing band.

In the mid-1970s, Johnson began auditioning at Kingston's studios, along with his friend Horace Grassett (better known as Badoo). His first recording was "Free Black Man" for producer Bunny Lee, although this was not released; Lee did, however, suggest that Johnson drop 'Roy' from his name, and he has performed as Anthony Johnson since. He went on to record for the Hoo Kim brothers at Channel One Studios, and was sufficiently successful that he could buy a guitar. Johnson spent a lot of time at the Rasta camp on Selassie Drive, where he met Les Clarke and Balvin Finals, with whom he formed the vocal trio Mystic I. They recorded several tracks with Linval Thompson, which he released without their knowledge as the album Mysterious in the UK in 1979. Tracks from those sessions were also released in 2009 by Johnson on the Perilous Time Showcase album. The group then recorded three tracks for Lee "Scratch" Perry at his Black Ark studio, with "Forward With Jah Orthodox" released by Perry as a single on his Black Art label. Ongoing solo, he recorded for several of the top Jamaican producers, most at Channel One Studios, including Linval Thompson ("Africa", "Life is Not Easy"), Henry "Junjo" Lawes ("Let Go This One", "Now I Know"), and Harry J ("Follow Them Footsteps"), but had his greatest success working with Jah Thomas who produced his first big hit in 1982 with "Gunshot", which pleaded for a cessation of the so-called "shotta" mentality, and which has remained a perennial favorite with sound systems. The single was followed by an album of the same name. Johnson continued to record throughout the 1980s, working with Prince Jammy on the hit single "A Yah We Deh", and with Dillinger on the single "Too Much".

Johnson is well known in Jamaica and on the European reggae circuit. Since the late 1980s he has lived in the UK, where he worked with producers such as Jah Warrior, Rootsman, and Mike Brooks, and still performs all over Europe, especially with the French Band Positive Roots Band.

== Discography ==
=== Albums ===
- Gunshot (1982), Midnight Rock
- Reggae Feelings (1983), Vista Sounds – expanded version issued 1999, Culture Press
- I'm Ready (Showcase Style) (1983), Rusty International
- Reggae Feeling (1984), Live & Learn
- We Want More Lovin', Progressive
- A Yah We Deh (1985), Jammy's
- Rasta Brothers (1985), Dancefloor – with Don Carlos and Little John
- Robert French Meets Anthony Johnson (198?), Midnight Rock – with Robert Ffrench
- Togetherness (1996), House of Reggae – reissued (2001), Prestige
- Reggae Chronicles (2006), Hallmark
- Gun Shot: Extended Version (2007), Roots
- I'm The One, Teams
- Dancehall Victory (2010), Rupa Rupa records

With Mystic I

- Mysterious (1979), Burning Sounds
- Perilous Time Showcase (2009), Anthony Johnson Music

=== Singles ===
- "She Afi Come a Me" (1977), Grimm Ben
- "Africa" (1979), Strong Like Sampson
- "Africa We Want to Go" (1979), GG's
- "Hey Baby" (1980), Laser
- "Ice Cream" (1980), Laser
- "Life is Not Easy" (1980), Strong Like Sampson
- "Let Go This One" (1981), Greensleeves
- "Just Call Me Girl" (1981), Freedom Sounds – with Lee Van Cliff
- "Africans Must Be Free" (1982), Heartbeat
- "Dancehall Style" (1982), Corner Stone
- "Don't Let Me Down Girl" (1982), Heartbeat
- "Gunshot" (1982), Midnight Rock
- "Sound Clash" (1982), Midnight Rock
- "Too Much" (1982), Oak Sound
- "Baby Loving" (1983), Rusty International
- "Dreadlocks Fight" (1983), Rusty International
- "Now I Know" (1983), Greensleeves
- "I'll Never Fall in Love Again" (1984), Rusty International
- "Nah Lick Shot" (1984), Black Scorpio
- "Nice & Easy" (1984), Black Scorpio
- "Stop My Loving" (1984), Rusty International
- "Spend the Night With You" (1988), Heights
- "Gunshot 90's Remix" (1991), One Love
- "Aware of Love", Harry J
- "Come in the Lawn", Connection
- "Dance With Me", Midnight Rock
- "Every Time I Hear Music", Midnight Rock
- "Feel Like Dancing/Dance & Romance", Midnight Rock – with Jah Thomas
- "Follow Them Footsteps", Harry J
- "I Feel Good", Youth in Progress
- "I'm The One", Teams
- "Know The Truth", Black Zodiac
- "Lost Love", Black Symbolic
- "Loving a Woman", Midnight Rock
- "Move in Move Out", Explosion
- "My Girl", Duke of Earl
- "Nice Up the Dance", Jammy's
- "Say You Love Me", Connection
- "She's My Queen", Reggae Sting
- "Strictly Rub a Dub", Midnight Rock
- "Take Me to the Show", Midnight Rock
- "You I Love", Midnight Rock
- "Swinging Medley", Silver Kamel
- "True True Love", Jamaica Vices
- "Tribulation" (2009), Heartical
- "Concentration" (2007), Rupa Rupa Records

With Mystic I

- "Forward With Jah Orthodox" (1978), Black Art
- "Feeling Happy" (1978), 56 Hope Road – miscredited as 'Mystic M'
- "Shining Light" (1978), Black Rose – miscredited as 'Mystic Eyes'
