= Dolly My Baby =

Single by Super Cat

from the album Don Dada
- Released: January 7, 1993
- Recorded: 1992
- Genre: R&B, East Coast hip hop, reggae
- Length: 4:22 (album version); 3:56 (Extended mix)
- Label: Columbia
- Songwriters: Trevor Sparks, William Maragh, Herbie Hancock, Christopher Wallace
- Producers: 3rd Eye, Sean "Puffy" Combs, Trevor Sparks

Super Cat singles chronology
"Dolly My Baby" (1993)	"Alright" (1993)

Mary J. Blige singles chronology
"Reminisce" (1992)	"Dolly My Baby" (1993)	"Sweet Thing" (1993)

The Notorious B.I.G. singles chronology
"Dolly My Baby" (1993)	"Party and Bullshit" (1993)

Puff Daddy singles chronology
"Dolly My Baby" (1993)	"No Time" (1996)

"Dolly My Baby" is the title of a reggae/hip-hop song performed by Jamaican reggae/dancehall recording artist Super Cat released as a single in early 1993 (see 1993 in music). The original version of the song is featured on Super Cat's album Don Dada (1992). The song was a major success for Super Cat, reaching number 64 on the R&B singles chart and number 21 on both the rap and dance charts.

== Background ==
The original version of the song appears on Super Cat's album Don Dada, written and produced by fellow reggae artist Trevor Sparks, who provides a chorus as well as backing vocals and ad-libs to the song.

== Remix versions ==
The song's original version appears on Super Cat's album Don Dada, where Trevor Sparks, who co-wrote the song, also performs its chorus and backing vocals. There are two official remix versions to the song. The first remix version, entitled "Dolly My Baby (Hip Hop Mix)", features backing vocals by Mary J. Blige, and contains a sample of Herbie Hancock's "Watermelon Man" and Mountain's "Long Red".

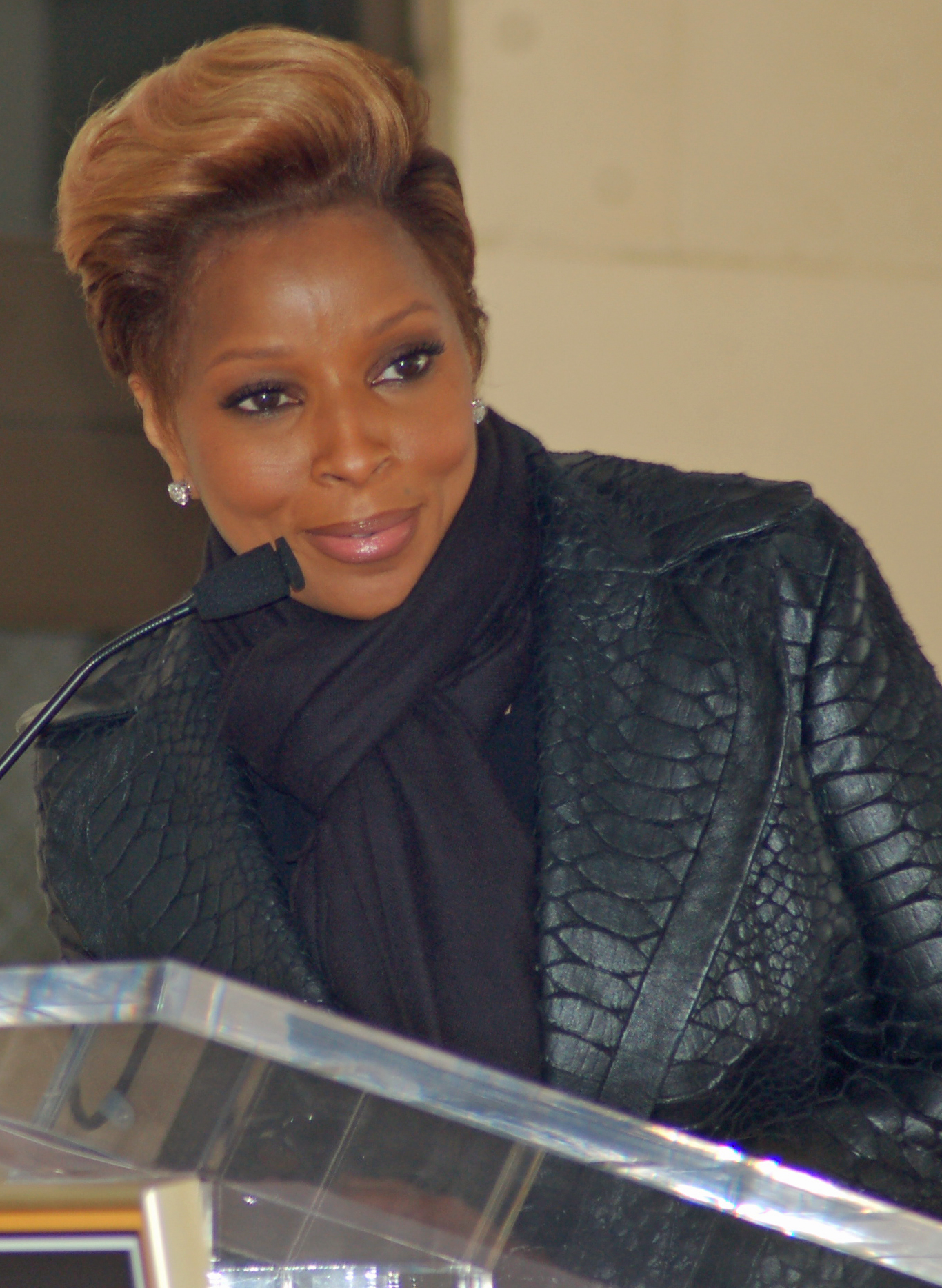
Mary J. Blige (pictured) performed backing vocals for the remix version.

The second remix version, titled "Dolly My Baby (Bad Boy Extended Mix)", is the same as the first remix version, only this time with guest vocals by co-remix producers Jesse West (under the alias 3rd Eye) and Sean Combs (under the alias Puff Daddy). In addition to Combs and West, the remix also marked the official recording debut of a then-unknown The Notorious B.I.G. (who was also known as "B.I.G." and "Biggie Smalls"). 3rd Eye's verse contained an interpolation of the traditional folk song "Ring a Ring of O' Roses" and in the "Bad Boy Extended Mix" version, he opens his verse with "bling bling. Who's that with Super Cat?". It has since been suggested that 3rd Eye was the first hip-hop artist to coin the complete term "bling bling." The original version contains a sample and an interpolation of Eric Donaldson's "Cherry Oh Baby", and B.I.G.'s verse included a sample of "Maddy Maddy Cry" by Papa San. This version is well known today.

=== Music video ===
The music video for the remix version of "Dolly My Baby" premiered in early 1993, where the video shows Super Cat performing the song in a nightclub, and Puff Daddy and 3rd Eye, with an early guest appearance by The Notorious B.I.G. performing their verses in what appears to be a diner. Mary J. Blige does not appear in the video.
