= Edi Fitzroy =

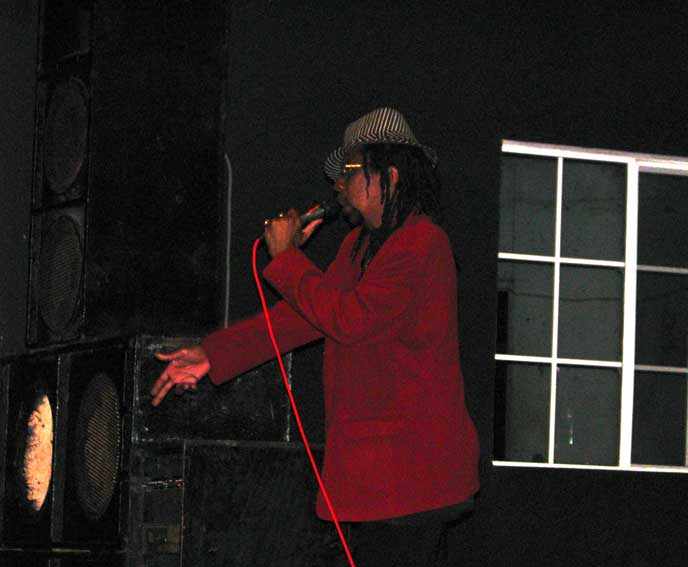
- Fitzroy performing in 2011

Background information
- Born: Fitzroy Edwards; 17 November 1955; Chapelton, Clarendon Parish, Jamaica
- Died: 4 March 2017 (aged 61) May Pen, Clarendon Parish, Jamaica
- Genres: Reggae
- Occupation: Singer/songwriter
- Years active: 1975–2017
- Labels: Musical Ambassador; Alligator; VP; RAS; Confidence

Fitzroy Edwards (17 November 1955 – 4 March 2017), better known by his stage name Edi Fitzroy, was a Jamaican reggae singer, active from 1975 but best known for his work during the dancehall era.

== Early life ==
Edwards was born on 17 November 1955 in Chapelton, Clarendon Parish, Jamaica, and attended Chapelton All-Age and Clarendon College. He was exposed to music from an early age via his father Vasco Edwards playing records for a sound system. After studying accounting at the West Indies Commercial Institute, he took a job as an accounts clerk with the Jamaica Broadcasting Corporation while also singing in his spare time. His recordings came to the attention of Mikey Dread, a radio presenter at the station, and with Dread's assistance he released his first single, "Miss Molly Colly", which was a top ten hit in Jamaica in 1978. Further hits followed and Fitzroy toured the United Kingdom with Dread in 1978, supporting The Clash.

== Career ==
In the early 1980s, Fitzroy worked with producers such as Lloyd Norris, and Trevor Elliot (who produced the singer's debut album Youthman Penitentiary (1982)). Check For You Once (1982) topped the Jamaican albums chart for four weeks. He performed at Reggae Sunsplash in 1984, returning in 1986, 1988, 1991, and 1993, and also performed at Sunsplash USA in 1988.

Fitzroy's lyrics led to him becoming renowned as one of Jamaica's most socially conscious singers, with themes including equality for women, and he won a Rockers Award in 1984 for Most Conscious Performer for his "Princess Black" single that celebrates black women (which he wrote for his mother). He enjoyed a major Jamaican hit with "The Gun", and he contributed to the "Land of Africa" charity single in aid of the Ethiopia famine appeal, along with Gregory Isaacs, Freddie McGregor and others, and Fitzroy became a director (along with Rita Marley, Judy Mowatt, Michael "Ibo" Cooper, and Orville Tyson) of the Music Is Life organization, with the aim of making a more lasting contribution toward's Africa's plight.

After the release of his 1993 album Deep in Mi Culture, Fitzroy toured the United States with backing band Massawa. In the mid-1990s he started his own Confidence label to release his own material. He has been a regular performer at annual Peter Tosh memorial concerts in Jamaica. Only in the mid-1990s did he give up his day-job to pursue music as a full-time career.

Although much of Fitzroy's work had been in an era when slack lyrics and digital rhythms have predominated, in the 1998 book Reggae Island he spelled out his preference for real musicians and "reality" lyrics:

I personally like the acoustic sound, which is, go in the studio and lay the tracks with your drummer and your bass player and, you know, support, percussionists. I personally as an artist still ... just paint it right within the people's minds, you know, to really tell them things, what is really happening, the realistic sense of life, seen?

== Personal life and death ==
Edi Fitzroy was a Rastafarian, stating that he has been "from birth". He died on 4 March 2017 in May Pen Hospital, aged 61.

== Discography ==
- Youthman Penitentiary (1982)
- Check For You Once (1982)
- Eclipse (1988)
- Deep in Mi Culture (1993)
- Pollution (1994)
- We a Lion (2000)
- Hold the Vibes (2006)
- First Class Citizen (2013)

Compilations

- Best of Edi Fitzroy: The Musical Ambassador Years (2008)
