= Ranking Trevor =

- Born: Maxwell Grant; 6 September 1959
- Died: 7 August 2012 (aged 52) Kingston, Jamaica
- Genres: Reggae, Dancehall, Conscious Roots Reggae, Dub, Toaster-DJ MC
- Years active: c.1974–2012
- Labels: Front Line, Cha Cha, Lord Koos, Black Roots

Maxwell Grant (20 January 1960 – 7 August 2012), better known as Ranking Trevor and sometimes as Ranking Superstar, was a Jamaican reggae deejay.

== Biography ==
Grant began deejaying as a teenager in the 1970s, and began his recording career at the age of fifteen. Regarded as a follower of U-Roy, Grant recorded at Channel One as Ranking Trevor in the mid-1970s, his first release being "Natty a Roots Man", and deejayed on the Socialist Roots sound system who were strongly aligned with the Jamaican People's National Party, instrumental in organising local communities and attempting to promote peace at a time when Jamaica was racked by political violence. He had success in 1977 with singles such as "Cave Man Skank" and "Three Piece Chicken and Chips" (a response to Trinity's "Three Piece Suit"), which were popular among British reggae fans, and these were followed by further hits on the British reggae charts in 1978 with "Pure & Clean" and "Rub a Dub Style" ( a toasting version of Cornell Campbell's "Queen of the Minstrel"), and he signed a record deal with Virgin Records' reggae label, Front Line, who released his debut album, In Fine Style. On the album, backed by The Revolutionaries, Ranking Trevor reworked Dennis Walks' "Drifter", Augustus Pablo and Jacob Miller's "Baby I Love You So", the Joe Frazier rhythm and The Abyssinians' Satta Massagana.

Channel One Studios' producer, Joseph Hoo Kim, followed this by releasing the Three Piece Chicken and Chips album, compiling tracks by Trevor and Trinity. Backed by The Revolutionaries' spacious Rockers' drum and bass mixes, Ranking Trevor and Trinity reworked toasting versions of Ernest Wilson (singer) conscious sound system favourite "I Know Myself" ( popular with Jah Shaka and Lloyd Coxsone sound systems in UK ), Coxsone Dodd's "The Answer" rhythm, "Have Mercy" by The Mighty Diamonds, and The Meditations hit, "Woman is Like a Shadow."

In 1977, Ranking Trevor teamed up with Carl Malcolm and The Revolutionaries to release the conscious Rockers Discomix, "Repatriation", backed by "Take a Tip From Me" on the "b" side, both tunes in demand with the followers of Jah Shaka and Lloyd Coxsone sound systems in England at the time, and released on Michael "Reuben" Campbell and King Sounds' Grove Music record label. In 1979 he recorded the Repatriation Time album with producer Linval Thompson, which was released the following year. He went on to work with Sugar Minott on the album Presenting Ranking Trevor, released in 1981 on Minott's Black Roots label. Ranking Trevor also recorded as part of a conscious roots harmony duo with King Everall called Natural Vibes, releasing vocal and dub excursion Discomix records like Be Wise and Can't Leave Jah with Johnny Osbourne and Dancehall artist Papa Tullo. Continuing popularity in the UK prompted his relocation to London in the mid-1980s, where he lived for more than twenty years before returning to Jamaica.

He died on 7 August 2012 from injuries sustained from a collision while riding his motorcycle in Kingston.

== Discography ==
=== Albums ===
- In Fine Style (1978), Front Line
- Three Piece Chicken and Chips (1978), Cha Cha
- Repatriation Time (1980), Lord Koos - credited as Ranking Superstar
- Presenting Ranking Trevor (1981), Black Roots

Compilations

- Roots of all Roots (198?), Micron - Ranking Trevor and Friends
