= The Blizzard of 78 =

American rock band

Blizzard of '78
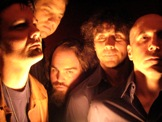

Background information
- Origin: Boston, MA; Providence, RI
- Genres: Alternative Rock, soul
- Past members: Pip; Nate Leavitt; Chris Cugini; Brian Syrjala; Paul Myers

The Blizzard of 78 is an American rock band from Boston and Providence. Consisting of ex-Delta Clutch members, they currently have two albums released; the first being the critically acclaimed Where All Life Hangs. Tanya Donelly contributed a guest vocal to the album, and it won several Motif awards in 2007. The Blizzard of 78 have played with, or opened for, Coldplay, Alex Chilton, Ronnie Spector, Snow Patrol, Jim Carroll, Tanya Donelly, Guster, Remy Zero and Throwing Muses. The group once performed The Replacements' album Tim in its entirety.

The band has won awards in The Providence Phoenix Best Music Poll, and has been a part of NEMO, WBCN Rock & Roll Rumble, Nashville NEA Extravaganza, and the mp3.com/Heineken Tour.

In May 2007 they had a song included on the tribute to the Clash's album Sandinista!, featuring Mikey Dread toasting on their track, "Silicone on Sapphire".

The Blizzard of 78 released their second full-length album, Book of Lies, on December 9, 2008. The Providence Phoenix again nominated the group for awards in two categories in their 2009 Best Music Poll, Best Act and Best Male Vocalist.
