= Lloyd Daley =

Jamaican record producer (1939–2018)

Lloyd Daley (12 July 1939 – 18 March 2018), also known as Lloyd's the Matador, was a Jamaican electronic technician, sound system pioneer, studio engineer and reggae record producer.

== Life and career ==
Daley was born in Kingston, Jamaica on 12 July 1939. He had success in the early reggae period on his Matador label with artists like Jackie Mittoo ("Dark of the Sun") or The Scorchers ("Ugly Man").

His biggest hit came out in 1969 with Little Roy and his Rasta song "Bongo Nyah", which became a long-time Jamaican number one. He then produced other popular singles for artists like The Abyssinians ("Yim Mas Gan") recorded 1969, The Ethiopians ("Owe Me No Pay Me"), Dennis Brown ("Things in Life")and ("Baby Don't do it"), The Wailing Souls ("Gold Digger"), the first recordings of The Gladiators ("Freedom Train", "Rockaman Soul"), Alton Ellis ("Back to Africa" and "Lord Deliver Us" another Jamaican hit), John Holt or The Paragons. In the book Reggae, The Rough Guide, reggae historiographer, archivist, curator and chronologist Steve Barrow commented that the releases "...superbly demonstrate how Jamaica's musical heritage should be presented".

Daley also released many instrumental tunes with Johnnie Moore or Lloyd Charmers ("Zylon" was a 1969 hit) and dee-jay versions of his hits with artists like U-Roy ("Sound of the Wise" and "Scandal", both recorded in October 1969). In 1971, Daley released Little Roy's "Hard Fighter" version, recorded by The Hippy Boys, and named "Voo-doo". It was one of the first instrumental dub tunes where drum and the bass had a dominating role.

Lloyd Daley died in Florida on 18 March 2018, at the age of 78.

== Discography ==
=== Compilation albums ===
- Various Artists – Scandal – Matador – LP
- Various Artists – Way Back When – Matador (1979) – LP
- Various Artists – Lloyd Daley's Matador Productions 1968–1972: Reggae Classics from the Originator – Heartbeat (1992)
- Various Artists – From Matador's Arena Vol 01: 1968–1969 – Jamaican Gold (1994)
- Various Artists – From Matador's Arena Vol 02: 1969–1970 – Jamaican Gold (1994)
- Various Artists – From Matador's Arena Vol 03: 1971–1979 – Jamaican Gold (1994)
- Various Artists – Shuffle 'n Ska Time With Lloyd 1960–1966 – Jamaican Gold (1995)

== See also ==
- List of Jamaican backing bands
- List of Jamaican record producers
