= Right Time =

Studio album by Mighty Diamonds
- Released: 1976
- Recorded: Channel One Studios, Kingston, Jamaica
- Genre: Reggae
- Label: Virgin
- Producer: Joseph Hoo Kim

Mighty Diamonds chronology
Right Time (1976)	Ice on Fire (1977)

Professional ratings
Review scores
Source	Rating
Allmusic	5/5 stars
Christgau's Record Guide	A−

Right Time is the 1976 studio album debut of influential reggae band the Mighty Diamonds. The album, released by Virgin Records after they signed the Mighty Diamonds following a search for talent in Jamaica, is critically regarded as a reggae classic, a landmark in the roots reggae subgenre. Several of the album's socially conscious songs were hits in the band's native Jamaica, with a few becoming successful in the UK underground. Influential and sometimes unconventional, the album helped secure the success of recording studio Channel One Studios, and rhythm team Sly Dunbar and Robbie Shakespeare.

== Background ==
The Mighty Diamonds were among the first artists signed to the Virgin record label after it entered the reggae music market. The Mighty Diamonds had been discovered by Jamaica's Channel One Studios, and when Virgin followed Island Records into the Jamaican marketplace, they, too, discovered The Mighty Diamonds. Virgin's representatives set up a table at a Sheraton Hotel with $100,000 and, after police intervention calmed the resultant excitement, left with such artists as the Mighty Diamonds, Prince Far I, Johnny Clarke and Big Youth on their roster. The album, the Mighty Diamonds' record debut, was recorded at Channel One Studios in Kingston, Jamaica, with production by Chinese Jamaican Joseph Hoo Kim, whose family owned the studio. 2006's Caribbean Popular Music notes that "[w]ith the release of ...Right Time in 1976, the studio came into its own."

== Critical reception ==
The album has been critically well received. In 1976 Rolling Stone described the album as "simply one of the finest reggae LPs ever released. In 1977, it called it "the finest stateside reggae release of last year." It has come to be regarded as a reggae classic, a landmark in the roots reggae subgenre. The album is listed by Pop Matters among the "Five Reggae Albums You Cannot Live Without", with reviewer Sean Murphy commenting that "Right Time manages to combine several styles and merge them in a seamless, practically flawless whole. This, to be certain, is roots reggae, yet at times it sounds like the most accessible soul music, closer to Motown than Trenchtown."

== Popular reception ==
At the time of the album's release, violence within the music industry in Jamaica had led to the banning of official record charts there, but according to Rolling Stone, the Mighty Diamonds were the second-most popular band in the country after Burning Spear. A number of the songs on the album were hits in Jamaica, and several of them were big in the UK underground. The title track, a "roots masterpiece" according to Allmusic, hit big in both places, although Virgin Records lacked the foresight to release the number as a single. "Shame and Pride" was also successful in both Jamaica and the UK. Other Jamaican hits on the album include "I Need a Roof" and "Africa" Rolling Stone suggested that if charts had been permitted, "the Diamonds' brilliant singles, like 'Right Time' and 'Have Mercy,' would have been on top all last winter."

== Songs ==
The music is succinctly described in 2000's World Music: The Rough Guide as "[a] fine selection of sweetly harmonised vocals, militant 'rockers' rhythms and Garveyite lyrics." Although the music is sometimes unconventional, the themes are typical of reggae, focusing on what critic Robert Christgau encapsulates as "broken bodies" and "the exultation of oppression defied." The album has a strong spiritual base, with multiple references to Jah and repeated exhortations to proper behavior.

Though several of the songs draw on ancient texts or historical events, they remain essentially oriented on the future. The song "Africa" is a relatively jaunty if wistful dream of repatriation that is more optimistic about the future return to Africa than mournful about the brutal separation from it. The "right time" referenced in the title track, the first song penned by the band itself, is the upcoming Apocalypse, with the band envisioning public response with lyrics that reference the Bible and the writings of Marcus Garvey.

The latter song features a particularly tricky drum beat, which drummer Sly Dunbar recalled in 2001's This is Reggae Music evoked both skepticism and imitation: "When that tune first come out, because of that double tap on the rim nobody believe it was me on the drums, they thought it was some sort of sound effect we was using. Then when it go to number 1 and stay there, everybody started trying for that style and it soon become established." According to the Independent, the entire album was "revolutionary", the breakthrough album of "masters of groove and propulsion" Dunbar and Robbie Shakespeare, with "Sly's radical drumming matching the singers' insurrectionary lyrics blow-for-blow."

Garvey, Jamaica's first national hero and a recurrent referent in Rastafarian music, doesn't only feature on "Right Time", but appears on several other songs on the album, establishing what would become a persistent theme in the Mighty Diamond's work. His words are utilized in "I Need a Roof", which draws together musical themes from "Right Time" and the traditional song "Ol' Man River" in a "bouncy yet moody" prayer for basic shelter, a "sufferation" classic that was penned in response to the rampant inflation in Jamaica at the time. "Them Never Love Poor Marcus" speaks directly of Garvey, castigating those who betrayed him.

Other songs focus heavily on proper modes of behavior. Track "Why Me Black Brother Why" explores black on black crime in Jamaica and warns that Jah will judge. The album's British single debut, "Have Mercy", is another religious appeal to Jah, described by 1998's Reggae Routes: The Story of Jamaican Music as "perhaps" the band's "best song." "Go Seek Your Rights" intermingles the expected message of requiring righteous treatment with an appeal to living righteously. On a similar theme, "Gnashing of Teeth" is another Apocalyptic song that warns that the only salvation is righteous behavior. Even the relationship song "Shame and Pride" focuses on righteous living as its narrator tries to keep his girlfriend from self-destruction.

== Track listing ==
All songs written by Lloyd Ferguson, Fitzroy Simpson, Donald Shaw and Joseph Hoo Kim, unless otherwise noted.

1. "Right Time" – 3:17
2. "Why Me Black Brother Why" (author unknown) – 3:10
3. "Shame and Pride" – 3:21
4. "Gnashing of Teeth" – 3:07
5. "Them Never Love Poor Marcus" – 2:44
6. "I Need a Roof" – 2:51
7. "Go Seek Your Rights" – 3:30
8. "Have Mercy" – 3:19
9. "Natural Natty" – 2:49
10. "Africa" (Ferguson) – 3:09

== Personnel ==
=== Performance ===
- Radcliffe "Rad" Bryan – guitar
- Tony Chin – guitar
- Ansel Collins – keyboards
- Anthony "Benbow" Creary – drums
- Sly Dunbar – drums
- Pat "Lloyd" Ferguson – vocals
- Vin Gordon – trombone
- Ossie Hibbert – keyboards
- Herman Marquis – alto saxophone
- Tommy McCook – tenor saxophone
- Ranchie – bass
- Robbie Shakespeare – bass
- Donald Shaw (aka Tabby Diamond) – vocals
- Fitzroy Simpson (aka Bunny Diamond) – harmony vocals
- Sticky – percussion
- Leroy "Horsemouth" Wallace – drums

=== Production ===
- Ossie Hibbert – engineer
- Ernest Hoo Kim – engineer
- Joseph Hoo Kim – record producer
- Dennis Morris – photography
- Lancelot "Maxie" McKenzie – engineer

== Sources ==
- Bradley, Lloyd (2001). This is Reggae Music: The Story of Jamaica's Music. Grove Press. ISBN 0-8021-3828-4.
- Moskowitz, David Vlado (2006). Caribbean Popular Music: An Encyclopedia of Reggae, Mento, Ska, Rock Steady, and Dancehall. Greenwood Publishing Group. ISBN 0-313-33158-8.
