= Socialist Roots Sound System =

Socialist Roots Hi-Fi was a prominent Jamaican reggae sound system and record label owned by Tony Welch (aka Papa Roots) in the 1970s and early 1980s. It was originally named King Attorney (and before that Soul Attorney). The name changed in 1976 when Welch bought the set. Regular deejays included Ranking Trevor, U Brown, Jah Mikey and Nicodemus, alongside the regular selector Danny Dreadlocks. They received dub cuts from Bob Marley & The Wailers. After 1981, the group was known as Papa Roots Hi-Fi.

The sound system was strongly aligned with the Jamaican People's National Party and was instrumental in organising local communities and attempting to promote peace at a time when Jamaica was racked by political violence. Socialist Roots record label released several records. The most successful was the vocal and dub discomix "Train to Zion", released in 1976, featuring U Brown and Linval Thompson. The peace song was one of the first 12" 45s issued in Jamaica.

Socialist Roots records were built on rhythm tracks provided by The Revolutionaries with Sly Dunbar on drums and Bertram "Ranchie" McLean on bass, artists who had contributed significantly to the momentum, originality, creativity and transformation of the new "rockers" style that would change the whole Jamaican sound (from roots reggae to rockers, and be imitated in all other productions). Beside Sly, many musicians played in the band: Robbie Shakespeare on bass, JoJo Hookim, Bertram McLean, and Radcliffe "Dougie" Bryan on guitar, Ossie Hibbert, Errol "Tarzan" Nelson, Robbie Lyn or Ansel Collins on keyboards, Uziah "Sticky" Thompson, Noel "Scully" Simms on percussion, Tommy McCook, Herman Marquis on saxophone, Bobby Ellis on trumpet and Vin Gordon on trombone.
