= Captain Sinbad =

Jamaican record producer and deejay

- Born: Carl Anthony Dwyer c.1955
- Origin: Kingston, Jamaica
- Genres: Reggae, dancehall
- Occupations: Deejay, record producer
- Years active: Late 1970s–present
- Labels: Greensleeves, Oak Sounds, CSA, Sinbad

Captain Sinbad was the deejay alter ego of Jamaican record producer Carl Anthony Dwyer (born c.1955).

== Biography ==
Dwyer was born in Kingston, Jamaica, and entered the music industry as a deejay under the name Captain Sinbad on the Sound of Silence sound system, which at the time also featured Sugar Minott, with whom he recorded the "Pressure Rock" single. Minott had been associated with Clement "Coxsone" Dodd's Studio One label and studio for some years and took Dwyer there to record. Although he recorded two songs at Studio One, they were not released. He then worked with Henry "Junjo" Lawes, and also began working as a producer himself, beginning with Little John's "A1 Sound". He also recorded for Dillinger's Oak Sound label, these recordings compiled on the Again album in 1983. Although he recorded for several producers, including Minott and Linval Thompson, his debut album release was the Lawes-produced The Seven Voyages of Captain Sinbad (1982). This was followed in 1983 with a collaboration with Peter Metro and Little John on Sinbad and the Metric System.

Around 1982/83 he relocated to England, where he worked with the Saxon sound system and set up his own Rockfort label, on which he released his own productions of UK artists. In the late 1980s he returned to Jamaica and set up the Sinbad label, the debut release on which was "Wickedest Thing in Life" by Gospel Fish. Other artists he produced included Capleton ("Two Minute Man"), Nerious Joseph, Mike Ninja, Mad Cobra ("Merciless bad Boy"), Daddy Woody, Frankie Paul ("Heart Attack") and General T.K.

In the early 1990s he began experimenting with hip hop, with remixes of his popular rhythms on the albums Sin Badda Than Them and Gangster. His productions in the 1990s included the Romantic ragga series of albums.

== Discography ==
- The Seven Voyages of Captain Sinbad (1982), Greensleeves
- Sinbad and the Metric System (1983), CSA – with Peter Metro and Little John
- Again (1983), Oak Sounds
- Reggae Music Will Mad Unu! (2013), Maximum Sound

Productions

- Sin-Bad A-Than-Them (1992), Sinbad
- Gangster (1992), Sinbad
- Romantic Ragga Volume 1 (1993), Sinbad
- Ambush (1993), Sinbad
- Romantic Ragga Volume 2 (1994), Sinbad
