= Beyond World War III =

Studio album by Mikey Dread
- Released: 1981
- Genre: Reggae, dub
- Label: Hearbeat
- Producer: Dread at the Controls

Mikey Dread chronology
World War III (1980)	Beyond World War III (1981)	Dub Catalogue Volume 1 (1982)

Beyond World War III is an album by the Jamaican musician Mikey Dread, released in 1981. It was the second album to be released by Heartbeat Records and is a slightly different version of 1980's World War III; it was picked up in America due to Dread's increased popularity after working with the Clash. Beyond World War III was reissued in 1997.

== Production ==
The album was produced by Dread. He was backed by members of the Roots Radics Band, including Style Scott on drums, Bingy Bunny on guitar, and Flabba Holt on bass. "The Jumping Master" praises the band as well as fellow producer Scientist, who mixed the album. "World War III" warns of a coming warfare apocalypse.

== Critical reception ==
Professional ratings
Review scores
Source	Rating
AllMusic	4/5 stars
Lincoln Journal Star	3.5/5 stars
MusicHound World: The Essential Album Guide	4/5 stars
Oakland Tribune	3/4 stars
Reggae & Caribbean Music	7/10
Rolling Stone	4/5 stars
The New Rolling Stone Record Guide	4/5 stars
Spin	8/10
The Virgin Encyclopedia of Reggae	2/5 stars

The Boston Globe said that "the excellent [Roots Radics Band] thumps out a deliberate riff and sticks to it, while Dread chant-sings along in his good-natured, slightly goofy way." The Lincoln Journal Star noted that, compared to Big Youth and Linton Kwesi Johnson, "Dread has the lightest sound and the catchiest beat". Rolling Stone praised the "echoing drums and bass" and "smooth yet biting vocals". The Oakland Tribune called "Israel (12 Tribe) Stylee" "easily one of the strongest dubs ever recorded".

In 1986, the Santa Cruz Sentinel deemed Beyond World War III "a classic reggae work." AllMusic said, "Dread's vocals are poised and self-assured; he sings when he feels like it, and lets his ping-ponging freestyle raps carry the track when he doesn't." Spin noted that Scientist had found "the Spike Jones in King Tubby." Peter Shapiro, in Modulations: A History of Electronic Music, called Beyond World War III a landmark "in the use of space and effects."

== Track listing ==
No.	Title	Length
1.	"Break Down the Walls"
2.	"Jah Jah Love (In the Morning)"
3.	"The Jumping Master"
4.	"Israel (12 Tribe) Stylee" (Extended Play)
5.	"Warrior Stylee" (Extended Stereo Style)
6.	"Money Dread"
7.	"Rockers Delight" (Extended Play)
8.	"Mental Slavery" (Extended Play)
9.	"World War III"
