= List of Jamaican backing bands =

This is a list of Jamaican backing bands.

== A ==
- Aggrovators (The)
- Amalgamated Allstars (The)
- Arabs (The)

== B ==
- Baba Brooks Band (The)
- Black Slate

== C ==
- Clue J & His Blues Blasters
- Crystalites (The)

== D ==
- Daley Allstars (The)
- Dynamites (The)
- Dragonaires (The)
- Duke Reid Group (The)

== G ==
- GG Allstars (The)
- Gladdy's All-Stars

== H ==
- Harry J Allstars (The)
- Hippy Boys (The)

== I ==
- Inner Circle

== J ==
- Jets (The)
- Joe Gibbs Allstars (The)

== M ==
- Matador Allstars (The)
- Mudies Allstars (The)
- Mystic Revelation Of Rastafari (The)

== P ==
- Phil Pratt Allstars (The)
- Professionals (The)
- Prince Buster Allstars (The)

== R ==
- Randy's Allstars (The)
- Revolutionaries (The)
- Rhythm Rulers (The)
- Roots Radics (The)
- Rupies Allstars (The)
- Rupie Edwards Allstars (The)

== S ==
- Skatalites (The)
- Sons Of Negus (The)
- Soul Brothers (The)
- Soul Syndicate (The)
- Soulettes (The)
- Soul Vendors (The)
- Sound Dimension (The)
- Studio One Orchestra (The)
- Supersonics (The)

== T ==
- Taxi Gang

== U ==
- Upsetters (The) 2

== W ==
- Wackies Rhythm Force (The)
- Wailers (The)

== Z ==
- Zap Pow
