= I-Roy =

Background information
- Born: Roy Samuel Reid; 28 June 1944; St. Thomas, Jamaica
- Died: 27 November 1999 (aged 55) Spanish Town, Jamaica
- Genres: Reggae, Conscious Roots Reggae, MC Toaster, Dub, Dancehall
- Years active: 1968–1990s
- Labels: Trojan Records, Front Line, Virgin

Roy Samuel Reid (28 June 1944 – 27 November 1999), better known as I-Roy, was a Jamaican deejay who had a very prolific career during the 1970s.

== Biography ==
Born in 1944 in Saint Thomas Parish, Jamaica, Reid graduated from Dinthill Technical College before starting his musical career via his Soul Bunny sound system in 1968, running it on Victoria Pier on Wednesday afternoons, while working during the day as a government accountant. He went on to work on the Spanish Town-based Son's Junior sound system, where he was spotted by producer Harry Mudie, who renamed him 'I-Roy'.

Deriving his name, and to some extent, his style from U-Roy, Reid was also heavily influenced in his early career by Dennis Alcapone. In 1971 he recorded four tracks for Mudie, all releases as singles, "The Drifter" and "Heart Don't Leap" (both in combination with Dennis Walks), "Let Me Tell You Boy" (over the Ebony Sisters' recording), and "Musical Pleasure". Reid and Mudie fell out over the details of a proposed European tour, and he went on to work on sound systems such as King Tubby's Home Town Hi-Fi, and recorded more material with many of the Island's top producers including Lloyd Campbell, Bunny Lee, Derrick Harriott, Lee "Scratch" Perry, Glen Brown, Rupie Edwards, Byron Lee, and Keith Hudson. One of I-Roy's hits was "Sidewalk Killer" (1972), a take on Tommy McCook's original "Sidewalk Doctor", produced by Ruddy Redwood. One of his most productive partnerships was with Gussie Clarke, who produced most of the tracks on his debut album, Presenting I Roy (1973), containing several hit singles recorded for the producer.

I-Roy's lyrics were often humorous, incorporating elements of songs and nursery rhymes.

Hit singles with "Buck and the Preacher" and "Monkey Fashion" were followed by a second album, the mainly self-produced Hell and Sorrow, which was sufficiently popular in the UK that Reid relocated there to promote his third album, The Many Moods of I-Roy (1974), performing regularly at the Roaring 20s club with Sir Coxsone's sound system, and playing live shows backed by Matumbi. He returned to Jamaica, where, with the popularity of DJ records waning, he worked as house producer at Channel One Studios, although his work was generally credited to the studio owners.

In 1975, he returned with several Channel One-produced singles, before working again with Bunny Lee in what would be one of the most successful periods of his career. For several years from 1975, I-Roy engaged in an on-record slanging match with fellow DJ Prince Jazzbo, the two trading insults on successive singles, starting with I-Roy's "Straight to Jazzbo's Head", although in reality they were good friends. In 1976, I-Roy signed to Virgin Records with whom he released five albums. Later in 1975 he released the Truth & Rights album, compiling many of his hits from that year.

In 1976, he was signed by Virgin Records, who went on to release eight albums via various subsidiary labels, mainly utilising backing tracks played by the Revolutionaries. He also released other material in Jamaica, including the Alvin Ranglin-produced Best of I-Roy album in 1977.

Reggae's move to the dancehall era in the 1980s saw I-Roy's popularity decline, along with the quality of his output. This decline in popularity and recurring health problems led to financial problems and periods of homelessness during the later period of his life. In the early 1990s he started building his own studio in Spanish Town, but it was never completed.

In October 1999, one of his two sons was killed in prison. On 27 November 1999 Reid died from heart failure in a Spanish Town hospital, at the age of 55.

Dub poet Linton Kwesi Johnson referred to I-Roy as "the mighty poet" in the track "Street 66" on the 1980 album Bass Culture.

He gained renewed attention when the song "Sidewalk Killer" was used in the 2004 video game Grand Theft Auto: San Andreas in the radio station called K-Jah West Radio.

== Discography ==
=== Studio albums ===
- Presenting I Roy (1973), Gussie/Trojan
- Hell and Sorrow (1974), Trojan
- Many Moods of I Roy (1974), Trojan
- Truths & Rights (1975), Grounation
- Step Forward Youth (1975), Live & Love - with Prince Jazzbo
- Can't Conquer Rasta (1976), Justice
- Crisus Time (1976), Caroline/Virgin
- Dread Baldhead (1976), Klik
- Ten Commandments (1977), Micron
- Heart of a Lion (1977), Front Line
- Musical Shark Attack (4 Feb 1977), Front Line
- The Godfather (1977), Third World
- The General (1977), Front Line
- World on Fire (1978), also released as “Word Magic” Front Line
- Cancer (1979), Virgin
- African Herbsman (1979), Joe Gibbs
- Hotter Yatta (1980), Harry J
- Whap'n Bap'n (1980), Virgin - produced by Dennis Bovell
- I Roy's Doctor Fish (1981), Imperial - also issued as The President (19??), Gorgon
- Outer Limits (1983), Hawkeye
- We Chat You Rock (1987), Trojan - with Jah Woosh
- The Lyrics Man (1990), Witty's
- Head To Head Clash (1990), Ujama - with Prince Jazzbo
- Sound System Anthology (1993), King's Music

=== Compilations ===
- The Best Of (1977), GG's
- Don't Check Me with No Lightweight Stuff (1997), Blood and Fire
- Touting I Self (2001), Heartbeat
- The Observer Book of I-Roy (2011), 17 North Parade
- Anthology 1969-1990 (2012), Attack

== See also ==
- List of reggae musicians
