= Little John (musician) =

Jamaican dancehall musician

- Born: John McMorris; 30 March 1965; Kingston, Jamaica
- Origin: Kingston, Jamaica
- Genres: Reggae, Roots Reggae, Dub, Dancehall, Digital Reggae
- Occupation: Singer
- Years active: Late 1970s–present
- Website: www.facebook.com/littlejohn.mcmorris/

John McMorris (born March 30, 1965), better known as Little John, is a Jamaican dancehall musician best known for his 1980s recordings.

== Biography ==
Born March 30, 1965 in Kingston, Jamaica, Little John was so called as he began performing and recording at the age of nine. He first recorded for Captain Sinbad's Youth in Progress label (including debut single "51 Storm"), and is regarded by some as the first dancehall singer, known for his ability to create lyrics over any backing track. Throughout the 1980s, he was backed by Roots Radics and Sly and Robbie, with frequent discomix vocal and dubwise production duties performed by protégé of King Tubby Hopeton Overton Brown, better known as Scientist (musician). After joining Sugar Minott's Youth Promotion organisation, he performed with sound systems such as Romantic Hi Fi, ( notably, also the name of Little John's own record label) Kilimanjaro, Gemini, and Henry "Junjo" Lawes' Volcano Hi Power. He recorded for many producers in the 1980s, notably for Lawes, Joseph Hoo Kim, George Phang, Jah Thomas and King Jammy, also gaining an audience amongst the followers of Jah Shaka sound system due to the popularity of the Dubplate discomix cuts of his spiritually conscious composition The More we are Together, also known as Praising his Majesty.

Little John's distinctive vocal styling had a significant influence on the emerging digital reggae scene of the mid 1980s, an influence that extended into the early Ragga, Jungle Music and drum and bass scenes in London in the early to mid 1990s. He performed at Reggae Sumfest in 2010, where he paid tribute to Sugar Minott. In 2025, Little John collected the rare digital roots reggae, ragga and dancehall discomix tunes from his own Romantic 45 record label onto a retrospective, comprehensive compilation entitled Various : In The Mood, Little John’s Romantic Label 1986-1990. The album features discomix versions of The Abyssinians' Declaration of Rights tune as well as showcase vocal performances from Frankie Paul, Early B and other foundation roots digital artists from the mid to late 1980s.

== Discography ==
- Janet Sinclair (single, 1982), Greensleeves Records – with Billy Boyo
- Reggae Dance (1982), Midnight Rock
- Showdown vol. 1 (1984), Empire/Hitbound – with Barry Brown
- English Woman (1983), Gorgon
- Ghetto Youth (1983), Jah Guidance – reissued (1990), RAS
- Give the Youth a Try (1983), Live & Learn
- Show Case 83 (1983), EAD
- Showdown vol. 6 (1984), Hitbound – with Frankie Paul
- True Confession (1984), Power House
- Unite (1984), Vista Sounds
- Clarks Booty (1985), Live & Love
- River to the Bank (1985), Power House
- The Best of Little John (1985), RM
- Worries and Trouble (1985), Black Scorpio
- Rubber Dub One (1986), C&E
- Youth of Today (1986), Skengdon
- Dance Hall Clash (1986), Sunset – with Uglyman
- Warriors & Trouble (1986), World Enterprise
- Showcase Volume 1 (198?), Sir Tommy's – with Trevor Junior
- Boombastic (1990), Heartbeat - produced by Winston Holness
- Build Back Yard (2006), Johnhouse

Compilations

- Early Days (1984), Jah Bible
- Various : In The Mood, Little John’s Romantic Label 1986-1990. ( 2025 )
