= Don Dada (album) =

Studio album by Super Cat
- Released: 1992
- Genre: Dancehall
- Label: Columbia

Super Cat chronology
Cabin Stabbin (1991)	Don Dada (1992)	Good, the Bad, the Ugly & the Crazy (1994)

Don Dada is an album by the Jamaican musician Super Cat, released in 1992. It was his first album for a major label, and also one of the first dancehall albums for a major label. The album title refers to Super Cat's nickname.

The album peaked at No. 37 on Billboard's Top R&B Albums chart. Super Cat promoted it with North American and Japanese tours.

== Production ==
"Nuff Man a Dead" first appeared on the Dancehall Reggaespanol compilation. Heavy D rapped on "Them No Worry We". It was Super Cat's intention to record an album that appealed to both a Jamaican dancehall audience and an American hip hop audience.

== Critical reception ==
Professional ratings
Review scores
Source	Rating
AllMusic	4.5/5 stars
The Encyclopedia of Popular Music	2/5 stars
MusicHound World: The Essential Album Guide	3.5/5 stars

The Milwaukee Sentinel wrote: "Mixing the latest dancehall styles with phrasing reminiscent of pioneers such as U Roy, I Roy, Big Youth and Dillinger, Super Cat makes some of the most refreshing (and interesting) Jamaican dance music in a long time." Newsday called the album "a bracing collection of tough rhythms, tougher lyrics and a pocketful of contradictions." The Times concluded that, "in much the same way that rap glories in its tuneless, declamatory style of vocalese, so the hardcore dance-hall style reduces reggae almost entirely to rhythm and rhyme; all harangue and no harmony."

USA Today determined that "the rapid-fire rapper serves up equal measures of social conscience and disco fever"; the paper later listed Don Dada as the eighth best R&B album of 1992. The Philadelphia Inquirer deemed the album "a deft mixture of rapping and singing supported by intelligent and not overly repetitive tracks."

AllMusic wrote that "the recurring ability of the songs to consistently provide a simple groove for Super Cat to fervently rap over the top of is amazing, and the virtuosity with which he can constantly provide the necessary vocal concoctions is noteworthy."

== Track listing ==
No.	Title	Length
1.	"Them No Worry We" (with Heavy D)
2.	"Ghetto Red Hot"
3.	"Them No Care"
4.	"Dolly My Baby" (with Trevor Sparks)
5.	"Don't Test"
6.	"Must Be Bright"
7.	"Don Dada"
8.	"Think Me Come fi Play"
9.	"Big and Ready" (with Heavy D and Frankie Paul)
10.	"Coke Don"
11.	"Nuff Man a Dead"
12.	"Oh It's You"
13.	"Fight fi Power"
14.	"Yush Talk"
