= Menelik Nesta Gibbons =

South African - Zimbabwean hip hop artist

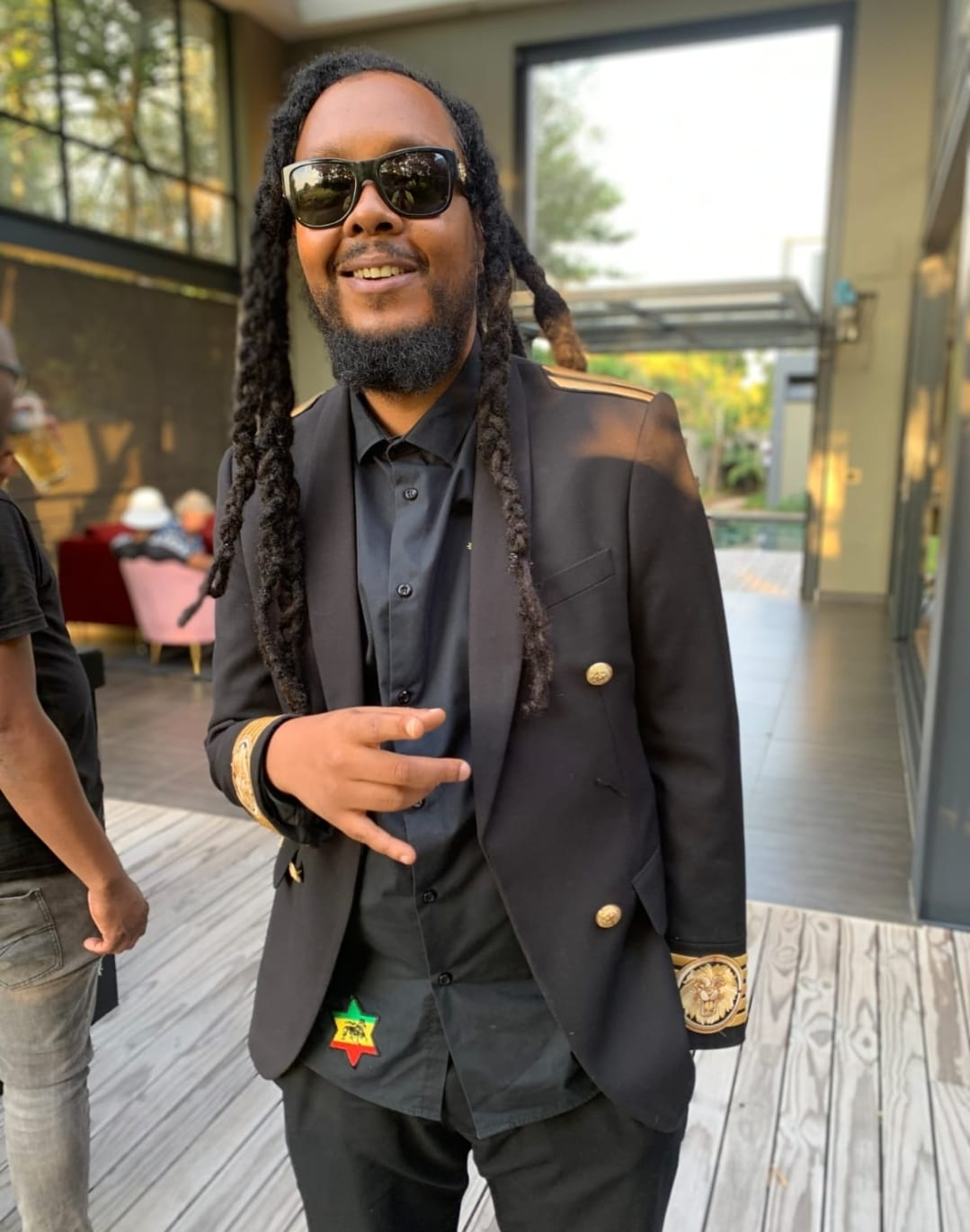

Background information
- Born: 3 April 1987 (age 38) Harare, Zimbabwe
- Website: dondadamusic.com

Menelik Nesta Gibbons (born on the 3rd April 1987), known professionally as Don Dada is a Zimbabwean-born South African hip hop & reggae artist, record producer, entrepreneur, radio personality, disc jockey, founder and co-owner of Ruff Cutt Studio and Afrika Connect Holdings situated in Johannesburg, South Africa.

== Early life and career ==
Menelik was born in Harare, Zimbabwe to his parents Layla and Moses Michael Gibbons and was raised in Johannesburg, South Africa. The Zimbabwean-South African born Menelik Nesta gibbons was named after Menelik I the first Emperor of Ethiopia, and Nesta, after Robert Nesta Marley.

Menelik was raised in Johannesburg, South Africa where he began his musical career in the year 2000, forming Ruff Cutt Studio in 2009 and releasing his debut album Avant-Garde in 2016. He made his debut on the 2016 Mandela Day Concert stage after releasing this album.
