= Robert Ffrench =

- Born: c. 1962
- Origin: Kingston, Jamaica
- Genres: Reggae
- Occupations: Singer-songwriter, record producer
- Years active: 1979–present

Robert Ffrench (born c. 1962) is a Jamaican reggae singer and record producer.

== Biography ==
Robert Ffrench grew up in central Kingston and attended Kingston College. He recorded his first singles in 1979, at the age of 17. He achieved success in 1984 with his performances at the Festival Song Contest and the Reggae Sunsplash festival. He had a combination hit with deejay Clement Irie with "Bun & Cheese", and his first two albums were released in 1985. He had another hit in 1989 with "Modern Girl", a collaboration with Courtney Melody. In the mid-1990s he relocated to New York City, where he teamed up with rapper Heavy D, with whom he had a hit with "More Love", with an album following on Ras Records, featuring collaboration with several artists including Lady G and General Degree. He has since returned to Jamaica, where he runs the Ffrench record label and distribution company, and more recently set up the Sing Jock label with Horace Davis. He released the album Yesterday and Today in 2001, collecting many of his earlier singles. After a period of inactivity as a recording artist, he returned in 2009 with the single "I Do".

As a producer he has worked with artists such as Dennis Brown, Buju Banton (he produced Buju's first single, "The Ruler"), Beres Hammond, George Nooks, Luciano, Jah Cure, and Sizzla.

Ffrench is a cousin of Rocksteady singer ( from The Techniques ) and foundation sound engineer Pat Kelly.

== Discography ==
- The Favourite (1985), Black Solidarity
- Wondering (1985), Blue Mountain
- Reggae for the World (1986), Scar Face – with Frankie Paul
- Mr. French Showcase (198?), Progressive
- Showcase, Abraham
- Robert French Meets Anthony Johnson (198?), Midnight Rock – with Anthony Johnson
- Robert Ffrench, Heavy D and Friends (1995), RAS – with Heavy D
- Yesterday and Today (2001)
