= Mighty Diamonds =

Jamaican harmony trio

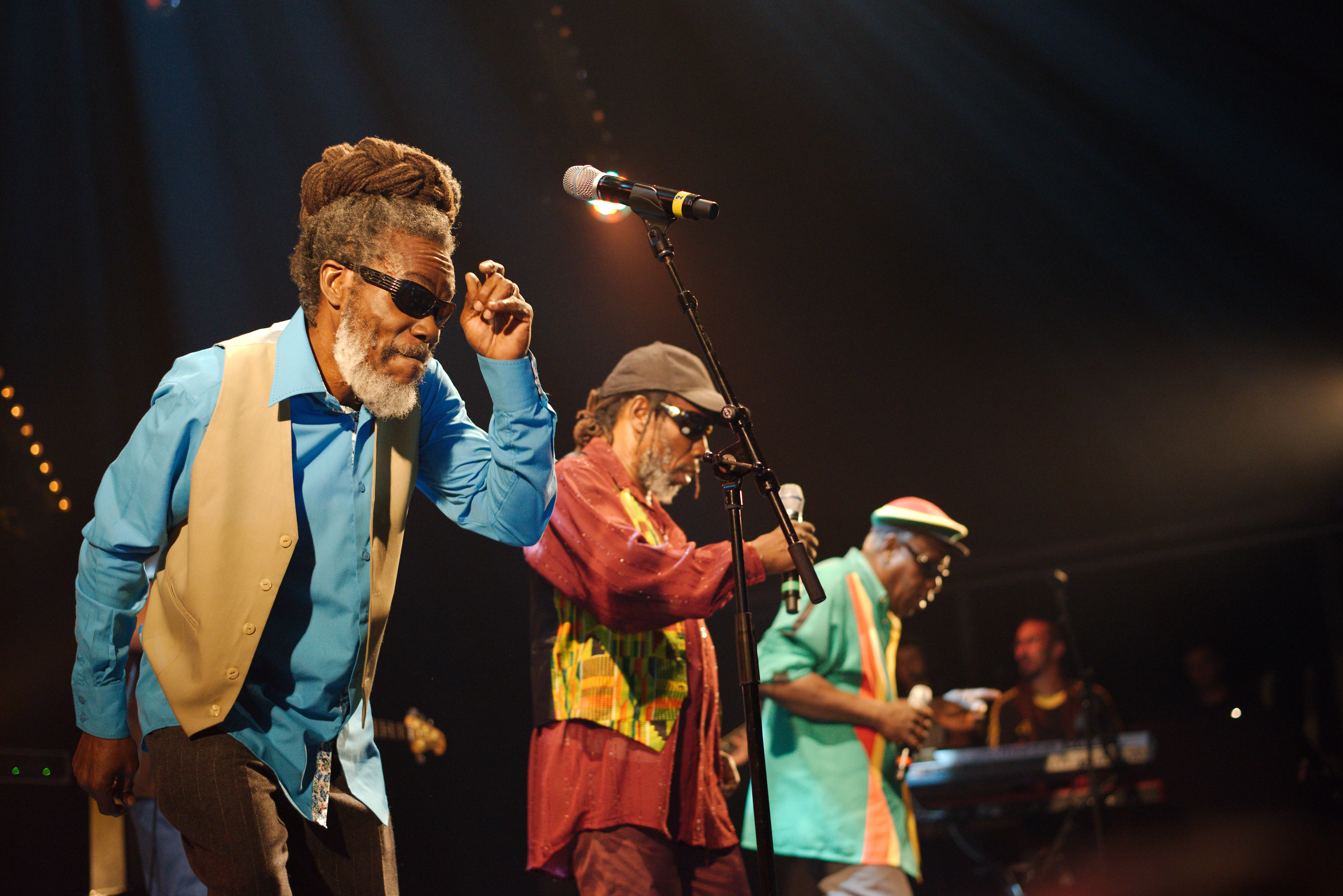

Background information
- Origin: Kingston, Jamaica
- Genre: Roots reggae
- Years active: 1969–2022
- Label: Free World Music
- Past members: Lloyd "Judge" Ferguson; Donald "Tabby" Shaw; Fitzroy "Bunny" Simpson
- Website: https://www.youtube.com/@themightydiamondsofficial/about

The Mighty Diamonds were a Jamaican harmony trio, recording roots reggae with a strong Rastafari influence. The group was formed in 1969 and were best known for their 1976 debut album, Right Time, produced by Joseph Hoo Kim, and the 1979 release, Deeper Roots.

On March 29, 2022, their lead singer, Donald "Tabby" Shaw, was shot dead in a drive-by shooting. On April 1, 2022, Fitzroy "Bunny" Simpson died. They disbanded shortly afterwards.

== History ==
Formed in 1969 in the Trenchtown area of Kingston, the group comprised lead vocalist Donald "Tabby" Shaw, and harmony vocalists Fitzroy "Bunny" Simpson and Lloyd "Judge" Ferguson. They had become friends at school in the mid-1960s, and were originally called The Limelight, adopting 'Mighty Diamonds' after Shaw's mother started referring to them as "The Diamonds". Their smooth harmonies and choreographed stage show were inspired by Motown vocal groups of the 1960s, with Shaw listing The Temptations, The Stylistics, The Impressions, and The Delfonics as influences as well as Jamaican rocksteady artists such as John Holt and Ken Boothe.

Their early recordings were produced by Pat Francis, Stranger Cole ("Girl You Are Too Young" (1970), "Oh No Baby"), Derrick Harriott ("Mash Up"), Bunny Lee ("Jah Jah Bless the Dreadlocks", "Carefree Girl"), Lee "Scratch" Perry ("Talk About It"), and Rupie Edwards, but it was in 1973 that they had their first hit single with the Francis-produced "Shame and Pride", recorded at the Dynamic Sounds studio. It was their mid-1970s work with producer Joseph Hoo Kim that gave them their real breakthrough. "Country Living" and "Hey Girl" were recorded and released by the Channel One label. "Right Time" followed, on Hoo Kim's Well Charge label, and cemented their status as one of the top Jamaican groups of the time.

Virgin Records signed them and the group's début album, Right Time, was released in 1976, including most of their early Channel One hits. The album was an international success and for the follow-up, Virgin sent them to work with Allen Toussaint in New Orleans, with local musicians providing the backing. The resulting Ice on Fire album sold poorly, the production not appealing to reggae fans, and the album later described as "an attempt by New Orleans soul musicians to play reggae".

Back in Jamaica, they continued to record for Channel One, with the Stand Up to Your Judgment album released in 1978, and continued to produce a string of hit singles. They also released records on their own 'Bad Gong' label. The group's Deeper Roots, released in 1979, was their next big album success, again released by Virgin, on its Front Line label.

In 1978, The Mighty Diamonds made a brief cameo in the film Rockers, directed by Ted Bafaloukos.

In the early 1980s, they recorded with producer Gussie Clarke, largely using old Studio One tracks as the basis for their recordings, and dubplates of these sessions became popular on sound systems in Jamaica, New York, and London, particularly "Pass the Kouchie", recorded on the "Full Up" riddim. Their work with Clarke produced the 1981 album Changes.

"Pass the Kouchie", written by Ferguson and Simpson, became an international hit twice, when first released (on their 1982 album Changes) and again when it was covered by Musical Youth with the lyrics altered to remove the drug references, and released as "Pass the Dutchie" (1982).

Their performance at Reggae Sunsplash in 1982 was released on an album later that year, paired with the performance from Mutabaruka.

The group continued to release albums regularly, adapting successfully to the prevailing digital rhythms of the 1980s and beyond. Tabby, Bunny and Judge issued over 40 albums in their long career.

In 2021, the group was honoured with the Order of Distinction (Officer Class) in the National Honours and Awards, on the occasion of Jamaica's 59th Anniversary of Independence.

On 29 March 2022, Donald “Tabby” Shaw was shot dead, along with one other person, on McKinley Crescent in St Andrew, Kingston, Jamaica. Three others were injured in the shooting. The following Friday, 1 April, co-singer with the group, Fitzroy "Bunny" Simpson died whilst in an undisclosed Kingston hospital.

== Discography ==
=== Studio albums ===
- Right Time (1976), Free World Music
- Ice on Fire (1977), Free World Music
- Planet Mars Dub (1978), Front Line – The Icebreakers and the Diamonds, dub version of Planet Earth
- Stand Up to Your Judgment (1978), Channel One
- Tell Me What's Wrong (1978), Hit Bound
- Planet Earth (1978), Virgin
- Deeper Roots (1979), Free World Music
- Deeper Roots Dub (1979)
- Changes (1981), Music Works
- Dubwise (1981), Music Works – six dub versions from Changes and four other dubs
- Reggae Street (1981), Free World Music
- The Roots Is There (1982), Music Works/Shanachie
- Indestructible (1982), Alligator (similar to the album Changes with two extra songs)
- Heads of Government (1982), Jah Guidance
- Leaders of Black Countries (Showcase Album) (1983), Mobiliser
- Backstage (1983), Music Works
- Kouchie Vibes (1984), Burning Sounds
- Diamonds Are Forever (1984), Woorell Japan – Eight songs exclusive to Japan plus two singles
- Pass the Kouchie (1985), Free World Music
- Struggling (1985), Free World Music
- If You Looking for Trouble (1986), Live & Learn
- The Real Enemy (1987), Greensleeves
- Never Get Weary (1988), Live & Learn
- Get Ready (1988), Rohit International/Greensleeves
- Ready for the World (1989), Overheat Japan – Eight songs exclusive to Japan plus two singles
- Jam Session (Remastered), Free World Music
- Tour the World (1991) – contains five new songs and five old songs
- Patience (1991), Free World Music
- The Moment of Truth (1992), Free World Music
- Bust Out (1993), Free World Music
- Paint It Red (1993), Free World Music
- Speak the Truth (1994), Free World Music
- Stand Up (1998), Gone Clear
- Rise Up (2001), Free World Music
- Thugs in the Streets (2006), Nocturne
- Inna De Yard (2008), Makasound – acoustic versions of classic songs performed with nyabinghi drums

=== Collaborations and split albums ===
- Vital Dub Strictly Rockers (aka: Vital Dub – Well Charged) (1976) – includes five dub versions from the Right Time album
- Trinity Meet the Mighty Diamonds (1979), Gorgon
- Disco Showcase (1979), Gussie Roots Sounds – Leroy Smart feat. The Mighty Diamonds
- Right Time Rockers (The Lost Album) (1998) – recorded in 1976, U-Roy deejaying on the riddims from the Right Time album

=== Compilations ===
- Vital Selection (1981), Virgin – 1976–1979 Joseph Hoo Kim produced material
- Ebony and Ivory (1983), Woorell – Japanese compilation of Augustus Clark productions
- Go Seek Your Rights (1990), Front Line – 1976–1979 Joseph Hoo Kim produced material
- Mighty Diamonds Meet Don Carlos & Gold at Channel One Studios (1993), Channel One – includes the complete Right Time album
- Paint It Red (1993), RAS – compilation of singles from 1985 to 1990, overdubbed with new instruments
- Works (1994), JVC/Victor – 1981–1988 Augustus Clarke material
- From the Foundation (1996), Gone Clear – The Mighty Diamonds & The Tamlins, 1978–1981 Augustus Clarke material
- Heads of Government (1996), Germain – Donovan Germain-produced material, different from the 1983 album
- Maximum Replay (1997) – 1981–1988 Augustus Clarke material
- The Best of the Mighty Diamonds: 20 Hits (1997) – contains two full albums: Stand Up to Your Judgment and Tell Me What's Wrong
- RAS Portrait (1997), RAS – recordings from 1993 to 1994
- Right Time Come (1998) – includes the complete Right Time album and nine songs from 1978
- Indestructible: Anthology Volume 1 (1999)
- Natural Natty Reggae (2000), Simon – compilation of singles produced by Bunny Diamonds between 1976 and 1997
- The Classics Recordings of Jamaica's Finest Vocal Trio (2000), Music Club
- Gold Collection (2000), Grayland
- Everlasting: 30th Anniversary (2000), D-3
- Rise Up (2001), Jet Star
- Unconquerable (2003), Reggae Road
- Revolution (2003), NYC Music
- The Best of the Mighty Diamonds (2004), Seymour – features two albums: Pass the Kouchie and Tour the World
- Back2Back: Tamlins & Mighty Diamonds (2007)
- Reggae Legends (2008), VP – four-CD boxset that contains the four albums issued on Greensleeves: The Real Enemy, Get Ready, Live in Europe and Bust Out
- Kings of Reggae (2009), Nocturne – material issued on RAS records in 1993–1994
- Leaders of Black Countries (2011), Kingston Sounds

=== Live albums ===
- Live in Tokyo (1985)
- Live in Europe (1989)
- Live at Reggae Sunsplash (1992), Genes – recorded in August 1982, eight songs from Mighty Diamonds and seven songs from Mutabaruka
- The Best of Reggae Live (2001) – Frankie Paul & Mighty Diamonds
- Live in Europe: Nice, France (2002) – recorded in 1997
