= Jah Thomas =

Nkrumah Manley Thomas
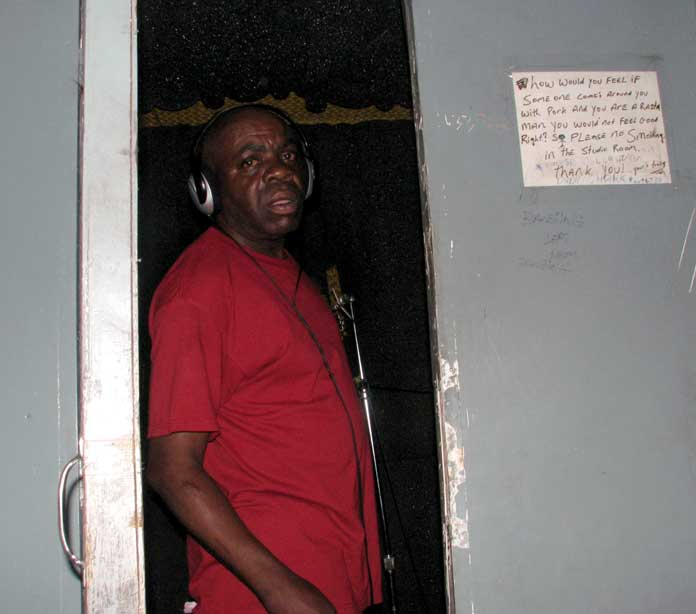

Background information
- Born: 17 August 1955 (age 70)
- Origin: Kingston, Jamaica
- Genres: Reggae
- Instruments: Vocals, Producer
- Years active: 1970s to present

Nkrumah "Jah" Thomas (born 1955, Kingston, Jamaica) is a reggae deejay and record producer who first came to prominence in the 1970s, later setting up his own Midnight Rock and Nura labels.

== Biography ==
Named Nkrumah after Ghanaian nationalist leader Kwame Nkrumah, he adopted the stage name Jah Thomas and began deejaying in the mid-1970s, working with producers such as Alvin Ranglin, who released his single "Midnight Rock", which topped the Jamaican chart in 1976. Thomas's debut album, Stop Yuh Loafin' gained international recognition via a release on the newly formed Greensleeves Records label. Further deejay albums appeared in the late 1970s, before Thomas began concentrating on producing other artists, that included: Robert Ffrench, Anthony Johnson, Triston Palma, Johnny Osbourne, Michael Palmer, Barry Brown, Barrington Levy, Sugar Minott, Early B, Ranking Toyan, and Robin Hood, at the same time setting up the Midnight Rock record label, one of the most successful performer-owned labels of the period. Midnight Rock soon had a hit record in the shape of Thomas's "Cricket Lovely Cricket". Thomas would often use the mixing talents of Scientist, and the Roots Radics band. He later also set up the Nura label.

He is the father of reggae singer Da'Ville and singer/producer Dwight Thomas.

== Discography ==
- Stop Yuh Loafin' (1978) Greensleeves
- Dance on the Corner (1979) Midnight Rock
- Nah Fight Over Woman (1980) Tad's
- Black Ash Dub (1980) Trojan (with The Revolutionaries)
- Tribute to the Reggae King (1981) Midnight Rock
- Dance Hall Connection (1982) Silver Camel
- Dance Hall Stylee (1982) Daddy Kool/Silver Camel
- Shoulder Move (1983) Midnight Rock
- Jah Thomas Meets Scientist in Dub Conference (1996) Munich
- Triston Palmer Meets Jah Thomas in Discostyle (1996) Munich
- Jah Thomas Meets King Tubby Inna Roots of Dub (1997) Rhino
- Jah Thomas Meets The Roots Radics Dubbing (1999) Trojan
- Jah Thomas meets Barrington Levy inna Dancehall Style Culture Press
- King Tubby's Hidden Treasure(1999) Trojan (Jah Thomas & The Roots Radics)
- Lyrics For Sale Rhino
- Prophecy of Dub Abraham (Jah Thomas & The Roots Radics)
- Jah Thomas Meets King Tubby in the House of Dub Majestic Reggae
- Roots Dancehall Party (2003) Silver Kamel
- Big Dance A Keep (2005) Silver Kamel
- Big Dance Dub (2005) Silver Kamel
- Liquid Brass (2005) Silver Kamel
- Jah Thomas Presents... (2007) Ras Sta Reggae
- Jah Thomas Meets... (2007) Ras Sta Reggae
- Jah Thomas Meets... (2021) Dub of Dubs
