= Henry "Junjo" Lawes =

- Junjo in 1980

Background information
- Origin: Kingston, Jamaica
- Died: 14 June 1999
- Genres: Reggae, dub, dancehall
- Occupations: Producer, sound engineer
- Labels: Volcano, Greensleeves Records

Henry "Junjo" Lawes (born 1947 or 48 in Kingston, Jamaica, died 14 June 1999 in London, England) was a highly influential Jamaican record producer and sound engineer.

== Biography ==
Born in the Waterhouse district of Kingston, Jamaica, Lawes began working as a producer in the late 1970s. He worked with many reggae, dancehall and dub artists such as Linval Thompson, Scientist, Toyan, Barrington Levy, Little John, Don Carlos, Frankie Paul and most importantly with Yellowman, all for his record label Volcano, which spawned a popular sound system of the same name. He used the Roots Radics as his regular studio band.

Lawes served a prison term in the United States after being convicted of drug-related charges in the mid-1980s.

He later worked with Beenie Man and Ninjaman.

On 14 June 1999, he was shot dead in a drive-by shooting in Harlesden, northwest London. The case remains unsolved.

== See also ==
- List of Jamaican record producers
