= Joseph Hoo Kim =

Jamaican reggae producer (1942–2018)

- Born: 10 December 1942
- Origin: Kingston, Jamaica
- Died: 20 September 2018 (aged 75); New York, United States
- Genres: Reggae
- Occupation: Record producer
- Years active: Early 1970s–mid-1980s
- Labels: Channel One, Well Charge, Hitbound

Joseph "Jo Jo" Hoo Kim (10 December 1942 – 20 September 2018) was a Jamaican reggae record producer best known for his productions in the 1970s at his Channel One Studios.

== Career ==
Born to parents of Chinese heritage, Joseph Hoo Kim grew up in the Maxfield Avenue area of Kingston. He was the oldest of four brothers (to Ernest, Paul and Kenneth), who during the 1960s were involved in the jukebox and slot machine industry. In 1970, after the Jamaican government declared the gambling games illegal, Joseph and Ernest decided to turn to the music business and launched a sound-system named Channel One. In 1972, impressed by the rootsy style of producer Bunny Lee, Joseph decided to set up the Channel One Studios on Maxfield Avenue (West Kingston). Working on a four-track machine, Syd Bucknor became Lee's first sound engineer. One year later he was replaced by Joseph's brother Ernest. By this time they also had their own pressing plant and label-printing workshop. To gain experience, Hoo Kim decided to give every volunteer producer a free try. Working alongside the Hookims was the deejay I-Roy.

Though they produced some strong records (Don't Give Up the Fight by Stranger & Gladdy — their first production, I Dig You, Baby by Alton Ellis, and Leroy Smart's Blackman), they did not meet with success until the mid-1970s. The studio used a house band, the Revolutionaries, from 1975, based around drummer Sly Dunbar and bassist Robbie Shakespeare, and a rotating line-up of other players which included keyboard player Ansel Collins, and saxophonist Tommy McCook. Dunbar developed the studio's sound by initiating a clapping snare drum beat under certain bass notes, then moving flying cymbals on by doubling rim shots, playing a major role in developing the roots-heavy sound soon to be called "rockers".

Channel One's biggest commercial success, "Right Time", by The Mighty Diamonds, was released in 1975, and included on the group's 1976's Hoo Kim-produced album of the same name. However, many other big names came to record in the studio: Leroy Smart, Delroy Wilson, Black Uhuru, Horace Andy, John Holt, Junior Byles, The Wailing Souls, and Dillinger, were a few of them. Among the many labels they created were Well Charge, Channel One, and Hitbound. Greensleeves, Island and Virgin Records have all distributed their productions at one time or another.

Hoo Kim was the first producer to introduce the re-use of old Studio One rhythms for new productions. Though a very controversial practice in the beginning, it eventually became widespread, and laid the foundation for the early dancehall sound. In 1976, he brought out the first mix combining versions sung and DJed on the same single with "Truly" by The Jays and Ranking Trevor, a standard for the dancehall culture in the 1980s. This record was also the first Jamaican 12-inch single.

Entering a depression after his brother Paul was shot to death during a robbery in 1977, Joseph Hoo Kim's productions became less numerous. At this time, he left Jamaica to escape the violence on the island and established himself professionally in New York. Then in 1979, he renovated his Jamaican studio and began returning there every month to supervise new productions. With Ernest, he opened a subsidiary studio in New York in the early 1980s where many DJs recorded. Among them were Barrington Levy and Barry Brown. In the early 1980s, he launched the "Showdown series" with "clash" albums where each face of an LP was dedicated to one of two dueling DJs. When the dancehall entered the digital era, he withdrew from the Jamaican music business, shut down both studios and settled in New York permanently.

He later operated a pressing plant in Brooklyn.

Hoo Kim died on 20 September 2018 in New York, aged 76, after suffering from liver cancer.

== Discography ==
- Various Artists – 1983 – General For All General: Dance Hall Style – Hitbound
- Various Artists – 1984 – Hypocrite Inna Dance Hall Style – Hitbound
- Various Artists – 1984 – Sly & Robbie Presents The Unmetered Taxi – Channel One
- Various Artists – Special Request To All Bad Boys – Hitbound
- Various Artists – Special Request To All Lovers Boys & Girls – Hitbound
- Various Artists – 1976–1979 – Hit Bound: The Revolutionary Sound Of Channel One – Heartbeat Records (1989)
- Various Artists – 1974–1978 – Channel One Well Charged – Pressure Sounds (1997)
- Various Artists – When The Dances Were Changing (Hitbound Selection) – Pressure Sounds (1998)
- Various Artists – Channel One Story (Reggae Anthology) I Shot The Deputy – VP Records (2004)

== Sources ==
- Barrow, Steve & Dalton, Peter (2004). The Rough Guide to Reggae (3rd ed.). Rough Guides. ISBN 1-84353-329-4.
- Katz, David (2003). Solid Foundation – An Oral history of Reggae. Bloomsburry, UK. ISBN 1-58234-143-5.
