= Prince Jazzbo =

- Born: Linval Roy Carter; 3 September 1951; Clarendon Parish, Jamaica
- Died: 11 September 2013 (aged 62) Homestead, St. Catherine Parish, Jamaica
- Genre: Reggae
- Years active: Early 1970s–2013
- Label: Ujama

Linval Roy Carter (3 September 1951 – 11 September 2013), better known as Prince Jazzbo, was a Jamaican reggae and dancehall deejay and producer.

== Career ==
Born in Clarendon Parish, Jamaica, and raised in Kingston, Linval Roy Carter (who would become known professionally as Prince Jazzbo) began his career with sound systems such as The Whip in Spanish Town. He began recording with Coxsone Dodd's Studio One label in the early 1970s under the name Prince Jazzbo, and also recorded for Glen Brown and Lee "Scratch" Perry. He went on to work on his own releases with Bunny Lee, producing as well in collaboration with many artists as a vocalist and producer for labels including his own, Ujama. The Perry-produced album Super Ape featured Jazzbo toasting on "Croaking Lizard". Jazzbo and fellow toaster I-Roy had a well reported, but friendly and mutually beneficial on-record clash during 1975, including the cuts "Straight to Jazzbo's Head" from I-Roy and the retort, "Straight to I-Roy's Head" from Prince Jazzbo.

Prince Jazzbo's early work with Clement "Coxsone" Dodd at Studio One produced several hits in 1972–1974 including: "School", "Fool For Love" and "Imperial I". His first hit in 1972 with Coxsone though was a version of Horace Andy's "Skylarking", which he re-worked as "Crabwalking". He ran the Ujama record label for many years. His very last message to the world and testament tune is known as 'All Haffi Bow' on a Ujama style riddim cut produced by AIRPUFF Records on 6 September 2013.

== Death ==
Carter died on 11 September 2013, aged 62, of lung cancer.
