= Lorna Goodison =

Jamaican poet and writer (born 1947)

Lorna Goodison CD
- Born: Lorna Gaye Goodison; 1 August 1947 (age 79); Kingston, Colony of Jamaica, British Empire
- Education: St. Hugh's High School; Jamaica School of Art; Art Students League of New York
- Occupations: Poet; essayist; memoirist; painter
- Known for: Poet Laureate of Jamaica (2017–2020)
- Notable work: I Am Becoming My Mother (1986); From Harvey River (2007); Oracabessa (2013)
- Relatives: Barbara Gloudon (sister)
- Awards: Commonwealth Writers' Prize, 1982; Musgrave Gold Medal, 1999; British Columbia's National Award for Canadian Non-Fiction, 2008; Order of Distinction, 2013; OCM Bocas Prize for Poetry, 2014; Windham–Campbell Literature Prize, 2018; Queen's Gold Medal for Poetry, 2019; American Academy of Arts & Sciences, 2020

Lorna Gaye Goodison CD (born 1 August 1947) is a Jamaican poet, essayist and memoirist, a West Indian writer, whose career spans four decades. She is now professor emerita, English Language and Literature/Afroamerican and African Studies at the University of Michigan, previously serving as the Lemuel A. Johnson Professor of English and African and Afroamerican Studies. She was appointed Poet Laureate of Jamaica in 2017 (succeeding Mervyn Morris), serving in the role until 2020.

Goodison's 1986 book of poems, I Am Becoming My Mother, won the Commonwealth Writers' Prize, and her 2013 volume, Oracabessa, won the OCM Bocas Prize for Poetry. In addition to poetry, Goodison has published collections of short stories and essays, as well as the memoir From Harvey River: A Memoir of My Mother and Her Island, which in 2008 was the recipient of one of Canada's largest literary prizes, British Columbia's National Award for Canadian Non-Fiction, and in May 2009 was featured on BBC Radio 4's Book of the Week.

In 2019, Goodison was awarded the Queen's Gold Medal for Poetry.

== Biography ==
=== Early years ===
Lorna Gaye Goodison was born in Kingston, Jamaica, on 1 August 1947, her birthday coinciding with Emancipation Day. She was one of nine siblings (who include the award-winning journalist Barbara Gloudon). Goodison was educated at St. Hugh's High School, an Anglican high school in Jamaica, and studied at the Jamaica School of Art, before going on to the Art Students League of New York, where she studied under African-American painter Jacob Lawrence.

As well as painting, Goodison has written poetry since her teenage years, some of her early poems appearing anonymously in the Jamaica Gleaner. She has described poetry as "a dominating, intrusive tyrant. It's something I have to do – a wicked force". She states that Derek Walcott was a major influence on her writing. She has spoken of how Dante and his Divine Comedy impacted on her work, and has said: "I didn't choose poetry—it chose me."

In her 20s, back in Jamaica, Goodison taught art and worked in advertising and public relations before pursuing a career as a professional writer. She began to publish under her own name in the Jamaica Journal, and to give readings.

In the early 1990s, Goodison began teaching part of the year at various North American universities, including at the University of Toronto and at the University of Michigan, where she was the Lemuel A. Johnson Professor of English and African and Afroamerican Studies. and is now professor emerita. In 2019, she was appointed Writer-in-Residence in the Department of Literatures in English, University of the West Indies, Mona campus.

=== Writing ===
Goodison's first book to be published was the 1980 volume of poems Tamarind Season. Tamarind Season was followed in 1986 by I Am Becoming My Mother, for which Goodison received the Commonwealth Writers' Prize for the Americas. Her subsequent poetry collections include Heartease (1988), Poems (1989), Selected Poems (1992), To Us, All Flowers Are Roses (1995), Turn Thanks (1999), Guinea Woman (2000), Travelling Mercies (2001), Controlling the Silver (2005), Goldengrove (2006), Oracabessa (2013) and Supplying Salt and Light (2013). Oracabessa, described as "a book of risky journeys, mappings and re-mappings through Spain, Portugal, Canada and her homeland of Jamaica as the poet navigates place, history and imagination", won the Poetry category of the 2014 OCM Bocas Prize for Caribbean Literature, when the judges stated: "In Oracabessa the distinctive voice of Lorna Goodison–an elegant, captivating fusion of international English and Jamaican Creole–presents segments of autobiography as a series of travels. Goodison's persuasive art is a many-sided celebration of spiritual search."

Her 2021 poetry collection, Mother Muse, was reviewed in The Guardian by Ben Wilkinson, who wrote: "Her writing is often a celebration of the spirit and tenacity of women; in various ways, Mother Muse ... extends this feature of her work." Mother Muse "orbits around two important 'mother' figures in Jamaican music: Sister Mary Ignatius, the nun who ran Kingston's Alpha Boys School, celebrated for nurturing musical talent; and Anita 'Margarita' Mahfood, a celebrated dancer and lover of ill-fated musician Don Drummond — who was an Alpha Boys alumnus. Other poems contemplate, celebrate, and elegise woman ranging from the famous to the tragic to the unknown."

Goodison has also published three collections of short stories, Baby Mother and the King of Swords (1990), Fool-Fool Rose Is Leaving Labour-in-Vain Savannah (2005), and By Love Possessed (2012).

In 2008, her non-fiction book, From Harvey River: A Memoir of My Mother and Her Island – "a lyrical and luminous tale that spans several generations" – won British Columbia's National Award for Canadian Non-Fiction, Canada's largest prize for non-fiction. The memoir was featured on BBC Radio 4's Book of the Week in May 2009, read by Doña Croll. Lisa Fugard's review in The New York Times concluded: "Goodison's praise songs can be found in her many volumes of poetry and now in this loving memoir. It's a legacy that can be traced back to her infancy, when Goodison's mother dipped her finger in sugar and rubbed it under her daughter's tongue, ensuring her the gift of sweet speech." Goodison has said that during the dozen years it took her to write From Harvey River she drew inspiration from the work of John Keats, whom she first encountered studying the English Romantic poets on her Jamaican school syllabus.

Goodison's collection of essays, Redemption Ground: Essays and Adventures, was published in 2018 by Myriad Editions – "a gathering of people, voices, stories, and the fruits of great labor", as characterised by SX Salon, while the Montreal Review of Books stated that "Goodison's collection privileges moments of effervescence, where feelings are strong and some kind of revelation is just below the surface." The book featured in The Observer as one of "20 classic books by writers of colour", being chosen by Margaret Busby. Redemption Ground was published in Canada in 2023 by Véhicule Press.

Goodison's work has appeared widely in magazines, has been translated into many languages and over the past 25 years has been included in such anthologies as Daughters of Africa (1992), The Norton Anthology of Modern and Contemporary Poetry (2003), the HarperCollins World Reader, the Vintage Book of Contemporary World Poetry, the Norton Anthology of World Masterpieces, Longman Masters of British Literature (2006), and Poetry Unbound: 50 Poems to Open Your World (2022).

As poet and literary scholar Edward Baugh wrote in The Caribbean Review of Books: "...one of Goodison's achievements is that her poetry inscribes the Jamaican sensibility and culture on the text of the world, and that is no small achivevement." Together with issues of home and exile, her work addresses the power of art to explore and reconcile opposites and contradictions in the Caribbean historical experience. Kei Miller notes: "Primarily a poet, Goodison hasn’t been afraid of crossing the fence into other genres: she has written short stories and a much-celebrated memoir. ...I suspect she still isn't as celebrated as she really ought to be because there simply doesn't exist the perfect critical language to talk about what she is doing, the risks she is taking, and why exactly they succeed."

More than two decades in the making, Goodison's new translation and reimagining of Dante's Inferno – the first part of his 14th-century narrative poem Divine Comedy – was published in spring 2025, hailed by poet Kit Fan as "career-defining" and "epoch-making". The reviewer in the Montreal Review of Books described it as "a fascinating work: one that would appeal to those interested in Dante, the Caribbean, world literature, or translation, or simply those seeking to face the dread rising from the ground of the everyday." In the Literary Review of Canada, reviewer Randy Boyagoda notes: "To be sure, Goodison's Inferno ... is much more than just her conversation with Dante; it's also an extended reflection on her own artistic formation. And just as Dante chose Virgil as his guide, she chooses Louise Bennett-Coverley, a Jamaican poet and folklorist who, like the author, eventually settled in Canada. Led by 'Miss Lou,' Goodison’s narrator explores Jamaican culture and history, before and during and after colonization." In The Walrus magazine, Amanda Perry observes that "Goodison plants her flag in the territory of world literature", and Quill & Quire concludes its review by stating: "This Inferno is cosmic, deeply imagined, and memorable. ... here is a poet who speaks to and through troubled history, emerging unscathed from the many circles of hell, keeping intact a propulsive heart that beats to Caribbean rhythms. Lorna Goodison's retelling of Dante's Inferno is a celestial reckoning of epic proportions."

Dante's Inferno was a finalist for the Poetry category of the 2025 Governor General Literary Awards, as well as for the OCM Bocas Prize for Caribbean Literature in the Poetry category. Dante's Inferno won Goodison the 2026 Derek Walcott Prize for Poetry.

=== Other creative activity ===
Also an artist, Goodison has exhibited her paintings internationally, and her own artwork is usually featured on the covers of her books.

Since 2017, Goodison has worked with dub poet and martial arts trainer Cherry Natural (born Marcia Wedderburn) to host a series of summer workshops pairing poetry and self-defence for girls aged from nine to 17, held at the Institute of Jamaica.

== Personal life ==
One of nine siblings – including journalist, author, playwright Barbara Gloudon (1935–2022) – Goodison is married to author and retired English literature professor J. Edward (Ted) Chamberlin and they live in Halfmoon Bay, British Columbia, Canada.

== Recognition ==
In 2013, Goodison was awarded the Jamaican national honour of the Order of Distinction in the rank of Commander (CD), "for outstanding achievements in Literature and Poetry".

In 2015, Goodison was honoured by the University of Michigan with its Shirley Verrett Award; given to "a faculty member whose work encourages the advancement of women of color in the arts", the award was created in 2011 in tribute to former University professor and renowned opera singer Shirley Verrett.

In 2017, Goodison was invested as the second official poet laureate of Jamaica, after Mervyn Morris, becoming the first woman to hold the title. She marked her first Emancipation Day in the role with a poem "In Celebration of Emancipation", which commemorates the end of enslavement of African peoples in Jamaica. Goodison has said: "I don't think it is an accident that I was born on the first of August, and I don't think it was an accident that I was given the gift of poetry, so I take that to mean that I am to write about those people and their condition, and I will carry a burden about what they endured and how they prevailed until the day I die."

In 2018, Yale University announced Goodison as one of eight recipients of the Windham–Campbell Literature Prize, honouring writers for their literary achievement or promise and awarding them each a US$165,000 individual prize to support their writing.

In 2019, she was a recipient of the Queen's Gold Medal for Poetry, which was presented to her at Buckingham Palace in March 2020 (an occasion she subsequently wrote about in commemoration of the Queen's life for The Guardian).

In 2020, Goodison was elected to the American Academy of Arts and Sciences.

In 2022, she received an honorary doctorate (Doctor of Letters) from Durham University.

In 2023, Goodison was honoured as a Royal Society of Literature International Writer, an annual life-long award recognising the contribution of writers across the globe to literature.

== Awards ==
- 1986: Commonwealth Writers' Prize for the Americas, for I Am Becoming My Mother
- 1999: Musgrave Gold Medal by the Institute of Jamaica for contributions to literature
- 2004: Henry Russel Award from the University of Michigan
- 2008: British Columbia's National Award for Canadian Non-Fiction, for From Harvey River: A Memoir of My Mother and Her Island
- 2013: Jamaican Order of Distinction in the rank of Commander (CD)
- 2014: OCM Bocas Prize for Poetry, for Oracabessa
- 2015: Shirley Verrett Award from University of Michigan
- 2017–2020: Poet laureate of Jamaica
- 2018: Windham–Campbell Literature Prize
- 2019: Honorary doctorate from University of Toronto
- 2019: Queen's Gold Medal for Poetry
- 2020: American Academy of Arts and Sciences
- 2022: Honorary doctorate from Durham University
- 2023: Royal Society of Literature (RSL) International Writer
- 2026: Derek Walcott Prize for Poetry, for Dante's Inferno

== Bibliography ==
=== Poetry collections ===
- Tamarind Season (Institute of Jamaica, 1980)
- I Am Becoming My Mother (New Beacon Books, 1986, ISBN 978-0901241689; winner of Commonwealth Writers' Prize, Americas region)
- Heartease (New Beacon Books, 1988, ISBN 978-0901241870)
- Poems (Research Institute for the Study of Man/CommonWealth of Letters, 1989)
- Selected Poems (University of Michigan Press, 1992, ISBN 978-0472064939)
- To Us, All Flowers Are Roses (University of Illinois Press, 1995, ISBN 978-0252064593)
- Turn Thanks (University of Illinois Press, 1999, ISBN 978-9766371951)
- Guinea Woman: New and Selected Poems (Carcanet, 2000, ISBN 978-1857544862)
- Travelling Mercies (McClelland & Stewart, 2001, ISBN 978-0771033827)
- Controlling the Silver (University of Illinois Press, 2005, ISBN 978-0252072123)
- Goldengrove: New and Selected Poems (Carcanet, 2006, ISBN 978-1857548488)
- Oracabessa (Carcanet, 2013; ISBN 978-1847772428)
- Supplying Salt and Light (McClelland & Stewart, 2013; ISBN 978-0771035906)
- Collected Poems (2nd edition) (Carcanet, 2017, ISBN 9781784106386)
- Mother Muse (Carcanet, 2021, ISBN 9781800171060)
- Dante's Inferno (Carcanet, 2025, ISBN 9781800174665)

=== Short story collections ===
- Baby Mother and the King of Swords (Longman, 1990, ISBN 978-0582054929)
- Fool-Fool Rose Is Leaving Labour-in-Vain Savannah (Ian Randle Publishers, 2005, ISBN 978-9766371951)
- By Love Possessed (Amistad Press, 2012, ISBN 978-0062127358)

=== Memoir ===
- From Harvey River: A Memoir of My Mother and Her Island (McClelland & Stewart, 2007; Amistad, 2008; Atlantic Books, 2009, ISBN 978-1843549956)

=== Essay collection ===
- Redemption Ground: Essays and Adventures (UK: Myriad Editions, 2018, ISBN 978-1-912408-13-9; Canada: Véhicule Press, ISBN 9781550656213).
