= Hurricane Melissa =

Category 5 Atlantic hurricane in 2025

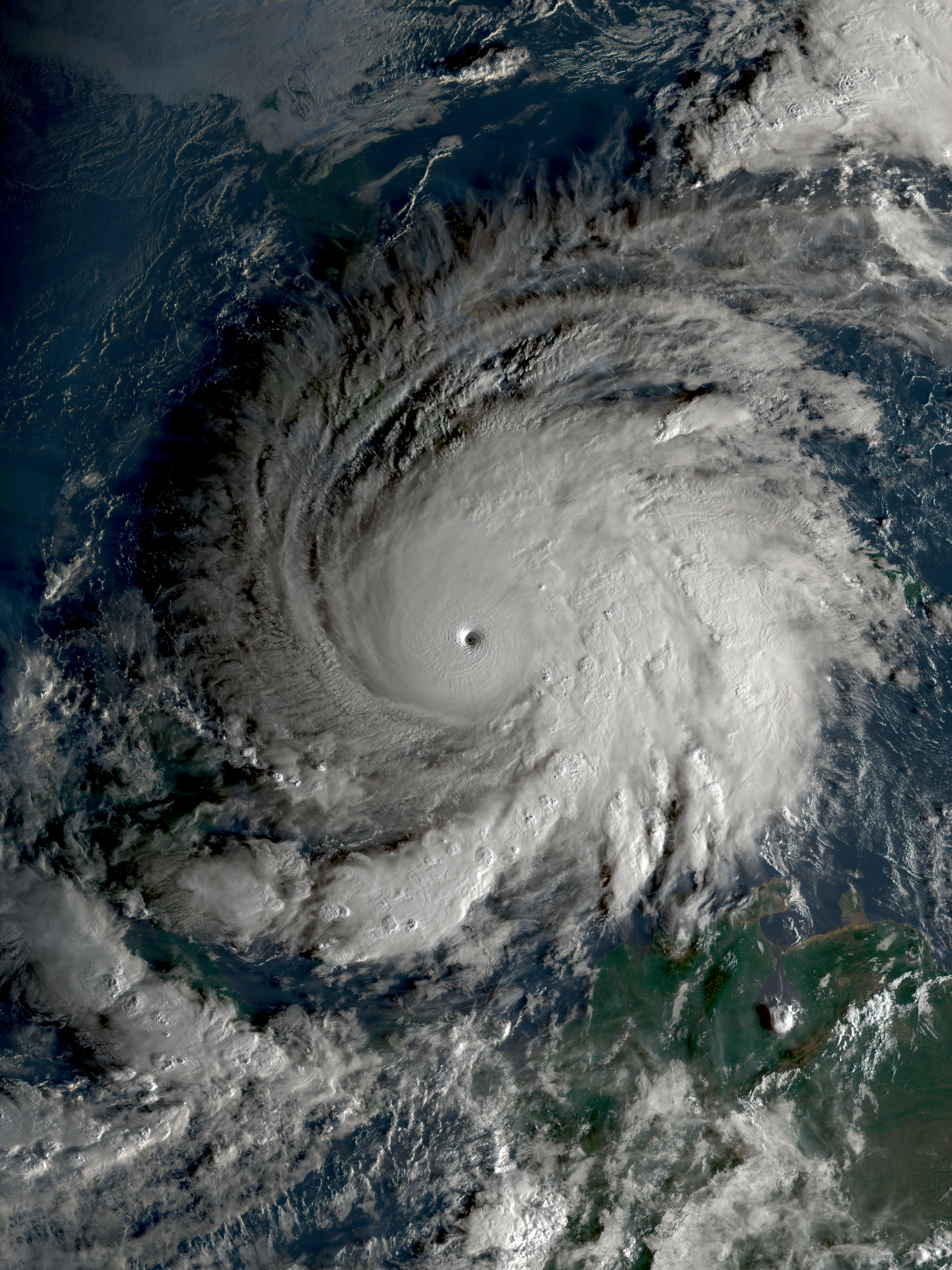
- Melissa at its record peak intensity shortly before landfall in Jamaica on October 28

Meteorological history
- Formed: October 21, 2025
- Extratropical: October 31, 2025
- Dissipated: November 1, 2025

Category 5 major hurricane
- 1-minute sustained (SSHWS/NWS)
- Highest winds: 190 mph (305 km/h) (Tied for highest in the Atlantic basin)
- Lowest pressure: 892 mbar (hPa); 26.34 inHg (Tied for third-lowest in the Atlantic basin)

Overall effects
- Fatalities: 95 total (2 indirect)
- Injuries: 141
- Missing: 27
- Damage: >$12.2 billion (2025 USD) (Costliest in Jamaican history)
- Areas affected: Windward Islands; Greater Antilles (particularly Jamaica and Hispaniola); Coastal Colombia; Lucayan Archipelago; Bermuda
- IBTrACS
- Part of the 2025 Atlantic hurricane season

Hurricane Melissa was an extremely powerful and dangerous tropical cyclone that made a catastrophic landfall in Jamaica in late October 2025. By maximum sustained winds, it is tied with Hurricane Allen as the strongest Atlantic hurricane, and with Hurricane Dorian and the 1935 Labor Day hurricane as the strongest landfalling Atlantic hurricane. Allen and Melissa are the only Atlantic hurricanes to attain maximum sustained winds of 190 mph (305 km/h). In terms of minimum central pressure, it is tied with the 1935 Labor Day hurricane as the third-most intense Atlantic hurricane on record, and was the second-most intense at landfall. Climate scientists analyzing Melissa concluded that human-driven climate change, which raises ocean temperatures, intensified the hurricane's destructive winds and rainfall.

The thirteenth and final named storm, fifth hurricane, fourth major hurricane, and third Category 5 hurricane of the 2025 Atlantic hurricane season, Melissa formed from a tropical wave that originated from West Africa on October 13. It traveled from the central Atlantic to the Windward Islands, and then moved quickly westward into the Caribbean Sea, where it slowed down and developed into Tropical Storm Melissa on October 21. Weak steering currents and moderate wind shear kept Melissa meandering and disorganized for the next few days as it slowly moved northwest. Over the following days, Melissa became better organized, and from October 25 to 27, rapidly intensified into a Category 5 hurricane before making landfall near New Hope, Jamaica, just below peak intensity, on October 28. Melissa emerged from the north coast of Jamaica later that day, weakened, and made landfall near Chivirico, Cuba, the next day. Melissa weakened to a Category 1 hurricane after landfall, approached Bermuda as a Category 2 hurricane, then again weakened before becoming a hurricane-force extratropical low on October 31 northeast of Bermuda, dissipating the following day.

Melissa was the strongest recorded hurricane to strike Jamaica, surpassing Hurricane Gilbert in 1988; numerous structures were completely destroyed. In Hispaniola, even though Melissa itself stayed far to the southwest, its outer rainbands produced heavy rains over the island, leading to severe and deadly flash floods and landslides. Jamaica saw catastrophic damage from Melissa, with several locations near the point of landfall experiencing almost total destruction, especially around the Westmoreland and Saint Elizabeth parishes. Significant agricultural and infrastructure damage occurred in these regions due to storm surge, flooding, and high wind gusts from Melissa's eyewall passing over. Many towns in western Jamaica were also significantly flooded as a result, which also hampered recovery efforts. Telecommunications were also severely affected, especially in the western parts of Jamaica. In all, 95 deaths were attributed to Melissa, including 45 in Jamaica, 43 in Haiti, 4 in the Dominican Republic, and 1 in Cuba. Estimated monetary losses in Jamaica were over US$12 billion. Owing to its catastrophic impacts in Jamaica, the name Melissa was retired from the rotating name list in March 2026 by the World Meteorological Organization, and will never again be used for an Atlantic hurricane. It was replaced with the name Molly, which will first appear in the list for the 2031 season.

== Meteorological history ==
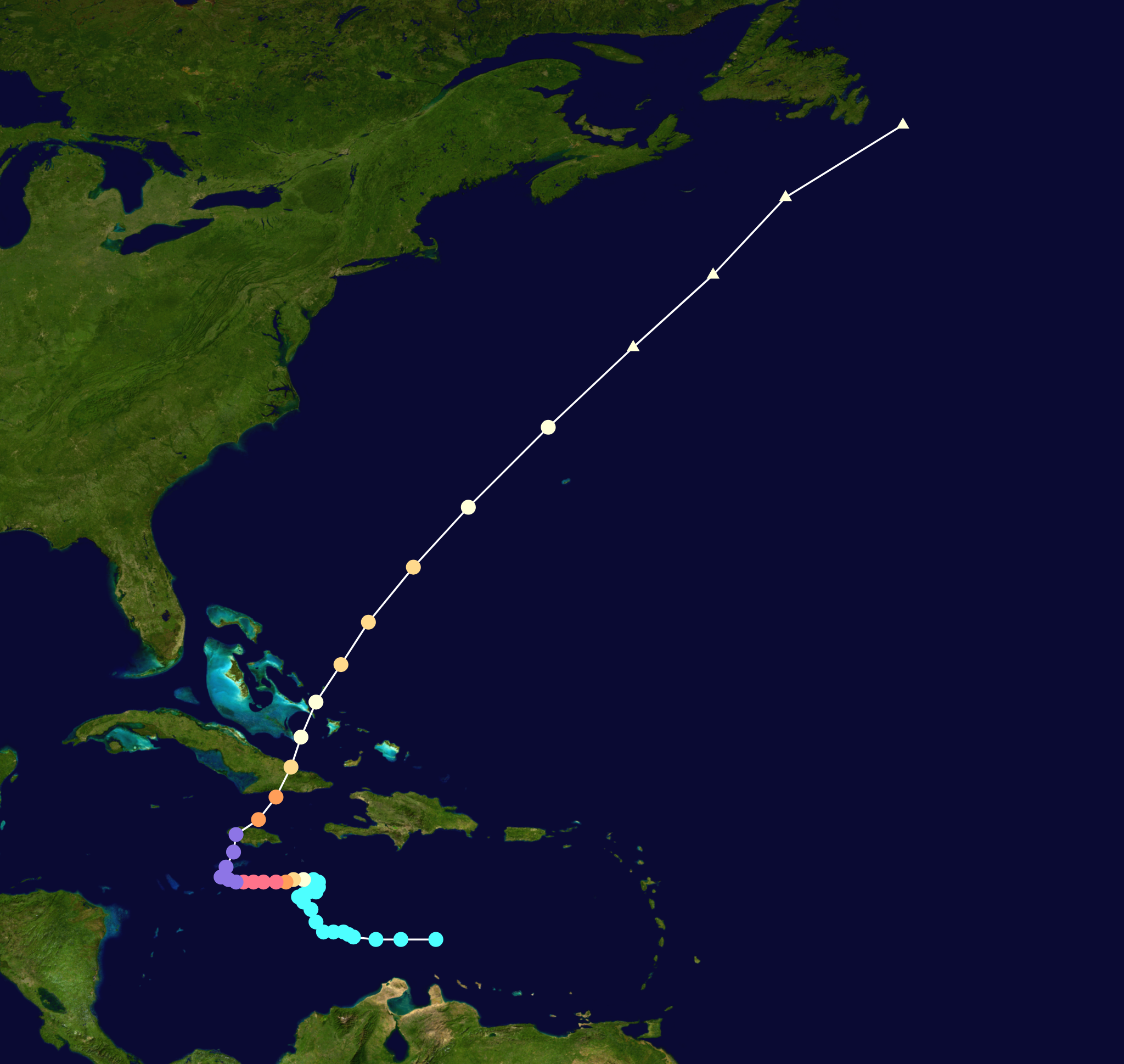
Map plotting the storm's track and intensity, according to the Saffir–Simpson scale Map key Saffir–Simpson scale Tropical depression (≤38 mph, ≤62 km/h) Tropical storm (39–73 mph, 63–118 km/h) Category 1 (74–95 mph, 119–153 km/h) Category 2 (96–110 mph, 154–177 km/h) Category 3 (111–129 mph, 178–208 km/h) Category 4 (130–156 mph, 209–251 km/h) Category 5 (≥157 mph, ≥252 km/h) Unknown Storm type Tropical cyclone Subtropical cyclone Extratropical cyclone, remnant low, tropical disturbance, or monsoon depression

Melissa developed from a tropical wave that first moved off the coast of Africa on October 13. On October 16, the National Hurricane Center (NHC) began monitoring the wave for potential development. By October 19, the wave moved through the Windward Islands and into the Caribbean Sea. The disturbance moved quickly westward, then slowed significantly, providing an opportunity for development of a well-defined center and organized deep convection early on October 21, becoming Tropical Storm Melissa. On account of weak steering currents between ridges of high pressure to its northwest and southeast, Melissa moved slowly and erratically west to northwest over the central Caribbean, and was unable to strengthen appreciably due to westerly wind shear from a broad upper level trough moving over the Gulf of Mexico; the circulation would constantly reform to the east during this period. The trough then bypassed Melissa, resulting in a gradual decrease in the shear. This allowed Melissa's core to become vertically aligned. Later, increased outflow became apparent in the eastern half of the system as it slowly drifted north on October 25. By this time, the northern motion halted as Melissa was increasingly being steered by the ridge to its northwest.

Enabled by very favorable environmental conditions, consisting of sea surface temperatures (SSTs) of 86–88 °F (30–31 °C), very high ocean heat content, wind shear decreasing to lighter values, and very high levels of mid-level relative humidity, Melissa commenced a period of rapid intensification late on October 25 and became a hurricane that afternoon. Its maximum sustained winds nearly doubled from 70 mph (110 km/h) to 130 mph (215 km/h) in 24 hours. While moving generally westward, Melissa attained Category 5 status early on October 27; its winds reached 180 mph (285 km/h) by 18:00 UTC and stayed at that level for about 18 hours. Unusually for a storm of such high intensity, Melissa never underwent an eyewall replacement cycle, allowing it to sustain its high intensity for a prolonged period, according to several meteorologists. After turning north-northeastward, the system attained maximum sustained winds of 190 mph (305 km/h), and a minimum central pressure of 892 mbar (hPa) (26.34 inHg) at 12:00 UTC on October 28. Land interaction imparted slight weakening, and at 17:25 UTC, the storm made landfall near New Hope in Westmoreland Parish just below peak intensity, with sustained winds of 185 mph (295 km/h) and a pressure of 897 mbar (hPa) (26.49 inHg). The hurricane weakened inland over the mountains, and emerged off Jamaica's north coast into the Caribbean at Category 3 strength, headed toward Cuba.

Most intense Atlantic hurricanes
Rank	Hurricane	Season	Pressure	
Rank	Hurricane	Season	hPa	inHg
1	Wilma	2005	882	26.05
2	Gilbert	1988	888	26.23
3	"Labor Day"	1935	892	26.34
3	Melissa	2025	892	26.34
5	Rita	2005	895	26.43
5	Milton	2024	895	26.43
7	Allen	1980	899	26.55
8	Camille	1969	900	26.58
9	Katrina	2005	902	26.64
10	Mitch	1998	905	26.73
10	Dean	2007	905	26.73
Source: HURDAT

The storm continued to weaken as it headed towards Cuba and the hurricane made landfall in eastern Cuba at 07:10 UTC on October 29 about 20 mi (30 km) east of Chivirico, with sustained Category 3 winds of 115 mph (185 km/h) and a pressure of 954 mbar (hPa) (28.17 inHg). Inland, the rugged terrain of Cuba led to additional weakening, and the storm's sustained winds fell to high-end Category 1 strength by the time Melissa moved back offshore, into the Atlantic Ocean, eight hours later. The storm accelerated northeast, maintaining that intensity before making landfall in Long Island at 22:15 UTC on 29 October, followed by another landfall at San Salvador Island, Bahamas with a slightly lower pressure at 02:00 UTC on 30 October. Late that day, the storm re-strengthened once more to Category 2 intensity, attaining sustained winds of 105 mph (165 km/h), as it headed towards Bermuda on the morning of October 30. Increasing wind shear and decreasing sea surface temperatures caused Melissa to undergo extratropical transition early on October 31, and to weaken again to Category 1 strength, as it passed near Bermuda. Melissa completed its transition to a hurricane-force extratropical cyclone that day, dissipating fully on November 1 as it opened into a trough and merged into a larger trough.

=== Records ===
This loop, around Melissa’s peak intensity, follows the rotation of the eyewall to make the movement of the eye’s powerful mesovortices more visible.

Globally, Hurricane Melissa is the strongest tropical cyclone of 2025 and the strongest tropical cyclone to make landfall in Jamaica on record. Melissa is tied with Hurricane Allen as the most intense Atlantic hurricane in terms of one-minute sustained winds and is tied with the 1935 Labor Day hurricane as the third-most intense Atlantic hurricane on record in terms of lowest barometric pressure. Melissa is the second most intense Atlantic hurricane at landfall in terms of lowest barometric pressure after the 1935 Labor Day hurricane and is tied with Hurricane Dorian and the 1935 Labor Day hurricane for the strongest Atlantic hurricane at landfall in terms of maximum sustained winds. Melissa also holds the record for the highest wind gust ever measured by dropsonde – 252 mph (406 km/h), surpassing the previous record of 241 mph (387 km/h) by Typhoon Megi in 2010.

=== Effect of climate change ===
Melissa experienced extreme rapid intensification as it drifted slowly over waters that were 2.5 °F (1.4 °C) warmer than average, sea conditions that two rapid attribution studies estimated to be 500–900 times more likely to be that warm because of human-caused climate change. Additionally, climate change is estimated by these studies to have strengthened the hurricane's top wind speed by about 10 mph (16 km/h), thus increasing its potential to inflict damage by up to 50%. Also, rainfall was estimated to be up to 10% higher due to climate change.

== Preparations ==
=== Greater Antilles ===
Satellite imagery of Melissa from October 21 through 31

On October 21, a hurricane watch was issued for southern portions of Haiti, while a tropical storm watch was issued for Jamaica. Jamaica's watch was upgraded to a hurricane watch and tropical storm warning on October 23. The next day, it was upgraded to a hurricane warning. A tropical storm warning was added to the southern portions of Haiti, also on October 23. The Margaritaville at Sea Islander rerouted from stops on Grand Cayman and Jamaica to Belize and Honduras. The Disney Treasure was rerouted from Tortola and Saint Thomas to Cozumel and Disney Wish changed its schedule at Castaway Cay to allow for the Treasure's route change. Celebrity Beyond and Icon of the Seas saw a complete change to their schedules, moving to a western Caribbean-focused route. Carnival Celebration and Carnival Vista scrapped stops in the Dominican Republic. Carnival Dream and Carnival Liberty cancelled stops to Montego Bay and Liberty also cancelled a stop in the Cayman Islands. Airlines cancelled 167 flights in airports from the Greater Antilles and other nearby regions such as in the Bahamas, Barbados, Haiti, Jamaica, and the US Virgin Islands.

The U.S. National Weather Service in Puerto Rico issued a flood warning for several municipalities due to potential heavy rains from the outer bands of Melissa on October 22.

In the Dominican Republic, four shelters were opened in San Juan de la Maguana, San Cristóbal, and the National District and 61 people sought sheltering. Twelve provinces were placed under red alert. Around 90 people evacuated Saona Island.

The Government of the Cayman Islands provided sandbags for citizens. Cayman Airways waived change-of-flight fees in relation to Melissa's approach. All touristic diving operations ceased on the islands of Little Cayman and Cayman Brac on October 24.

In Cuba, hurricane warnings were issued for the provinces of Granma, Santiago de Cuba, Guantánamo, Holguín, and Las Tunas while a tropical storm warning was issued for Camagüey Province. First Secretary of the Communist Party of Cuba Miguel Díaz-Canel reported that 735,000 people were evacuated in the country's eastern regions. Additionally, the United States Navy began evacuating several hundred people, including all non-mission-essential U.S. citizens, from Guantanamo Bay Naval Base to Florida.

==== Jamaica ====
Satellite animation of Hurricane Melissa making landfall in Jamaica on October 28

The Ministry of Transportation of Jamaica deployed 30 buses for the emergency situation in Portmore, Spanish Town, Rockfort, and Montego Bay. On October 25, all airports were shut down. By October 27, regular services with the Jamaica Urban Transit Company were suspended. The National Water Commission mobilized teams and equipment. The University of the West Indies ordered the evacuation of its students in Mona, and graduation ceremonies at the Mona campus were postponed. Sandy Gully in Saint Andrew was de-silted as the storm approached. On October 24, public institutions including the National Gallery of Jamaica and the Bob Marley Museum closed. Shelters were opened at various locations, and by October 27, 1,700 people had evacuated. Some shelters were closed as residents were arriving, forcing them to wait outside. The government also reported that misinformation was dissuading people from using shelters. Black River High School was confused as a shelter and some people went there.

=== Elsewhere ===
On October 17, a yellow adverse weather alert was issued for Trinidad and Tobago as the precursor of Melissa approached. On October 18, a yellow alert was also issued in Martinique. That same day, a flash flood warning was issued in Barbados. In Curaçao, Prime Minister Gilmar Pisas closed schools on the island to allow for greater flexibility in the operation of emergency services. Colombia issued yellow alerts along its Atlantic coast for rough seas.

Hurricane warnings were made for the central and southwest Bahamas while a tropical storm warning was made for the Turks and Caicos Islands. Evacuation orders were made for Acklins, Crooked Island, Inagua, Long Cay, Mayaguana, and Ragged Island. Almost 1,500 residents evacuated prior to Melissa. Residents on the southern portion of Long Island were bussed to a community center. The British Ministry of Defence deployed eight people and the HMS Trent to the Turks and Caicos Islands to aid with preparations and relief. Several members of the Parliament of the Turks and Caicos Islands and the Governor of the Turks and Caicos Islands distributed food and sandbags to their constituents. Generators were filled and tested prior to the storm and two pump stations were activated. Carnival Celebration, Carnival Sunrise, and Freedom of the Seas scrapped stops to the Turks and Caicos Islands.

A hurricane warning was issued for Bermuda. The Causeway, buses, and L.F. Wade International Airport were closed on the evening of October 30 and reopened October 31. Several ferry routes were closed on October 30 and all were closed the next day. Cedarbridge Academy opened as a shelter on October 30 and government offices were closed on the same day.

== Impact ==
Casualties and damage by country
Country	Deaths	Injuries	Missing	Damage (USD)
Cuba	1	17	0	Unknown
Dominican Republic	4	0	1	$23.36 million
Haiti	43	15	13	Unknown
Jamaica	45	109	13	$12.2 billion
Total	95	141	27	$12.2 billion

After the storm, outbreaks of mosquito-borne illnesses occurred, with reports of 700 cases of chikungunya per day and over 50,000 hospitalized due to the disease.

=== Hispaniola ===
Hispaniola received the most rainfall from Melissa, with parts of the Tiburon Peninsula receiving over 35 inches (890 mm) of rain. Polo, in the Dominican Republic, received 29 inches (740 mm) of rain.

In Haiti, 43 people were killed and 13 were missing; deaths include three from a landslide near Port-au-Prince, another by a falling tree in Marigot, and 25 after the La Digue River burst its banks in Petit-Goâve, while 15 others were injured by a collapsing wall in Artibonite Department. Petit-Goâve was submerged by dirt and debris. The La Digue River also swept away cars and homes. Over 645,000 people were affected. Six medical facilities and at least 840,000 structures were damaged across the country. By November 1, 15,800 people were still in shelters. A survey of farming households after the storm indicated agricultural losses as high as $5,854 per household in the most affected department.

Across the Dominican Republic, more than 1.1 million people were without water supply after heavy rainfall and flooding disrupted water supply systems, including in Pedro Brand, Los Alcarrizos, and Santo Domingo Oeste. It was reported that 56 aqueducts were out of service. A lane of a road in María Trinidad Sánchez collapsed and 53 bridges were damaged. A façade fell off of a hospital in Constanza due to rains, leading to the hospital suspending operations. A 71-year-old man died after being swept away by a swollen river in Santo Domingo Norte, while a child in Los Mameyes went missing during the heavy rainfall. A total of four people were reported dead across the country. Damage in the country totaled RD$1.5 billion ($23.36 million USD).

=== Jamaica ===
Melissa was the strongest as well as costliest hurricane on record to strike Jamaica, with damage estimated to be J$1.95 trillion (US$12.2 billion). At least 45 people were killed, 13 were missing and 96 others were injured across Jamaica.

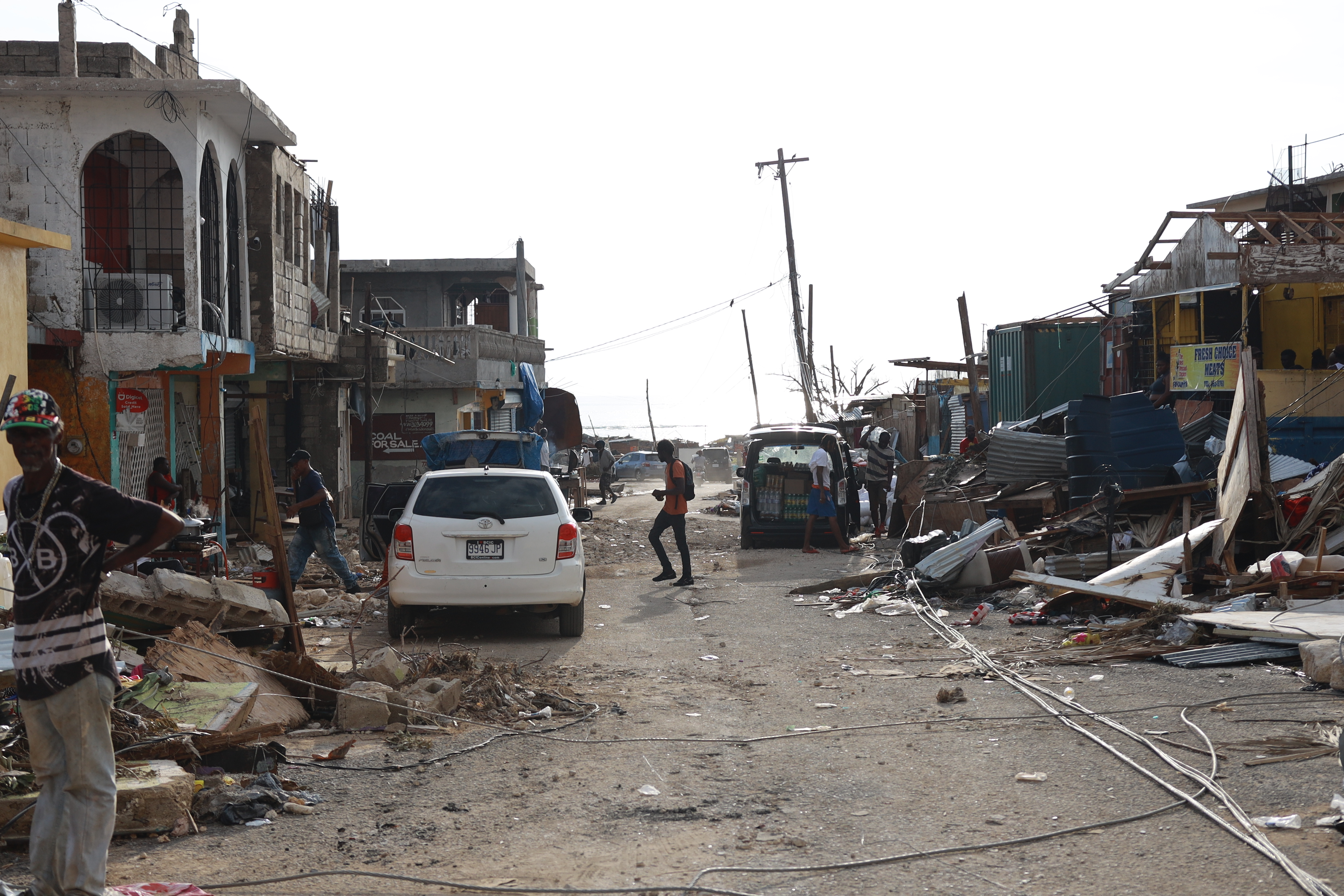
Damage from Hurricane Melissa near White House

By October 27, prior to Melissa's landfall on Jamaica, three people in Saint Elizabeth, Saint Catherine, and Hanover parishes died of indirect causes and 13 others were injured while preparing for the hurricane. Flooding was reported in Old Harbour, while multiple communities in Saint Elizabeth parish had lost power by 06:00 local time. By 15:00 UTC, about 200,000 customers, or 35% of Jamaica's homes and businesses, were left without power. Around 52,000 Jamaica Public Service customers lost power as Melissa approached the island. This number rose to 530,000 people after Melissa struck the island.

Most intense landfalling Atlantic hurricanes Intensity is measured solely by central pressure
Rank	Hurricane (Note: Storms with designations in quotation marks are officially unnamed. Tropical storms and hurricanes were not named before the year 1950.)	Season	Landfall pressure
1	"Labor Day"	1935	892 mbar (hPa)
2	Melissa	2025	897 mbar (hPa)
3	Camille	1969	900 mbar (hPa)
3	Gilbert	1988	900 mbar (hPa)
5	Dean	2007	905 mbar (hPa)
6	"Cuba"	1924	910 mbar (hPa)
6	Dorian	2019	910 mbar (hPa)
8	Janet	1955	914 mbar (hPa)
8	Irma	2017	914 mbar (hPa)
10	"Cuba"	1932	918 mbar (hPa)
Sources: HURDAT, AOML/HRD, NHC

Hurricane Melissa made landfall in New Hope, Westmoreland, as an extremely powerful Category 5 hurricane. The highest reported wind in Jamaica was a gust to 131 miles per hour (211 km/h) recorded near New Hope primary school before the station was destroyed. 15 deaths were recorded in Westmoreland Parish, including a pregnant woman who died in Petersfield when her home collapsed during the hurricane. All public buildings in Seaford Town, the location of a German minority and museum sponsored by the Government of Germany, were destroyed. Extensive damage was reported in Saint Elizabeth, with the parish described as being "underwater". 18 deaths were recorded in the parish in association with Melissa. Communities in the parish were reportedly obliterated, with entire buildings collapsing. Severe flooding was reported in several locations including Mandeville, where houses were submerged up to their roofs in water. A BBC journalist described the town as being "flattened" by the hurricane. The principal of St. Elizabeth Technical High School said the school had suffered severe damage including lost roofs. Black River and Crawford experienced the highest storm surge of around 7–11 feet (2.1–3.4 m). Black River's hospital suffered significant structural damage, with the roof being blown off. It was estimated that nearly 90% of the town's homes lost their roofs. The town's police station also received significant damage, with several windows and its gate damaged. The fire station was inundated with 16 feet (4.9 m) of water. The Waterloo House, a colonial-era house and historic landmark, was destroyed by Melissa. In nearby Cobie Ridge, a sinkhole opened up in the home of an elderly woman. Severe flooding was also reported in Alligator Pond. Brown's Town Community College in Saint Ann Parish suffered damage. In Saint James Parish, much of Montego Bay was flooded, including the city's port, industrial park and Sangster International Airport's terminal, with much of the ceiling having collapsed. The Montego Bay Sports Complex was made unusable. Two deaths were recorded in Saint James Parish, including an infant killed by a falling tree. In Trelawny Parish, building collapses, roof damage and downed trees were reported in Falmouth, which was described as "all but destroyed". Several public buildings in Falmouth were destroyed including the courthouse, infirmary, and road and works department. In Stewart Town, Westwood High School reported damage, with preliminary losses of J$298 million (US$1.84 million). In Kingston, a billboard frame was partially toppled and a basin was flooded, while a landslide blocked a road in Gordon Town.

Around 150,000 structures were damaged by Melissa. The storm ripped the roofs off of about 120,000 structures. Around 24,000 buildings were totaled. Thousands of families were left homeless. Around 40–50% of hotels were damaged by Melissa. 76 police stations were damaged. Total losses in housing, include damage and loss of income, was estimated to be over J$767 billion. The parishes of Saint Elizabeth, Westmoreland, Saint James, Trelawny, and Hanover, which received the worst of Melissa's impacts, lost all communication. Sandals would take until December to reopen five of their hotels and May 2026 to reopen the other three. Of 1033 public schools in Jamaica, 695 reported some level of damage, with 291 reporting severe damage. By December 10, 160 schools remained closed and were not expected to reopen until January. Total costs to the education sector were estimated to be J$30.3 billion. Around 40% of the national health system was damaged due to Melissa. December 2025 saw a significant decline in air traffic compared to December 2024 (though higher than November 2025), particularly at Sangster International Airport, which saw a decline of over 48% compared to the prior year.

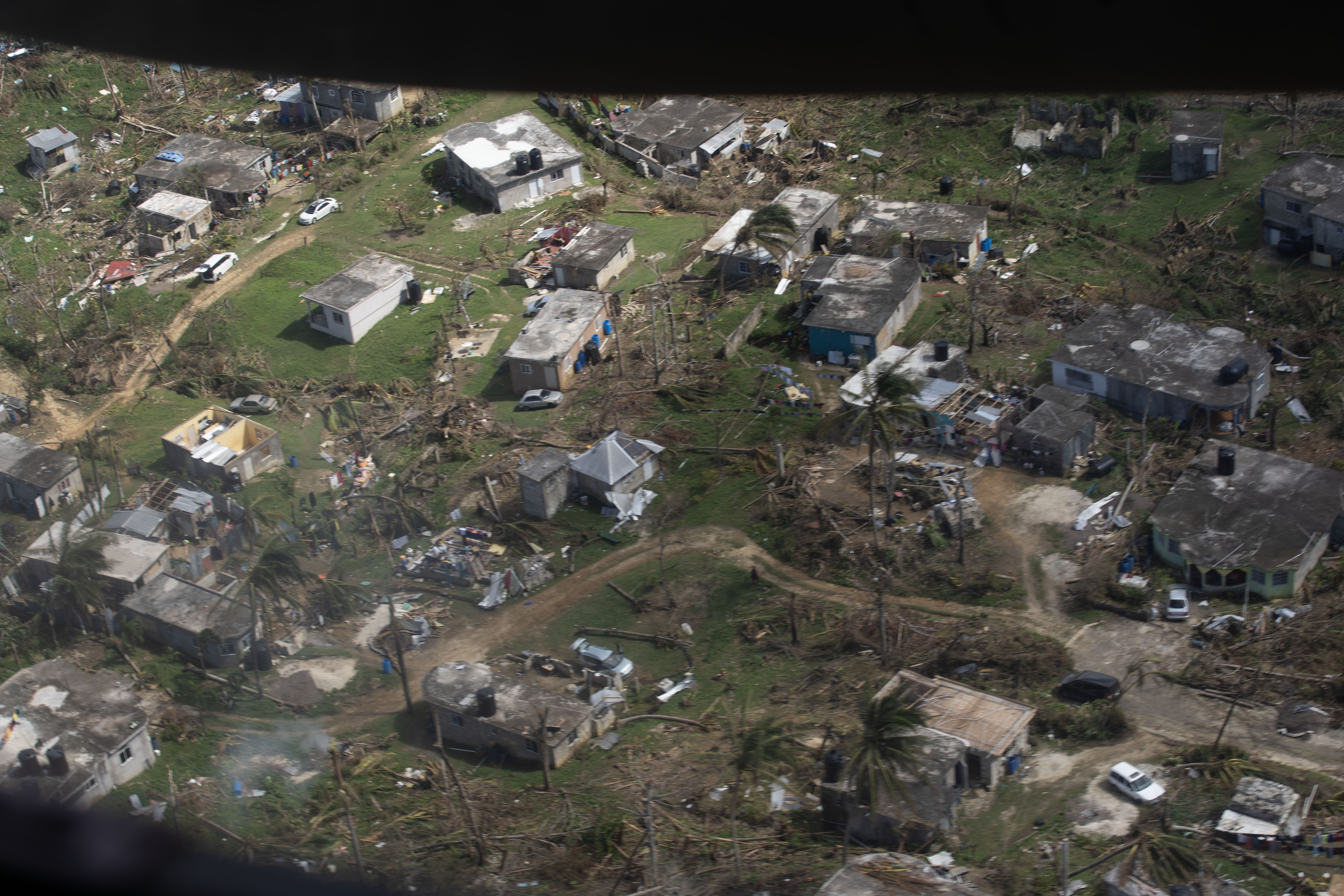
Damage in Bethel Town, Westmoreland Parish, Jamaica

Melissa damaged at least 102,300 acres (41,390 ha) of farmland, affecting more than 70,000 farmers and leading to the loss of over 1.25 million animals. Total losses in agriculture were estimated at J$29.5 billion (US$184 million). Around 80,000 acres (32,400 ha) of vegetable fields were damaged and around 6,100 acres (2,450 ha) of plantain and banana farms were damaged. Over one hundred plantain and banana farms applied for disaster funds. Over half of the island's forests suffered damage.

Flooding from Melissa persisted following the storm, with waters rising again two weeks later in Manchester Parish, prompting the local health department to issue advisories to avoid direct contact. After the hurricane's passage, a leptospirosis outbreak occurred as a result of Melissa, with 71 suspected cases recorded and seven confirmed deaths resulting from the outbreak so far. As of January 1, 2026, many areas remained without access to electricity, road access and clean water; in a statement, Jamaica's National Water Committee announced they would write off unpaid water bills from customers who had received no water since the hurricane.

=== Cuba ===
Earlier in the season, Cuba had experienced flooding, causing immense damage, from Hurricane Imelda. Melissa also impacted the same areas that were still recovering from Hurricane Oscar and its associated damage to power infrastructure the year prior. Prior to Melissa's landfall on Cuba, the hurricane caused flooding and landslides in the southeastern province of Santiago de Cuba. Melissa made landfall near Chivirico in Santiago de Cuba at around 07:20 UTC on October 29, with sustained winds of 115 mph (185 km/h). The highest reported winds in Cuba were a gust of 136 mph (219 km/h) at an elevated weather station and a gust to 116 mph (187 km/h) in the town of Contramaestre. First Secretary Miguel Díaz-Canel reported "considerable damage" from the hurricane in Cuba, with widespread flooding and streets buried in debris across Santiago de Cuba. Around 992,000 houses were damaged or destroyed in Guantánamo, Holguín, and Santiago de Cuba provinces; the region lost power and cellular service. In the nation, 642 medical facilities and 2,100 school were damaged. An oil refinery was damaged in Santiago de Cuba. Infrastructure to the plant, which was necessary for repairs, and a refinery tower were the most severely damaged areas of the plant. Crews from Havana and Sancti Spíritus were sent to aid with its reconstruction. Antonio Maceo Airport was damaged by Melissa and would not reopen to domestic flights until November 15. In El Cobre, in Santiago de Cuba, one death was reported. Seventeen people were injured and three million others were affected across the country, with 735,000 in shelters. The Cauto River overflowed, with some regions receiving around 20 inches (510 mm) of rainfall. Multiple dams reported over 20 in (500 mm) of rain. Flooding was recorded in Veguitas after excess water was removed from a nearby dam. After the storm, over 400,000 people lacked access to potable water.

At the U.S. Guantanamo Bay Naval Base, downed trees led to 16 homes being considered uninhabitable and the air traffic control tower at the base's air strip was partially flooded.

Two weeks after landfall, 60% of power infrastructure in Santiago de Cuba province was without power. About 158,000 hectares of crops were damaged or destroyed by the hurricane. Additionally, 53,000 people remained displaced. Due to standing water, a lack of medicine, and a general decline in Cuban quality of life, outbreaks of diseases, like dengue fever and chikungunya, occurred following Melissa. Additionally, it was reported that as of November 26, almost a month after the storm's passage, thousands remained without water or proper shelter in Cuba, in addition to continued lack of electrical power.

=== Lucayan Archipelago ===
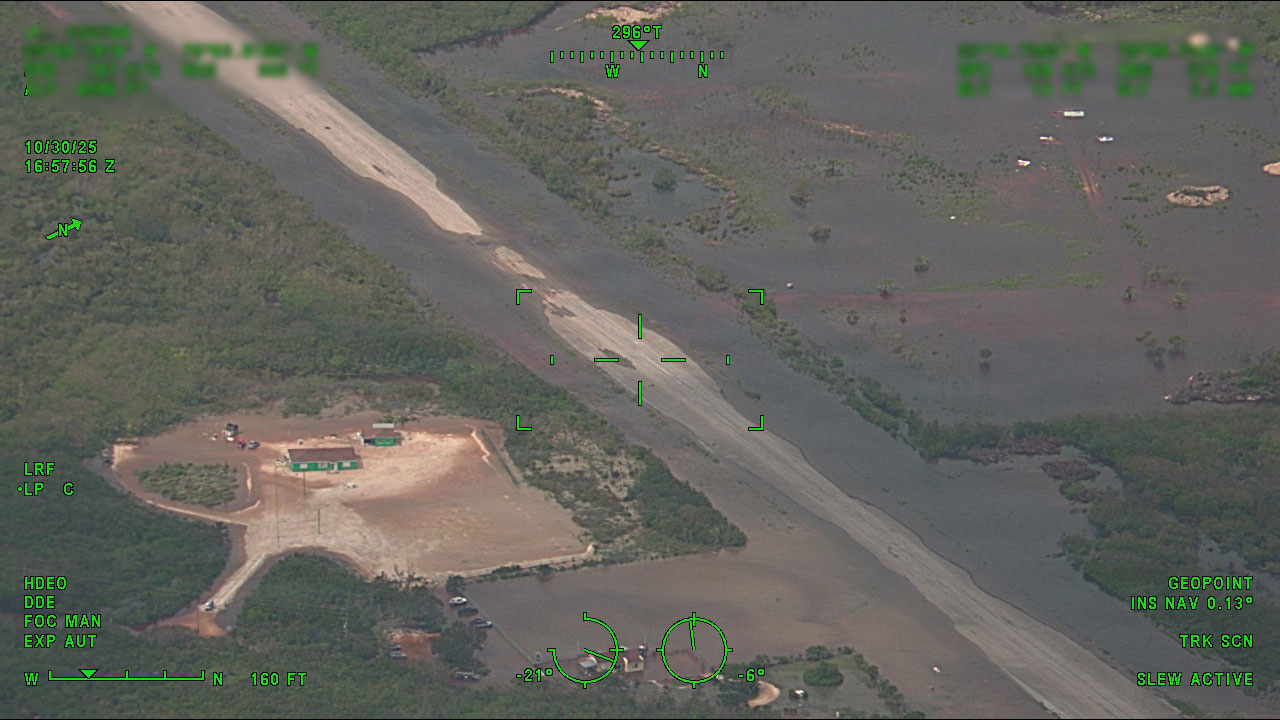
Flooding caused by Melissa in the Bahamas

While passing through the Bahamas, Melissa produced wind gusts of 85 mph (137 km/h) on Crooked Island, along with sustained winds of 76 mph (122 km/h). Cat Island experienced hurricane force winds, knocking out power. Power was restored by October 31. Trees were uprooted, utility poles were downed, and roofs were damaged across the archipelago. Deadman's Cay Airport was flooded. Several roads were impassable due to debris on Long Cay. San Salvador Island was without power and had poor cellular service due to downed utility poles. Bahamas Power and Light (BPL) reported 18 downed poles on the island. Five people from BPL were sent to San Salvador. Rum Cay reported flooding and poor cellular service. The eye of Melissa passed over the southern portion of Long Island. The power station on Long Island was severely damaged. Some structural damage to several buildings was also reported on the island. Extreme flooding was reported in several areas in Long Island.

The Turks and Caicos Islands were impacted only by rough seas, brisk winds, and thunderstorms.

=== Elsewhere ===
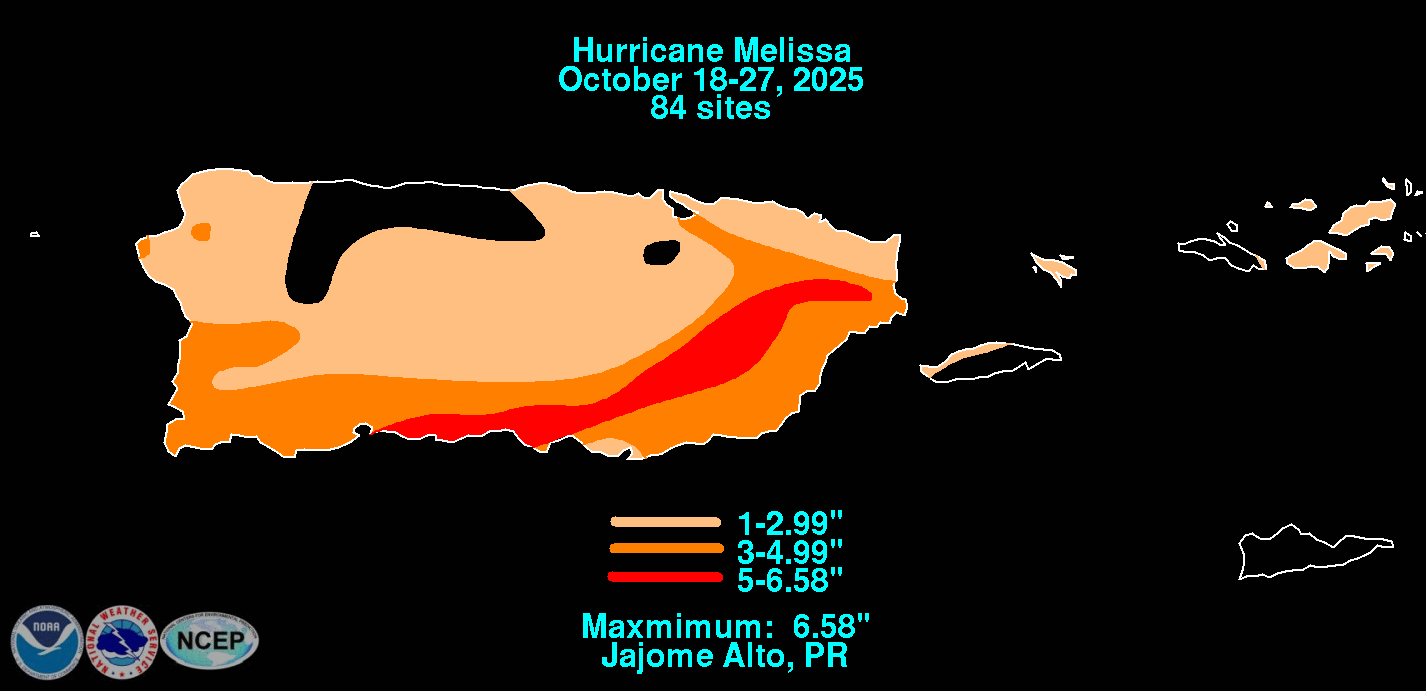
Rainfall map over Puerto Rico.

Winds gusted as high as 45 mph (74 km/h) were recorded on October 19, at Barbados's Grantley Adams International Airport during heavy rain squalls. Other peak gusts included 32 mph (52 km/h) at Saint Lucia and 37 mph (61 km/h) at Martinique.

In Puerto Rico, Melissa's outer rain bands resulted in heavy rainfall in Guánica on October 24, affecting nearly 400 families and causing damage to buildings and infrastructure.

Melissa caused rough seas along the Colombian coast, with waves of up to 11 ft (3.5 m).

In Bermuda, L.F. Wade International Airport recorded wind gusts to 61 mph (98 km/h) during Melissa's passage north-northwest of the island. An elevated anemometer at the National Museum of Bermuda also recorded a peak wind gust of 98 mph (158 km/h). Bermuda Electric Light Company reported that around 19,000 customers, around half the island, lost power as a result of Melissa, and that five substations were taken offline. Island wide, the hurricane's impact was limited to scattered debris, downed wires, and utility pole fires.

== Aftermath ==
=== Jamaica ===
Runoff and upwelling caused by Melissa

The United States and Jamaican Air Forces worked to deliver supplies to isolated communities in Jamaica. The Jamaican National Housing Trust bought 5,000 container homes to distribute and sell among Jamaicans. The Prime Minister noted that shipping would take an extensive amount of time. A six-month-long moratorium on mortgages was also issued for 20,000 properties. The Jamaican Government allocated J$10 million towards housing reconstruction. Officials prioritized the restoration of power to the city of Montego Bay to jump start the tourism industry in undamaged hotels. Consumption taxes on certain goods were suspended until January 15, 2026.

The Miami Heat and its regional partners donated around US$1 million in supplies and necessary items as part of recovery efforts in Jamaica following Melissa. Various South Florida aid organizations also mobilized to provide assistance to affected island states. Likewise, The Walt Disney Company announced it would contribute US$1 million to help relief efforts, and American Airlines raised more than US$1.2 million for the American Red Cross to help aid communities affected by the storm. The Philadelphia Union, in collaboration with goalkeeper Andre Blake, announced a relief drive to help those in Jamaica affected by the storm. Additionally, Home Depot co-founder and Atlanta Falcons owner Arthur Blank announced he would donate US$1.5 million to World Central Kitchen to help provide food and water for those affected, along with a further US$1 million to Team Rubicon to aid in on-the-ground response. The Secours Populaire Français sent a mission to Jamaica. Intcomex pledged support for the Cave District, Westmoreland for six months.

The World Bank activated a support package alongside the Jamaican government and the Inter-American Development Bank to conduct a post-storm damage analysis. The World Bank also announced the payout of a US$150 million catastrophe bond triggered by Melissa. On December 23, the World Food Programme began a program to distribute food to 123,000 Jamaicans in the west of the nation. The government of the Cayman Islands sent US$200,000 of supplies and pledged $1.2 million in aid to Jamaica. BermudAir organized an airlift for Jamaica. 40,000 pounds of goods were donated to Jamaica from the Jamaican Association of Bermuda. The government of Trinidad and Tobago sent eight containers of supplies to Jamaica and pledged to send more aid in the coming days. The United States Department of State sent a disaster assistance response team to provide search and recovery assistance. The State Department would later announce they were sending $12 million to Jamaica. IsraAid sent an emergency response team to Jamaica after the storm passed and brought mental health experts to provide mental health and psychosocial support. The Government of the Cayman Islands donated US$1 million to Jamaica, with a third going to a community voucher, education, and agriculture each. Starlink services were made free for the people of Jamaica with the goal of helping recovery efforts.

On December 1, the CAF – Development Bank of Latin America and the Caribbean, the International Monetary Fund, the World Bank, the Caribbean Development Bank and the Inter-American Development Bank jointly announced a support package of up to US$6.7 billion over three years to aid Jamaica's recovery from an estimated total damage of US$8.8 billion. Two concerts, Jamaica Strong and Nice Up Jamaica, were hosted in support of Jamaica in December, headlined by several Caribbean singers like Johnny Osbourne.

Speaking in mid-November at the 2025 United Nations Climate Change Conference, Jamaica's economic growth minister, Matthew Samuda, told delegates, "Hurricane Melissa changed the life of every Jamaican in less than 24 hours." He also identified the hurricane as evidence of "the new phase of climate change," and called on the global community to fulfill their commitments to mitigating the worst effects of climate change. The Minister of Tourism stated that the nation lost US$62 million in tourism in the first week after the storm.

On November 10, a Beechcraft King Air bound for a hurricane relief mission in Jamaica crashed in Coral Springs, Florida, shortly after taking off from Fort Lauderdale Executive Airport. The two occupants of the plane, a Christian missionary and his adult daughter, were killed in the crash. Within relief shipments, four firearms were found by the Jamaica Customs Agency, which are under investigation.

In January 2026, the Jamaican forestry department announced an initiative to plant 300,000 trees to help recovery of forest ecosystems damaged by Melissa. The program, known as the "Reforestation, Ecological Enhancement, and Landscape Framework initiative" or RE-LEAF, officially began in March 2026.

=== Elsewhere ===
The U.S. State Department would later announce it was sending $24 million to help nations affected by Melissa (including Jamaica), with $8.5 million to Haiti, $500,000 to the Bahamas, and $3 million to Cuba in coordination with the Catholic Church. Additionally, the United Nations appealed for $74 million on November 5 to help aid those impacted by Melissa in Cuba. Three humanitarian flights with supplies from the World Food Programme, United Nations Population Fund, and Caritas Internationalis were orchestrated to deliver supplies to the eastern provinces of Cuba. The Pan American Health Organization delivered 23,000 pounds (10,000 kg) of medical supplies to Cuba. China sent supplies to Cuba along with 5,000 photovoltaic panels. Starlink services were made free for the people of the Bahamas with the goal of helping recovery efforts. Japan donated a $1 million to Haiti after Melissa.

Due to other islands being damaged from Hurricane Melissa, the Dominican Republic saw a burst in tourism later in 2025. The Dominican Republic approved of hundreds of flights to manage the surge.

=== Retirement ===
Due to the widespread destruction and loss of life in the Caribbean from the storm, particularly in Jamaica, the name Melissa was retired by the World Meteorological Organization in March 2026, and it will never again be used for an Atlantic tropical cyclone. It was replaced with Molly, which will first appear on the 2031 season list.

== See also ==
- Weather of 2025
- Tropical cyclones in 2025
- Timeline of the 2025 Atlantic hurricane season
- List of Category 5 Atlantic hurricanes
- Hurricanes in Hispaniola
- List of Jamaica hurricanes
- List of Cuba hurricanes
- Hurricanes in the Lucayan Archipelago
- List of Bermuda hurricanes
