= Gaynair =

Gaynair is a surname. Notable people with the surname include:

- Ferdinand Gaynair (late 1920s–2021), Jamaican-Canadian saxophonist
- Ian Gaynair (born 1986), Belizean footballer
- Wilton Gaynair (1927–1995), Jamaican-German jazz saxophonist, brother of Ferdinand

== See also ==
- Gayner, people with this surname
