= Lennie Hibbert =

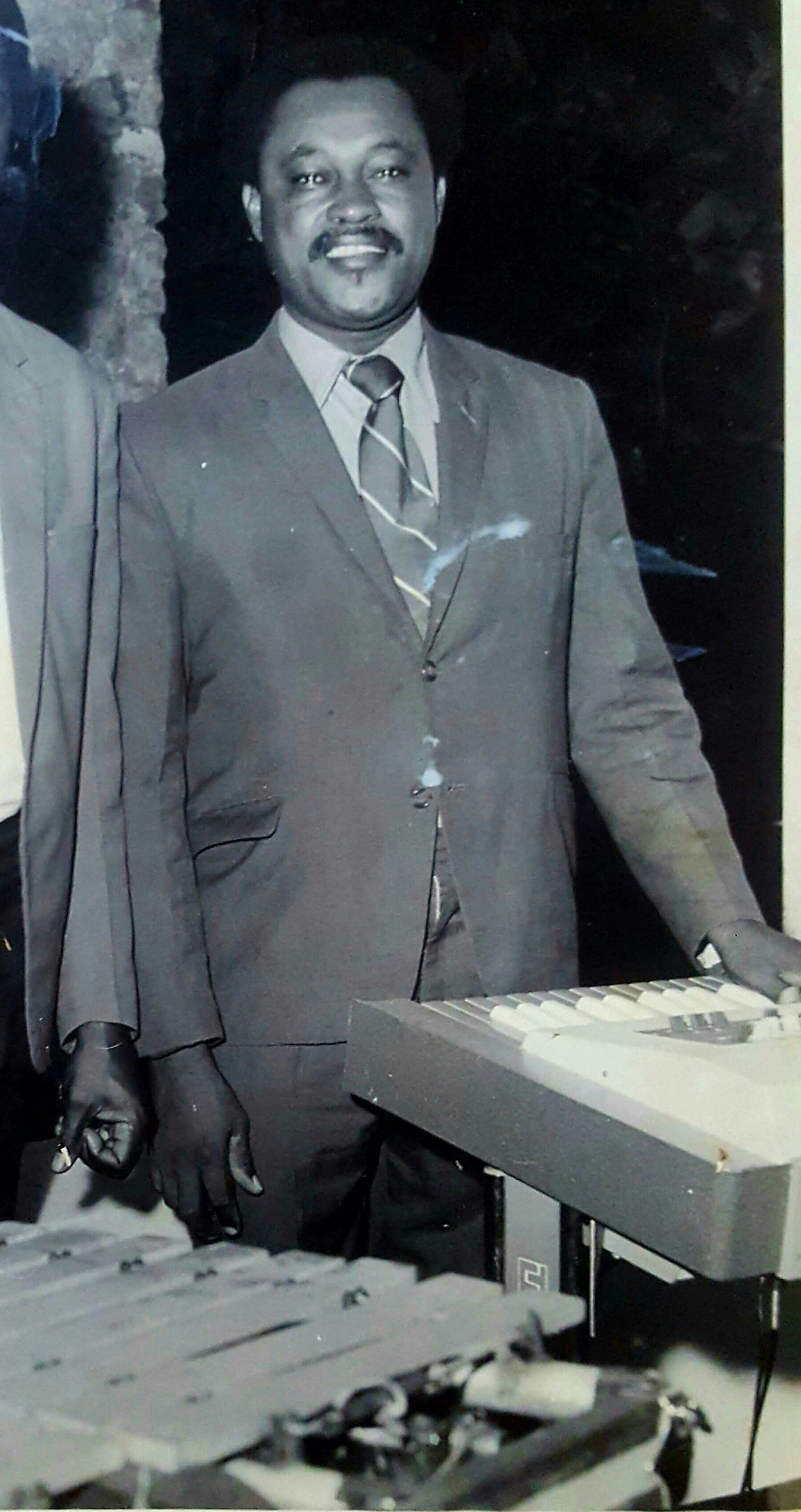

Background information
- Born: Leonard Aloysius Hibbert; 12 November 1928; Mavis Bank, Jamaica
- Died: 8 September 1984 (aged 55)
- Genres: Reggae, jazz
- Occupations: Bandleader, musician
- Instruments: Vibraphone, drums
- Years active: 1940s–mid-1970s
- Label: Studio One

Lennie Hibbert OD (born Leonard Aloysius Hibbert, 12 November 1928 – 8 September 1984) was a Jamaican musician who was bandmaster at the Alpha Cottage School, and also a vibraphone virtuoso, recording two albums for Studio One.

== Biography ==
Hibbert was born in Mavis Bank, Jamaica in 1928. At the age of eight he began attending the Alpha School, where he joined the school band as a drummer. He left the school in 1944 and played in several small orchestras before joining the Military Band in 1946. While with the Military Band he taught himself to play the vibraphone. In 1955, he returned to Alpha as bandmaster, his students including Floyd Lloyd and Vin Gordon. He worked as a live musician in jazz groups in the 1960s, and frequently worked with the Sound Dimension band, recording some of the best-known riddims for Clement "Coxsone" Dodd. He recorded his debut solo album, Creation, for Dodd in 1969, comprising instrumentals featuring Hibbert's vibraphone playing. A single from the album, "Village Soul", has been described as "simply one of the most beautiful instrumentals ever to emerge from Brentford Road". A second album, More Creation, was issued in 1971. Hibbert went on to work with Harry Mudie, with the "Margaret's Dream" single issued in 1974. In 1976, he was awarded the Order of Distinction (O.D.) for his contribution to music on the island and for his youth work.

Hibbert died on 8 September 1984 (aged 55). He is commemorated at Alpha by the Lennie Hibbert Hall. He received a posthumous "unsung hero" award from the Jamaican Reggae Industry Association (JARIA) in 2009.

Hibbert was the uncle of reggae singer Junior Delgado.

He also taught music at Ocho Rios Secondary school prior to his death while living in Content Gardens Ocho Rios.

Rappers Earl Sweatshirt and RZA sampled Hibbert's song "Rose Len" for the track "Molasses" on Earl's debut studio album, Doris in 2013.

== Discography ==
=== Albums ===
- Moon-light Party at the Myrtle Bank Hotel (1961), Beach - The Lennie Hibbert Combo
- Creation (1969), Studio One
- More Creation (1971), Studio One

=== Singles ===
- "Pure Sole" (1967), Dr. Bird - Lennie Hibbert & Count Ossie Band
- "Village Soul" (1969), Coxsone
- "Montego Rock" (1971), Studio One
- "Margaret's Dream" (1974), MHA
- "Stick It Up" (1974), Moodisc
- "Ital Vibes" (1974), Moodisc
- "Far Beyond" (2001), Soul Jazz
