= Gaynor =

Gaynor is both a surname and a given name. Notable people with the name include:

== Surname ==
- Adam Gaynor (born 1963), American guitarist
- Barrington Gaynor (1965–2011), Jamaican footballer
- Celia Gaynor (born 2000), American soccer player
- Ciara Gaynor (born 1979), Irish camogie player
- Dave Gaynor, English drummer
- Diego Gaynor, the namesake of Diego Gaynor in Buenos Aires, Argentina
- Gloria Gaynor (born 1943), American singer
- Janet Gaynor (1906–1984), American actress
- Jessie Gaynor (1863–1921), American composer
- John A. Gaynor (1846–1915), American politician in Wisconsin
- Joseph Gaynor (fl. 1974), American rower
- Katie Gaynor (born 1977), Australian baseball player
- Len Gaynor (born 1944), Irish hurling manager
- Len Gaynor (footballer) (1925–2017), English footballer
- Mel Gaynor (born 1960), British musician
- Mitzi Gaynor (born 1931), American actress, singer and dancer
- Pete Gaynor (born 1958), U.S. Administrator of FEMA
- Ross Gaynor (born 1987), Irish footballer
- Tomas Gaynor (born 1991), Australian rapper, singer and songwriter, known professionally as Allday
- Tommy Gaynor (born 1963), Irish footballer
- William Jay Gaynor (1849–1913), mayor of New York City

== Given name ==
- Gaynor Arnold (born 1944), Welsh author
- Gaynor Faye (born 1971), English television actress
- Gaynor Hodgson, British child actress
- Gaynor Hopkins (1951–2026), the birth name of Welsh singer Bonnie Tyler
- Gaynor Lucas, minor character in the BBC soap opera EastEnders
- Gaynor Rowlands (1883–1906), Edwardian actress of Welsh descent

== See also ==
- Gayner, people with this surname
