= Rockfort (Kingston, Jamaica) =

- Community
- Location within Jamaica
- Coordinates: 17°58′30.61″N 76°45′29.7″W
- Country: Jamaica
- City: Kingston
- Constituency: East Kingston

Rockfort is a community in Kingston, Jamaica that is bounded by Long Mountain range to the north, the sea and Springfield Gardens to the south, Mountain View and Rollington Town to the west, and Harbour View to the east.

== History ==
Rockfort was a centre for Jamaican popular music, where it became associated with Rastafari, thanks to the activities of Count Ossie. Others who have performed and lived in the area were Horace Andy, Don Drummond, Johnny Moore, and Tommy McCook. When Captain Sinbad moved to the UK, he named his new enterprise "Rockfort Records".

An enclave for the lower-middle class in the 1950s and 1960s, gang violence began to erupt in the 1980s, and became significantly worse by 2017. In August 2017, a rash of gang violence, crimes, and murder in the area drove some residents to move out of their homes.
