= Anita Mahfood =

Jamaican musical artist (died 1965)

Background information
- Also known as: Margarita; Marguerita
- Born: Kingston, Jamaica
- Died: 2 January 1965 Rockfort, Jamaica
- Genres: Reggae; Rhumba
- Occupations: Singer; Dancer
- Instruments: Vocals
- Years active: 1950s–1965
- Label: Black Swan

Anita "Margarita" Mahfood (died 2 January 1965) was a dancer, actress, and singer in Jamaica. She was called "the famous Rhumba queen" and headlined performances. Her career developed during the ska era, prior to the emergence of reggae, performing and composing Jamaican popular music of that period, which made her one of the early women in Jamaica to write and sing her own material. Mahfood was murdered in 1965, by her boyfriend Don Drummond of the Skatalites band.

== Early life ==
Anita Mahfood was born in Kingston, Jamaica. She had three sisters. Her father was Jad Mahfood, a fisherman. Her family were Syrian-Lebanese-Jamaican, with ancestors who emigrated from Syria and Lebanon to Jamaica in the 1870s to pursue commercial trade.

== Music, life and death ==
Mahfood lived in east Kingston, on Ocean View Avenue. She was married to Ruldolph Bent, a boxer from Belize, with whom she had two children: Christopher and Suzanne.

"Her attraction to Black culture was one thing, but her deep involvement with the Rasta movement and her activities as a rhumba dancer exhibited a certain kind of rebellion...Mahfood did not seem interested in a life of a middle-class light skinned privilege. Instead, she lived a bohemian existence of a rebel, free spirit, and independent woman at a time in Jamaica of the late '50s and early '60s when her behaviour would have been perceived as nonconformist to the extreme."

— Klive Walker, Dubwise: Reasoning from the Reggae Underground, 2005

Starting in the 1950s, Mahfood was a regular in the clubs in Kingston. She frequently performed as a dancer with Count Ossie, who backed her during her performances. Mahfood was scheduled to dance as part of "Opportunity Knocks", a talent showcase at the Ward Theatre in Kingston. Promoter Vere Johns refused to let Count Ossie back Mahfood because he was a Rastafarian, discrimination of this kind being common during the 1950s. Mahfood refused to perform, knowing that if she did not appear Johns would have a lower attendance at the event. Johns eventually relented and Mahfood performed with Count Ossie and his band. The performance ended up being the first that Count Ossie and his band ever had in front of a mainstream audience.

Saxophone player Ferdinand Gaynair said he also had a relationship with her.

In the early 1960s, Mahfood met Don Drummond, trombone player of the Skatalites, at Count Ossie's Rastafarian commune in the Wareika Hills. By the time they met, Drummond had schizophrenia and already self-checked himself into Bellevue Hospital in Kingston twice, due to his mental health. Mahfood and her husband had divorced and she and Drummond started living together. Drummond was physically and mentally abusive to Mahfood. He was easily triggered, attacking her in front of bandmates.

Mahfood released the single "Woman Come" (also called "Woman A Come") on Black Swan in 1964. The single featured the Skatalites as her backing band. The Rastafarian-influenced song is a love letter to Drummond.

On 31 December 1964, Drummond missed the Skatalites' New Year's Eve concert at La Parisienne in Harbour View. That night, Mahfood was working at a club in Rockfort. When she returned home from work at 3:30 AM, Drummond attacked her. He stabbed her in the chest four times, killing her instantly. Drummond went to the local police station and claimed that Mahfood had stabbed herself. When the police arrived at the house, Mahfood was dead on the bed, with the knife still in her body, and her hand shoved inside the bell of Drummond's trombone. Drummond was arrested and was represented by the Skatalites' manager. Drummond was found guilty but criminally insane and was committed to Bellevue Hospital, where he died in 1969.

== Legacy ==
In 2013, Mahfood was honoured by the University of Technology, Jamaica, for her contributions to Jamaican music. In 2016, Herbie Miller gave a presentation on Drummond and Mahfood at the Jamaican Music Museum.

== Discography ==
- "Woman Come" (1964) on Black Swan records

== Filmography ==
- It Can Happen to You (1956)
