= Ferdinand Gaynair =

Saxophone player (died 2021)

- Also known as: Bobby Little Bra
- Born: East Kingston, Jamaica
- Died: Glace Bay, Nova Scotia
- Occupation: Musician
- Instrument: Saxophone
- Award: Jamaica Order of Distinction

Ferdinand "Bobby Little Bra" Gaynair (died 23 June 2021) was a saxophone player from Jamaica who later lived in Canada. He was born in East Kingston in the 1920s. He received an Order of Distinction. He was part of the Alpha Boys School. He played and recorded with various musicians including Count Ossie.

Gaynair married and moved to Canada. His older brother Wilton Gaynair was also a musician.

He said he dated rhumba dancer Margarita Mahfood before Don Drummond dated her. He performed regularly with Drummond and the Skatalites. He lived in Nova Scotia. In the summer of 2002 he performed with the Legends of Ska, a reunion of Ska musicians.

Ferdinand Hagerfield Gaynair of Sydney, Nova Scotia, died at the Glace Bay General Hospital, Glace Bay, on 23 June 2021.

== Discography ==
- "Come Together"
