= William Gaynor (disambiguation) =

William Jay Gaynor was a mayor of New York City.

William Gaynor may also refer to:

- William J. Gaynor (fireboat), a New York Fire Department fireboat

== See also ==
- William Gayner, English cricketer and barrister
