= Gayner =

Gayner is an English surname. Notable people with the surname include:

- Jenny Gayner, English actress, dancer and singer
- Justin Gayner (born 1977), British writer, broadcaster and producer
- William Gayner (c.1825–1892), English first-class cricketer and barrister

== See also ==
- Gaynair, people with this surname
- Gaynor, people with this name
