= Harry Mudie =

Jamaican record producer (born 1940)

- Born: Harry A. Mudie c. 1940
- Origin: Spanish Town, Jamaica

Harry A. Mudie (born 1940 in Spanish Town, Jamaica) is a Jamaican record producer.

== Biography ==
Harry Mudie attended the St Jago High School. In the mid 1950s, he launched his own sound system "Mudies Hi-Fi", before going to the UK to study electronics and photography.

Back in Jamaica in the late 1950s, Mudie began producing, mainly Jamaican R&B records; His first production was "Babylon Gone" (1962) by rasta drummer Count Ossie and saxophonist Wilton Gaynair, released in the UK in 1962 on Blue Beat. He moved away from production in the 1960s, operating his Scaramouch Garden Amusement Center in Spanishtown, opened in 1962. He returned to production in the late 1960s, launching his Moodisc label and working with artists such as Dennis Walks, Winston Wright, Winston Shand, Lloyd Jones, Count Ossie and was the first producer to put I Roy on record. In the early 1970s, Mudie was the first to record the deejay Big Joe. He was the first producer to use string sections in reggae, starting with John Holt's 1973 album Time is the Master. Also in the 1970s, he produced several dub albums with King Tubby (the Dub Conference series). From the mid to late 1970s he had his greatest success, producing artists such as Gregory Isaacs, The Heptones, Joe White, Cornel Campbell and Prince Heron.

Mudie became based in Florida in the 1980s. He has since reissued much of his back-catalogue of productions.

== Discography ==
- The Rhythm Rulers & Mudies All Stars – Book of Drifters (1970), Moodisc
- The Rhythm Rulers – Mudies Mood (1970), Moodisc
- Harry Mudie with King Tubby in Dub Conference Volume 1 (1975), Moodisc
- Harry Mudie with King Tubby in Dub Conference Volume 2 (1976), Moodisc
- Harry Mudie with King Tubby in Dub Conference Volume 3 (1977), Moodisc

Compilations

- Harry Mudie & Friends – Let Me Tell You Boy (1988), Trojan
- Various Artists – Quad Star Revolution Volume 1 (1972)
- Various Artists – Quad Star Revolution Volume 2 (1975)
- Various Artists – Reggae History A-Z Volume 1, Moodisc
- Various Artists – Reggae Jamboree (1972–1992), Moodisc
- Various Artists – Drifting With Mudies All Stars & The Rhythm Rulers (2004), Papa Charlie
- Various Artists – Reggae History Volume 1 (1985), Moodisc
