= Aston Cooke =

Jamaican playwright (1958–2019)

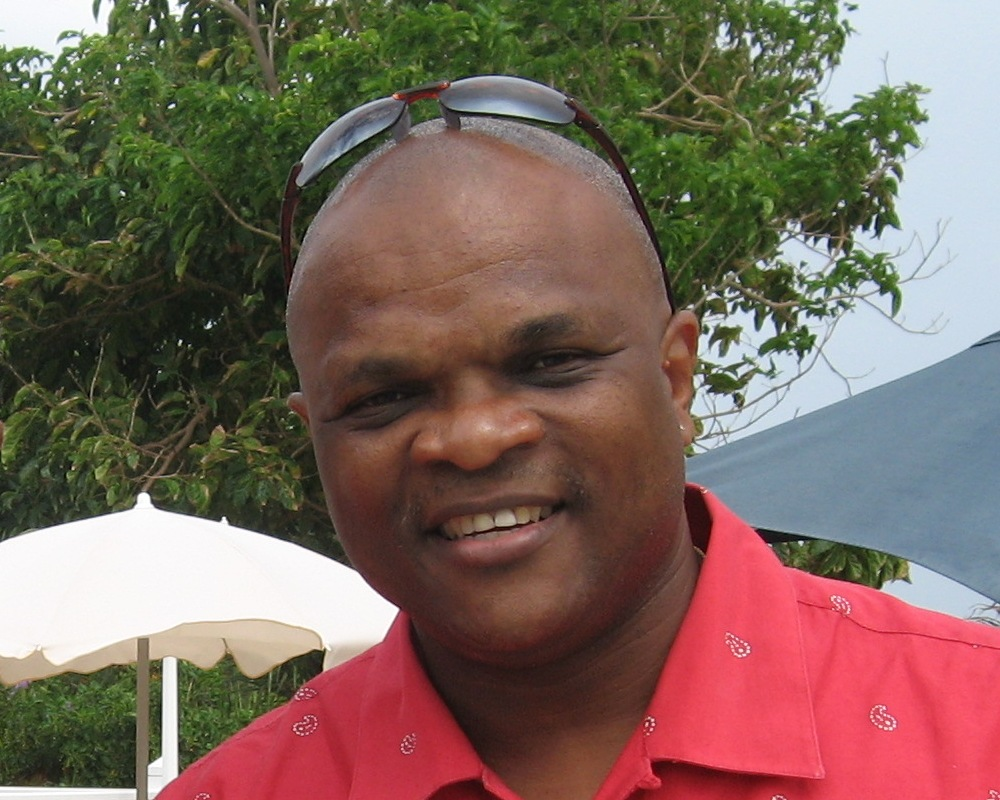
- Born: 5 January 1958; Kingston, Jamaica
- Died: 22 February 2019 (aged 61); Kingston, Jamaica
- Education: Wolmer's Boys' School; University of the West Indies; Ryerson Polytechnic University
- Occupations: Playwright, writer

Aston Cooke (5 January 1958 – 22 February 2019) was one of Jamaica's leading playwrights and the recipient of nine national Actor Boy Awards for outstanding achievement in various categories of theatre in Jamaica. Cooke was an inductee to the Caribbean Hall of Fame for Arts and Culture for his contribution to Jamaican theatre over the years. Cooke served as Chairman of the Jamaica Cultural Development Commission (2013–2016).

== Biography ==
Born in Kingston, Jamaica, Aston Cooke attended All Saint's Primary School in Jones Town, Kingston, and later won a Common Entrance place to enter Wolmer's Boys' School. He began writing plays as a student at Wolmer's as an active participant in the Schools' Drama Festival of Jamaica. His first one-act play, Pickle‚ won several awards for Wolmer's Boys' School in the Jamaica Secondary Schools Drama Festival.

Cooke read for B.A. Mass Communications (1984) and M.A. Communications Studies (2001) at the University of the West Indies and for a BComm in Hospitality and Tourism Management (1993) at Ryerson Polytechnic University in Toronto, Ontario, Canada. He was the recipient of the Canadian Commonwealth Scholarship in 1989.

In 1985, Cooke was responsible for writing the first episodes of Oliver at Large for Jamaica's "King of Comedy" Oliver Samuels‚ which became Jamaica's most successful scripted television series to date. The once-popular radio series Home Runnings‚ presented by the Jamaica National Housing Trust on RJR and LOVE FM, was also written by Cooke.

In 2004, Cooke joined up with young playwright Sabrena McDonald to write the television drama High Grade, which aired on TVJ, CVM and CTV in Jamaica.

Cooke's full-length drama Concubine? (2007) won the Best Actress Award for Dahlia Harris. The play has been performed in Kingston, Montego Bay, Florida, New York City, Cayman Island, Toronto and UK.

In 2009, Aston Cooke won the Best Play award for his entry in the 2009 National Literary Competition staged by the Jamaica Cultural Development Commission (JCDC) at a ceremony held at the Rex Nettleford Hall at the University of the West Indies. Cooke's entry was a full-length manuscript entitled "Jonkanoo Jamboree". The judges' report read: "Where there was understanding of stage craft, use of space and natural dialogue, the characters and story emerged, as in 'Jonkanoo Jamboree', a pantomime script."

Cooke was artistic director of the Jamaica Youth Theatre, a group he founded in 2004 that serves as the performing arm of the Schools' Drama Festival of Jamaica. He led the visionary campaign for the Jamaica Youth Theatre (JYT) to be selected from over 100 companies from 40 countries worldwide and eventually representing the nation at the 2010 "Contacting the World Youth Theatre Festival" in Manchester, England. In November 2015, JYT represented Jamaica at the Caribbean Schools' Drama Festival in Trinidad and Tobago with Cooke's 'Jonkanoo Jamboree' and copped the Best Production Award.

Cooke worked extensively in Marketing Communications, particularly in Public Affairs, Brand Development and Advertising. He served as Director of Boards for several organizations, including Television Jamaica Limited, Jamaica AIDS Support for Life and the Jamaica Cultural Development Commission.

Cooke's book, Country Duppy & Jonkanoo Jamboree (Authorhouse 2014) features two of his most successful stage plays, which serve up a spread of Jamaican and Caribbean traditional cultural forms and demonstrate their relevance in contemporary literature.

== Selected plays ==
- 1984 - Front Room (Golden Dragon Playhouse)
- 1987 - River Mumma and the Golden Table (with Barbara Gloudon) (Ward Theatre)
- 1985 - Children-Children (Little Theatre)
- 1995 - Jamaica Run-Down (Barn Theatre)
- 1996 - Jamaica Pepperpot (Barn Theatre)
- 2000 - Country Duppy (Barn Theatre)
- 2001 - Kiss Mi Neck (Barn Theatre)
- 2003 - Single Entry (Barn Theatre)
- 2005 - Jamaica 2 RAHTID (Barn Theatre)
- 2007 - Concubine? (Common-Law) (Pantry Playhouse)
- 2008 - Jamaica 2 Rahtid - PUPALICK (Pantry Playhouse)
- 2009 - Me and Mi Chapsie (Pantry Playhouse)
- 2012 - Jamaica FIFTY 2 RAHTID (Pantry Playhouse)
- 2013 - Jonkanoo Jamboree (University of the West Indies - PSCCA)
- 2013 - Internet Affair (Pantry Playhouse)
