= Cherry Natural =

Jamaican poet and self-defense instructor

- Born: Marcia Alrica Wedderburn; April 20, 1960
- Occupations: Poet, Writer, Self Defense Instructor
- Awards: Mutabaruka Award for Best Spoken Word Poet

Cherry Natural (born Marcia A. Wedderburn; 1960) is a Jamaican dub poet, author, motivational speaker and self-defense instructor. She has published three books of poetry and in received the Mutabaruka Award for Best Spoken Word Poet at the International Reggae & World Music Awards in 2019.

== Early life ==
Cherry Natural was born April 20, 1960, as Marcia Alrica Wedderburn in Saint Andrew Parish. Her father nicknamed her 'Cherry' because of her skin tone as an infant and as an adult added 'Natural' as a nod to holistic living. She spent the first six years of her life in Darliston with her grandmother Hilda, who influenced Cherry's interest in storytelling.

== Career ==
Cherry's poetry focuses on the everyday experiences of Jamaican life. Louise Bennett-Coverley is among her influences. Cherry has worked closely with Poet Laureate of Jamaica, Lorna Goodison who said of her book the Lyrical Contortionist, "Cherry Natural's powerful new strong-woman anthems are guaranteed to strengthen and lift up the fallen. They are crafted with the prevision of Martial Arts moves...to the point, with maximum impact and skillful loves turns and surprises." Natural has also worked with Jamaican poet Malachi Smith to visit students across Jamaica to spread the word about the importance of poetry. As reported in the Jamaica Daily Observer, Retired Poet Laureate Professor Mervyn Morris described Cherry as a "'rhythmic warrior poet' whose versus are 'enlivened by clever rhyme, wit and sarcasm." In 2019 she was awarded the Mutabaruka Award for Best Spoken Word Poet at the International Reggae & World Music Awards.

=== Self-defense instruction ===
A certified martial arts instructor, Cherry has a black belt in martial arts. In 2008, Cherry lead a series of workshops at IU Bloomington covering self-defense, creative writing, and performance poetry.

In 2017 and 2018, Cherry worked with Lorna Goodison to create the program All Flowers Are Roses. The program taught self-defense skills and poetry to girls aged 11-14. The program was offered in collaboration with the National Library of Jamaica. Loop News Jamaica quoted Denzil, then Secretary in the Jamaican Ministry of Culture, Gender, Entertainment and Sport as saying: "The coupling of the two disciplines is a unique approach to develop self-awareness, discipline and confidence. It is necessary to encourage Jamaica’s young women to stand up for each other and defend themselves through their words and actions."

== Writing ==
- Come meck we reason: A collection of inspirational poems (1989)
- Earth Woman (2003)
- The Lyrical Contortionist (2018)

In addition to her own poetry collections, her work appeared in a collection edited by Afua Cooper, Utterances and incantations: women poetry and dub (1999). Her writing was also studied as part of a PhD thesis analyzing the creative processes of dub poets, Mapping Creative Interiors: Creative Process Narratives and Individualized Workscapes in the Jamaican Dub Poetry Context by John D. Galuska.

== Albums ==
- Earth Woman
- Intellectual Bad Gal (2013)
- Self Mastery (2021)

== Performances ==
- Musicality of Poetry Series X, Chopin Theatre, 2001-09-26
- Verse vs Verse, Poetry Society of Jamaica/National Association of Teachers of English, CXC, Edna Manley College Amphitheatre, 2011-08-19
- Rastafari Arts & Kulcha Festival, Downsview Park, 2014-08-23
- Entitled Woman Rising, Poetry Society of Jamaica March Fellowship, 2015-03-31
- Lyrical Hotsteppers, Aunty Roachy Festival, Independence Village, 2015-08-03
- Love Affair with Literature 9, University of the West Indies, 2020-03-01
- Sistas of D Ankh and Ma'at Sisterhood Circle, via Zoom, 2021-04-25

== Awards ==
- Queens of Reggae Island Honorary Ceremonies Award (2019)
- Mutabaruka Award for Best Spoken Word Poet (2019)
