= National Housing Trust =

Housing trust in Jamaica

- Formation: 1 January 1976
- Type: National trust
- Region served: Jamaica
- Revenue: $43.061 billion JMD (FY 2024)
- Expenses: $12.946 billion JMD (FY 2024)
- Website: https://www.nht.gov.jm/

The National Housing Trust (NHT) is managed by the Government of Jamaica. The trust finances and constructs housing in Jamaica.

== Function ==
The NHT finances and constructs housing in Jamaica. It was proposed as a financial institution. The trust is the largest source of mortgages in the nation. The trust invests in several companies. From 2018 to 2022, the NHT completed around 2,100 houses per year.

== History ==
The NHT was founded in 1976 with the National Housing Trust Act. It was proposed in October 1975 by Michael Manley, Prime Minister of Jamaica.

In the aftermath of Hurricane Melissa in 2025, the trust purchased 5,000 container homes to aid with rapid recovery. A six-month-long moratorium on mortgages was also issued for 20,000 properties.

== See also ==
- Housing and Development Board — similar organization in Singapore
