= Barbara Gloudon =

Jamaican journalist and scriptwriter (1935–2022)

Barbara Gloudon OJ, OD, IOJ
- Born: Barbara Joy Goodison; 5 February 1935; Malvern, Saint Elizabeth Parish, Colony of Jamaica, British Empire
- Died: 11 May 2022 (aged 87); Kingston, Jamaica
- Other names: Stella; Kitty Kingston
- Education: St Andrew High School for Girls; University of Iowa
- Occupations: Journalist, playwright, theatre chair
- Years active: 1953–2022
- Known for: Journalism
- Spouse: Ancile Gloudon (m. 1960–2022)
- Children: 3
- Relatives: Lorna Goodison (sister)

Barbara Joy Gloudon OD OJ IOJ (née Goodison; 5 February 1935 – 11 May 2022) was a Jamaican writer. She received two Seprod Awards from the Press Association of Jamaica and Order of Distinction. Gloudon was a scriptwriter for Jamaica's Little Theatre Movement (LTM) and wrote radio drama. She hosted a radio talk show for thirty years and became chair of the LTM. She was granted the Order of Jamaica in 1992 and became a fellow of the Institute of Jamaica in 2012.

== Early life ==
Barbara Joy Goodison was the eldest of nine siblings, born in Malvern, Saint Elizabeth Parish, Jamaica, to Doris (née Harvey) and Vivian M. Goodison. Her father worked as a chauffeur and mechanic and Goodison grew up in a middle-class family. Barbara attended St. George's Elementary School and went on to further her education at St Andrew High School for Girls in Kingston, as well as completing an international writing studies programme at the University of Iowa. While in high school, she participated in theatrical performances and studied drama with Jean Watson. Her sister, Lorna, went on to become the first female Poet Laureate of Jamaica.

== Career ==
In 1953, Goodison began her career at The Gleaner newspaper, working as a reporter, and writing for the paper's social pages under the pseudonym "Kitty Kingston". Simultaneously, she wrote the column "Stella Seh" at the Jamaica Star, where she used Jamaican patois for the first time in a newspaper.

On 23 April 1960, Goodison married chemist and food technologist Ancile Gloudon, a native of Port of Spain, Trinidad. The couple had three children – Lisa, Jason and Anya. She worked as a features editor, editor and reporter at both The Gleaner and The Star until 1978. In 1964, the inaugural year of the Seprod Awards for Journalism, and again in 1968, Gloudon won recognition from the Press Association of Jamaica. One of the regular beats she covered was the arts and theatre. Showing a particular talent for reporting on the cast, as well as the event, Gloudon was invited by the government to cover the art revolution in Britain in the 1960s.

In 1969, she spent a month in the United Kingdom. Greta and Henry Fowler had founded Jamaica's Little Theatre Movement (LTM) and they invited Gloudon to write a script for the annual pantomime production. Marking that year's Moon landing, Gloudon wrote Moonshine Anancy, a turning point for LTM's Jamaican-led works. She was honoured as an officer in the Order of Distinction in 1975 for her journalistic services.

Leaving journalism in 1978, Gloudon worked until 1981 as the director of the Jamaica Tourist Board and then opened her own public relations firm. From the late 1980s until 2015 she hosted the radio talk-show, Hotline, broadcast by Radio Jamaica Rediffusion (RJR 94 FM). In addition to her broadcasting and writing, Gloudon travelled regionally discussing Caribbean themes, and specifically focused on the cultural and socio-economic concerns of women.

In the 1990s, Gloudon became the chair of the LTM and directed the annual Boxing Day debut of the National Pantomime. In 1992, Gloudon received the Order of Jamaica, which was recognized at the Caribbean Media Awards ceremony hosted by the Caribbean Publishing and Broadcasting Association and Caribbean Broadcasting Union. She was elected as vice-chair of the International Programme for the Development of Communication (IPDC) in 1996 and served until 1998, when she was elected IPDC's rapporteur. She was re-elected as rapporteur in 2000.

Gloudon was awarded the 2006 Gleaner Honour for her contributions to art and culture. In 2012, she and Sylvia Wynter were elected as fellows of the Institute of Jamaica. Gloudon was inducted into the Jamaican Press Association Hall of Fame in 2013, continuing to write as a journalist for The Jamaica Observer in addition to her role at the LTM.

== Death and legacy ==
Gloudon died on 11 May 2022, aged 87, in Kingston, 11 days after she had been widowed. She is remembered for her long-running talk show, Hotline, and other programmes on Radio Jamaica, her work as a playwright, and her production and writing for the Annual Pantomime programme.

== Selected awards and recognition ==
- 1975: Officer in the Order of Distinction for her journalistic services
- 1992: Order of Jamaica
- 2006: Gleaner Honour Award for her contributions to art and culture
- 2012: Elected a Fellow of the Institute of Jamaica
- 2003: Honorary doctorate from the University of the West Indies
- 2013: Inducted into Jamaican Press Association Hall of Fame
- 2015: Special Lifetime Achievement Award, for her unparalleled service to journalism, Press Association of Jamaica Awards

=== Scripts ===
- 1969: Moonshine Anancy
- 1972: Hail Columbus
- 1975: The Witch
- 1978: Johhny Reggae
- 1981: The Pirate Princess
- 1983: Ginneral B
- 1985: Trash
- 1986: River Mumma and the Golden Table, in conjunction with Aston Cooke
- 1989: Schoolers, based on a scene by Owen Ellis and Michael Nicholson
- 1990: Fifty Fifty
- 1990: A Carol for Moneybags, an adaptation of Charles Dickens' A Christmas Carol
- 1991: Man Deh Yah
- 1992: Reggae Son
- 1993: Anansi Come Back
- 1994: Moonsplash
- 1995: Schoolers 2
- 1998: Anansi Web
- 1999: Bugsie the Millennium Bug, in collaboration with Conliffe Wilmot-Simpson
- 2001: Chicken Merry—Hawk Deh Near, in collaboration with the Pantomime Workshop
- 2002: Miss Annie
- 2003: Combolo
- 2004: Iffa Nuh So
- 2005: Zu-zu Macca
- 2006: Howzzat
- 2013: The Golden Macca Fat
- 2014: Princess Boonoonoonoos
- 2015: Runeesha and the Birds
- 2016: The Upsies and Downsies
- 2017: Dapper Dan

=== Other media ===
- 1980s: Wrong Move, radio serial drama
- 1991: Stella seh. Kingston, Jamaica: Institute of Jamaica Publications. 1991. ISBN 978-9-768-01713-0.
