= Waterloo House =

Coordinates: 18.0249°N 77.8512°W

- Interactive map of the Waterloo House area
- Alternative names: Waterloo Guest House

General information
- Status: Destroyed
- Architectural style: Georgian
- Location: Black River, Jamaica, 44 High Street
- Year built: 1819
- Destroyed: October 2025

Website
- www.waterlooguesthouseja.com

The Waterloo House was the first private house in Jamaica to be lit by electricity. It was located in Black River, Jamaica. The house was built in 1819 and was named in honor of the Battle of Waterloo for a branch of the Shakespeare family. John William Leydon is reported to be the first owner of the house. Leydon's sons were the ones to install electricity in the house. The house was bought in 1938 by Ferdinand Stewart. The Waterloo House became a guest house in 1972. It was destroyed by Hurricane Melissa in October 2025.

== See also ==
- Solar power in Jamaica
