= Mary Ignatius Davies =

Jamaican nun (1921–2003)

Sister Mary Ignatius Davies
- Born: Mary Davies; 18 November 1921; Innswood, Saint Catherine Parish, Jamaica
- Died: 9 February 2003 (aged 81); Kingston, Jamaica
- Occupations: Nun, teacher

Sister Mary Ignatius Davies (18 November 1921 – 9 February 2003) was a Sister of Mercy and inspirational music teacher known for her work at the Alpha Boys School.

== Career ==
Born Mary Davies in Innswood, Saint Catherine Parish, Jamaica, Davies was baptised at the St. Joseph's Roman Catholic Church in Spanish Town, and went to the St. Catherine Elementary School. After her family moved to Kingston, she attended Mico Elementary School and later the Alpha Academy, the girls' high school attached to the Alpha Boys School. She joined the Sisters of Mercy on 1 February 1939, aged 17, taking the name Ignatius, and lived at the school for the remainder of her life.

She inspired many musicians from the Alpha school to become professional musicians, including future Skatalites Tommy McCook, Don Drummond, and Johnny "Dizzy" Moore, as well as trombonist Rico Rodriguez and Leslie Thompson, who went on to become the first black conductor of the London Symphony Orchestra. She contributed to Island Rock, a documentary series broadcast in 2002 on BBC Radio 2 to mark the 40th anniversary of Jamaican independence.

Sister Mary Ignatius had a large record collection that was the envy of many pupils at the Academy, and was a huge fan of blues and jazz. For many years she operated a sound system on Saturday afternoons at the school, which attracted people from surrounding areas.

While best known for the musicians she taught, she was also involved in teaching football, cricket, boxing, table tennis, and dominoes at the school.

In 1996 she was awarded the Badge of Honour for services to Jamaica.

She died at the University Hospital of the West Indies, Jamaica, on 9 February 2003, aged 81, after suffering a heart attack the day before.

== Book ==
In November 2017, authors Heather Augustyn and Adam Reeves published their book, Alpha Boys' School: Cradle of Jamaican Music, from Half Pint Press. The book, much of which focuses on the key role of Sister Ignatius, chronicles over 40 musicians who attended the school and contains interviews and photographs of many of the alumni.

Reviewing the book, London’s Black History journal reflects on a biographical narrative of “musicians who against a backdrop of extreme poverty, gun culture, street gangs and an urban civil war, attained virtuoso musicianship to create their own sonic revolution”, going on to report that “Alpha saved ( Jamaican youth) from challenging early life circumstances by giving them the gift of music”, describing Sister Mary Ignatius as “the remarkable nun who ran the music department at Alpha Boys School for 64 years, inspiring generations of young men to make music their occupation”, noting that she was "(f)amed for operating her own bass-heavy sound system where she would play her collection of the hippest jazz, R&B and ska 45s,” and that “Sister Ignatius was adored by her boys and remained friends with them throughout their lives, wherever they were in the world. She is true (sic) Godmother of Ska and Reggae”.
