= Len Gaynor (footballer) =

English footballer

Personal information
- Full name: Leonard Alfred Gaynor
- Date of birth: 22 September 1925
- Place of birth: Ollerton, England
- Date of death: 26 September 2017 (aged 92)
- Place of death: Bournemouth, England
- Position: Inside forward

Senior career*
Years	Team	Apps	(Gls)
- Giltbrook Villa
- Ilkeston Town
- Brinsley
194?–1948	Eastwood Colliery		
1948–1951	Hull City	2	(0)
1951–1954	Bournemouth & Boscombe Athletic	51	(12)
1954–1955	Southampton	12	(1)
1955–1957	Aldershot	62	(9)
1957–1958	Oldham Athletic	5	(0)
1958–19??	Yeovil Town		
- Cambridge City
- * Club domestic league appearances and goals

Leonard Alfred Gaynor (22 September 1925 – 26 September 2017) was an English professional footballer who made 132 appearances in the Football League playing as an inside forward for Hull City, Bournemouth & Boscombe Athletic, Southampton, Aldershot and Oldham Athletic. He also played non-league football for Giltbrook Villa, Ilkeston Town, Brinsley, Eastwood Colliery, Yeovil Town and Cambridge City.

Gaynor was born in Ollerton, Nottinghamshire, in 1925 and died in Bournemouth, Dorset, in 2017 at the age of 92.
