= Bethel Town, Jamaica =

Settlement in Jamaica

Coordinates: 18.301°N 77.953°W

Location of Bethel Town in Westmoreland, Jamaica

Bethel Town is a settlement in Jamaica. It was the site of political riots in 1938 and was a former slave village.
