= Wilton Gaynair =

Jamaican jazz musician (1927–1995)

Wilton "Bogey" Gaynair (11 January 1927 – 13 February 1995) was a Jamaican-born jazz musician, whose primary instrument was the tenor saxophone. "Blue Bogey", "Kingston Bypass" "Debra", and "Wilton Mood" are among his better known tunes.

== Life and career ==
Born in Kingston, Jamaica, Gaynair was raised at Kingston's Alpha Boys School, where fellow Jamaican musicians Joe Harriott, Harold McNair and Don Drummond were also pupils of a similar age.

Gaynair began his professional career playing in the clubs of Kingston, backing such visitors as George Shearing and Carmen McRae, before travelling to Europe in 1955, deciding to base himself in Germany because of the plentiful live work on offer. He recorded very seldom, only three times as a bandleader. Two of those recordings came during visits to England, 1959's Blue Bogey (1959) on Tempo Records and Africa Calling (1960), also recorded for Tempo but unreleased until 2005 on account of that label's demise.

Soon after recording these sessions, he returned to Germany, where he remained based for the rest of his life. He concentrated on live performance with such bands as the Kurt Edelhagen Radio Orchestra – including playing at the opening ceremony of the 1972 Summer Olympics in Munich, also being involved in extensive session work. He was a guest artist on Alfred Haurand's Third Eye (LP 1977) but only recorded one more jazz album under his own name, Alpharian (1982). Among the many artists he played performed with include Gil Evans, Freddie Hubbard, Shirley Bassey, Manhattan Transfer, Horace Parlan, Bob Brookmeyer, and Mel Lewis.

== Personal life ==
In September 1983, Gaynair suffered a stroke during a concert, and from then until his death in 1995 he was unable to play the saxophone. Gaynair died on 13 February 1995 in Cologne, Germany, aged 68.

He was survived by a younger brother Bobby Gaynair, who is an Alpha Boys School alumnus and saxophone player. Bobby was involved in the early Jamaican recording industry, recording alongside Dizzy Moore and Roland Alphonso in the group Clue J & His Blues Blasters. Bobby Gaynair performed at Legends of Ska concert series in Toronto during the summer of 2002.

== Discography ==
=== As leader ===
- 1959: Blue Bogey – Tempo Records
- 1960: Africa Calling, also recorded for Tempo but unreleased until 2005
- 1982: Alpharian

=== As sideman ===
With Charly Antolini

- 1968: Soul Beat – Charly Antolini (drums), Wilton Gaynair (tenor saxophone, flute), Jiggs Whigham (trombone), Shake Keane (trumpet, flugelhorn), Jean Warland (bass), Werner Dies (bass), Karlheinz Kästel (guitar), Francis Coppieters (piano), MPS Records

With Dieter Reith:

1975 Knock Out

MPS records

Arranged By, Electric Piano [Fender Rhodes], Organ [String], Synthesizer, Piano, Producer – Dieter Reith

Bass [Fender] – Dave King

Congas – Sabu Martinez

Drums – Todd Canedy

Tenor Saxophone, Soprano Saxophone – Wilton Gaynair
