= Jamaica Customs Agency =

Governmental agency of Jamaica

- Formation: 1877
- Type: Border guard
- Region served: Jamaica
- Website: www.jca.gov.jm

The Jamaica Customs Agency (JCA) is the national agency tasked with managing customs in Jamaica. It was founded in 1877. In the 2010s, it was transitioned into becoming an executive department of Jamaica.

== History ==
In 1877, the JCA was formed from an act to enforce imports related to an act passed in 1867.

Around 2010, the JCA began to transition into becoming an executive department under Bruce Golding.

In the 2020s, the JCA permitted contactless clearance for objects for objects valued at less than US$5,000. It was challenged in 2024 by the Customs Brokers and Freight Forwarders Association of Jamaica under the basis that contactless clearance would allow for the JCA to physically inspect imports, which is the function of the association. On 1 September 2023, a immigration and customs declaration was made madatory with the JCA and Jamaica Passport, Immigration and Citizen Agency enforcing it.
