= Long Mountain (Jamaica) =

Mountain in Jamaica

Coordinates: 17°59′3.53″N 76°44′58.84″W

Long Mountain is a mountain on the outskirts of Kingston, Jamaica. Parts of it are also known as Wareika or Wareika Hills. It has been the site of a residence and later a Rastafarian commune of Count Ossie. Nyabinghi drummers from his Camp David commune have been featured on recordings, including a popular version of Oh Carolina.

== See also ==
- Man from Wareika
