= William Gayner =

English cricketer and barrister

Personal information
- Full name: William Charles Gayner
- Born: c. 1825; St James's, Middlesex, England
- Died: 27 January 1892 (aged 66/67); Chelsea, London, England
- Batting: Unknown

Domestic team information
- Years: Team
- 1851: Marylebone Cricket Club

Career statistics
Competition	First-class
Matches	1
Runs scored	1
Batting average	0.50
100s/50s	–/–
Top score	1
Catches/stumpings	–/–
- Source: Cricinfo, 22 September 2021

William Charles Gayner (c. 1825 — 27 January 1892) was an English first-class cricketer and barrister.

The son of William Gayner senior, he was born at St James's in 1825. He was educated at St Paul's School, before going up to the University of Oxford where he studied at Pembroke College in 1847, before transferring to St Mary Hall in 1848. Gayner made a single appearance in first-class cricket for the Marylebone Cricket Club (MCC) against Oxford University at Oxford in 1851. Batting twice in the match, he was dismissed for a single run by Charles Marsham, while in their second innings he was dismissed without scoring by Charles Bere. A latecomer to the legal profession, Gayner was called to the bar as a member of the Inner Temple in January 1872. Gayner died at Chelsea in January 1892. He had been the proprietor of Boodle's gentlemen's club until his death.
