= Alpha Boys' School =

Location
- 26 South Camp Road; Kingston 4 Jamaica; 17.9770187°N 76.7813712°W

Information
- Motto: Upward and Onward
- Religious affiliation: Christian
- Denomination: Roman Catholic
- Established: 1880
- Gender: Boys

Alpha Cottage School (often referred to as Alpha Boys' School, Convent of Mercy "Alpha" Academy and now called Alpha Institute) was the name of the vocational residential school on South Camp Road in Kingston, Jamaica, still run by Roman Catholic nuns. Established in 1880 as a "school for wayward boys", it became renowned for both the discipline it instilled in its pupils and the outstanding musical tuition they received. In 2014 Alpha's residence closed and the school continued as Alpha Institute to focus on educational and vocational training for inner city unattached youth.

== School band ==
The school band was formed in 1892. It was originally a drum and fife corps, and later a brass band, following the gift of brass instruments from the Roman Catholic Bishop of Jamaica. The school has been credited with influencing the development of ska and reggae. Its music instructors have included Lennie Hibbert, Ruben Delgado and Sparrow Martin.

Sister Mary Ignatius Davies, an alumnus of the Alpha Academy next door, is recognized as a factor in the strength of Alpha's program and that of Jamaican music more broadly.

The Alpha Alumni Ensemble is composed of former students of the school who are now professional musicians.

== Alpha self help programs ==
The school has a long history with trying to be self-sufficient. Older trades such as tile making, tailoring and farming had a direct impact on sustaining the school, were part of the vocational culture of the school and opportunities to work. Self-help now includes wood working, screen printing, digital print services and music performance.

In April 2013, Alpha Boys' School launched a new clothing project to support the school with two tee shirt designs by Michael Thompson (aka Freestylee: Artist Without Borders) and equipment provided by Digicel Jamaica. Alpha's tee shirts include designs for the Jamaica Sound System Federation & Active fashion India.

== Notable alumni ==
Notable alumni, all musicians, include:

- Theophilus Beckford
- "Deadly" Headley Bennett
- Jo Jo Bennett
- Cedric Brooks
- Albert "Apple Gabriel" Craig
- Bobby Ellis
- Winston Francis
- Ferdinand Gaynair
- Wilton Gaynair
- Vin Gordon
- Owen Gray
- Richard Hall
- Joe Harriott
- Lennie Hibbert
- Bertie King
- Floyd Lloyd
- David Madden
- Harold McNair
- Johnny Osbourne
- Dizzy Reece
- Rico Rodriguez
- Noel Simms
- Four founding members of the Skatalites:
  - Don Drummond
  - Tommy McCook
  - Johnny "Dizzy" Moore
  - Lester Sterling
- Leroy Smart
- Keith Sterling
- Leslie Thompson
- Eddie "Tan Tan" Thornton
- Trinity
- Leroy "Horsemouth" Wallace
- Yellowman

== Alpha Boys' School Radio ==
Alpha Boys' School Radio is the school's 24/7 online radio station. Featuring music performed by Alpha's alumni, including jazz stalwarts of the 1950s and 1960s like Joe Harriott and Dizzy Reece, ska pioneers the Skatalites, Cedric 'Im' Brooks and Rico Rodriguez; Vin Gordon; Leroy Smart and Leroy 'Horsemouth' Wallace; and Winston 'Yellowman' Foster. Every February, Alpha Boys' School Radio hosts the Reggae Auction to benefit social services for Alpha students.

== Book ==
In November 2017, authors Heather Augustyn and Adam Reeves published their book, Alpha Boys' School: Cradle of Jamaican Music, from Half Pint Press. The book chronicles over 40 musicians who attended the school and contains interviews and photographs of many of the alumni.

Reviewing the book, London’s Black History journal reflects on a biographical narrative of “musicians who against a backdrop of extreme poverty, gun culture, street gangs and an urban civil war, attained virtuoso musicianship to create their own sonic revolution”, going on to report that “Alpha saved ( Jamaican youth) from challenging early life circumstances by giving them the gift of music”, describing Sister Mary Ignatius as “the remarkable nun who ran the music department at Alpha Boys School for 64 years, inspiring generations of young men to make music their occupation”, noting that she was "(f)amed for operating her own bass-heavy sound system where she would play her collection of the hippest jazz, R&B and ska 45s,” and that “Sister Ignatius was adored by her boys and remained friends with them throughout their lives, wherever they were in the world. She is true (sic) Godmother of Ska and Reggae”.
