= Count Ossie =

Jamaican Rastafari drummer and band leader

Background information
- Born: Oswald Williams; 26 March 1926
- Origin: St. Thomas, Jamaica
- Died: 18 October 1976 (aged 50)
- Genres: Reggae
- Occupation: Musician
- Instrument: Akete
- Years active: late 1950s-1976

Count Ossie, born Oswald Williams (26 March 1926 – 18 October 1976), was a Jamaican Rastafari drummer and band leader.

== Biography ==
In the early 1950s, he set up a Rasta community in Rockfort near Wareika Hill on the east side of Kingston, where many of Kingston's musicians learned about the Rastafari movement. In the late 1950s, he (with other percussionists) formed the Count Ossie Group.

According to reggae historian Bruno Blum, the Rasta "nyabinghi" style of hand drumming, which derives from Jamaican Kumina traditions, has its roots in Bantu traditions from Eastern Congo.

According to the book The First Rasta by Hélène Lee, because of their Rastafarian beliefs Count Ossie and his team were violently rejected from the then anti-Rasta music establishment and outlawed, as most Rastafarians were. It was not until around 1959, when successful dancer Margarita Mahfood, a Jamaican rumba dancer of Lebanese descent who enjoyed their new style and liked to dance to it, demanded that Count Ossie and his group be part of her major Ward Theater show. Vere John Jr. also resisted at first but at Mahfood's insistence had no other choice but to have them on his Opportunity Hour show at the Carib theater. Both shows were successful and opened new doors to Count Ossie and the Wareikas right away.

Their first sound recordings were made after meeting Prince Buster, who produced a Wareikas-backed song by the Folkes Brothers, "Oh Carolina", done at the Jamaican Broadcasting Corporation (JBC) Studios in 1959. The B-side was "I Met a Man". Although both songs were recorded in the then-current style of rhythm and blues widely recorded in the US as well as Jamaica, it does include some early Rasta hand drumming not found on any previous R&B records, and is regarded by some music historians as one of the first-ever ska record.

During this period Count Ossie also recorded for producers Harry Mudie and Coxsone Dodd. Several singles as Count Ossie and the Wareikas, including "African Shuffle" as well as "Chubby" and "Rock a Man Soul" with vocal group The Mellow Cats, were produced by Harry Mudie circa 1961 featuring saxophonist Ferdinand 'Bobby' Gaynair and trombonist Rico Rodriguez, and were released on the Jamaican label Moodies at the time (some were licensed to Emil Shalit's UK label Blue Beat and released in England in the early 1960s). Count Ossie later formed a group called The Mystic Revelation of Rastafari and recorded a few singles, including a cover of Miriam Makeba's "Pata Pata" in 1967.

Several Jamaican artists also used Ossie's group as percussionists for their own ska and reggae recordings, such as a couple of King Stitt singles, including "Be a Man" (Studio One) circa 1969.

Count Ossie issued two outstanding albums at the end of his lifetime and inspired several later Rastafarian drumming groups, including Ras Michael and the Sons of Negus, who recorded with Bob Marley. Count Ossie's masterpiece is the Grounation three-LP set (1973), which includes songs such as "So Long", and "Grounation" (the latter title with over 30 minutes running time) and an updated version of "Oh Carolina". Two years later Tales Of Mozambique (Dynamic 1975) was issued, continuing the legacy of the first album.

Count Ossie died in a road accident on 18 October 1976, aged 50. His group, The Mystic Revelation of Rastafari, lived on, toured and recorded a few albums into the 1990s.

== Discography ==
- Grounation (Ashanti 1973)
- Tales Of Mozambique (1975)
- Man From Higher Heights (1983)
- Remembering Count Ossie: A Rasta Reggae Legend (Moodies 1996)
