= Don Drummond =

Jamaican ska trombonist and composer

Background information
- Born: 12 March 1934; Kingston, Jamaica
- Died: 6 May 1969 (aged 35) Kingston, Jamaica
- Genre: Ska
- Instrument: Trombone
- Years active: 1950–1965
- Formerly of: The Skatalites

Don Drummond (12 March 1934 – 6 May 1969) was a Jamaican ska trombonist and composer. He was one of the original members of The Skatalites, and composed many of their tunes. In 1966, Drummond was convicted of murdering his 23-year-old lover, Anita "Marguerita" Mahfood.

== Biography ==
Drummond was born at the Jubilee Hospital in Kingston, Jamaica, to Doris Monroe and Uriah Drummond. He was educated at Kingston's Alpha Boys School, where he later tutored his younger schoolmate Rico Rodriguez playing the trombone.

His musical career began in 1950 with the Eric Dean's All-Stars where he performed jazz. He continued playing with big bands into the 1960s at clubs such as the Big Bucket and the Silver Slipper.

After performing jazz for a decade, Drummond began performing ska and in 1964 he joined The Skatalites. With Drummond's politicized conversion to the Rastafari movement, other band members followed his lead. He became a household name in Jamaica, before suffering mental health problems. It has been said that pianist George Shearing rated him as being among the world's top five trombone players.

On 2 January 1965, Drummond's live-in lover, Anita "Marguerita" Mahfood, was found dead with four stab wounds to the chest. Drummond reported to the police that Mahfood had stabbed herself, but, in 1966, he was found guilty of her murder. Drummond was ruled criminally insane and imprisoned at Bellevue Asylum, Kingston, where he remained until his death four years later. The official cause of death was "natural causes", possibly heart failure caused by malnutrition or improper medication, but other theories were put forward; some of his colleagues believed it was a government plot against the Kingston musical scene, and some believed that he was killed by gangsters as revenge for the murder of Mahfood. Heather Augustyn, author of a biography of Drummond published in 2013 claimed to have proved that Drummond's death was caused by his medications.

== Legacy ==
Drummond performed in Haiti, at least twice, with the Eric Deans Orchestra. Drummond is considered one of Jamaica's all-time great musicians.

In 2013, a ballet telling the story of Drummond's life was performed by the National Dance Theatre Company of Jamaica. Created by Clive Thompson, the ballet is titled Malungu, which was Mahfood's pet name for Drummond.

In 2013 a comprehensive biography of Don Drummond was published by McFarland Publishing. Don Drummond: The Genius and Tragedy of the World's Greatest Trombonist by Heather Augustyn features a foreword by Delfeayo Marsalis.
