= Mista Savona =

Australian musician and producer

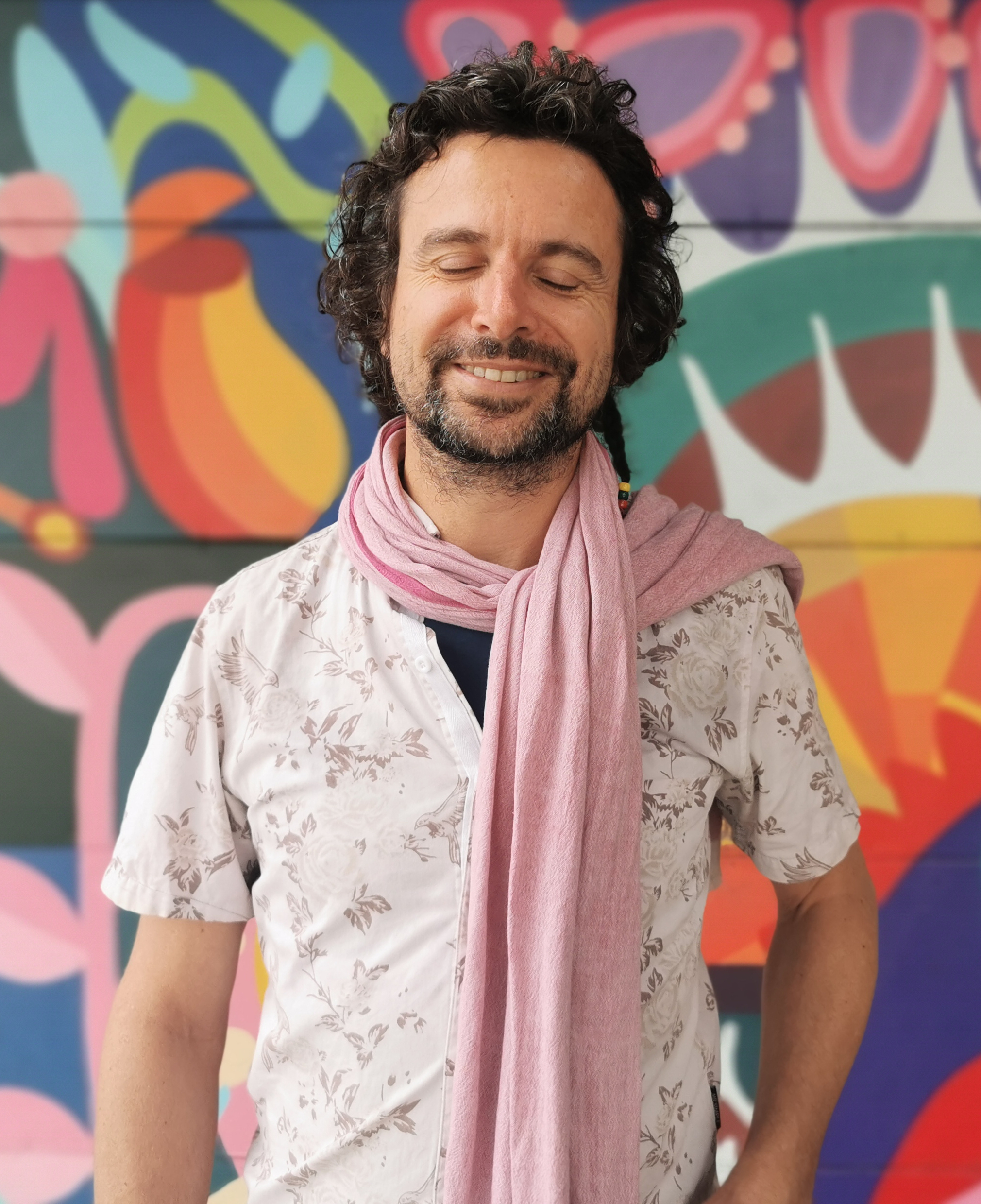
- Savona in 2021

Background information
- Born: Jake Dominic Savona
- Origin: Melbourne, Victoria, Australia
- Genres: Reggae, dancehall, hip hop
- Years active: 2007-present
- Labels: Muti Music, Elefant Traks, Soulbeats, ABC Music, VP Records, Baco Records and Cumbancha
- Website: www.mistasavona.com.au

Jake Dominic Savona, known professionally as Mista Savona, is an Australian reggae, dancehall, and hip-hop producer and keyboardist based in Melbourne.

== Career ==
In 2007, his self-produced album Melbourne Meets Kingston was released by Elefant Traks. The 21-track album was recorded in Jamaica and Australia, and features Anthony B, Determine, and Big Youth. In 2009, he released the "Fire Dragon" riddim, featuring Sizzla, Burro Banton, and Vida-Sunshyne. It was followed in 2011 with the release of the studio album Warn the Nation, which was recorded in the UK, Jamaica, Australia, and Africa. Warn the Nation features Capleton, Sizzla, Horace Andy, Alton Ellis, and Burro Banton.

Other releases include two solo albums, Invasion Day and Bass & Roots, and Born a King, a full-length album with Sizzla. The single "I'm Living", taken from this album, was remixed by Gaudi.

In 2017, Savona released the album Havana Meets Kingston, a collaboration between Cuban and Jamaican musicians. The album featured Jamaican rhythm section Sly and Robbie, guitarist Ernest Ranglin, and original members of Buena Vista Social Club, Los Van Van, and Irakere. International tours followed, including a live performance at the Royal Albert Hall in London for the BBC Proms. The performance received a positive review in The Times.

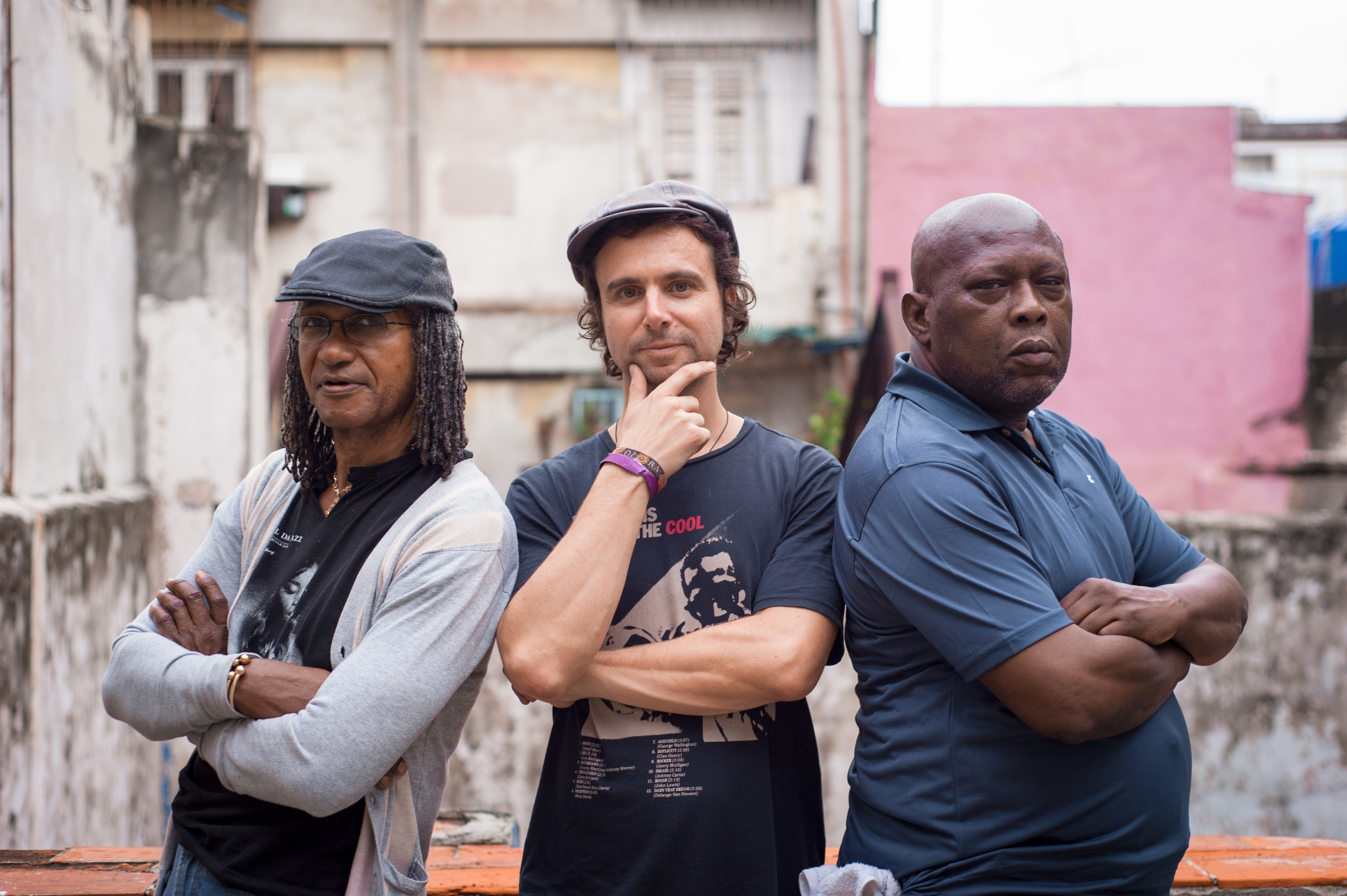
Sly Dunbar, Jake Savona and Robbie Shakespeare in Cuba in 2015

Jake Savona in Melbourne, 2007

== Discography ==
=== Albums ===
Title	Details		
Title	Details	Invasion Day	Released: 2004; Label: Mista Savona; Formats: CD
Melbourne Meets Kingston	Released: 2007; Label: Elefant Traks (ACE029); Formats: CD, 2×LP		
Warn the Nation	Released: 2010; Label: Elefant Traks (ACE053); Formats: CD, LP, Digital		
Born a King	Released: 2014; Label: Muti Music (MUTI164); Formats: CD, Digital		
Havana Meets Kingston	Released: November 2017; Label: ABC Music (56700381); Formats: CD, 2×LP, Digital		
Havana Meets Kingston Part 2	Released: June 2022; Label: ABC Music; Formats: CD, Digital		

== Awards and nominations ==
=== ARIA Music Awards ===
Year	Nominee / work	Award	Result	Ref.
2019	Havana Meets Kingston	Best World Music Album	Nominated	
2022	Havana Meets Kingston Part 2	Best World Music Album	Nominated	
