= Wayne Jarrett =

Jamaican reggae singer

- Born: Wayne Jarrett; 1956 (age 69–70); Kingston, Jamaica
- Origin: Allman Town, Jamaica
- Genres: Reggae
- Occupation: Singer
- Instrument: Vocals
- Years active: Late 70s – present
- Labels: Greensleeves Records, Jah Life Records,

Wayne Jarrett (born 1956) is a Jamaican reggae musician born in Kingston, Jamaica, and raised in Allman Town, Jamaica. He currently resides in the United States in Hartford, Connecticut.

== Biography ==
=== Early life ===
Wayne Jarrett was born in 1956 in Kingston, Jamaica, one of seven children. He was raised as a Rastafarian and grew up in Rachford Park, Allman Town. As a child, he was friends with fellow reggae singer Horace Andy.

Jarrett's voice caught the attention of his high-school teacher, who persuaded him to join the school choir. In 1973, he moved to Hartford, Connecticut, with his parents. His mother had wanted him to move out of Kingston so he did not get involved with the wrong crowd. Jarrett got a part-time job while attending school and used his earnings to buy a turntable, amplifier and microphone.

=== Career ===
However, the reggae scene in Connecticut at the time was in its infancy and most people preferred to listen to blues in social situations. Jarrett performed at a West Indian social club and tried to become one of the first reggae artists to make it from Connecticut. A friend by the name of "Belltone", who operated a local record store, took him to New York City to record some tracks. It was there Jarrett met Lloyd Barnes, who produced his first studio recording, "African Woman". Jarrett then returned to Jamaica to record his second track, "Satta Dread" (the dub mix of which was later released on a King Tubby compilation). After recording the track, Jarrett went to Idler's Corner, in Chancery Lane, to try to find a producer and officially get signed to a label.

While at Chancery Lane he met Jah Stitch, who at that time was not involved in the record industry. Later on, Jarrett recorded with Dynamic Studios. Jarrett left the label shortly after.

== Discography ==
=== Albums ===
- Train To Zion Dub (1981), Tuff Gong (With Linval Thompson & Ranking Trevor)
- What's Wrong with the Youths (1981), Jah Life
- Chip In (1982), Greensleeves
- Showcase Vol I (a.k.a. Bubble Up) (1982), Wackies
- Inner Circle (1984), Ashantites

Compilations

  - Horace Andy Meets Naggo Morris + Wayne Jarrett – Mini Showcase (2002), Wackie's
