= Midnight Scorchers =

Studio album by Horace Andy
- Released: 16 September 2022
- Studio: On-U Soundcastle (Ramsgate, England)
- Length: 39:12
- Label: On-U Sound
- Producer: Adrian Sherwood

Horace Andy chronology
Midnight Rocker (2022)	Midnight Scorchers (2022)	Timeless Roots (2024)

Midnight Scorchers is a studio album by Jamaican singer-songwriter Horace Andy. It was released on 16 September 2022 through On-U Sound Records. It received generally favorable reviews from critics.

== Background ==
Midnight Scorchers is a dub version of Midnight Rocker (2022). It contains reworked versions of songs from Midnight Rocker, as well as songs from the Midnight Rocker sessions that did not make it onto the album. It is produced by Adrian Sherwood. It features guest appearances from Daddy Freddy and Lone Ranger on vocals.

== Critical reception ==
Professional ratings
Aggregate scores
Source	Rating
Metacritic	76/100
Review scores
Source	Rating
AllMusic	3.5/5 stars
Mojo	4/5 stars
Punknews.org	4/5 stars
Uncut	7/10

According to the review aggregator Metacritic, Midnight Scorchers received "generally favorable reviews" based on a weighted average score of 76 out of 100 from 5 critic scores.

Nick Hasted of Uncut commented that Midnight Rocker "reaffirmed Horace Andy's regal reggae status earlier this year, irrespective of his latter-day Massive Attack fame." He added, "Its producer Adrian Sherwood now completes the picture with this sound-system-style refashioning, breaking tracks open, resetting them in eerie dubscapes, as with the title track's rough, warping synths, and adding session off-cuts." Simon McEwen of Mojo stated, "If April's slick Midnight Rocker album was a post-Studio One career high for reggae legend Horace Andy, then this dubbed-up companion LP even takes it up a notch."

== Track listing ==
Midnight Scorchers track listing
No.	Title	Writer(s)	Length
1.	"Come After Midnight"	H. Hinds	4:26
2.	"Midnight Scorcher"	B. Cobham; R. Del Naja; S. Nelson; A. Vowles	4:54
3.	"Away with the Gun and Knife"	D. Gaudi; R. Johnson; L. Kenny	3:35
4.	"Dirty Money Business"	A. Maxwell; J. Nichols; L. V. Scott	3:43
5.	"Sleepy's Night Cap"	H. Hinds	2:59
6.	"Feverish"	H. Hinds	4:09
7.	"Ain't No Love in the Heart of the City"	M. Price; D. Walsh	3:35
8.	"Dub Guidance"	B. Llewellyn; E. Morgan; L. Sibbles	4:30
9.	"More Bassy"	H. Hinds	3:34
10.	"Hell and Back"	H. Hinds	3:47
Total length:			39:12

== Personnel ==
Credits adapted from liner notes.

- Horace Andy – vocals
- Gaudi – steel guitar, piano, celesta, Rhodes piano, Hammond organ, Clavinet, synthesizer
- Skip McDonald – lead guitar, horn arrangement
- Crucial Tony – lead guitar, rhythm guitar
- Alan Glen – mouth organ
- Style Scott – drums
- Prisoner – drums, programming
- Ivan "Celloman" Hussey – cello (1, 2, 5, 7), saxophone (9)
- George Oban – bass guitar (1, 3, 5–10)
- Douglas Wimbish – bass guitar (2, 4)
- Daddy Freddy – vocals (2, 4, 9)
- Cyrus Richards – melodica (2, 5, 10)
- Paul Booth – lead saxophone (3, 4, 6), clarinet (3, 4, 6)
- Richard Doswell – saxophone (3, 4, 7, 8, 10)
- Dave Fulwood – trumpet (3, 4, 7, 8, 10)
- Chris Petter – trombone (3, 4, 7, 8, 10)
- Lone Ranger – vocals (8)
- Horseman – percussion, drums (10)
- Adrian Sherwood – production
- Matthew Smyth – engineering, programming
- David McEwen – engineering, programming
- Frank Merritt – mastering
- Ruff Mercy – artwork
- Michael Moodie – photography
- Jaffa – layout

== Charts ==
Chart performance for Midnight Scorchers
Chart (2022)	Peak position
Scottish Albums (OCC)	58
UK Album Downloads (OCC)	15
UK Independent Albums (OCC)	17
