= Brissett =

Brissett is a surname. Notable people with the surname include:

- Annette Brissett, Jamaican reggae singer
- Jacoby Brissett (born 1992), American football player
- Jason Brissett (born 1974), English footballer
- Oshae Brissett (born 1998), Canadian basketball player
- Trevor Brissett (1961–2010), English footballer

== See also ==
- Kenneth Bressett (born 1928), American numismatist
