= Serious Times =

Serious Times may refer to:

- Serious Times (Horace Andy album), 2010
- Serious Times (Luciano album), 2004
