= Gaudi (musician) =

Anglo-Italian musician (born 1963)

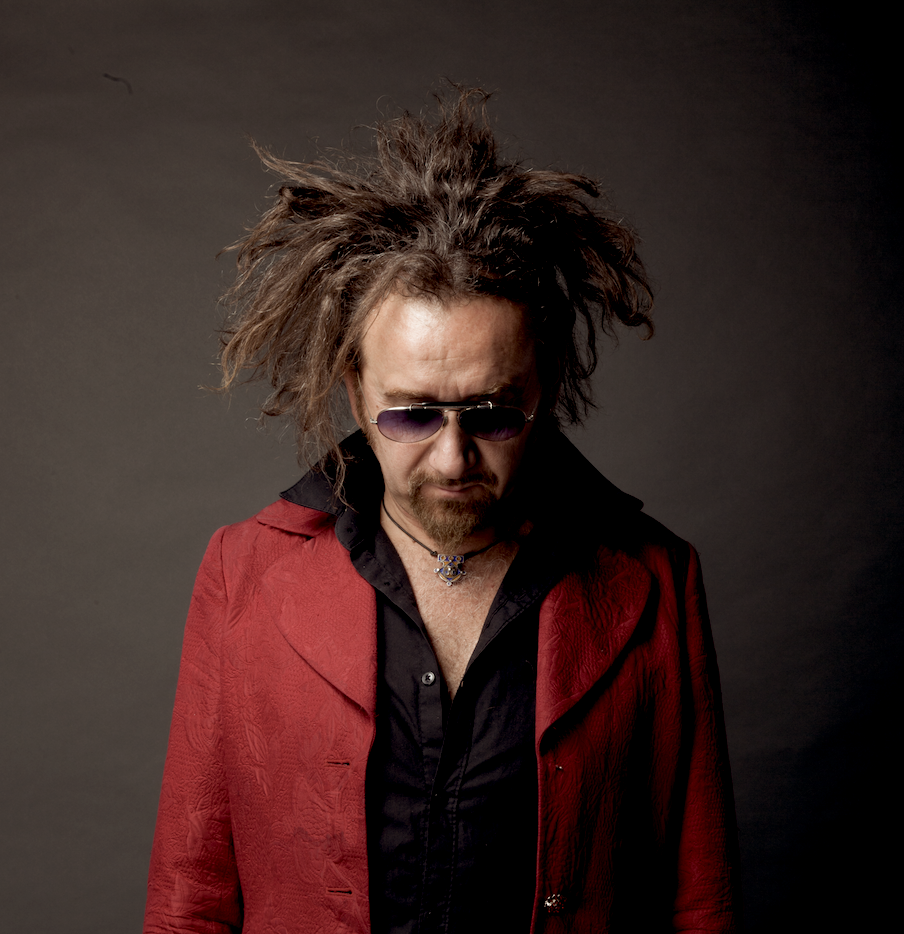
- Gaudi in 2016

Background information
- Also known as: Lele Gaudì; Dub Alchemist; Mad Master Moog
- Born: Daniele Gaudi Cenacchi; 12 July 1963 (age 63); Bologna, Italy
- Genres: Dub; reggae; electronica; world music; breakbeat
- Occupations: Musician; songwriter; record producer
- Instruments: Theremin; moog; piano; keyboards; melodica
- Years active: 1981–present
- Labels: Polygram; Mercury; Six Degrees; Interchill; FAX; Em:t; RareNoiseRecords
- Member of: Phonolab
- Formerly of: Wild Planet; Red Light; Violet Eves; Bamboo Company; Raptus; Orchestral World Groove; Weirdub; SCREEN; Lab Dub; Gaudi Kosmisches Trio; Marree Men
- Website: gaudimusic.com

Daniele Gaudi Cenacchi (born 12 July 1963), known mononymously as Gaudi, is an Anglo-Italian musician and record producer who has been active since the 1980s. He is known for performing in a variety of musical genres, including dub, electronica, reggae, and worldbeat.

== Biography ==
=== Early career: Italy (1981–1995) ===
Gaudi began his musical career in 1981 as a keyboardist for underground bands such as Wild Planet, Red Light, Violet Eves, and Bamboo Company. He eventually founded Raptus—one of the first Italian-language hip‑hop acts—and co-created the production team Tubi Forti, known for their work with Isola Posse All Stars, Sud Sound System, and Donatella Rettore.

In 1987, he adopted the pseudonym Lele Gaudì, under which he released his first single, "Malinconico Love". His debut album, Basta Poco, came out in January 1991. In 1992, he collaborated with Ricky Gianco on the single "Anche un vagabondo". In 1993, he issued Gaudium Magnum, this time under the name Gaudi. He also began to incorporate the theremin into his compositions, integrating its distinctive sound into dub and psychedelic music. This experimental phase led to the release of several singles under the pseudonym Dub Alchemist, including "Retrospective", in 1996.

=== London (1995–present) ===
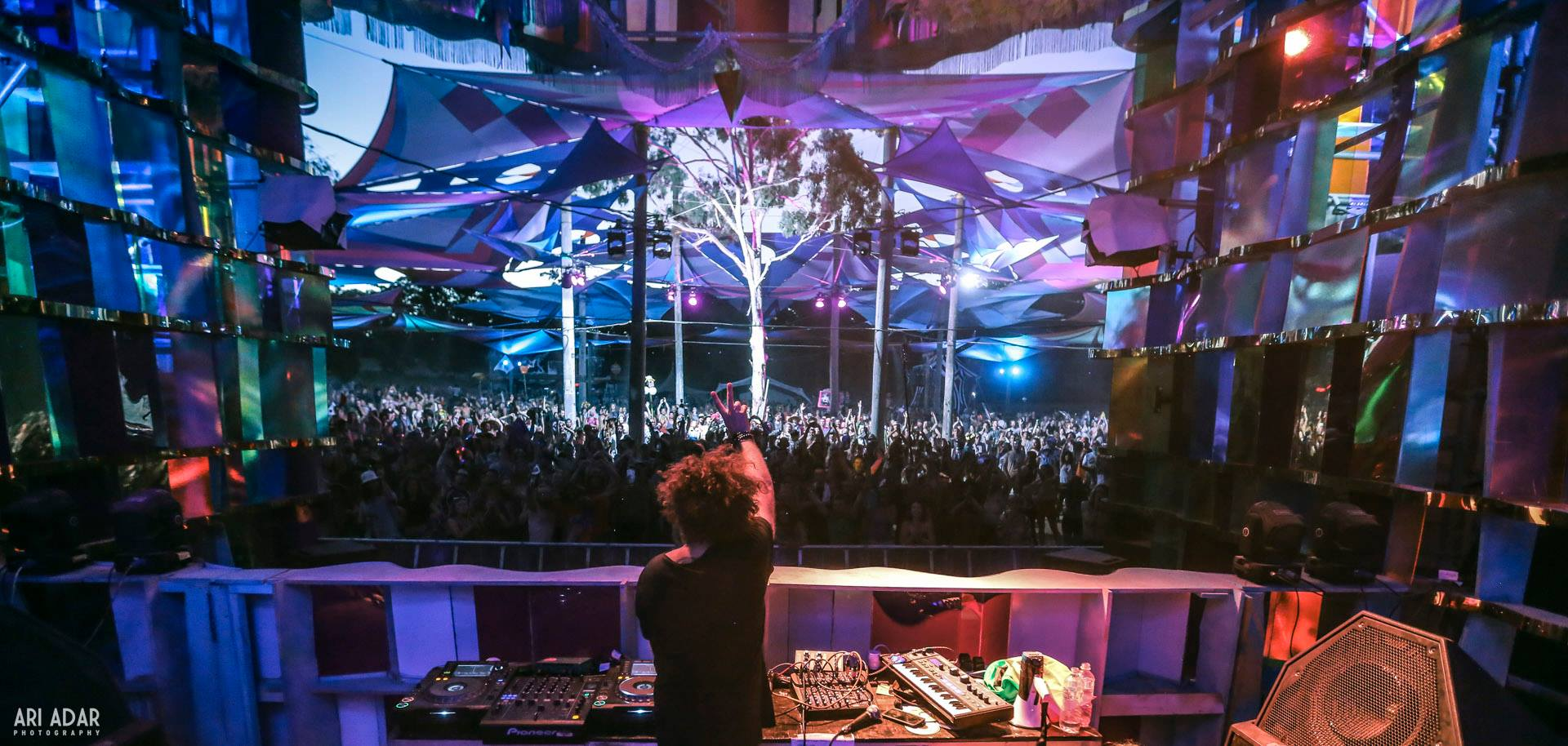
Gaudi performing at Rainbow Spirit Festival, Victoria, Australia, in 2017

In 1995, Gaudi relocated to London, England, where he founded his own record label, Sub Signal Records, and began working on his third album, Earthbound, which came out in 1999. In 1998, under the moniker Mad Master Moog, he released the single "Cadillac Kitsch". In 2000, he contributed theremin and moog parts to Elisa's album Asile's World. The Italian singer-songwriter later added vocals to the song "Brainwashed Again" on Gaudi's 2010 album, No Prisoners. Gaudi additionally formed the project Orchestral World Groove together with the English DJ Pathaan, releasing several singles under the moniker.

In 2002, Gaudi, along with Cosimo Keita, wrote music for a stage adaptation of Hanif Kureishi's My Beautiful Laundrette, which he later released as an album on his own label. The same year, he issued the album Recreational under the moniker Weirdub, together with Luca Gatti and Paolo Polcari. In 2004, he issued Bass, Sweat & Tears. Gaudi:Testa 1105, a collaboration with Antonio Testa, followed in 2005. A year later, Gaudi released Re:sonate, a collaboration with German producer Pete Namlook.

In 2007, he wrote, produced, mixed, and contributed music to Ashtech's solo album, Walkin' Target. The same year, he released the compilation Sub Signals Vol.1 as well as the studio record Dub Qawwali, together with Pakistani musician Nusrat Fateh Ali Khan, for which they received a nomination at the 2008 BBC Radio 3 Awards for World Music. His 2010 album, No Prisoners, released by Six Degrees Records, featured collaborations with Michael Franti, Bunny Wailer, Ashtech, and the aforementioned Elisa, among others. In 2011, he formed the project SCREEN with the Orb's Alex Paterson and vocalist Chester Taylor, releasing the album We Are Screen! a year later.

In 2012, Gaudi issued the double compilation album Everlasting, which featured tracks by the Orb, System 7, SCREEN, Mad Professor, Pete Namlook, Trentemøller, Shpongle, Alan Parsons, and Lamb, among others. His 2013 album, In Between Times, included contributions from Michael Rose, Lee "Scratch" Perry, and the Orb. In 2014, to mark the tenth anniversary of Bass, Sweat & Tears, Six Degrees Records released a dub reinterpretation of the album, titled Dub, Sweat & Tears. The same year, Gaudi issued the remix album In Between Times – Remixed, featuring mixes by Zion Train, Dub Pistols, Banco de Gaia, Kaya Project, Deep Forest, Perfect Stranger, and Joujouka, among others.

In 2016, Gaudi collaborated with Youth on the EP 2063: A Dub Odyssey, which they followed with the full-length Astronaut Alchemists in 2018. In 2017, he released Magnetic, and in 2018, he contributed music to the Orb's album No Sounds Are Out of Bounds and collaborated with Deep Forest on Epic Circuits. The same year, Gaudi performed several shows as part of a supergroup led by Scott Page of Pink Floyd, with members of Jane's Addiction, Fishbone, Kid Rock, and others, performing Pink Floyd reinterpretations and original compositions.

In 2019, Gaudi contributed songwriting and keyboards to Lee "Scratch" Perry's albums Rainford and Heavy Rain. He also released the collaborative album Mad Professor Meets Gaudi, and as part of the duo Lab Dub with Hardage, he issued a series of EPs under the title Ennio Morricone in Dub. In 2020, he contributed to the Orb's album Abolition of the Royal Familia as well as its dub version, Abolition in Dub. That year, he released the record 100 Years of Theremin (The Dub Chapter), featuring Mad Professor, Adrian Sherwood, Scientist, Dennis Bovell, and Prince Fatty. In 2021, he issued Future Relic together with Grouch and remixed Big Audio Dynamite's 1986 track "E=MC2" for the compilation album Late Night Tales Presents Version Excursion.

In 2022, Gaudi appeared on Horace Andy's albums Midnight Rocker and Midnight Scorchers; released the compilation Sub Signals Vol.2; issued his second collaborative album with Youth, titled Stratosphere; and finally, he released published Havana Meets Kingston in Dub, a collaborative album with Australian musician Mista Savona, featuring Cornel Campbell, Prince Alla, Leroy Sibbles, Lutan Fyah, and Ernest Ranglin, among others. In 2023, he produced and co-wrote Outta Sync, the debut album by Don Letts. In 2024, he contributed to the Orb's Prism and to Creation Rebel's Hostile Environment. He also formed the Gaudi Kosmisches Trio with bassist Colin Edwin (Porcupine Tree) and guitarist Pippo De Palma, releasing Torpedo Forward, an album that blended krautrock and dub influences. He also issued the single "Mind the Gap" with Alex Paterson, under the moniker Marree Men.

In 2025, Gaudi released Theremin Homage to the Smiths and launched the collaborative project Phonolab with Eraldo Bernocchi. Their debut album, Disturbia, featured guest appearances by Gerald Casale, Mark Stewart, Bill Laswell, and Flowdan, among others. In August, he collaborated with Italian DJ Daniele Baldelli on the EP The Bright Side of the Moog. The same year, Phonolab issued Ganja Provides the Answer (Gaudi Remix), featuring Flowdan. In August 2025, Gaudi collaborated with Italian DJ Daniele Baldelli on the EP The Bright Side of the Moog, a joint release blending cosmic disco, dub, and Afro-electronic influences.

== Selected discography ==
=== Lele Gaudì ===
- Basta Poco (1991)

=== Gaudi ===
- Gaudium Magnum (1993)
- Earthbound (1999)
- My Beautiful Laundrette with Cosimo Keita (2002)
- Bass, Sweat & Tears (2004)
- Gaudi:Testa 1105 with Antonio Testa (2005)
- Re:sonate with Pete Namlook (2006)
- Remixes EP (2007)
- Sub Signals Vol.1 (compilation, 2007)
- Dub Qawwali with Nusrat Fateh Ali Khan (2007)
- Dub Qawwali Remixes with Nusrat Fateh Ali Khan (2008)
- No Prisoners (2010)
- Larana with Sisio (EP, 2011)
- Everlasting (compilation, 2012)
- In Between Times (2013)
- Dub, Sweat & Tears (2014)
- In Between Times (The Remixes) (2015)
- 2063: A Dub Odyssey with Youth (EP, 2016)
- Electronic Impromptu in E-flat Minor (EP, 2016)
- Magnetic (2017)
- Epic Circuits with Deep Forest (2018)
- Astronaut Alchemists with Youth (2018)
- Earthbound in Dub (2018)
- Remixes 1995–2020 (25 Years Special Edition) (2018)
- Mad Professor Meets Gaudi with Mad Professor (2019)
- 100 Years of Theremin (the Dub Chapter) (2020)
- Astronaut Alchemists Remixes with Youth (2020)
- The Lost DAT Tapes (DAT 1) (compilation, 2020)
- Future Relic with Grouch (2021)
- Karma (Is Unforgiving and Always Gets Payback) (compilation, 2021)
- Sub Signals Vol.2 (compilation, 2022)
- Stratosphere with Youth (2022)
- Havana Meets Kingston in Dub with Mista Savona (2023)
- Raha with Savana Funk (EP, 2024)
- Theremin Tribute to the Smiths (2025)
- The Bright Side of the Moog with Daniele Baldelli (EP, 2025)
- Jazz Gone Dub (2025)

=== Dub Alchemist ===
- "Retrospective" (single, 1996)

=== Mad Master Moog ===
- "Cadillac Kitsch" (single, 1998)

=== Weirdub ===
- Recreational (2002)

=== SCREEN ===
- We Are Screen! (2012)

=== Lab Dub ===
- Ennio Morricone in Dub – The Good, the Dub and the Ugly (EP, 2019)

=== Gaudi Kosmisches Trio ===
- Torpedo Forward (2024)

=== Marree Men ===
- "Mind the Gap" (single, 2024)

=== Phonolab ===
- Disturbia (2025)
