= Dance Hall Style =

Studio album by Horace Andy
- Released: 1982
- Recorded: c. 1982
- Studios: Lloyd & Lloyd's Pro Inc. (N.Y.)
- Genres: Roots reggae; smooth reggae; dub music; lovers rock
- Length: 41:01
- Label: Wackie's
- Producer: Bullwackie

Dead Moon chronology
Unity Showcase (1981)	Dance Hall Style (1982)	Confusion (1984)

Dance Hall Style is the eighth studio album by Jamaican roots reggae songwriter and singer Horace Andy, released in 1982 by reggae and dub music record label Wackie's.

== Background ==
In the late 1970s, Andy and his wife relocated to Connecticut, and a few years later, he and Bullwackie met at the latter's studio, and made recordings of what would evolve into Dance Hall Style. At the time, Bullwackie had founded a record label called Wackie's, which never achieved mainstream success in its home country (United States), but was very influential in Jamaica.

Dance Hall Style's was slower, deeper, and darker, with synthesizers having a secondary influence on Andy's voice. A track from the album, "Spying Glass", tackles racism and intolerance, while another track, "Cuss Cuss", contains the production of piano, organ, and synth tracks turned into a three-way dance and three basslines of a 10-ton rhythm.

"Lonely Woman" is an early song Andy cut for Derrick Harriott in 1972, "Cuss Cuss" is a cover of Lloyd Robinson’s 1969 local hit, and "Spying Glass" would be remixed by trip hop band Massive Attack on their second studio album. Protection.

== Critical reception ==
Professional ratings
Review scores
Source	Rating
AllMusic	4.5/5 stars

Dance Hall Style was released in 1982 by Wackie's to generally positive reviews. According to an AllMusic review by Jo-Ann Greene, "Andy's own powerful 'Stop the Fuss,' a new number, tackles the same topic, but adds a strong unity message that Robinson's 'Cuss Cuss' decidedly lacked. That's a theme the singer revisits on the emotive 'Let's Live in Love,' with Andy's delicate delivery beautifully intertwining with the equally delicate and intricate roots reggae riddim."

== Track listing ==
All tracks are written by Horace Andy, except for "Cuss Cuss".

Dance Hall Style track listing
No.	Title	Length
1.	"Money Money"	6:17
2.	"Lonely Woman"	6:25
3.	"Cuss Cuss"	7:06
4.	"Stop the Fuss"	7:16
5.	"Spying Glass"	5:12
6.	"Let's Live in Love"	8:45
Total length:		41:01

== Personnel ==
- Drums - Oral Cooke, Henry "Snowhite" Seth, Junior Delahaye
- Bass - Jah T, Horace Andy, Myrie Dread
- Rhythm Guitar - Horace Andy, Toney Alien
- Lead - Jah T, Horace Andy
- Piano & Organ - Myrie Dread, Owen Stuart
- Percussion - Ras Menilik
- Executive Producer - Lloyd & Lloyd's Pro Inc.
- Produced by Bullwackie
- Distribution by Wackie's Bx. N.Y.
