= Annette Brissett =

Jamaican reggae singer

- Born: Jamaica
- Genres: Reggae
- Occupation: vocalist
- Instruments: Vocals, drums, keyboards
- Years active: Early 1970s–present

Annette Brissett is a Jamaican reggae singer.

== Biography ==
Brissett was born in Jamaica and sang in church as a child as well as learning drums from her brother, before moving with her family to New York City at the age of twelve. In the early 1970s, she began her career as a drummer, playing with the all-girl reggae band Steppin'Razor and supporting visiting Jamaican singers. She also began a singing career, working with producer Lloyd Barnes and his Bullwackies or Wackies label. One of the visiting singers that she worked with was Marcia Griffiths, and inspired by Griffiths' group the I Threes, Brissett formed Sistren in the mid-1980s. Brissett also wrote "I Shall Sing", which became a hit for Griffiths. Her debut solo album, Love Power, was released in 1986, but failed to make an impact, and she relocated to Miami. She continued to record and perform with further albums released in the 1980s and 1990s, including the 1992 album Annette, recorded with Sly & Robbie.

Brissett became an important part of the Miami reggae scene and has worked with several top Jamaican singers including Hopeton Lindo, Marcia Griffiths, and Beres Hammond, with whom she had a number one single on the South Florida reggae chart with the duet "There For You".

In 2006, Jamaican visual artist Errol "Elgo" Lewis exhibited a collection of 25 paintings inspired by the songs of Brissett at the African-American Research Library and Cultural Center (AARLCC) in Fort Lauderdale, Florida.

== Discography ==
- Love Power (1986), Wackies
- Gun Shooting Raw (1987), Sastan – Annette Brissett and Sistren
- Get up and Dance (1991), Zodiac/VP
- Annette (1992), Imp/RAS
- Name of Life (2002), JVC Victor
- Lift Your Head Up (2010), TAC
