= Midnight Rocker =

Studio album by Horace Andy
- Released: 8 April 2022
- Studio: On-U Soundcastle (Ramsgate, England)
- Genre: Reggae
- Length: 38:05
- Label: On-U Sound
- Producer: Adrian Sherwood

Horace Andy chronology
Live It Up (2019)	Midnight Rocker (2022)	Midnight Scorchers (2022)

Midnight Rocker is a studio album by Jamaican singer-songwriter Horace Andy. It was released on 8 April 2022 through On-U Sound Records. It received universal acclaim from critics.

== Background ==
For Midnight Rocker, Horace Andy worked with producer Adrian Sherwood for the first time. It contains new versions of Andy's earlier songs, as well as new songs. It also includes a cover of Massive Attack's song "Safe from Harm".

A dub version of the album, titled Midnight Scorchers, was later released in 2022.

== Critical reception ==
Professional ratings
Aggregate scores
Source	Rating
Metacritic	84/100
Review scores
Source	Rating
AllMusic	4.5/5 stars
The Guardian	5/5 stars
Mojo	4/5 stars
MusicOMH	4/5 stars
Uncut	7/10

According to the review aggregator Metacritic, Midnight Rocker received "universal acclaim" based on a weighted average score of 84 out of 100 from 7 critic scores.

Fred Thomas of AllMusic commented that "Midnight Rocker benefits from thoughtful song selection and Sherwood's restrained but personality-heavy production, but at the center of it all is Andy's unmistakable voice." He added, "The quiet intensity, supernatural control, and disquieting character of his singing are all in full focus, adding mystery and longing to even the most benign lyric and making the highlights of Midnight Rocker rank among his best work." Simon McEwen of Mojo stated, "This is not only Horace Andy's best album in 40 years, but it is also a work of lasting power."

Bernie Brooks of The Quietus called the album "a worthy, maybe even essential, addition to both Horace Andy and Adrian Sherwood's massive catalogues." He added, "It's not perfect, but there's a strange vitality in its imperfection, and that energy, that vitality – whatever it is – is incredibly compelling." Ben Devlin of MusicOMH commented that "Horace Andy is clearly an artist not content to rest on his laurels, and with this album he strengthens his position as a bona fide reggae legend." Pat Carty of Hot Press stated, "If Andy has been ever so slightly been relegated to sideman status in the decades since Blue Lines, Midnight Rocker puts him back out front, where he belongs."

=== Accolades ===
Year-end lists for Midnight Rocker
Publication	List	Rank	Ref.
Hot Press	50 Best Albums of 2022	31	
Mojo	50 Best Albums of 2022	4	
Uncut	Best New Albums of 2022	32	

== Track listing ==
Midnight Rocker track listing
No.	Title	Writer(s)	Length
1.	"This Must Be Hell"	H. Hinds	3:33
2.	"Easy Money"	A. Maxwell; J. Nichols	3:54
3.	"Safe from Harm"	B. Cobham; R. Del Naja; G. Marshall; S. Nelson; A. Vowles	4:52
4.	"Watch Over Them"	D. Gaudi; R. Johnson; L. Kenny	3:32
5.	"Materialist"	H. Hinds	3:52
6.	"Today Is Right Here"	A. Maxwell; J. Nichols; G. Oban	3:58
7.	"Try Love"	A. Maxwell; J. Nichols; G. Oban	4:10
8.	"Rock to Sleep"		3:02
9.	"Careful"	L. Kenny; A. Maxwell	2:58
10.	"Mr. Bassie"	H. Hinds	4:00
Total length:			38:05

== Personnel ==
Credits adapted from liner notes.

- Horace Andy – vocals
- Gaudi – steel guitar, piano, celesta, Rhodes piano, Hammond organ, Clavinet, synthesizer, backing vocals (5)
- Crucial Tony – rhythm guitar
- Prisoner – drums, programming
- Horseman – percussion
- Skip McDonald – lead guitar (1–3, 8, 10)
- George Oban – bass guitar (1, 4, 6–8)
- Alan Glen – mouth organ (1, 5, 9)
- Richard Doswell – saxophone (1, 6)
- Chris Petter – trombone (1, 6)
- Dave Fulwood – trumpet (1, 6)
- Dr. Pablo – melodica (2)
- Douglas Wimbish – bass guitar (2, 3)
- Ivan "Celloman" Hussey – cello (3, 7, 8), saxophone (10)
- Style Scott – drums (4, 5, 7)
- Adrian Sherwood – production
- Matthew Smyth – engineering, programming
- David McEwen – engineering, programming
- Frank Merritt – mastering
- Michael Moodie – photography
- Jaffa – layout

== Charts ==
Chart performance for Midnight Rocker
Chart (2022)	Peak position
Austrian Albums (Ö3 Austria)	65
Scottish Albums (OCC)	26
UK Album Downloads (OCC)	12
UK Independent Albums (OCC)	7
