= Skylarking (Horace Andy album) =

Studio album by Horace Andy
- Released: 20 April 1972
- Studio: Jamaican Recording Studio, Kingston
- Genre: Reggae
- Length: 34:01
- Label: Studio One
- Producer: Coxsone Dodd

Horace Andy chronology
Skylarking (1972)	You Are My Angel (1973)

2015 remaster cover

Skylarking is the debut studio album by Horace Andy. It was released on Studio One in 1972. Not to be confused with his later greatest hits compilation, also titled Skylarking, released in 1996. The backing band was Sound Dimension - Coxsone Dodd's studio band, led by Leroy Sibbles.

The cover photo depicts the artist with his guitar in front of the "Memorial to 1865" designed by H.D. Repole at the National Heroes Park in Kingston, Jamaica.

== Reception ==
In 2012, Skylarking was placed at number 16 on the "Top 50 Reggae Albums" list, which was compiled by Jamaican disc jockey Clinton Lindsay and his colleague Marlon Burrell in commemoration of Jamaica's 50th anniversary as an independent nation. In 2014, Mojo placed it at number 43 on its list of the "50 Greatest Reggae Albums". In 2016, GQ named it as one of the "10 Classic LPs from Reggae's Golden Era".

== Track listing ==
No.	Title	Length
1.	"Where Do the Children Play"	2:52
2.	"Just Say Who"	2:28
3.	"Love of a Woman"	3:23
4.	"Skylarking"	3:09
5.	"Mammie Blue"	4:24
6.	"Please Don't Go"	2:46
7.	"Every Tongue Shall Tell"	2:28
8.	"Something's on My Mind"	2:20
9.	"See a Man's Face"	2:30
10.	"Don't Cry"	2:56
11.	"I'll Be Gone"	2:27
12.	"Got to Be Sure"	2:18

Reissue edition bonus tracks
No.	Title	Length
13.	"Oh Youth Man"	2:53
14.	"Night Owl"	4:03

== Personnel ==
- Horace Andy - vocals
- Sound Dimension - backing musicians
- Clement S. Dodd - producer, recording, mixing
- Sylvan Morris - mixing
