= Skylarking (Horace Andy song) =

Single by Horace Andy

from the album Skylarking
- B-side: "Skylarking Version"
- Released: 1971
- Genre: Reggae
- Length: 2:49
- Label: Bongo Man
- Songwriter(s): H. Hinds (Horace Andy)
- Producer(s): Coxsone Dodd

"Skylarking" is a single by Jamaican singer and songwriter Horace Andy, produced by Studio One founder Coxsone Dodd. The song, lyrically an admonishment of loitering youths who expect handouts, has been described as Andy's signature tune. It was first issued, rendered "Sky Larking", on Dodd's Jamaica Today - The Seventies compilation in 1971. The song became a popular sound system hit, prompting a release as a single on the Studio One subsidiary Bongo Man. It topped the Jamaican singles chart published in The Gleaner in August 1972. Andy cut the song again in 1974 for Bunny Lee, who licensed the recording to the UK-based Venture Records. A 1992 cover by Garnett Silk revived the song's popularity in Jamaica. Andy sings excerpts from "Skylarking", as well as his later song "Money Money" (1980), on Massive Attack's "Five Man Army" (1991).
