= Havana Meets Kingston =

Cuban/Jamaican musical collaboration

- Origin: Havana, Cuba
- Genres: Reggae, Dancehall, Salsa, Dub
- Years active: 2017-present
- Labels: ABC Music, VP Records, Baco Records
- Website: Official webpage

Havana Meets Kingston is a collaboration between the musicians of Cuba and Jamaica.

In 2015 Australian producer Mista Savona (born Jake Dominic Savona) flew a group of Jamaican musicians into Cuba to record a full-length album bringing together the musicians and artists of both islands. The resulting album Havana Meets Kingston was released in 2017. Recorded at EGREM Studios in Centro Habana, Cuba, the album was described by Readings as “a one-of-a-kind musical project…Jake is pioneering a new frontier of cross-cultural musical exchange.” Musicians featured on the album include Jamaican rhythm section Sly and Robbie, guitarist Ernest Ranglin and original members of Buena Vista Social Club, Los Van Van and Irakere. International tours followed including a live performance at the Royal Albert Hall in London for the BBC Proms, televised in full on BBC TV & Radio, and described by The Times as "Nothing Short Of Explosive”.

Havana Meets Kingston was released in November 2017 by ABC Music, VP Records, Baco Records and Cumbancha and Havana Meets Kingston Part 2 was released in October 2021.

2022 sees the release of Havana Meets Kingston in Dub produced by Gaudi, blending Jamaican dub with Afro-Cuban music, featuring artists from the original Havana Meets Kingston project.

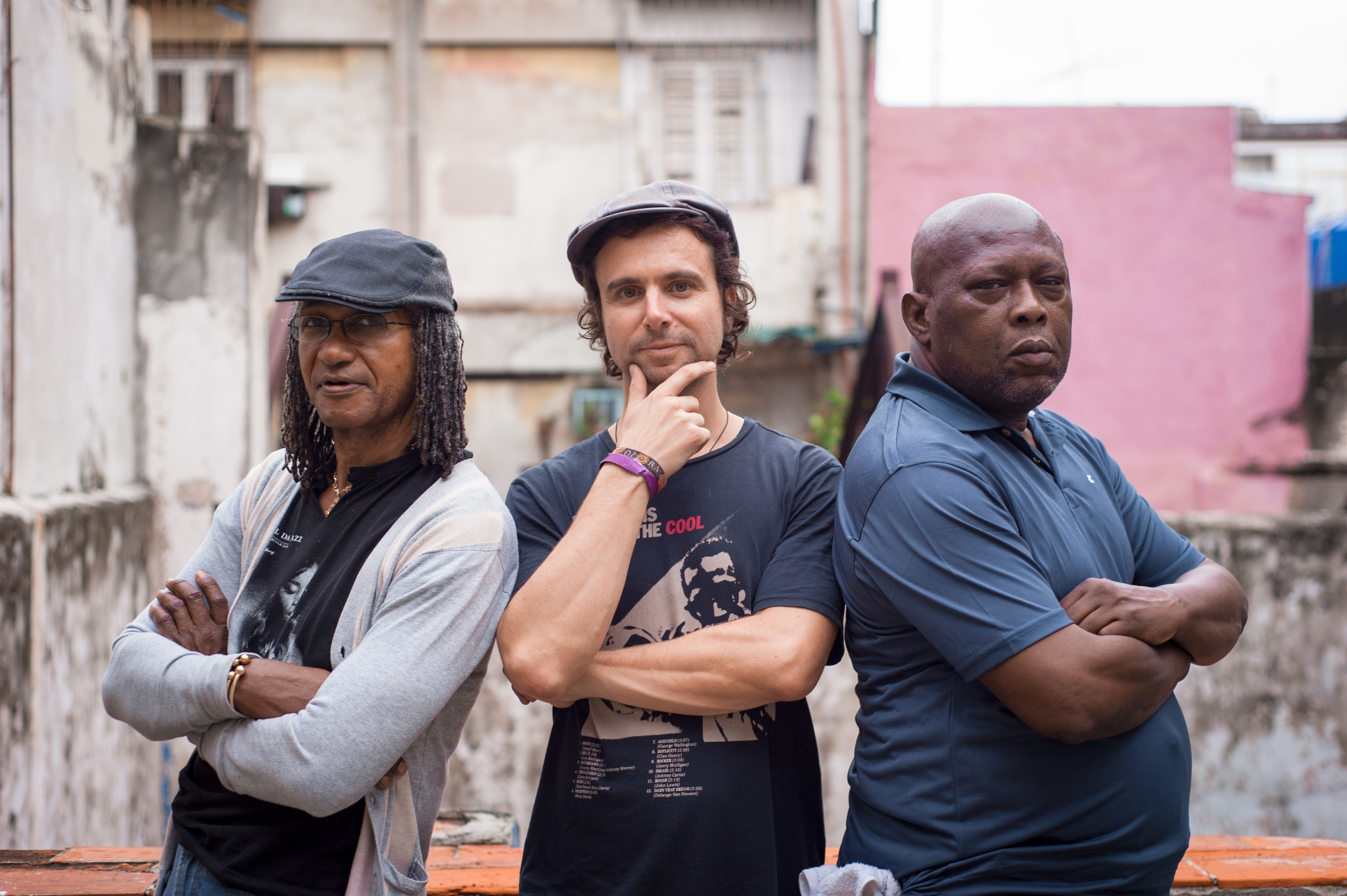
A photo of Sly Dunbar, Jake Savona and Robbie Shakespeare in Cuba in 2015

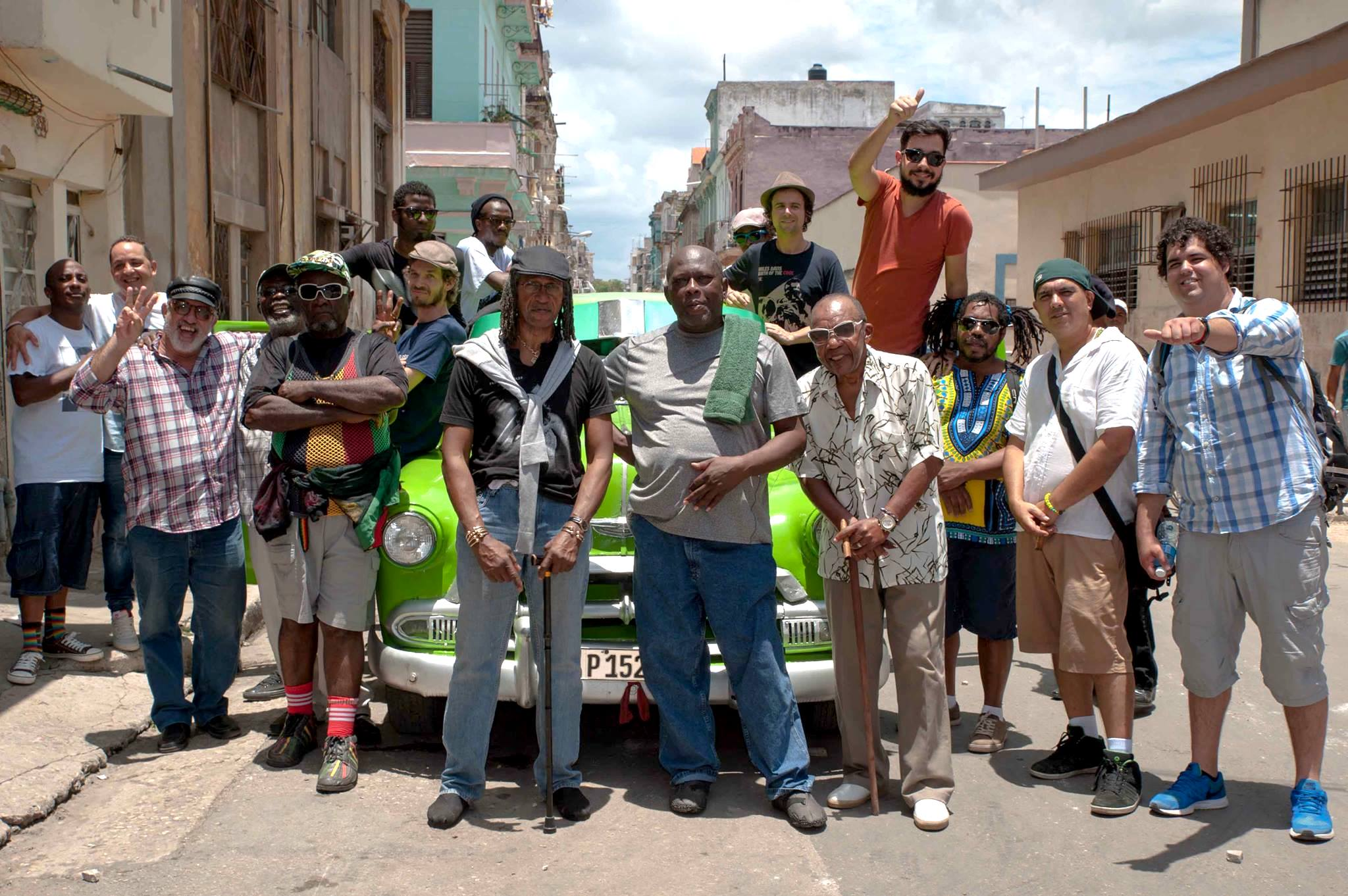
The Havana Meets Kingston band in Havana, Cuba in 2015

== Tracklisting ==
- Havana Meets Kingston - ABC Music, VP Records, Baco Records (2017)
