= Wackie's =

Record label

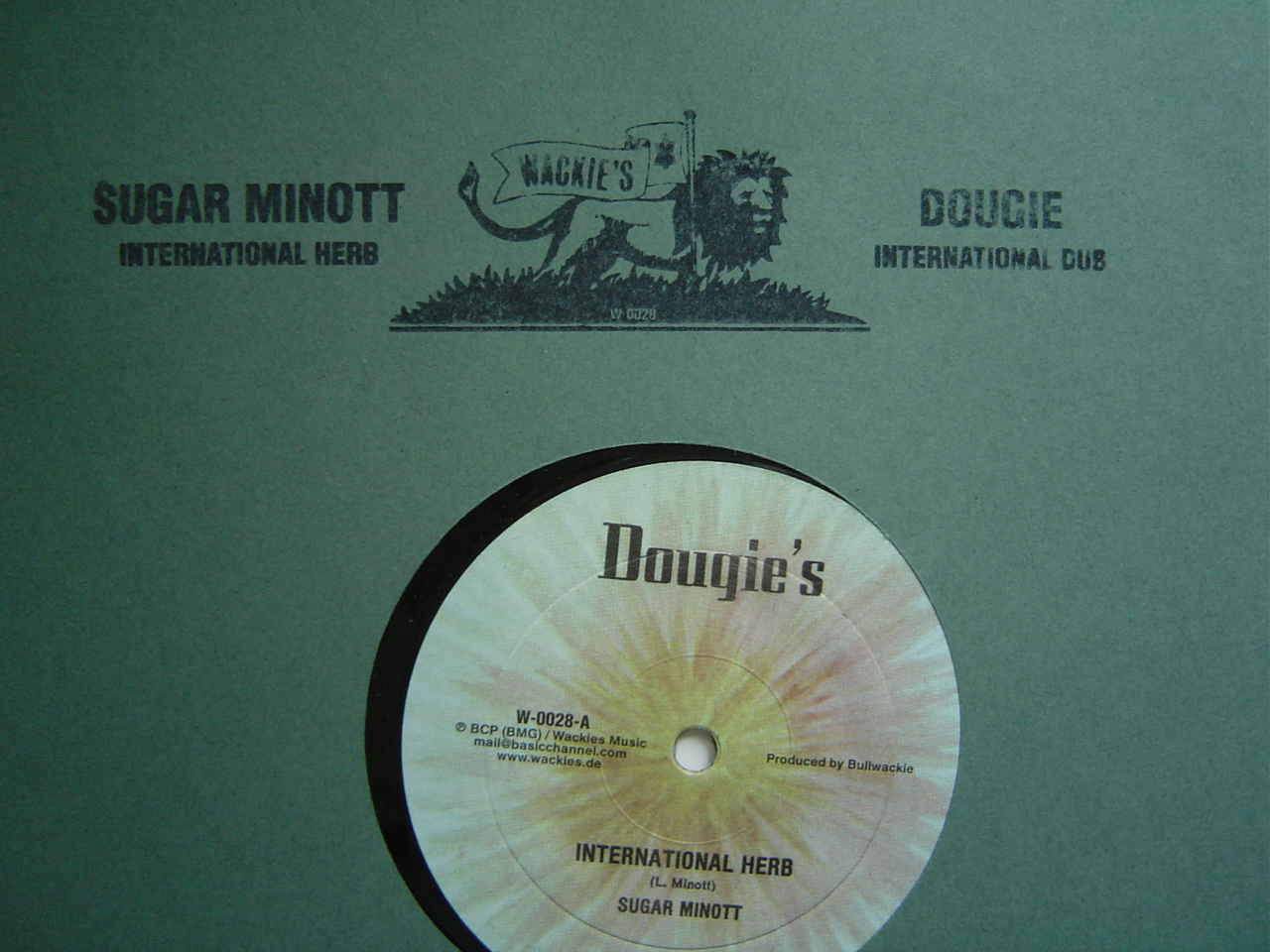

Wackies is an American independent record label specialized in reggae and dub music. Lloyd Barnes founded the label in 1976, and it is possibly the longest-running American recording studio for reggae.

== History ==
Wackie's is run by Lloyd "Bullwackie" Barnes, who was born in Trench Town, Jamaica, and moved to New York in 1967. He worked construction and bought the equipment for the studio at the nearby Sam Ash store. He started his studio at 4731 White Plains Road in The Bronx, as one of the earliest reggae studios in the country, with a record store named Wackie's House of Music nextdoor. Low on money, he had to be technically resourceful; his recording techniques added to the distinct quality of the sound.

Barnes recorded upcoming and lesser-known artists, with a backing band called Wackie's Rhythm Force. One artists who released all his work on Wackies was Noel Delahaye, a roots reggae singer who released three albums. In 1979, Barnes recorded Solid C., Bobby D. and Kool Drop's "Wack Rap", an early hip-hop single. By that time, Barnes was recording established artists, including Johnny Osbourne, Wayne Jarrett, and Leroy Sibbles (after he left the Heptones). The label also released songs by Horace Andy, including an album titled Dance Hall Style, and others that are now considered classics. Jamaican musician Milton Henry moved to New York in 1976 and worked for Wackie's, and recorded his first album there, Who Do You Think I Am (1985).

In the 1980s the White Plains Road building was sold, and Wackie's moved to Englewood, New Jersey, and around 1998 (when Barnes returned from a lengthy period in Jamaica) moved back, to Boston Road in the Bronx.

=== Wackie's sound ===
Wackie's record releases have a distinctive lo-fi sound.

== Re-issue and legacy ==
Most if not all of the original (1970s and 1980s) Wackies recorded releases are out-of-print and in demand among reggae music collectors. Germans Moritz Von Oswald and Mark Ernestus, passionate devotees of the label's sound, have undertaken an extensive and ongoing 12" and LP re-issue campaign for the label through an exclusive imprint in the Basic Channel record label family, bearing the Wackies logo and label design. To date, the imprint has put out work from artists such as Horace Andy, Jerry Harris, Wayne Jarrett, Love Joys, The Meditations, and Sugar Minott, as well as several strictly dub releases by Wackies-sponsored bands.

Christopher Coy directed a documentary on Wackie's in 1986, Bullwackie. In 2013, Supreme skategear released a series of Wackie's-inspired t-shirts and other items.

== See also ==
- List of record labels
