= Serious Times (Horace Andy album) =

Studio album by Horace Andy
- Released: 21 June 2010
- Studio: Mixing Lab Studio, Kingston, Jamaica; Anchor Recording Studio, Kingston, Jamaica; Big Yard Studio, Jamaica; Tuff Gong Recording Studio, Kingston, Jamaica; Country Side Studios; Brotherman's Hill, Gran Canaria
- Genre: Reggae
- Length: 61:01
- Label: Studio One
- Producer: Horace Andy; Andreas Christophersen

Horace Andy chronology
| Two Phazed People (2009) | Serious Times (2010) |

Serious Times is an album by the roots reggae artist Horace Andy, released on 21 June 2010. The album features a band made up of veteran reggae musicians including drummer Leroy "Horsemouth" Wallace, keyboard player Lloyd "Obeah" Denton and saxophonist Dean Fraser. It was produced by German reggae producer Andreas "Brotherman" Christophersen.

== Reception ==
Professional ratings
Review scores
| Source | Rating |
|---|---|
| AllMusic | 3.5/5 stars |

Rick Anderson of AllMusic gave the album 3.5 out of 5 stars, noting its "rootsy-yet-modern reggae rhythms", but also saying that not every track on this album was a highlight, also commenting on how vibrato vocals are starting sound like a "self-parody".

== Track listing ==
All lyrics by Horace Hinds; all music composed by Andreas "Brotherman" Christophersen

Serious Times track listing
| No. | Title | Length |
|---|---|---|
| 1. | "Serious Times" | 4:17 |
| 2. | "Crazy" | 4:59 |
| 3. | "So Real" | 4:27 |
| 4. | "False Witness" | 4:43 |
| 5. | "Cool It Down" | 4:00 |
| 6. | "Your Friend" | 4:00 |
| 7. | "Rastafari" | 3:54 |
| 8. | "Trodding" | 3:55 |
| 9. | "Rumors of War" | 3:59 |
| 10. | "Life" | 4:22 |
| 11. | "Give It Up" | 3:55 |
| 12. | "Rasta Words" | 4:13 |
| 13. | "That Light" | 4:34 |
| 14. | "Love" | 4:00 |
| 15. | "Cool It" (dub remix of "Cool It Down") | 4:23 |

== Personnel ==
- Horace Andy – vocals
- Andreas "Brotherman" Christophersen – guitar (tracks 2–6, 8–10 and 12–15)
- Andrew "Bassie" Campbell (tracks 6 and 8), Daniel "Axeman" Thompson (tracks 1–5, 7, 9 and 10–15) – bass guitar
- Lloyd "Obeah" Denton – keyboards (tracks 1–15)
- Leroy "Horsemouth" Wallace – drums (tracks 1–15)
- Herman "Bongo" Herman (tracks 1, 10 and 12), Christopher "Sky Juice" Blake (tracks 2–4 and 15), Uziah "Sticky" Thompson (tracks 6 and 8) – percussion
- Dean Fraser – saxophone (tracks 1, 6, 7, 11, 12 and 14)
- Romero Gray (track 6), Ronald "Nambo" Robinson (tracks 1, 2, 7, 11, 12 and 14) – trombone
- Chronic Horns – sampled horns (track 9)
- Brady Shammar (track 8), Nina Karle (track 13), Pam Hall (tracks 1, 2, 5–7, 9, 12 and 14) – backing vocals
