= Celloman =

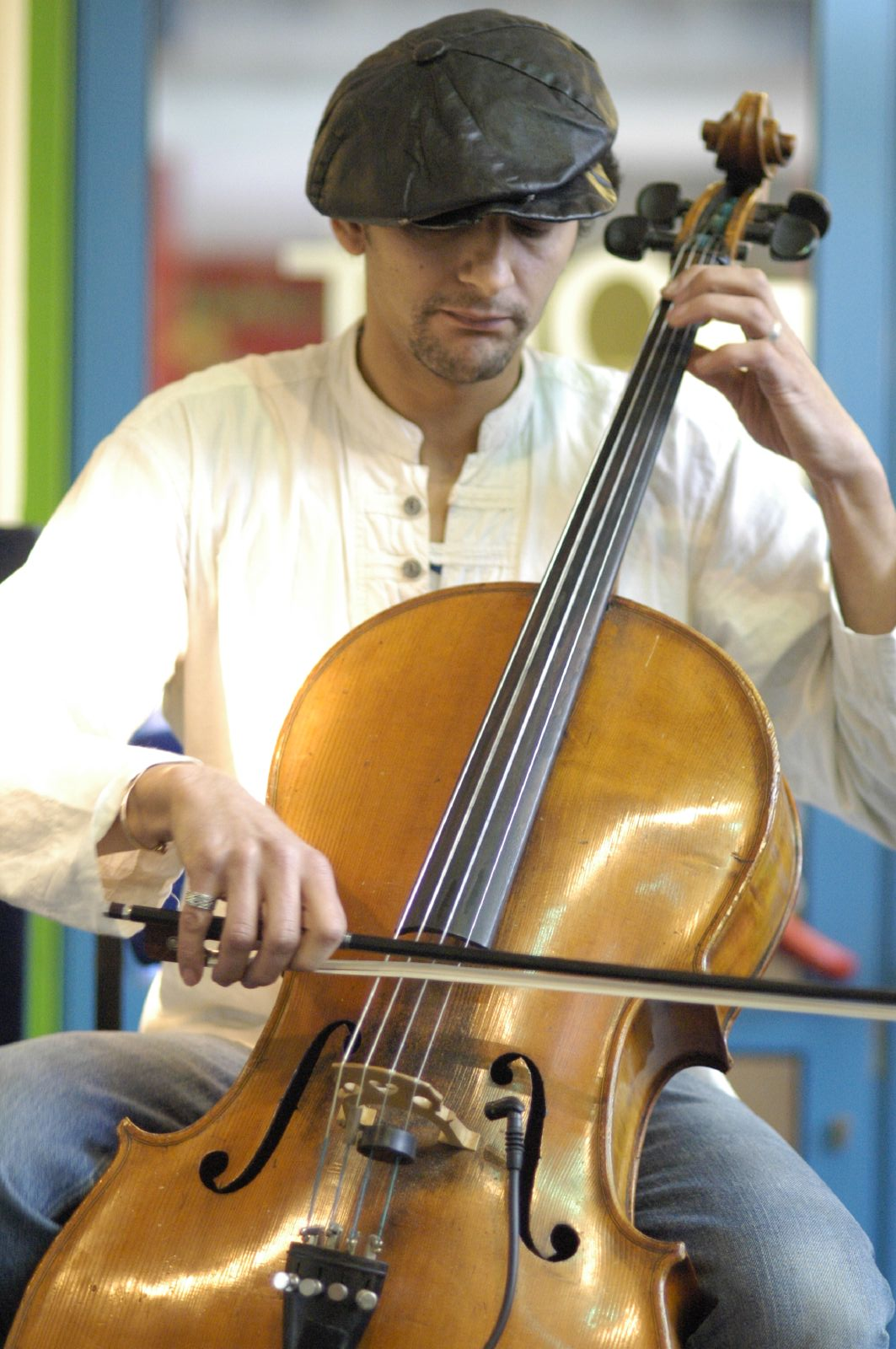
- Ivan Hussey

Background information
- Origin: London
- Genres: World, classical, Jazz
- Years active: 2001–present
- Label: Jambila
- Members: Ivan Hussey; Samy Bishai; Cosimo Keita; Oroh Angiama; Oli Savill
- Website: www.celloman.co.uk

Ivan Hussey, known professionally as Celloman, is a British cellist. His music combines world music, jazz, and classical with African and Middle Eastern rhythms.

== Musical career ==
Ivan Hussey's musical career began when he joined the Reggae Philharmonic Orchestra at the age of 17. Over the course of four years, Ivan appeared on two of their recorded albums and took part in tours of Japan, Jamaica and Europe. He became a session musician, playing cello on recordings by Take That, Jay Z, D'Influence, Soul II Soul, Incognito and Mick Jagger amongst others, and also toured with Duran Duran and Gabrielle in 1993 and 1994, respectively.

Over the years, Ivan has performed live and played on hundreds of records by artists such as Bebel Gilberto, Smoke City, The Lighthouse Family Leona Lewis, Keane, Annie Lennox, Gallows, The Spice Girls, Etti Ankri, David D'Or, Shaun Escoffery, Samantha Fox, Natacha Atlas.Mor Karbasi Adrian Sherwood, Coldcut, Lee Scratch Perry and others. In November 2019, Hussey joined Snow Patrol on their UK Reworked tour.

Celloman began in 2001 with the release of Aquador on Ivan Hussey's own independent record label Jambila Music (formerly SPI). Since then, Hussey has released a further six albums under the name Celloman, plus two albums under the name Ivan Hussey. As a band, Celloman have played numerous gigs both in the UK and Internationally, including four appearances at Glastonbury Festival, Exit Festival, Womad, Sauti za Busara, Glade Festival.

From 2012, Celloman began releasing albums with a more acoustic sound, including the albums: Acoustic Collection Vol.1, Acoustic Collection Vol.2, Arpezzato Cello and Cello, Moods & Broods In 2015, Hussey also released an EP under the name Hussey Marwood, containing cello and guitar duets recorded with guitarist Steve Marwood. In 2021 Hussey Marwood released a full album entitled: Drive.

In 2022, Celloman performed a 12-date UK tour to promote the release of Panacea, an album that returns to the sound of the first four albums.

== Arpezzato ==
In 2019, Celloman released an album entitled 'Apezzato Cello'. The word Arpezzato, coined by Hussey, relates to a style of cello playing that incorporates a variety of pizzicato-derived techniques imported from the world of Pop/Rock, Blues and Jazz including: ‘hammer-on’, ‘hammer-off’, ‘slide’, ‘pop’, ‘slap’, ‘strum’ and ‘Walking bass’. Hussey has spent a number of years exploring and developing this style of playing under the name 'Arpezzato', a combination of the words Arpeggio and Pizzicato. in both live performance and through workshops.

Hussey also runs a session recording business, Remote Strings.

== Members ==
Celloman's lineup for live performances over the years.

- Ivan Hussey - Cello, Vocals
- Cosimo Keita - Drums
- Oroh Angiama / Ross Hughes / Davide Mantovani / Andy Waterworth - Bass
- Oli Savill / Shanks / Jamie Fisher / Joelle Barker - Percussion
- Samy Bishai / Stephen Hussey - Violin
- Lol Ford - Guitar

Guest vocalists and instrumentalists commonly appear on Celloman's recordings; such as on the single, Streets Paved With Gold, which featured The Urban Soul Orchestra, as well as Shaun Escoffery on lead vocals.

== Discography ==
- Cello Moods & Broods (2023)
- Panacea (2022)
- A Journey (2021) - Best-of Compilation album
- Drive (2021) - under the name Hussey Marwood
- Arpezzato Cello (2019)
- Acoustic Collection Vol.2 (2018)
- Acoustic Collection Vol.1 (2015)
- Spanish Gold EP (2015) - under the name Hussey Marwood
- Music for Elastic Theatre (2013) - under the name Ivan Hussey
- Moods, Broods & Interludes (2012) - under the name Ivan Hussey
- Sharptown (2009)
- Streets Paved With Gold EP (2007)
- It's All An Illusion (2003)
- Maya (2002)
- Paparai EP (2002)
- Aquador (2001)
