= Lloyd Barnes =

Jamaican record producer (born 1944)

- Also known as: Bullwackie
- Born: 1944 (age 81–82); Jamaica
- Genres: Reggae
- Occupation: Producer

Lloyd Barnes (born 1944 in Jamaica), popularly known as Bullwackie, is a reggae music producer and the founder of the independent record label Wackie's, which specialized in Jamaican music.

== Career ==
Barnes was a protégé of Prince Buster, and recorded several singles during the 1960s. Lloyd Barnes worked for Duke Reid's Treasure Isle label as an engineer as well as recording a number of singles in Jamaica, amongst them "Righteous Man" by Little Roy, later emigrating to The Bronx, New York, in the 1970s. Here he founded the Wackie's House Of Music record store, and behind this shop-front was the first significant reggae studio and label in the United States. The Bullwackie's and Wackies labels followed, along with other imprints such as Senrab, Hamma, and Senta.

Barnes also recorded the group Aksumites, including recordings by Andrew McCalla and Joe Aksumite, two of the group members who have recorded with him since the inception of Wackie's House of Music, and during the late 1970s and early 1980s he produced artists such as Horace Andy, Sugar Minott, Junior Byles, Roland Alphonso, Tyrone Evans, and Lee "Scratch" Perry. Later productions included work by Jackie Mittoo. Barnes also operated a sound system, which he used as an outlet for the Wackies recordings.

Barnes presently resides in the Wakefield neighborhood in the New York City borough of the Bronx, where he owns and operates a music studio.
