= Horace Andy =

Jamaican singer (born 1951)

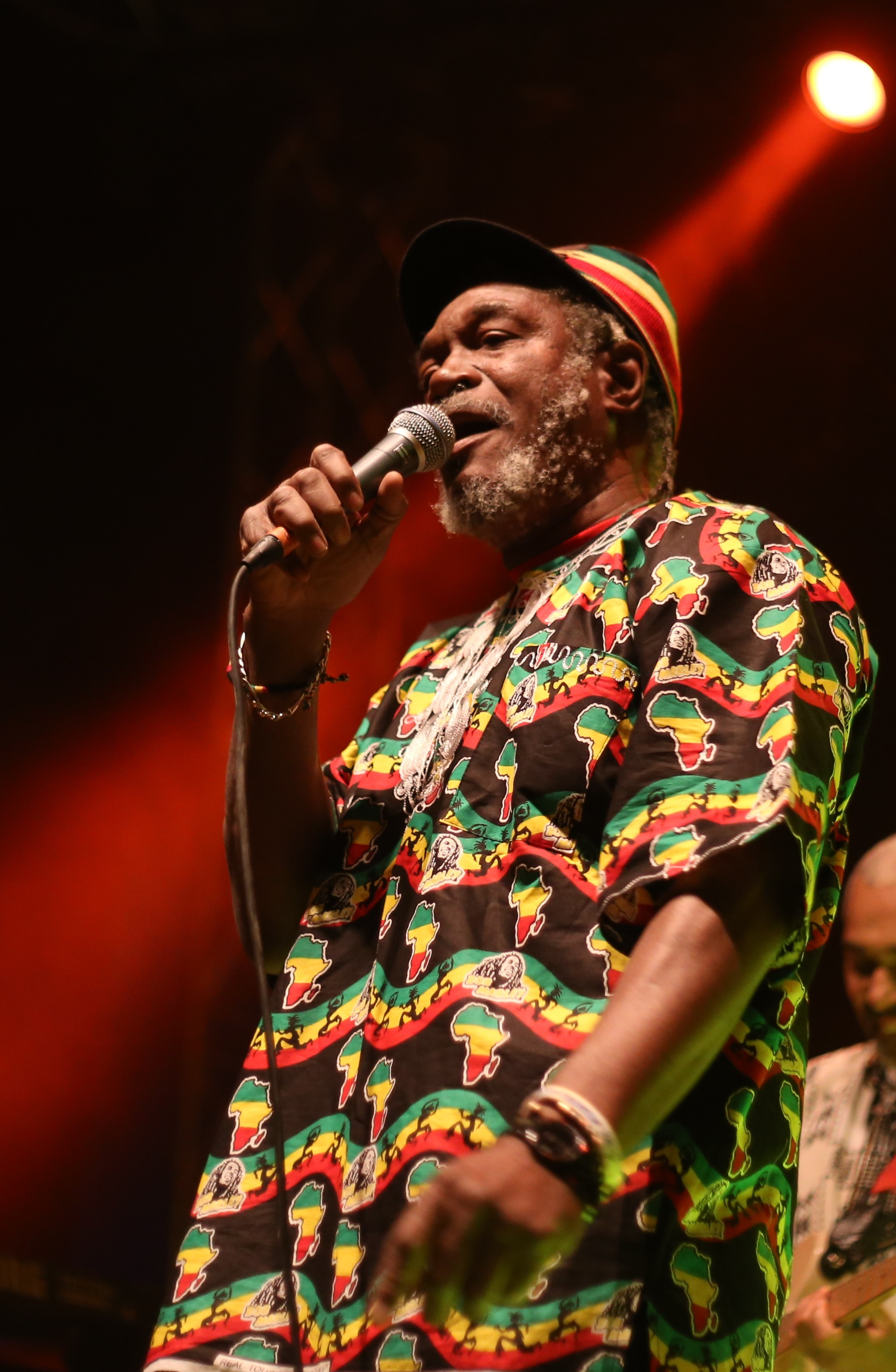
- Andy performing in 2013

Background information
- Also known as: Sleepy
- Born: Horace Keith Hinds; 19 February 1951 (age 75)
- Origin: Kingston, Jamaica
- Genres: Reggae; trip hop; electronica
- Instrument: Vocals
- Years active: 1967–present
- Labels: Cleopatra; Heartbeat; On-U Sound; RAS; Rough Trade; Shanachie; Studio One; Wackies

Horace Andy (born Horace Keith Hinds, 19 February 1951) is a Jamaican roots reggae songwriter and singer, known for his distinctive vocals and hit songs such as "Skylarking", as well as "Government Land", "Angel", "Spying Glass", and "Five Man Army" with English trip hop group Massive Attack. He is also famous for a cover version of "Ain't No Sunshine". Andy is often described as one of the most respected and influential singers in Jamaica.

== Biography ==
=== Early years ===
Born in Kingston, Jamaica, Hinds recorded his first single, "This is a Black Man's Country," in 1967 for producer Phil Pratt. "This is a Black Man's Country" failed to make an impact, and it would be 1970 before he achieved a breakthrough. After unsuccessfully auditioning at Coxsone Dodd's Studio One as a duo along with Frank Melody, he successfully auditioned on his own a few days later. Dodd decided Hinds should record as Horace Andy, partly to capitalise on the popularity of Bob Andy, and partly to avoid comparisons with his cousin, Justin Hinds, with whom his singing style at the time showed a resemblance. "Got To Be Sure", the song he had auditioned with, became his first release for Studio One. The following two years saw the release of further singles such as "See a Man's Face", "Night Owl", "Fever", and "Mr. Bassie". One of Andy's most enduring songs, "Skylarking", first appeared on Dodd's Jamaica Today compilation album, but after proving a sound system success, it was released as a single, going on to top the Jamaican chart.

Andy was a committed Rastafarian and attended meetings of the Ethiopian World Federation in Kingston. He later recalled that although Dodd was sympathetic toward Rastafari, he was initially cautious about recording protest-oriented material because there was little evidence of an audience for it. Andy wanted to record socially conscious material alongside his love songs, but recalled encountering resistance to the change, including criticism that his light vocal style was unsuited to protest songs.

The next few years saw Andy regularly in the reggae chart with further singles for Dodd such as "Something on My Mind", "Love of a Woman", "Just Say Who", and "Every Tongue Shall Tell", as well as singles for other producers such as "Lonely Woman" (for Derrick Harriott), "Girl I Love You" (Ernest and Joseph Hoo Kim), "Love You to Want Me" and "Delilah" (Gussie Clarke), and "Get Wise", "Feel Good", and "Money Money" for Phil Pratt. Andy had a second Jamaican number one single in 1973 with "Children of Israel".

Andy's most successful association with a producer, however, was with Bunny Lee in the middle part of the 1970s. This era produced a series of singles now regarded as classics such as a re-recorded "Skylarking", "Just Say Who", "Don't Try To Use Me", "You Are My Angel", "Zion Gate", "I've Got to Get Away", and a new version of "Something on My Mind".

In 1977, Andy moved to Hartford, Connecticut, with his first wife, Claudette, where he recorded for Everton DaSilva, including the In The Light album and its associated dub album, and singles such as "Do You Love My Music" and "Government Land". In 1979, Tapper Zukie released on his own Stars label, Horace Andy and Headley Bennett's discomix, "If I Wasn't a Man" tune, built around a variation on the horns refrain from Sound Dimension's Real Rock rhythm. In 1978, both Horace Andy and Freddie McKay recorded their own discomix versions of Wentworth Vernal's Studio One Coxsone Dodd hit tune, "The Rainbow”. Horace Andy's version was released on Tapper Zukie's Roots Rocker's label "Stars", Freddie McKay's version on the well-received Creation album. Andy also set up his own Rhythm label, which became an outlet for his work with DaSilva. The association with the producer was brought to an abrupt end when DaSilva was murdered in 1979.

Andy's 1978 album Pure Ranking had anticipated the rise of dancehall reggae, and he was a key figure in the early development of the genre, confirmed by 1982's groundbreaking, epoch making Dance Hall Style album, released on the Bullwackie's label, out of his studio in White Plains Road in The Bronx. Dance Hall Style, amongst other albums Wackie's released in that period, is now considered a classic. Andy continued to record with a variety of producers in the first half of the 1980s. In 1985, with his second wife Caroline, he relocated to Ladbroke Grove, London, and he recorded in the United Kingdom as well as regularly visiting Jamaica for further recording work.

=== Mainstream success with Massive Attack and after ===
1990 saw Andy's profile further raised when he began collaborating with Bristol trip hop pioneers Massive Attack, contributing to all five of their albums. He sang vocals on five tracks on their third album, Mezzanine, including on the song "Angel" (a new version of "You Are My Angel"). On their 2010 release Heligoland, Andy sang on the tracks "Splitting the Atom" and "Girl I Love You". In the mid-1990s, he also worked with Mad Professor, releasing the albums Life Is for Living and Roots and Branches. He then continued to record new music, with the album Living in the Flood, released in 1999 on Massive Attack's Melankolic record label, and Mek It Bun in 2002. He also featured on the world music project 1 Giant Leap and on the Easy Star All-Stars 2006 album Radiodread.

2022 saw the release of Andy's album Midnight Rocker, produced by Adrian Sherwood of On-U Sound. Andy's vocals were recorded in Jamaica, with the tracks sent back and forth between vocalist and producer until they were complete. The album received critical acclaim upon its release. In that year, he also released Midnight Scorchers. In 2024, he released a collaborative album with Jah Wobble, titled Timeless Roots.

== Personal life ==
Andy is a Rastafarian.

Some of his lyrics have been criticized for being homophobic. Andy confirmed that Trojan Records only agreed to release his album On Tour after removing a track containing the lyrics "The Father never make Adam and Steve, he make Adam and Eve".

== Discography ==
=== Albums ===
- Skylarking (Studio One, 1972)
- You Are My Angel (Trojan, 1973)
- Earth Must Be Hell (with Winston Jarrett; Atra, 1974) aka The Kingston Rock
- Earth Must Be Hell – Dub (with Winston Jarrett; Atra, 1974)
- In the Light (Hungry Town, 1977)
- In the Light Dub (Hungry Town, 1977)
- Pure Ranking (Clocktower, 1978)
- Bim Sherman Meets Horace Andy and U Black Inna Rub a Dub Style (with Bim Sherman and U Black; Yard International, 1980)
- Natty Dread a Weh She Want (New Star, 1980)
- Unity Showcase (with Errol Scorcher; Pre, 1981)
- Dance Hall Style (Wackies, 1982) aka Exclusively (Solid Groove, 1982)
- Showcase (Vista Sounds, 1984)
- Confusion (Music Hawk, 1984)
- Sings For You and I (Striker Lee, 1985)
- Clash of the Andy's (with Patrick Andy; Thunderbolt, 1985)
- Elementary (with Rhythm Queen; Rough Trade, 1985)
- Reggae Superstars Meet (with Dennis Brown; Striker Lee, 1986)
- From One Extreme to Another (with John Holt; Beta, 1986)
- Haul & Jack Up (Live & Love, 1987)
- Fresh (Island in the Sun, 1988)
- Shame and Scandal (1988)
- Everyday People (Wackies, 1988)
- Rude Boy (Shanachie, 1993)
- Jah Shaka Meets Horace Andy (Jah Shaka Music, 1994)
- Dub Salute 1 Featuring Horace Andy (Jah Shaka Music, 1994)
- Seek and You Will Find (Blackamix International, 1995)
- Seek and You Will Find – The Dub Pieces (Blackamix International, 1995)
- Life Is for Living (Ariwa, 1995)
- Roots and Branches (Ariwa, 1997)
- See and Blind (Heartbeat, 1998)
- Living in the Flood (Melankolic, 1999)
- Mek It Bun (Wrasse, 2002)
- From the Roots: Horace Andy Meets Mad Professor (RAS, 2004)
- This World (Attack, 2005)
- Livin' It Up (with Sly & Robbie; Medium, 2007)
- On Tour (Sanctuary, 2008)
- Two Phazed People (with Alpha; dontTouch, 2009)
- Serious Times (2010)
- Broken Beats (Echo Beach, 2013)
- Live It Up (Pioneer International, 2019)
- Midnight Rocker (On-U Sound, 2022)
- Midnight Scorchers (On-U Sound, 2022)
- Timeless Roots (with Jah Wobble; Cleopatra, 2024)

=== Contributing artist ===
- The Rough Guide to Dub (World Music Network, 2005)
